= Mets–Willets Point station (IRT Flushing Line) =

New York City Subway station in Queens

Mets–Willets Point
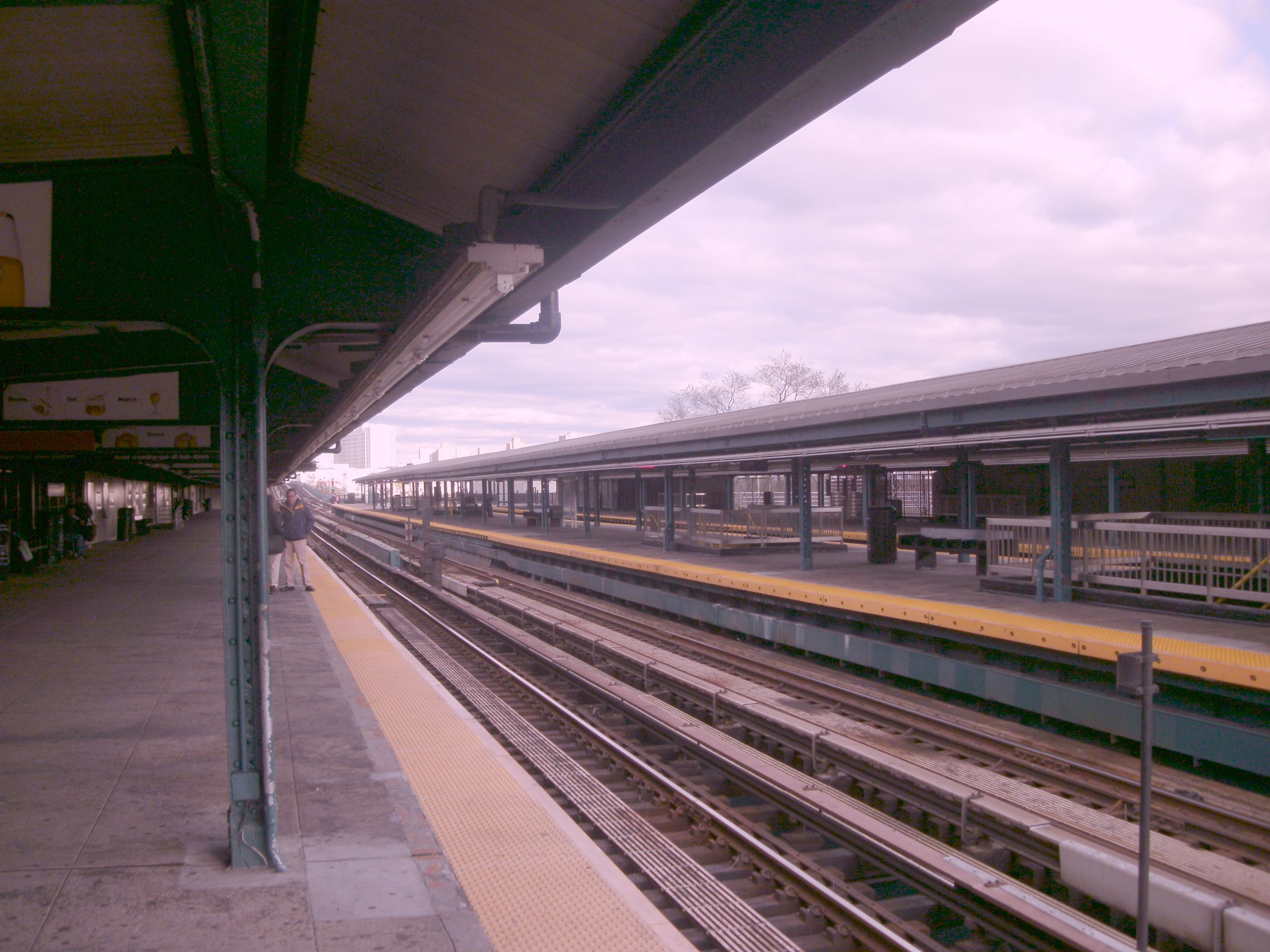
- Platforms of the Mets–Willets Point station

Station statistics
- Address: Seaver Way & Roosevelt Avenue; Queens, New York
- Borough: Queens
- Locale: Willets Point, Flushing Meadows–Corona Park
- Coordinates: 40°45′17″N 73°50′44″W
- Division: A (IRT)
- Line: IRT Flushing Line
- Services: 7 (all times) <7> (rush hours until 9:30 p.m., peak direction)
- Transit: NYCT Bus: Q90; LIRR: Port Washington Branch (at Mets–Willets Point)
- Structure: Elevated
- Platforms: 2 side platforms (local); 1 island platform (express & northbound local) cross-platform interchange (northbound only)
- Tracks: 3

Other information
- Opened: May 7, 1927; 99 years ago
- Rebuilt: April 24, 1939; 87 years ago
- Accessible: Partially (Northbound side (local) platform only; open only on game days and for special events)
- Former/other names: Willets Point Boulevard; World's Fair; Willets Point–Shea Stadium

Traffic
- 2025: 2,377,187 ▲24.7%
- Rank: 156 out of 423
Services
Preceding station	New York City Subway	Following station
Junction Boulevard <7> toward 34th Street–Hudson Yards	Express	Flushing–Main Street 7 <7> Terminus
111th Street 7 toward 34th Street–Hudson Yards	Local	Flushing–Main Street 7 <7> Terminus
Location
Location within New York City Subway
Location within New York City
Location within New York
Track layout
Street map
Station service legend
Symbol	Description
Stops all times	Stops all times
Stops rush hours in the peak direction only	Stops rush hours in the peak direction only

The Mets–Willets Point station is a rapid transit station on the IRT Flushing Line of the New York City Subway. Located near the Major League Baseball venue of Citi Field, it is served by the 7 train at all times and by the express <7> train during rush hours in the peak direction or after sporting events. This station is located near Flushing Meadows–Corona Park in Willets Point, Queens, on Roosevelt Avenue between 114th and 126th Streets.

The station opened on May 7, 1927, as a local station named Willets Point Boulevard, with two side platforms and three tracks. It was rebuilt into the current layout of three tracks, two side platforms, and a center island platform for the 1939 New York World's Fair. The overpass to Flushing Meadows–Corona Park was rebuilt in the early 1940s. Ahead of the 1964 New York World's Fair, the original wooden platforms were replaced with more durable concrete slabs. Shortly afterward, the station was renamed Willets Point–Shea Stadium for the nearby stadium. After Shea Stadium was replaced by Citi Field in 2009, the station was renamed after the New York Mets baseball team, and a ramp was added to the Flushing-bound side platform. A connection to the proposed AirTrain LaGuardia people mover system was announced in 2015, but the people mover was canceled in 2023.

The station's peak use occurs during Mets games at Citi Field (and, starting in 2027, New York City FC and Gotham FC soccer matches at Etihad Park), both located on the north side of the station, and during events at the USTA National Tennis Center, on the south side. The side platform for Manhattan-bound local trains, as well as the island platform for express trains and Flushing-bound local trains, are in regular use. The side platform for Flushing-bound local trains is wheelchair-accessible but is only open during sports games and special events; the other platforms are not wheelchair-accessible.

== History ==
=== Construction and opening ===
Attractions and geographical features of Flushing Meadows–Corona Park
Attractions and geographical features of Flushing Meadows–Corona Park:
1 Citi Field
2 Etihad Park (under construction)
3 Flushing Meadows Carousel and Queens Zoo
4 Flushing Meadows Corona Park Aquatics Center
5 Flushing River and Creek
6 Meadow Lake and Hong Kong Dragon Boat Festival
7 Metropolitan Park (planned) and Shea Stadium (demolished)
8 Mets–Willets Point subway station
9 Mets–Willets Point LIRR station
10 National Tennis Center and United States Pavilion (demolished)
11 New York Hall of Science
12 New York State Pavilion and Queens Theatre
13 Queens Botanical Garden
14 Queens Museum
15 Queens Night Market
16 Terrace on the Park
17 Unisphere
18 Willow Lake
19 World's Fair subway station (demolished)

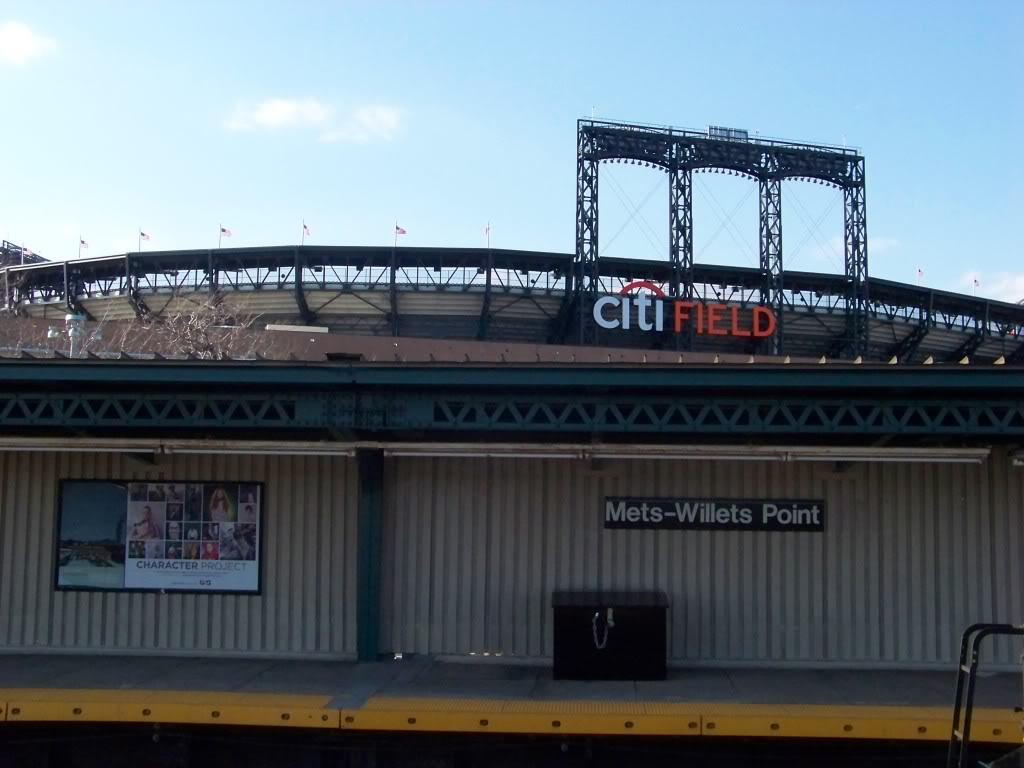
Citi Field and the Manhattan-bound local platform, as seen from the center island platform

The 1913 Dual Contracts called for the Interborough Rapid Transit Company (IRT) and Brooklyn Rapid Transit Company (BRT; later Brooklyn–Manhattan Transit Corporation, or BMT) to build new lines in Brooklyn, Queens, and the Bronx. Queens did not receive many new IRT and BRT lines compared to Brooklyn and the Bronx, since the city's Public Service Commission (PSC) wanted to alleviate subway crowding in the other two boroughs first before building in Queens, which was relatively undeveloped. The IRT Flushing Line was to be one of two Dual Contracts lines in the borough, along with the Astoria Line; it would connect Flushing and Long Island City, two of Queens's oldest settlements, to Manhattan via the Steinway Tunnel. When the majority of the line was built in the early 1910s, most of the route went through undeveloped land, and Roosevelt Avenue had not been constructed. Community leaders advocated for more Dual Contracts lines to be built in Queens to allow development there. The Flushing Line west of 103rd Street opened in 1917. The IRT agreed to operate the line under the condition that any loss of profits would be repaid by the city. In 1923, the BMT started operating shuttle services along the Flushing Line, which terminated at Queensboro Plaza.

As part of the Dual Contracts, the PSC would build the line eastward to at least Flushing. Three stations at Main Street, Willets Point Boulevard, and 111th Street were approved in 1921 as part of an extension of the Flushing Line past 103rd Street. Construction of the station and the double-deck bridge over the Flushing Creek began on April 21, 1923. The line to Main Street had been practically completed by 1925, but it had to be rebuilt in part due to the sinking of the foundations of the structure in the vicinity of Flushing Creek. Once the structure was deemed to be safe for operation, the line was extended to Willets Point Boulevard on May 7, 1927. The station's opening was formally celebrated on that date, coinciding with the opening of the Roosevelt Avenue Bridge for cars and buses. Until the Main Street station was completed, trains temporarily terminated at Willets Point Boulevard, where passengers boarded a shuttle bus to travel across the creek to Flushing. The Willets Point Boulevard extension was served by shuttle trains from 111th Street until through service was inaugurated on May 14.

The BMT used wooden elevated rolling stock, as the Flushing Line was built to IRT clearances, and standard steel BMT subway rolling stock were not compatible. Furthermore, because the Main Street station was underground, all elevated trains on the Flushing Line had to terminate at Willets Point Boulevard, as elevated trains were banned in subway tunnels. On January 22, 1928, the line was extended one stop east to Main Street. Afterward, Willets Point Boulevard was by far the least used station on the Flushing Line; it recorded 66,042 entries in 1930, whereas every other station on the line had at least one million passengers. After the Long Island Rail Road closed its Whitestone Branch to the neighborhood of Whitestone in early 1932, there were proposals to connect the branch with the subway at the Willets Point Boulevard station, but this did not happen.

=== 20th-century modifications ===
==== 1939 World's Fair ====
The site just south of the Willets Point Boulevard station was remodeled into Flushing Meadows–Corona Park in advance of the 1939 New York World's Fair. In December 1936, the IRT announced plans to expand the Willets Point Boulevard station to accommodate additional crowds for the World's Fair. The station would contain three platforms and four tracks, capable of serving 40 trains per hour in each direction. Expansion of the Willets Point Boulevard station, as well as the construction of an Independent Subway System (IND) line to a planned World's Fair station nearby, was seen as essential for World's Fair access. In January 1937, the World's Fair Corporation presented plans for the Willets Point Boulevard station's expansion to the New York City Board of Estimate, which voted to provide $650,000 for the project. The Manhattan Railway Company, which operated the IRT's elevated lines, opposed the planned expansion because it would put the IRT and IND in direct competition, but a federal judge ruled that the project could proceed.

Work on an overpass between the Willets Point Boulevard station and Flushing Meadows Park commenced in late 1937. Ramps and stairs were built from each platform to the overpass, where 16 turnstiles and a canopy were installed. Construction on the station itself began in January 1938, at which point the project had a budget of $494,000. The station had been revised to three tracks and three platforms. The center track and platform would be served by express trains that terminated at Willets Point Boulevard, while the outer two tracks would be used by local trains to Main Street. The IRT installed signals on the express track, which had previously been used as a storage track, and it built a power substation to allow for more frequent service. The IRT bought 50 World's Fair Lo-V subway cars in conjunction with these upgrades. World's Fair Special express trains began service on April 24, 1939. The fair opened on April 30, and 110,689 people entered the station on that day alone.

==== 1940s and 1950s ====
The city government took over the IRT's operations on June 12, 1940. After the World's Fair closed in October 1940, the Willets Point Boulevard station continued to operate, serving Flushing Meadows Park. The overpass to Flushing Meadows Park was reconstructed in 1941. As part of a pilot program aimed at reducing traffic congestion in midtown Manhattan, a park and ride facility with 3,000 parking spots opened next to the Willets Point Boulevard station in November 1947. Many of the Willets Point Boulevard station's riders came from the park-and-ride facility and from United Nations General Assembly meetings in Flushing Meadows Park, but the New York Daily News said in 1949 that the station "serves practically no resident population".

The IRT routes were given numbered designations in 1948 with the introduction of "R-type" rolling stock, which contained rollsigns with numbered designations for each service. The route from Times Square to Flushing became known as the 7. On October 17, 1949, the joint BMT/IRT operation of the Flushing Line ended, and the line became the responsibility of the IRT. After the end of BMT/IRT dual service, the New York City Board of Transportation announced that the Flushing Line platforms would be lengthened to 11 IRT car lengths; the platforms were only able to fit nine 51-foot-long IRT cars beforehand. The platforms at the station were extended in 1955–1956 to accommodate 11-car trains. However, nine-car trains continued to run on the 7 route until 1962, when they were extended to ten cars.

At the end of 1949, the city proposed diverting several bus routes that terminated in Flushing, sending these routes to Willets Point Boulevard. The bus-terminal plan faced great opposition. Critics objected that business near the bus terminals in Flushing would decrease and that travel times from Willets Point Boulevard to points east would increase. Supporters of the plan noted the heavy traffic congestion on Flushing streets and the narrowness of the stairways at the Main Street station. Super-express 7 trains started serving the station in 1953, running nonstop between Queensboro Plaza and Willets Point Boulevard during rush hours in the peak direction. The super-express service was discontinued in 1956.

==== 1964 World's Fair and Shea Stadium ====
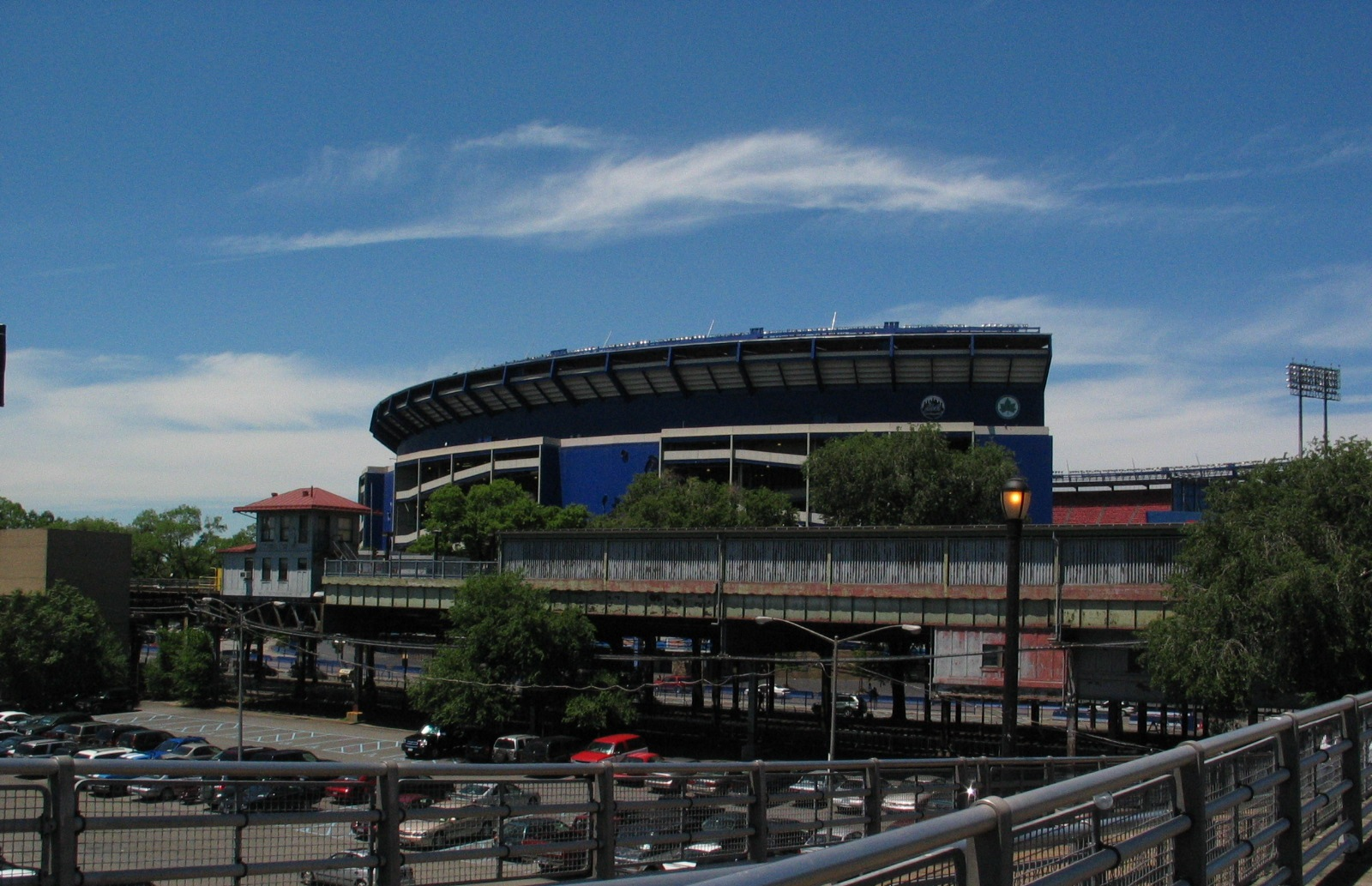
View with Shea Stadium in the background, prior to the stadium's demolition in 2009

In 1960, the New York City Transit Authority (NYCTA) proposed upgrading the station in advance of the 1964 New York World's Fair, which was to be held at Flushing Meadows. The plans included rebuilding the walkway between the station and the park; the Willets Point Boulevard station would be the closest stop to the fair, since the World's Fair Line was not planned to be rebuilt. The NYCTA set aside $3.2 million for the expansion of the Willets Point Boulevard station and the nearby Corona Yard. Around the same time, Shea Stadium was built north of the Willets Point Boulevard station as a baseball stadium for the New York Mets. To make way for Shea Stadium, the Willets Point Boulevard park-and-ride facility was closed in 1962 and replaced with a 1,200-space parking lot south of the station. A direct ramp was built from the station to Flushing Meadows Park to accommodate increased crowds. The wooden platforms were also replaced with more durable concrete slabs.

With the opening of the World's Fair in April 1964, trains were lengthened to eleven cars, and the NYCTA bought 430 R33 and R36 "World's Fair" cars to provide this enhanced service. The station was renamed Willets Point–Shea Stadium. The "Willets Point" in the station's name is derived from the boulevard. The boulevard was named after the Willets Point peninsula at Fort Totten, three miles (4.8 km) northeast. The area near the Willets Point Boulevard station became known as Willets Point during the 20th century.

One of Shea Stadium's parking lots, adjacent to the station, was expanded in 1978, becoming a park-and-ride facility with 1,500 spaces. In 1983, the developer Donald Trump proposed erecting a football stadium within Flushing Meadows–Corona Park; the city government would have renovated the Willets Point subway station in conjunction with Trump's stadium. However, the stadium was never built. A floor mosaic at the station's entrance, depicting the old Trylon and Perisphere, was completed in 1998.

=== 21st century ===
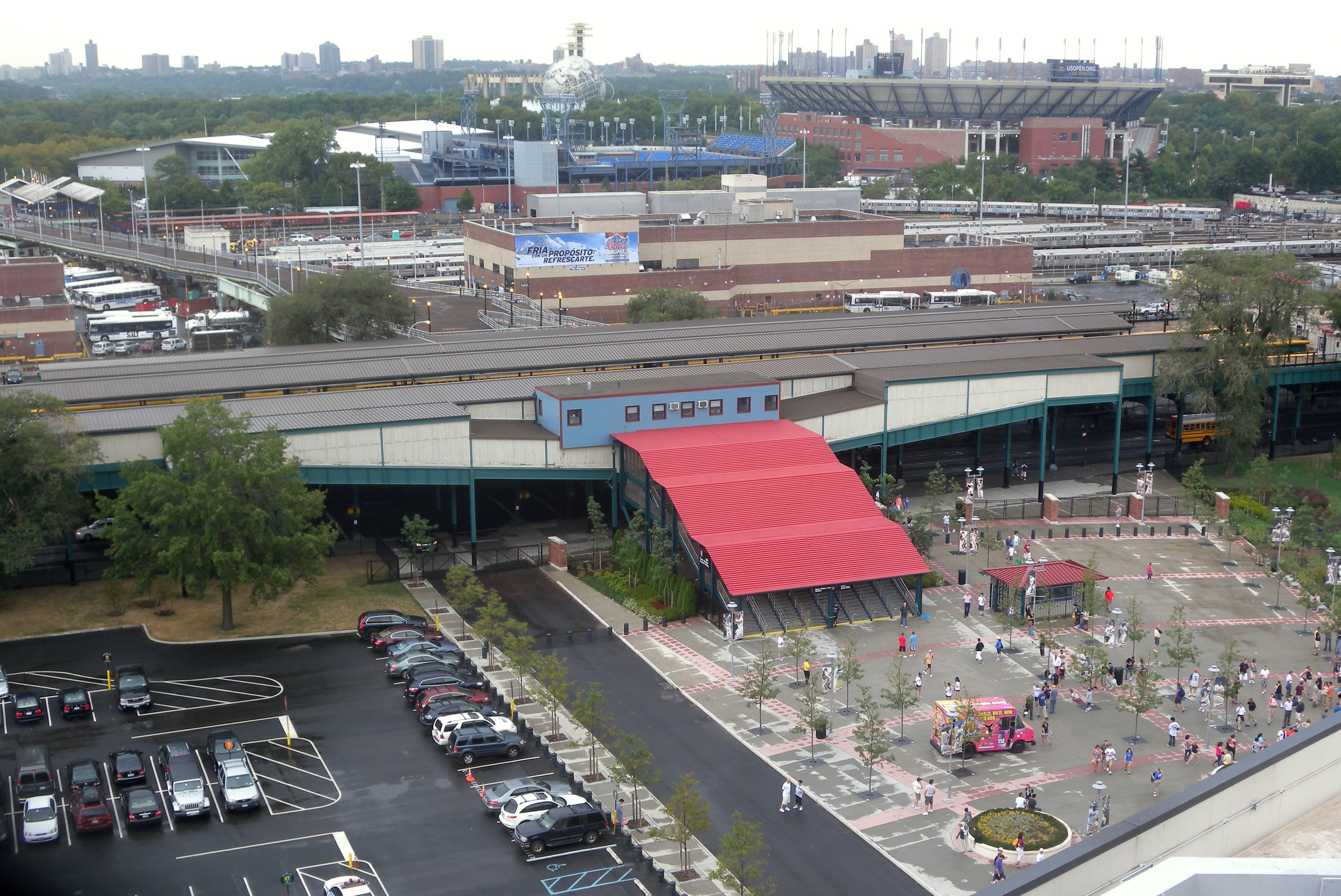
The entrance/exit stairs for Mets-Willets Point station viewed from Citi Field. The Long Island Rail Road station is at rear left and the USTA National Tennis Center is at rear right.

The MTA reintroduced express service to Manhattan at the conclusion of New York Mets weeknight games in July 2007. Super-express trains to Manhattan also started operating after weekend games in April 2008. The super-express trains run for approximately one hour after the game and only make three stops in Queens before entering Manhattan: 61st Street–Woodside, Queensboro Plaza, and Court Square.

After Shea Stadium was replaced with Citi Field in 2009, the Metropolitan Transportation Authority renamed the stop Mets–Willets Point, omitting the corporate-sponsored name associated with the current stadium. Citigroup had sponsored the new baseball field but did not sign a naming rights deal with the MTA. Had the naming rights deal been achieved, the station would have been known as Willets Point–Citi Field. In conjunction with Citi Field's construction, the MTA also spent $40 million to renovate the subway and LIRR stations at Willets Point, including $18 million on the subway station. The MTA repainted the station, replaced lighting, and renovated the platforms. A ramp to the northbound side platform was rehabilitated, making that platform compliant with the Americans with Disabilities Act of 1990 (ADA). However, the other platforms remained inaccessible, prompting protests from disability rights advocates. Except for game days, the Mets–Willets Point station remained sparsely used, with 4,155 passengers on an average weekday in 2014.

==== Unbuilt AirTrain station ====
On January 20, 2015, New York Governor Andrew Cuomo announced a plan to build AirTrain LaGuardia, a people mover running along the Grand Central Parkway and connecting the station to LaGuardia Airport. The project would have included a $50 million renovation of the Willets Point subway station, which would have become fully accessible. In May 2017, Parsons Brinckerhoff was hired to design the AirTrain; at the time, construction was projected to start in 2019. Transportation advocates criticized the plan as being overly roundabout. In October 2021, Kathy Hochul, who succeeded Cuomo as governor after his resignation, directed PANYNJ to pause the AirTrain project. The PANYNJ presented 14 alternatives in March 2022, and the AirTrain LGA project was canceled in March 2023 in favor of increased bus service.

==== Proposed redevelopment ====
As part of the proposed Metropolitan Park casino complex, the station would be renovated and redeveloped in order to help serve the area. The Metropolitan Park plan was approved in December 2025. The plans call for the installation of four elevators to give the entire station ADA accessibility, as well as the construction of several walkways connecting the station to the casino and several parking garages. The portion of the mezzanine connecting to the Passarelle Boardwalk would permanently become part of the mezzanine's unpaid area. In addition, existing non-accessible ramps would be rebuilt. Plans also called for a New York Mets logo in a plaza outside one of the entrances.

== Station layout ==
The Mets–Willets Point station contains three tracks and three platforms. From compass north to south, there is a southbound side platform, southbound track for Manhattan-bound local trains (internally known as track 1), center express track (track M), island platform, northbound track for Flushing-bound local trains (track 2), and northbound side platform. It is served by 7 local trains at all times and by <7> express trains during rush hours in the peak direction. The next station to the west is Junction Boulevard for express trains and 111th Street for local trains, while the next station to the east is Flushing–Main Street. Northbound local trains normally open their doors on the island platform. The northbound side platform is used only during Mets games and events at the National Tennis Center, such as the U.S. Open. Some 7 local trains terminate at this station during the evening rush hour.

West of the station, there are switches between the local tracks, the express track, and the northern layup track to 111th Street. East of the station, switches allow trains on the express track in either direction to switch to the local track, but not vice versa.

=== Exits ===
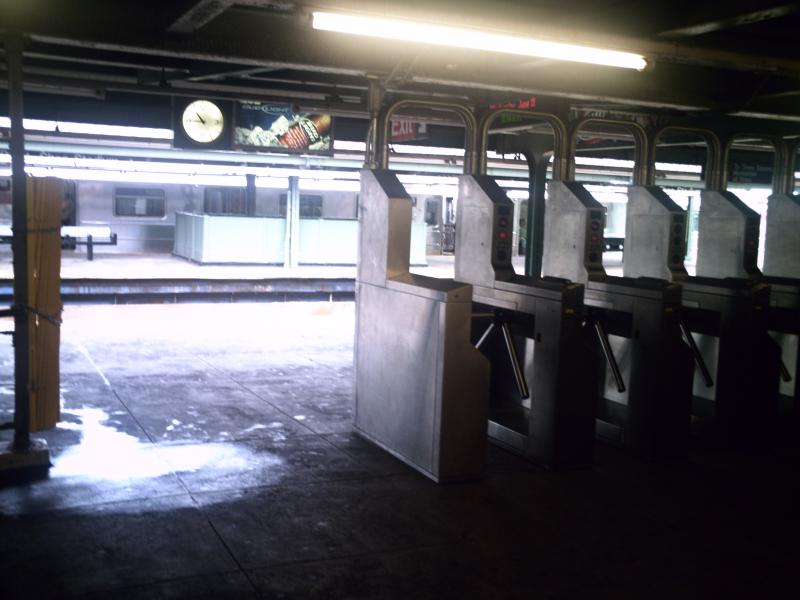
Turnstiles on the Manhattan-bound platform that are used during events

On the south side of the station, a wheelchair-accessible ramp connects the mezzanine and the northbound (southern) side platform to a footbridge, known as the Passarelle Boardwalk, which passes over Corona Yard and connects to the Mets–Willets Point station on the Long Island Rail Road (LIRR)'s Port Washington Branch, before entering the grounds of the National Tennis Center.

A wooden mezzanine is located underneath the tracks and platforms, with two ramps to the southbound platform and two stairways to the island platform. The north side of the station has a stairway, which formerly led to Shea Stadium but now leads directly to Citi Field's Jackie Robinson Rotunda. The mezzanine contains a station agent's booth, as well as a main fare control area with several turnstiles and an emergency-exit door. Typically, passengers enter the station through the main fare control area, but these turnstiles are deactivated during Mets games, allowing pedestrians to walk between the LIRR station to the south and Citi Field to the north without paying a fare. During Mets games, the ramps to the southbound platform and the stairs to the island platform are accessed by their own fare-control areas, each with several turnstiles.

=== Accessibility ===
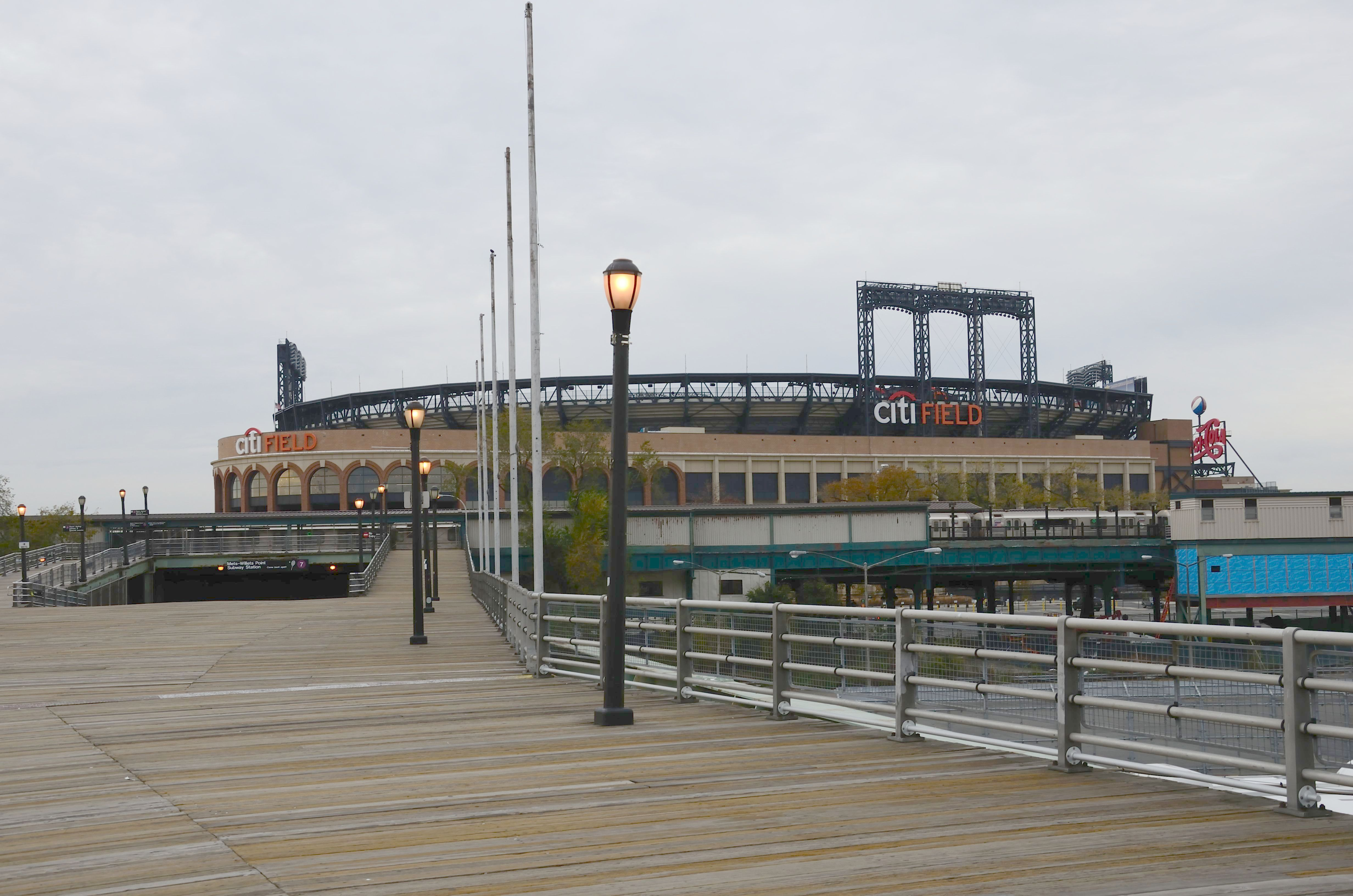
Ramp to station from LIRR with Citi Field in the background

The Mets–Willets Point station is generally not accessible to passengers with disabilities, except during sporting events, when the northbound side platform is open. In 2009, the MTA built a ramp from the south side of Roosevelt Avenue to the station mezzanine. The two existing ramps from the mezzanine to station level were modified to make them ADA-accessible; the work cost $4 million. The ramps are owned and maintained by the New York City Department of Parks and Recreation.

Some riders with disabilities were unhappy that the station was not made completely accessible during the station's renovation. By contrast, other New York City Subway stations that serve sports venues, including 161st Street–Yankee Stadium for Yankee Stadium, 34th Street–Penn Station at Seventh Avenue and Eighth Avenue for Madison Square Garden, and Atlantic Avenue–Barclays Center for Barclays Center, are completely accessible. Northbound local trains open their doors on the side platform during games and special events only; the platform typically opens 90 minutes before an event and closes 90 minutes afterward. The southbound platform and the center platform are not wheelchair-accessible. (Note: The station is not marked as a wheelchair-accessible station on the New York City Subway map, even in the northbound direction. The MTA also does not list the station as being wheelchair-accessible on its website.) Transit advocates also complained about the Willets Point station's lack of accessibility outside of game days; aside from Willets Point, only four of the Flushing Line's 18 stations in Queens were accessible. As of 2024, the MTA also had not allocated funding for further accessibility upgrades in its 2025–2029 capital plan. The Metropolitan Park plan calls for accessibility upgrades such as elevators.

A footbridge had formerly extended north over Casey Stengel Plaza, leading to a long, circular staircase with turnstiles at the bottom, bringing people close to Gate E at Shea Stadium. In 2008, the footbridge and turnstiles were removed and replaced with a wider stairway which is now situated at Mets Plaza, close to Citi Field's Jackie Robinson Rotunda. The arrangement of turnstiles in the mezzanine was also reconfigured to improve the post-game pedestrian flows and allow fans to use all ramps, whether they were using the subway or walking across the Passarelle Boardwalk to reach the Long Island Rail Road station or parking lots in Flushing Meadows–Corona Park.
