= 111th Street station (IRT Flushing Line) =

New York City Subway station in Queens

111 Street
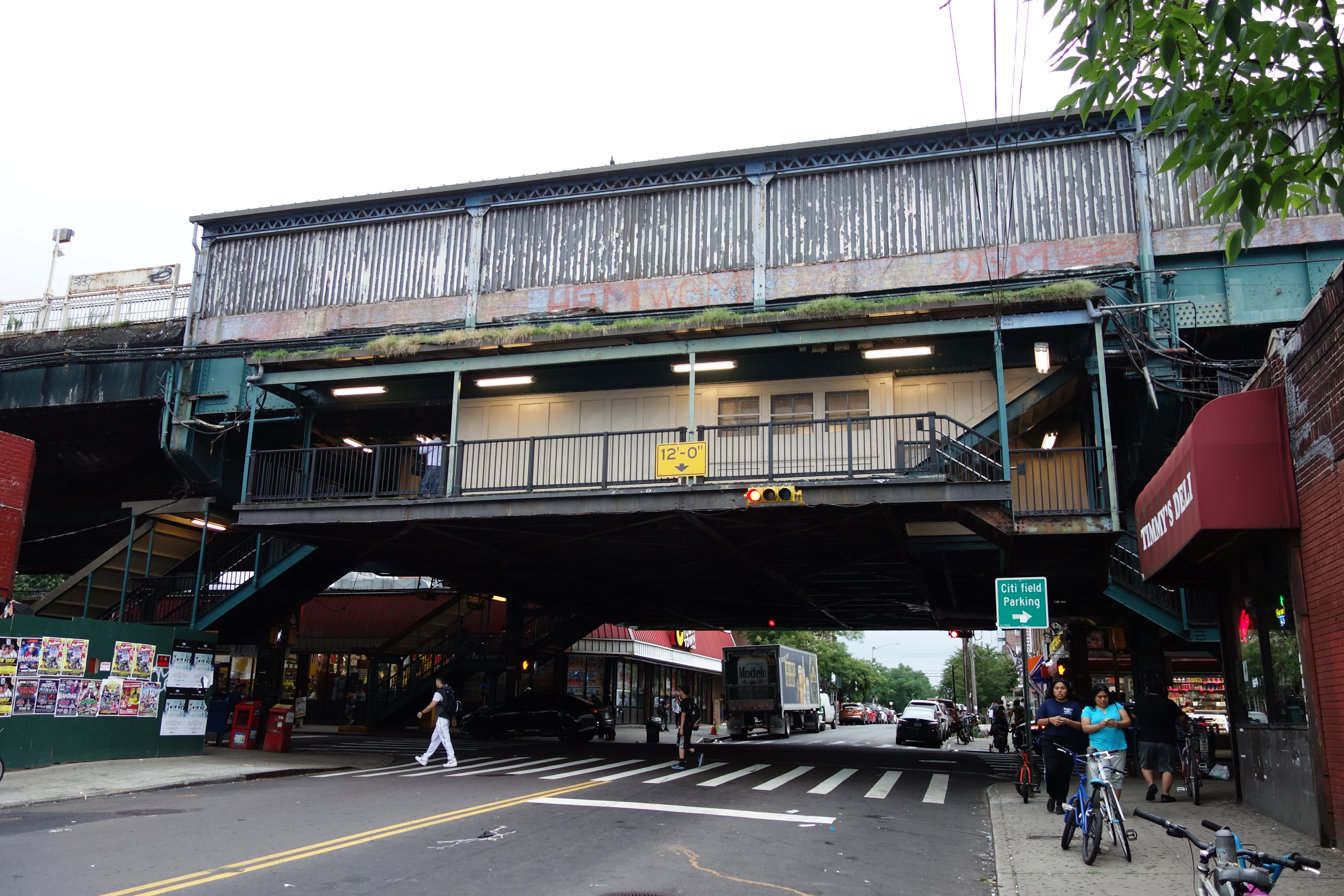
- Station house at 111th St

Station statistics
- Address: 111th Street & Roosevelt Avenue; Queens, New York
- Borough: Queens
- Locale: Corona
- Coordinates: 40°45′6.17″N 73°51′20.29″W
- Division: A (IRT)
- Line: IRT Flushing Line
- Services: 7 (all times)
- Transit: MTA Bus: Q23 (at 108th Street)
- Structure: Elevated
- Platforms: 2 side platforms
- Tracks: 5 (2 local in passenger service at platform level; 1 express track above)

Other information
- Opened: October 13, 1925; 101 years ago

Traffic
- 2025: 3,465,726 ▲63.3%
- Rank: 106 out of 423
Services
Preceding station	New York City Subway	Following station
103rd Street–Corona Plaza toward 34th Street–Hudson Yards	Local	Mets–Willets Point toward Flushing–Main Street
does not stop here
Location
Location within New York City Subway
Location within New York City
Location within New York
Track layout
Street map
Station service legend
Symbol	Description
Stops all times	Stops all times

The 111th Street station is a local station on the IRT Flushing Line of the New York City Subway, located at the intersection of 111th Street and Roosevelt Avenue. It is served by the 7 train at all times. The <7> train skips this station when it operates.

== History ==
=== Early history ===
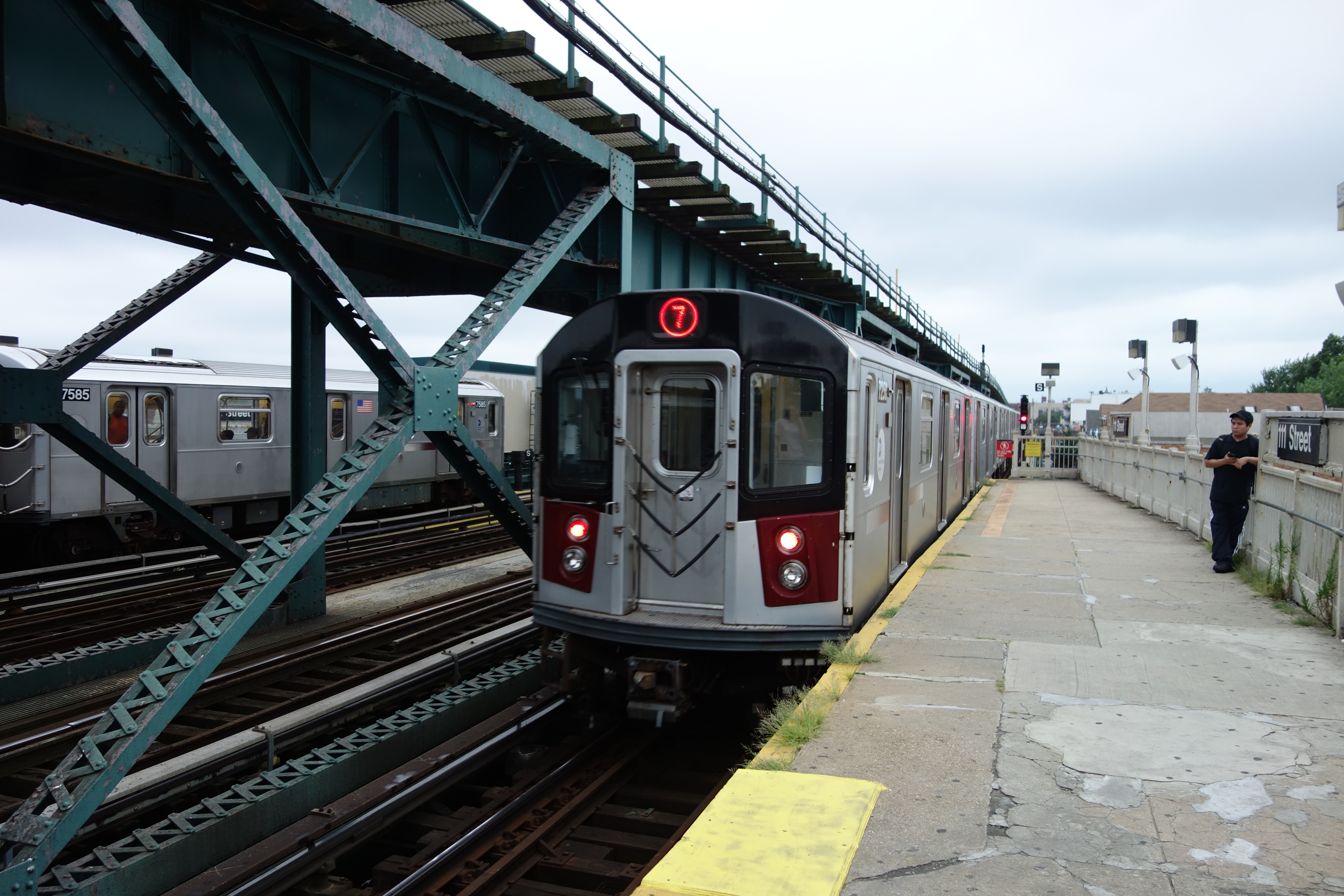
A Manhattan-bound local train leaving the station. The flying express track is visible above the station.

The 1913 Dual Contracts called for the Interborough Rapid Transit Company (IRT) and Brooklyn Rapid Transit Company (BRT; later Brooklyn–Manhattan Transit Corporation, or BMT) to build new lines in Brooklyn, Queens, and the Bronx. Queens did not receive many new IRT and BRT lines compared to Brooklyn and the Bronx, since the city's Public Service Commission (PSC) wanted to alleviate subway crowding in the other two boroughs first before building in Queens, which was relatively undeveloped. The IRT Flushing Line was to be one of two Dual Contracts lines in the borough, along with the Astoria Line; it would connect Flushing and Long Island City, two of Queens's oldest settlements, to Manhattan via the Steinway Tunnel. When the majority of the line was built in the early 1910s, most of the route went through undeveloped land, and Roosevelt Avenue had not been constructed. Community leaders advocated for more Dual Contracts lines to be built in Queens to allow development there.

The station opened on October 13, 1925, with shuttle service between 111th Street and the previous terminal at Alburtis Avenue (now 103rd Street–Corona Plaza). Shuttle service used the Manhattan-bound track. The line was extended to Willets Point Boulevard (now Mets–Willets Point) on May 7, 1927, and to the current terminal at Flushing–Main Street on January 21, 1928.

=== Later years ===
The city government took over the IRT's operations on June 12, 1940. The IRT routes were given numbered designations in 1948 with the introduction of "R-type" rolling stock, which contained rollsigns with numbered designations for each service. The route from Times Square to Flushing became known as the 7. On October 17, 1949, the joint BMT/IRT operation of the Flushing Line ended, and the line became the responsibility of the IRT. After the end of BMT/IRT dual service, the New York City Board of Transportation announced that the Flushing Line platforms would be lengthened to 11 IRT car lengths; the platforms were only able to fit nine 51-foot-long IRT cars beforehand. The platforms at the station were extended in 1955–1956 to accommodate 11-car trains. However, nine-car trains continued to run on the 7 route until 1962, when they were extended to ten cars. With the opening of the 1964 New York World's Fair, trains were lengthened to eleven cars.

As part of the 2015–2019 Capital Program, the MTA announced plans to renovate the 52nd, 61st, 69th, 82nd, 103rd and 111th Streets stations, a project that had been delayed for several years. Conditions at these stations were reported to be among the worst of all stations in the subway system. The Manhattan-bound platform at the 111th Street station was closed for renovation on May 15, 2023, and reopened on April 19, 2024. The Flushing-bound platform at this station was closed for renovation on May 6, 2024, and reopened on January 27, 2025.

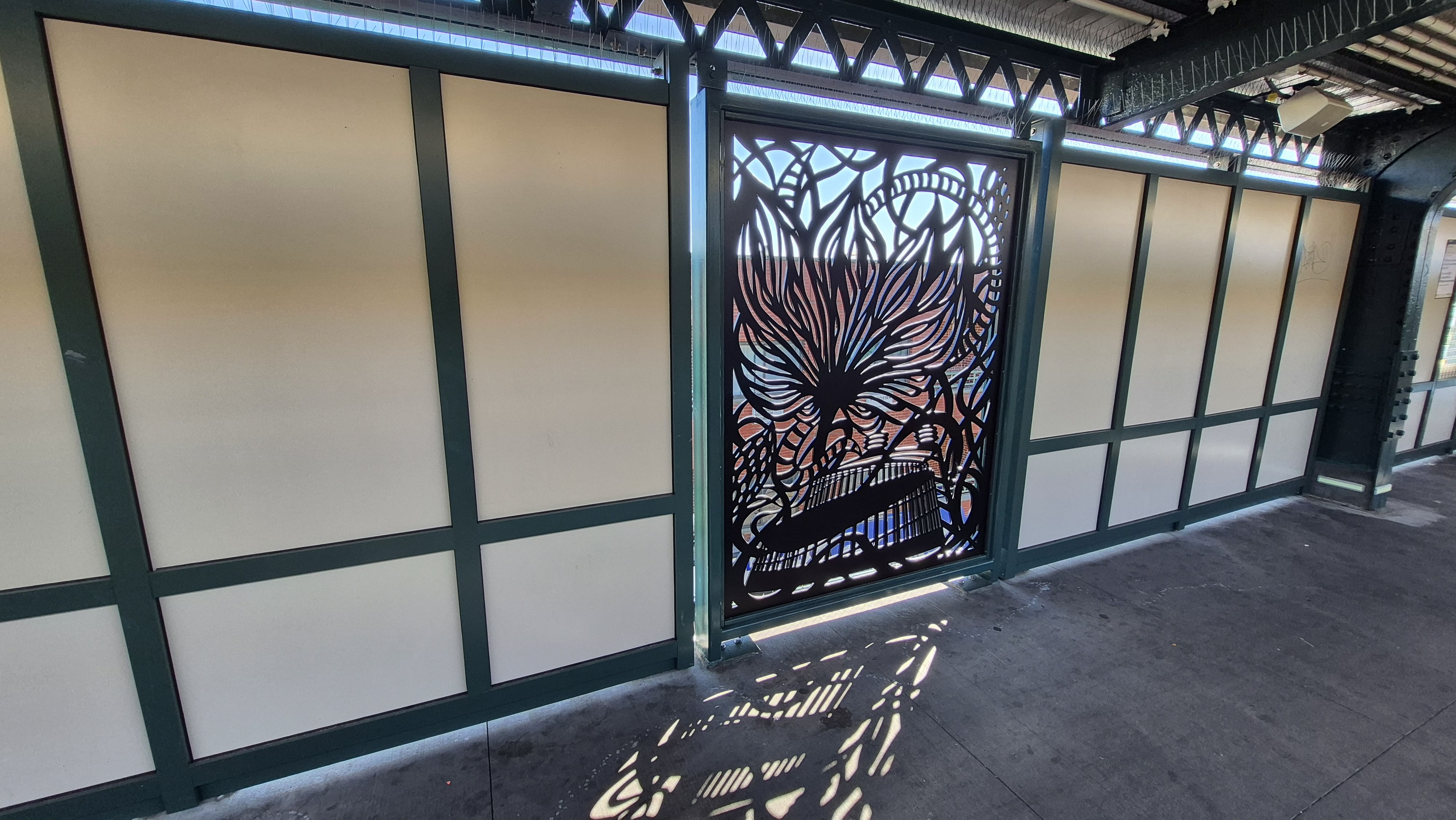
Artwork installed in 2025 at 111 St on the 7 line

== Station layout ==
The station has five tracks and two side platforms. The express track is located on a flyover above the other four tracks. The two center tracks are not used in passenger service, but instead are used as yard leads of the Corona Yard, where 7 trains are maintained and stored. As a result, trains that go to/from the yard often terminate or begin at this station. Stations with flyover express tracks such as this were far more common on IRT elevated lines in Manhattan during the 19th and early 20th centuries. Due to the yard tracks, an unusual layout takes place in and east of the station. The two layup tracks only have connections to the main tracks east of the station. The eastbound track rises east of the station while the express track lowers. The layup tracks dive down and cross under the eastbound track. The westbound track then rises to level out the three tracks, which continue east.

This station has full windscreens except at the west end of the eastbound platform, which has a waist-high steel fence instead.

=== Exits ===
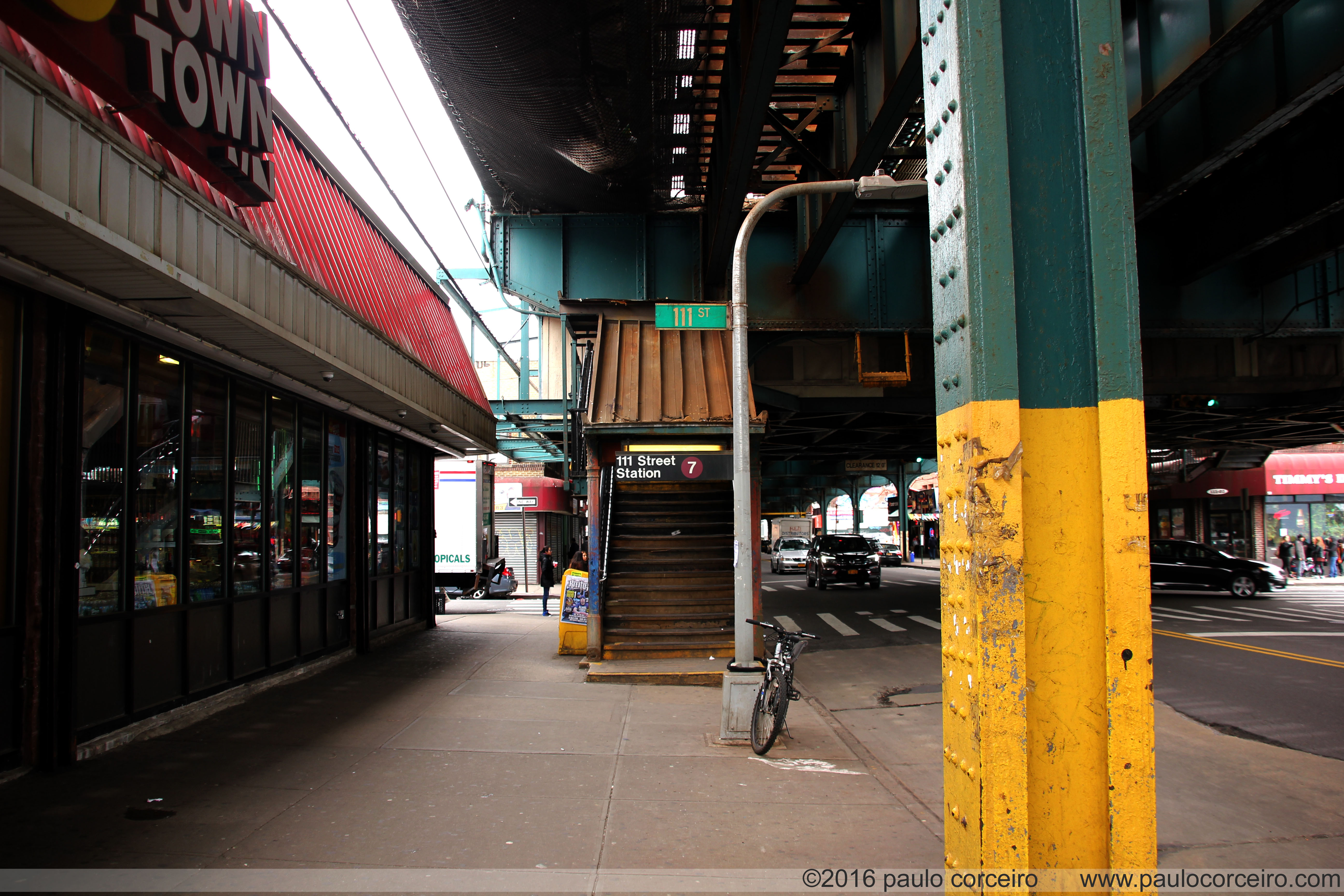
Station entrance on the northeast corner

Exit is at the south (geographic west) end, with staircases to all four corners of 111th Street and Roosevelt Avenue. The mezzanine and stairway landings are wooden while the flooring at the fare control area is concrete. The station has a crossunder between platforms. New signs have covered the old ones. Above some of the black station signs reading "111 Street" are white signs reading "Hall of Science", identifying the nearby New York Hall of Science five blocks south.
