= Flushing–Main Street station (IRT Flushing Line) =

New York City Subway station in Queens

Flushing–Main Street
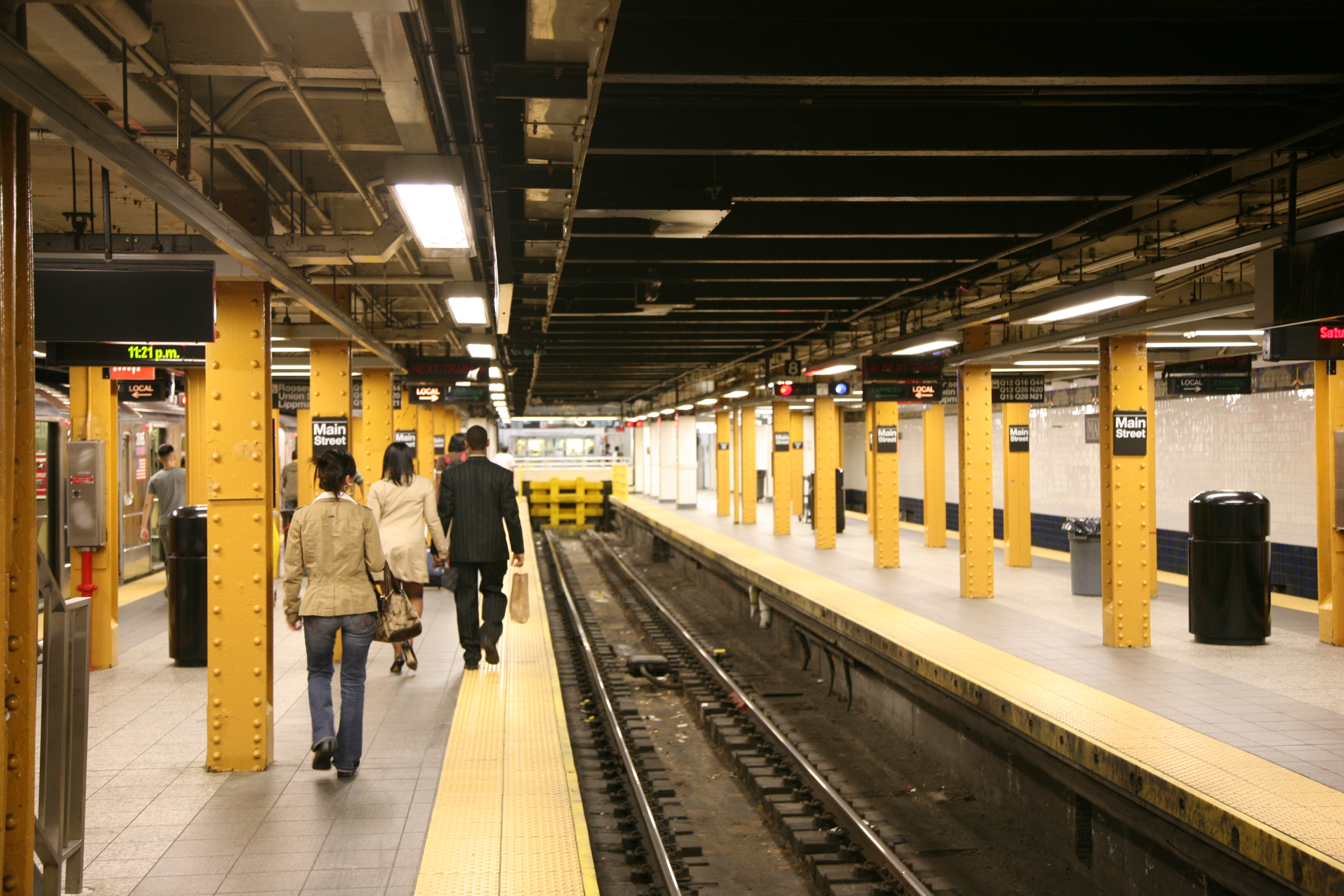
- View from Track M platform

Station statistics
- Address: Main Street and Roosevelt Avenue; Queens, New York
- Borough: Queens
- Locale: Flushing
- Coordinates: 40°45′34″N 73°49′49″W
- Division: A (IRT)
- Line: IRT Flushing Line
- Services: 7 (all times) <7> (rush hours until 9:30 p.m., peak direction)
- Transit: NYCT Bus: Q12, Q13, Q15, Q16, Q17, Q20, Q27, Q44 SBS, Q58, Q61, Q90, Q98; MTA Bus: Q19, Q25, Q26, Q28, Q50, Q63, Q65, Q66; NICE Bus: n20G, n20X; LIRR: Port Washington Branch (at Flushing–Main Street)
- Structure: Underground
- Platforms: 2 island platforms
- Tracks: 3

Other information
- Opened: January 21, 1928; 98 years ago
- Accessible: Yes

Traffic
- 2025: 14,807,359 ▲1.5%
- Rank: 9 out of 423
Services
Preceding station	New York City Subway	Following station
Mets–Willets Point 7 <7> toward 34th Street–Hudson Yards	7 (New York City Subway service)	Terminus
Location
Location within New York City Subway
Location within New York City
Location within New York
Track layout
Street map
Station service legend
Symbol	Description
Stops all times	Stops all times
Stops rush hours in the peak direction only	Stops rush hours in the peak direction only
- Main Street Subway Station (Dual System IRT)
- U.S. National Register of Historic Places
- MPS: New York City Subway System MPS
- NRHP reference No.: 04001147
- Added to NRHP: October 14, 2004

The Flushing–Main Street station (signed as Main Street on entrances and pillars, and Main St–Flushing on overhead signs) is the eastern (railroad north) terminal on the IRT Flushing Line of the New York City Subway, located at Main Street and Roosevelt Avenue in Downtown Flushing, Queens. It is served by the 7 local train at all times and the <7> express train during rush hours in the peak direction.

The Flushing–Main Street station was originally built as part of the Dual Contracts between the Interborough Rapid Transit Company (IRT) and the Brooklyn–Manhattan Transit Corporation (BMT). It opened on January 21, 1928, completing the segment of the Flushing Line in Queens. Although plans existed for the line to be extended east of the station, such an extension was never built. The station was renovated in the 1990s. The Metropolitan Transportation Authority (MTA) began constructing additional staircases, including four new entrances, at the station in 2022.

The station has two island platforms and three tracks; the platforms are connected at their eastern end. There are nine entrances at street level, leading to two separate fare control areas at Main Street and at Lippmann Plaza. There is an elevator, which makes the station compliant with the Americans with Disabilities Act of 1990. The station is listed on the National Register of Historic Places. In 2025, it was the busiest subway station in Queens and the 9th busiest subway station in the system.

== History ==
=== Planning and construction ===
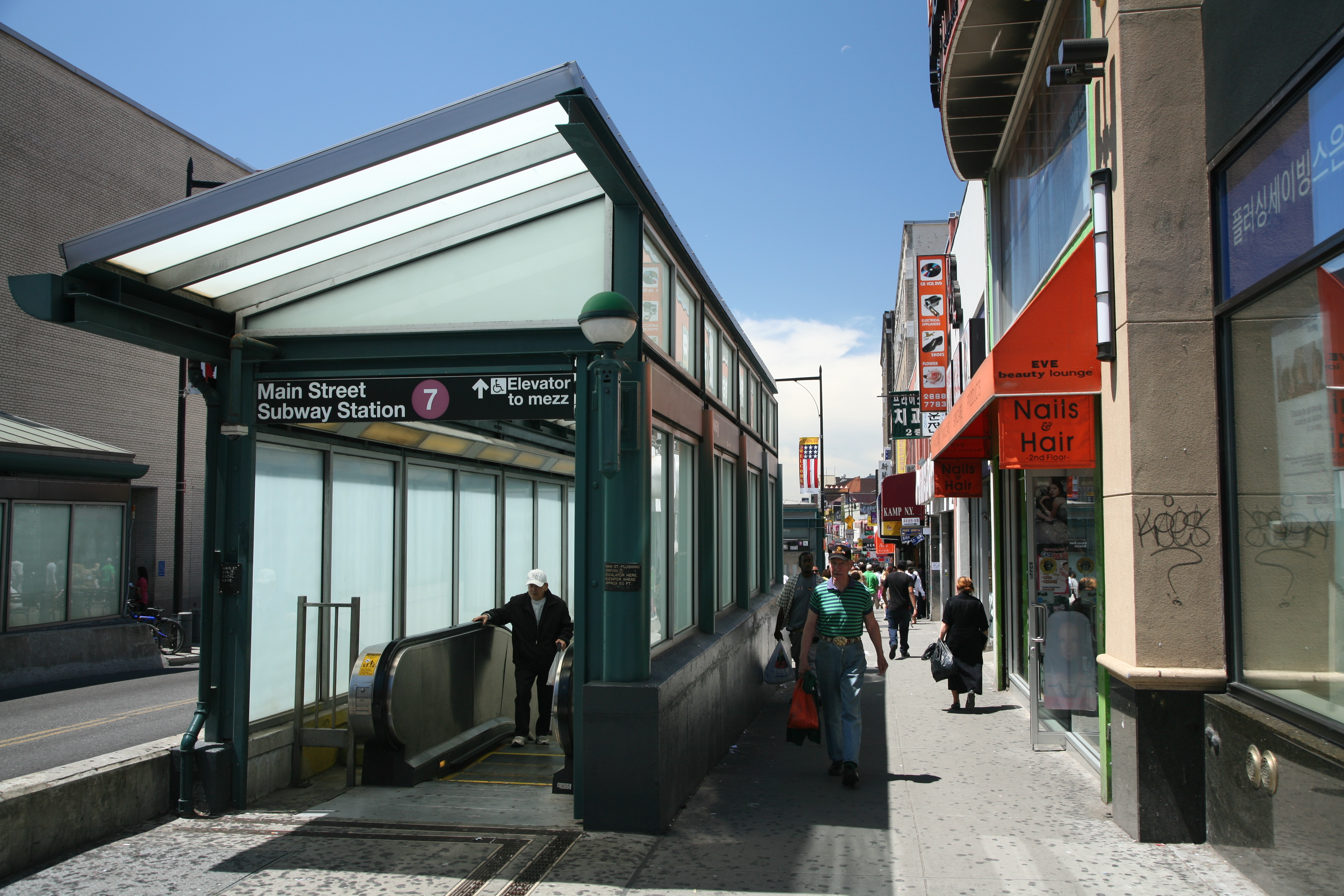
One of the escalators in the eastern entrance

The 1913 Dual Contracts called for the Interborough Rapid Transit Company (IRT) and Brooklyn Rapid Transit Company (BRT; later Brooklyn–Manhattan Transit Corporation, or BMT) to build new lines in Brooklyn, Queens, and the Bronx. Queens did not receive many new IRT and BRT lines compared to Brooklyn and the Bronx, since the city's Public Service Commission (PSC) wanted to alleviate subway crowding in the other two boroughs first before building in Queens, which was relatively undeveloped. The IRT Flushing Line was to be one of two Dual Contracts lines in the borough, and it would connect Flushing and Long Island City, two of Queens's oldest settlements, to Manhattan via the Steinway Tunnel. When the majority of line was built in the early 1910s, most of the route went through undeveloped land, and Roosevelt Avenue had not been constructed. Community leaders advocated for more Dual Contracts lines to be built in Queens to allow development there.

At the time of the line's planning, Downtown Flushing was a quiet Dutch-colonial-style village; what is now Roosevelt Avenue in the area was known as Amity Street, a major commercial thoroughfare in the neighborhood. In late 1912, Flushing community groups were petitioning the Public Service Commission (PSC) to depress the proposed line in Flushing into a subway tunnel, rather than an elevated line. Unlike a subway, an el would cause disturbances to the quality of life and a loss in nearby property values, as well as a widening of Amity Street that would cause more changes to the already existing town. One Amity Street property owner compared the planned effect of an elevated Flushing Line on Amity Street to the degradation of Myrtle Avenue in Brooklyn after the Myrtle Avenue Elevated was built there. On the other hand, a subway would only require that the street be widened, even though it was more expensive than an elevated of the same length.

On January 20, 1913, because of these concerns, the Flushing Association voted to demand that any IRT station in Flushing be built underground. Due to advocacy for elevated extensions to the line past Flushing (see § Proposed extension of the line), the PSC vacillated on whether to build a subway or elevated for the next few months. The PSC finally voted to bring the Flushing portion of the line underground in April 1913. However, as the costs of a subway had increased by then, they decided to postpone discussion of the matter. In June 1913, the New York City Board of Estimate voted to allow the line to be extended from 103rd Street–Corona Plaza east to Flushing as a three-track line, with a possible two-track second phase to Bayside.

The Flushing Line west of 103rd Street opened in 1917. The IRT agreed to operate the line under the condition that any loss of profits would be repaid by the city. As part of the agreement, the PSC would build the line eastward to at least Flushing. The station, as well as two other stations at Willets Point Boulevard and 111th Street, was approved in 1921 as part of an extension of the Flushing Line past 103rd Street. Construction of the station and the double-deck bridge over the Flushing Creek began on April 21, 1923, with the station built via cut-and-cover methods. The bridge was completed in 1927, and the station opened on January 21, 1928, over a decade after the line initially began operation.

=== Proposed extension of the line ===
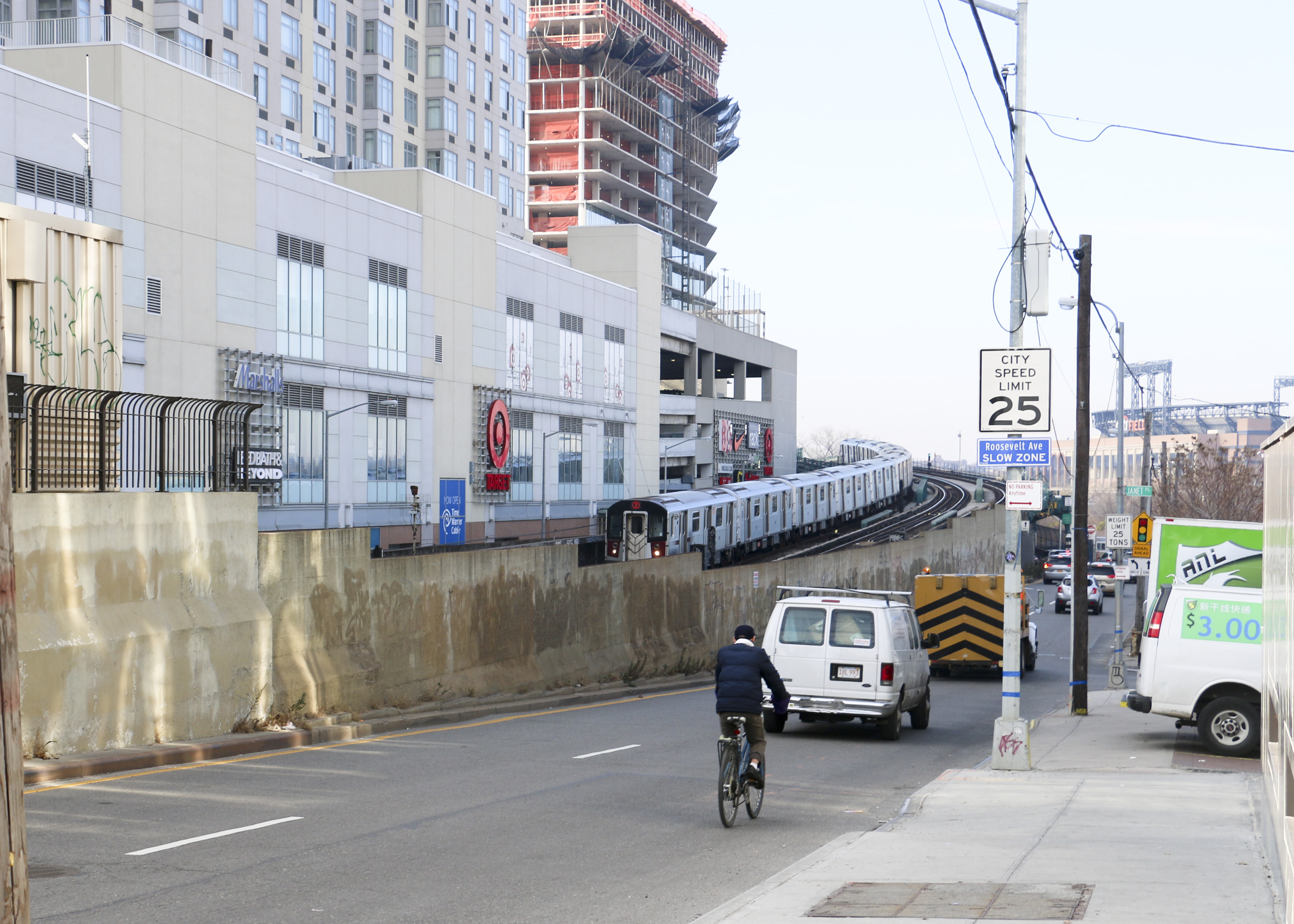
Flushing Line tunnel portal at College Point Boulevard

The station was not intended to be the Flushing Line's terminus. While the controversy over an elevated line in Flushing was ongoing in January 1913, the Whitestone Improvement Association pushed for an elevated to Whitestone, College Point, and Bayside. However, some members of that group wanted to oppose the Flushing line's construction if there was not going to be an extension to Whitestone. After the January 20 vote to demand that the subway line through Flushing be built underground, groups representing communities in south Flushing collaborated to push for an elevated along what was then the LIRR's Central Branch, in the current right-of-way of Kissena Corridor Park. Eleven days later, the PSC announced its intent to extend the line as an el from Corona to Flushing, with a possible further extension to Little Neck Bay in Bayside. There was consensus that the line should not abruptly end in Corona, but even with the 5.5-mile-long (8.9 km) extension to Bayside, the borough would still have fewer Dual Contracts route mileage than either Brooklyn or the Bronx. The New York Times wrote that compared to the Bronx, Queens would have far less subway mileage per capita even with the Flushing extension.

The Bayside extension was tentatively approved in June 1913, but only after the construction of the initial extension to Flushing. Under the revised subway expansion plan put forth in December 1913, the Flushing Line would be extended past Main Street, along and/or parallel to the right-of-way of the nearby Port Washington Branch of the LIRR towards Bell Boulevard in Bayside. A spur line would branch off north along 149th Street towards College Point.

In 1914, the PSC chairman and the commissioner committed to building the line toward Bayside. However, at the time, the LIRR and IRT were administered separately, and the IRT plan would require rebuilding a section of the Port Washington branch between the Broadway and Auburndale stations. The LIRR moved to block the IRT extension past Flushing since it would compete with the Port Washington Branch service in Bayside. One member of the United Civic Association submitted a proposal to the LIRR to let the IRT use the Port Washington Branch to serve Flushing and Bayside, using a connection between the two lines in Corona. The PSC supported the connection as an interim measure, and on March 11, 1915, it voted to let the Bayside connection be built. Subsequently, engineers surveying the planned intersection of the LIRR and IRT lines found that the IRT land would not actually overlap with any LIRR land. The LIRR president at the time, Ralph Peters, offered to lease the Port Washington and Whitestone Branches to the IRT for rapid transit use for $250,000 annually (equivalent to $7,960,000 in 2025), excluding other maintenance costs. The lease would last for ten years, with an option to extend the lease by ten more years. The PSC favored the idea of the IRT being a lessee along these lines, but did not know where to put the Corona connection. Even the majority of groups in eastern Queens supported the lease plan. The only group who opposed the lease agreement was the Flushing Association, who preferred the original Flushing subway plan.

Afterward, the PSC largely ignored the lease plan since it was still focused on building the first phase of the Dual Contracts. The Flushing Business Men's Association kept advocating for the Amity Street subway, causing a schism between them and the rest of the groups that supported the LIRR lease. Through the summer of 1915, the PSC and the LIRR negotiated the planned lease to $125,000 a first year, equivalent to $3,980,000 in 2025, with an eight percent increase each year; the negotiations then stalled in 1916. The Whitestone Improvement Association, impatient with the pace of negotiations, approved of the subway under Amity Street even though it would not serve them directly. The PSC's chief engineer wrote in a report that a combined 20,600 riders would use the Whitestone and Bayside lines each day in either direction, and that by 1927, there would be 34,000 riders per day per direction. The Third Ward Rapid Transit Association wrote a report showing how much they had petitioned for Flushing subway extensions to that point, compared to how little progress they had made in doing so. Negotiations continued to be stalled in 1917. Despite the line not having been extended past Corona yet, the idea of a subway extension to Little Neck encouraged development there.

The Whitestone Branch would have had to be rebuilt if it were leased to the subway, with railroad crossings removed and the single track doubled. The PSC located 14 places where crossings needed to be eliminated. However, by early 1917, there was barely enough money to build the subway to Flushing, let alone a link to Whitestone and Bayside. A lease agreement was announced on October 16, 1917, but the IRT withdrew from the agreement a month later, citing that it was inappropriate to enter such an agreement at that time. Thereafter, the PSC instead turned its attention back to the Main Street subway extension.

Even after the station opened in 1928, efforts to extend the line past Flushing persisted. In 1928, the New York City Board of Transportation (BOT) proposed allowing IRT trains to build a connection to use the Whitestone branch, but the IRT did not accept the offer since this would entail upgrading railroad crossings and the single-tracked line. Subsequently, the LIRR abandoned the branch in 1932. As part of the 1929 IND Second System plan, the Flushing Line would have had branches to College Point and Bayside east of Main Street. That plan was revived in 1939. The BOT kept proposing an extension of the Flushing Line past Main Street until 1945, when World War II ended and new budgets did not allow for a Flushing extension. In 1956, the Queens Chamber of Commerce and Queens Transit Committee again proposed the extensions east of the station to Bayside and College Point, along with a new spur along Kissena Boulevard running south to Sutphin Boulevard in Jamaica and eventually leading to John F. Kennedy International Airport. Since then, several New York City Transit Authority proposals for an eastward extension have all failed.

=== Later years ===
==== 1930s to 1960s ====
Following the station's opening, Downtown Flushing evolved into a major commercial and transit center, as development sprung around the section of Main Street near the station. On April 24, 1939, express trains began operating to and from the station, in conjunction with the reconstruction of the Willets Point station for the 1939 World's Fair. Due to the high level of passenger use, beginning in 1940 local residents requested an additional exit at the east end of the station, and the widening of existing staircases. A new eastern entrance was added after World War II. Ground broke on the new entrance on November 5, 1947, and it opened on October 28, 1948 with two new street stairs and an additional token booth. Upon its initial opening, the new entrance did little to relieve crowding at the main fare control area.

The city government took over the IRT's operations on June 12, 1940. The IRT routes were given numbered designations in 1948 with the introduction of "R-type" rolling stock, which contained rollsigns with numbered designations for each service. The route from Times Square to Flushing became known as the 7. On October 17, 1949, the joint BMT/IRT operation of the Flushing Line ended, and the line became the responsibility of the IRT. After the end of BMT/IRT dual service, the New York City Board of Transportation announced that the Flushing Line platforms would be lengthened to 11 IRT car lengths; the platforms were only able to fit nine 51-foot-long IRT cars beforehand. The platforms at Main Street and all other stations on the Flushing Line, with the exception of Queensboro Plaza, were extended in 1955–1956 to accommodate 565-foot-long (172 m), 11-car trains. An additional entrance was constructed to the north side of Roosevelt Avenue in the 1960s. However, nine-car trains continued to run on the 7 route until 1962, when they were extended to ten cars. With the opening of the 1964 New York World's Fair, trains were lengthened to eleven cars.

==== 1970s to present ====
A station renovation had been planned since the 1970s. In 1981, the Metropolitan Transportation Authority (MTA) listed the station among the 69 most deteriorated stations in the subway system. The MTA finally found funding for the station's renovation in 1994—at the expense of the renovations of 15 other stations, including three Franklin Avenue Line stations and the Atlantic Avenue–Pacific Street, Roosevelt Avenue/74th Street, and 161st Street–Yankee Stadium station complexes—because the station was a "vital station" for commuters from Eastern Queens. Between 1999 and 2000, the station underwent a major renovation project. The renovation added an elevator near the eastern Lippmann Plaza exit that made the station compliant with the Americans with Disabilities Act of 1990. The project also added new street entrances and a large entrance hall near Lippmann Plaza at the far east end of the station, beyond the bumper blocks at the end of the tracks.

The Flushing–Main Street station has been listed on the National Register of Historic Places since October 2004. The National Park Service listed the station because it was considered a good historic example of Squire J. Vickers architecture during the time of construction.

As part of the 2015–2019 MTA Capital Program, New York City allocated $300 million to be used for projects to increase subway station capacity and to make them ADA accessible. One of the projects being funded will increase station circulation at Main Street. Four additional staircases would be added between the platforms and the mezzanine; additional street to mezzanine staircases would be added at the northeastern, northwestern and southwestern corners of Roosevelt Avenue and Main Street; and two new entrance staircases leading from the west-most area of the mezzanine to Roosevelt Avenue halfway between Main Street and Prince Street would be constructed. To provide space for the new staircases to and from the mezzanine, several employee rooms would be relocated. At the bottom of each new staircase, a new fare control area would be installed in the mezzanine, with four turnstiles. In addition, the project would strengthen or reframe the mezzanine wall liner and roof level beams, and the four existing platform-to-mezzanine staircases would be modified and would receive ADA-compliant handrails and guardrails. The project also included five countdown clocks, 15 digital information displays, and new cameras. The design for this project was completed in January 2020, and construction was to have started in September 2020. Work on the new staircases began in June 2022, with an estimated cost of $61 million; at the time, the work was expected to be complete in October 2023.

The MTA announced in late 2022 that it would open customer service centers at 15 stations; the centers would provide services such as travel information and OMNY farecards. The first six customer service centers, including one at Flushing–Main Street, were to open in early 2023. The customer service center at the Main Street station opened in March 2023. The new staircases, entrances, and turnstiles were finished in November 2023; the project had cost $49 million, less than the original budget. The MTA announced in 2024 that it would replace the station's existing waist-high turnstiles with taller, wide-aisle turnstiles. The new fare gates were not installed immediately; in October 2026, the MTA announced plans to install taller fare gates with glass panels at 20 additional stations, including the Flushing–Main Street station (IRT Flushing Line), after the gates had been successfully piloted at earlier stations.

== Station layout ==
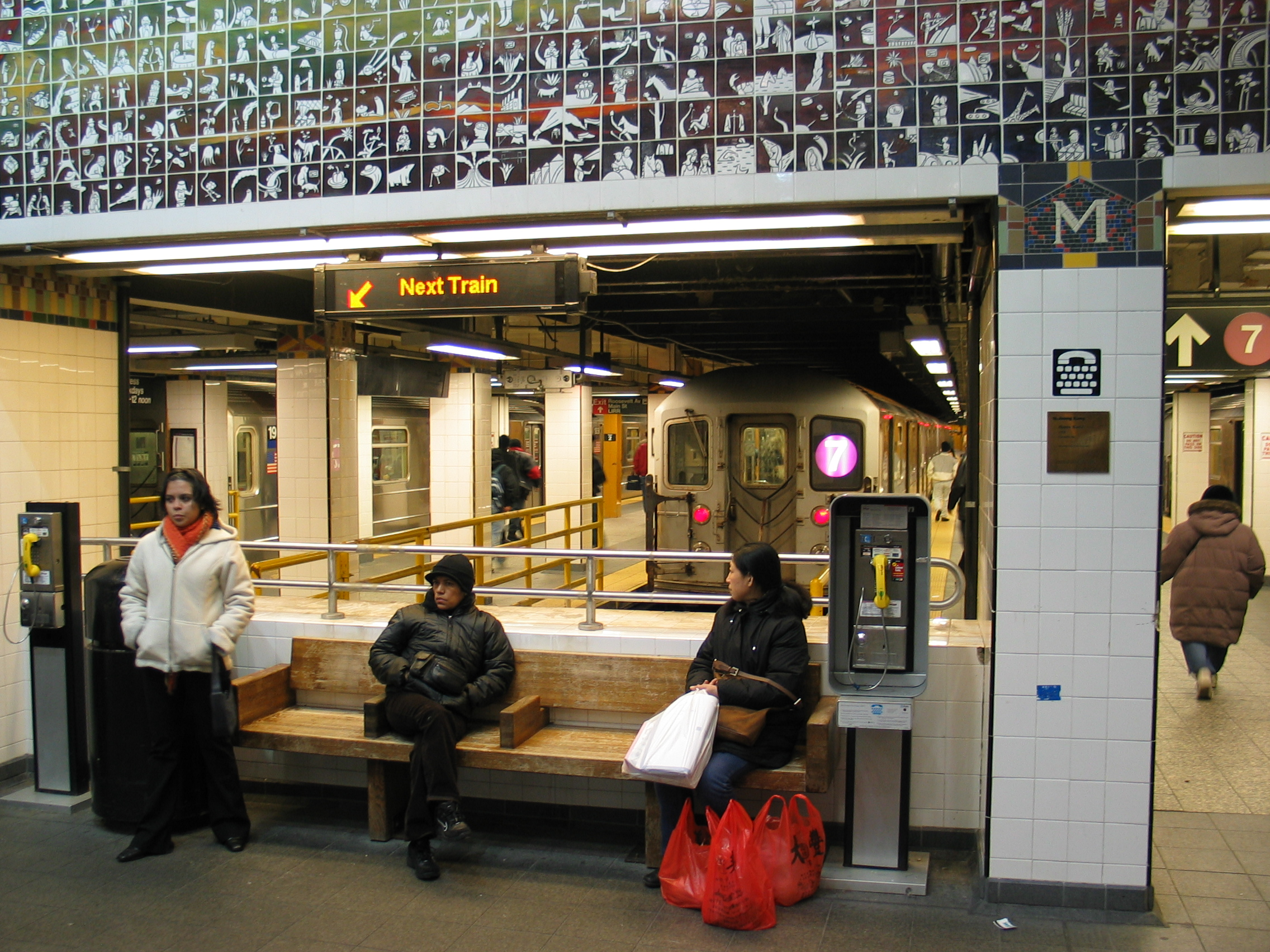
Eastern entrance's waiting area

The station has three tracks and two relatively narrow island platforms that are 16 feet 5 inches (5.00 m) wide. It is located entirely under Roosevelt Avenue, which is 50 feet (15 m) wide; the avenue was not widened when the subway was built. The 7 train stops here at all times, and the <7> train stops here during rush hours in the peak direction. The station is the eastern terminus for 7 trains; the next station to the west is Mets–Willets Point. Main Street is one of only seven underground stations on the Flushing Line, (Note: The other six underground stations are 34th Street–Hudson Yards, Times Square, Fifth Avenue, Grand Central, Vernon Boulevard–Jackson Avenue, and Hunters Point Avenue.) one of three underground stations on the line in Queens, (Note: The other two underground stations in Queens are Vernon Boulevard–Jackson Avenue and Hunters Point Avenue.) and the only underground station east of Hunters Point Avenue.

When peak-direction express service operates, express trains leave from the middle and southernmost tracks, Track M and Track 2 respectively, while local trains leave from Track 1. This system was instituted in November 1952. Fixed platform barriers, which are intended to prevent commuters falling to the tracks, are positioned near the platform edges. Mosaic wall tiles read "MAIN STREET", and small tiles along the platform walls read "M". The station was built with the cut-and-cover method. Its exterior walls consist of columns located at 5-foot (1.5 m) intervals, with the intermediate spaces filled with concrete.

At the west end of the platforms are the offices and dispatch tower for the IRT Flushing Line. Train crews report to the offices, while the dispatch tower dispatches trains and controls the Flushing Line. West of the station, the line rises from the tunnel via a portal at College Point Boulevard, and onto the elevated bridge across Flushing Creek.

=== Exits ===
There are nine entrances at street level, leading to two separate fare control areas. The original street exit is in the middle of the platforms with a separate mezzanine above the tracks, which contains the fare control area and the 24-hour station agent's booth. Staircases lead up to all four corners of Main Street and Roosevelt Avenue. Eight staircases lead from the mezzanine to platform level. An entrance used to lead from the mezzanine to the basement of a Woolworth's store, but this has been walled off. There were also restrooms along this mezzanine with corresponding tile mosaics.

The fare control area at Lippmann Plaza has an extremely high ceiling, with the lobby itself located approximately 40 feet (12 m) below the street level. The mezzanine is at platform level, and provides an ADA-compliant elevator, three unidirectional escalators, and a stairway to street level at Lippmann Plaza. New artwork titled Happy World was installed over the row of turnstiles in 1998. The plaza, also known as Lippmann Arcade, is a pedestrian walkway that leads to a municipal parking lot and several bus stops on 39th Avenue.

== Bus service ==
In addition to connecting with the nearby Long Island Rail Road station of the same name, the station serves as one of the two busiest local bus-subway interchanges in Queens (along with Jamaica Center) and the largest in North America, with over 20 bus routes running through or terminating in the area as of 2025.

Route	Operator	Stop location	North/West Terminal	South/East Terminal	via	notes
MTA-operated bus routes
Q12	NYCT	Roosevelt Avenue (near Lippmann Plaza)	Little Neck		Northern Boulevard	
Q13 Rush	NYCT	39th Avenue (near Lippmann Plaza)	Fort Totten		Sanford Avenue, Northern Boulevard, Bell Boulevard	Limited-stop "rush" service until Bell Boulevard, then local stops
Q15	NYCT	Roosevelt Avenue (near Lippmann Plaza)	Beechhurst		41st Avenue, 150th Street	
Q16	NYCT	39th Avenue (near Lippmann Plaza)	Fort Totten		Bayside Avenue	
Q17	NYCT	Main Street	Jamaica–Merrick Boulevard		Kissena Boulevard, Horace Harding Expressway, 188th Street, Hillside Avenue	
Q19	MTA Bus	Roosevelt Avenue (west of Main Street)	Astoria		Northern Boulevard, Astoria Boulevard	
Q20	NYCT	Main Street	College Point	Jamaica–Merrick Boulevard	20th Avenue, Main Street, Archer Avenue	
Q25	MTA Bus	Main Street	College Point	Jamaica–LIRR Station	127th Street, Kissena Boulevard, Parsons Boulevard	
Q26	MTA Bus	Roosevelt Avenue (near Lippmann Plaza)	College Point	Auburndale	Parsons Boulevard, 46th Avenue, Hollis Court Boulevard, College Point Boulevard	
Q27 Rush	NYCT	Main Street	Cambria Heights		Kissena Boulevard, Parsons Boulevard, 46th Avenue, 48th Avenue, Springfield Boulevard	Limited-stop "rush" service until Utopia Parkway, then local stops
Q28 Rush	MTA Bus	39th Avenue (near Lippmann Plaza)	Bay Terrace Shopping Center		Northern Boulevard, Crocheron Avenue, 32nd Avenue, Corporal Kennedy Street	Limited-stop "rush" service until 162nd Street, then local stops
Q44 SBS	NYCT	Main Street	Bronx Zoo–West Farms Square	Jamaica–Merrick Boulevard	Cross Bronx Expressway, Parsons Boulevard, Union Street, Main Street, Archer Avenue	Select Bus Service
Q50 LTD	MTA Bus	Main Street	Co-op City, Bronx (Rush hours) Pelham Bay Park (Off-Peak hours)		Whitestone Expressway, Hutchinson River Parkway, Bruckner Boulevard, Co-op City Boulevard	Limited-stop service
Q58	NYCT	41st Road	Ridgewood Terminal		College Point Boulevard, Corona Avenue, Grand Avenue, Fresh Pond Road	
Q61 LTD	NYCT	Roosevelt Avenue (near Lippmann Plaza)	Beechhurst		Willets Point Boulevard, Francis Lewis Bouevard, 154th Street	Limited-stop service
Q63 Rush	MTA Bus	Roosevelt Avenue (west of Main Street)	Long Island City–Queens Plaza		Northern Boulevard, Jackson Avenue	Limited-stop "rush" service until 114th Street, then local stops until Standard Lane and "rush" stops until Queens Plaza
Q65	MTA Bus	Main Street	Jamaica–LIRR Station		Sanford Avenue, 164th Street	
Q66	MTA Bus	Roosevelt Avenue (west of Main Street)	Long Island City–Queens Plaza		Northern Boulevard, 35th Avenue, 21st Street	
Q90 LTD	NYCT	Roosevelt Avenue (west of Main Street)	LaGuardia Airport		Roosevelt Avenue, 108th Street, Ditmars Boulevard	Limited-stop service
Q98 LTD	NYCT	41st Road	Ridgewood Terminal		College Point Boulevard, Horace Harding Expressway, Queens Boulevard, Grand Avenue, Fresh Pond Road	Limited-stop service
Nassau Inter-County Express (NICE)-operated bus routes
n20G	NICE Bus	Roosevelt Avenue (near Lippmann Plaza)	Great Neck LIRR Station		Northern Boulevard	Transfer at Great Neck for n20H to Hicksville
n20X	NICE Bus	Roosevelt Avenue (near Lippmann Plaza)	Roslyn Clock Tower		Northern Boulevard	Rush hours only

== Ridership ==
The passenger count for the station in 2019 was 17,568,837, making it the 12th busiest subway station system-wide, the busiest station outside of Manhattan, and the busiest station served by one service. This amounted to an average of 56,503 passengers per weekday. Due to the COVID-19 pandemic in New York City, ridership dropped drastically in 2020, with only 6,944,923 passengers entering the station that year. The Flushing–Main Street station was the 10th busiest station system-wide in 2020. However, due to a steep drop in ridership in Manhattan, it was no longer the busiest station outside Manhattan, having been surpassed by the Jackson Heights–Roosevelt Avenue/74th Street station.

== Attractions and points of interest ==
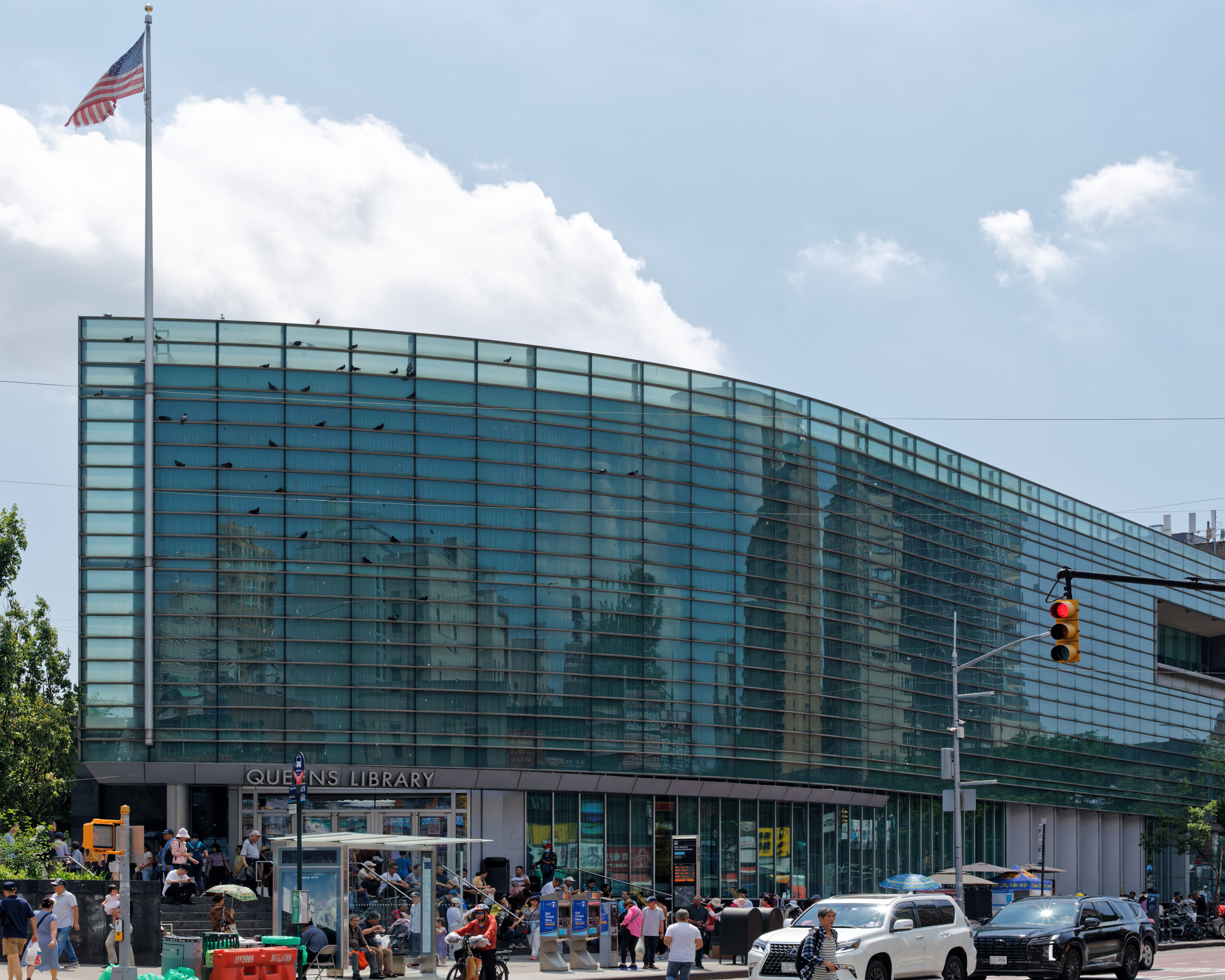
Queens Library in Flushing

The station is located in Downtown Flushing, also known as Flushing Chinatown, one of New York City's largest Asian enclaves.

Several city and national landmarks are located on the Queens Historical Society's Freedom Mile, which runs around downtown Flushing:

- Flushing Armory, on Northern Boulevard between Linden Place and Union Street
- Flushing High School on Northern Boulevard between Union and Bowne Streets
- Flushing Town Hall, at Northern Boulevard and Linden Place
- John Bowne House, at 37th Avenue and Bowne Street
- Kingsland Homestead and the Weeping Beech, at 37th Avenue west of Parsons Boulevard,
- Lewis H. Latimer House, at 137th Street and Leavitt Street
- Old Quaker Meeting House, at Northern Boulevard and Linden Place
- St. George's Church, on Main Street between 38th and 39th Avenues

Other points of interest include:

- Bowne Street Community Church, at Bowne Street and Roosevelt Avenue
- Flushing Main Post Office, on Main Street between Sanford and Maple Avenues
- Free Synagogue of Flushing, at Kissena Boulevard and Sanford Avenue
- Lippmann Plaza, between 39th Avenue and Roosevelt Avenue east of Main Street. Named after longtime Flushing businessman Paul Lippmann.
- Queens Library, Flushing Branch, at Main Street and Kissena Boulevard, the successor to the original Queens Library branch.

== Gallery ==
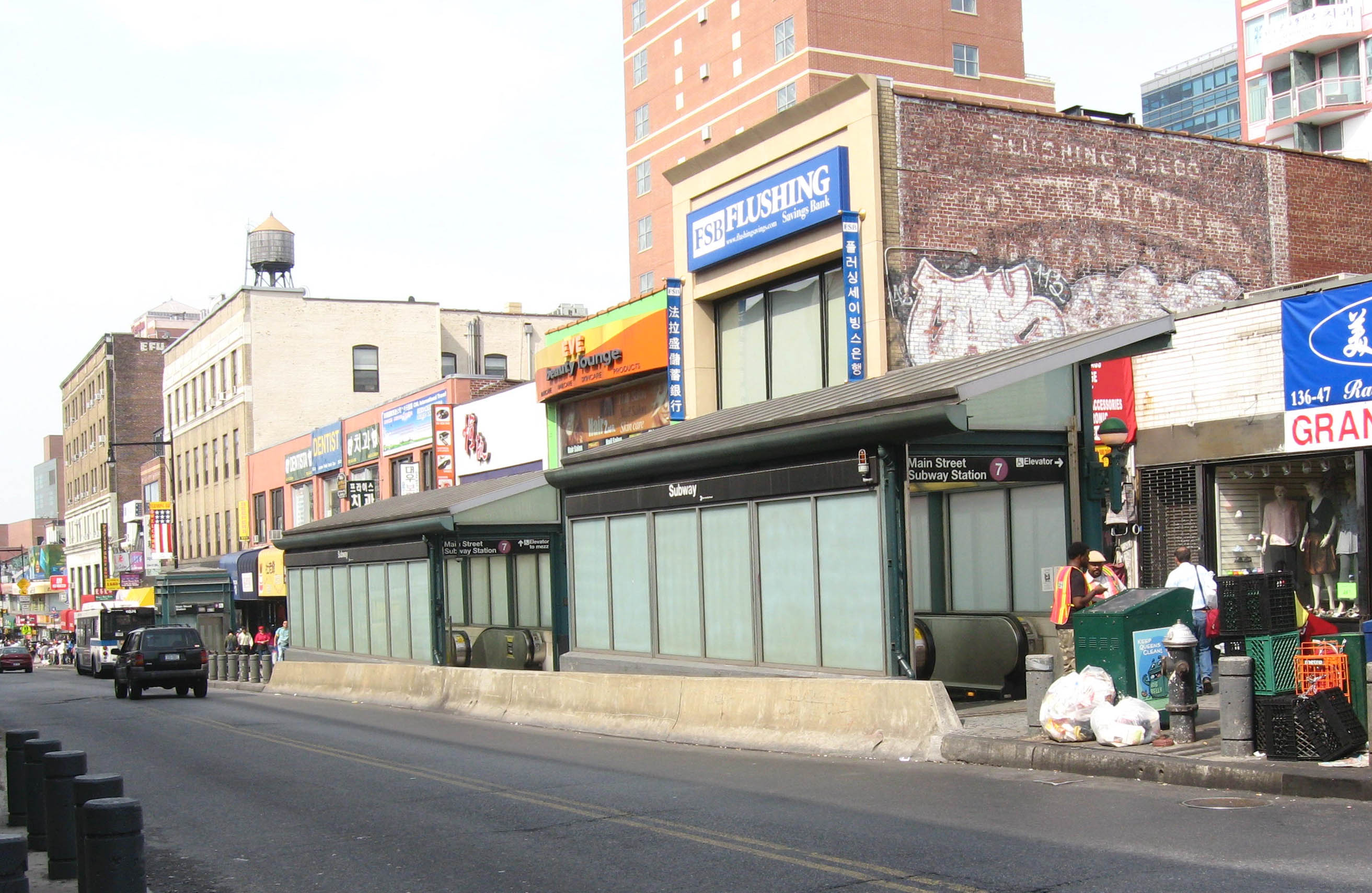
Eastern entrance, refurbished in 1999

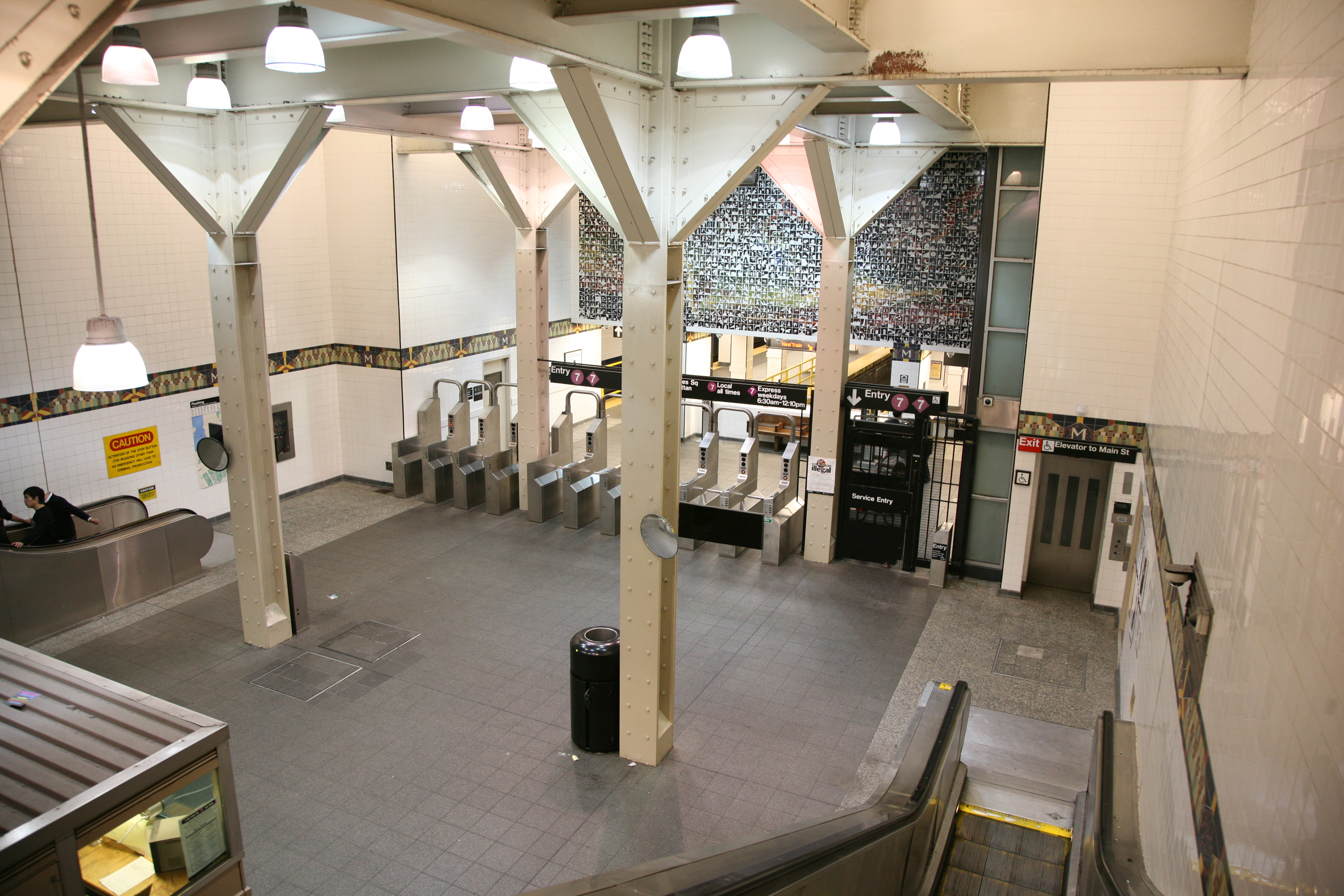
Eastern entrance ticket hall

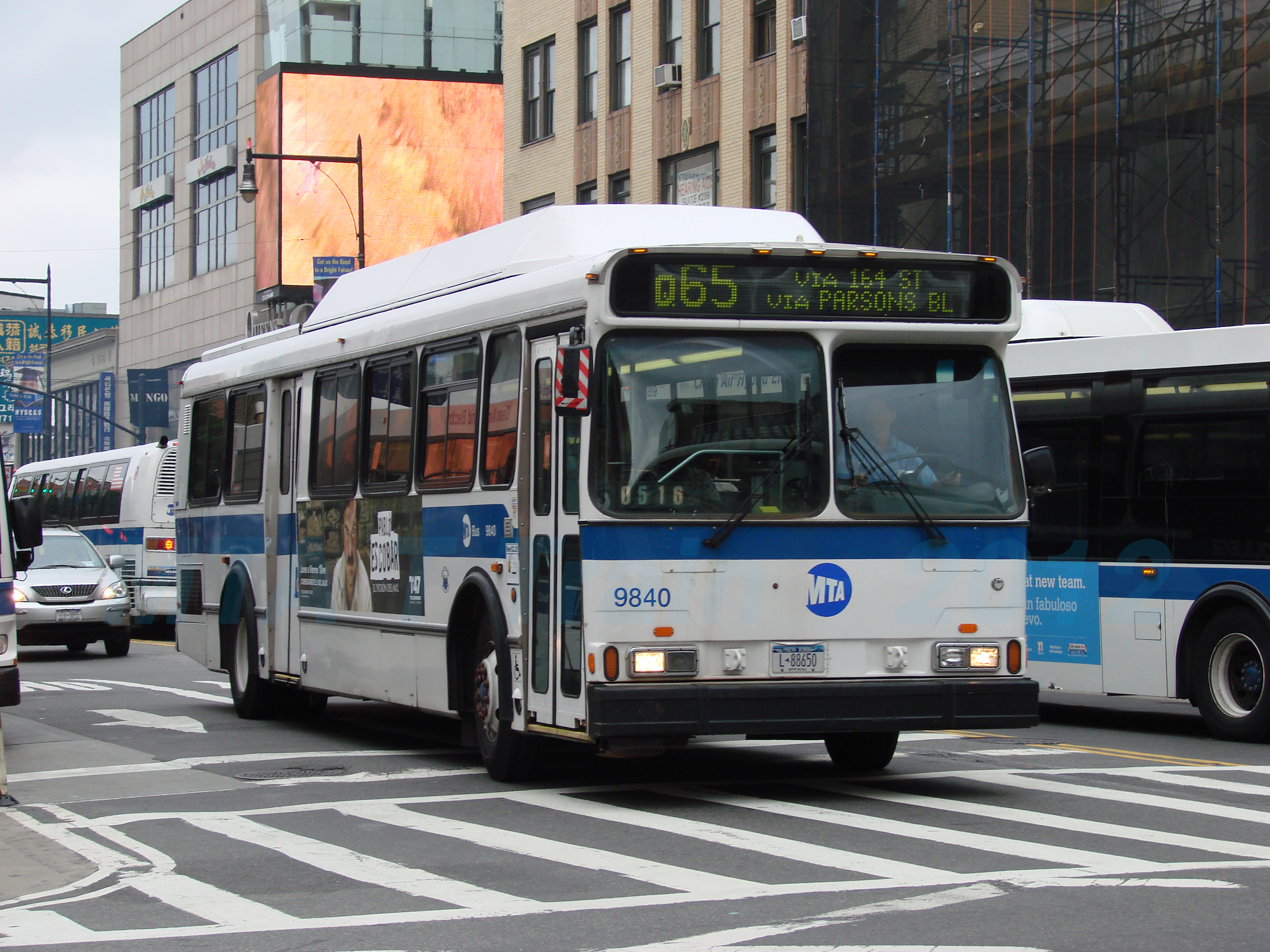
A Q65 bus outside the station, at Main Street and Roosevelt Avenue

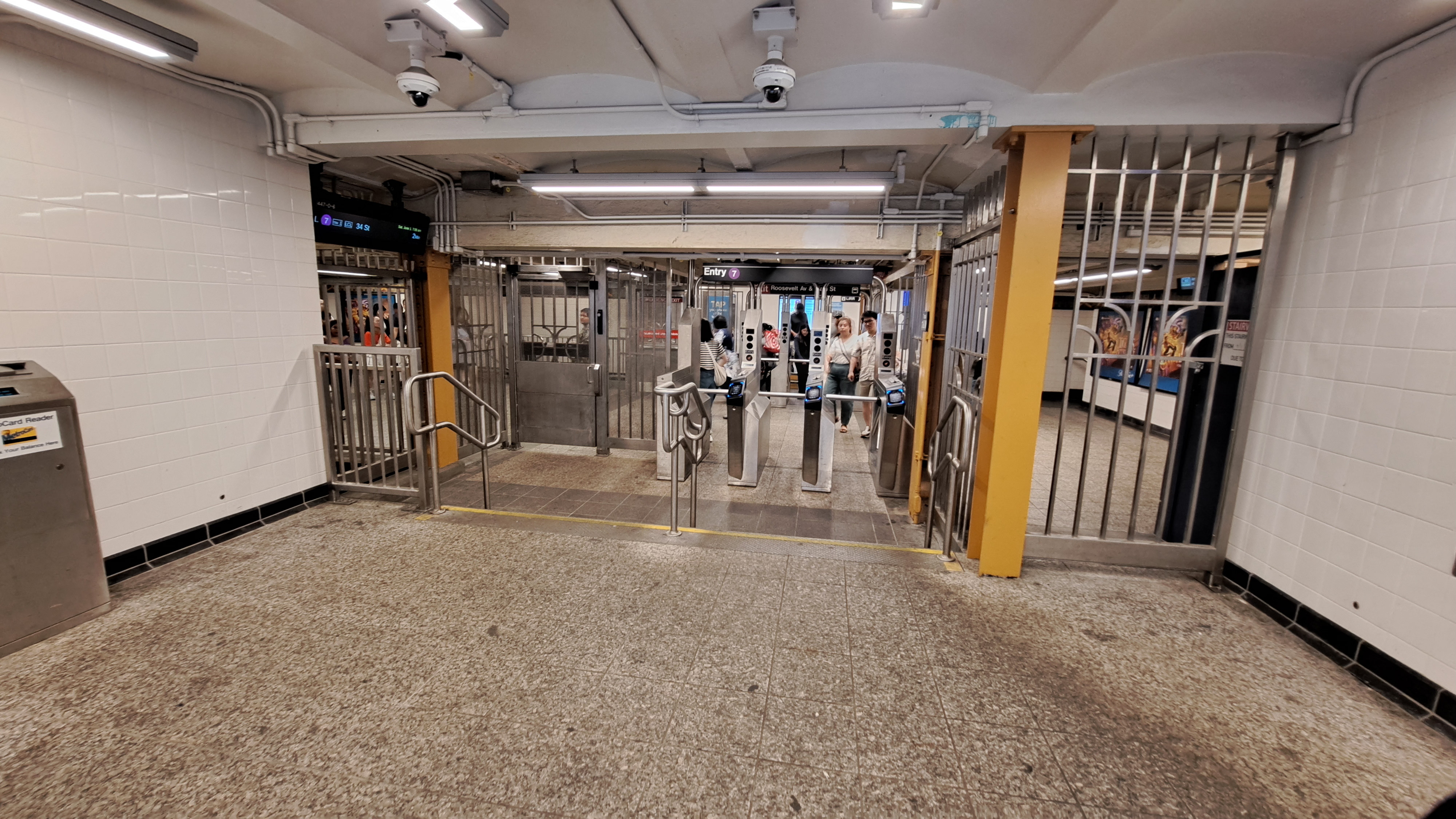
One of two new entrances, opened in 2023

== See also ==
- National Register of Historic Places listings in Queens, New York
