= Steinway Tunnel =

Tunnel under the East River in New York City

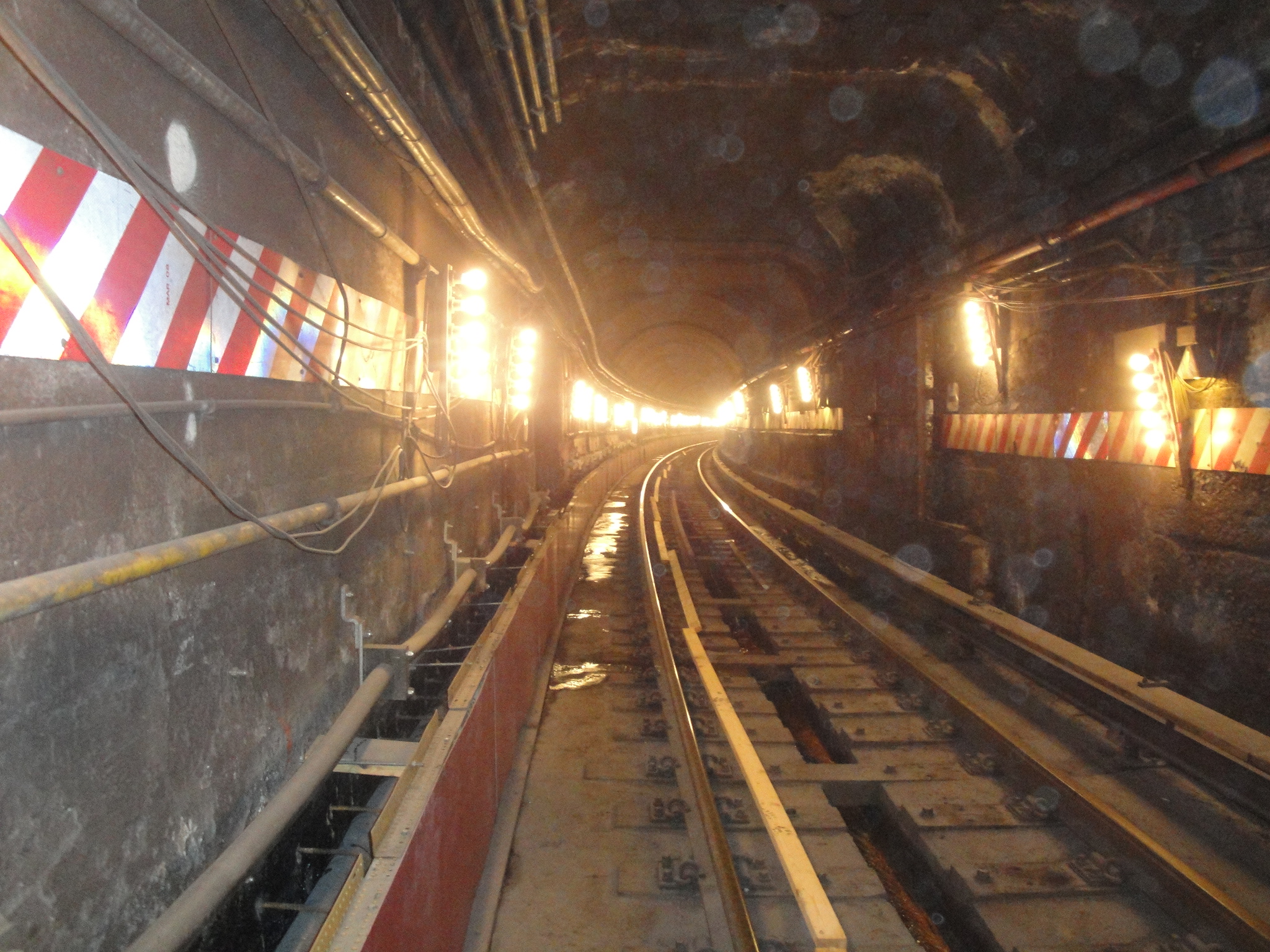
- A view of one of the tubes in the Steinway Tunnel in February 2013
- Interactive map of Steinway Tunnel

Overview
- Line: IRT Flushing Line (7 and <7> trains)
- Location: East River between Manhattan and Queens in New York City
- System: New York City Subway

Operation
- Opened: June 13, 1915; 111 years ago
- Operator: Metropolitan Transportation Authority

Technical
- Length: 1.3 miles (2.1 km)
- No. of tracks: 2

The Steinway Tunnel (officially known as the Steinway Tube) is a pair of tubes carrying the IRT Flushing Line (7 and <7> trains) of the New York City Subway under the East River between 42nd Street in Manhattan and 50th Avenue in Long Island City, Queens, in New York City. It was originally designed and built as an interurban trolley tunnel (with a narrow loading gauge and height), with stations near the current Hunters Point Avenue and Grand Central stations.

Planning for the tunnel began in 1885 but construction did not start until 1892 due to a lack of funds. The Steinway Tunnel was named for William Steinway, who provided the funding to start the initial construction. Steinway died in 1896 before the tunnel was completed, and the project sat dormant for several years, before the Interborough Rapid Transit Company (IRT) acquired the tunnel. The IRT resumed work in 1905 and completed the tubes in 1907 and was briefly opened for trolley service that September. Due to legal disputes, the tubes closed within a week and did not reopen for another eight years. After the Dual Contracts were signed in 1913, the IRT began converting the tubes to subway use, and the tubes opened as part of the Flushing Line in 1915. In subsequent years, specific rolling stock were ordered to navigate the narrow dimensions of the tubes, and the tunnel suffered from numerous floods and fires.

== Initial work ==
The East River Tunnel Railroad Company was founded on February 22, 1885, to construct a railroad tunnel crossing the East River. Its objective was to connect the Long Island Rail Road (LIRR)'s tracks in Long Island City and the New York Central & Hudson River Railroad's tracks in the City of New York in the same tunnel. At that time period, movement through the New York metropolitan area was hampered by many large bodies of water such as the East River; there were no crossings across these water bodies, except for ferry service, which was not always possible or practical. In addition, plans to build the Blackwell's Island Bridge (later the Queensboro Bridge) were stagnant at the time. The East River Tunnel Railroad Company soon dissolved, and on July 22, 1887, Walter S. Gurnee and Malcolm W. Niven founded the New York and Long Island Railroad Company (NY&LIRR), which began planning for the tunnel shortly afterward.

The tunnel was to begin on the New York side near the Hudson River docks in Manhattan, from there it would go east along 42nd Street to Grand Central and carry straight on under the East River. In Long Island City, the tunnel portals were to be between 5th Street (now 49th Avenue) and 4th Street (now 50th Avenue). It would go under Jackson Avenue and finally Thomson Avenue, intersecting LIRR tracks at Hunterspoint Avenue. The total cost of the 5.6-mile (9.0 km) tunnel was to be US$11.7 million. The estimated total cost exceeded the financial capabilities of the company by far. In July 1891, piano maker William Steinway, a major landowner in Astoria, Queens, started to fund the tunnel. He became a major shareholder and became the new chairman of the company, so the tunnel was named after him. Steinway advised the company to utilize electricity to power the tunnel, believing that the construction of the tunnel would increase real-estate values within the vicinity.

The route was finalized in the City of New York in 1890 and in Long Island City by 1891. Construction was started on June 7, 1892, as a NY&LIRR project, and the bottom of the tunnel shaft was reached in December of the same year. However, soon after the start of construction, there were many complications. The project was difficult due to complex geological formations beneath the river, and there were frequent blowouts and floods. Construction was curtailed following an accident on December 28, 1892, during an attempt to heat frozen dynamite from an 85-foot (26 m) shaft at the corner of Vernon Boulevard, Jackson Avenue and 50th Avenue. An uncontrolled explosion killed five and injured fifty, and heavily damaged numerous surrounding houses. Due to high compensation claims, the company was financially ruined, and attempts to raise additional funds failed because of the stock market crash of 1893. Work was stopped as a result, and it was boarded up. Investors refused to fund the tunnel because they feared that it was unsafe. Attempts to resume construction were occasionally made until Steinway died in 1896.

== The Belmont era ==
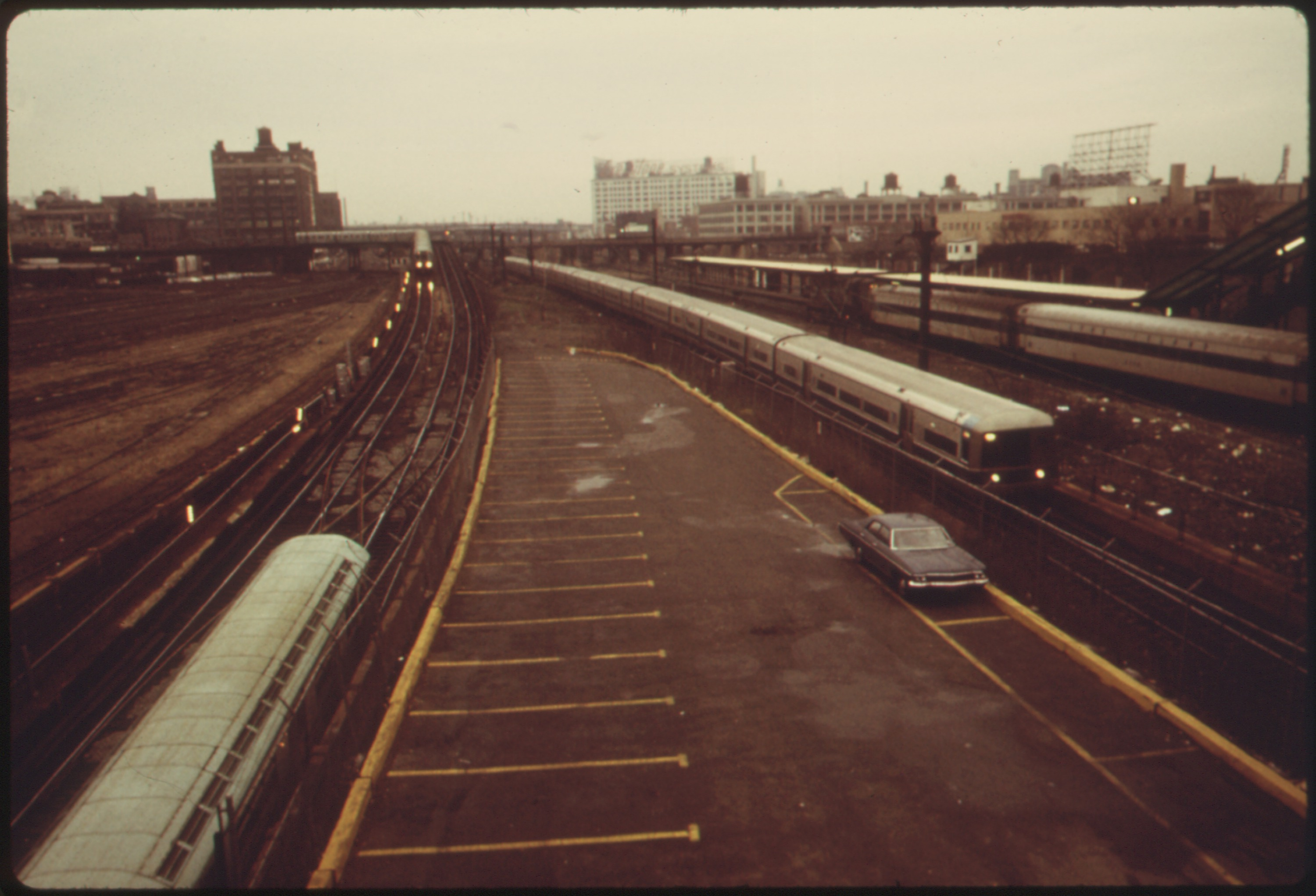
The Steinway Tunnel's Queens portals at left; to the right are the East River Tunnels' portals. Pictured in April 1974.

In 1900, the Interborough Rapid Transit Company (IRT), headed by August Belmont Jr., was awarded the contract for construction and operation of the city's subway line and a few years later the IRT engineered a takeover of Manhattan's elevated railways, thus gaining a monopoly on the city's rapid transit services. In February 1902, the IRT bought the New York & Long Island Railroad and tram operators New York and Queens County Railway for a similar monopoly in Queens.

The IRT prepared surveys and plans from scratch. For the proposed tram service under the East River, the plans for the tunnel were modified for dedicated tram operation. The tunnel's trackbed was raised, the gradient increased, and the route shortened. The tunnel was to turn at a loop at the corner of 42nd Street and Park Avenue in Manhattan and go as far as Vernon Boulevard in Queens. There, a ramp was to connect to the New York and Queens County Railway. These three underground stations were Lexington Avenue in Manhattan and Jackson Avenue and Van Alst Avenue in Queens. The total cost amounted to $8 million. The city objected to the tunnel project multiple times and after several disasters nearly stopped it.

The westernmost of the four shafts for the tunnel was in Manhattan and was numbered #1, while the easternmost shaft, in Queens, was numbered #4. Construction began on July 14, 1905, when shaft #4 was sunk; shaft #2 on the opposite shore was sunk by September 1. Shaft #3 was sunk in the Man-O-War Reef, a granite outcrop in the East River that was expanded and renamed Belmont Island. Four workers were killed in a 1906 shaft accident under Belmont Island. The tunnel was holed through on May 16, 1907, and was completed in September of that year, after 26 months of construction. Buildings for the tunnel's construction had been erected on Belmont Island; these stayed up until at least 1918.

Fifty tramcars were made available for operation through the tunnel. They possessed a 42-foot-5-inch (12.93 m)-long and 8-foot-11-inch (2.72 m)-wide all-steel superstructure with double-sided semi-open entrances at the ends. Power was drawn from an iron rail on the ceiling, to which the car roof's 11 3/8-inch (290 mm)-high pantograph would attach. The cars were also fitted with rod pantographs for street operation.

The first trolley trip in the Steinway Tunnel was scheduled for September 20, 1907, but was postponed due to a power failure. Shortly afterward, (Note: The New York Times cites September 21 as the date of the first trolley run. while author Clifton Hood cites September 24.) trolley cars ran through the tunnel as part of a demonstration run. On September 29, 1907, a short circuit on the overhead wires caused a small fire, and the tunnel was shut down. Belmont did not have a franchise to operate a transit line. The concession to operate the tunnel had expired on January 1, 1907, and the city of New York was unwilling to renew the contract. For the next five years, the tunnel, with trolley loops on both the Manhattan and Queens sides, remained unused. In 1913, Belmont sold the tunnel to the city government after the IRT signed the Dual Contracts, which incorporated the Steinway Tunnel as part of the new Flushing subway line.

== Subway operation ==
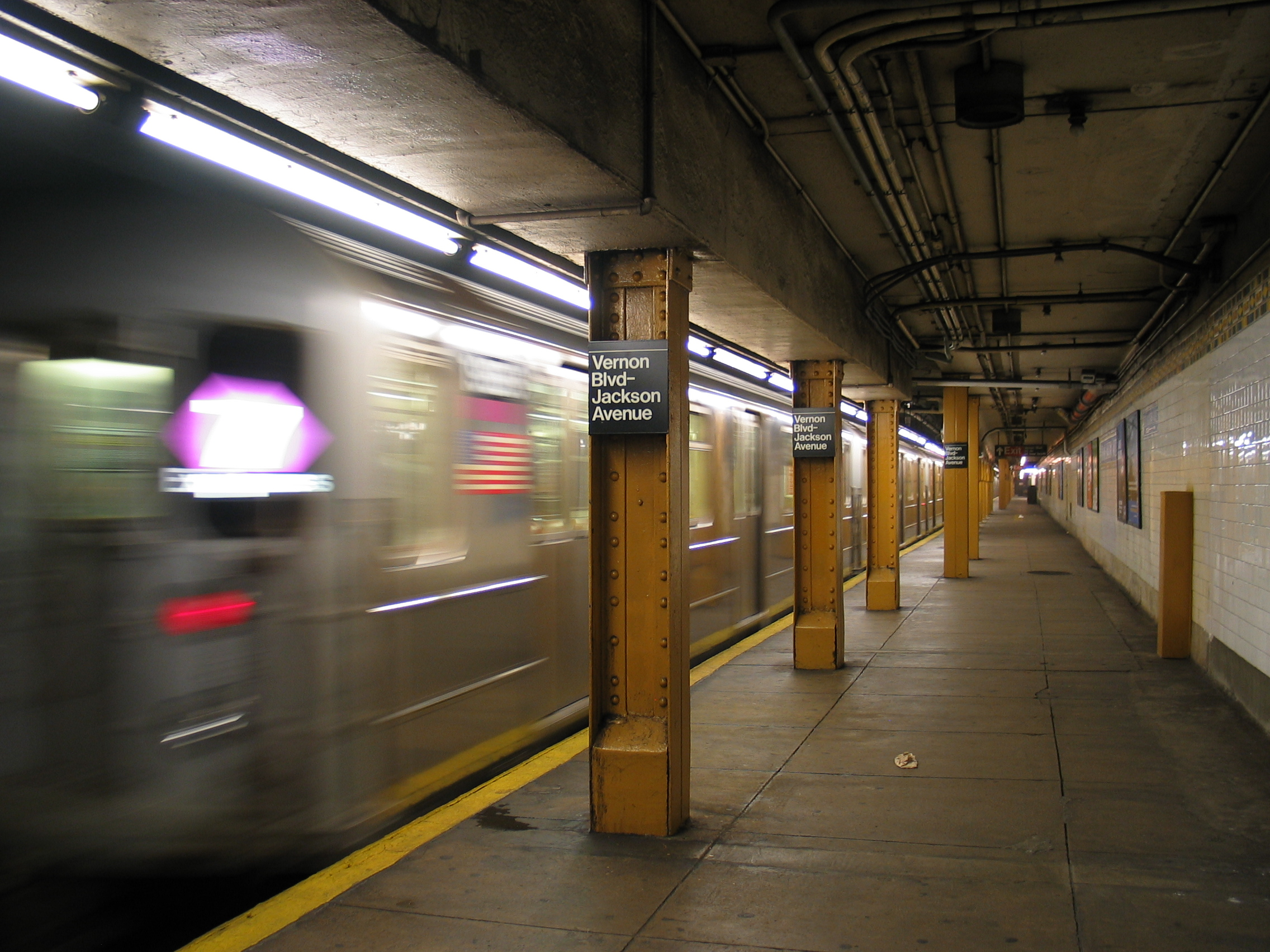
Vernon Boulevard–Jackson Avenue station, one of three original subway stations in the Steinway Tunnel

Initially, the IRT intended to use the tunnel for trolleys; however, it subsequently decided instead to use the tubes for a heavy-rail rapid transit line, a concept that later became known as premetro. After the IRT measured the tubes, the company found that third rail installation could be possible with small modifications. Regular subway cars could not use the loops and the ramp because of the tight 50-foot (15 m) radius of the loops and the steep 6% incline. The roadbed and the rail were determined to be usable for subway service, but even so, the duct banks in the tunnel were replaced. The platforms could be easily extended, and it was also found that the tunnel's width corresponded to the width specifications of the existing IRT subway's car fleet.

Work began in 1913, and the tubes were modified to accommodate IRT subway cars in 1914. The work included removing part of the tunnel walls on the Manhattan side and building a cavern to create a track crossover between the tubes. The first IRT Steinway test train between Grand Central and Vernon Avenue (today's Vernon Boulevard–Jackson Avenue station) ran June 13, 1915, with a regularly scheduled shuttle service beginning June 22. The planned metro route was to go from Times Square through the tunnel over to Long Island City and from there continue towards Flushing. The IRT was to operate this line, with the trackage east of Queensboro Plaza to be shared by the Brooklyn Rapid Transit Company (later the Brooklyn–Manhattan Transit Corporation, or BMT).

Meanwhile, the construction work continued on the planned route. To the east of the tunnel, the Hunters Point Avenue subway station went up to the level of the Hunterspoint Avenue LIRR station. Immediately east of it was a ramp up to the elevated subway towards Queensboro Plaza. Hunters Point Avenue opened on February 15, 1916, and on November 5 of the same year, it was extended to Queensboro Plaza. Because the line did not have track connections to the rest of the IRT network, a provisional maintenance workshop was operated at the tunnel ramp until 1928. To the west, construction began in 1922. The tunnel was extended to Fifth Avenue on March 23, 1926, and Times Square on March 14, 1927. When Belmont modified the IRT Flushing Line to extend to Times Square and to Flushing, it was found that the loops could not be used for the extensions. The loops on the Queens side of the tunnel were obliterated in the wake of new construction. The loop on the Manhattan side, however, is intact and occupied by maintenance rooms, although the ceiling third rail still exists in the loop. The line from Times Square to Flushing was completed in 1928, when the station at Flushing opened.

Since the tunnel ramps towards Queens were significantly steeper than normal IRT specifications, with a gradient of 4%, special rolling stock had to be procured for the Steinway Tunnel line. The "Steinway"-type subway car had the same dimensions as an ordinary subway cars of the IRT, but included modified gear boxes. Initially, twelve single-car consists were approved for the original shuttle. Because of additional construction to the route, another 126 cars were added to the fleet. The 50 "World's Fair"-type cars, used for the 1939 New York World's Fair, used the same type of gear boxes. With the 1948 introduction of four-motor subway cars of types R12 and R14, the need for a special drive was gone, as the Steinway Tunnel could now be driven by conventional railcars. In 1949, BMT services stopped operating on the Flushing Line east of Queensboro Plaza, and the IRT was assigned exclusive operation of the line.

In subsequent years, the tubes of the Steinway Tunnel were difficult to maintain: they were prone to flooding, and the tube walls were much narrower than other tunnels in the subway system, with almost no clearance on each side of the train. After a train got stuck in the tunnel in 1971, a passenger died of a heart attack. A fire broke out on a train in the tunnel in 1973, killing one passenger and trapping over a thousand in the middle of the tunnel, after the collapse of an archway. In 1991, the tubes were flooded to 8 feet (2.4 m) after a water main broke on the Manhattan side. The next year, an electrical fire in the tunnel melted several feet of steel rail, although the tunnel's exhaust fans were working properly. After Hurricane Sandy-related storm surges flooded the tunnel in 2012, the tubes were rebuilt in a $29 million project that took place between 2013 and April 2016. To protect the tunnel from future flooding, two retaining walls will be installed on either side of the tunnel portal in Queens, and flex gates would be installed to prevent water from entering the tunnel. The project is estimated to cost $15 million, work was scheduled to begin in May 2021 and was still ongoing in 2024.
