= Hunters Point Avenue station =

New York City Subway station in Queens

Hunters Point Avenue
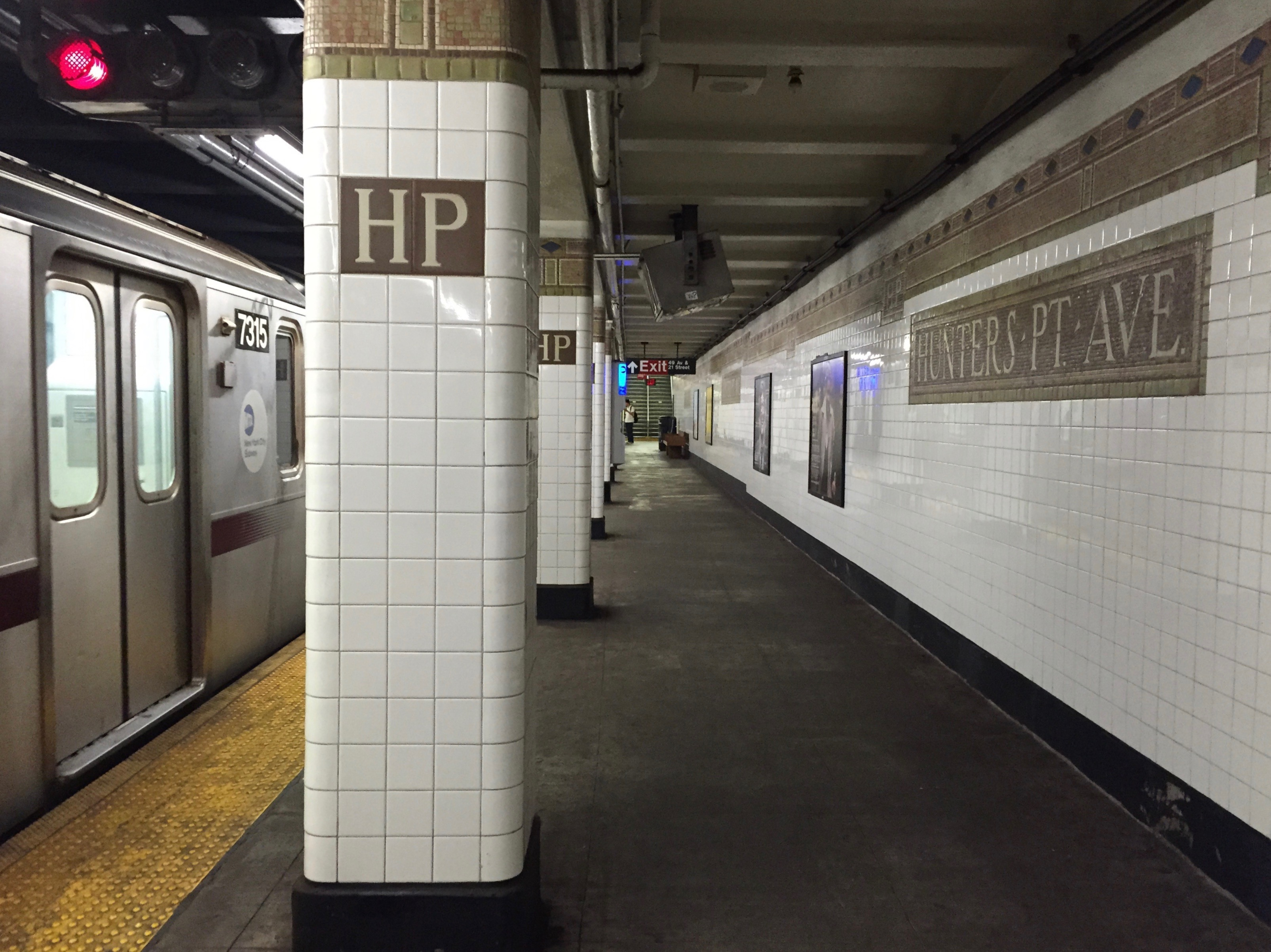
- An R188 7 train at the northbound platform

Station statistics
- Address: 49th Avenue & 21st Street; Queens, New York
- Borough: Queens
- Locale: Hunters Point, Long Island City
- Coordinates: 40°44′32.57″N 73°56′57.33″W
- Division: A (IRT)
- Line: IRT Flushing Line
- Services: 7 (all times) <7> (rush hours until 9:30 p.m., peak direction)
- Transit: NYCT Bus: B32, B62, Q67 MTA Bus: Q101, Q103 (at Jackson Avenue); LIRR Hunterspoint Avenue station
- Structure: Underground
- Platforms: 2 side platforms
- Tracks: 2

Other information
- Opened: February 15, 1916; 110 years ago
- Former/other names: 49th Avenue

Traffic
- 2025: 1,055,799 ▲3.1%
- Rank: 301 out of 423
Services
| Preceding station | New York City Subway | Following station |
|---|---|---|
| Vernon Boulevard–Jackson Avenue 7 <7> toward 34th Street–Hudson Yards | 7 (New York City Subway service) | Court Square 7 <7> toward Flushing–Main Street |
Location
Location within New York City Subway
Location within New York City
Location within New York
Track layout
Street map
Station service legend
| Symbol | Description |
| Stops all times | Stops all times |
| Stops rush hours in the peak direction only | Stops rush hours in the peak direction only |

The Hunters Point Avenue station is a station on the IRT Flushing Line of the New York City Subway. Located at 49th Avenue (formerly Hunters Point Avenue) and 21st Street in the intersections of Hunters Point and Long Island City, Queens, it is served by the 7 train at all times and the <7> train during rush hours in the peak direction.

== History ==
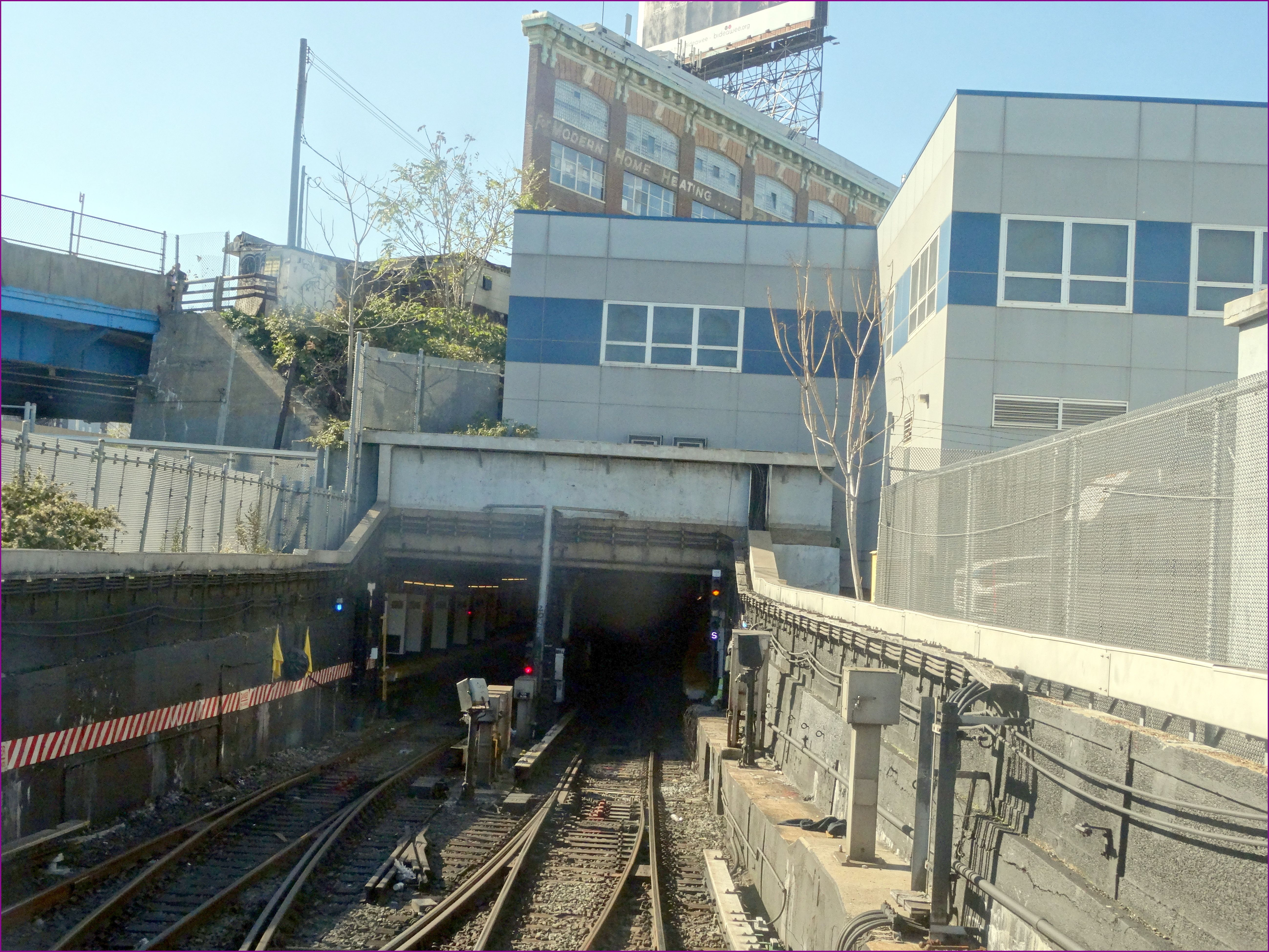
Subway portal looking towards station

As part of its development, what is now the Flushing Line was extended one stop East, from Vernon–Jackson Avenues, which opened in 1915, to Hunters Point Avenue on February 15, 1916. Later that year it would again be extended to Court Square–23rd Street station.

The city government took over the IRT's operations on June 12, 1940. The IRT routes were given numbered designations in 1948 with the introduction of "R-type" rolling stock, which contained rollsigns with numbered designations for each service. The route from Times Square to Flushing became known as the 7. In 1949, the New York City Board of Transportation announced that the Flushing Line platforms would be lengthened to 11 IRT car lengths; the platforms were only able to fit nine 51 foot (16 m) long IRT cars beforehand. The platforms at the station were extended in 1955–1956 to accommodate 11-car trains. However, nine-car trains continued to run on the 7 route until 1962, when they were extended to ten cars.

== Station layout ==
This station is the easternmost (railroad north) underground station on the Flushing Line until the northbound terminal station (Flushing – Main Street). The tunnel portal is at the eastern end of the station. Just outside the portal is a diamond crossover linking the two tracks.

This station has two tracks and two side platforms. Its architecture is in an Italianate design of brown color. Tilework includes a trimline with "HP" tiles on it and name tablets reading "HUNTERS POINT AVE." in gold serif font. The platform columns also have a trim line with "HP" tiles below them.

=== Exits ===
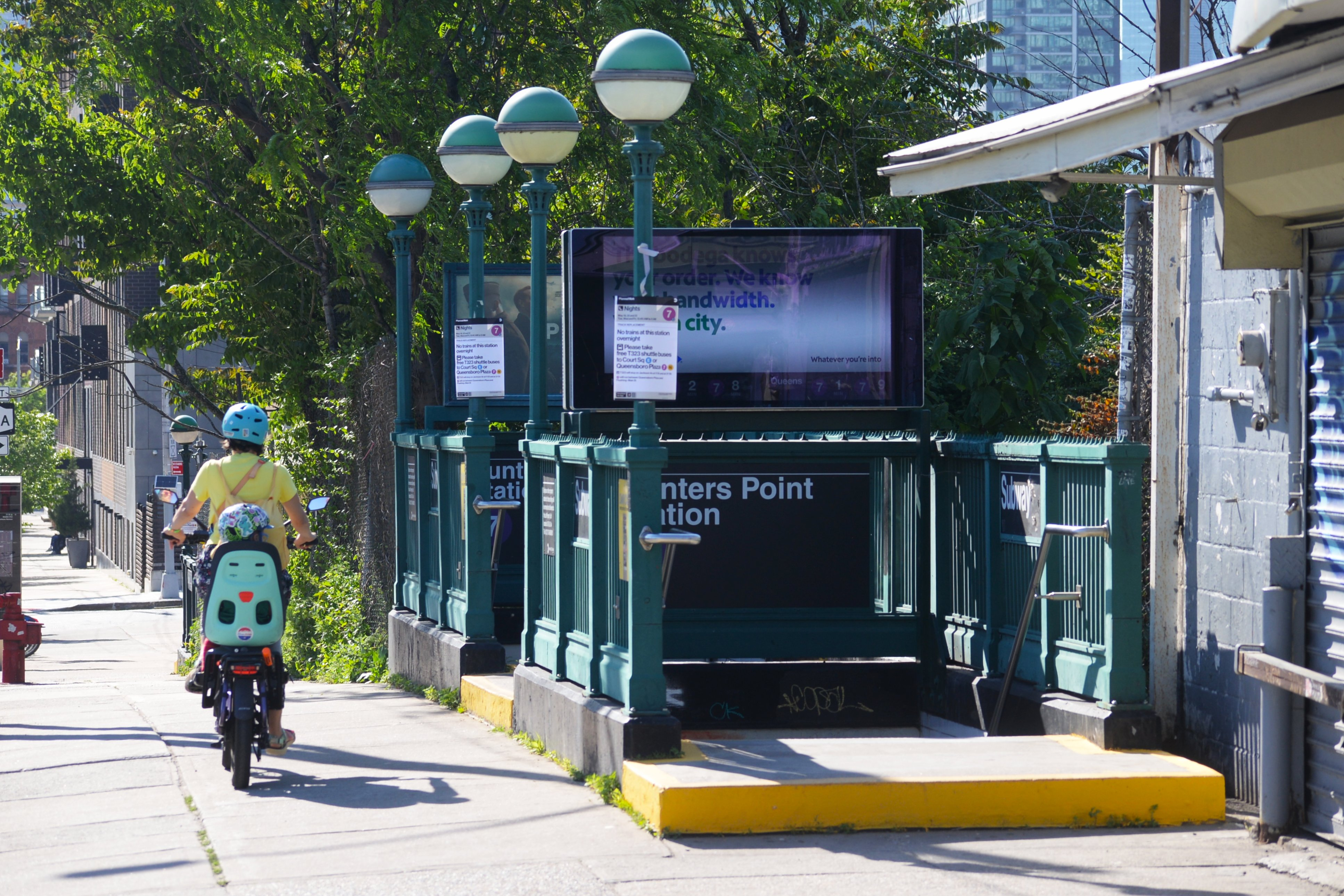
Eastern staircases

This station has one fare control area above the platforms and tracks near the north end. Two staircases from each platform go up to a waiting area/crossover, where a turnstile bank and several exit–only turnstiles provide access to and from the station. Outside fare control, there is a token booth and one staircase going up to the north side of 49th Avenue with 21st Street several hundred yards to the west. Two other staircases to the east go up to the north side of the same street, near the Long Island Rail Road's Hunterspoint Avenue station.

On October 29, 1982, a public hearing was scheduled concerning the planned closure of the entrance leading to the southeast corner of 49th Avenue and 21st Street as part of the New York City Transit Authority's Station Modernization Program.
