= 34th Street (Manhattan) =

West-east street in Manhattan, New York

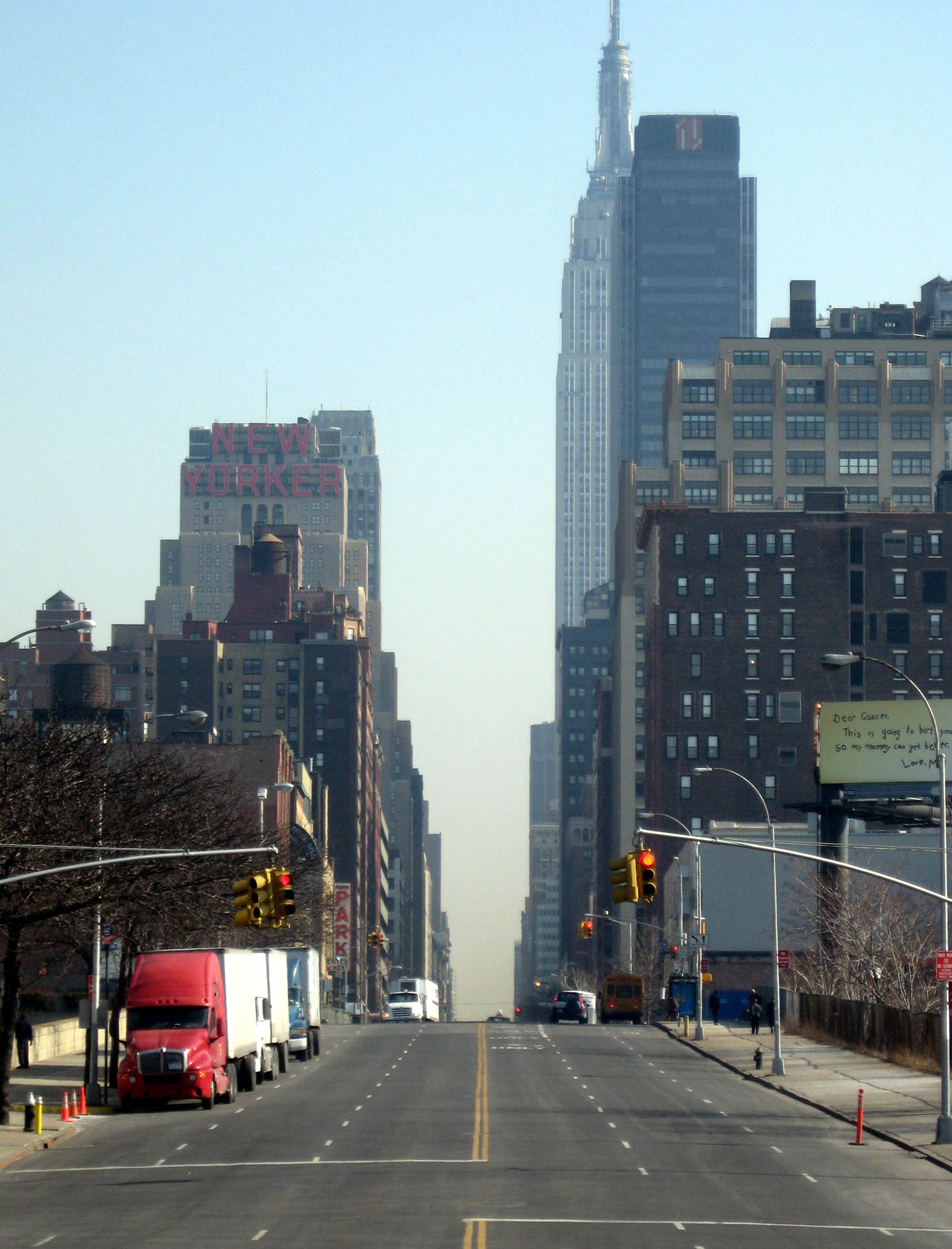
- From the west end of 34th Street, looking east (c. 2009)
- Maintained by: NYCDOT
- Length: 2.0 mi (3.2 km)
- Location: Manhattan, New York City
- Postal code: 10001, 10121, 10016
- Coordinates: 40.7506°N 73.9896°W
- West end: NY 9A / West Side Highway in Hudson Yards
- East end: FDR Drive in Kips Bay
- North: 40th Street (west of 11th Avenue); 35th Street (east of 11th Avenue)
- South: 33rd Street (west of 1st Avenue); 30th Street (east of 1st Avenue)

Construction
- Commissioned: March 1811

34th Street is a major crosstown street in the New York City borough of Manhattan. It runs the two-mile (3.2 km) width of Manhattan Island from the West Side Highway on the West Side to FDR Drive on the East Side. 34th Street is used as a crosstown artery between New Jersey to the west and Queens to the east, connecting the Lincoln Tunnel to New Jersey with the Queens–Midtown Tunnel to Long Island.

Several notable buildings are located directly along 34th Street, including the Empire State Building, Macy's Herald Square, and Javits Center. Other structures, such as Pennsylvania Station, are located within one block of 34th Street. The street is served by the crosstown M34/M34A bus routes and contains several subway stops.

== History ==
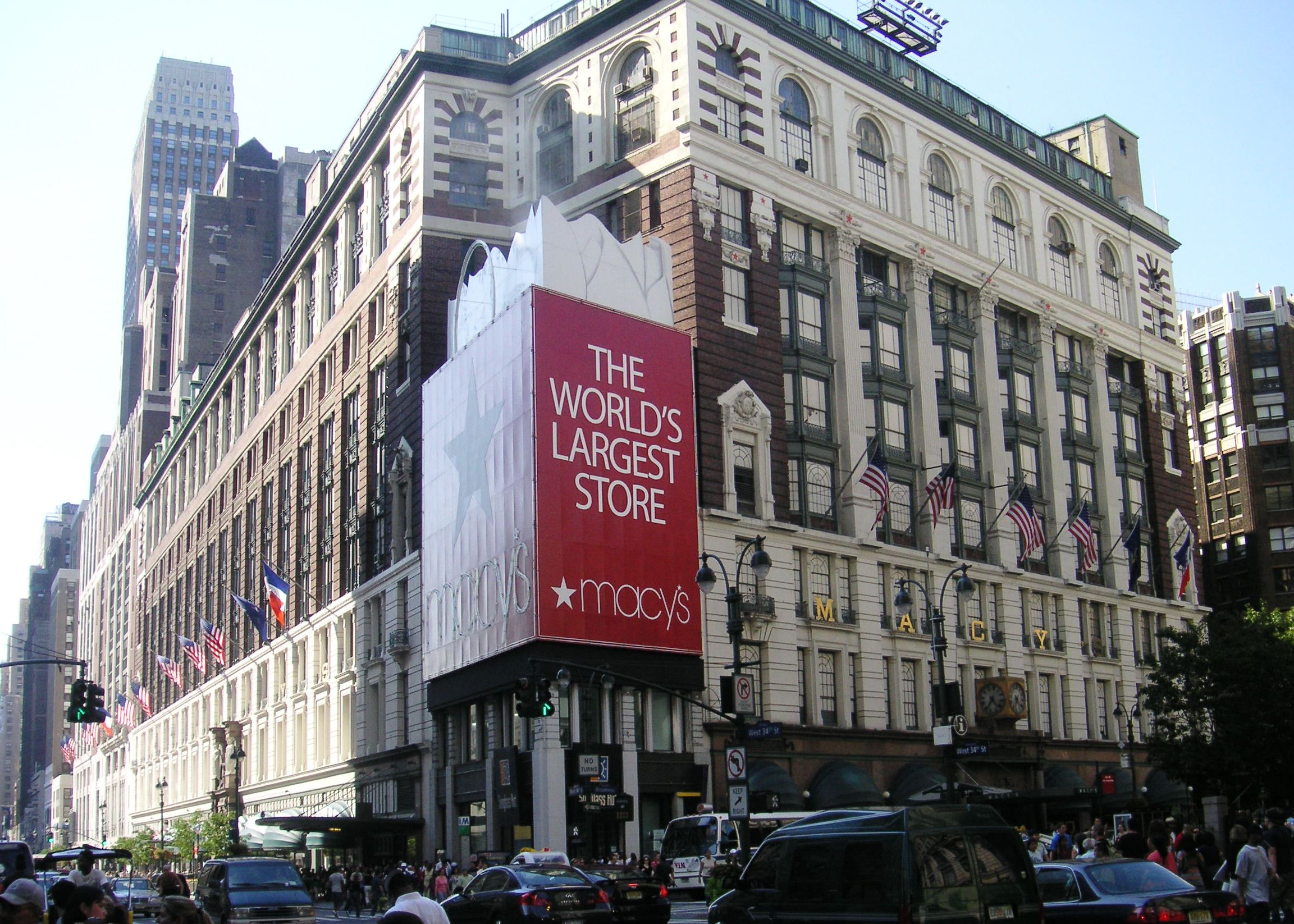
Between 7th Avenue and Broadway is Macy's, which advertises itself as the "world's largest department store."

The street was designated by the Commissioners' Plan of 1811 that established the Manhattan street grid as one of 15 east-west streets that would be 100 feet (30 m) in width (while other streets were designated as 60 feet (18 m) in width).

== Description ==
At the west end of the street one finds the Hudson River, the West Midtown Ferry Terminal, the West 30th Street Heliport, the Hudson River Greenway, the West Side Highway, and the Jacob K. Javits Convention Center, New York City's main convention center. On the West Side, 34th Street is in the Hell's Kitchen neighborhood, at the north end of the West Side Yard. Until 2017 the southwest corner at Tenth Avenue had McDonald's with a drive-thru and a small parking lot, a rarity in Manhattan. On Ninth is B&H Photo Video, a large retailer of photographic and electronic equipment.

Further east at Eighth and 33rd, the James Farley Post Office and Penn Station dominate on the south side of the street, serving Amtrak trains to destinations all over the United States and Canada, and Long Island Rail Road and New Jersey Transit trains to suburbs. Above Penn Station sits Madison Square Garden, which calls itself "the world's most famous arena". The grand stairs of the James Farley Post Office are built on the scale of the former Penn Station. The architecture of the post office gives a flavor of what the area was like in the height of the railroad era.

34th Street is a major shopping street. Though it endured a decline in the 1970s, it rebounded late in the 20th century with new stores and new energy. There is a large video board and light display at 34th Street and Seventh Avenue. The block between Seventh Avenue and Broadway is Macy's Herald Square, the famous department store immortalized in the Christmas movie Miracle on 34th Street and taglined as the "world's largest store". The annual Macy's Thanksgiving Day Parade ends on 34th Street. Branches of large chain stores also operate between 8th and 5th Avenues.

East of Herald Square, there are corporate office towers in the Kips Bay and Murray Hill neighborhoods. On Fifth Avenue, between 33rd Street and 34th Street, is the Empire State Building, the eighth tallest building in the city. It stands on a rare ledge of solid Manhattan schist and is a prominent part of the skyline.

At the far end one finds residential buildings in Kips Bay, the neighborhood and the eponymous bend in the East River where 34th Street ends. At the riverbank are the FDR Drive, the East River Greenway for bicycling to the south end of Manhattan, a small parking lot for New York University, the East 34th Street Ferry Landing (NY Waterway, SeaStreak), and the East 34th Street Heliport.

The New York Post listed one part of the street – the block of between Sixth and Seventh Avenues – as one of "the most dangerous blocks in the city" because police crime statistics for 2015 showed that 44 burglaries and 244 grand larcenies had been reported there, more property theft than for any other city block.

== Attractions ==
Places located along or within one block of 34th Street include (from west to east):

- Jacob K. Javits Convention Center
- Hudson Yards buildings
- Congregation Beth Israel West Side Jewish Center
- Manhattan Center
- Hammerstein Ballroom
- New Yorker Hotel
- One Penn Plaza
- New York City Pennsylvania Station
- Macy's Herald Square
- Mercy College (New York)
- Herald Square
- Empire State Building
- B. Altman and Company Building, housing the City University of New York Graduate Center
- Madison Belmont Building
- 4 Park Avenue
- 3 Park Avenue
- Sy Syms School of Business
- New York Estonian House
- St. Vartan Cathedral
- Rusk Institute of Rehabilitation Medicine of New York University Medical Center

== Public transportation ==
Pennsylvania Station is located on 33rd Street, one block south, between Seventh and Eighth Avenues.

=== Bus service and busway ===
New York City Bus's M34 runs west–east across 34th Street, with some eastbound trips before, and all after 10pm running south on Second Avenue to serve Waterside Plaza. Westbound buses head south on 11th Avenue to 33rd Street before looping around at the Javits Center. The M34A duplicates the M34, except all buses serve Waterside Plaza and westbound buses head north on 8th Avenue to serve the Port Authority Bus Terminal. Eastbound service begins at 9th Avenue. Both routes operate as Select Bus Service.

In April 2010, the New York City Department of Transportation proposed to add bus rapid transit along the 34th Street corridor. To create exclusive lanes for buses, the street would be converted to one-way westbound operation west of Sixth Avenue and one-way eastbound operation east of Fifth Avenue; a pedestrian plaza would be created between Fifth and Sixth avenues. The street was eventually kept in two-way operation. In 2025, the NYCDOT proposed converting the entire street from Third to Ninth Avenue into a busway (similar to 14th Street), with significant restrictions on private car traffic. The NYCDOT subsequently indicated that it would not implement the busway, but the New York City Council voted to create the busway in August 2025 as part of a rezoning of Midtown South. Work on the busway was halted that October after the Federal Highway Administration requested information on how the busway would impact commercial and emergency vehicles, citing that the street was part of the National Highway System.

=== Subway service ===
The following New York City Subway stations serve 34th Street:

- 34th Street–Hudson Yards (IRT Flushing Line); serving the 7 and <7> trains
- 34th Street–Penn Station (IND Eighth Avenue Line); serving the A, C, and E trains
- 34th Street–Penn Station (IRT Broadway–Seventh Avenue Line); serving the 1, 2, and 3 trains
- 34th Street Herald Square; serving the B, D, F, <F>, M, N, Q, R, and W trains
- 33rd Street (IRT Lexington Avenue Line); serving the 4, 6, and <6> trains

In addition, the following PATH station serves 34th Street:

- 33rd Street; serving the JSQ–33, JSQ–33 (via HOB), and HOB–33 trains

In the past, three of the four former IRT elevated lines had a station at 34th Street:

- 34th Street on the IRT Second Avenue Line
- 34th Street on the IRT Third Avenue Line
- 34th Street on the IRT Ninth Avenue Line

The fourth station was a spur over 34th Street from the Third Avenue Line to the East 34th Street Ferry Landing.

== See also ==
- Manhattan streets, 23-42
- Miracle on 34th Street
- Koreatown
- Kips Bay
