= 53rd Street station =

53rd Street station may refer to:

- 53rd Street (BMT Fourth Avenue Line), a local station on the BMT Fourth Avenue Line
- 53rd Street (IRT Third Avenue Line), a station on the demolished IRT Third Avenue Line
