= 34th Street station (IRT Third Avenue Line) =

Former Manhattan Railway elevated station (closed 1955)

34th St. / 3rd Ave.

General information
- Location: East 34th Street and 3rd Avenue; Lower Manhattan, Manhattan, New York
- Coordinates: 40°44′44.4″N 73°58′41″W
- System: Former Manhattan Railway elevated station
- Operator: Interborough Rapid Transit Company; City of New York (1940–1953); New York City Transit Authority
- Lines: Third Avenue Line; 34th Street Shuttle
- Platforms: 2 side platforms (main line); 1 island platform (shuttle)
- Tracks: 5 (3 – main line) (2 – shuttle)

Construction
- Structure type: Elevated

History
- Opened: August 26, 1878; 148 years ago
- Closed: May 12, 1955; 71 years ago

Former services
Preceding station	Interborough Rapid Transit	Following station
42nd Street toward 129th Street	Third Avenue Local	28th Street toward South Ferry
Terminus	34th Street Shuttle	Second Avenue toward 34th Street Ferry
Location

The 34th Street station was a local station on the demolished IRT Third Avenue Line in Manhattan, New York City. The station was served by Third Avenue local trains and a shuttle to the 34th Street Ferry. Third Ave service originally had two tracks and two side platforms. During the Dual Contracts, a center express track was built. The shuttle to the ferry was served by two tracks and an island platform attached to the northbound side platform. North of the station the westbound track of the shuttle merged with the main line.

== History ==
34th Street station was opened on August 26, 1878, by the New York Elevated Railway Company which ran the line as far north as Grand Central Depot, until the line was expanded to 67th Street on September 16, 1878. In 1879 the Manhattan Railway Company acquired this station as well as all south-to-north lines in Manhattan, and by July 1, 1880, they added a spur east along 34th Street to the 34th Street Ferry Terminal, which connected commuters to railroad station and ferry terminal in Long Island City. The next stop to the north was 42nd Street. The next stop to the south was 28th Street. Eastbound on the shuttle, the next stop was Second Avenue.

The shuttle platform was closed on July 14, 1930, five years after ferry service was ended by the Long Island Rail Road. This station closed entirely on May 12, 1955, with the ending of all service on the Third Avenue El south of 149th Street.
