= 23rd Street station (IRT Second Avenue Line) =

Former Manhattan Railway elevated station (closed 1942)

23rd St.

General information
- Location: East 23rd Street, between 2nd Avenue and 1st Avenue; Midtown Manhattan, Manhattan, New York
- Coordinates: 40°44′15″N 73°58′48″W
- System: Former Manhattan Railway elevated station
- Operator: Interborough Rapid Transit Company; City of New York (after 1940)
- Line: Second Avenue Line
- Platforms: 2 side platforms
- Tracks: 3 (2 – lower level) (1 – upper level)

Construction
- Structure type: Elevated

History
- Opened: March 1, 1880; 146 years ago
- Closed: June 13, 1942; 84 years ago

Former services
Preceding station	Interborough Rapid Transit	Following station
34th Street toward 129th Street	Second Avenue Local	19th Street toward South Ferry
Location

The 23rd Street station was a station on the demolished IRT Second Avenue Line in Manhattan, New York City. It had two levels. The lower level had two tracks and two side platforms and served local trains. The upper level had one track for express trains. The next stop to the north was 34th Street. The next stop to the south was 19th Street. The station closed on June 13, 1942. There is a proposed station with the same name on the phase 3 of the Second Avenue Subway.
