= 59th Street station (IRT Third Avenue Line) =

Former Manhattan Railway elevated station (closed 1955)

59th ST.
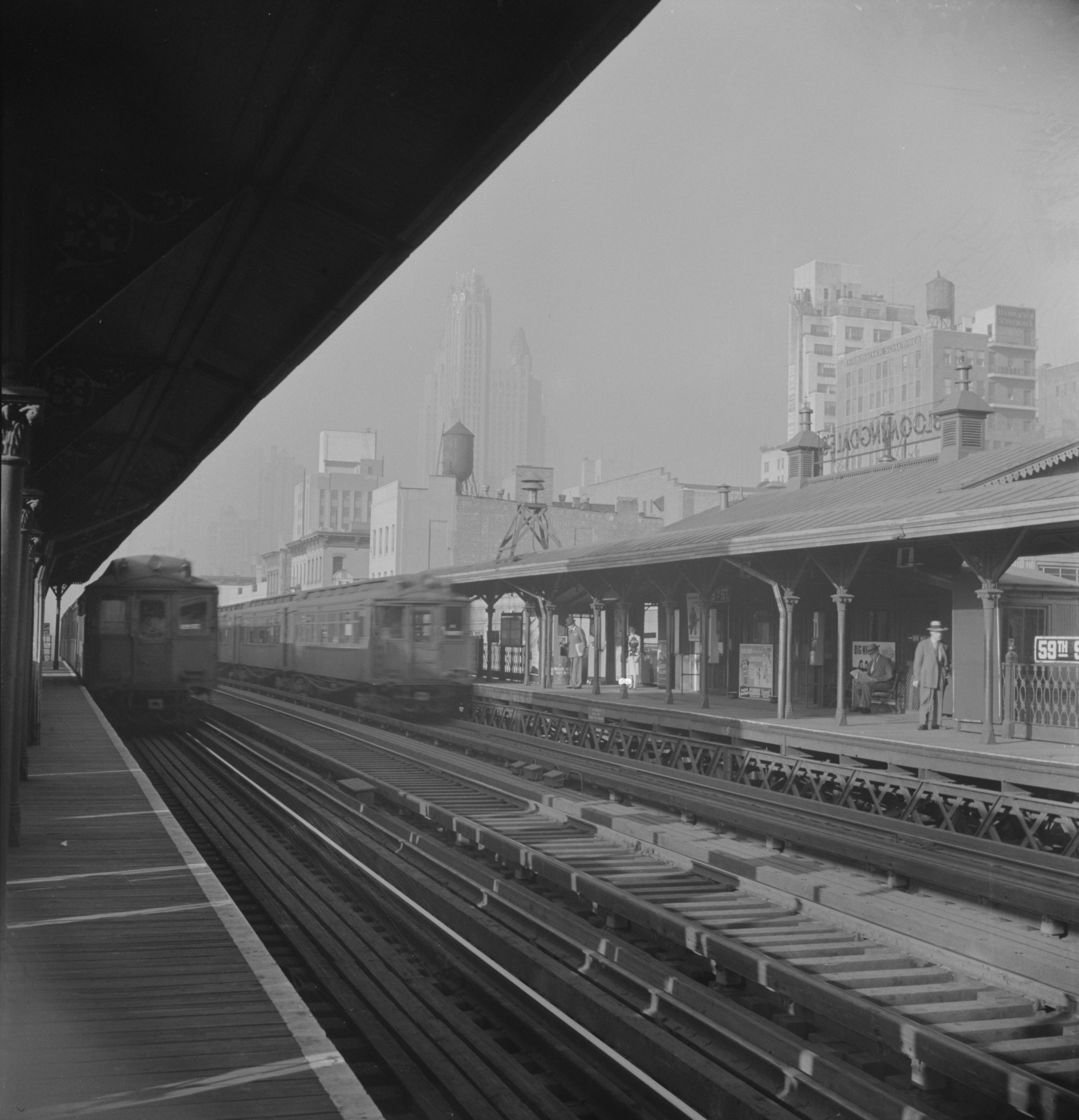
- Southbound View of 59th Street station

General information
- Location: East 59th Street and 3rd Avenue; Midtown Manhattan and Upper East Side, Manhattan, New York
- Coordinates: 40°45′41.4″N 73°57′59.6″W
- System: Former Manhattan Railway elevated station
- Operator: Interborough Rapid Transit Company; City of New York (1940–1953); New York City Transit Authority
- Line: Third Avenue Line
- Platforms: 2 side platforms
- Tracks: 3

Construction
- Structure type: Elevated

History
- Opened: September 16, 1878; 148 years ago
- Closed: May 12, 1955; 71 years ago

Former services
Preceding station	Interborough Rapid Transit	Following station
67th Street toward 129th Street	Third Avenue Local	53rd Street toward South Ferry
Location

The 59th Street station was a local station on the demolished IRT Third Avenue Line in Manhattan, New York City. It was built on September 16, 1878. The local trains used two tracks and two side platforms. The center track was built as part of the Dual Contracts and was used for express trains. Due to its location along the east side of the headquarters for Bloomingdale's, the station was also known as "Bloomingdale's Station." The station was also the first rapid transit stop in the city to have an escalator, installed in September 1901. This station closed on May 12, 1955, with the ending of all service on the Third Avenue El south of 149th Street.
