= 42nd Street station (IRT Third Avenue Line) =

Former Manhattan Railway elevated station (closed 1955)

42nd St.
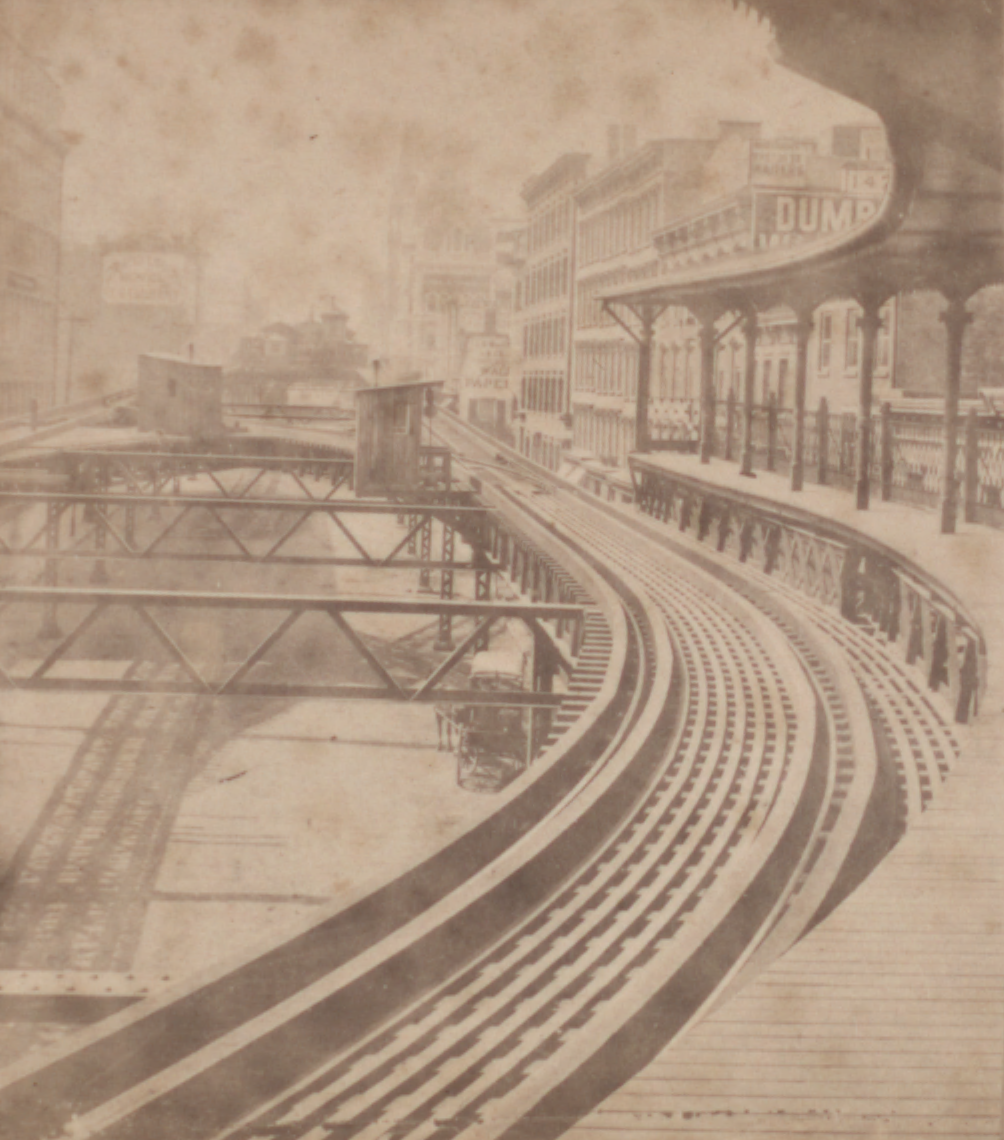
- The side platform in the 1880s or 1890s looking west toward Grand Central

General information
- Location: East 42nd Street and 3rd Avenue; Midtown Manhattan, Manhattan, New York
- Coordinates: 40°45′3″N 73°58′27.8″W
- System: Former Manhattan Railway elevated station
- Operator: Interborough Rapid Transit Company; City of New York (1940–1953); New York City Transit Authority
- Lines: Third Avenue Line; 42nd Street Branch
- Platforms: 2 side platforms (upper level express); 2 side platforms (lower level local); 1 side platform (shuttle)
- Tracks: 3 (lower level); 1 (upper level)

Construction
- Structure type: Elevated

History
- Opened: August 26, 1878; 148 years ago (shuttle); September 16, 1878; 148 years ago (67th Street Extension)
- Closed: December 23, 1923; 102 years ago (shuttle); May 12, 1955; 71 years ago

Former services
Preceding station	Interborough Rapid Transit	Following station
106th Street toward Bronx Park	Third Avenue Local-Express	23rd Street toward City Hall
47th Street toward 129th Street	Third Avenue Local	34th Street toward South Ferry
Grand Central Terminus	42nd Street Shuttle	Terminus
Location

The 42nd Street station was an elevated express station on the demolished IRT Third Avenue Line in Manhattan, New York City. It had two levels with the lower level (built first) having three tracks. The main line tracks were served by two side platforms. A side platform connected to the southbound platform was used for shuttle service to Grand Central. The upper level was built as part of the Dual Contracts, and had one track and two side platforms over the two local tracks.

== History ==
42nd Street station was built on August 26, 1878, by the New York Elevated Railway Company, and was the penultimate station on the Third Avenue El until it was expanded to 67th Street almost a month later. West of this station, the original line became the Grand Central Shuttle, serving Grand Central Depot until 1899, when it was replaced by Grand Central Station, which was itself replaced by Grand Central Terminal in 1913. From that point on, the next stop to the north was 47th Street for local trains and 106th Street for express trains. The next stop to the south was 34th Street for local trains and 23rd Street for express trains. The express run from this stop to 106th Street was the longest express segment out of all New York City elevated lines, bypassing eight local stations.

In 1904, Interborough Rapid Transit opened the Grand Central Subway station, which gained platforms for the IRT Flushing Line in 1915, and new platforms for the expanded IRT Lexington Avenue Line in 1918, the same year the original platforms at the station were converted for the 42nd Street Shuttle. By this time, the shuttle became obsolete and after the Grand Central El station was closed on December 6, 1923, the shuttle platform at 42nd Street was closed on December 23, 1923. When the IRT Second Avenue Line was closed on June 13, 1942, a free transfer for Third Avenue Line passengers was made available to and from the subway services at Grand Central–42nd Street to replace the direct service to lower Manhattan that was lost. The station closed entirely on May 12, 1955, with the ending of all service on the Third Avenue El south of 149th Street.
