= 47th Street station (IRT Third Avenue Line) =

Former Manhattan Railway elevated station (closed 1955)

47th ST.

General information
- Location: East 47th Street and 3rd Avenue; Midtown Manhattan, Manhattan, New York
- Coordinates: 40°45′14″N 73°58′19.7″W
- System: Former Manhattan Railway elevated station
- Operator: Interborough Rapid Transit Company; City of New York (1940–1953); New York City Transit Authority
- Line: Third Avenue Line
- Platforms: 2 side platforms
- Tracks: 3

Construction
- Structure type: Elevated

History
- Opened: September 16, 1878; 148 years ago
- Closed: May 12, 1955; 71 years ago

Former services
Preceding station	Interborough Rapid Transit	Following station
53rd Street toward 129th Street	Third Avenue Local	42nd Street toward South Ferry
Location

The 47th Street station was a local station on the demolished IRT Third Avenue Line in Manhattan, New York City. It was served by local trains by two tracks and two side platforms. The center track was built as part of the Dual Contracts and was used for express trains. This station closed on May 12, 1955, with the ending of all service on the Third Avenue El south of 149th Street.
