= Grand Central station (IRT 42nd Street Branch) =

Former Manhattan Railway elevated station (closed 1923)

Grand Central
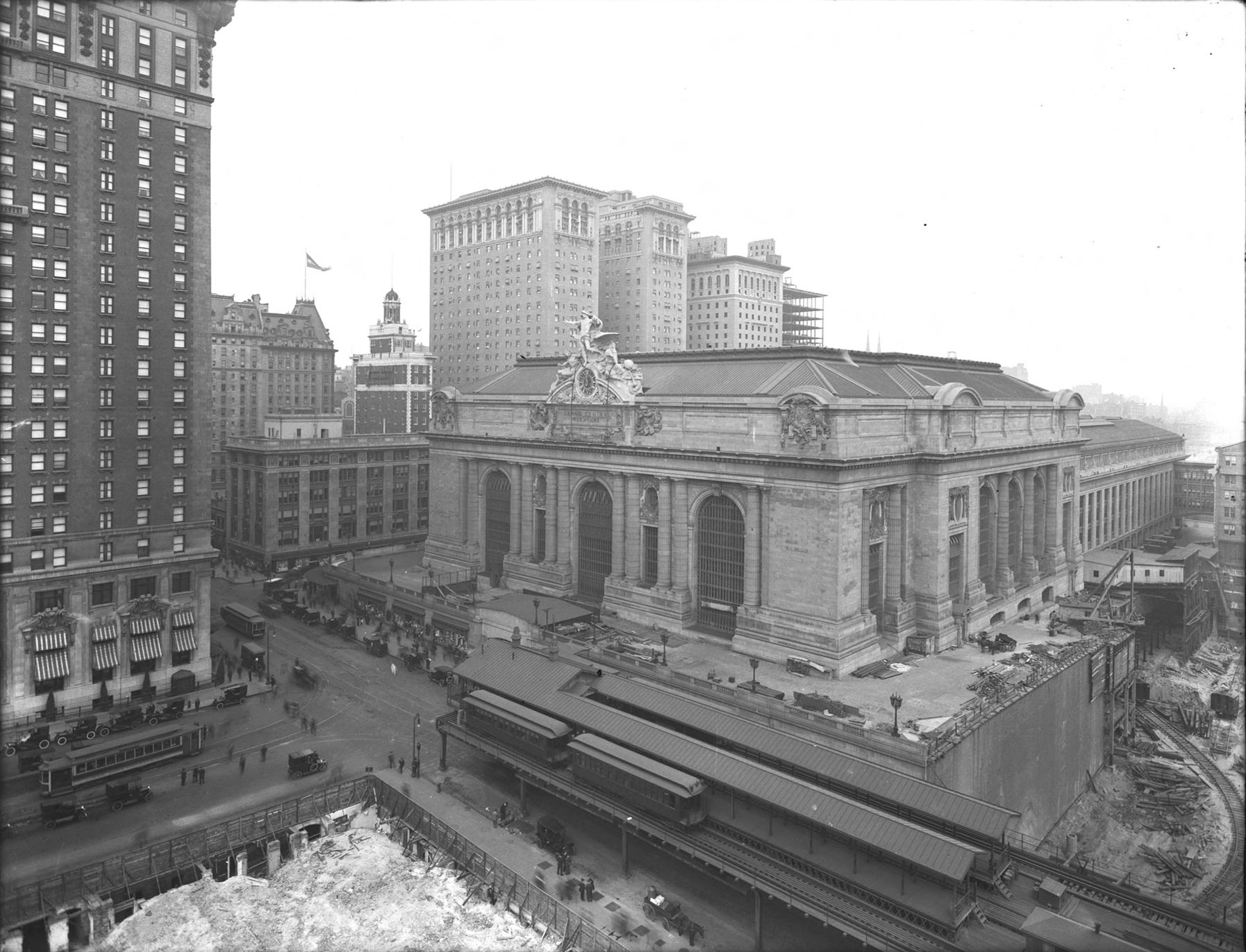
- 42nd St. elevated station (bottom right)

General information
- Location: East 42nd Street between Park Avenue and Lexington Avenue; Midtown Manhattan, New York City
- Coordinates: 40°45′6.88″N 73°58′37.89″W
- System: Former Manhattan Railway elevated station
- Operator: Interborough Rapid Transit Company
- Line: 42nd Street Branch
- Platforms: 2 side platforms 2 island platforms Spanish solution
- Tracks: 3

Construction
- Structure type: Elevated

History
- Opened: August 26, 1878; 148 years ago
- Closed: December 6, 1923; 102 years ago

Former services
Preceding station	Interborough Rapid Transit	Following station
Terminus	42nd Street Shuttle	42nd Street Terminus
Location

The Grand Central station was the terminal for some trains of the IRT Third Avenue Line, also known as the Third Avenue El, in Manhattan, New York City. This station originally had one island platform and two side platforms, all connected at the west end (later converted to three tracks and two island platforms). The tracks ended just east of the Park Avenue Viaduct ramp over Pershing Square.

It opened August 26, 1878, and served not only Grand Central Terminal but also its two predecessors, Grand Central Station (1899–1913) and Grand Central Depot (1871–1899). When the El opened north of 42nd Street in September 1878, this segment was reduced to a shuttle, which connected to the mainline at the 42nd Street station, at Third Avenue.

In 1904, the Interborough Rapid Transit Company opened the Grand Central station as part of its first subway line. Platforms for the IRT Flushing Line opened in 1915, followed by those for the IRT Lexington Avenue Line in 1918; after the Lexington Avenue Line platforms opened, the original platforms at the station were converted for use by the 42nd Street Shuttle. By this time, the El station had become obsolete and it was closed on December 6, 1923.
