= Grand Central–42nd Street station =

New York City Subway station in Manhattan

Grand Central–42 Street
- New York City Subway station complex
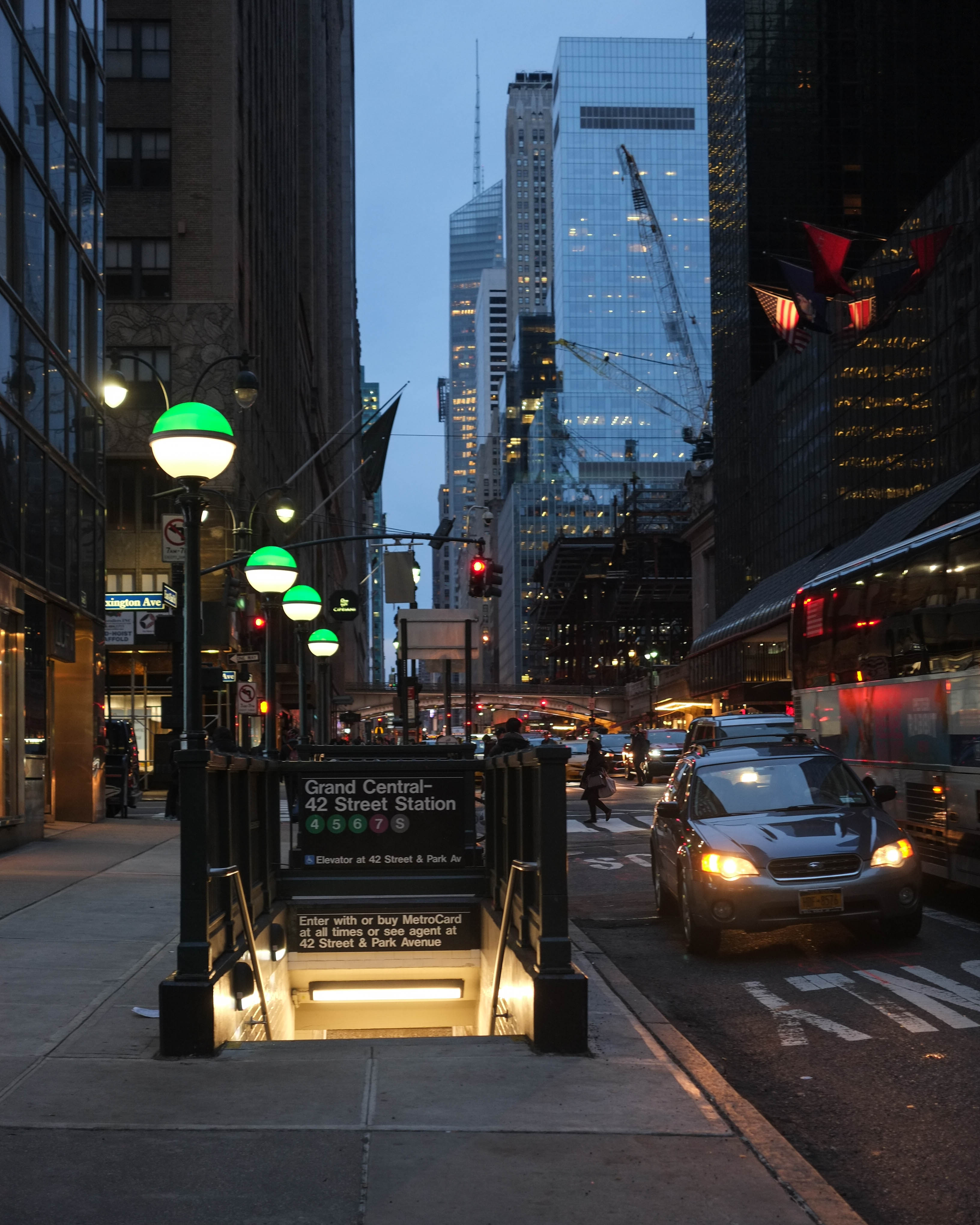
- The entrance to Grand Central–42nd Street at Lexington Avenue

Station statistics
- Address: East 42nd Street and Park Avenue; New York, New York
- Borough: Manhattan
- Locale: Midtown Manhattan
- Coordinates: 40°45′08″N 73°58′39″W
- Division: A (IRT)
- Line: IRT 42nd Street Shuttle; IRT Flushing Line; IRT Lexington Avenue Line
- Services: 4 (all times); 5 (all times except late nights); 6 (all times) <6> (weekdays until 8:45 p.m., peak direction); 7 (all times) <7> (rush hours until 9:30 p.m., peak direction); S (all except late nights)
- Transit: NYCT Bus: M1, M2, M3, M4, M42, M101, M102, M103, X27, X28, X37, X38, QM63, QM64, QM68, SIM4C, SIM6, SIM8, SIM11, SIM22, SIM23, SIM24, SIM25, SIM26, SIM30, SIM31, SIM33C; MTA Bus: Q32, BxM1, BxM3, BxM4, BxM6, BxM7, BxM8, BxM9, BxM10, BxM18, BM1, BM2, BM3, BM4, BM5, QM21, QM31, QM32, QM34, QM35, QM36, QM40, QM42, QM44; Metro-North Railroad: Harlem, Hudson, and New Haven Lines at Grand Central Terminal; Long Island Rail Road at Grand Central Madison
- Structure: Underground
- Levels: 3

Other information
- Opened: June 22, 1915; 111 years ago
- Accessible: Yes
- Former/other names: 42nd Street–Grand Central

Traffic
- 2025: 35,764,931 ▲7.4%
- Rank: 2 out of 423
Location
Location within New York City Subway
Location within New York City
Location within New York
Street map
Station service legend
Symbol	Description
Stops all times except late nights	Stops all times except late nights
Stops all times	Stops all times
Stops rush hours in the peak direction only	Stops rush hours in the peak direction only

The Grand Central–42nd Street station (also signed as 42nd Street–Grand Central) is a major station complex of the New York City Subway. Located in Midtown Manhattan at 42nd Street between Madison and Lexington Avenues, it serves trains on the IRT Lexington Avenue Line, the IRT Flushing Line and the 42nd Street Shuttle. The complex is served by the 4, 6, and 7 trains at all times; the 5 and 42nd Street Shuttle (S) trains at all times except late nights; the <6> train during weekdays in the peak direction; and the <7> train during rush hours and early evenings in the peak direction.

The station is adjacent to Grand Central Terminal and Grand Central Madison, which serves all Metro-North Railroad lines east of the Hudson River and Long Island Rail Road lines east bound for another major hub Jamaica and several points east. There are multiple exits to Grand Central Terminal and to nearby buildings such as One Vanderbilt and the Chrysler Building. Numerous elevators make the station compliant with the Americans with Disabilities Act of 1990.

The present shuttle station was constructed for the Interborough Rapid Transit Company (IRT) as an express station on the city's first subway line, which was approved in 1900. The station opened on October 27, 1904, as one of the original 28 stations of the New York City Subway. As part of the Dual Contracts, the Flushing Line platform opened in 1915. After the Lexington Avenue Line platforms opened in 1918, the original station became the eastern terminal of the 42nd Street Shuttle, reconfigured with three tracks and two platforms. The Grand Central–42nd Street station complex has been reconstructed numerous times over the years, including in the early 21st century, when the shuttle station was reconfigured.

Grand Central–42nd Street is the second busiest station in the 423-station system, with 45,745,700 passengers in 2019; only the Times Square–42nd Street and 42nd Street–Port Authority Bus Terminal station complex has more riders.

== History ==
=== First subway ===
Planning for a subway line in New York City dates to 1864. However, development of what would become the city's first subway line did not start until 1894, when the New York State Legislature passed the Rapid Transit Act. The subway plans were drawn up by a team of engineers led by William Barclay Parsons, the Rapid Transit Commission's chief engineer. It called for a subway line from New York City Hall in lower Manhattan to the Upper West Side, where two branches would lead north into the Bronx. A plan was formally adopted in 1897, which called for the subway to run under several streets in lower Manhattan before running under Fourth Avenue, 42nd Street, and Broadway. A previous proposal had called for the entire length of the subway to use Broadway, but the "awkward alignment...along Forty-Second Street", as the commission put it, was necessitated by objections to using the southernmost section of Broadway. All lawsuits concerning the route alignment were resolved near the end of 1899. The Rapid Transit Construction Company, organized by John B. McDonald and funded by August Belmont Jr., signed the initial Contract 1 with the Rapid Transit Commission in February 1900, in which it would construct the subway and maintain a 50-year operating lease from the opening of the line. In 1901, the firm of Heins & LaFarge was hired to design the underground stations. Belmont incorporated the Interborough Rapid Transit Company (IRT) in April 1902 to operate the subway.

The present shuttle station at Grand Central–42nd Street was constructed as part of the route segment underneath 42nd Street and Times Square, which extended from Park Avenue and 41st Street to Broadway and 47th Street. Construction on this section of the line began on February 25, 1901. Work for that section had been awarded to Degnon-McLean. By late 1903, the subway was nearly complete, but the IRT Powerhouse and the system's electrical substations were still under construction, delaying the system's opening. The Grand Central–42nd Street station opened on October 27, 1904, as one of the original 28 stations of the New York City Subway from City Hall to 145th Street on the Broadway–Seventh Avenue Line. The Grand Central shuttle platforms predate the terminal itself, as the construction of Grand Central Terminal was completed in 1913.

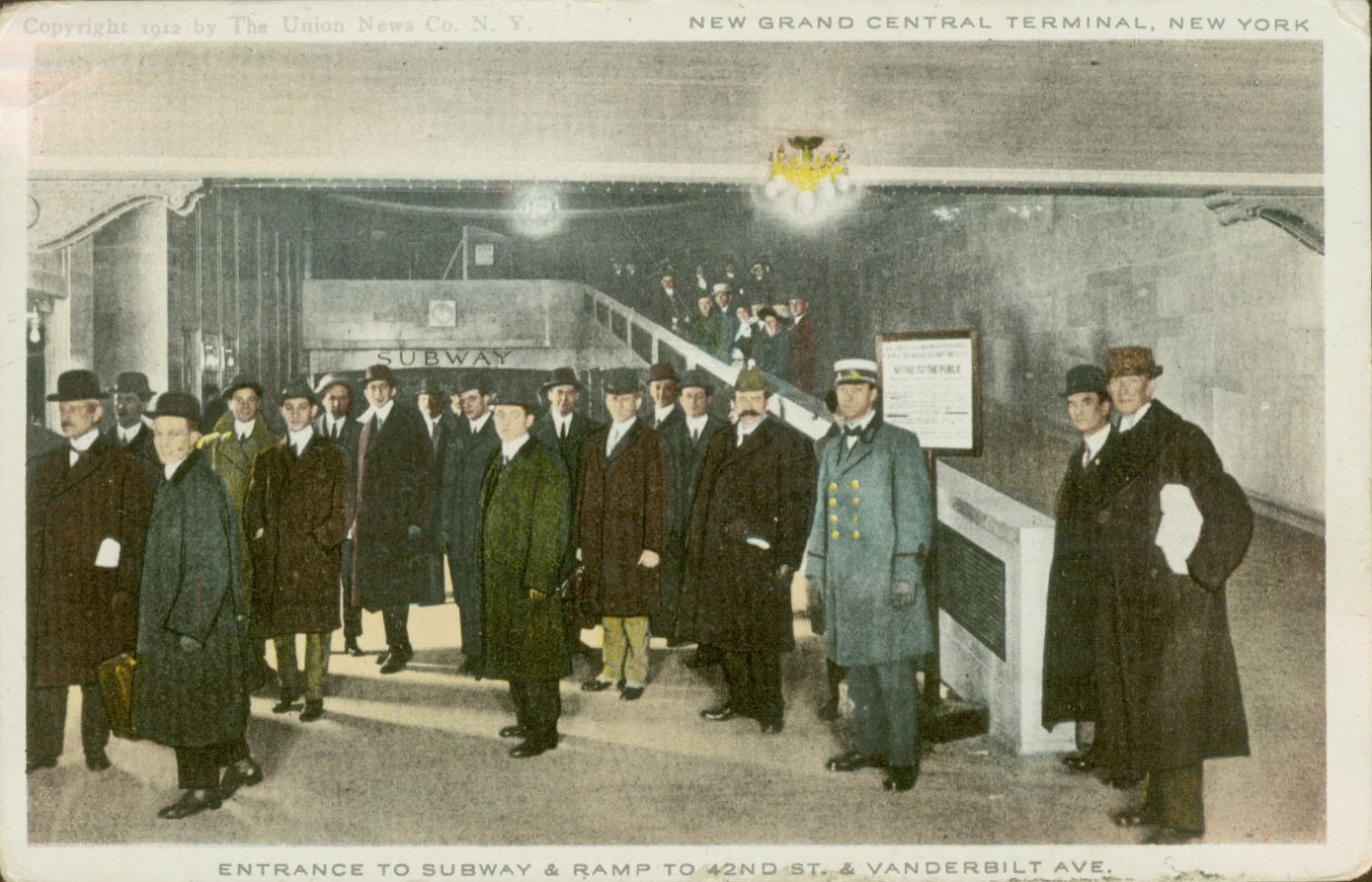
Entering the subway from the new Grand Central Terminal, 1912

After the first subway line was completed in 1908, the station was served by local and express trains along both the West Side (now the Broadway–Seventh Avenue Line to Van Cortlandt Park–242nd Street) and East Side (now the Lenox Avenue Line). West Side local trains had their southern terminus at City Hall during rush hours and South Ferry at other times, and had their northern terminus at 242nd Street. East Side local trains ran from City Hall to Lenox Avenue (145th Street). Express trains had their southern terminus at South Ferry or Atlantic Avenue and had their northern terminus at 242nd Street, Lenox Avenue (145th Street), or West Farms (180th Street). (Note: The next local station north was Times Square and the next express station north was 72nd Street. The next local and express stations south, respectively 33rd Street and 14th Street, were the same as on the present Lexington Avenue Line.)

To address overcrowding, in 1909, the New York Public Service Commission proposed lengthening the platforms at stations along the original IRT subway. As part of a modification to the IRT's construction contracts made on January 18, 1910, the company was to lengthen station platforms to accommodate ten-car express and six-car local trains. In addition to $1.5 million (equivalent to $51.8 million in 2025) spent on platform lengthening, $500,000 (equivalent to $17,277,000 in 2025) was spent on building additional entrances and exits. It was anticipated that these improvements would increase capacity by 25 percent. At the Grand Central station, the northbound platform was extended 135 feet (41 m) west, while the southbound platform was extended 125 feet (38 m) west. Small portions of the walls and roof were also reconstructed, and a new signal tower was constructed at the west end of the station. Six-car local trains began operating in October 1910. On January 23, 1911, ten-car express trains began running on the Lenox Avenue Line, and the next day, ten-car express trains were inaugurated on the West Side Line.

=== Early expansion ===
On May 17, 1910, the New York State Public Service Commission received a letter from the New York Central Railroad announcing plans to create a concourse to connect the under-construction Grand Central Terminal with new subway lines planned at 42nd Street. The plan called for the construction of a passageway under 42nd Street from the Vanderbilt Avenue end of the existing subway station to an elevator shaft at Lexington Avenue, connecting the planned Steinway Tunnel and Broadway–Lexington Avenue subway lines with street level. An elevator shaft would have connected the Steinway Tunnel, a platform with the Hudson & Manhattan Railroad (H&M, now PATH), and the new concourse, and would have led out to street level adjacent to a stairway leading to an extension of the IRT Third Avenue Line. As part of this proposal, the new station on the Broadway–Lexington Avenue Line would have been located at 42nd Street instead of 43rd Street to provide an adequate connection with Grand Central Terminal. The New York Central also recommended revising the planned location of the station on the Steinway tunnel line.

The original plan for what became the Lexington Avenue Line north of 42nd Street was to continue it south through Irving Place and into what is now the BMT Broadway Line at Ninth Street and Broadway. Contracts awarded on July 21, 1911, included Section 6 between 26th Street and 40th Street; at the time, the IRT had withdrawn from the talks, and the Brooklyn Rapid Transit Company (BRT) was to operate on Lexington Avenue. The IRT submitted an offer for what became its portion of the Dual Contracts on February 27, 1912. Soon after the IRT submitted its offer for the Dual Contracts, construction was halted on Section 6. The contracts were formalized in early 1913, specifying new lines or expansions to be built by the IRT and the BRT.

==== Steinway Tunnel ====
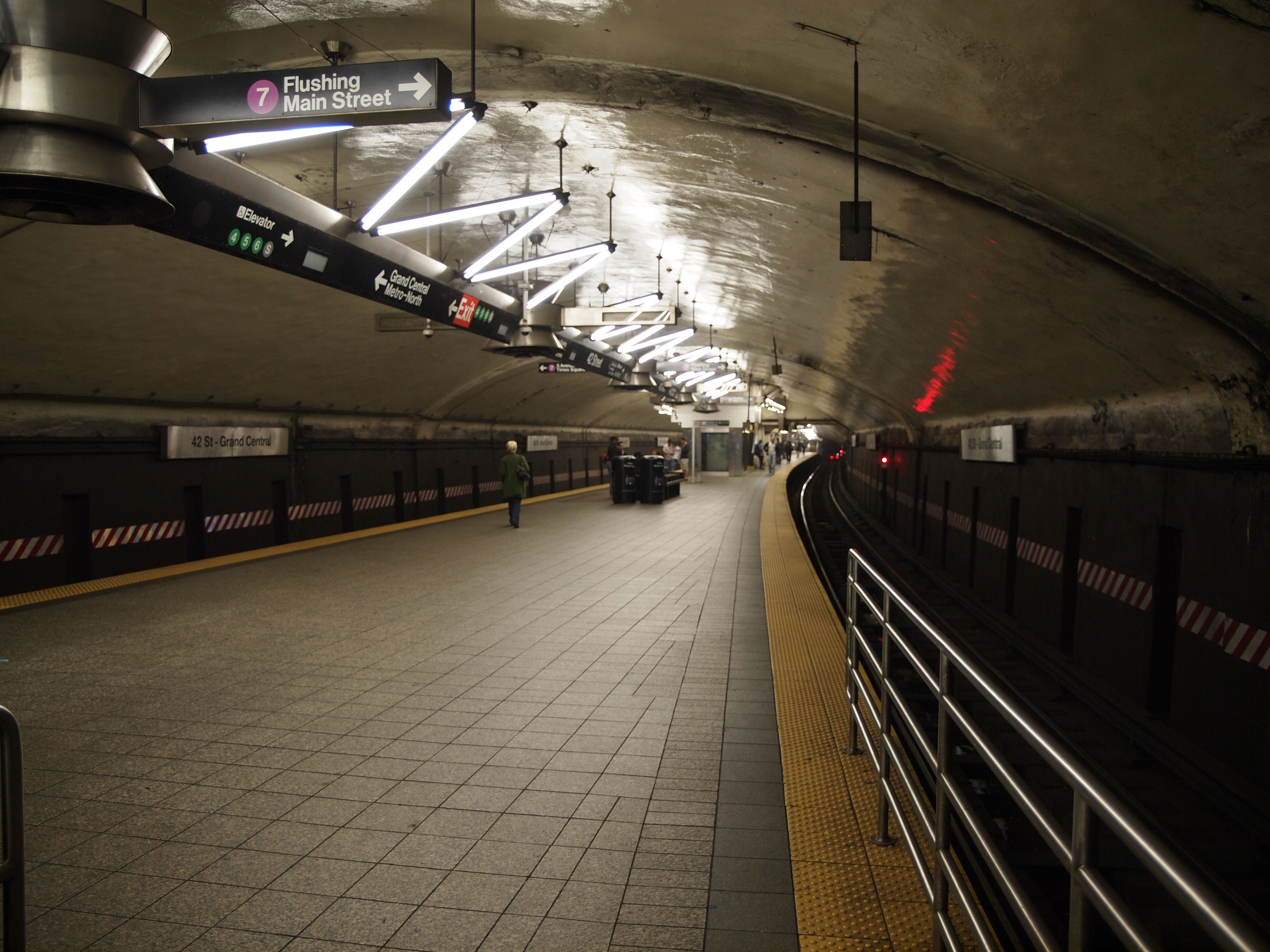
The Flushing Line platform opened in 1915 as part of the Dual Contracts.

The Dual Contracts involved opening the Steinway Tunnel as part of the new Flushing subway line. The route, traveling under 41st and 42nd Streets in Manhattan, was to go from Times Square through the tunnel over to Long Island City and from there continue toward Flushing. The tunnel, with trolley loops on both the Manhattan and Queens sides, had sat unused since 1907, when test runs had been performed in the then-nearly-complete tunnel. The Manhattan trolley loop was near the Grand Central station.

The Flushing Line platform was the first Dual Contracts improvement to be completed at Grand Central, opening on June 22, 1915. On August 31, 1916, a passageway connecting the Flushing Line platform with the rest of the subway station was opened with an inspection tour; it was opened to the public in the following days. The new passageway connected the station's eastern mezzanine with the Flushing Line platform via ramp and a pair of elevators. This was part of a ramp that the Public Service Commission had hoped to use to connect the Steinway Tunnel to the 42nd Street Line.

==== "H" system ====
Also as part of the Dual Contracts, the construction of the Lexington Avenue Line, in conjunction with the construction of the Broadway–Seventh Avenue Line, would change the operations of the IRT system. Instead of having trains go via Park Avenue, turning onto 42nd Street, before finally turning onto Broadway, there would be two trunk lines connected by the 42nd Street Shuttle. The system would be changed from looking like a "Z" system to an H-shaped system. One trunk would run via the new Lexington Avenue Line down Park Avenue, and the other trunk would run via the new Seventh Avenue Line up Broadway. It was predicted that the subway extension would lead to the growth of the Upper East Side and the Bronx. To reduce the 400-foot (120 m) transfer between the eastern end of the original line's station and the new Lexington Avenue Line station, a new shuttle station was to be built to the east. The construction of the narrow island platform station required building two new trackways extending east under 42nd Street. Although the platform was constructed, it was never used.

The Lexington Avenue Line was to run diagonally under the former Children's Hospital on the north side of 42nd Street east of Park Avenue. The route would connect the original subway under Park Avenue, on the west, to the new line under Lexington Avenue, on the east, at a point between 43rd and 44th Streets. This alignment also ran under the Grand Union Hotel at the southeast corner of 42nd Street and Park Avenue. The Public Service Commission had to acquire an easement from the New York Central Railroad, the owner of the Children's Hospital site, but the commission was unwilling to pay New York Central's asking price for the easement. Consequently, in April 1913, the plan was modified so that the line made an S-curve under 40th Street. The Public Service Commission voted on the modification in June 1913, and the modified route under 40th Street was adopted that November. The commission voted in favor of the original diagonal route in February 1914, at which point the Grand Union Hotel was condemned via eminent domain. The condemnation proceedings for the hotel cost $3.5 million (equivalent to $112,500,000 in 2025). The commission also acquired an easement from New York Central in February 1915 for $902,500 (equivalent to $28,722,656 in 2025). To pay for the station's construction cost, the Public Service Commission approved the construction of a 25-story building on the Grand Union Hotel site. The structure was not erected as proposed; it would later become the Pershing Square Building, which opened in 1923.

In 1912, in coordination with plans for the new station, a new passageway was planned to replace existing entrances at the corner of Vanderbilt Avenue and 42nd Street. There were plans to build a new entrance to the northwestern corner of this intersection into the United Cigar Stores Company building. In Fiscal Year 1913, work to connect the Grand Central subway station and Grand Central Terminal was authorized, as was the extension of the eastern mezzanine to connect with a building at the northwestern corner of Vanderbilt Avenue and 42nd Street. Work to build a new mezzanine at the western end of the station, and with new stairways, including an entrance to the building at the southwestern corner of Madison Avenue and 42nd Street was also authorized. In Fiscal Year 1915, the eastern mezzanine was extended to connect with a building at the northeastern corner of 42nd Street and Vanderbilt Avenue. In March 1916, the Public Service Commission authorized the IRT to build a new mezzanine passage at the station to reduce platform crowding for $6,000 (equivalent to $177,523 in 2025). As part of the project, a passageway would be constructed connecting the existing mezzanine immediately to the west of Vanderbilt Avenue on the north side of 42nd Street over the express tracks with the southbound platform with a new stairway approximately 64 feet (20 m) to the west of the existing eastern stairway.

The Lexington Avenue Line station opened on July 17, 1918, with service initially running between Grand Central–42nd Street and 167th Street via the line's local tracks. Service on the express tracks began two weeks later, on August 1, when the "H system" was put into place, with through service beginning on the new east and west side trunk lines, and the institution of the 42nd Street Shuttle along the old connection between the sides. The shuttle station was not ready in time, and therefore wooden flooring was temporarily laid over sections of the trackways at Times Square and Grand Central. The shuttle was heavily used, and the crowding conditions were so bad that the shuttle was ordered closed the next day. The shuttle reopened September 28, 1918. Track 2 at the Grand Central station was covered over by a wooden platform. A New York Times columnist later said that former southbound express track 2 was still usable for the first few hours of the shuttle's operation, but the wooden platform was placed over that track later the same day to allow shuttles to use former northbound express track 3, due to high demand for the shuttles on the former local tracks, numbered 1 and 4. The cost of the extension from Grand Central was $58 million (equivalent to $1.241482×10^{9} in 2025). The construction and opening of the Lexington Avenue Line north of Grand Central resulted in the construction of expensive apartments along Park Avenue, Madison Avenue, and Lexington Avenue.

==== Canceled Hudson & Manhattan Railroad platform ====
The H&M's Uptown Hudson Tubes had opened in 1908, stretching from New Jersey to 33rd Street and Sixth Avenue in Midtown Manhattan. Not long after the Uptown Hudson Tubes opened, there were proposals to extend the line to Grand Central. The H&M platforms would have been directly below the Broadway–Lexington Avenue Line's platforms, but above the Steinway Tunnel platforms. The concourse for the station would have been located on the north side of 42nd Street between Depew Place and Park Avenue, with stairways connecting to the Steinway Tunnel platform below. Two elevator shafts would have connected the Steinway Tunnel and the H&M platforms.

By 1909, the IRT had constructed an unauthorized ventilation shaft between the 42nd Street Shuttle and the Steinway Tunnel. This would force the H&M to build its station at a very low depth, thus making it harder for any passengers to access the H&M station. As an alternative, it was proposed to connect the Uptown Tubes to the Steinway Tunnel. A franchise to extend the Uptown Tubes to Grand Central was awarded in June 1909, with the expectation that construction could start within six months and that the new extension would be ready by January 1911. However, by 1914, the H&M had not started construction of the Grand Central extension yet, and it wished to delay the start of construction further.

By 1920, the H&M had submitted seventeen applications in which they sought to delay construction of the extensions; in all seventeen instances, the H&M had claimed that it was not an appropriate time to construct the tube. This time, the Rapid Transit Commissioners declined this request for a delay, effectively ending the H&M's right to build an extension to Grand Central.

=== 20th century modifications ===
==== 1920s to 1940s ====
In August 1925, Eastern Offices Inc. signed an agreement to lease land from the New York Central for 21 years to construct the Graybar Building. As part of the agreement, passageways were to be constructed to connect the building with Grand Central Terminal and the subway station. The connection to the subway station would run underneath the sidewalk adjacent to the Hotel Commodore. The new entrance was expected to reduce crowding at the existing northern entrances to the station through the Hotel Commodore at 42nd Street and 43rd Street.

In 1928, to alleviate overcrowding on the Lexington Avenue Line, a consulting engineer for the New York State Transit Commission proposed the construction of "reservoir" stations at 33rd/34th and 42nd Streets. The proposal entailed constructing a northbound-only tunnel under Lexington Avenue from 30th to 42nd Street, with stations at 34th and 42nd Streets, then converting the IRT tunnel under Park Avenue and the existing 33rd and 42nd Street stations to southbound-only use. The northbound and southbound stations at 33rd/34th and 42nd Streets would both have had two express tracks and one local track; the express tracks in either direction would have merged with each other north of 42nd Street and south of 30th Street. Joseph V. McKee wrote a letter to the IRT the next year, saying that overcrowding at the station during rush hours created life-threatening conditions. In response to McKee's complaint, the Transit Commission's chairman said the only ways to reduce overcrowding at the Grand Central–42nd Street station were to construct the "reservoir" stations or build a second subway line on Manhattan's east side. Although the "reservoir" plan was technically feasible, the projected cost of $35 to $40 million (the equivalent of $656,250,000 to $750,000,000 in 2024) was deemed too high.

In November 1929, the W. P. Chrysler Building Corporation reached an agreement with the Transit Commission to build an entrance from the subway station to the Chrysler Building between 42nd Street and 43rd Street. The IRT sued to block construction of the new entrance because it would cause crowding, but the New York City Board of Transportation pushed to allow the corridor anyway. Chrysler eventually built and paid for the building's subway entrance. Work on the new entrance started in March 1930, and it opened along with the Chrysler Building two months later. By then, the station had direct connections to 14 nearby buildings. As part of a pilot program, the IRT installed silencers on seven turnstiles at the station in April 1930; the Transit Commission authorized the IRT to install silencers on all of its turnstiles three months later.

The city government took over the IRT's operations on June 12, 1940. On February 12, 1946, work began to double the width of the passageway connecting the shuttle platforms and the main mezzanine over the Lexington Avenue Line platforms. As part of the work the wooden passenger walkway, which had an average width of 15 feet (4.6 m) was replaced by a 37 feet (11 m) wide passageway with concrete flooring. This walkway had been "temporary" when it was put into place in August 1918. The new 350 feet (110 m)-long passageway covered most of the trackways used by downtown trains of the Original Subway prior to 1918. The iron railings along the planked walkway were removed. The project cost $45,800 (equivalent to $756,169 in 2025) and was intended to ease congestion. As part of the project, the upper passageway was moved to within fare control to allow passengers to go between the subway mezzanine and the entrance to Grand Central Terminal at the shuttle without paying a fare. This was accomplished by moving the turnstiles at the eastern end of the passageway. In March, members of the Metallic Lathers Union Local 46 sought to halt construction on the project, which was over 80 percent complete, as the union objected to having the work done by city employees who made less than union workers. The rebuilt passageway opened on March 18, 1946. As part of a pilot program, the New York City Board of Transportation installed three-dimensional advertisements at the Grand Central station in late 1948.

==== 1950s to 1960s ====
On March 2, 1950, a new type of stainless steel portable newsstand was installed at the Flushing Line platform at Grand Central. The newsstand was owned by the Union News Company. On February 15, 1954, a new ramp and stairway passageway between the Lexington Avenue Line and Flushing Line platforms opened.

In April 1954, the Bowery Savings Bank completed the installation of a two-speed, reversible escalator from the ground floor of the building from the south side of 42nd Street between Pershing Square and Lexington Avenue to the station mezzanine. The construction of the escalator, which required digging into solid rock, cost about $135,000 (equivalent to $1,618,494 in 2025). The bank also installed teller windows into the mezzanine that would be open during rush hours, and installed slot machines in the wall where riders could exchange a quarter for a subway token and ten cents in change. Also in 1954, the New York City Transit Authority (NYCTA) installed fluorescent directional signs at the Grand Central–42nd Street station, the first station in the system to receive these illuminated signs.

On August 9, 1954, two new 4 foot (1.2 m)-wide escalators connecting the Flushing Line platform and the main mezzanine were placed into service. The NYCTA installed them for $1,235,000 (equivalent to $14,806,000 in 2025). The 40 foot (12 m) high escalators covered a distance of 78.833 feet (24.028 m) at a speed of 120 feet (37 m) per minute during rush hours, and at a speed of 90 feet (27 m) during other times, and could accommodate 20,000 people per hour. Both escalators traveled upwards in the morning rush hour on weekdays, and downward during the evening rush hour. During middays and weekends, the two escalators handled two-way traffic. The escalators were lit with fluorescent lighting, which would later be installed throughout the Grand Central station complex. The Flushing Line platforms at Grand Central, and all other stations on the Flushing Line with the exception of Queensboro Plaza, were extended in 1955–1956 to accommodate 11-car trains.

The New York City Transit Authority (NYCTA) submitted its $587 million (equivalent to $7.037454×10^{9} in 2025) 1955 to 1959 Capital Program to the New York City Board of Estimate on January 12, 1954. The third priority was an overall program to rehabilitate and modernize the Lexington Avenue Line for $52.7 million (equivalent to $631,812,000 in 2025). The most expensive element of the plan was the construction of a lower level station with multiple platforms and storage tracks, which was expected to cost $20 million (equivalent to $239,777,000 in 2025). The new tracks would be used by southbound trains in the morning rush hour and northbound trains in the evening rush hour. The lower level would be designed to allow trains to reverse direction around after rush hour and allow trains to be placed into service. This was intended to increase capacity in the station, reduce the impact of delays to service, and help relieve passenger congestion at the station, which was expected to increase with the demolition of the Third Avenue Elevated, increased ridership on the Flushing Line, and additional office construction near the station.

On March 10, 1955, the New York City Transit Authority (NYCTA) awarded a $1.6 million (equivalent to $19,230,000 in 2025) engineering contract for design, inspection, and field supervision for the project to Parsons, Brinckerhoff, Hall and MacDonald. Engineering work was expected to begin within six weeks. This project was expected to be completed in 40 months after the start of work. On November 28, 1955, in an attempt to reduce congestion between the Flushing Line platform and the mezzanine, the NYCTA made the three elevators at the western end of the Flushing Line platform to the mezzanine up-only between 5 p.m. and 6 p.m. on weekdays.

The NYCTA announced plans in 1956 to add fluorescent lights to the Flushing Line and shuttle platforms at the Grand Central station. In late 1959, contracts were awarded to extend the platforms at Bowling Green, Wall Street, Fulton Street, Canal Street, Spring Street, Bleecker Street, Astor Place, Grand Central, 86th Street and 125th Street to 525 feet (160 m) to accommodate ten-car trains. In August 1960, the Board of Estimate approved a $1,361,400 (equivalent to $14,816,000 in 2025) contract to extend platforms at 138th Street-Grand Concourse, 149th Street-Grand Concourse, 125th Street, 86th Street, and Grand Central. The platforms at all these stations other than the lower-level platforms at 149th Street were 480 feet (150 m) long.

On March 17, 1964, construction began on a $1 million (equivalent to $10,381,000 in 2025) project to replace three elevators serving the Flushing Line platform with two sets of 4 foot (1.2 m)-wide escalators, on two levels leading to the station mezzanine. The project was estimated to be completed in 22 months, and work began on March 17, with the removal of one of the elevators from service. Following the completion of the first set of escalators in fourteen months, the other two elevators would go out of service. This project was completed on April 3, 1966, with the completion of an escalator that traveled 50 foot (15 m) and had a capacity of 18,600 people an hour.

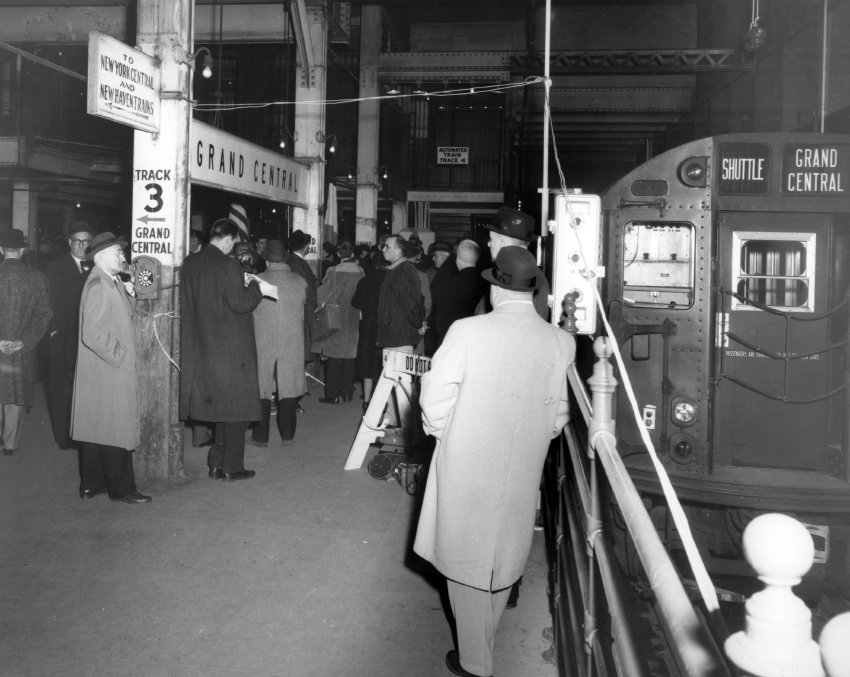
A view of the shuttle platform between Track 3 and 4, with the automatic train on the right in 1962

The shuttle station suffered a severe fire on April 21, 1964, which destroyed the automated train being tested in the 42nd Street Shuttle at the time. The fire began under a shuttle train on track 3, and it became larger, feeding on the wooden platform. The basements of nearby buildings were damaged. Tracks 1 and 4 returned to service on April 23, 1964, while Track 3 returned to service on June 1, 1964. The reinstallation of Track 3 was delayed because of the need to replace 60 beams that were damaged in the fire. From September 19, 1966, to April 1967, service on the shuttle was limited in order to allow for the reconstruction of parts of the line. The entire project cost $419,000 (equivalent to $4,158,000 in 2025), and included the construction of a new mezzanine at Grand Central. As part of the project, the tiles damaged by the smoke from the fire were replaced with tiles in the city's colors of blue, white and orange, with black tiles interspersed. In addition, fluorescent lighting, which was 12 times brighter than the old lighting, was installed. Track 2 between the shuttle station and Times Square–42nd Street was removed in 1975.

==== 1970s to 1990s ====
The NYCTA announced plans on November 24, 1977, to improve and install new escalators across the subway system, including six new escalators, the reconditioning of three escalators, and the modification of 22 escalators to have automatic treadle operation, which would reduce energy and maintenance costs as they would be activated by a passenger stepping on a rubber platform instead of running continuously. As part of the plan, two escalators at the Third Avenue entrance to the Flushing Line platform would be reconditioned.

On August 9, 1979, it was announced that New York City would receive $32 million (equivalent to $141,953,000 in 2025) from the Urban Mass Transit Administration's Urban Initiatives Projects grant program to renovation the Grand Central, Herald Square, and 42nd Street–Port Authority Bus Terminal subway stations. The remainder of the $40 million (equivalent to $177,442,000 in 2025) cost of renovating these stations would be covered by state and private sector matching funds. This program was set up by the Carter administration to use public funding to spur private-sector investments to rebuild cities. The Grand Central project, was expected to cost $12.5 million (equivalent to $55,450,000 in 2025), of which the Federal government would provide $10 million (equivalent to $44,360,000 in 2025), the state would provide $1 million (equivalent to $4,436,000 in 2025), and private developers would pay $1.5 million (equivalent to $6,654,000 in 2025) through a tax abatement plan. It qualified for the program due to a significant investment in the area by private developers, including the rebuilding of the Commodore Hotel as the Grand Hyatt, the renovation of the Chrysler Building, and the construction of a new headquarters for Philip Morris. Work on the renovation project was estimated to take three years, and would include the installation of escalators and elevators. Passageways would be straightened, widened, and relocated, fare controls be relocated, mezzanine areas would be expanded, signage, lighting and entrances would be improved, and the station's public address system would be upgraded.

On October 26, 1981, the Metropolitan Transportation Authority (MTA) held a public hearing over the agency's planned use of eminent domain to acquire 3,600 square feet (330 m^{2}) of the basement of the Grand Hyatt to construct a passageway to connect the station's northern and main mezzanines as part of the station renovation. In addition, as part of the project, a steep stairway to the Commodore passageway was to be reconstructed, and some stairways were to be relocated to reduce congestion. The construction of the passageway was intended to allow all stairways from the Lexington Avenue platforms to be used to access the 42nd Street Shuttle and Flushing Line platforms, and to improve passenger circulation. Elevators were installed to connect the main mezzanine and the two Lexington Avenue Line platforms, as was required to receive Federal funding.

In 1985, work began on a $23 million (equivalent to $68,851,000 in 2025) renovation of the Lexington Avenue Line station. As part of the project, new ceilings, floors, lighting, architectural graphics, entrances, and two escalators were installed.

In a report published in 1991, the New York City Department of City Planning recommended closing the Graybar subway passage because of its low usage and its proximity to other connections. After a woman was raped in another subway passageway, the Graybar subway passage and 14 others were closed by emergency order of the New York City Transit Authority on March 29, 1991, with a public hearing being held afterward. From January 1, 1990, to its closure, there had been 365 felonies committed in the Graybar subway passage, making it the most dangerous of the 15 passageways ordered closed. The passageway had been located behind a token booth, making it hard to patrol; at the time of its closure, the hallway was described as being "deceptively long and treacherous".

Work began on a five-year $82 million (equivalent to $173,258,000 in 2025) project to renovate the station in November 1995. The project, which was financed using state and Federal funds and designed by Gruzen Samton Architects, would focus on improving the appearance of the station, and would be constructed in phases. The renovation would restore the 1914 mosaic tiles on the walls of the Lexington Avenue Line platforms, cover existing columns with tile with new mosaics, create a v-shaped light installation on the vaulted ceiling of the Flushing Line platform, and install a contemporary mosaic frieze in multiple colors along the walls of the Shuttle platform. In addition, the stained concrete floors in the station complex would be replaced with pre-cast quartz terrazzo tiles, which would have the same color beige as the marble floors in Grand Central Terminal.

Under a 1990s plan for the Second Avenue Subway, a spur to Grand Central Terminal was considered, which would have turned off Second Avenue at 44th Street as a way to divert riders from the 4 and 5 routes, which run express on the Lexington Avenue Line. Service on this spur could not be as frequent as that on Lexington Avenue as there would not be enough capacity on Second Avenue, and as a result this plan was dropped.

=== 21st century ===
==== Renovations ====
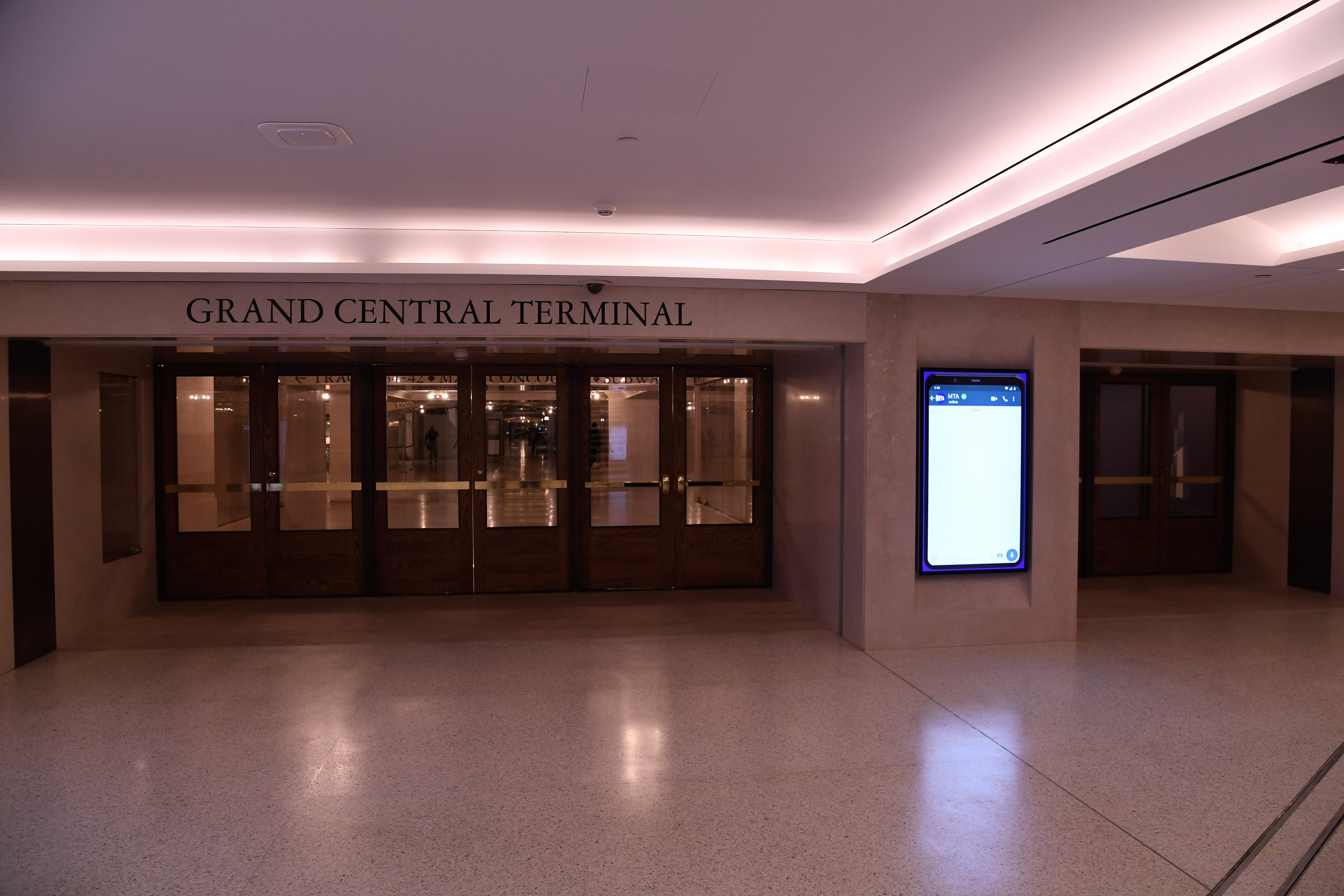
One Vanderbilt subway entrance

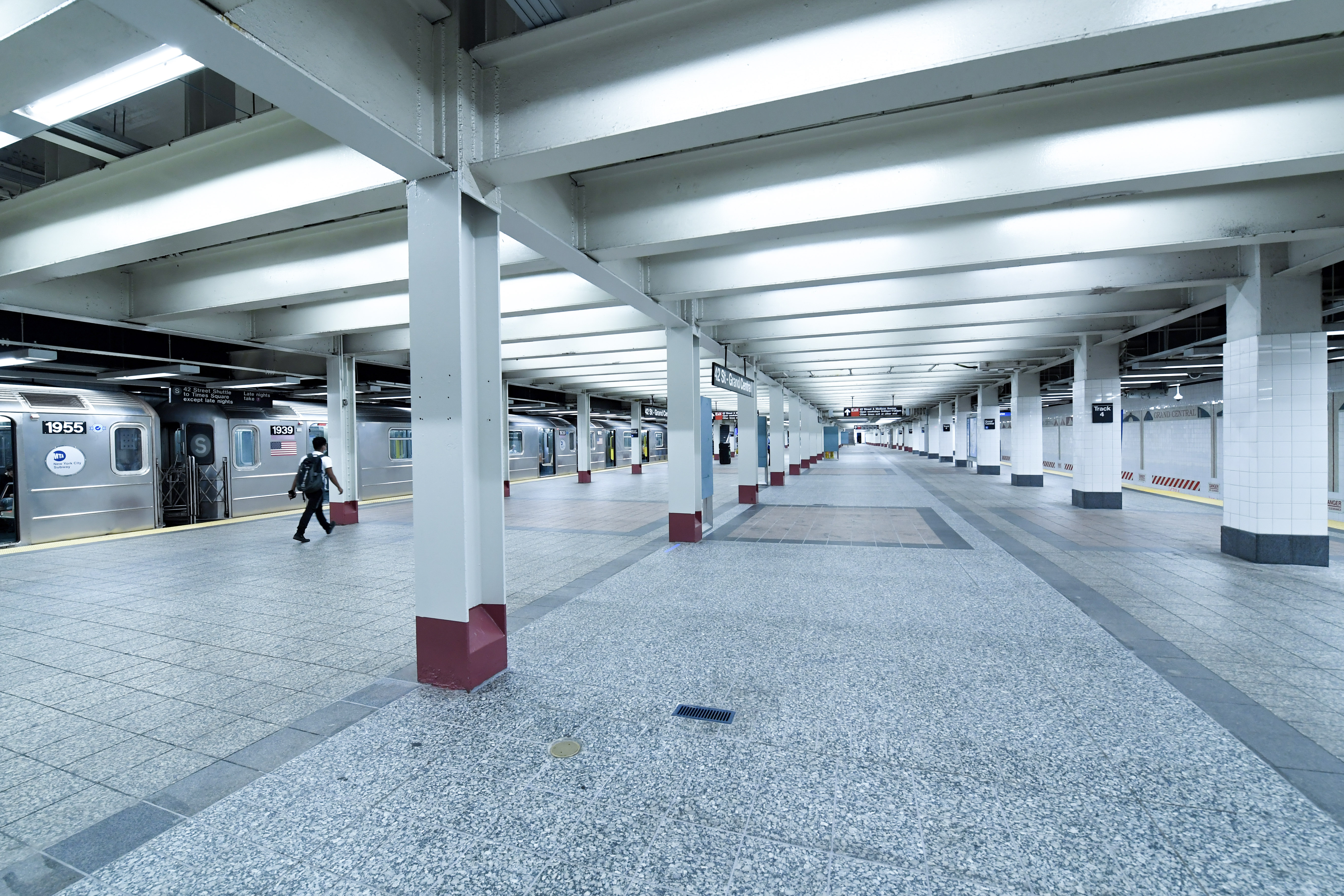
Widened platform as part of the 42nd Street Shuttle reconstruction project

As part of the construction of One Vanderbilt at the corner of Vanderbilt Avenue and 42nd Street, developer SL Green Realty made several upgrades to the station. The improvements entailed multiple new entrances and exits, including two staircases to the southeast corner of Lexington Avenue and 42nd Street, as well as an underground entrance directly from One Vanderbilt to the 42nd Street Shuttle platforms. Three new staircases from the mezzanine to the southbound Lexington Avenue Line platform, and one new staircase to the northbound platform, were added. The project also involved reconfiguration of columns supporting the nearby Grand Hyatt New York hotel at the southeast corner of the station, destruction of 40% of the Hyatt's basement to expand the subway mezzanine, and the thinning of columns on platforms and mezzanines to increase space. A new elevator was added within the existing Hyatt entrance, and the existing staircase was replaced. This would directly result in additional capacity for the station, since 4,000 to 6,000 more subway passengers per hour would be able to use it. These improvements would cost over $200 million (equivalent to $271,999,000 in 2025). The MTA mandated the station improvements in exchange for allowing the tower's construction. In 2015, SL Green gave $220 million (equivalent to $298,821,000 in 2025) toward the building's construction, of which two-thirds of the money would be used for station redesign; this marked the largest private investment to date to the New York City Subway system. The subway entrance in One Vanderbilt, as well as some of the other station upgrades, were completed in 2020.

As part of the 2015–2019 MTA Capital Program, the 42nd Street Shuttle became ADA accessible, the center track was removed, and the trains became six cars long. Although the Grand Central shuttle platforms were served by elevators, the shuttle as a whole was inaccessible because the platforms at Times Square were not accessible. The whole project will cost $235.41 million (equivalent to $315,806,000 in 2025), while the cost of this part of the project is $30 million (equivalent to $40,748,000 in 2025). At Grand Central, the center track, track 3, was removed and the two existing platforms were connected, providing one wide island platform with an area of 22,000 square feet (2,000 m^{2}). This became the largest platform in the subway system. The existing platforms were extended further west to accommodate six-car trains, using existing employee facility rooms. New consolidated employee facility rooms were constructed at the location of the switch connecting tracks 1 and 3. The P-4 staircase at the western end of the station leading to Madison Avenue from the existing northern platform was removed and the P-3 staircase leading there from the existing southern platform was considerably widened. By December 2016, the project was delayed, with construction set to start in December 2019 and be completed by September 2022. A construction contract was awarded on March 7, 2019, with an estimated completion date of March 2022. The new platforms were opened on September 7, 2021.

A new mezzanine below the existing mezzanine, known as the Short Loop connection, has been proposed to provide a direct connection from the subway station to the Grand Central Terminal's lower-level Metro-North platforms, and to the concourse of the Long Island Rail Road's Grand Central Madison station, the latter of which was built as part of the East Side Access project. This will replace the current escalators from the existing mezzanine directly to the Flushing Line platforms, and is estimated to cost $75–150 million (equivalent to $105,178,000 to $210,357,000 in 2025). The connection to the LIRR station opened on January 25, 2023. Further circulation improvements are planned as part of a replacement of the Hyatt with a skyscraper at 175 Park Avenue, to be called Project Commodore, which is expected to be built from 2022 to 2030. As part of the project, the subway turnstiles in the basement of the Hyatt would be moved to the ground floor of Project Commodore. The 42nd Street Passage from the street to Grand Central's Main Concourse, within the Hyatt's ground level, would be expanded by 5,400 square feet (500 m^{2}).

The escalators at the Third Avenue entrance to the Flushing Line platform were replaced during much of 2023. In February 2024, workers began constructing a transfer passageway between the Flushing and Lexington Avenue lines. This passageway opened in February 2025 as part of a $75 million upgrade. That April, an artwork by the artist collective Hilma's Ghost was installed at the Flushing Line platform's Third Avenue entrance. The MTA announced in 2025 that a customer service center would open at the station. The station-wide renovation was completed that October at a cost of $700 million; the work had included new or replaced turnstiles, elevators, escalators, and staircases, along with enlarged mezzanine areas.

==== Future subway connection ====
As part of the construction of the Second Avenue Subway, a transfer might be included between here and the 42nd Street station on that line. This would provide a transfer to the T train if Phase 3 of the Second Avenue Subway is built. The transfer was evaluated as part of the Second Avenue Subway's environmental impact statement published in 2004. The 900-foot-long (270 m) transfer passageway would run under 42nd Street between Second Avenue and Third Avenue, connecting to the IRT Flushing Line platform. Up to four properties might need to be required for the necessary ancillaries and emergency exits to be built. The passageway would run under the northern side of 42nd Street, and the exit at the eastern end would be on the northwestern corner of that street and Second Avenue.

==== Failed terrorist plot ====
Najibullah Zazi and alleged co-conspirators were arrested in September 2009 as part of an al-Qaeda Islamist plan to engage in suicide bombings on trains in the New York City Subway system, including near the Grand Central station and the Times Square–42nd Street station during rush hour that month. Zazi pled guilty.

== Station layout ==
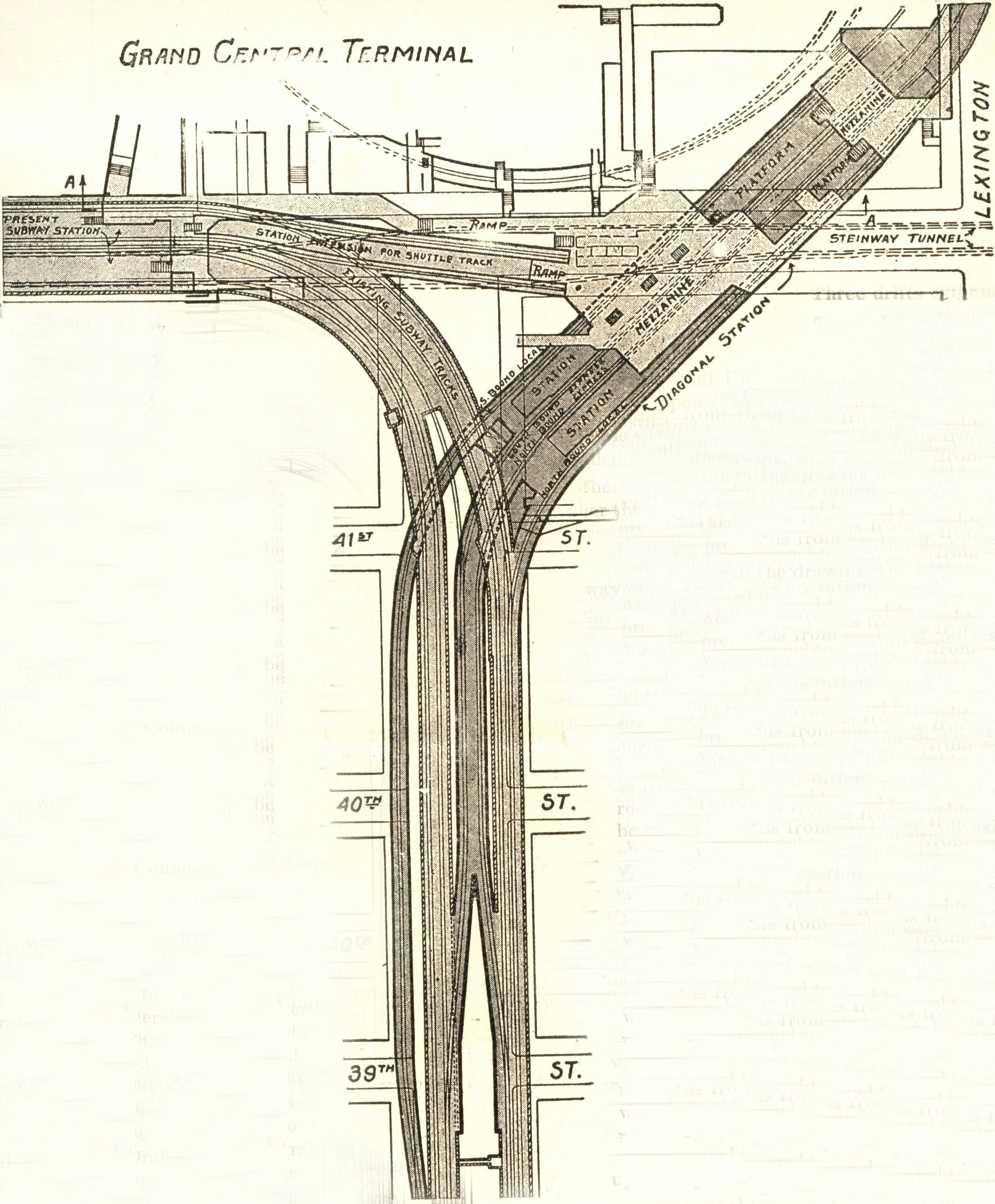
1918 plan

There is a mezzanine above the Lexington Avenue Line's platforms, which have numerous exits to and from Grand Central itself as well as to the streets (see § Exits). Escalators connect this mezzanine to the Flushing Line, although there are also staircases and passageways directly between the Lexington Avenue and Flushing Lines' platforms. The Flushing Line platform also has its own exit at its extreme eastern end, though all other exits are through the Lexington Avenue Line platforms and mezzanine. Outside the Lexington Avenue Line mezzanine's fare control, there are stairs, escalators, and an elevator to Grand Central. An east-west passageway connects the Lexington Avenue Line's mezzanine to the 42nd Street Shuttle, which also has its own dedicated entrance and exit stairs. The whole station is handicapped accessible, as is the connection to Grand Central Terminal.

In 2000, the Lexington Avenue Line station received air conditioning after Metro-North Railroad installed chillers for Grand Central Terminal. The chillers cost $17 million (equivalent to $31,783,000 in 2025) to install and are capable of cooling up to 3,000 tons of air. The Lexington Avenue Line station is one of a very small number of artificially cooled stations in the New York City Subway. The Flushing Line platforms have been equipped with fans, but not an air-cooling system.

In 2014, the Metropolitan Transportation Authority installed an online, interactive touchscreen computer program called "On The Go! Travel Station" (OTG) in Grand Central. The self-updating kiosks allow people to route their trips and check for delays. The MTA set up the map as part of a pilot project in five subway stations. It lists any planned work or service changes, as well as information to help travelers find nearby landmarks and addresses.

=== Exits ===
The station has numerous exits into Grand Central Terminal, to the street level, and inside several buildings along 42nd Street and Park Avenue. The station had more entrances inside buildings than any other IRT station, with 14 such entrances in 1930. Present-day exits include:

- One Vanderbilt, north side of 42nd Street between Madison Avenue and Vanderbilt Avenue
- The Chrysler Building through a passage immediately to the left of the customer service booth on the station's mezzanine
- The Pershing Square Building, 125 Park Avenue
- 110 East 42nd Street through a passage downtown of the main mezzanine through their own fare control
- The Chanin Building, 122 East 42nd Street, through its own turnstiles directly accessing the escalators to the IRT Flushing Line platform (east of the mezzanine)
- Grand Hyatt New York, west side of Lexington Avenue north of 42nd Street
- Socony-Mobil Building, south side of 42nd Street west of 3rd Avenue
- Grand Central Terminal's exits, by walking through exits uptown and to the west into the terminal

Exits directly to the street include:

- One stair on either side of 42nd Street between Madison and 5th Avenues
- One stair/escalator, SW corner of Park Avenue and 42nd Street
- Two stairs, SW corner of Lexington Avenue and 42nd Street

=== Relative depths ===
- Metro-North Railroad upper level, 20 feet (6.1 m) below street
- 42nd Street Shuttle, 20 feet (6.1 m)
- Lexington Avenue Line, 50 feet (15 m)
- Metro-North Railroad lower level, 60 feet (18 m)
- Flushing Line, 80 feet (24 m)
- Long Island Rail Road upper level, 130 feet (40 m)
- Long Island Rail Road lower level, 150 feet (46 m)

== IRT 42nd Street Shuttle platform ==
Grand Central
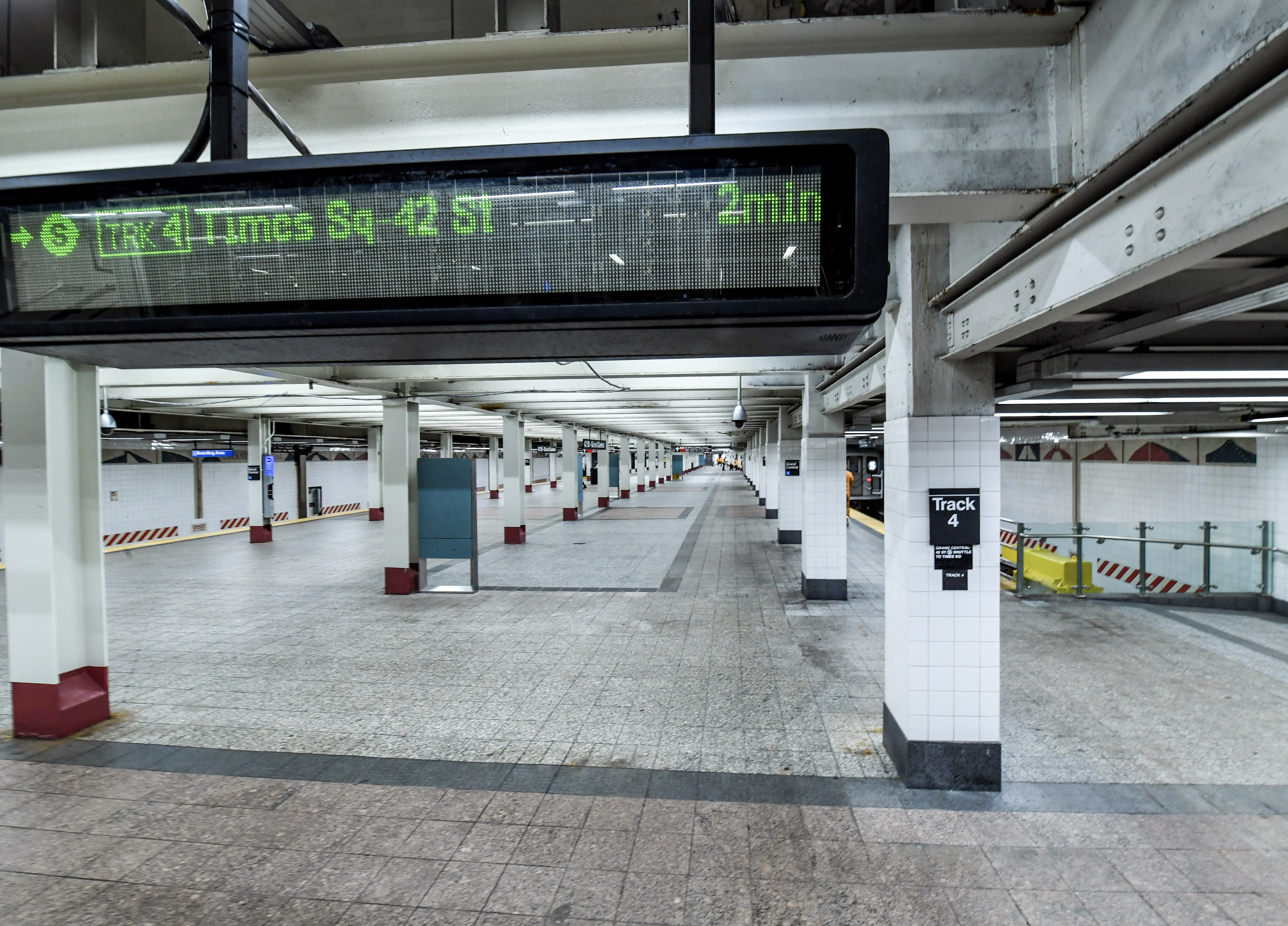
- Shuttle platform in September 2021

Station statistics
- Division: A (IRT)
- Line: IRT 42nd Street Shuttle
- Services: S (all except late nights)
- Platforms: 1 island platform
- Tracks: 2

Other information
- Opened: October 27, 1904; 122 years ago
- Rebuilt: 1966; 60 years ago (after fire); 2021; 5 years ago
- Accessible: Yes
- Former/other names: 42nd Street–Grand Central
Services
Preceding station	New York City Subway	Following station
Times Square S Terminus	42nd Street	Terminus
Non-revenue services and lines
Preceding station	New York City Subway	Following station
	no service	33rd Street Lexington Ave local
Track layout
Station service legend
Symbol	Description
Stops all times except late nights	Stops all times except late nights

The Grand Central shuttle platform dates from the original IRT subway, completed in 1904. It was originally a four-track express stop with two island platforms, one between each direction's local and express tracks. The present configuration of the shuttle has two tracks coming into the station, numbered 1 and 4. There is no track connection between tracks 1 and 4. The former southbound express track (track 2) and former northbound express track (track 3) were removed, with the latter closing on November 7, 2020. The 42nd Street Shuttle serves the station at all times except between approximately midnight and 6:00 a.m., when the shuttle does not run. The next station to the west is Times Square. When the station opened, Times Square was the next local station northbound, while 72nd Street was the next express station northbound. The next stations south, 33rd Street for local trains and 14th Street–Union Square for express trains, were the same as those on the current Lexington Avenue Line.

While track 4 terminates at a bumper block, track 1 merges with the southbound local track of the Lexington Avenue Line east of the station. The merge is generally used to transfer rolling stock to and from track 1, but is occasionally used during special railfan excursions. The other three tracks followed similar paths until the Lexington Avenue Line was extended north, turning this part of the line into a shuttle. The former alignment passes through the area that was rebuilt for the unopened shuttle platform in the 1910s. From the public passageway, none of the original support columns and roof are visible, since they were removed in exactly this area to open the way for the unused shuttle station.

Before 2020 there were three tracks, with two island platforms between them; the southern platform was extra wide, covering the area where track 2 had been located.

The eastern mezzanine above the shuttle platform leads to the Shuttle Passage, on the west side of Grand Central Terminal. When the terminal's Main Concourse was built, it was deliberately placed at the same level as the original IRT station's mezzanine, as 80 percent of the terminal's passengers were transferring to and from the subway. The remainder of Grand Central Terminal was then designed around the floor level of the Main Concourse and the subway mezzanine.

=== Image gallery ===
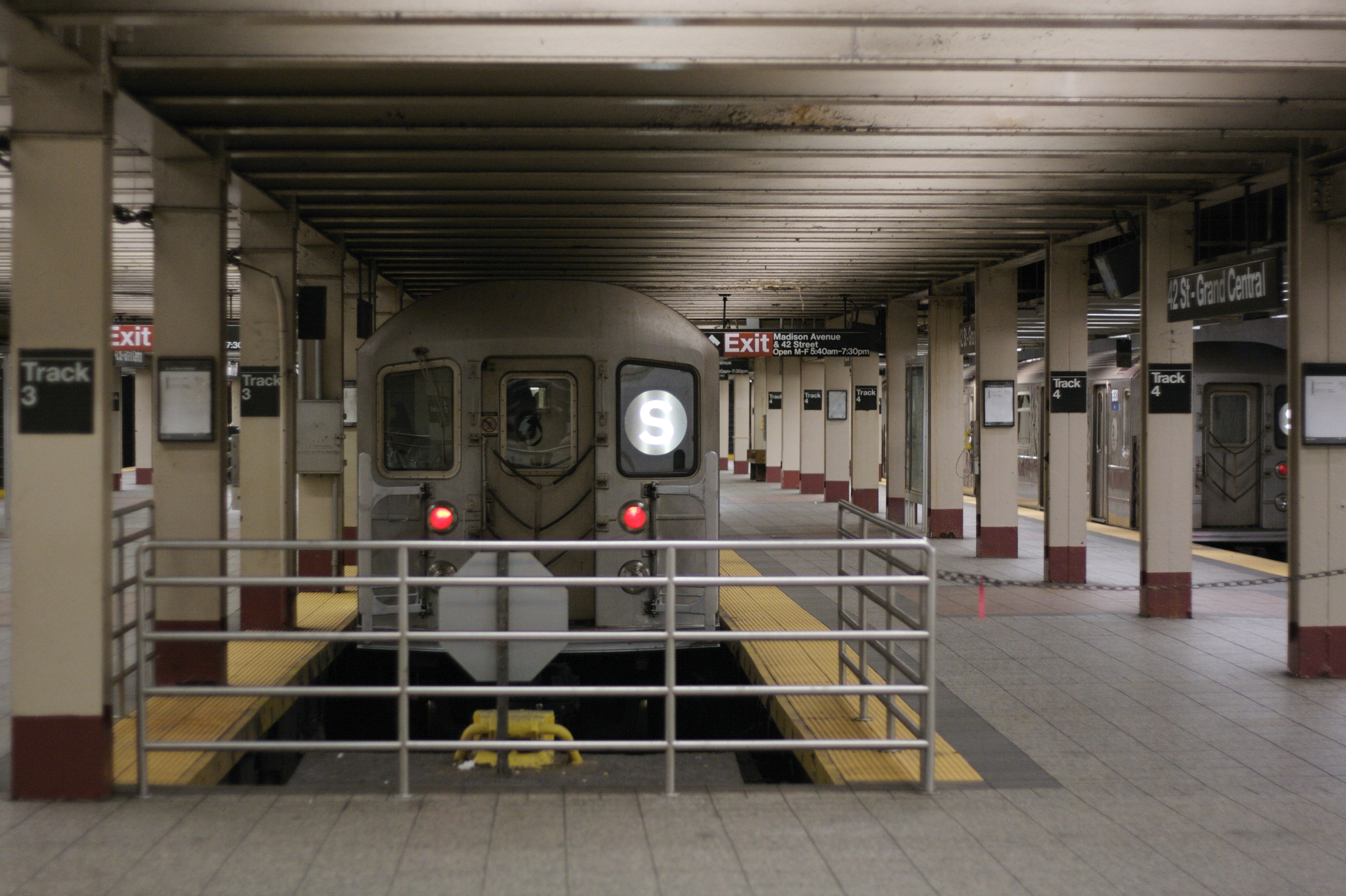
Train on track 3 (since removed)

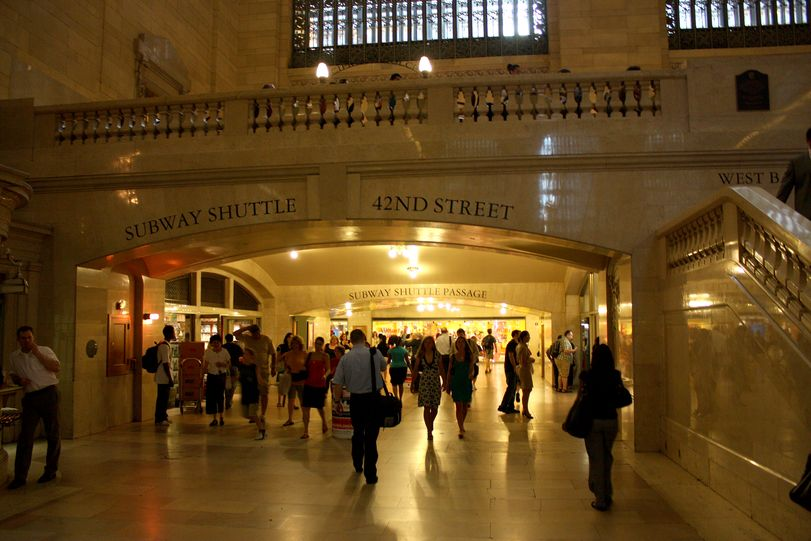
Entrance from the Grand Central Terminal Main Concourse

== IRT Lexington Avenue Line platforms ==
Grand Central–42 Street
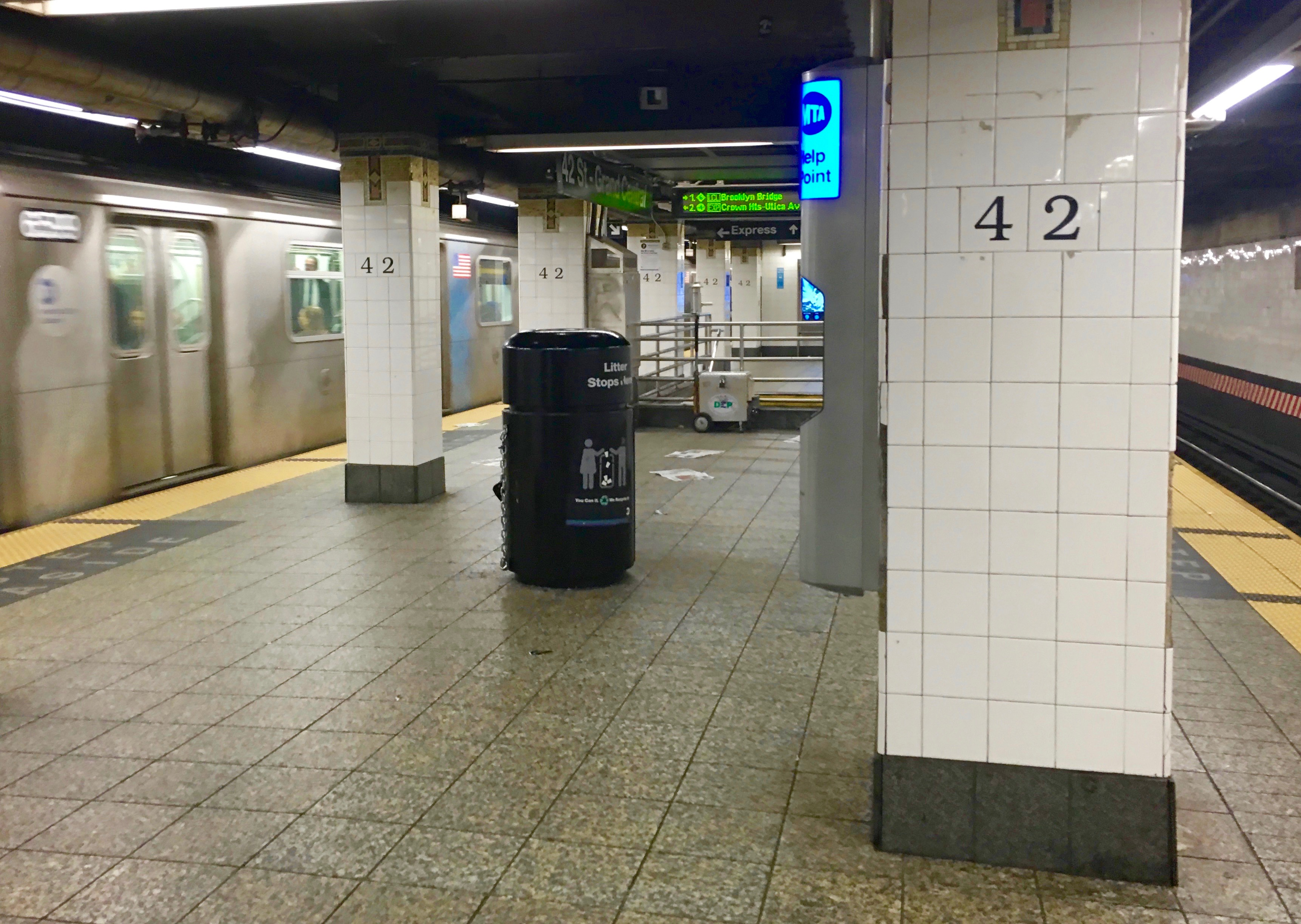
- 5 train departing

Station statistics
- Division: A (IRT)
- Line: IRT Lexington Avenue Line
- Services: 4 (all times); 5 (all times except late nights); 6 (all times) <6> (weekdays until 8:45 p.m., peak direction)
- Platforms: 2 island platforms cross-platform interchange
- Tracks: 4

Other information
- Opened: July 17, 1918; 108 years ago
- Accessible: Yes
- Former/other names: 42nd Street–Grand Central; Diagonal Station
Services
Preceding station	New York City Subway	Following station
59th Street 4 5 via 138th Street–Grand Concourse	Express	14th Street–Union Square 4 5 via Franklin Avenue–Medgar Evers College
51st Street 4 6 <6> toward Pelham Bay Park	Local	33rd Street 4 6 <6> toward Brooklyn Bridge–City Hall
Track layout
Station service legend
Symbol	Description
Stops all times except late nights	Stops all times except late nights
Stops all times	Stops all times
Stops late nights only	Stops late nights only
Stops rush hours in the peak direction only	Stops rush hours in the peak direction only

The Grand Central–42nd Street station is an express station on the IRT Lexington Avenue Line. It was also known as the Diagonal Station at the time of the Lexington Avenue Line station's construction, being oriented 45° from the street grid. The 4 and 6 trains stop here at all times; the 5 train stops here at all times except late nights; and the <6> train stops here during weekdays in the peak direction. The 5 train always makes express stops, and the 6 and <6> trains always make local stops; the 4 train makes express stops during the day and local stops at night. The next station to the north is 51st Street for local trains and 59th Street for express trains. The next station to the south is 33rd Street for local trains and 14th Street–Union Square for express trains.

The station has two island platforms, four tracks, and includes a crossover and a crossunder. The columns and beams here are massive, in order to support part of Grand Central Terminal and the office towers next to it. On one wall, there is a stylized steam locomotive mosaic. The northbound platform's side wall includes tile depicting a big passageway; the first room, as seen from the platform, has doors to a second room which appears to be a mechanical room. There is a correctly oriented compass rose inlaid on the floor of the mezzanine.

The Grand Central complex is home to the master tower which controls the entire Lexington Avenue Line, located south of the Lexington Avenue Line platforms.

Just south of the station, the southbound local track merges into the original downtown local track from the 42nd Street Shuttle, the only one remaining from the original four-track IRT subway (see § IRT 42nd Street Shuttle platform). The uptown tracks are about 10 feet (3.0 m) below the original grade at the point where they turn off. The old uptown express and local trackways that used to lead to the 42nd Street Shuttle are visible from the uptown local track. The unused ramps leading from the 42nd Street Shuttle are still in place. After the merge, the pairs of tracks in each direction diverge, with two on each side of the 1870 New York and Harlem Railroad Murray Hill Tunnel, which is now used for automobile traffic on Park Avenue.

=== Image gallery ===
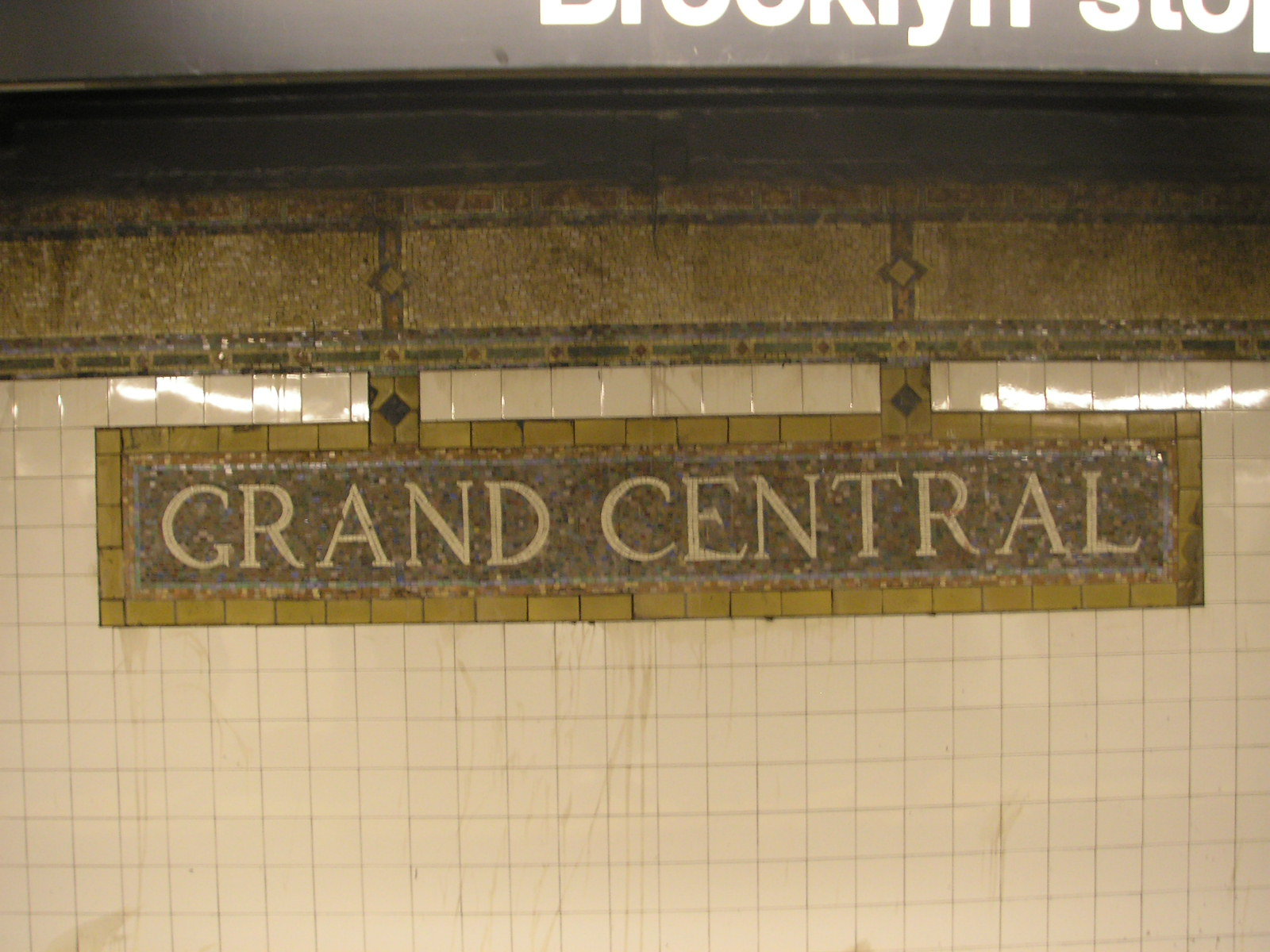
Tile mosaic

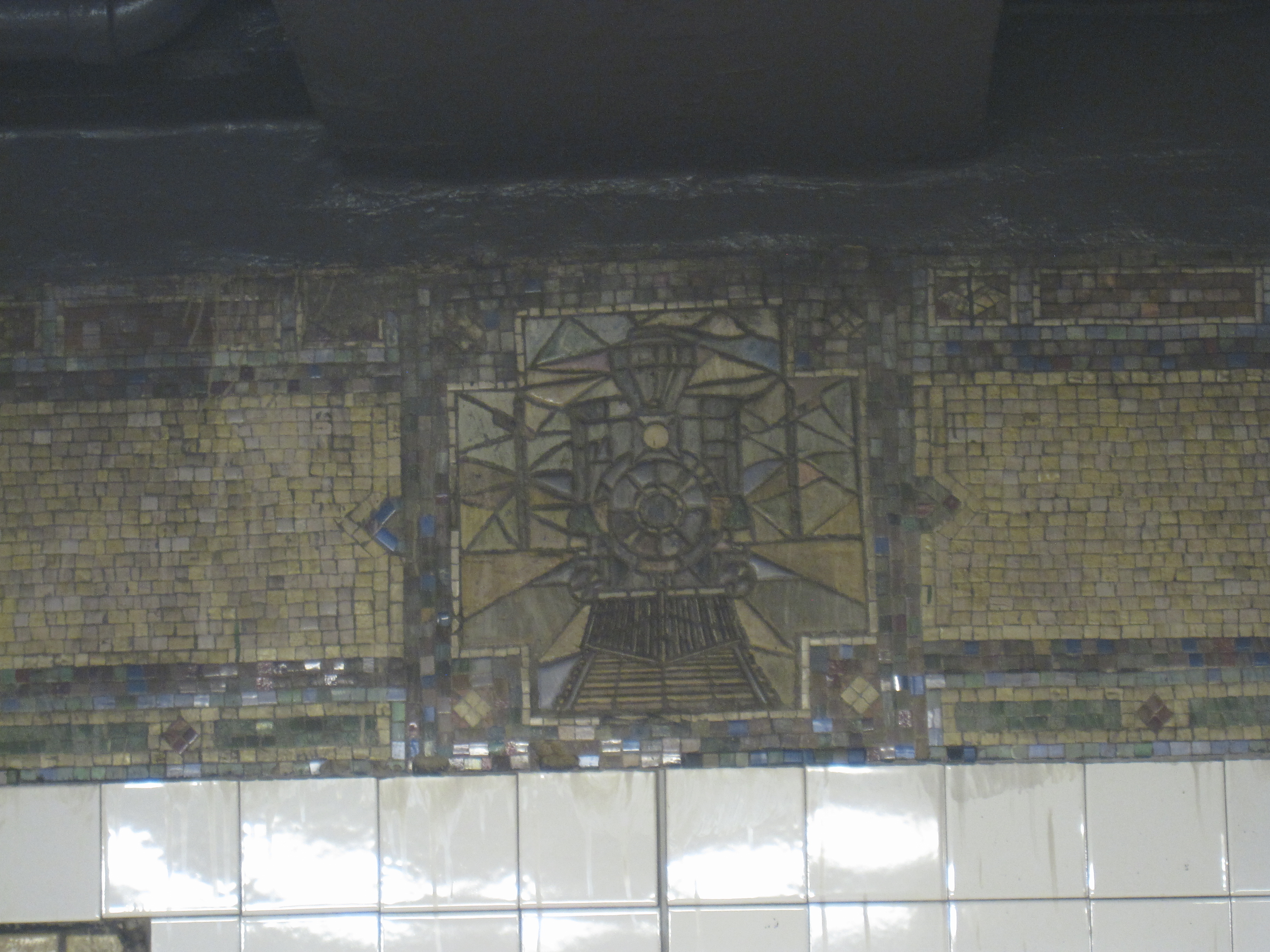
Close-up

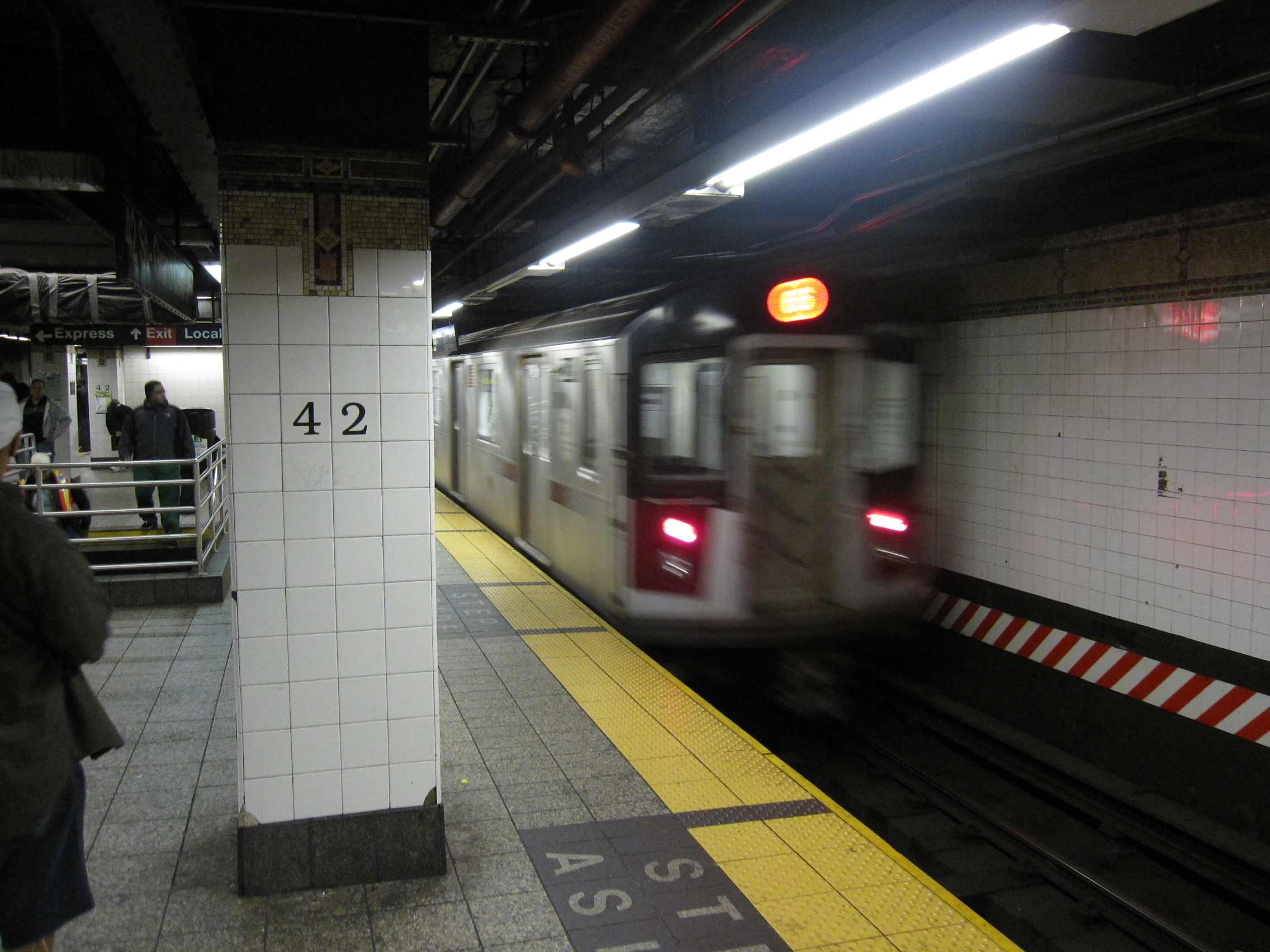
6 train on one of the local tracks

== IRT Flushing Line platform ==
Grand Central–42 Street
- An R188 7 train at the station

Station statistics
- Division: A (IRT)
- Line: IRT Flushing Line
- Services: 7 (all times) <7> (rush hours until 9:30 p.m., peak direction)
- Platforms: 1 island platform
- Tracks: 2

Other information
- Opened: June 22, 1915; 111 years ago
- Accessible: Yes
- Former/other names: 42nd Street–Grand Central
Services
Preceding station	New York City Subway	Following station
Fifth Avenue 7 <7> toward 34th Street–Hudson Yards	7 (New York City Subway service)	Vernon Boulevard–Jackson Avenue 7 <7> toward Flushing–Main Street
Track layout
Station service legend
Symbol	Description
Stops all times	Stops all times
Stops rush hours in the peak direction only	Stops rush hours in the peak direction only

The Grand Central–42nd Street station (signed as 42nd Street–Grand Central) on the Flushing Line has a single island platform and two tracks. The 7 train stops here at all times, and the <7> train stops here during rush hours in the peak direction. The station is between Fifth Avenue to the west and Vernon Boulevard–Jackson Avenue to the east.

There is a large arched ceiling, similar to other deep-level stations in the system and in other parts of the world. Along the platform are stairs and escalators to other lines and to a mezzanine and passageways under the Grand Central Terminal concourse. Exits and entrances are located at the center, west and east ends of the platform. There is an ADA-accessible elevator toward the west end. A newsstand/snack shop is located on the platform towards the east end. Fixed platform barriers, which are intended to prevent commuters falling to the tracks, are positioned near the platform edges.

Two sections of the old Steinway Tunnel loop remain intact and are accessible to MTA personnel via the southbound track approximately 200 feet (61 m) beyond the station. The third is between the tracks and is a pump room. Parts of the loop were converted into CBTC circuit breaker rooms.

The light and signage fixture that runs along the length of the platform is an art installation, entitled V-Beam, designed by Christopher Sproat.

At ground level, the Third Avenue entrance to the station contains another artwork, Abstract Futures by Hilma's Ghost, installed in 2025 as part of the MTA Arts & Design program. The artwork consists of three multicolored mosaic panels totaling 600 square feet (56 m^{2}), which depicts an allegory with a tarot card character known as "the Fool". The panel closest to the escalators symbolize the character's journey to New York City; the central panel depicts a "wheel of fortune"; and the panel nearest the turnstiles depicts the character undergoing a "spiritual metamorphosis".

=== Image gallery ===
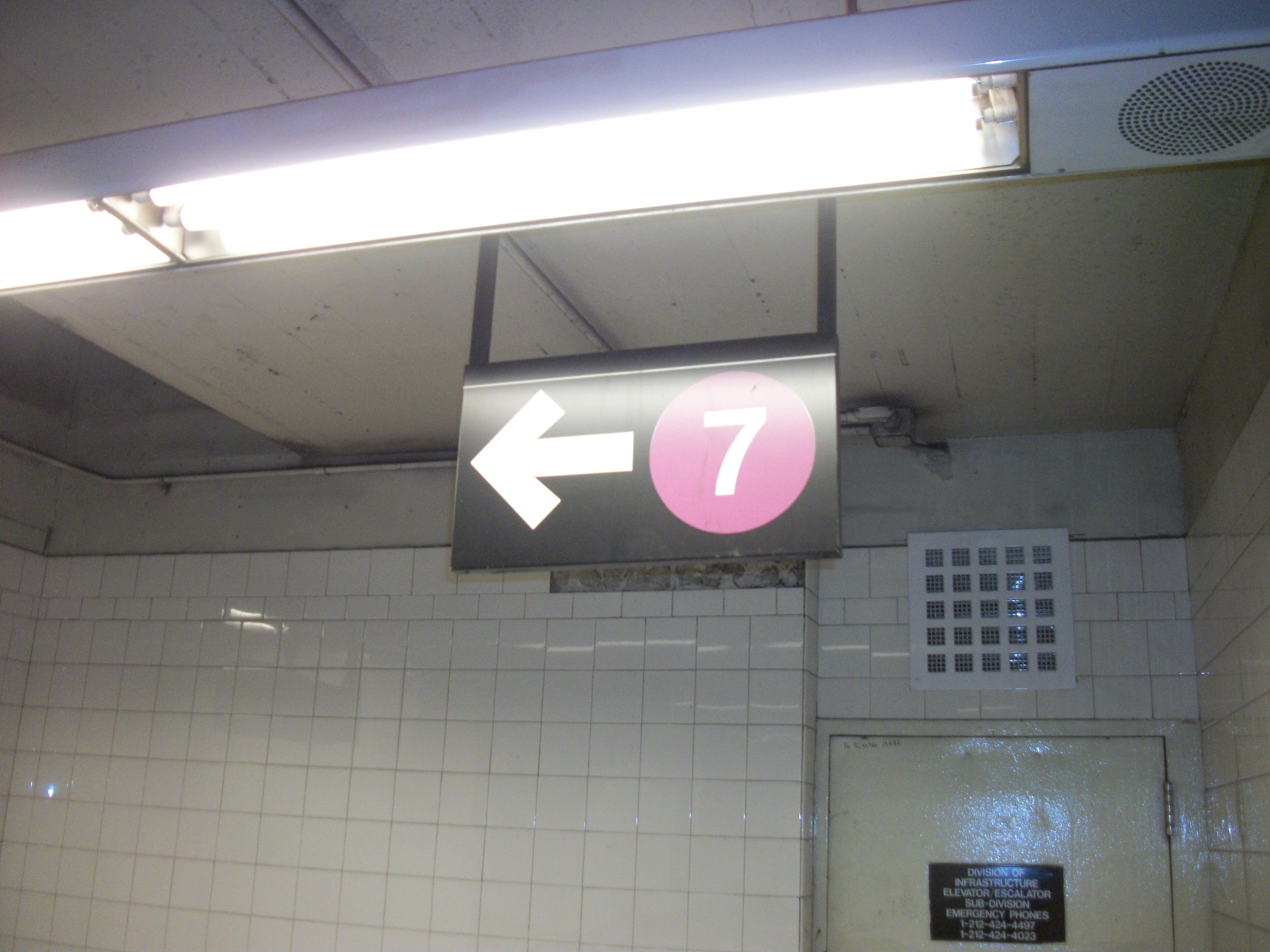
Directional sign above the staircase to the Flushing Line platform

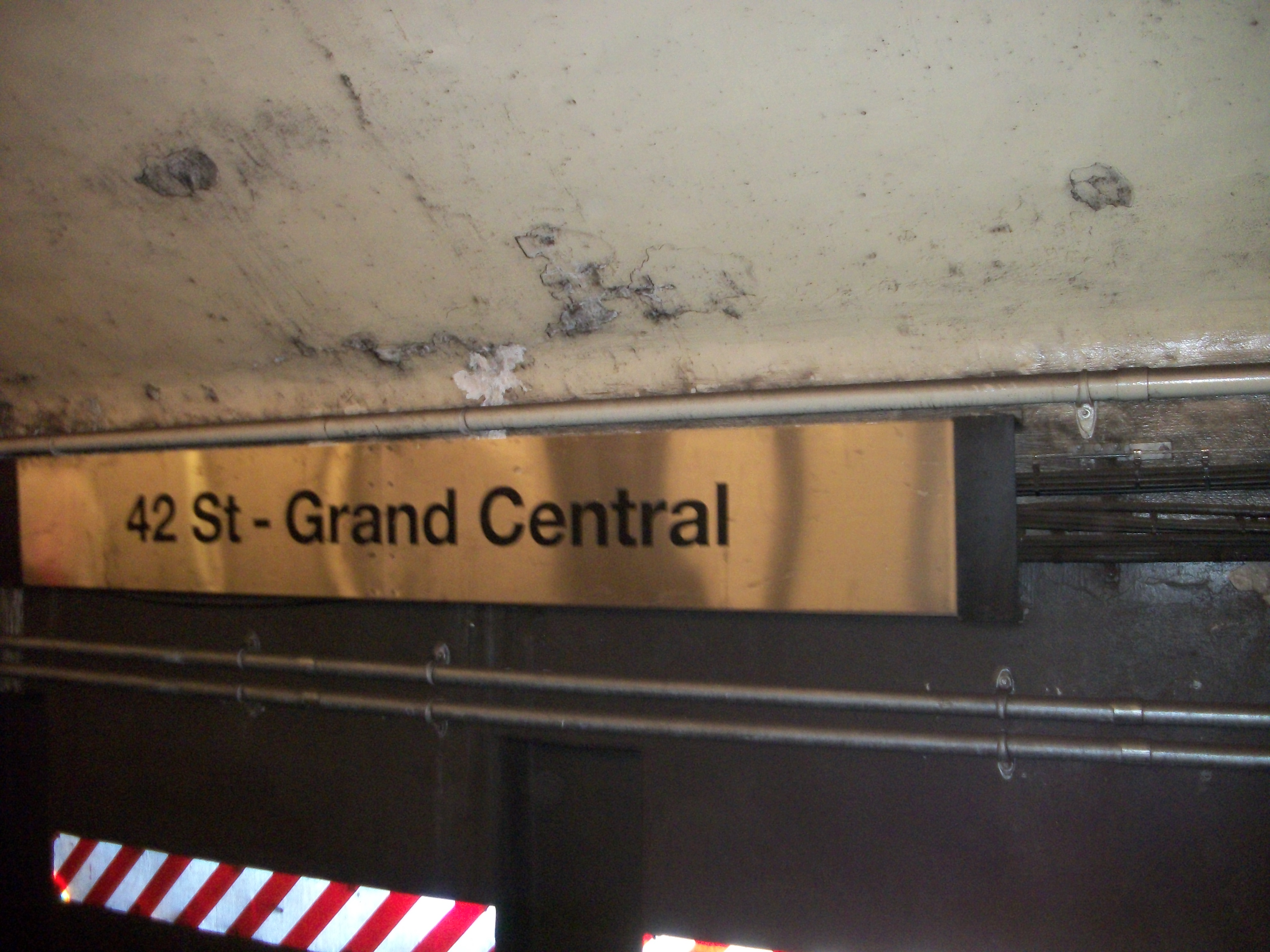
Metal sign on tunnel wall with 42 St–Grand Central name

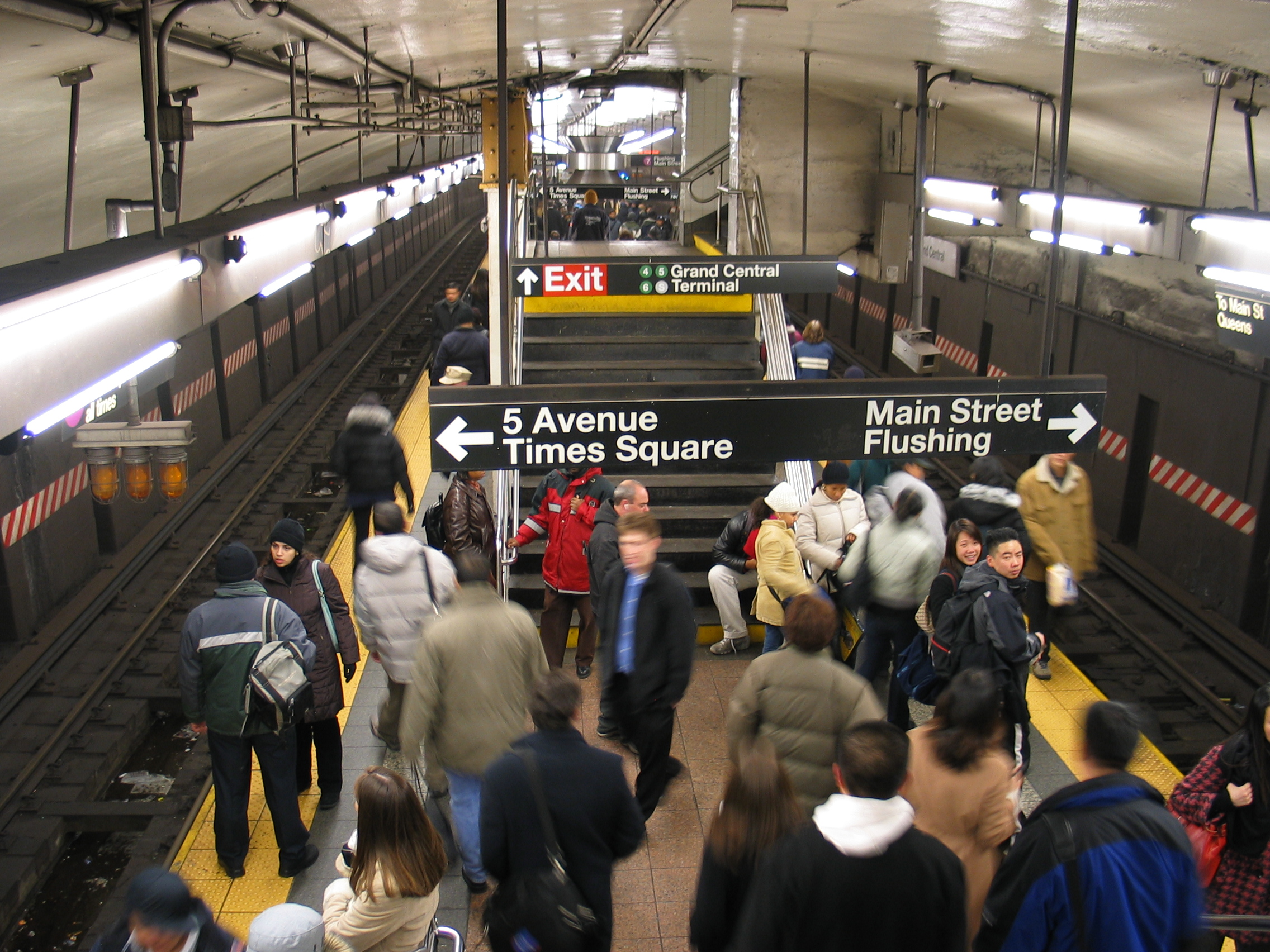
Looking down a staircase toward the IRT Flushing Line platform

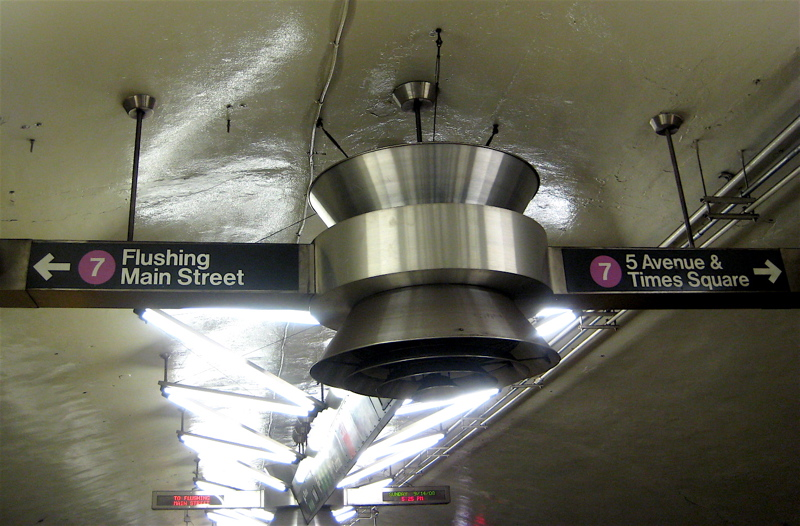
V-Beam artwork and signage

== IRT Third Avenue Line transfers ==
For over a decade, free transfers were provided between the subway station and 42nd Street on the elevated IRT Third Avenue Line. This started on June 14, 1942, the day after the IRT Second Avenue Line, which provided access to Queensboro Plaza and the IRT Flushing Line, was closed. The Third Avenue Line closed on May 12, 1955, rendering the transfer obsolete.
