= 34th Street Ferry station =

Former Manhattan Railway elevated station (closed 1930)

34th St. Ferry

General information
- Location: Kips Bay, Manhattan, New York
- Coordinates: 40°44′37″N 73°58′23″W
- System: Former Manhattan Railway elevated station
- Operator: Interborough Rapid Transit Company
- Line: 34th Street Branch
- Platforms: 1 island platform
- Tracks: 2

Construction
- Structure type: Elevated

History
- Opened: July 1, 1880; 146 years ago
- Closed: July 14, 1930; 96 years ago

Former services
Preceding station	Interborough Rapid Transit	Following station
Second Avenue toward Third Avenue	34th Street Shuttle	Terminus
Location

The 34th Street Ferry station was a station on the 34th Street Shuttle that branched off of the demolished IRT Third Avenue Line in Manhattan, New York City. The elevated spur operated from July 1, 1880, to July 14, 1930. Located on the east side of First Avenue, the station had two tracks and one island platform. It served the 34th Street Ferry Terminal, which provided connecting services to the Long Island Rail Road's passenger terminal in Long Island City.

The next stop on the shuttle was Second Avenue.

The city condemned the property following the end of shuttle service and authorized the sale and removal of the elevated structure on January 28, 1931. The demolition work was put out to bid, with the city expecting receive payment for the right to perform the work as the contractor would profit from metal salvaging, but no companies wanted to pay to remove the structure. The work was subsequently rebid, and demolition began on July 15, 1931. Demolition of the structure was completed in September 1931.
