= 34th Street station (IRT Second Avenue Line) =

Former Manhattan Railway elevated station (closed 1942)

34th St. / 2nd Ave.
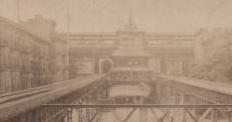
- Both levels of the 34th Street station when viewed from 34th Street

General information
- Location: East 34th Street and 2nd Avenue; Midtown Manhattan, Manhattan, New York
- Coordinates: 40°44′41.31″N 73°58′32.95″W
- System: Former Manhattan Railway elevated station
- Operator: Interborough Rapid Transit Company; City of New York (after 1940)
- Lines: Second Avenue Line; 34th Street Branch
- Platforms: 2 side platforms (main line); 1 island platform (shuttle)
- Tracks: 5 (3 – main line) (2 – shuttle)

Construction
- Structure type: Elevated

History
- Opened: March 1, 1880; 146 years ago
- Closed: June 13, 1942; 84 years ago

Former services
Preceding station	Interborough Rapid Transit	Following station
42nd Street toward 129th Street	Second Avenue Local	23rd Street toward South Ferry
Third Avenue Terminus	34th Street Shuttle	34th Street Ferry Terminus
Location

The 34th Street station was a local station on the demolished IRT Second Avenue Line in Manhattan, New York City. It had two levels. The upper level had three tracks and two side platforms and was used for the Second Avenue line trains. The lower level, also known as the Second Avenue station, had two tracks and one island platform and was used by 34th Street shuttle trains. The next stop to the north was 42nd Street. The next stop to the south was 23rd Street. The next eastbound stop on the shuttle was 34th Street Ferry. The next westbound stop on the shuttle was Third Avenue. The shuttle platform closed on July 14, 1930, and the main line station closed on June 13, 1942. There is a proposed station with the same name on the phase 3 of the Second Avenue Subway.
