= 90th Street–Elmhurst Avenue station =

New York City Subway station in Queens

90 Street–Elmhurst Avenue
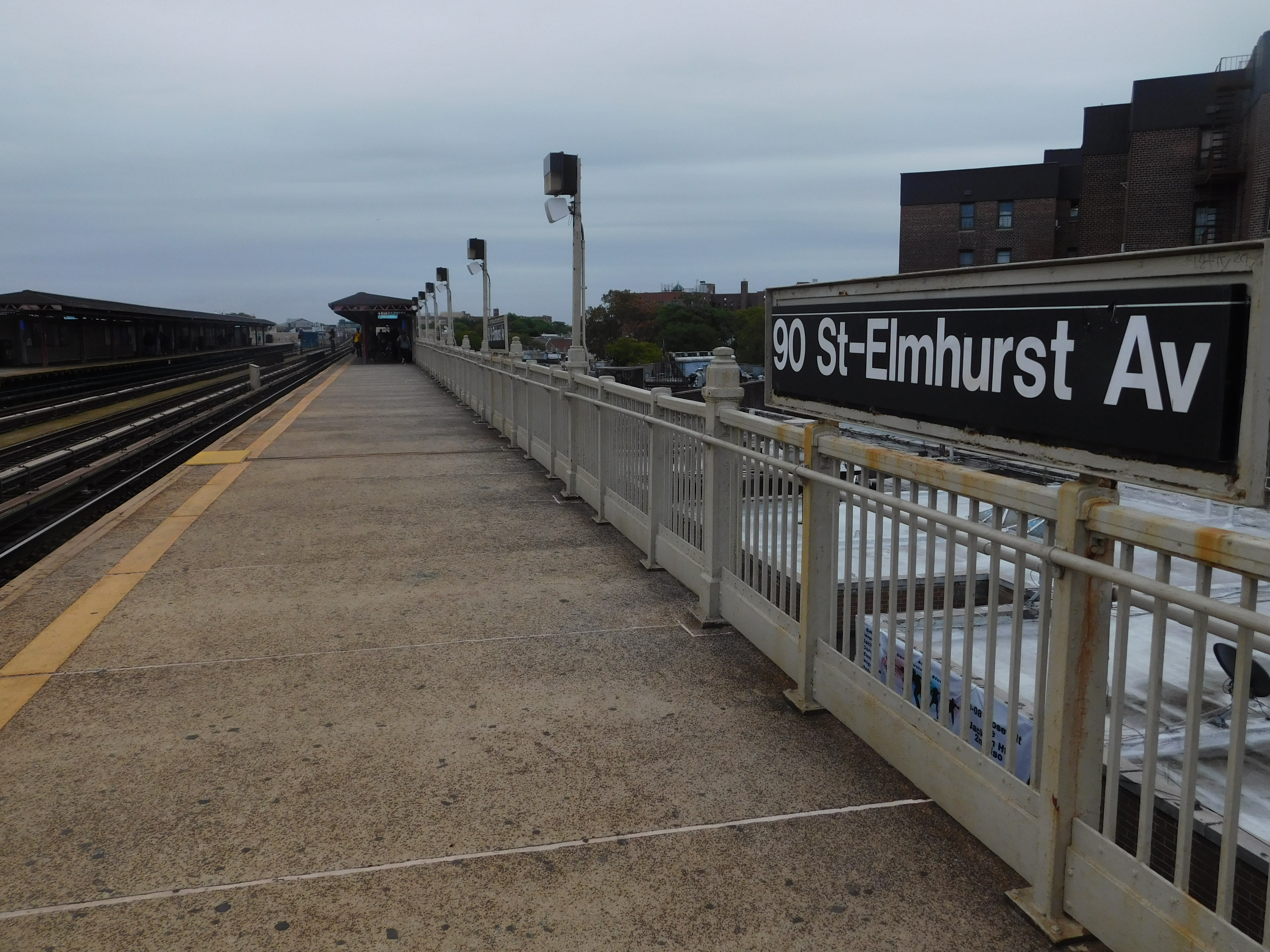

Station statistics
- Address: 90th Street, Elmhurst Avenue & Roosevelt Avenue; Queens, New York
- Borough: Queens
- Locale: Elmhurst, Jackson Heights
- Coordinates: 40°44′54″N 73°52′35″W
- Division: A (IRT)
- Line: IRT Flushing Line
- Services: 7 (all times)
- Structure: Elevated
- Platforms: 2 side platforms
- Tracks: 3

Other information
- Opened: April 21, 1917; 109 years ago

Traffic
- 2025: 4,712,110 ▼0.3%
- Rank: 64 out of 423
Services
| Preceding station | New York City Subway | Following station |
|---|---|---|
| 82nd Street–Jackson Heights toward 34th Street–Hudson Yards | Local | Junction Boulevard toward Flushing–Main Street |
does not stop here
Location
Location within New York City Subway
Location within New York City
Location within New York
Track layout
Street map
Station service legend
| Symbol | Description |
| Stops all times | Stops all times |

The 90th Street–Elmhurst Avenue station is a local station on the IRT Flushing Line of the New York City Subway. Located at 90th Street and Elmhurst Avenue on the border of Elmhurst and Jackson Heights in Queens, it is served by the 7 train at all times. The <7> train skips this station when it operates.

== History ==
=== Early history ===
The 1913 Dual Contracts called for the Interborough Rapid Transit Company (IRT) and Brooklyn Rapid Transit Company (BRT; later Brooklyn–Manhattan Transit Corporation, or BMT) to build new lines in Brooklyn, Queens, and the Bronx. Queens did not receive many new IRT and BRT lines compared to Brooklyn and the Bronx, since the city's Public Service Commission (PSC) wanted to alleviate subway crowding in the other two boroughs first before building in Queens, which was relatively undeveloped. The IRT Flushing Line was to be one of two Dual Contracts lines in the borough, along with the Astoria Line; it would connect Flushing and Long Island City, two of Queens's oldest settlements, to Manhattan via the Steinway Tunnel. When the majority of the line was built in the early 1910s, most of the route went through undeveloped land, and Roosevelt Avenue had not been constructed. Community leaders advocated for more Dual Contracts lines to be built in Queens to allow development there. The Flushing Line was opened from Queensboro Plaza to Alburtis Avenue (now 103rd Street–Corona Plaza) on April 21, 1917, with a local station at 90th Street.

=== Later years ===
The city government took over the IRT's operations on June 12, 1940. The IRT routes were given numbered designations in 1948 with the introduction of "R-type" rolling stock, which contained rollsigns with numbered designations for each service. The route from Times Square to Flushing became known as the 7. On October 17, 1949, the joint BMT/IRT operation of the Flushing Line ended, and the line became the responsibility of the IRT. After the end of BMT/IRT dual service, the New York City Board of Transportation announced that the Flushing Line platforms would be lengthened to 11 IRT car lengths; the platforms were only able to fit nine 51-foot-long IRT cars beforehand. The platforms at the station were extended in 1955–1956 to accommodate 11-car trains. However, nine-car trains continued to run on the 7 route until 1962, when they were extended to ten cars. With the opening of the 1964 New York World's Fair, trains were lengthened to eleven cars.

On February 2, 2019, a fatal gang shooting occurred at the station, carried out by an alleged MS-13 or SUR 13 member who shot another person of rival 18th Street gang.

== Station layout ==
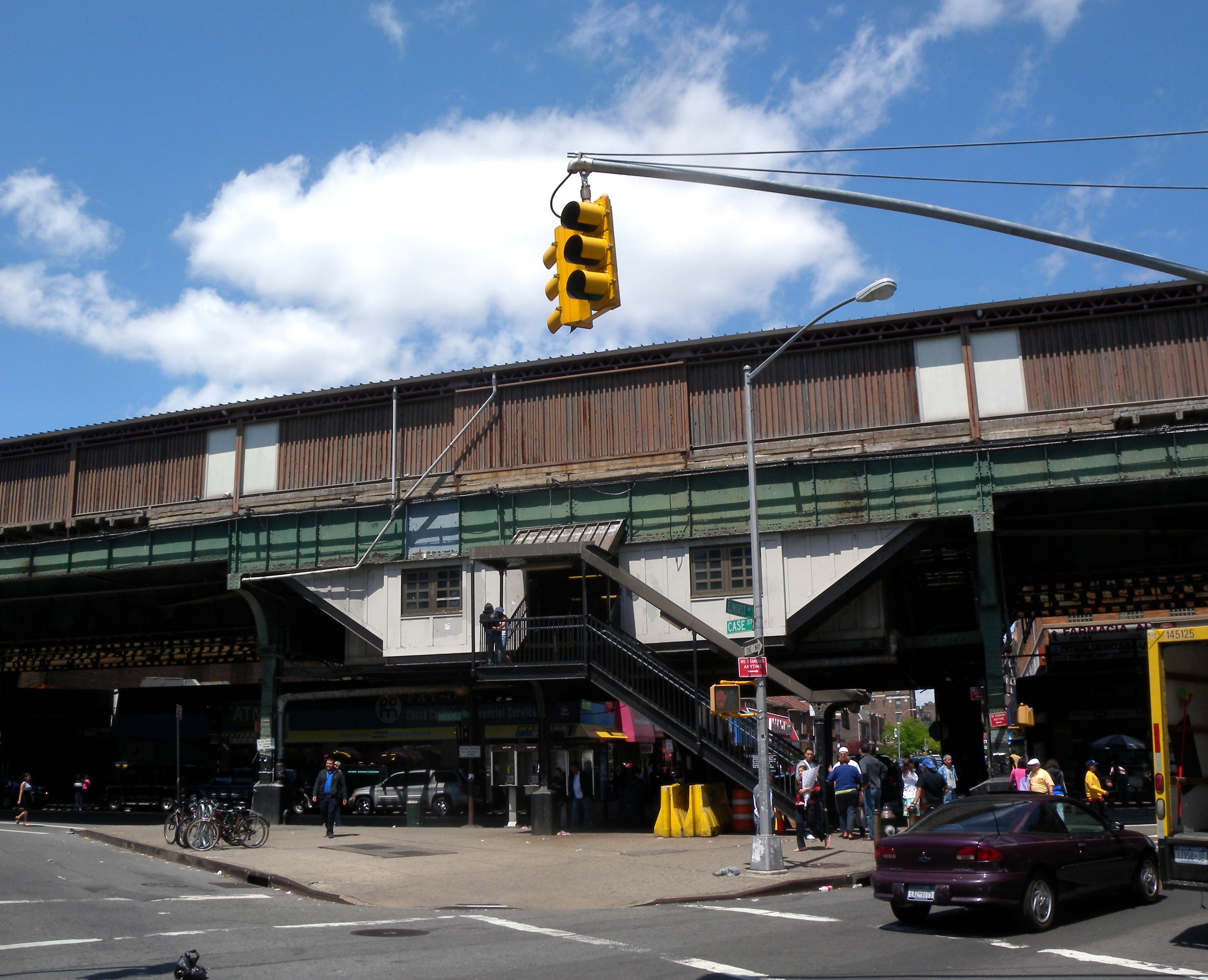
View from street

This elevated station has three tracks and two side platforms. The center track is used by the peak direction <7> express service during rush hours.

Both platforms have beige windscreens and brown canopies with red support frames and columns in the center and beige, waist-high, steel fences with lampposts at regular intervals at either ends. The windscreens have translucent panels by the exit staircases and the station signs are in the standard black name plates in white lettering.

=== Exits ===
This station has one elevated station house below the center of the platforms and tracks. The north side has two staircases going down to either northern corners of 90th Street and Roosevelt Avenue while the south side has one staircase going down to the triangle formed by Roosevelt Avenue, Elmhurst Avenue, and Case Street.

Inside the station house is a token booth in the center. On the south (geographical west) side is a turnstile bank that leads to a waiting area/crossover and one staircase going up to each platform. On the north (geographical east) side, each side has a bank of two turnstiles and one staircase going up to the platform.
