= 33rd Street–Rawson Street station =

New York City Subway station in Queens

33 Street–Rawson Street
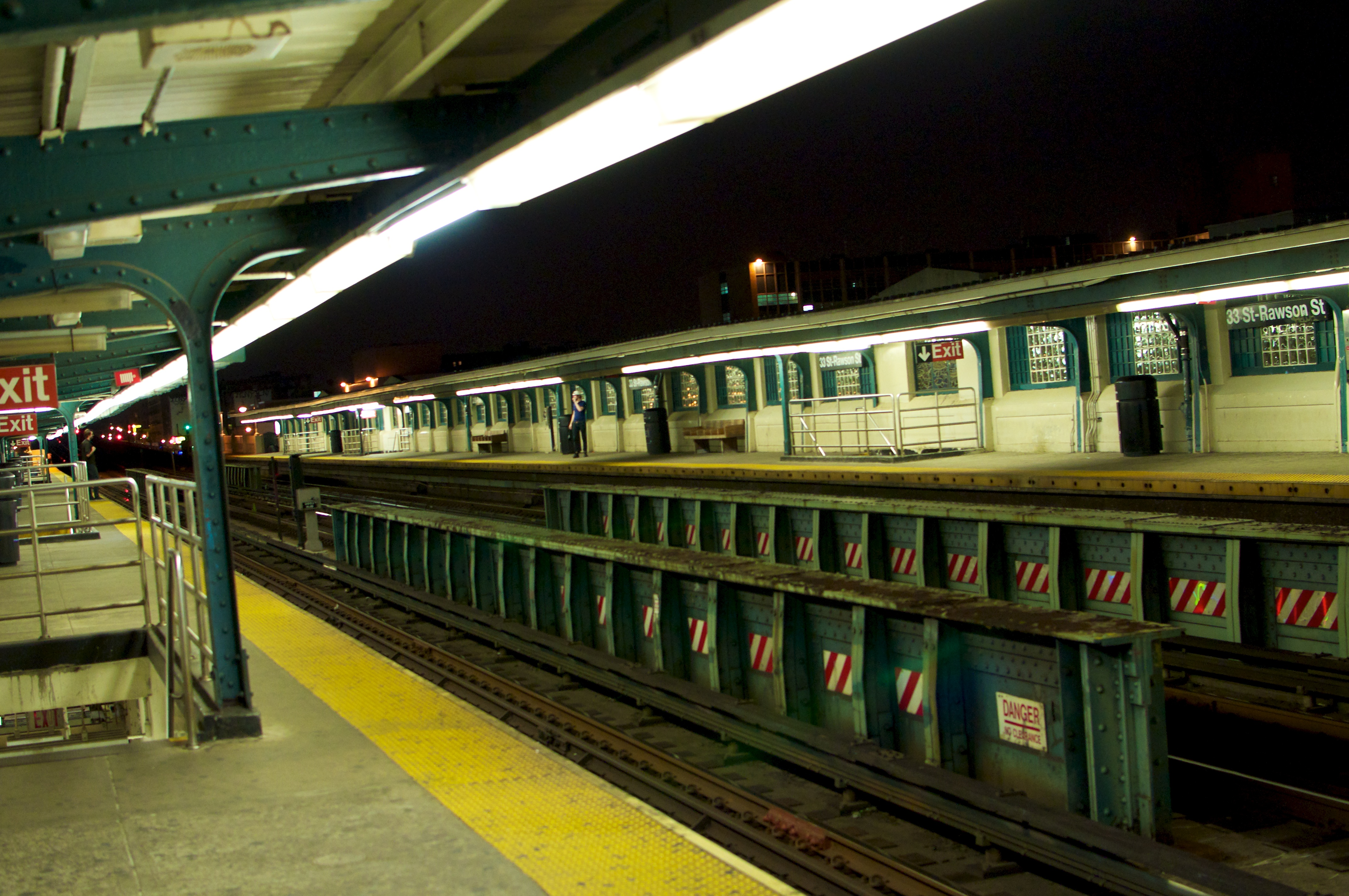

Station statistics
- Address: 33rd Street & Queens Boulevard; Long Island City, New York
- Borough: Queens
- Locale: Long Island City
- Coordinates: 40°44′40.62″N 73°55′52.7″W
- Division: A (IRT)
- Line: IRT Flushing Line
- Services: 7 (all times)
- Transit: NYCT Bus: Q39; MTA Bus: Q32, Q60
- Structure: Elevated
- Platforms: 2 side platforms
- Tracks: 3

Other information
- Opened: April 21, 1917; 109 years ago
- Accessible: No; under construction
- Former/other names: Rawson Street

Traffic
- 2025: 2,218,915 ▲30.1%
- Rank: 164 out of 423
Services
Preceding station	New York City Subway	Following station
Queensboro Plaza toward 34th Street–Hudson Yards	Local	40th Street–Lowery Street toward Flushing–Main Street
does not stop here
Location
Location within New York City Subway
Location within New York City
Location within New York
Track layout
Street map
Station service legend
Symbol	Description
Stops all times	Stops all times

The 33rd Street–Rawson Street station (announced as the 33rd Street station on trains) is a local station on the IRT Flushing Line of the New York City Subway. Located over Queens Boulevard on a concrete viaduct, it is served by the 7 train at all times.

== History ==
=== Early history ===
The 1913 Dual Contracts called for the Interborough Rapid Transit Company (IRT) and Brooklyn Rapid Transit Company (BRT; later Brooklyn–Manhattan Transit Corporation, or BMT) to build new lines in Brooklyn, Queens, and the Bronx. Queens did not receive many new IRT and BRT lines compared to Brooklyn and the Bronx, since the city's Public Service Commission (PSC) wanted to alleviate subway crowding in the other two boroughs first before building in Queens, which was relatively undeveloped. The IRT Flushing Line was to be one of two Dual Contracts lines in the borough, along with the Astoria Line; it would connect Flushing and Long Island City, two of Queens's oldest settlements, to Manhattan via the Steinway Tunnel. When the majority of the line was built in the early 1910s, most of the route went through undeveloped land, and Roosevelt Avenue had not been constructed. Community leaders advocated for more Dual Contracts lines to be built in Queens to allow development there.

The Flushing Line was opened from Queensboro Plaza to Alburtis Avenue (now 103rd Street–Corona Plaza) on April 21, 1917, with a local station at 33rd Street.

=== Later years ===
The city government took over the IRT's operations on June 12, 1940. The IRT routes were given numbered designations in 1948 with the introduction of "R-type" rolling stock, which contained rollsigns with numbered designations for each service. The route from Times Square to Flushing became known as the 7. On October 17, 1949, the joint BMT/IRT operation of the Flushing Line ended, and the line became the responsibility of the IRT. After the end of BMT/IRT dual service, the New York City Board of Transportation announced that the Flushing Line platforms would be lengthened to 11 IRT car lengths; the platforms were only able to fit nine 51-foot-long IRT cars beforehand. The platforms at the station were extended in 1955–1956 to accommodate 11-car trains. However, nine-car trains continued to run on the 7 route until 1962, when they were extended to ten cars. With the opening of the 1964 New York World's Fair, trains were lengthened to eleven cars.

The present-day 33rd, 40th, and 46th Streets were originally respectively known as Rawson, Lowery, and Bliss Streets until the 1930s, when they were given numbered street names. To avoid confusion, the 33rd Street–Rawson Street, 40th Street–Lowery Street, and 46th Street–Bliss Street stations displayed both the new and old names of the respective street. Since a New York City Transit Authority rule prohibited subway stations from being named after nonexistent streets, the Metropolitan Transportation Authority (MTA) removed the old names of each street from station signs and subway maps in 1998. Local residents opposed the renaming and unsuccessfully attempted to persuade the MTA to restore the old names. The New York City Council passed a law in July 2003, giving both the old and new names to all three streets; after new street signs were installed in September 2003, the MTA agreed to restore the old names of each station.

In December 2019, the MTA announced that this station would become ADA-accessible as part of the agency's 2020–2024 Capital Program. A requests for proposals was put out on May 18, 2023 for the contract for a project bundle to add elevators at 13 stations, including 33rd Street–Rawson Street. The contract to add two elevators at the station was awarded in December 2023.

== Station layout ==
The station has two side platforms and three tracks. The center track is used by peak-direction <7> express trains during rush hours.

=== Exits ===
Both exits are under the tracks in the median of Queens Boulevard. The full-time exit is at 33rd Street, with two stairs from each platform, and the part-time exit is at 34th Street, also with two stairs from each platform. The part-time exit has a crossunder to allow free transfers between opposite directions while the full-time one does not, even though it has the layouts that could allow one.

== Image gallery ==
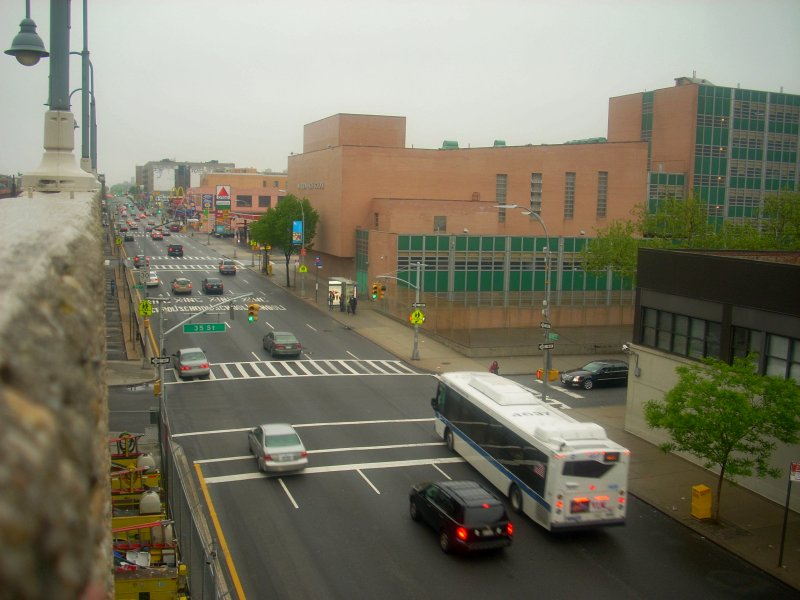
View of Queens Boulevard from the 33rd Street station

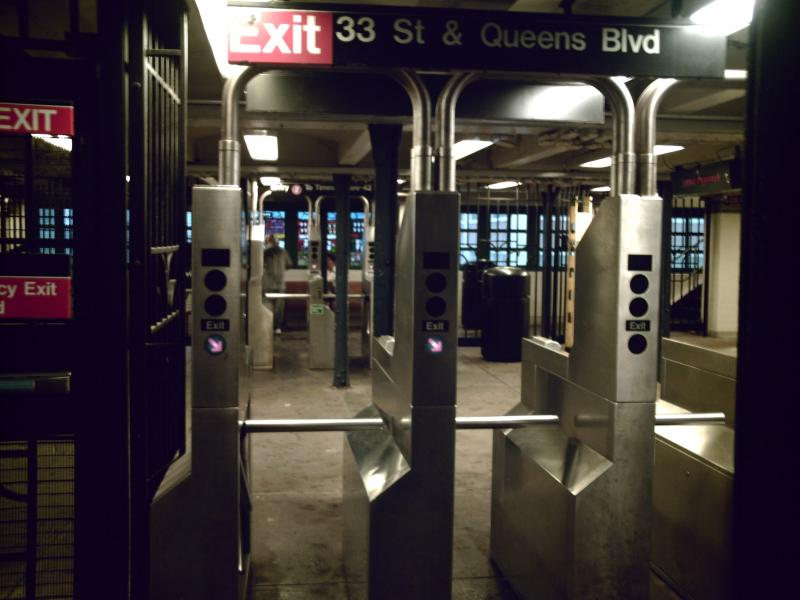
Mezzanine

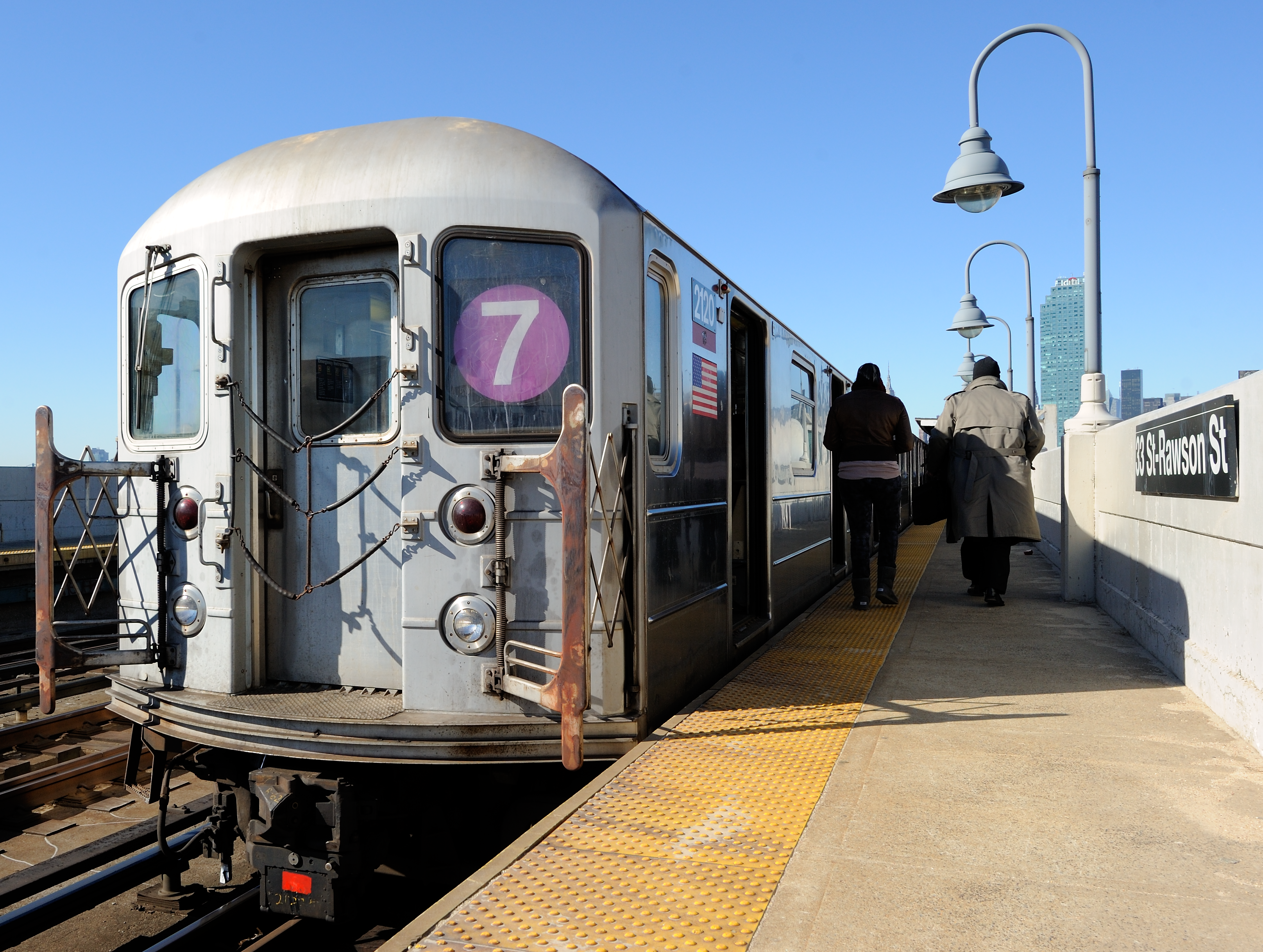
7 train stopped at the platform

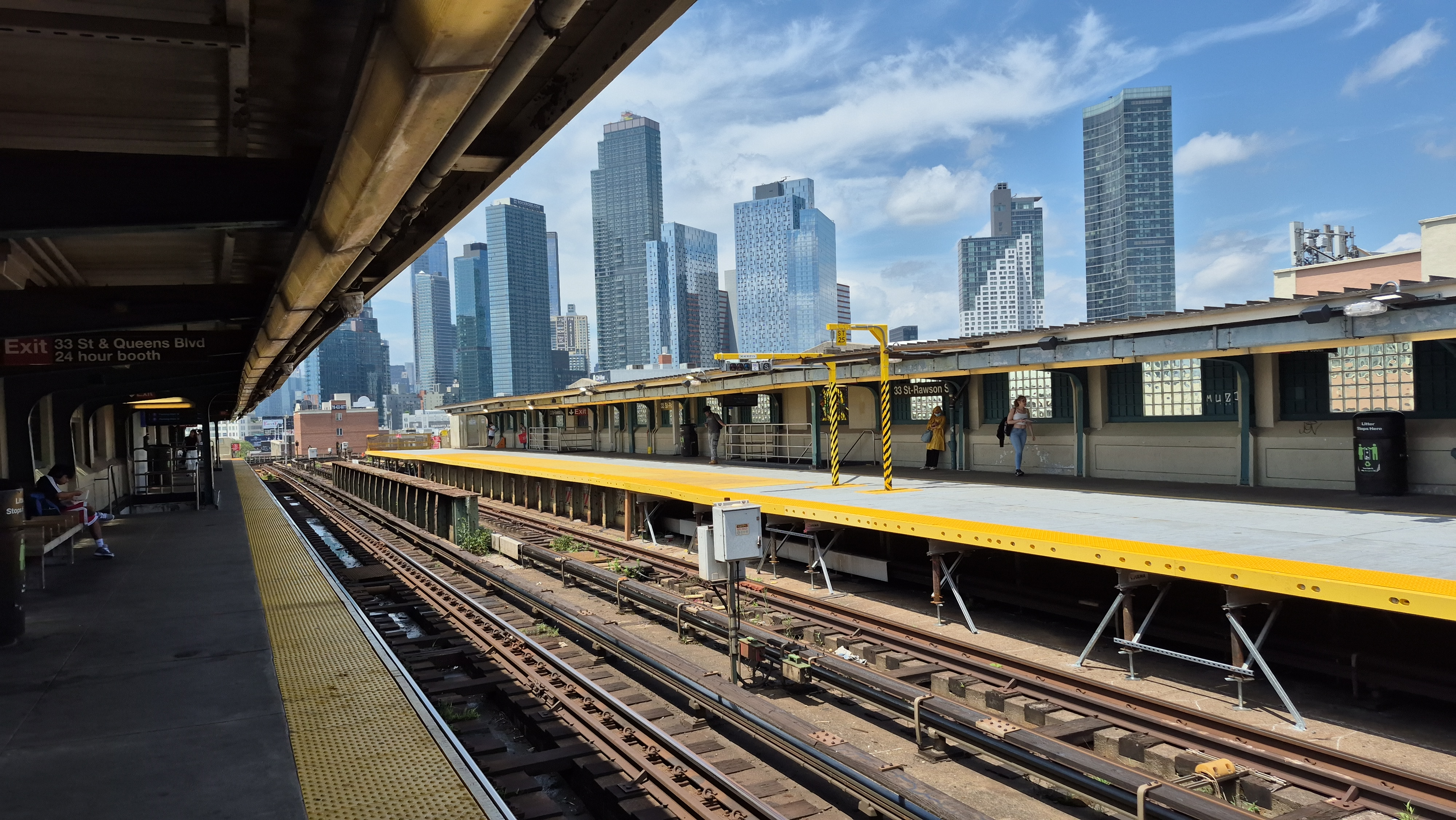
Temporary platform in use during 7 train construction in July 2025.
