= 61st Street–Woodside station =

New York City Subway station in Queens

61 Street–Woodside
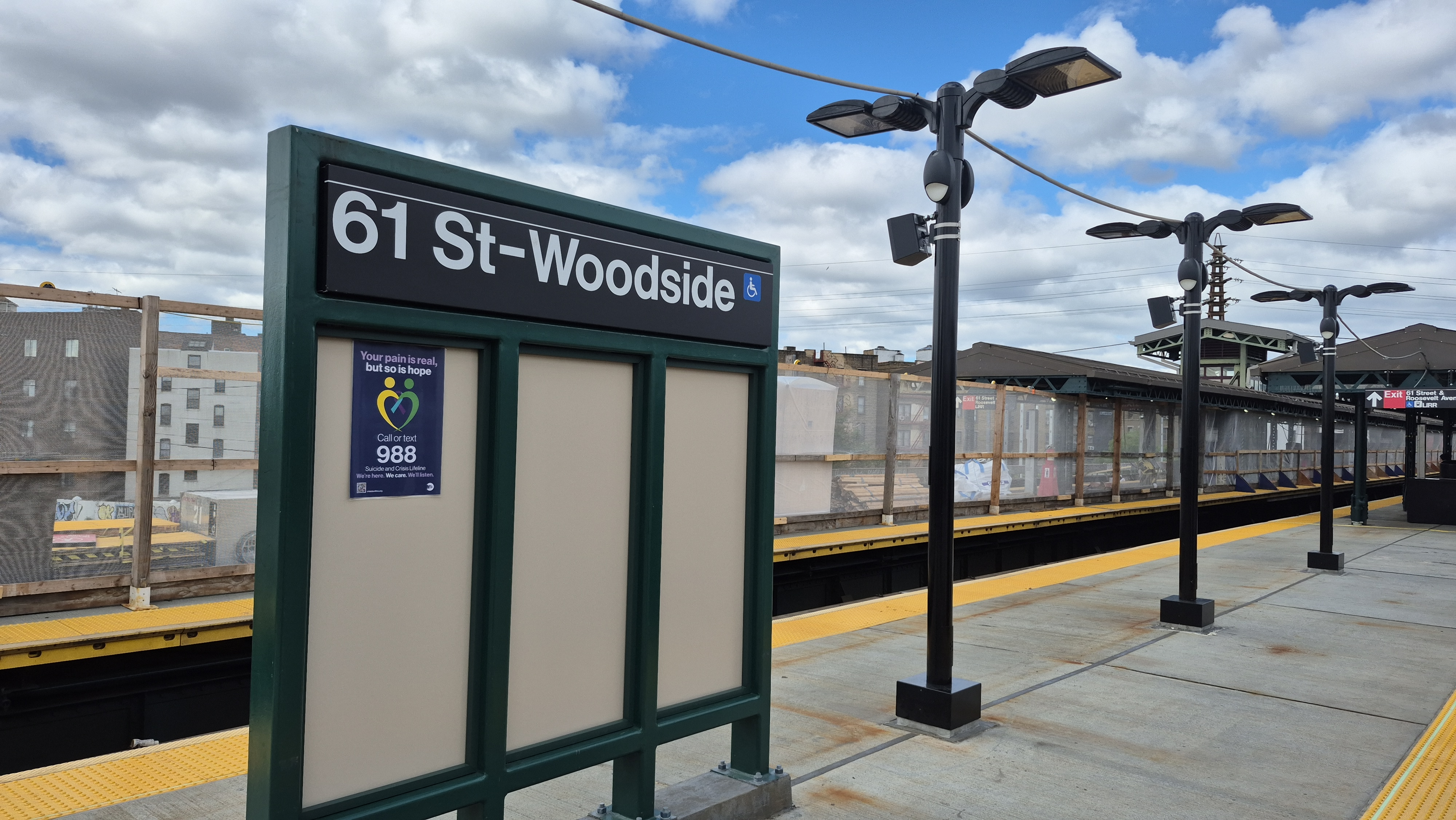
- Renovated Manhattan-bound platform in 2026

Station statistics
- Address: 61st Street & Roosevelt Avenue; Woodside, New York
- Borough: Queens
- Locale: Woodside
- Coordinates: 40°44′44.19″N 73°54′10.68″W
- Division: A (IRT)
- Line: IRT Flushing Line
- Services: 7 (all times) <7> (rush hours until 9:30 p.m., peak direction)
- Transit: MTA Bus: Q18, Q32, Q53 SBS, Q70 SBS; LIRR: City Terminal Zone, Port Washington Branch (at Woodside)
- Structure: Elevated
- Platforms: 2 island platforms cross-platform interchange
- Tracks: 3

Other information
- Opened: April 21, 1917; 109 years ago
- Accessible: Yes
- Former/other names: Woodside–61st Street; 61st Street

Traffic
- 2025: 3,808,140 ▲6.6%
- Rank: 83 out of 423
Services
Preceding station	New York City Subway	Following station
Queensboro Plaza <7> toward 34th Street–Hudson Yards	Express	Junction Boulevard <7> toward Flushing–Main Street
52nd Street 7 toward 34th Street–Hudson Yards	Local	69th Street 7 One-way operation
46th Street–Bliss Street 7 One-way operation	Local	74th Street–Broadway 7 toward Flushing–Main Street
Location
Location within New York City Subway
Location within New York City
Location within New York
Track layout
Street map
Station service legend
Symbol	Description
Stops all times	Stops all times
Stops rush hours in the peak direction only	Stops rush hours in the peak direction only

The 61st Street–Woodside station (announced as the Woodside–61st Street station on trains) is an express station on the IRT Flushing Line of the New York City Subway located at 61st Street and Roosevelt Avenue in Woodside, Queens. It is served by the 7 train, with additional peak-direction <7> service during rush hours.

61st Street–Woodside opened on April 21, 1917 as Woodside, as part of an extension of the IRT Flushing Line. Following a period of neglect, it was renovated in the 2020s.

== History ==
=== Early history ===
The 1913 Dual Contracts called for the Interborough Rapid Transit Company (IRT) and Brooklyn Rapid Transit Company (BRT; later Brooklyn–Manhattan Transit Corporation, or BMT) to build new lines in Brooklyn, Queens, and the Bronx. Queens did not receive many new IRT and BRT lines compared to Brooklyn and the Bronx, since the city's Public Service Commission (PSC) wanted to alleviate subway crowding in the other two boroughs first before building in Queens, which was relatively undeveloped. The IRT Flushing Line was to be one of two Dual Contracts lines in the borough, along with the Astoria Line; it would connect Flushing and Long Island City, two of Queens's oldest settlements, to Manhattan via the Steinway Tunnel. When the majority of the line was built in the early 1910s, most of the route went through undeveloped land, and Roosevelt Avenue had not been constructed. Community leaders advocated for more Dual Contracts lines to be built in Queens to allow development there.

61st Street–Woodside opened on April 21, 1917 as Woodside, as part of an extension of the IRT Flushing Line to Alburtis Avenue (now 103rd Street–Corona Plaza). The Long Island Rail Road station predates the station, as it originally opened in 1869.

On February 29, 1928, five petitions signed with 600 names were sent to the New York State Transit Commission (NYSTC), requesting that an escalator be constructed at the station to the southeastern corner of 61st Street and Roosevelt Avenue. On July 25, the NYSTC ordered the Interborough Rapid Transit Company (IRT) to install a double-width escalator from the mezzanine to that corner, similar to one at the Third Avenue entrance at Grand Central station on the same line. The new escalator was placed into service on December 27, 1930.

=== Later years ===
The city government took over the IRT's operations on June 12, 1940. The IRT routes were given numbered designations in 1948 with the introduction of "R-type" rolling stock, which contained rollsigns with numbered designations for each service. The route from Times Square to Flushing became known as the 7. On October 17, 1949, the joint BMT/IRT operation of the Flushing Line ended, and the line became the responsibility of the IRT. After the end of BMT/IRT dual service, the New York City Board of Transportation announced that the Flushing Line platforms would be lengthened to 11 IRT car lengths; the platforms were only able to fit nine 51-foot-long IRT cars beforehand. The platforms at the station were extended in 1955–1956 to accommodate 11-car trains. However, nine-car trains continued to run on the 7 route until 1962, when they were extended to ten cars. With the opening of the 1964 New York World's Fair, trains were lengthened to eleven cars.

In 1981, the Metropolitan Transportation Authority (MTA) listed the station among the 69 most deteriorated stations in the subway system. Although the adjacent LIRR station was renovated in the 1990s, the subway station remained in poor shape. By the late 2010s, the 61st Street station was in poor condition; one newspaper reported that the station had issues with falling debris, rust, and peeling paint. The escalator leading up from 61st Street to the mezzanine, which had been installed around 2000, was one of the least reliable escalators in any subway station in Queens.

As part of the 2015–2019 Capital Program, the MTA announced plans to renovate the 52nd, 61st, 69th, 82nd, 103rd and 111th Streets stations, a project that had been delayed for several years. Conditions at these stations were reported to be among the worst of all stations in the subway system. Work on the 61st Street station would include ADA upgrades; track, staircase, and platform replacement; and structural and waterproofing improvements. Trains would continue serving Woodside in both directions throughout construction, with each track taken out of service in turn, though this meant express service on the Flushing line would be curtailed such that all trains would make all stops between Queensboro Plaza and 74th Street–Broadway. Construction began in June 2023, with work on the express track slated to be completed in January 2024. However, additional structural repairs caused completion of this work to be delayed until June 2025; the express track then reopened and work began on the Manhattan-bound platform and local track, shifting all station operations to the Flushing-bound platform. The work also included replacing 650 feet (200 m) of track. As of October 2025, escalator replacement and renovation of the Manhattan-bound platform were slated to be completed in early 2026, but this was later pushed back to May 2027. A detailed timeline for reinstatement of express service west of 74th Street has not yet been announced.

== Station layout ==
This station has two island platforms and three tracks. The two outer tracks are used for the full-time 7 local service while the bidirectional center track typically is used for rush hour peak-direction <7> express service, but as of June 2025 the Manhattan-bound local track is temporarily closed and all Manhattan-bound trains run on the center track. There is a mezzanine located at the center, underneath the platforms, with an ADA-accessible elevator to each platform, as well as another to each Long Island Rail Road platform. The elevator from the mezzanine to the street stops at the LIRR's eastbound Main Line platform.

The station is about 48 feet (15 m) above street level, and is located above a natural depression in ground level along Roosevelt Avenue.

Artwork includes John Cavanagh's Commuting/Community (1986), located near the stairway down to LIRR Track 4, and Dimitri Gerakaris's Woodside Continuum (1999), which forms part of the steel-grating fare-control separation.

=== Exits ===
Entrance and exit are provided by long stairs down to street level on the northern curb of Roosevelt Avenue at 61st Street, as well as to other nearby locations via the LIRR platforms. An ADA-compliant elevator provides access to street level at the northeast corner of 61st Street and Roosevelt Avenue, while a long escalator at the southeast corner provides entrance only. The Woodside station of the Long Island Rail Road is located directly beneath the Flushing Line station; any of the three LIRR platforms can be accessed directly from the mezzanine.
