= 7 (New York City Subway service) =

Rapid transit service

- Flushing Local; Flushing Express

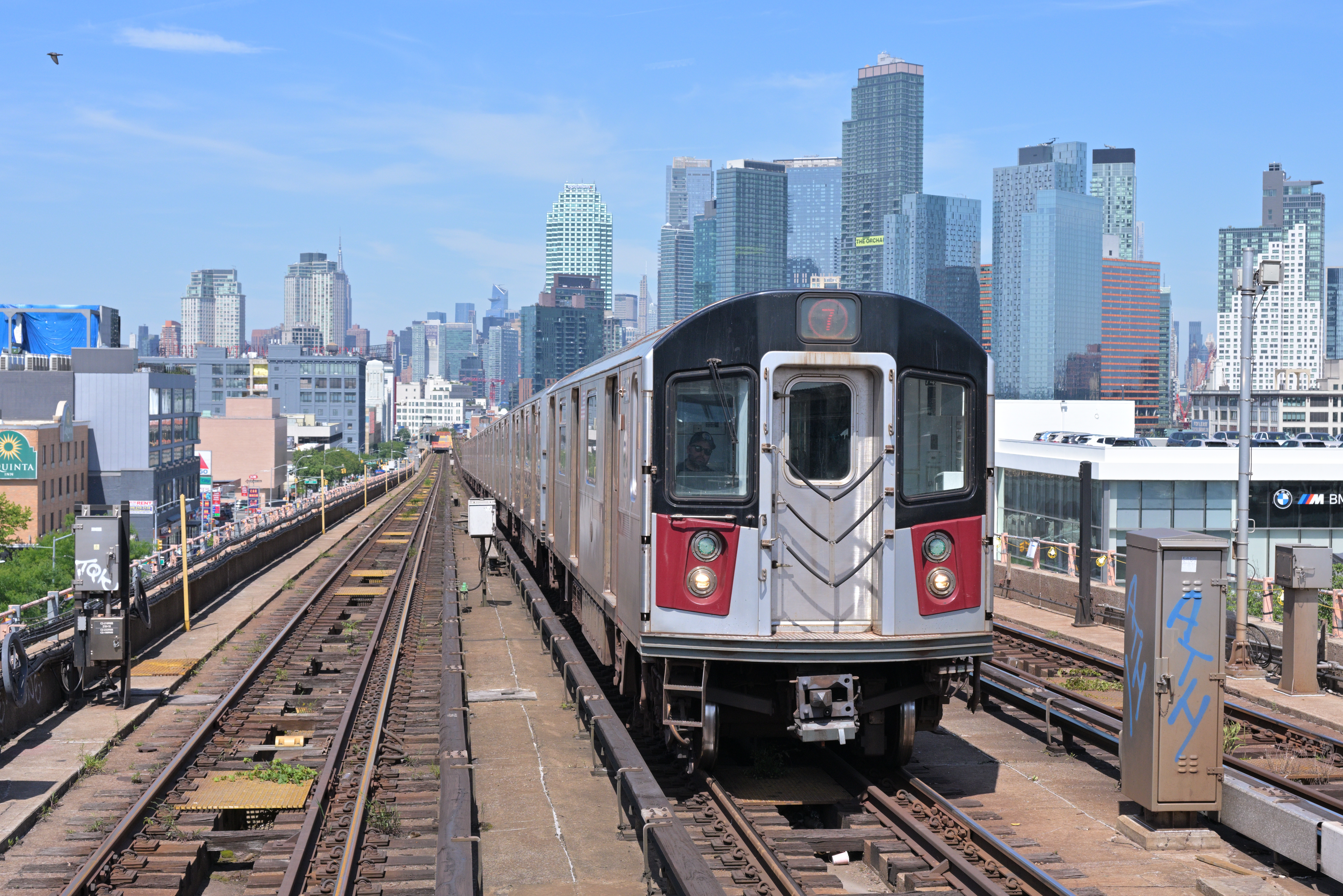
- Queens-bound 7 local train of R188s approaching 40th Street–Lowery Street station

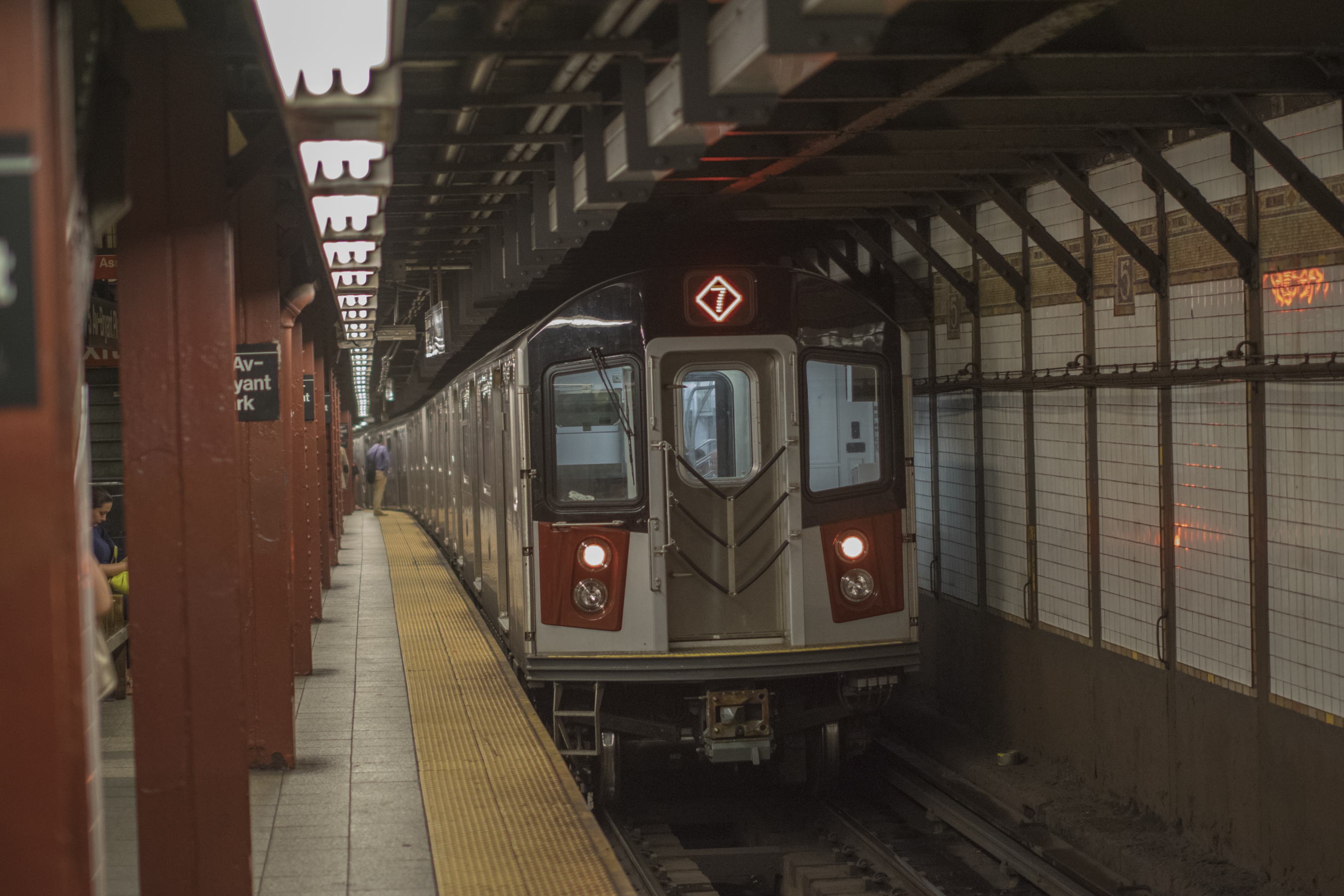
- Queens-bound 7 express train of R188s leaving Fifth Avenue

- Western end: 34th Street–Hudson Yards
- Eastern end: Flushing–Main Street
- Stations: 22 (local service); 18 (southbound express service); 15 (northbound express service); 8 (super express service) (Note: These figures include stations that are closed in one direction.)
- Rolling stock: R188 (Rolling stock assignments subject to change)
- Depot: Corona Yard
- Started service: 1915; 111 years ago

The 7 Flushing Local and <7> Flushing Express are two rapid transit services in the A Division of the New York City Subway, providing local and express services along the full length of the IRT Flushing Line. Their route emblems, or "bullets", are colored purple, since they serve the Flushing Line.

The 7 operates 24 hours daily between Main Street in Flushing, Queens and 34th Street–Hudson Yards in Chelsea, Manhattan, making all stops along the full route. Additional service operates along the full route and makes express stops in Queens between Mets–Willets Point and 74th Street–Broadway during rush hours in the peak direction instead of making all stops; these trains labeled as <7> Express trains. Super express service operates after special events at Citi Field or the USTA Billie Jean King National Tennis Center in the southbound direction only.

In normal service, <7> trains make express stops between Mets–Willets Point and Queensboro Plaza. The route started operations in 1915 when the Flushing Line opened. Since 1927, the 7 has held largely the same route, except for a one-stop western extension from Times Square to Hudson Yards on September 13, 2015.

== Service history ==
=== Early history ===
On June 13, 1915, the first test train on the IRT Flushing Line ran between Grand Central and Vernon Boulevard–Jackson Avenue, followed by the start of revenue service on June 22. The Flushing Line was extended one stop from Vernon–Jackson Avenue to Hunters Point Avenue on February 15, 1916. On November 5, 1916, the Flushing Line was extended two more stops east to the Queensboro Plaza station. The line was opened from Queensboro Plaza to Alburtis Avenue (now 103rd Street–Corona Plaza) on April 21, 1917. Service to 111th Street was inaugurated on October 13, 1925, with shuttle service running between 111th Street, and the previous terminal at Alburtis Avenue on the Manhattan-bound track.

On March 22, 1926, Flushing Line service was extended one stop westward from Grand Central to Fifth Avenue, when that portion of the Flushing Line was opened. The line was extended to Times Square almost exactly a year later, on March 14, 1927. Though an eastward extension to Willets Point Boulevard opened on May 7 of the same year, service was provided by shuttle trains for the first week, until through service was inaugurated. The eastern extension to Flushing–Main Street opened on January 21, 1928.

The service on the Flushing Line east of Queensboro Plaza was shared by the Interborough Rapid Transit Company (IRT) and the Brooklyn–Manhattan Transit Corporation (BMT) from 1912 to 1949; BMT trains were designated 9, while IRT services were designated 7 on maps only. The IRT routes were given numbered designations in 1948 with the introduction of "R-type" rolling stock, which contained rollsigns with numbered designations for each service. The Flushing route became known as the 7.

=== Introduction of express service ===
Express trains began running on April 24, 1939, to serve the 1939 New York World's Fair. The first train left Main Street at 6:30 a.m. local time. IRT expresses ran every nine minutes between Main Street and Times Square, with BMT expresses having a similar frequency, running just between Main Street and Queensboro Plaza. The running time between Main Street and Queensboro Plaza was 15 minutes and the running time between Main Street and Times Square was 27 minutes. Express service to Manhattan operated in the morning rush between 6:30 and 10:43 a.m. Express service to Main Street began from Times Square for the IRT at 10:50 a.m. and the BMT from Queensboro Plaza at 11:09 a.m., continuing until 8 p.m.

On October 17, 1949, the joint BMT/IRT operation of the Flushing Line ended, and the Flushing Line became the responsibility of the IRT. After the end of BMT/IRT dual service, the New York City Board of Transportation announced that the Flushing Line platforms would be lengthened to 11 IRT car lengths, and the BMT Astoria Line platforms extended to 10 BMT car lengths. The project, to start in 1950, would cost US$3,850,000 (equivalent to $51,500,000 in 2025). The platforms were only able to fit nine 51-foot-long IRT cars, or seven 60-foot-long BMT cars beforehand.

On March 12, 1953, two 9-car super express trains began operating from Flushing–Main Street to Times Square in the morning rush hour. The super expresses stopped at Willets Point before skipping all stops to Queensboro Plaza, bypassing the Woodside and Junction Boulevard express stops. The running time was cut down to 23 minutes from 25 minutes. Beginning August 12, 1955, four super expresses operated during the morning rush hour. On September 10, 1953, two express trains from Times Square were converted to super express trains in the evening rush hour. Super express service was discontinued in the morning rush and evening rush, on January 13, 1956, and December 14, 1956, respectively. Holiday and Saturday express service was discontinued on March 20, 1954.

On November 1, 1962, fifty R17s (numbers 6500–6549) were transferred from the Mainline IRT to the 7, allowing for ten-car operation. This was the first time that the IRT ran ten-car trains without a second conductor. With the 1964–1965 World's Fair in Flushing Meadows–Corona Park in April 1964, trains were lengthened to eleven cars. The Flushing Line received 430 new R33 and R36 "World's Fair" cars for this enhanced service.

=== Rehabilitation service patterns ===
==== First renovation ====
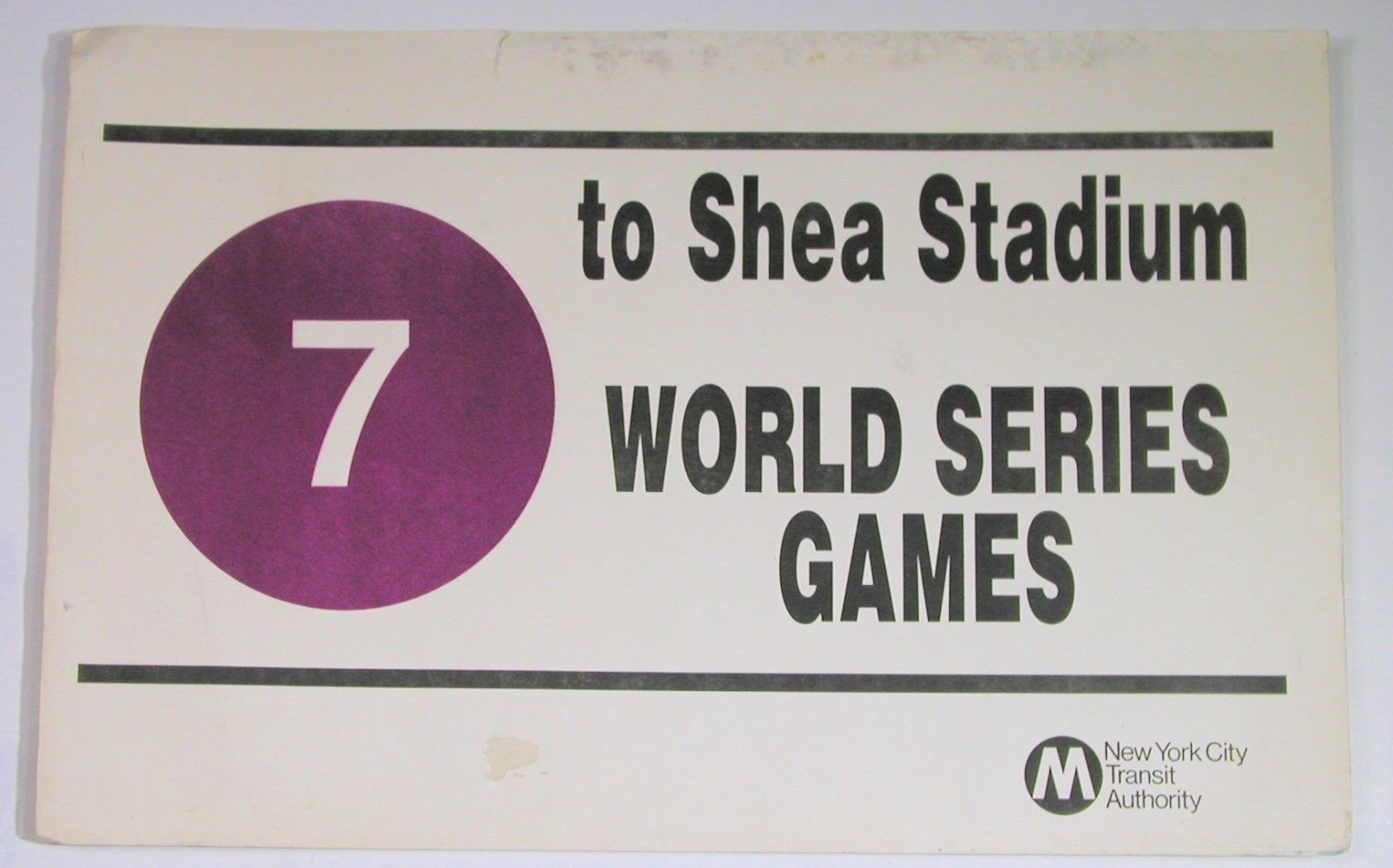
A poster used on 7 trains heading to Shea Stadium for the 1986 World Series, which the New York Mets won

From May 13, 1985, to August 21, 1989, the IRT Flushing Line was overhauled for improvements, including the installation of new track, repair of station structures and to improve line infrastructure. The project cost $70 million. Temporary platforms were built at local stations along the line when track work was being performed on local track in station areas to provide access to trains.

The major element was the replacement of rails on the Queens Boulevard viaduct. This was necessitated because the subway was allowed to deteriorate during the 1970s and 1980s to the point that there were widespread "Code Red" defects on the Flushing Line, and there were some pillars holding elevated structures that were so shaky that trains would not run if the wind exceeded 65 mph (105 km/h). <7> express service was suspended for the duration of the project; however, extra 7 service was provided for Mets games and Flushing Meadows Park events. During the project, delays of up to 10 minutes on weekdays, and 20 minutes on weekends were expected. The New York City Transit Authority (NYCTA) had considered running express bus service to replace <7> express service, but decided against it as it would require hundreds of buses, which the NYCTA did not have. During the construction project, the NYCTA operated 25 trains per hour on the local track, three fewer than the 28 trains per hour split between the local and express beforehand. Running times on the 7 were lengthened by ten minutes during the project.

==== Resumption of express service ====
The project was completed in June 1989, six months ahead of its scheduled completion of December 1989. The NYCTA held a public hearing on June 29, 1989, concerning its proposed reinstatement of express service. The NYCTA proposed implementing express service in July 1989 to coincide with changes in regular A Division schedules. It began to plan options to reinstate express service in 1988. Options were presented to local community boards, including the service pattern in place before May 1985, the continuation of all-local service, Super Express service running nonstop between Willets Point and Queensboro Plaza and Skip-Stop Express service.

Before May 1985, express service operated to Manhattan from 6:30 to 9:45 a.m. and to Main Street from 3:15 to 7:30 p.m. Expresses ran every three minutes on average and locals ran every six minutes; due to the uneven split in service, in practice one express train would be followed two minutes later by another express train, and then an additional four minutes would elapse until the next express train arrived. This split between expresses and locals was in place due to high demand for express trains. Express trains that arrived four minutes after the previous trip had carried twice as many passengers than the expresses that arrived two minutes afterward. With the elimination of express service and the unreliable merge at 33rd Street, service reliability had increased, with on-time performance often exceeding 95%. Keeping local-only service was dismissed as it would not have saved times for the large number of riders boarding east of Junction Boulevard heading to Manhattan, because it did not provide for the most efficient use of subway cars, and because it did not provide an attractive alternative to the overcrowded Queens Boulevard Line. Super express service was dismissed as the demand for local service would require two or three locals for every express, replicating the problem of the pre-1985 service pattern. Skip-stop service was dismissed for limiting the capacity of the line to 24 trains per hour, from the line's capacity of 30 trains per hour under other service patterns for express service.

The NYCTA created a service plan with the goals of maintaining existing levels of reliability, having local service run at existing levels or higher than the pre-1985 level, and providing faster running times. The NYCTA proposed the reintroduction of express service, running to Manhattan between 6:30 and 10 a.m. (changed to 6:30 to 9:45 a.m. at the time of implementation) and to Flushing between 3:15 and 8:15 p.m.. Express service would bypass 61st Street–Woodside, allowing one express train to run for every local, with expresses and locals both running every four minutes. The operation of expresses and locals at even frequencies was expected to aid in the even spacing of trains arriving at 33rd Street. The fast express service was expected to discourage riders boarding north of Junction Boulevard to transfer to the crowded Queens Boulevard Line. The elimination of Woodside as an express stop was done in part because trains at the station would be held up by passengers transferring between the local and the express, which led to delays at the 33rd Street merge, negating the time savings. On July 28, 1989, the Metropolitan Transportation Authority (MTA) Board approved the change by a vote of 5–3. <7> express service was restored on August 21, 1989, pushed back from July. Express service saved six minutes from Main Street to Manhattan and four minutes from Junction Boulevard. In September 1989, 200 riders and Republican Mayoral candidate Rudolph Giuliani rallied at the 61st Street station to protest the elimination of express service. Express service resumed stopping at Woodside on a six-week test basis on February 10, 1992, after pressure from community opposition.

==== Second renovation ====
In the mid-1990s, the MTA discovered that the Queens Boulevard viaduct structure was unstable, as rocks that were used to support the tracks as ballast became loose due to poor drainage, which, in turn, affected the integrity of the concrete structure overall. <7> express service was suspended again between 61st Street–Woodside and Queensboro Plaza; temporary platforms were installed to access the express track in the four intermediate stations. The work began on April 5, 1993. When the viaduct reconstruction finished on March 31, 1997, ahead of schedule, full <7> express service was reinstated. Throughout this entire period, ridership grew steadily. On November 6, 2000, express service was extended from 9 p.m. to 10 p.m..

=== Extension and CBTC ===
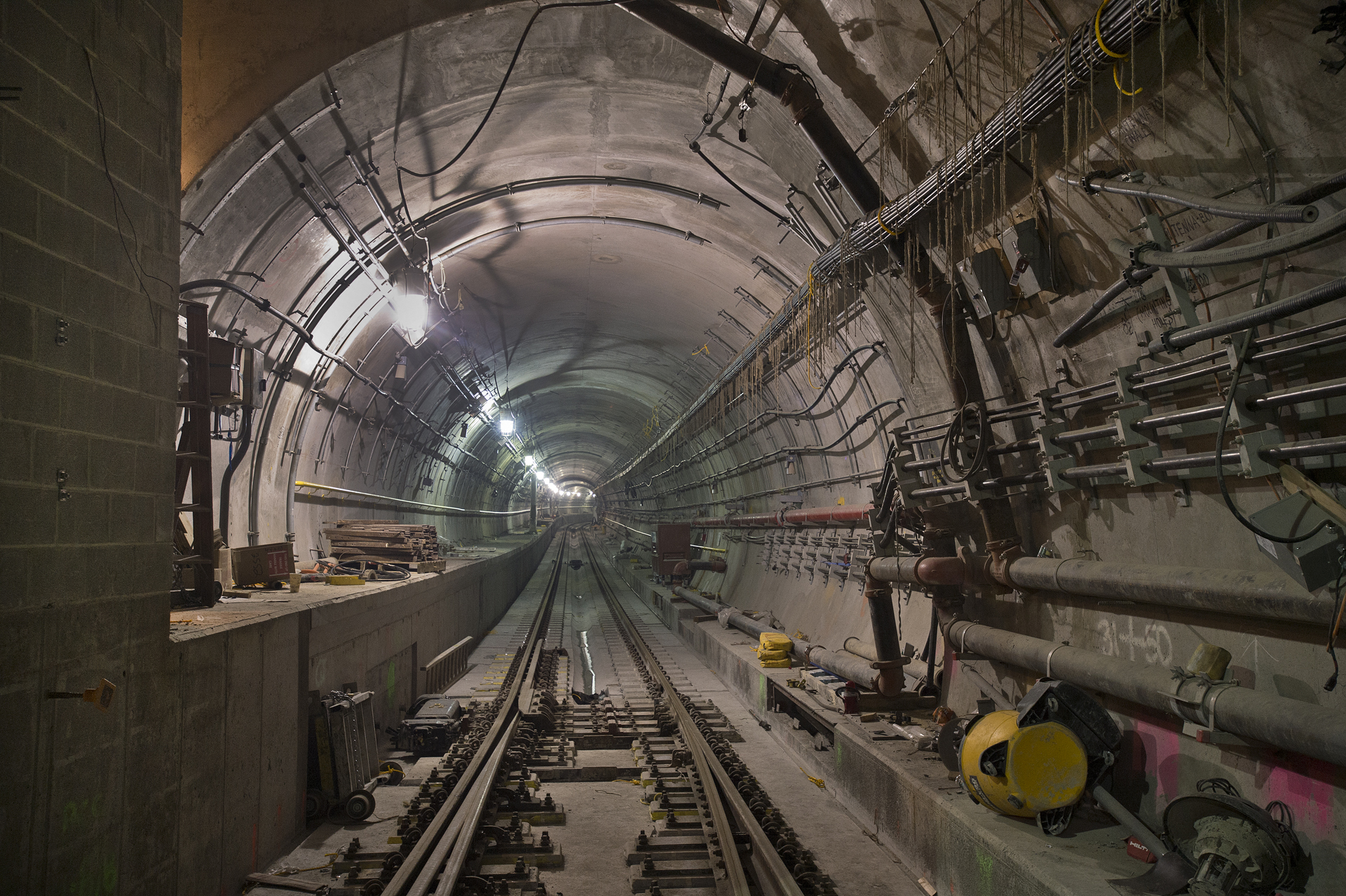
A tunnel segment of the 7 Subway Extension during construction; it opened for service on September 13, 2015.

The 7 Subway Extension, which travels west and south to 34th Street and 11th Avenue, near the Jacob K. Javits Convention Center in Hudson Yards, was delayed five times. The 34th Street–Hudson Yards station, originally scheduled to open in December 2013, then pushed to May 2014. And then pushed again to September 13, 2015, and has been serving passengers ever since. However, the overall station construction project was not completed until early September 2018.

In 2010, New York City officials announced they were considering a further extension of the service across the Hudson River to the Secaucus Junction train station in New Jersey. Though the project was supported by New York City mayor Michael Bloomberg and New Jersey governor Chris Christie, MTA chairman Joseph Lhota announced in 2013 that the New Jersey extension would not be pursued, in favor of the Gateway Tunnel project, which entails a new tunnel to Manhattan for Amtrak and NJ Transit trains. As part of a joint effort between the Port Authority of New York and New Jersey, the MTA, and NJ Transit, this extension was considered again in February 2018.

In 2008, the MTA started converting the 7 service to accommodate communications-based train control (CBTC). Originally expected to cost $585.9 million, the installation of CBTC was intended to allow two additional trains per hour as well as two additional trains for the 7 Subway Extension, providing a 7% increase in capacity. At the former southern terminal, Times Square, service on the 7 was limited to 27 trains per hour as a result of the bumper blocks there. The new southern terminal at 34th Street–Hudson Yards has tail tracks to store rush-hour trains and can increase the service frequency to 29 trains per hour. New CBTC-compatible cars for the A Division (the R188 contract) were delivered from 2013 to 2016. In October 2017, the CBTC system was activated from Main Street to 74th Street. On November 26, 2018, following numerous delays, CBTC was activated on the remainder of the 7 route.

From June 26, 2023, until 2026, <7> express trains are making all stops between Queensboro Plaza and 74th Street–Broadway due to renovations along the Flushing Line.

== Fleet ==
The 7 operates with 11-car sets; the number of cars in a single 7 train set is more than in any other New York City Subway service. These trains, however, are not the longest in the system, since a train of 11 "A" Division cars is only 565 feet (172 m) long, while a standard B Division train, which consists of ten 60 foot (18 m) cars or eight 75 foot (23 m) cars, is 600 feet (180 m) long.

=== Fleet history ===
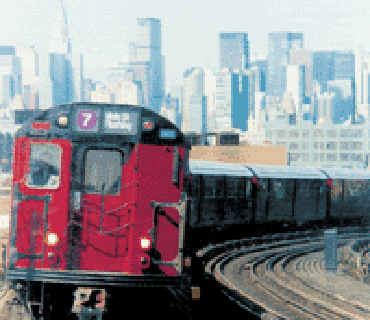
An R33S/R36 7 train at 33rd Street–Rawson Street

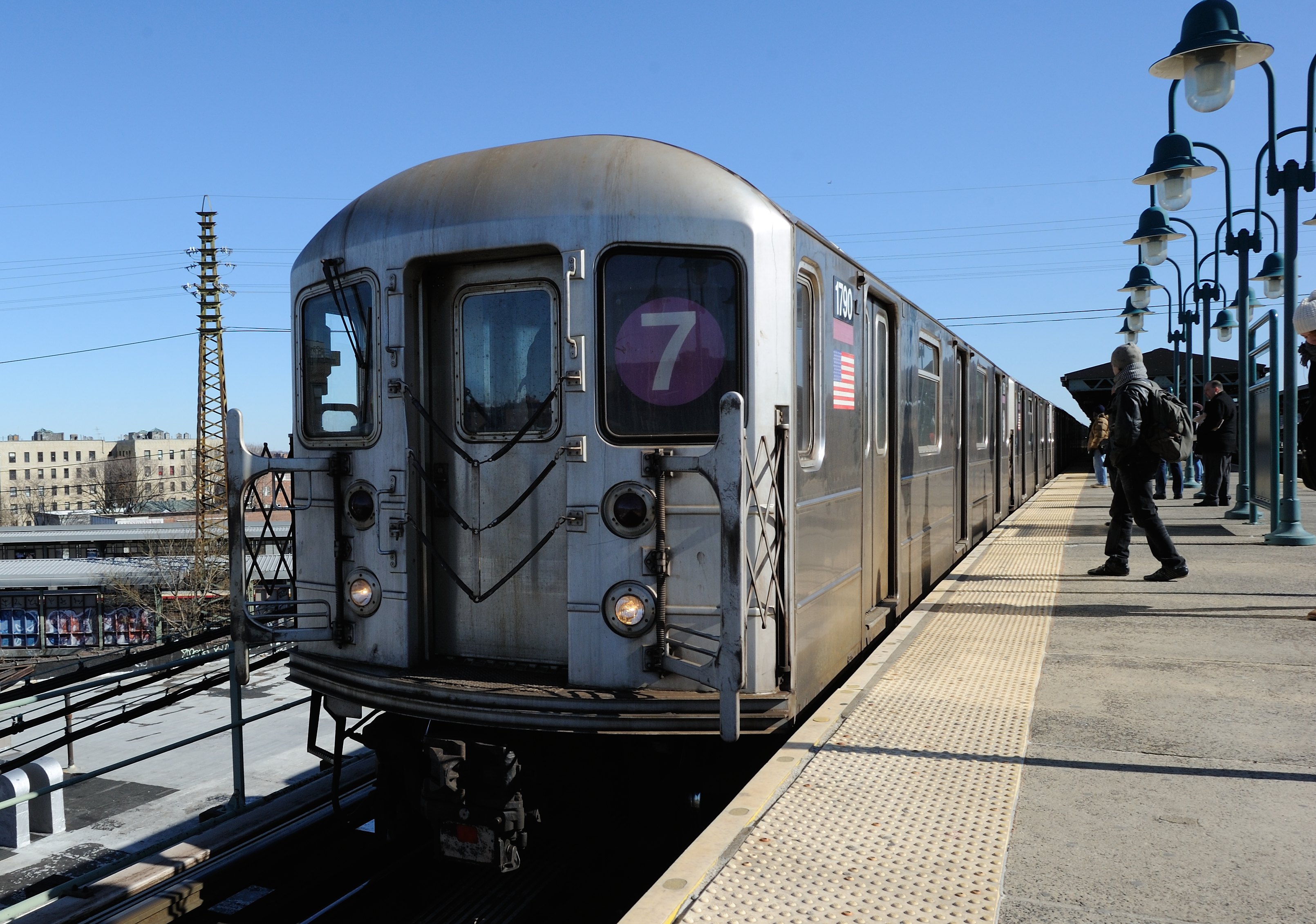
An R62A 7 train at 61st Street-Woodside

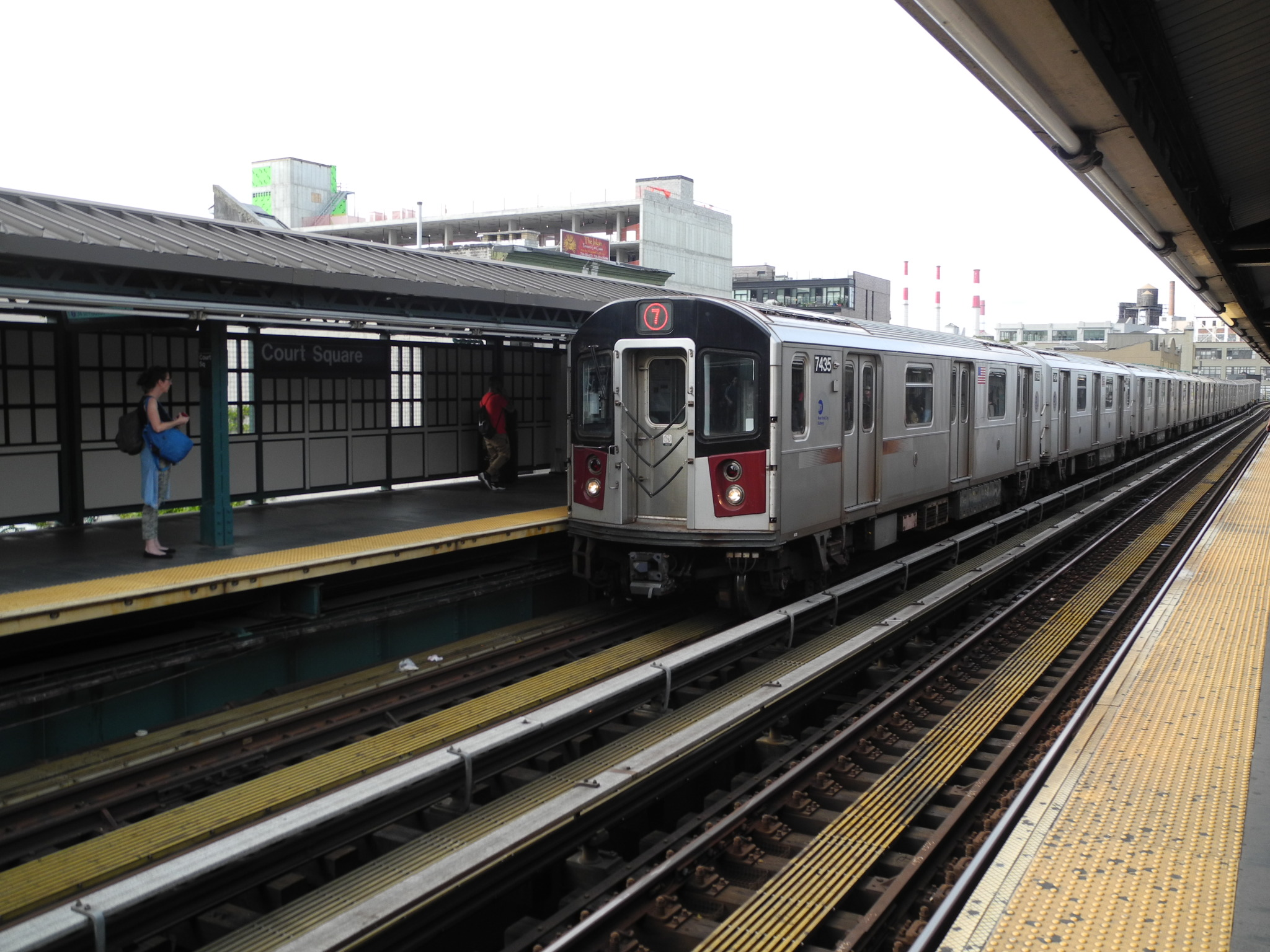
An R188 7 train entering Court Square

The 7, throughout almost all its history, has maintained a separate fleet from the rest of the IRT, starting with the Steinway Low-Vs. The Steinways were built between 1915 and 1925 specifically for use in the Steinway Tunnel. They had special gear ratios to climb the steep grades (4.5%) in the Steinway Tunnel, something standard Interborough equipment could not do.

In 1938, an order of World's Fair Lo-V cars was placed with the St. Louis Car Company. These cars broke from IRT "tradition" in that they did not have vestibules at each car end. In addition, because the IRT was bankrupt at the time, the cars were built as single ended cars, with train controls for the motorman on one side and door controls for the conductor on the other.

Starting in 1948, R12s, R14s, and R15s were delivered to the 7. On November 1, 1962, fifty R17s (6500–6549) were transferred from the Mainline IRT to the 7, allowing for ten-car operation. This was the first time that the IRT ran ten-car trains without a second conductor.

In 1964, picture window R33S and R36 cars replaced the older R12s, R14s, R15s, and R17s in time for the 1964 New York World's Fair. Early in 1965, the NYCTA placed a strip map indicating all the stations and transfer points for the 7 in each of its 430 cars, helping World's Fair visitors. This innovation was not used for other services and as they shared rolling stock with each other; it was possible for cars to have the wrong strip maps.

The 7 was the last route to run using "Redbird" cars, and the 7's fleet consisted entirely of R33S/R36 Redbird trains until February 2002. In 2001, with the arrival of the R142/R142A cars, the Transit Authority announced the retirement of all Redbird cars. From January 2002 to November 2003, Bombardier-built R62A cars from other routes gradually replaced all of the Redbird cars on the 7. The first R62As entered service on the 7 route on February 19, 2002. On November 3, 2003, the last Redbird train made its final trip on this route, making all stops between Times Square and the then-named Willets Point–Shea Stadium. Several Redbird cars running on this service were decorated with Mets logos and colors during the 2000 World Series against the New York Yankees, as the Flushing Line runs adjacent to Citi Field and the former location of Shea Stadium.

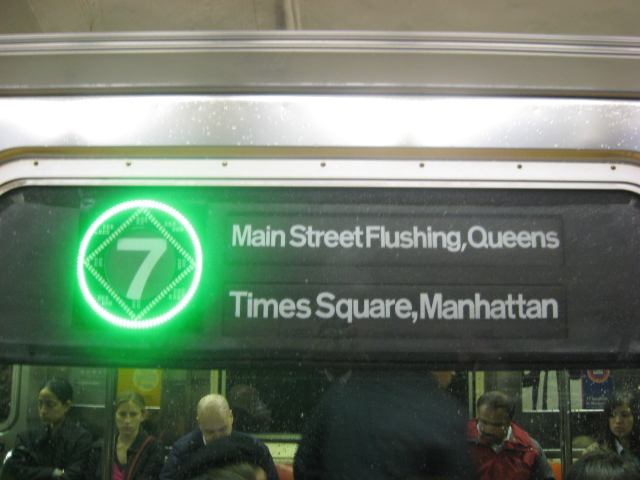
Green circle denotes a local train

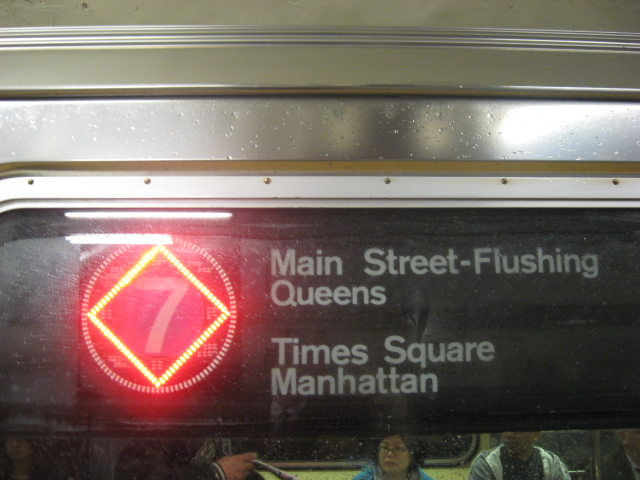
Red diamond denotes a express train

By 2008, all R62As on the 7 were upgraded with LED lighted signs to distinguish between express and local trains. These signs are located on the rollsigns that are found on the side of each car. The local is a green circle around the 7 bullet while the express is a red diamond. Previously, the rollsigns showed either a (7) (within a circle) or a <7> (within a diamond) with the word "Express" underneath it.

The R62As were displaced by the R188s from January 2014 to March 30, 2018, in preparation for the automation equipment for the Flushing Line. The displaced R62As were returned to the 6 train, from which many R142As were taken and converted to R188s. The first train of R188 cars began operating in passenger service on November 9, 2013. By 2016, most of the CBTC-equipped R188 train sets were on the 7, and by March 30, 2018, the last R62A trains were displaced by the R188 cars. Eleven of the R188 cars have green circle/red diamond LED signs and a LED numbered-route display, similar to those on the R62As that formerly operated on the 7 route.

== Nickname ==
The 7 is unofficially nicknamed the "International Express" and the "Orient Express", in part because it travels through several different ethnic neighborhoods populated by immigrants, especially along Roosevelt Avenue, and also because it was the principal subway route to the 1964–65 New York World's Fair. On June 26, 1999, First Lady Hillary Clinton and U.S. Transportation Secretary Rodney E. Slater designated the 7 route as a National Millennium Trail (under the name "International Express"), along with 15 other routes including the Lewis and Clark National Historic Trail and the Underground Railroad.

== Route ==
=== Signage history ===
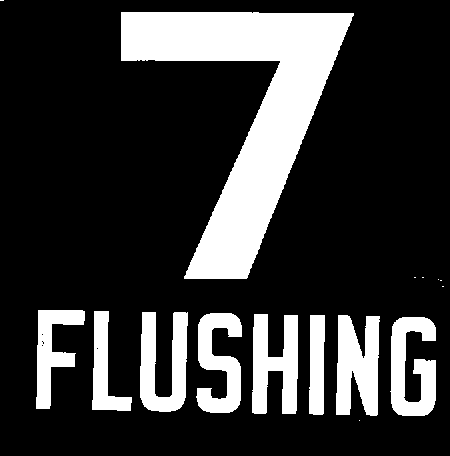
Pre-1967 bullet used on the R12s to R36s

1967–1979 bullet

The local bullet used since 1979

The express bullet currently used

=== Service pattern ===
The following table shows the line used by the 7 and <7>, with shaded boxes indicating the route at the specified times:

| Line | From | To | Tracks | Times | |
| Line | From | To | Tracks | 7 service | 7 diamond service |
| Line | From | To | Tracks | all times | rush hours, peak direction |
|---|---|---|---|---|---|
| IRT Flushing Line (full line) | Flushing–Main Street | 74th Street–Broadway | express | | |
| IRT Flushing Line (full line) | Flushing–Main Street | 74th Street–Broadway | local | | |
| IRT Flushing Line (full line) | 74th Street–Broadway | 33rd Street–Rawson Street | local | | |
| IRT Flushing Line (full line) | Queensboro Plaza | 34th Street–Hudson Yards | all | | |

<7> trains typically run express east of Queensboro Plaza. As of June 2023, due to structural renovations on the IRT Flushing Line, <7> trains only run express east of 74th Street–Broadway.

In addition to regular local and rush-hour express services, "Super Express" service to Manhattan is also provided after New York Mets games weeknights and weekends at Citi Field, as well as after US Open tennis matches. The Super Express trains start at Mets–Willets Point and operate express to Manhattan, also bypassing Junction Boulevard, Hunters Point Avenue and Vernon Boulevard–Jackson Avenue. As of 2023, Super Express trains only bypass Hunters Point Avenue and Vernon Boulevard–Jackson Avenue due to work on the IRT Flushing Line.

=== Stations ===
The 7 and <7> run on the IRT Flushing Line in their entirety. Stations in blue denote stops served by Super Express game specials. In case of severe winter weather, all <7> service is suspended.

Station service legend
| Stops all times | Stops 24 hours a day |
| Stops all times except late nights | Stops every day during daytime hours only |
| Stops weekdays during the day | Stops during weekday daytime hours only |
| Stops rush hours in the peak direction only | Stops during weekday rush hours in the peak direction only |
| Station closed | Station closed |
Time period details
| Disabled access | Station is compliant with the Americans with Disabilities Act |
| ↑ | Station is compliant with the Americans with Disabilities Act in the indicated direction only |
| ↓ | Station is compliant with the Americans with Disabilities Act in the indicated direction only |
| | Elevator access to mezzanine only |

| Lcl | Exp | Stations | Disabled access | Subway transfers | Connections/Notes |
|---|---|---|---|---|---|
Queens
Flushing Line
| Stops all times | Stops rush hours in the peak direction only | Flushing–Main Street | Disabled access | | LIRR Port Washington Branch at Flushing–Main Street; Q44 Select Bus Service; Q90 bus to LaGuardia Airport (Terminals C and B only). |
| Stops all times | Stops rush hours in the peak direction only | Mets–Willets Point | ↑ (Note: Only the Flushing-bound local side platform is wheelchair-accessible. Trains open on this platform only during New York Mets games, the US Open, and other special events.) | | LIRR Port Washington Branch at Mets–Willets Point; Some rush hour trips originate or terminate at this station (Note: During the morning, trips may both begin and end at Mets–Willets Point, but during the evening, trips may only end at this station.); Super Express trips to 34th Street–Hudson Yards originate at this station. |
| Stops all times | | | 111th Street | | | Some southbound rush hour trips originate at this station. |
| Stops all times | | | 103rd Street–Corona Plaza | | | |
| Stops all times | Stops rush hours in the peak direction only | Junction Boulevard | Disabled access | | Q72 bus to LaGuardia Airport (Terminals C and B only). |
| Stops all times | | | 90th Street–Elmhurst Avenue | | | |
| Stops all times | | | 82nd Street–Jackson Heights | | | Q33 bus to LaGuardia Airport (Marine Air Terminal only). |
| Stops all times | ↓ | 74th Street–Broadway | Disabled access | E F <F> M R (IND Queens Boulevard Line at Jackson Heights–Roosevelt Avenue) | Q33 bus to LaGuardia Airport (Marine Air Terminal only); Q53 Select Bus Service; Q70 Select Bus Service to LaGuardia Airport (Terminals C and B only). |
| ↓ | ↓ | 69th Street | | | Flushing-bound trains do not stop here because of renovations until 2027. |
| Stops all times | Stops rush hours in the peak direction only | 61st Street–Woodside | Disabled access | | LIRR City Terminal Zone at Woodside; Q53 Select Bus Service; Q70 Select Bus Service to LaGuardia Airport (Terminals C and B only). All trains stop at this station by opening their doors on the Manhattan-bound platform. |
| ↓ | ↓ | 52nd Street | | | Flushing-bound trains do not stop here because of renovations until 2027. |
| Stops all times | Stops rush hours in the peak direction only | 46th Street–Bliss Street | | | All Flushing-bound trains stop at this station on the express track by opening their doors on the extended northbound platform. |
| Stops all times | Stops rush hours in the peak direction only | 40th Street–Lowery Street | | | All Flushing-bound trains stop at this station on the express track by opening their doors on the extended northbound platform. |
| Stops all times | Stops rush hours in the peak direction only | 33rd Street–Rawson Street | | | All Flushing-bound trains stop at this station on the express track by opening their doors on the extended northbound platform. |
| Stops all times | Stops rush hours in the peak direction only | Queensboro Plaza | Disabled access | N W (BMT Astoria Line) | |
| Stops all times | Stops rush hours in the peak direction only | Court Square | Disabled access | G (IND Crosstown Line); E F <F> (IND Queens Boulevard Line at Court Square–23rd Street) | |
| Stops all times | Stops rush hours in the peak direction only | Hunters Point Avenue | | | LIRR City Terminal Zone at Hunterspoint Avenue (peak hours only) |
| Stops all times | Stops rush hours in the peak direction only | Vernon Boulevard–Jackson Avenue | | | LIRR City Terminal Zone at Long Island City (peak hours only) |
Manhattan
| Stops all times | Stops rush hours in the peak direction only | Grand Central–42nd Street | Disabled access | 4 5 6 <6> (IRT Lexington Avenue Line); S (42nd Street Shuttle) | Metro-North Railroad at Grand Central Terminal; Long Island Rail Road at Grand Central Madison |
| Stops all times | Stops rush hours in the peak direction only | Fifth Avenue | Elevator access to mezzanine only | B D F <F> M (IND Sixth Avenue Line at 42nd Street–Bryant Park) | |
| Stops all times | Stops rush hours in the peak direction only | Times Square–42nd Street | Disabled access | 1 2 3 (IRT Broadway–Seventh Avenue Line); A C E (IND Eighth Avenue Line at 42nd Street–Port Authority Bus Terminal); N Q R W (BMT Broadway Line); S (42nd Street Shuttle) | Port Authority Bus Terminal; M34A Select Bus Service |
| Stops all times | Stops rush hours in the peak direction only | 34th Street–Hudson Yards | Disabled access | | M34 Select Bus Service |

== In popular culture ==
- The 2000 documentary film The #7 Train: An Immigrant Journey is based on the ethnic diversity of the people that ride the 7 train every day.
- The 7 Line Army is a group of New York Mets fans whose name is derived from the 7 route.
- In a 1999 Sports Illustrated interview, then-Atlanta Braves pitcher John Rocker controversially stated that riding the 7 train is "like you're [riding through] Beirut next to some kid with purple hair next to some queer with AIDS right next to some dude who just got out of jail for the fourth time right next to some 20-year-old mom with four kids. It's depressing. The biggest thing I don't like about New York are the foreigners. You can walk an entire block in Times Square and not hear anybody speaking English. Asians and Koreans and Vietnamese and Indians and Russians and Spanish people and everything up there. How the hell did they get in this country?"
- The PC simulator game World of Subways 4, released in March 2015 by Aerosoft, is a recreation of the 7 during the time the redbirds operated the service. It features a driving simulation in various conditions, as well as missions with storylines loosely related to the 7's operation.
- In January 2020, as part of an agreement between the MTA and Comedy Central to promote the TV show Nora From Queens, the default pre-recorded announcements for the 7 train on the R188s were replaced with those from Awkwafina for one week. The announcements from Awkwafina featured jokes in addition to the standard station announcements. The agreement was the first time that the MTA had replaced train announcements as a form of advertising.
- In September 2022, New York Mets television broadcast announcers Ron Darling, Keith Hernandez, and Gary Cohen pre-recorded announcements along the 7 service.
- In April 2024, the Mets unveiled their City Connect uniforms, which allude to the 7 service through their use of the color purple.
- On October 8, 2024, the McDonald's mascot Grimace rode a 7 train branded with imagery featuring the character before Game 3 of the 2024 National League Division Series between the Mets and the Philadelphia Phillies.
