= Junction Boulevard station =

New York City Subway station in Queens

Junction Blvd
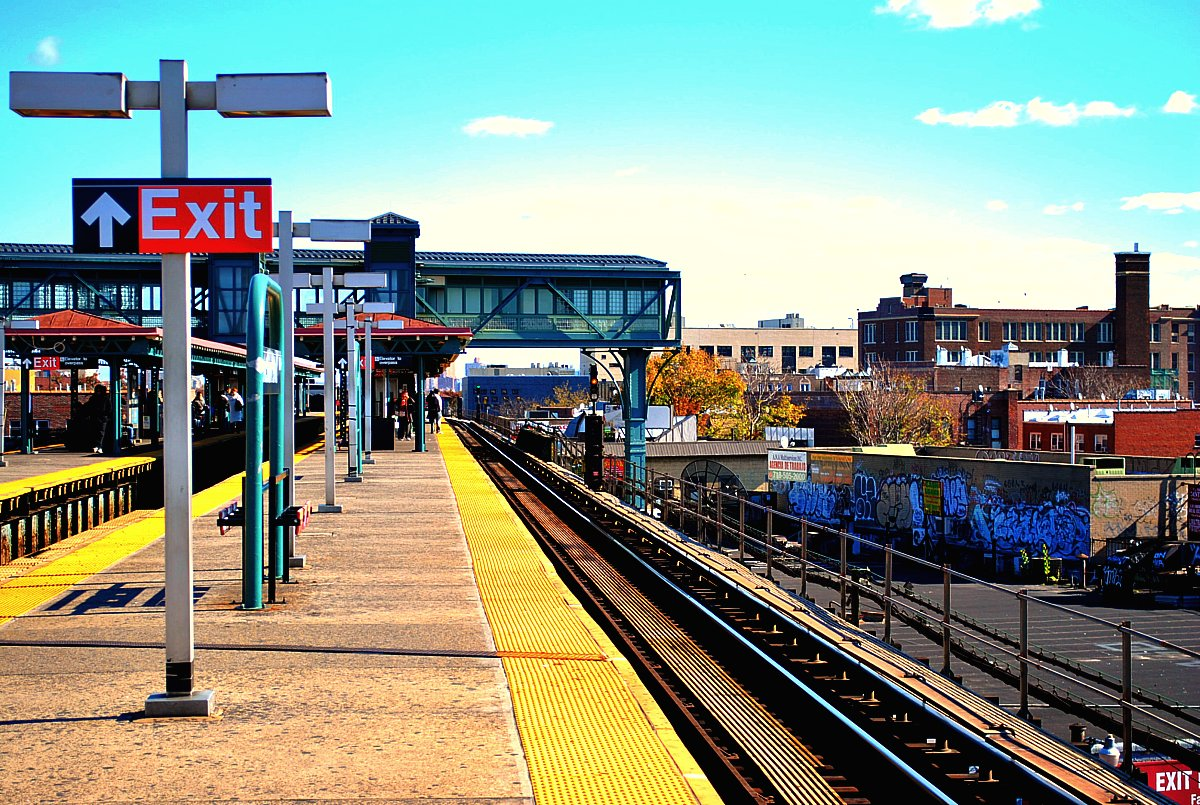
- View from the northbound platform

Station statistics
- Address: Junction Boulevard & Roosevelt Avenue; Queens, New York
- Borough: Queens
- Locale: Corona, Elmhurst, Jackson Heights
- Coordinates: 40°44′57.03″N 73°52′8.75″W
- Division: A (IRT)
- Line: IRT Flushing Line
- Services: 7 (all times) <7> (rush hours until 9:30 p.m., peak direction)
- Transit: MTA Bus: Q72
- Structure: Elevated
- Platforms: 2 island platforms cross-platform interchange
- Tracks: 3

Other information
- Opened: April 21, 1917; 109 years ago
- Accessible: Yes
- Former/other names: Junction Avenue (1917-1940)

Traffic
- 2025: 6,752,059 ▲2.4%
- Rank: 33 out of 423
Services
Preceding station	New York City Subway	Following station
61st Street–Woodside <7> toward 34th Street–Hudson Yards	Express	Mets–Willets Point <7> toward Flushing–Main Street
90th Street–Elmhurst Avenue 7 toward 34th Street–Hudson Yards	Local	103rd Street–Corona Plaza 7 toward Flushing–Main Street
Location
Location within New York City Subway
Location within New York City
Location within New York
Track layout
Street map
Station service legend
Symbol	Description
Stops all times	Stops all times
Stops rush hours in the peak direction only	Stops rush hours in the peak direction only

The Junction Boulevard station (originally Junction Avenue station) is an express station on the IRT Flushing Line of the New York City Subway. The station is located at the intersection of Junction Boulevard and Roosevelt Avenue on the borders of Corona, Elmhurst, and Jackson Heights in Queens. It is served by the 7 train at all times and by rush hour peak-direction <7> express service.

== History ==
=== Early history ===
The 1913 Dual Contracts called for the Interborough Rapid Transit Company (IRT) and Brooklyn Rapid Transit Company (BRT; later Brooklyn–Manhattan Transit Corporation, or BMT) to build new lines in Brooklyn, Queens, and the Bronx. Queens did not receive many new IRT and BRT lines compared to Brooklyn and the Bronx, since the city's Public Service Commission (PSC) wanted to alleviate subway crowding in the other two boroughs first before building in Queens, which was relatively undeveloped. The IRT Flushing Line was to be one of two Dual Contracts lines in the borough, along with the Astoria Line; it would connect Flushing and Long Island City, two of Queens's oldest settlements, to Manhattan via the Steinway Tunnel. When the majority of the line was built in the early 1910s, most of the route went through undeveloped land, and Roosevelt Avenue had not been constructed. Community leaders advocated for more Dual Contracts lines to be built in Queens to allow development there.

This elevated station opened on April 21, 1917, as Junction Avenue, as part of a large extension of the Flushing Line from its previous eastern terminus at Queensboro Plaza to Alburtis Avenue (now 103rd Street–Corona Plaza). It was part of the Brooklyn–Manhattan Transit Corporation, albeit served by shuttles of IRT dimensions, and the two companies jointly operated the Flushing and Astoria Lines due to the provisions of the Dual Contracts. The station was renamed Junction Boulevard in 1940.

=== Later years ===
The city government took over the IRT's operations on June 12, 1940. The IRT routes were given numbered designations in 1948 with the introduction of "R-type" rolling stock, which contained rollsigns with numbered designations for each service. The route from Times Square to Flushing became known as the 7. On October 17, 1949, the joint BMT/IRT operation of the Flushing Line ended, and the line became the responsibility of the IRT. After the end of BMT/IRT dual service, the New York City Board of Transportation announced that the Flushing Line platforms would be lengthened to 11 IRT car lengths; the platforms were only able to fit nine 51-foot-long IRT cars beforehand. The platforms at the station were extended in 1955–1956 to accommodate 11-car trains. However, nine-car trains continued to run on the 7 route until 1962, when they were extended to ten cars. With the opening of the 1964 New York World's Fair, trains were lengthened to eleven cars.

In 1981, the Metropolitan Transportation Authority listed the station among the 69 most deteriorated stations in the subway system. A renovation of the Junction Boulevard station was funded as part of the MTA's 1980–1984 capital plan. The MTA received a $106 million grant from the Urban Mass Transit Administration in October 1983; most of the grant would fund the renovation of eleven stations, including Junction Boulevard.

== Station layout ==
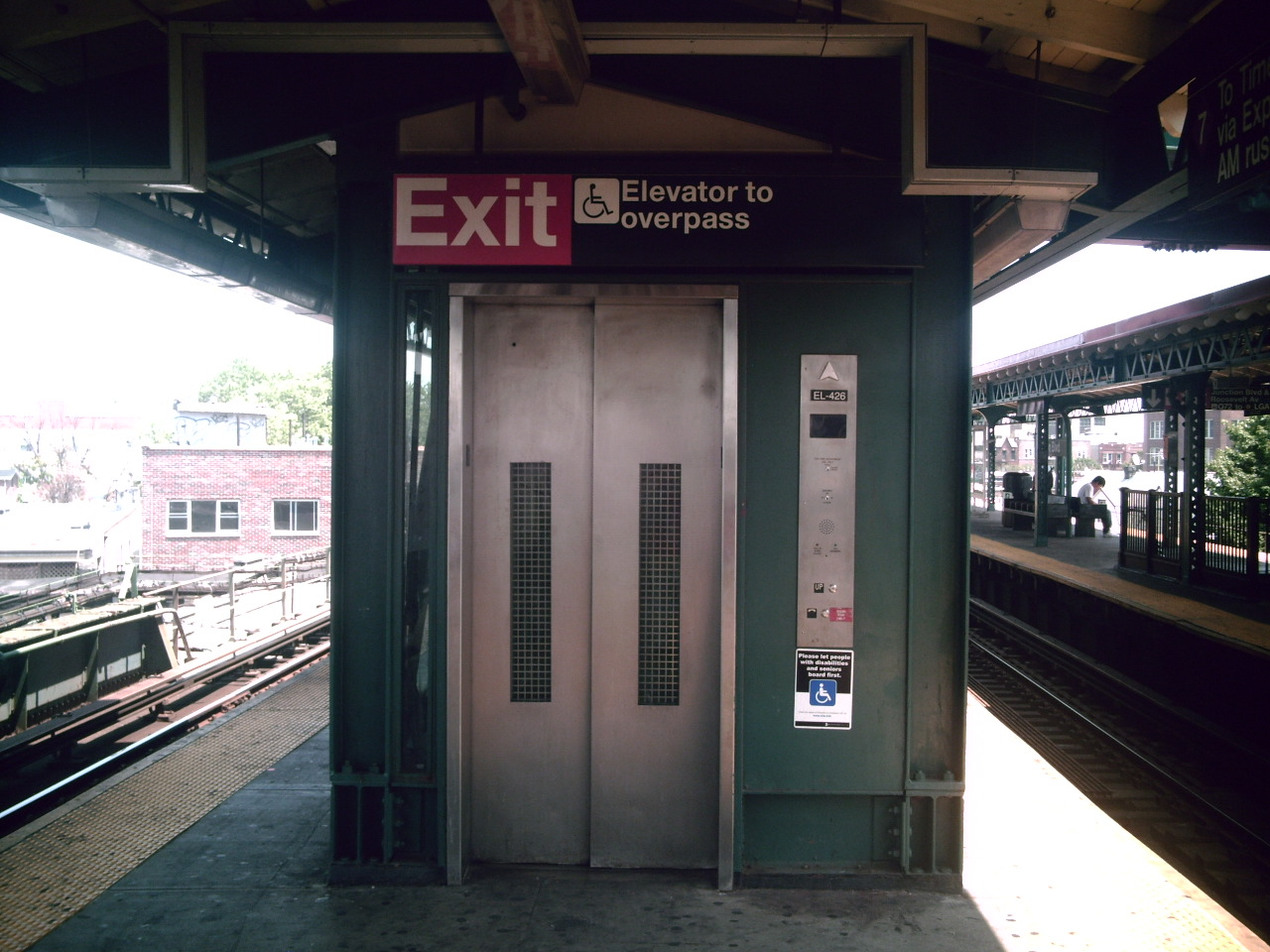
Elevator from platform

This station has two island platforms and three tracks. The two outer local tracks are used by the full-time 7 local service while the middle express track is used by the rush-hour peak direction <7> express service. Both platforms have red canopies with green frames and support columns in the center and are narrower at either ends.

=== Exits ===
This station has one elevated station house beneath the platforms tracks. Four staircases from each corner of Junction Boulevard and Roosevelt Avenue go up to a mezzanine that has a token booth in the center and a turnstile bank on the east and west sides. These turnstile banks lead to a crossunder and has a single staircase going up to each platform towards the west (railroad south) end.

This station was made ADA accessible in 2007, at the cost of $6 million. From the northeast corner of the intersection this station is located at, a single elevator goes up to an enclosed overpass above the platforms with an intermediate stop at the mezzanine. The overpass has two HEET turnstiles and a gate that is automatically opened when OMNY is tapped at either turnstile. Inside, two elevators go down to the platforms, one for each. Previously, an "AutoGate" Reduced-fare MetroCard was required to open the gate. An emergency staircase goes down to the Manhattan-bound platform and an employee-facility is on the Flushing-bound end of the overpass.
