= 103rd Street–Corona Plaza station =

New York City Subway station in Queens

103 Street–Corona Plaza
- Platform view

Station statistics
- Address: 103rd Street & Roosevelt Avenue; Queens, New York
- Borough: Queens
- Locale: Corona
- Coordinates: 40°44′59.37″N 73°51′45.84″W
- Division: A (IRT)
- Line: IRT Flushing Line
- Services: 7 (all times)
- Transit: NYCT Bus: Q14
- Structure: Elevated
- Platforms: 2 side platforms
- Tracks: 3

Other information
- Opened: April 21, 1917; 109 years ago
- Accessible: No; planned
- Former/other names: Alburtis Avenue; 104th Street

Traffic
- 2025: 5,595,189 ▼12%
- Rank: 51 out of 423
Services
| Preceding station | New York City Subway | Following station |
|---|---|---|
| Junction Boulevard toward 34th Street–Hudson Yards | Local | 111th Street toward Flushing–Main Street |
does not stop here
Location
Location within New York City Subway
Location within New York City
Location within New York
Track layout
Street map
Station service legend
| Symbol | Description |
| Stops all times | Stops all times |

The 103rd Street–Corona Plaza station is a local station on the IRT Flushing Line of the New York City Subway, located at the intersection of 103rd Street and Roosevelt Avenue. It is served by the 7 train at all times. The <7> train skips this station when it operates.

== History ==
=== Early history ===
The 1913 Dual Contracts called for the Interborough Rapid Transit Company (IRT) and Brooklyn Rapid Transit Company (BRT; later Brooklyn–Manhattan Transit Corporation, or BMT) to build new lines in Brooklyn, Queens, and the Bronx. Queens did not receive many new IRT and BRT lines compared to Brooklyn and the Bronx, since the city's Public Service Commission (PSC) wanted to alleviate subway crowding in the other two boroughs first before building in Queens, which was relatively undeveloped. The IRT Flushing Line was to be one of two Dual Contracts lines in the borough, along with the Astoria Line; it would connect Flushing and Long Island City, two of Queens's oldest settlements, to Manhattan via the Steinway Tunnel. When the majority of the line was built in the early 1910s, most of the route went through undeveloped land, and Roosevelt Avenue had not been constructed. Community leaders advocated for more Dual Contracts lines to be built in Queens to allow development there.

This station opened on April 21, 1917, as Alburtis Avenue, as the easternmost station of an extension of the Flushing line past Queensboro Plaza. It was later renamed 104th Street, giving the possibility of a sealed exit at the north end, before taking its current name of 103rd Street–Corona Plaza. This station still contains signs showing Alburtis Avenue, but which now have been covered up. This station was the eastern terminal for the joint BMT and IRT services on the line until the extension to 111th Street opened on October 13, 1925.

=== Later years ===
The city government took over the IRT's operations on June 12, 1940. The IRT routes were given numbered designations in 1948 with the introduction of "R-type" rolling stock, which contained rollsigns with numbered designations for each service. The route from Times Square to Flushing became known as the 7. On October 17, 1949, the joint BMT/IRT operation of the Flushing Line ended, and the line became the responsibility of the IRT. After the end of BMT/IRT dual service, the New York City Board of Transportation announced that the Flushing Line platforms would be lengthened to 11 IRT car lengths; the platforms were only able to fit nine 51-foot-long IRT cars beforehand. The platforms at the station were extended in 1955–1956 to accommodate 11-car trains. However, nine-car trains continued to run on the 7 route until 1962, when they were extended to ten cars. With the opening of the 1964 New York World's Fair, trains were lengthened to eleven cars.

As part of the 2015–2019 Capital Program, the MTA announced plans to renovate the 52nd, 61st, 69th, 82nd, 103rd and 111th Streets stations, a project that had been delayed for several years. Conditions at these stations were reported to be among the worst of all stations in the subway system. The Flushing-bound platform at the 103rd Street station closed for a five-month renovation starting in May 2025 and reopened in September 2026; the Manhattan-bound platform will in turn be similarly closed for rehabilitation.

As part of its 2025–2029 Capital Program, the MTA has proposed making the station wheelchair-accessible in compliance with the Americans with Disabilities Act of 1990.

== Station layout ==
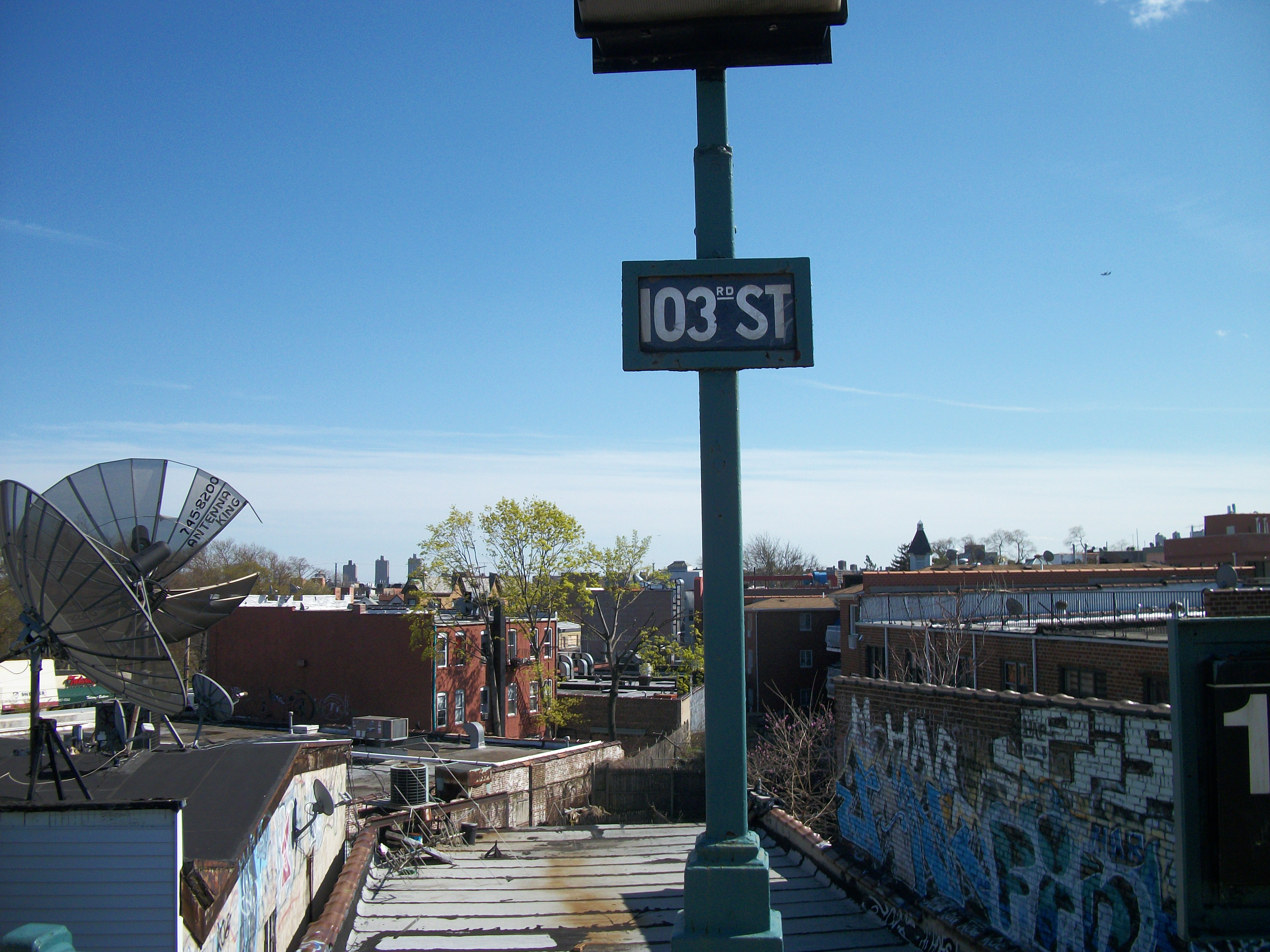
Old-fashioned smaller signs on the northbound platform in April 2011.

This elevated station has three tracks and two side platforms. The center track is used by the rush hour peak direction <7> express service. Both platforms have beige windscreens and brown canopies supported by green frames and support columns in the center and green waist-high steel fences at both ends. The station names are in the standard black plates with white lettering, though some lampposts at both ends have their original white signs in black lettering.

=== Exits ===
This station's only entrance/exit is an elevated station house beneath the tracks. A pair of staircases from either side of Roosevelt Avenue between 103rd and 104th Streets go up to the station house, where there is a token booth in the center and a turnstile bank on either side. Both turnstile banks lead to a wooden waiting area/crossunder and have a single staircase going up to either platform.
