= 82nd Street–Jackson Heights station =

New York City Subway station in Queens

82 Street–Jackson Heights
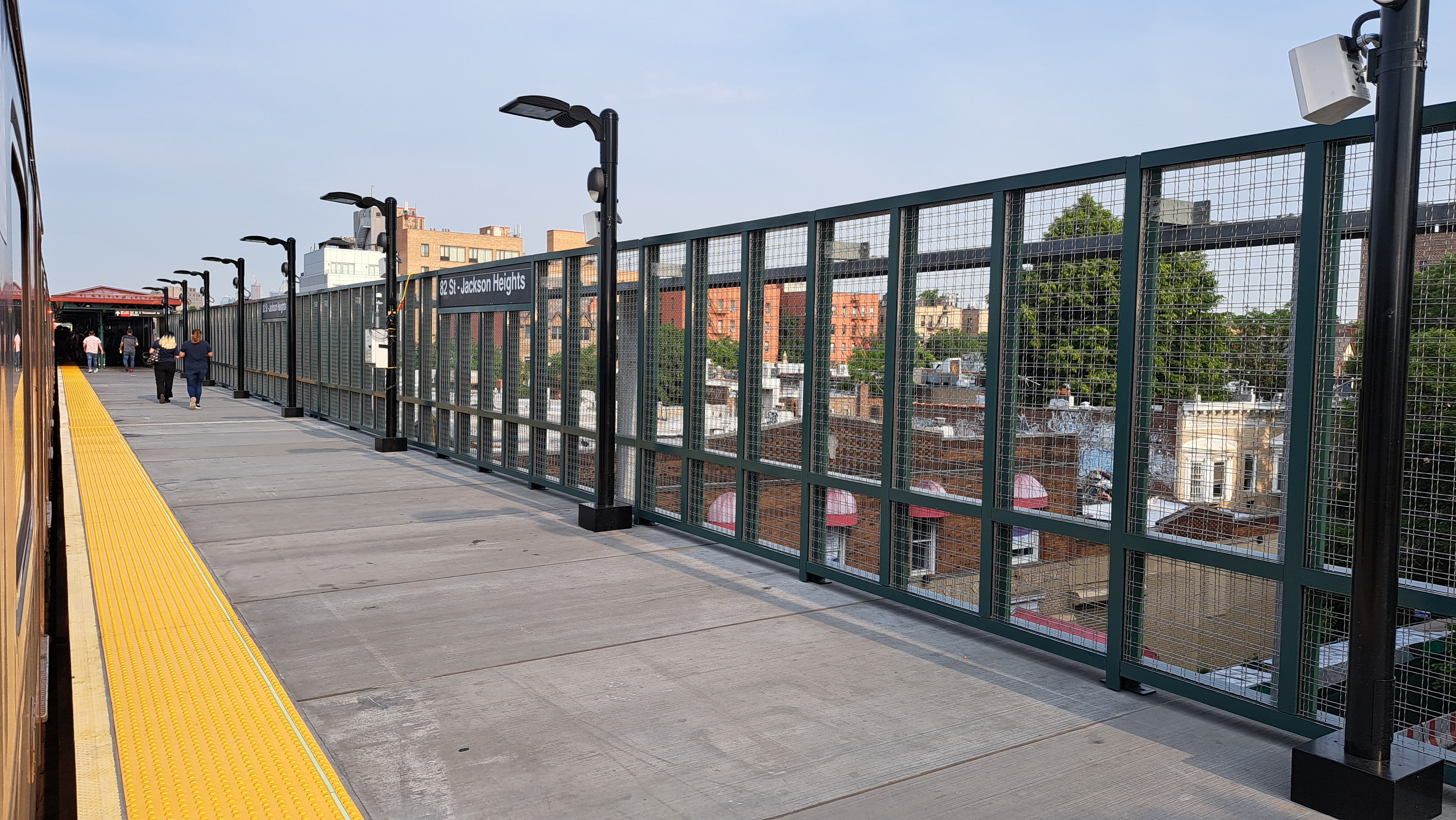
- 82 St–Jackson Heights view from onboard a train (2024)

Station statistics
- Address: 82nd Street and Roosevelt Avenue; Queens, New York
- Borough: Queens
- Locale: Jackson Heights, Elmhurst
- Coordinates: 40°44′51.47″N 73°53′1.78″W
- Division: A (IRT)
- Line: IRT Flushing Line
- Services: 7 (all times)
- Transit: NYCT Bus: Q29; MTA Bus: Q32, Q33
- Structure: Elevated
- Platforms: 2 side platforms
- Tracks: 3

Other information
- Opened: April 21, 1917; 109 years ago
- Former/other names: 25th Street; 25th Street (Jackson Heights)

Traffic
- 2025: 3,648,388 ▲46.9%
- Rank: 98 out of 423
Services
Preceding station	New York City Subway	Following station
74th Street–Broadway toward 34th Street–Hudson Yards	Local	90th Street–Elmhurst Avenue toward Flushing–Main Street
does not stop here
Location
Location within New York City Subway
Location within New York City
Location within New York
Track layout
Street map
Station service legend
Symbol	Description
Stops all times	Stops all times

The 82nd Street–Jackson Heights station (formerly known as 25th Street (Jackson Heights) station) is a local station on the IRT Flushing Line of the New York City Subway. Located at the intersection of 82nd Street and Roosevelt Avenue on the border of Jackson Heights and Elmhurst in Queens, it is served by the 7 train at all times. The <7> train skips this station when it operates.

== History ==
=== Early history ===
The 1913 Dual Contracts called for the Interborough Rapid Transit Company (IRT) and Brooklyn Rapid Transit Company (BRT; later Brooklyn–Manhattan Transit Corporation, or BMT) to build new lines in Brooklyn, Queens, and the Bronx. Queens did not receive many new IRT and BRT lines compared to Brooklyn and the Bronx, since the city's Public Service Commission (PSC) wanted to alleviate subway crowding in the other two boroughs first before building in Queens, which was relatively undeveloped. The IRT Flushing Line was to be one of two Dual Contracts lines in the borough, along with the Astoria Line; it would connect Flushing and Long Island City, two of Queens's oldest settlements, to Manhattan via the Steinway Tunnel. When the majority of the line was built in the early 1910s, most of the route went through undeveloped land, and Roosevelt Avenue had not been constructed. Community leaders advocated for more Dual Contracts lines to be built in Queens to allow development there.

The Flushing Line was opened from Queensboro Plaza to Alburtis Avenue (now 103rd Street–Corona Plaza) on April 21, 1917, with a local station at what is now 82nd Street. The current 82nd Street station was known as "25th Street" from its opening until March 10, 1921, when it was renamed "25th Street (Jackson Heights)". The station was again renamed on April 2, 1925, to "82nd Street–Jackson Heights".

=== Later years ===
The city government took over the IRT's operations on June 12, 1940. The IRT routes were given numbered designations in 1948 with the introduction of "R-type" rolling stock, which contained rollsigns with numbered designations for each service. The route from Times Square to Flushing became known as the 7. On October 17, 1949, the joint BMT/IRT operation of the Flushing Line ended, and the line became the responsibility of the IRT. After the end of BMT/IRT dual service, the New York City Board of Transportation announced that the Flushing Line platforms would be lengthened to 11 IRT car lengths; the platforms were only able to fit nine 51-foot-long IRT cars beforehand. The platforms at the station were extended in 1955–1956 to accommodate 11-car trains. However, nine-car trains continued to run on the 7 route until 1962, when they were extended to ten cars. With the opening of the 1964 New York World's Fair, trains were lengthened to eleven cars.

In 1981, the Metropolitan Transportation Authority (MTA) listed the station among the 69 most deteriorated stations in the subway system. A renovation of the 82nd Street station was funded as part of the MTA's 1980–1984 capital plan. The MTA received a $106 million grant (equivalent to $342,649,516 in 2025) from the Urban Mass Transit Administration in October 1983; most of the grant would fund the renovation of eleven stations, including 82nd Street.

As part of the 2015–2019 Capital Program, the MTA announced plans to renovate the 52nd, 61st, 69th, 82nd, 103rd and 111th Streets stations, a project that had been delayed for several years. Conditions at these stations were reported to be among the worst of all stations in the subway system. The Manhattan-bound platform at the 82nd Street–Jackson Heights station was closed for renovation on May 15, 2023, and reopened on April 19, 2024. The Flushing-bound platform at this station was closed for renovation on May 6, 2024, and reopened on January 22, 2025.

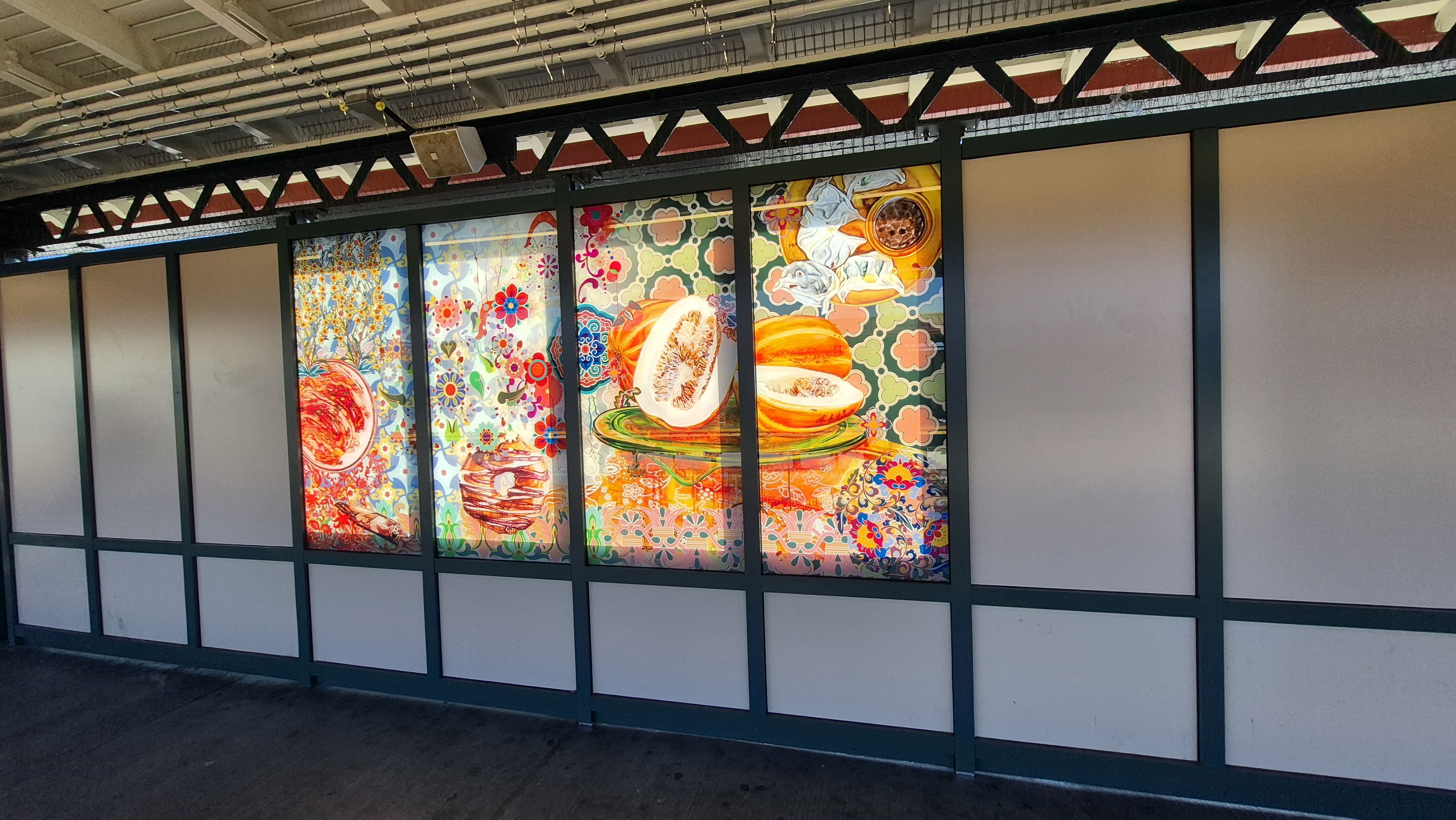
Artwork installed in 2025 at 82 St-Jackson Heights on the 7 line

== Station layout ==
This elevated station has three tracks and two side platforms. The center track is used by the peak direction rush hour <7> express service. Both platforms have beige windscreens and brown canopies supported by green frames and columns in the center and black waist-high steel fences at either ends. The station signs are in the standard black name plate in white lettering. Prior to the station's rehabilitation in the 2020s, each platform had a large "82" sign between the two staircases to the mezzanine below.

=== Exits ===
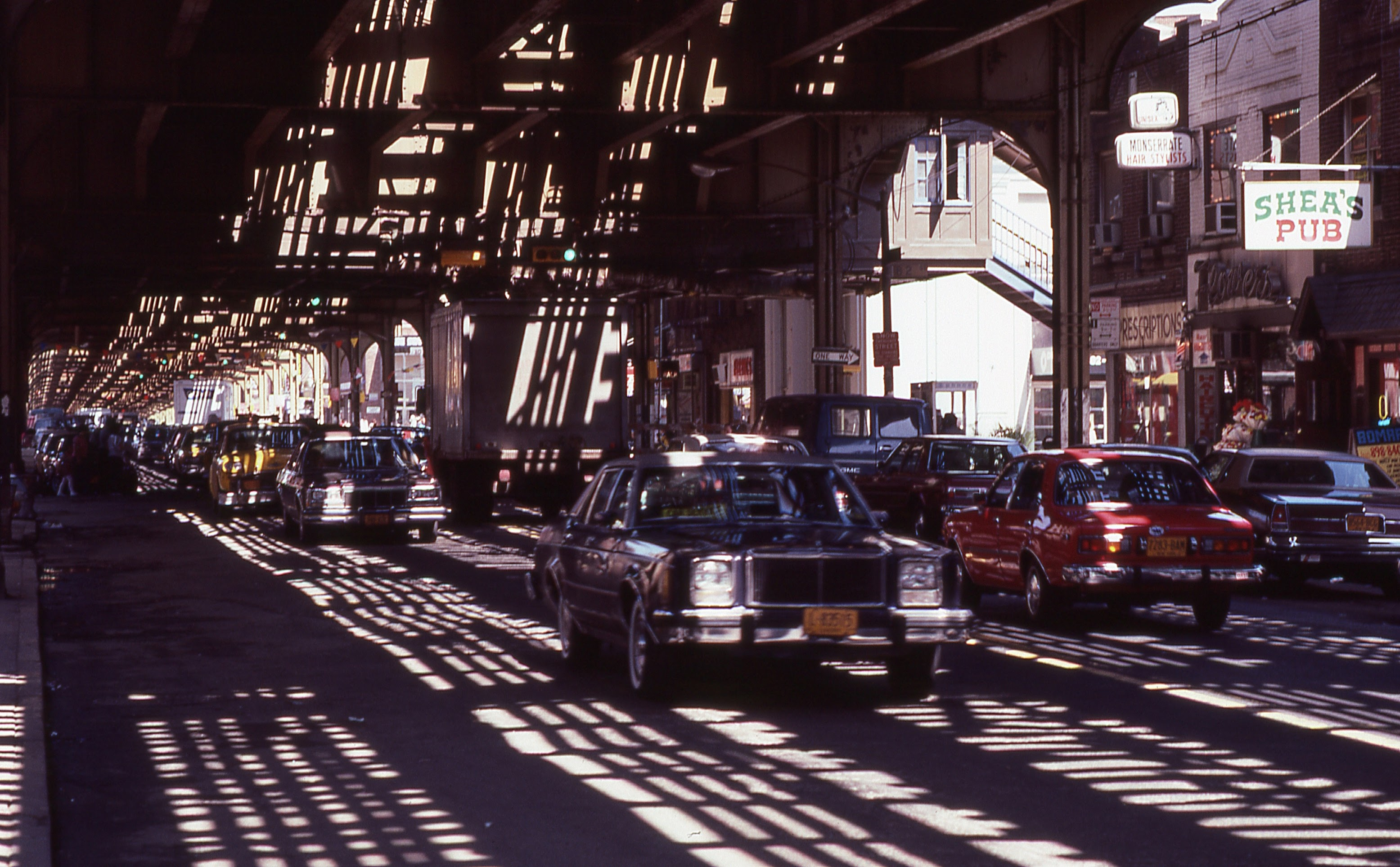
Under 82nd Street station in the mid-to-late-1980s. Note the staircase on the corner of the intersection with Roosevelt Avenue.

This station's one entrance/exit is an elevated station house beneath the tracks. It is built of wood and bricks and has a concrete flooring. It has three staircases from all corners of 82nd Street and Roosevelt Avenue except the southeast one and a token booth in the center. Two turnstile banks at either ends lead to a waiting area/crossunder and one staircase to each platform at the center.
