= 69th Street station (IRT Flushing Line) =

New York City Subway station in Queens

69 Street
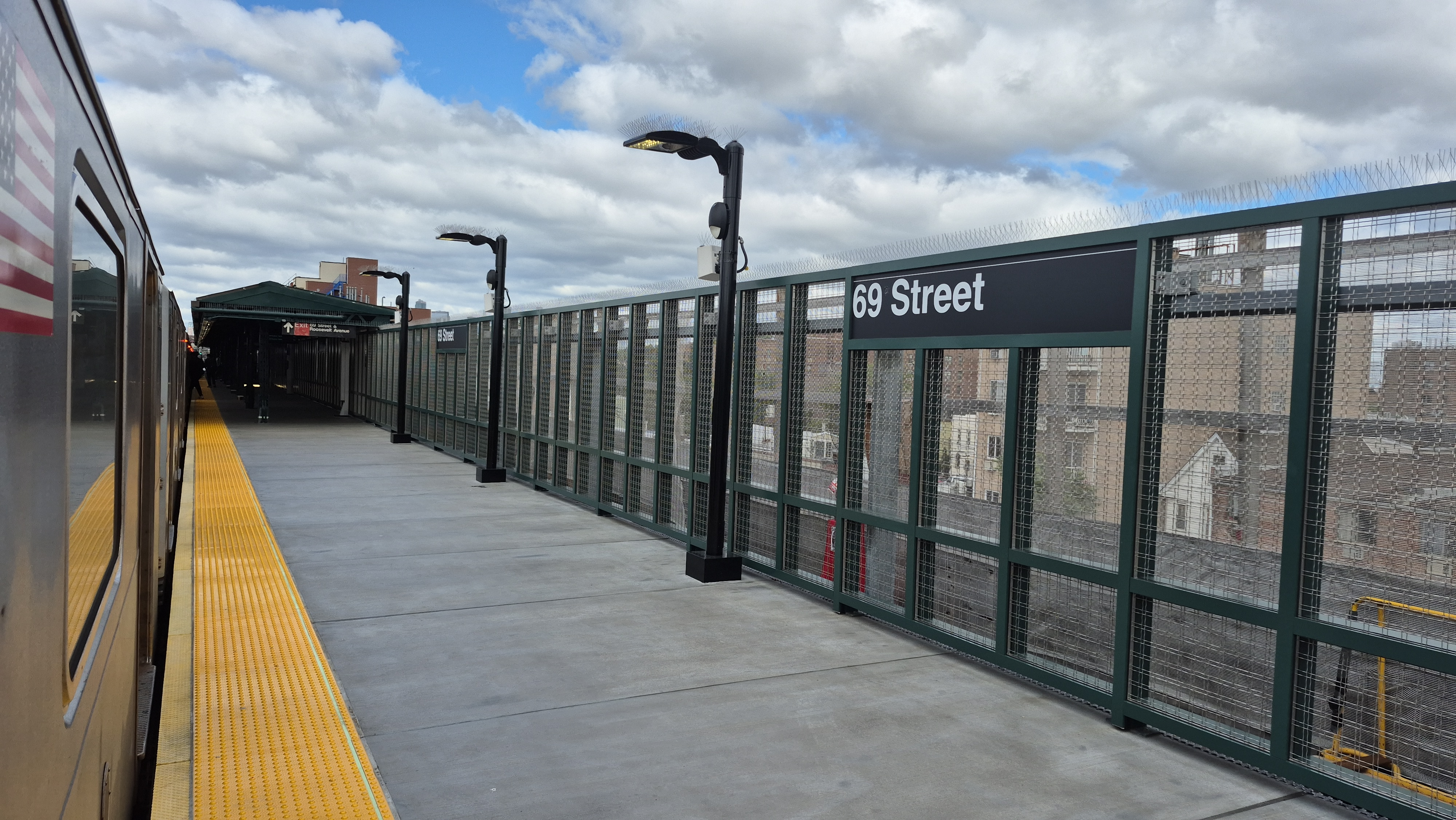
- Manhattan-bound platform in 2026

Station statistics
- Address: 69th Street & Roosevelt Avenue; Woodside, New York
- Borough: Queens
- Locale: Woodside
- Coordinates: 40°44′46.53″N 73°53′48.66″W
- Division: A (IRT)
- Line: IRT Flushing Line
- Services: 7 (all times)
- Transit: MTA Bus: Q32
- Structure: Elevated
- Platforms: 2 side platforms
- Tracks: 3

Other information
- Opened: April 21, 1917; 109 years ago
- Former/other names: 69th Street–Fisk Avenue

Traffic
- 2025: 1,151,205 ▼20.8%
- Rank: 286 out of 423
Services
| Preceding station | New York City Subway | Following station |
|---|---|---|
| 61st Street–Woodside toward 34th Street–Hudson Yards | Local | 74th Street–Broadway One-way operation |
does not stop here
Location
Location within New York City Subway
Location within New York City
Location within New York
Track layout
Street map
Station service legend
| Symbol | Description |
| Stops all times | Stops all times |

The 69th Street station (also known as the 69th Street–Fisk Avenue station) is a local station on the IRT Flushing Line of the New York City Subway. Located at 69th Street and Roosevelt Avenue in Woodside, Queens, it is served by the 7 train at all times.

== History ==
=== Early history ===
The 1913 Dual Contracts called for the Interborough Rapid Transit Company (IRT) and Brooklyn Rapid Transit Company (BRT; later Brooklyn–Manhattan Transit Corporation, or BMT) to build new lines in Brooklyn, Queens, and the Bronx. Queens did not receive many new IRT and BRT lines compared to Brooklyn and the Bronx, since the city's Public Service Commission (PSC) wanted to alleviate subway crowding in the other two boroughs first before building in Queens, which was relatively undeveloped. The IRT Flushing Line was to be one of two Dual Contracts lines in the borough, along with the Astoria Line; it would connect Flushing and Long Island City, two of Queens's oldest settlements, to Manhattan via the Steinway Tunnel. When the majority of the line was built in the early 1910s, most of the route went through undeveloped land, and Roosevelt Avenue had not been constructed. Community leaders advocated for more Dual Contracts lines to be built in Queens to allow development there.

The Flushing Line was opened from Queensboro Plaza to Alburtis Avenue (now 103rd Street–Corona Plaza) on April 21, 1917, with a local station at 69th Street.

=== Later years ===
A (7) train of R188 cars heading to Willets Point bypassing the Flushing-bound platform, as part of the Flushing Line renovation project in October 2026.

The city government took over the IRT's operations on June 12, 1940. The IRT routes were given numbered designations in 1948 with the introduction of "R-type" rolling stock, which contained rollsigns with numbered designations for each service. The route from Times Square to Flushing became known as the 7. On October 17, 1949, the joint BMT/IRT operation of the Flushing Line ended, and the line became the responsibility of the IRT. After the end of BMT/IRT dual service, the New York City Board of Transportation announced that the Flushing Line platforms would be lengthened to 11 IRT car lengths; the platforms were only able to fit nine 51-foot-long IRT cars beforehand. The platforms at the station were extended in 1955–1956 to accommodate 11-car trains. However, nine-car trains continued to run on the 7 route until 1962, when they were extended to ten cars. With the opening of the 1964 New York World's Fair, trains were lengthened to eleven cars.

As part of the 2015–2019 Capital Program, the MTA announced plans to renovate the 52nd, 61st, 69th, 82nd, 103rd and 111th Streets stations, a project that had been delayed for several years. Conditions at these stations were reported to be among the worst of all stations in the subway system. The Manhattan-bound platform at the 69th Street station was closed for renovation starting winter 2025, followed by the closure of the Flushing-bound platform. On June 23, 2025, the Manhattan-bound platform closed for renovations until early 2026. The Manhattan-bound platform reopened on May 25, 2026, while the Flushing-bound platform closed for renovations at the time, with an expected reopening date of 2027.

== Station layout ==
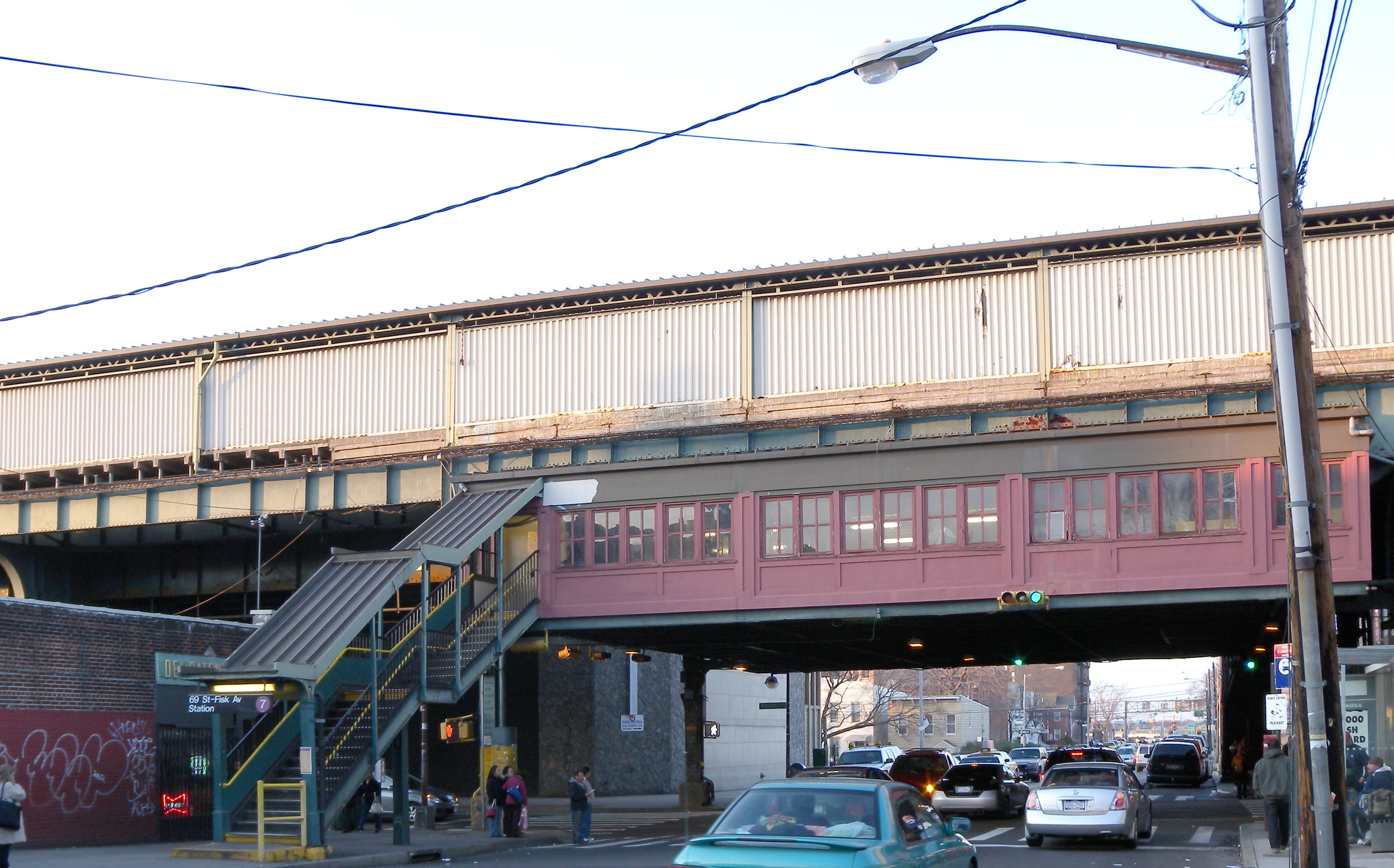
South side from street

This elevated station has three tracks and two side platforms. The center track is used by the peak direction express service during rush hours. The extreme north (geographical east) end of the northbound platform is a closed work stair leading to a storage area below the tracks.

Both platforms have beige windscreens and brown canopies with green support frames and columns in the center and black, waist-high, steel fences at either ends. Black lampposts are at the un-canopied sections at regular intervals and the station signs are in the standard black name plate in white lettering.

The Brooklyn-Queens Expressway passes under the IRT Flushing Line just east of the station. There were formerly crossovers and switches between this station and 61st Street–Woodside. They were removed in 2008 and replaced with crossovers on either side of 74th Street–Broadway. The new crossovers are set up in such a way that trains going in either direction on the express track can stop at 74th Street.

Under the elevated structure of the Flushing Line directly east of the station and the Brooklyn-Queens Expressway and two tracks of the New York Connecting Railroad, which is used for freight by CSX, Canadian Pacific, and Providence and Worcester Railroad.

=== Exits ===
This station has one elevated station house beneath the center of the platforms and tracks. Two staircases from the street, one at the northeast corner of 69th Street and Roosevelt Avenue and the other at the southwest corner, go up to the mezzanine, where there is a token booth at the center and a turnstile bank at either ends. Both turnstile banks lead to a waiting area/crossunder and have one staircase going up to each platform.
