= Jackson Heights–Roosevelt Avenue/74th Street station =

New York City Subway station in Queens

Jackson Heights– Roosevelt Avenue/74 Street
- New York City Subway station complex
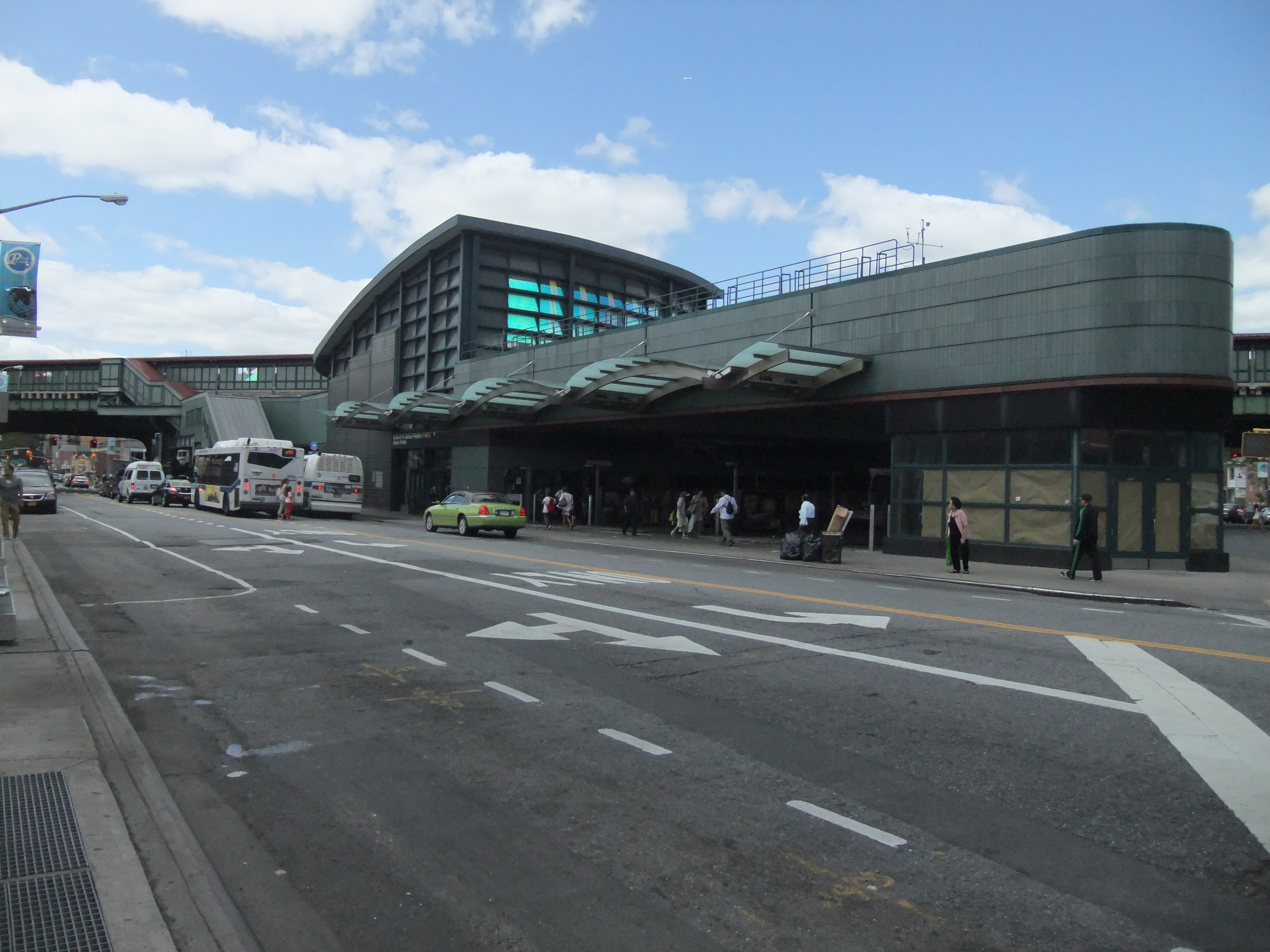
- The station complex and adjoining bus terminal as seen from Broadway and 75th Street

Station statistics
- Address: Roosevelt Avenue, 74th Street & Broadway; Jackson Heights, New York
- Borough: Queens
- Locale: Jackson Heights, Elmhurst
- Coordinates: 40°44′48″N 73°53′28″W
- Division: A (IRT), B (IND)
- Line: IRT Flushing Line; IND Queens Boulevard Line
- Services: 7 (all times) <7> (rush hours until 9:30 p.m., peak direction); E (all times); F (all times) <F> (two rush hour trains, peak direction); M (weekdays during the day); R (all times except late nights)
- Transit: See Victor A. Moore Bus Terminal
- Levels: 2

Other information
- Accessible: Yes

Traffic
- 2025: 14,756,015 ▼2.3%
- Rank: 10 out of 423
Location
Location within New York City Subway
Location within New York City
Location within New York
Street map
Station service legend
Symbol	Description
Stops all times except late nights	Stops all times except late nights
Stops all times	Stops all times
Stops weekdays during the day	Stops weekdays during the day
Stops rush hours in the peak direction only (limited service)	Stops rush hours in the peak direction only (limited service)

The Jackson Heights–Roosevelt Avenue/74th Street station is a New York City Subway station complex served by the IRT Flushing Line and the IND Queens Boulevard Line. Located at the triangle of 74th Street, Broadway, and Roosevelt Avenue on the border of Jackson Heights and Elmhurst in Queens, it is served by the 7, E, and F trains at all times; the R train at all times except late nights; the M train on weekdays during the day; and the <F> train during rush hours in the reverse peak direction.

The complex consists of two stations: the elevated station at Broadway–74th Street, built for the Interborough Rapid Transit Company (IRT) and Brooklyn Rapid Transit Company (BRT), and the underground IND station at Jackson Heights–Roosevelt Avenue, built for the Independent Subway System (IND). The elevated station was built as part of the Dual Contracts and opened on April 21, 1917; the station was also served by the BRT and its successor, the Brooklyn–Manhattan Transit Corporation, until 1949. The IND station opened on August 19, 1933, and was the terminus of the Queens Boulevard Line until 1936. Escalators between the two stations were installed in the 1950s, and the complex was substantially rebuilt between 2000 and 2005.

The IRT Flushing Line station has two side platforms and three tracks; rush-hour express trains use the inner track to bypass the station. The IND Queens Boulevard Line station has two island platforms and four tracks. A third platform above the Queens Boulevard Line platforms was completed as part of the IND Second System but never opened. The station complex contains elevators, which make it compliant with the Americans with Disabilities Act of 1990. There is also an at-grade bus terminal, known as the Victor A. Moore Bus Terminal, next to the station's main entrance at Broadway and Roosevelt Avenue. In 2025, it was the second busiest subway station in Queens and the 10th busiest subway station in the system.

== History ==
=== Development ===
==== IRT station ====
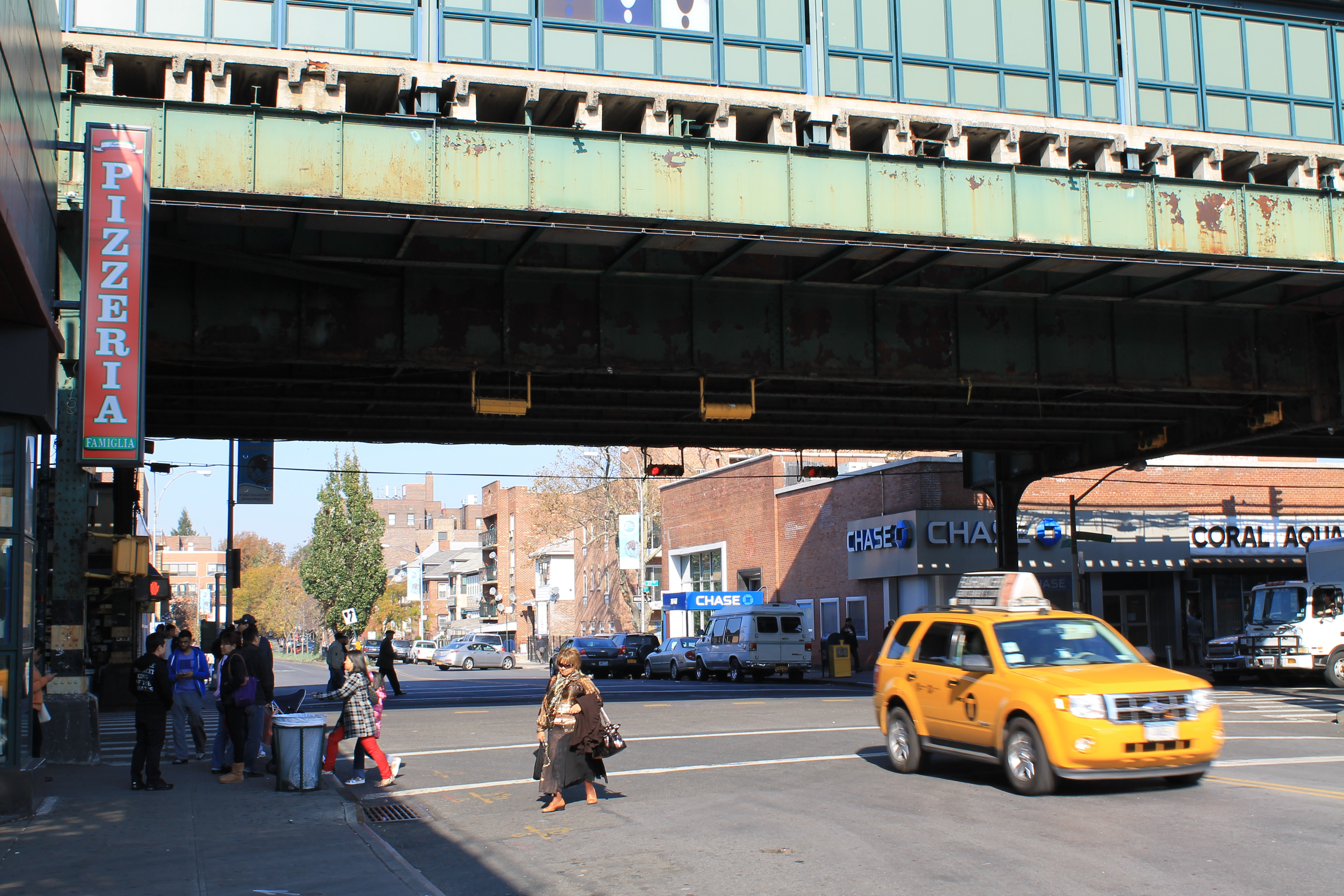
The eastern end of the IRT Flushing Line station, at 75th Street and Roosevelt Avenue

The 1913 Dual Contracts called for the Interborough Rapid Transit Company (IRT) and Brooklyn Rapid Transit Company (BRT; later Brooklyn–Manhattan Transit Corporation, or BMT) to build new lines in Brooklyn, Queens, and the Bronx. Queens did not receive many new IRT and BRT lines compared to Brooklyn and the Bronx, since the city's Public Service Commission (PSC) wanted to alleviate subway crowding in the other two boroughs first before building in Queens, which was relatively undeveloped. The IRT Flushing Line was to be one of two Dual Contracts lines in the borough, along with the Astoria Line; it would connect Flushing and Long Island City, two of Queens's oldest settlements, to Manhattan via the Steinway Tunnel. When the majority of the line was built in the early 1910s, most of the route went through undeveloped land, and Roosevelt Avenue had not been constructed. Community leaders advocated for more Dual Contracts lines to be built in Queens to allow development there.

The 74th Street station opened on April 21, 1917, as part of an extension of the line from Queensboro Plaza to 103rd Street–Corona Plaza. At the time, the station was known as Broadway. The IRT agreed to operate the line under the condition that any loss of profits would be repaid by the city. The opening of the line helped spur the development of Jackson Heights, Queens, which previously had been farmland. In 1923, the BMT started operating shuttle services along the Flushing Line, which terminated at Queensboro Plaza. The city government took over the IRT's operations on June 12, 1940. The IRT routes were given numbered designations in 1948 with the introduction of "R-type" rolling stock, which contained rollsigns with numbered designations for each service. The route from Times Square to Flushing became known as the 7.

==== IND station ====
The Queens Boulevard Lines was one of the first built by the city-owned Independent Subway System (IND), and was planned to stretch between the IND Eighth Avenue Line in Manhattan and 178th Street and Hillside Avenue in Jamaica, Queens, with a stop at Roosevelt Avenue. The line was first proposed in 1925. Construction of the line was approved by the New York City Board of Estimate on October 4, 1928. As planned, Roosevelt Avenue was to be one of the Queens Boulevard Line's five express stops, as well as one of 22 total stops on the line between Seventh Avenue in Manhattan and 178th Street in Queens. Although the line ran along Queens Boulevard for much of its route, the segment in western Queens was diverted northward to serve Jackson Heights. The line was constructed using the cut-and-cover tunneling method. Temporary bridges were built over the trenches to allow pedestrians to cross, and Roosevelt Avenue was partially closed. Construction of the line between Manhattan and Jackson Heights was split into four phases; by late 1931, these phases were between 90% and 99% complete.

Before the IND station opened, Bickford's leased a store within a two-story building that housed one of the subway's entrances. The Roosevelt Avenue station opened on August 19, 1933, as the terminus of the first section of the line, which stretched from the connection to the Eighth Avenue Line at 50th Street. Three thousand people converged at the station's 73rd and 74th Street exits, hoping to be the first to ride. A transfer to and from the Flushing Line station at Broadway was implemented. One real-estate expert wrote that the station was "the only place in Queens where the interchange between the elevated and the subway system can be made at a common point". Initially, the line was served only by E trains, which ran local. In its first year, the IND station collected nearly two million fares, more than the IRT and BMT collected at the Broadway station. By 1938, the station recorded over five million annual entries.

The construction of the new Roosevelt Avenue complex led to increased demand for housing in the area. It also inspired plans for an unbuilt shopping mall nearby, and real-estate investors speculated that sales and rentals of real estate on Roosevelt Avenue would increase significantly. However, no large commercial developments were built around the station in the years after the IND station opened. The station was the Queens Boulevard Line's terminus from 1933 until an extension east to Union Turnpike opened on December 31, 1936. The E began making express stops on the line in 1937, and local GG trains began serving the Roosevelt Avenue station at the time. With the opening of the IND Sixth Avenue Line in 1940, F trains began running express along the Queens Boulevard Line west of 71st Avenue, stopping at the Roosevelt Avenue station.

As part of the never-completed IND Second System, announced in 1929, the Winfield Spur line would have diverged from the Queens Boulevard Line just east of the Roosevelt Avenue station. A second station was built for this line above the Queens Boulevard Line platforms; the Winfield Spur station was finished but never opened.

=== Station complex ===
==== 1940s and 1950s ====
In 1940, Victor Moore, a notable Broadway performer and Freeport resident, asked the New York City Board of Estimate for permission to build a $375,000 bus terminal in his name near the station. When the Board of Estimate approved the project that December, Moore invited board members to see his musical Louisiana Purchase at the Imperial Theatre. Moore acquired all remaining lots on the block in February 1941 and began construction on the terminal that June, obtaining a $250,000 mortgage for the project. Nine businesses signed lease for the terminal in September, and the Victor Moore Arcade officially opened on December 11, 1941. It served as a hub for the operations of Triboro Coach, allowing subway passengers to transfer to and from buses for distant neighborhoods and for LaGuardia Airport.

As part of the unification of the New York City Subway system, free transfers between the BMT/IRT and IND stations commenced on July 1, 1948; initially, passengers were issued paper tickets. On October 17, 1949, the joint BMT/IRT operation of the Flushing Line ended, and the line became the responsibility of the IRT. In August 1951, the New York City Board of Transportation approved the installation of six escalators at the Roosevelt Avenue/74th Street station. The $965,000 contract called for one escalator between the IND mezzanine and either of the IND platforms; two escalators between the IND and IRT mezzanines; and one escalator between the IRT mezzanine and either of the IRT platforms. In 1956, the New York City Transit Authority announced that it would open a request for proposal for additional escalators between the IRT and IND stations. At the time, the station had six exits, (Note: One exit through the arcade, two at the intersection of Broadway and 75th Street, one each at Broadway's intersections with 73rd and 74th Streets, and one at the intersection of 73rd Street and 37th Road.) but only one token booth in the IND mezzanine, which led to severe congestion during rush hours.

After the end of BMT/IRT dual service, the New York City Board of Transportation announced that the Flushing Line platforms would be lengthened to 11 IRT car lengths; the platforms were only able to fit nine 51-foot-long IRT cars beforehand. The platforms at the 74th Street station were extended in 1955–1956 to accommodate 11-car trains. However, nine-car trains continued to run on the 7 route until 1962, when they were extended to ten cars. With the opening of the 1964 New York World's Fair, trains were lengthened to eleven cars.

==== 1960s to 1980s ====
On May 2, 1970, an out-of-service GG train collided with another GG train in revenue service on the Queens Boulevard Line. The revenue-service train was switching from the southbound express track to the local track (it had been rerouted around the out-of-service train). Two people died and 71 were injured in the worst subway collision since the 1928 Times Square derailment. Following the 1970 accident, New York Magazine highlighted the state of the subway system in a lengthy exposé, in which it concluded that the subway's condition was getting worse compared to previous years. The station remained a transfer hub for passengers traveling to LaGuardia Airport, which had no direct subway service.

To speed up passenger flow, dozens of platform conductors were assigned to direct crowds on the Queens Boulevard Line platforms during the late 1980s.

==== 1990s and 2000s ====
Triboro Coach leased the Victor Moore Arcade from Arnold Gumowitz for $1 a year until 1997. The Metropolitan Transportation Authority (MTA) acquired the Victor Moore Arcade in March 1999, paying Gumowitz $9.5 million. Later that year, the MTA began buying out 25 merchants' leases within the arcade in preparation for a $90 million renovation of the station complex. The MTA planned to install four elevators, rebuild staircases, and erect the station's main entrance on the arcade's site. At the time, the station was the second-busiest in Queens, but the bus terminal was too short to fit CNG-powered buses. The arcade's layout was also inconvenient; bus passengers had to walk outside or through a bakery to access the subway, and passengers had to ascend to a mezzanine before they could access the underground Queens Boulevard Line platforms. The passageways were also narrow and convoluted, causing congestion during peak times.

The MTA proposed hiring Vollmer Associates to design the station's renovation in late 1999, and the MTA announced in 2000 that it would demolish the Victor Moore Arcade as part of the renovation. All merchants had moved out by May 2000. Advocacy group Straphangers Campaign conducted a poll the same year, in which riders ranked Jackson Heights–Roosevelt Avenue/74th Street station as the dirtiest among the city's 15 busiest stations. The MTA began restoring the bus terminal in early May 2001. The MTA approved a renovation of the station itself in September 2002; at the time, the project was slated to cost $87 million. Fox & Fowle and Vollmer Associates designed the project. The Flushing Line platforms and the bus terminal were completely rebuilt, and the canopies above the Flushing Line platforms were extended to cover the whole platform. The Queens Boulevard Line platforms were refurbished by construction firm Skanska at a total cost of $132 million. The renovation also involved adding 8,600 square feet (800 m^{2}) of retail space, expanding the upper mezzanine on either side of 74th Street, and installing elevators.

Local merchants complained that the construction damaged their stores and drove away customers. As part of the renovation, the MTA had removed the complex's payphones in April 2005, prompting state senator John Sabini to request that the phones be restored. The MTA agreed to restore the phones that August after Sabini said a woman had died at the station because the lack of phones made it hard to contact paramedics. Local residents also complained that the MTA did not give them enough information about closures due to the ongoing renovation. The new station building was completed in 2005 to a design by Stantec. The Jackson Heights bus terminal opened on July 13, 2005.

==== 2010s to present ====
In 2011, as part of a pilot program, the MTA installed an online interactive touchscreen kiosk called the "On The Go! Travel Station" at the Roosevelt Avenue/74th Street station. As part of a $11,2 million project, the MTA replaced two of the escalators connecting the IND and IRT mezzanines between July 2014 and early 2015. In late 2022, the MTA announced plans to replace three of the complex's elevators during 2023. In April 2025, the MTA announced plans to install taller fare gates with glass panels at 20 stations, including the Jackson Heights–Roosevelt Avenue/74th Street station. The fare gates would be manufactured by Cubic Transportation Systems, Conduent, Scheidt & Bachmann, and STraffic as part of a pilot program to reduce fare evasion. The same month, the Jackson Heights–Roosevelt Avenue/74th Street station became one of the first New York City Subway stations to have all their MetroCard vending machines removed, amid the replacement of the MetroCard with the OMNY fare payment system.

Plans for the Interborough Express, a light rail line using the Fremont Secondary right of way, were announced in 2023. As part of the project, a light rail station at Roosevelt Avenue has been proposed next to the existing subway station.

== Station layout ==
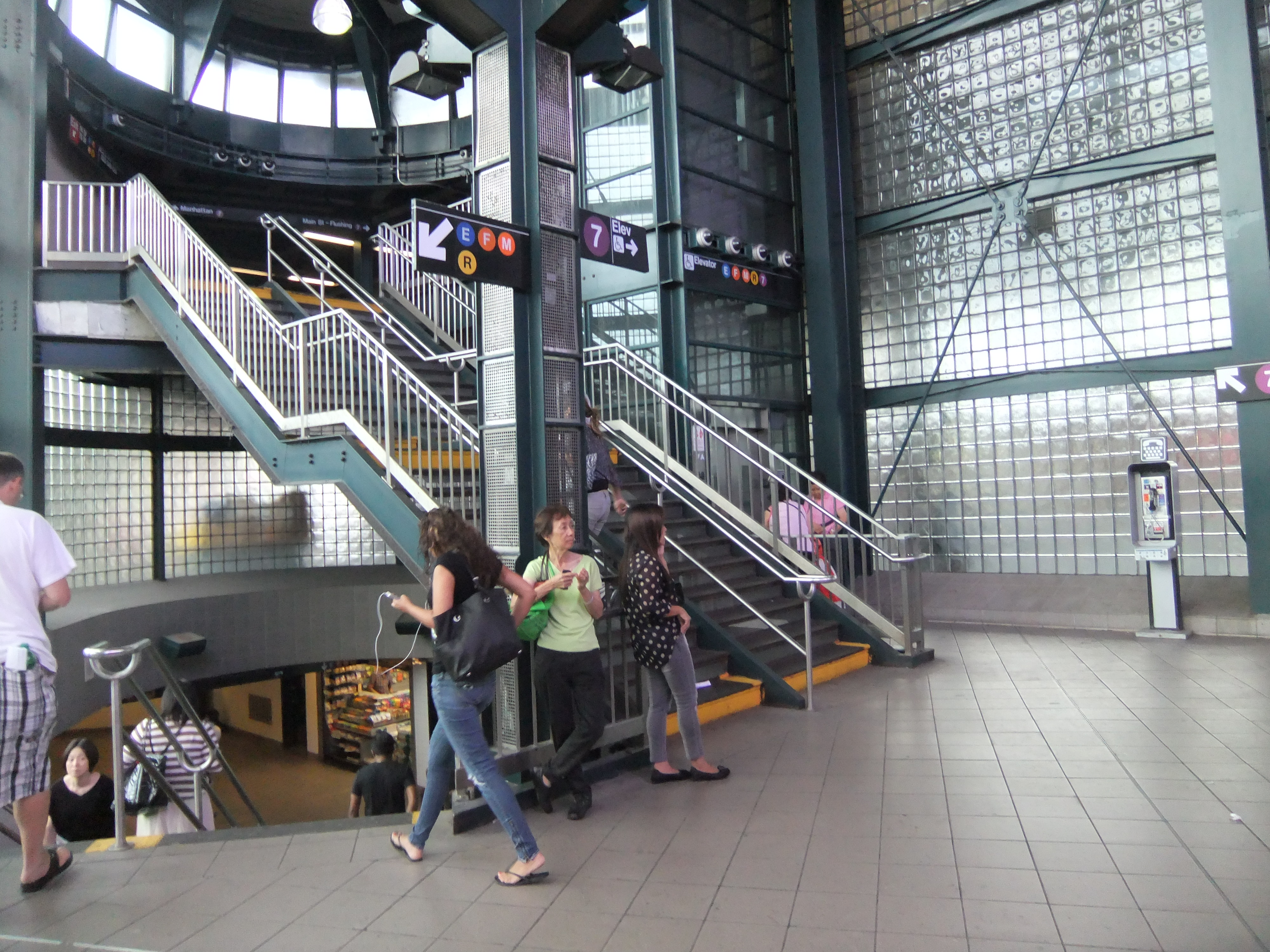
Staircases to the platforms from fare control. The IND Queens Boulevard Line staircases are to the left, while the IRT Flushing Line staircases are to the right.

The station complex consists of two separate stations, connected by escalators, stairs, and elevators. The main entrance, a station building bounded by Roosevelt Avenue, 75th Street, Broadway, and 74th Street, includes the Victor A. Moore Bus Terminal. The new station building is one of the first green buildings in the MTA system, which is partially powered by solar panels on the roof of the station building and above the IRT platform. The solar panels were added following the success of a similar project at the Coney Island–Stillwell Avenue station. The building is made of recycled material such as concrete consisted of 15% fly ash and steel that was prefabricated; in addition, the builders recycled 86% of the waste materials. The station building also contains some retail space at the corner of 75th Street and Broadway, and also leases a few other spaces between the fare control area and the bus terminal. Four elevators make the entire station complex ADA-accessible.

Two stairs and an elevator from each of the Flushing Line platforms, lead down to an above-ground landing, whereupon a set of stairs leads to the main station house, which also contains the station agent booth. The Flushing-bound platform's elevator leads from the Flushing-bound platform to the aboveground landing, then to the street level fare control, and finally to a landing between the street level and the belowground Queens Boulevard Line mezzanine. The full-time station agent booth, and two banks of turnstiles for fare control, are located in this station house at street level. Two escalators also lead directly from the Flushing Line landing to the Queens Boulevard Line mezzanine. From the mezzanine, various stairs lead down to each of the Queens Boulevard Line platforms, and an elevator from the belowground landing leads to the mezzanine and the Manhattan-bound platform. At the edges of the Flushing Line landing, stairs go towards a room where in the right, a narrow stairwell (originally an escalator passageway, but currently under construction) goes towards the Basement. There is another elevator from the Forest Hills- and Jamaica-bound platform to the mezzanine. There are also some stores and an ATM lining the mezzanine within fare control. In total, the station has 8,600 square feet (800 m^{2}) of storefront space.

The 2004 artwork in the station house is called Passage by Tom Patti, and was designed in conjunction with FX+FOWLE Architects. The artwork consisted of trapezoid-shaped laminated glass panels located on the upper part of the building's eastern facade. The glass panels break up light into different colors, depending on the vantage point.

=== Alternate exits ===
At 73rd Street and Broadway, on the north side of Roosevelt Avenue, a set of stairs from each of the IRT Flushing Line platforms lead down to a landing below the elevated structure. There is a connection to the Queens Boulevard Line mezzanine via three long, narrow escalators, where there are exits from the below-ground fare control points.

Exits from the underground mezzanine lead to the station building; the northeast corner of 73rd Street, 37th Road, and Broadway; the southwest corner of Broadway and 74th Street; and both eastern corners of Broadway and 75th Street. The only direct exit from the Flushing Line platforms is from the 74th Street mezzanine, which leads to the station building, with an additional side exit to the northeast corner of Roosevelt Avenue and 74th Street.

== IRT Flushing Line platforms ==
74 Street–Broadway
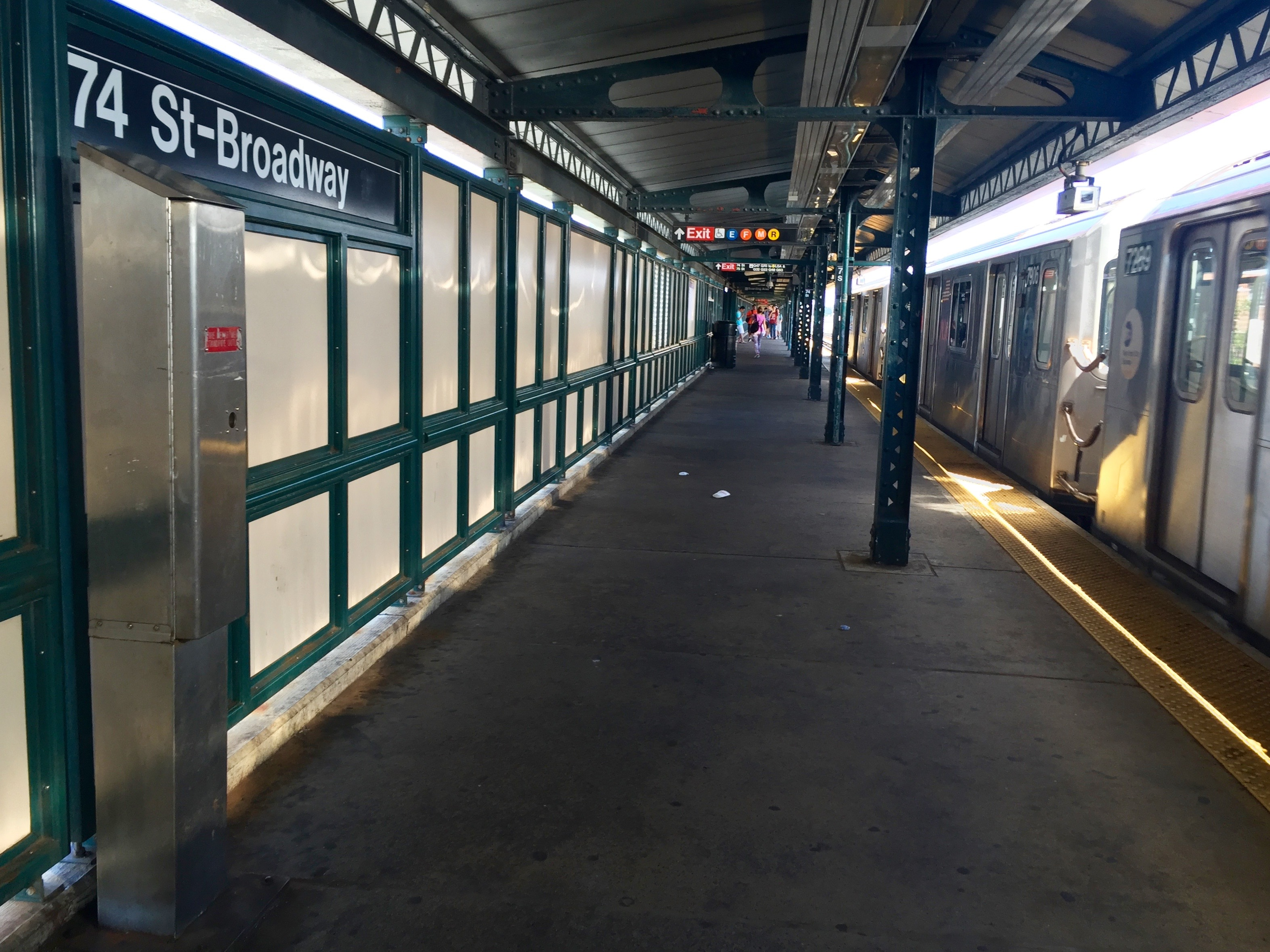
- Manhattan bound platform

Station statistics
- Division: A (IRT)
- Line: IRT Flushing Line
- Services: 7 (all times)
- Structure: Elevated
- Platforms: 2 side platforms
- Tracks: 3

Other information
- Opened: April 21, 1917; 109 years ago
- Accessible: Yes
- Former/other names: Broadway
Services
Preceding station	New York City Subway	Following station
69th Street toward 34th Street–Hudson Yards	Local	82nd Street–Jackson Heights toward Flushing–Main Street
61st Street–Woodside One-way operation	Local	82nd Street–Jackson Heights toward Flushing–Main Street
does not stop here
Track layout
Station service legend
Symbol	Description
Stops all times	Stops all times

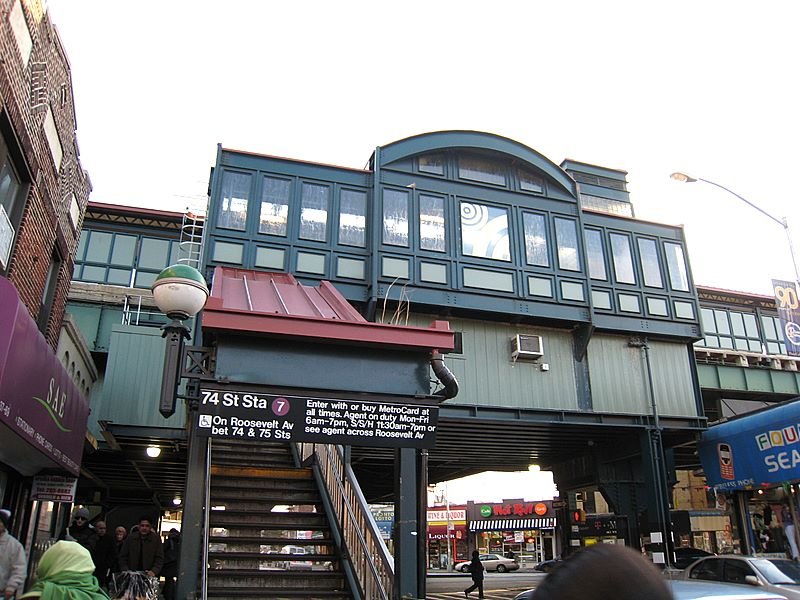
Side entrance at the northeast corner of Roosevelt Avenue and 74th Street

The 74th Street–Broadway station (originally Broadway station) on the IRT Flushing Line is a local station that has three tracks and two side platforms. The center track is used by the rush hour peak direction <7> express service; trains do not stop here, although there are track switches at either side to let express trains stop there in case of emergency or to allow transfers when work on a local track forces trains to run express. The station is between 69th Street to the west and 82nd Street–Jackson Heights to the east.

The station has two mezzanines under the platforms at 73rd and 74th Streets. The 74th Street mezzanine has a wooden floor with windscreens on the stairs, and a booth, with stairs to both the station building and to the northeast corner of 74th Street and Roosevelt Avenue. The 73rd Street mezzanine serves as a crossunder and connects with escalators to the IND platforms. The canopy at the west end is different, having been added later than the original canopy. Both canopies originally measured only 300 feet (91 m) long, but they were extended to cover the entire length of the platforms in the mid-2000s.

== IND Queens Boulevard Line platforms ==
Jackson Heights– Roosevelt Avenue
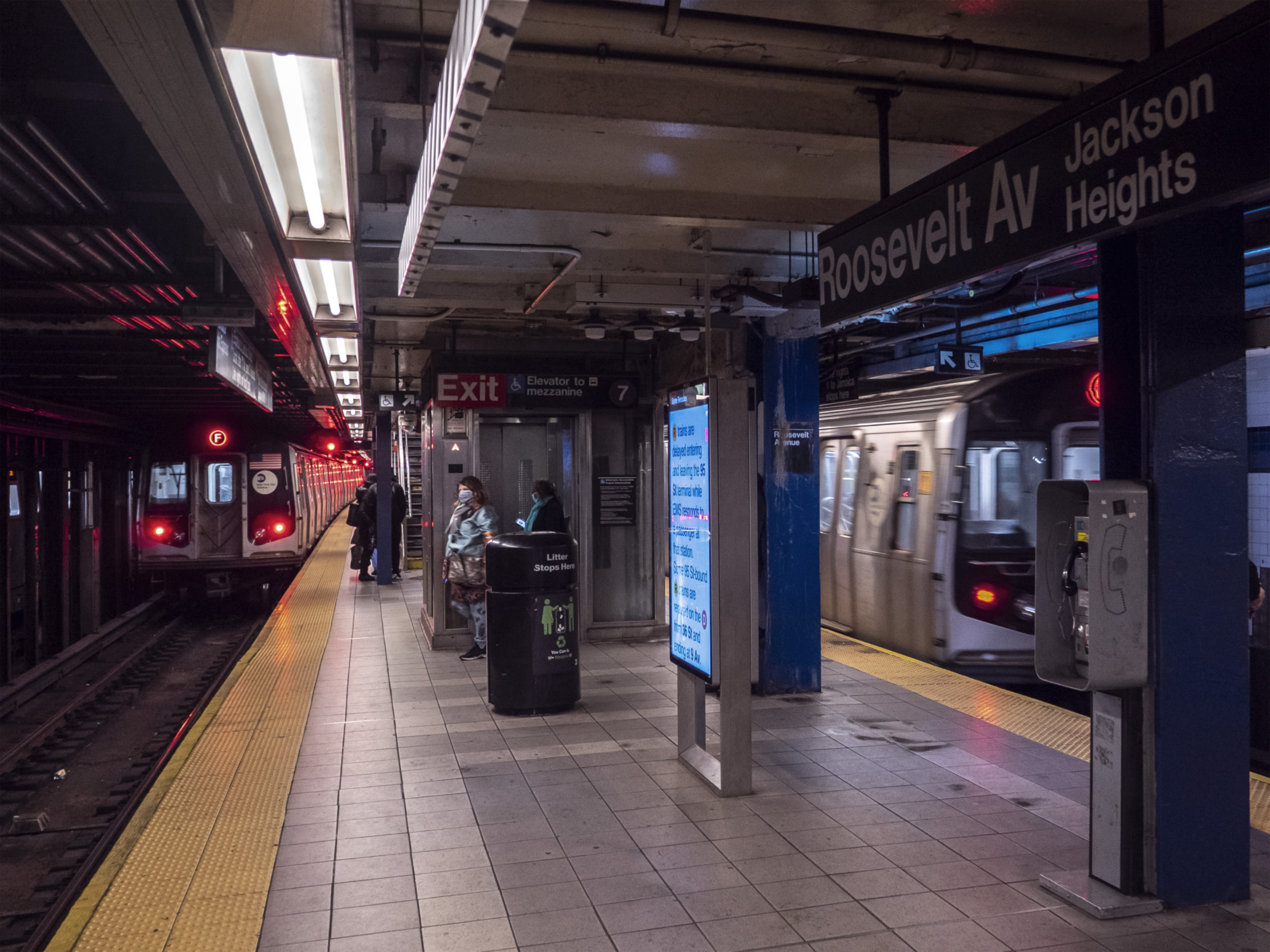
- R160 F and M trains departing northbound platform

Station statistics
- Division: B (IND)
- Line: IND Queens Boulevard Line
- Services: E (all times); F (all times) <F> (two rush hour trains, peak direction); M (weekdays during the day); R (all times except late nights)
- Structure: Underground
- Levels: 2 (upper level unused)
- Platforms: 2 island platforms cross-platform interchange
- Tracks: 4

Other information
- Opened: August 19, 1933; 93 years ago
- Accessible: Yes
- Former/other names: Roosevelt Avenue–Jackson Heights
Services
Preceding station	New York City Subway	Following station
Queens Plaza E F <F> via Fifth Avenue/53rd Street	Express	Forest Hills–71st Avenue E F <F> service splits
21st Street–Queensbridge F toward Coney Island–Stillwell Avenue	Express	Forest Hills–71st Avenue E F <F> service splits
65th Street E F M R via 36th Street	Local	Elmhurst Avenue E F M R toward Forest Hills–71st Avenue
Track layout
Lower level
Upper level
Station service legend
Symbol	Description
Stops all times except late nights	Stops all times except late nights
Stops all times	Stops all times
Stops late nights only	Stops late nights only
Stops weekdays during the day	Stops weekdays during the day
Stops weekends during the day	Stops weekends during the day
Stops rush hours in the peak direction only (limited service)	Stops rush hours in the peak direction only (limited service)

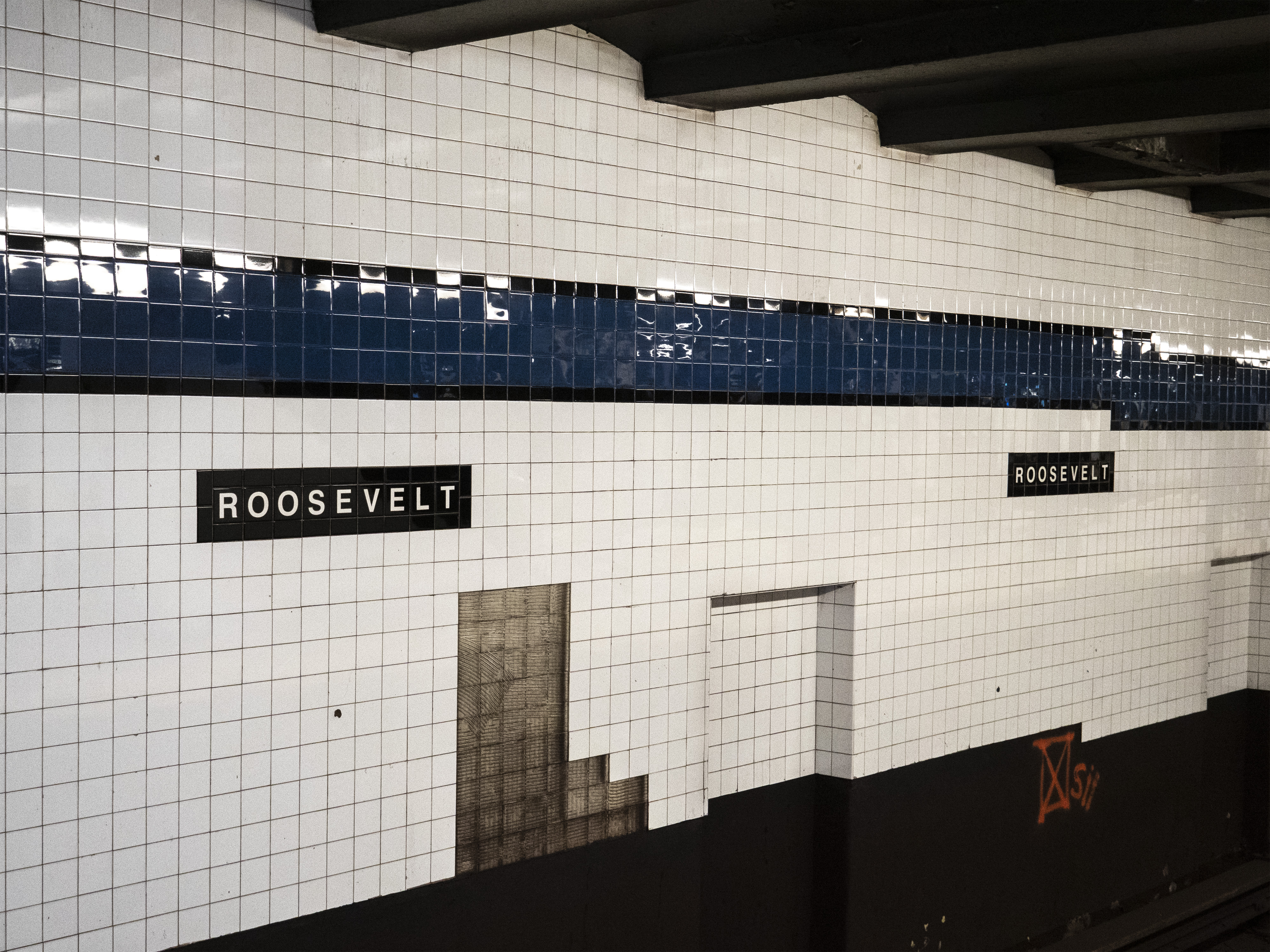
Renovated trim line and tile captions in 2021, beginning to deteriorate

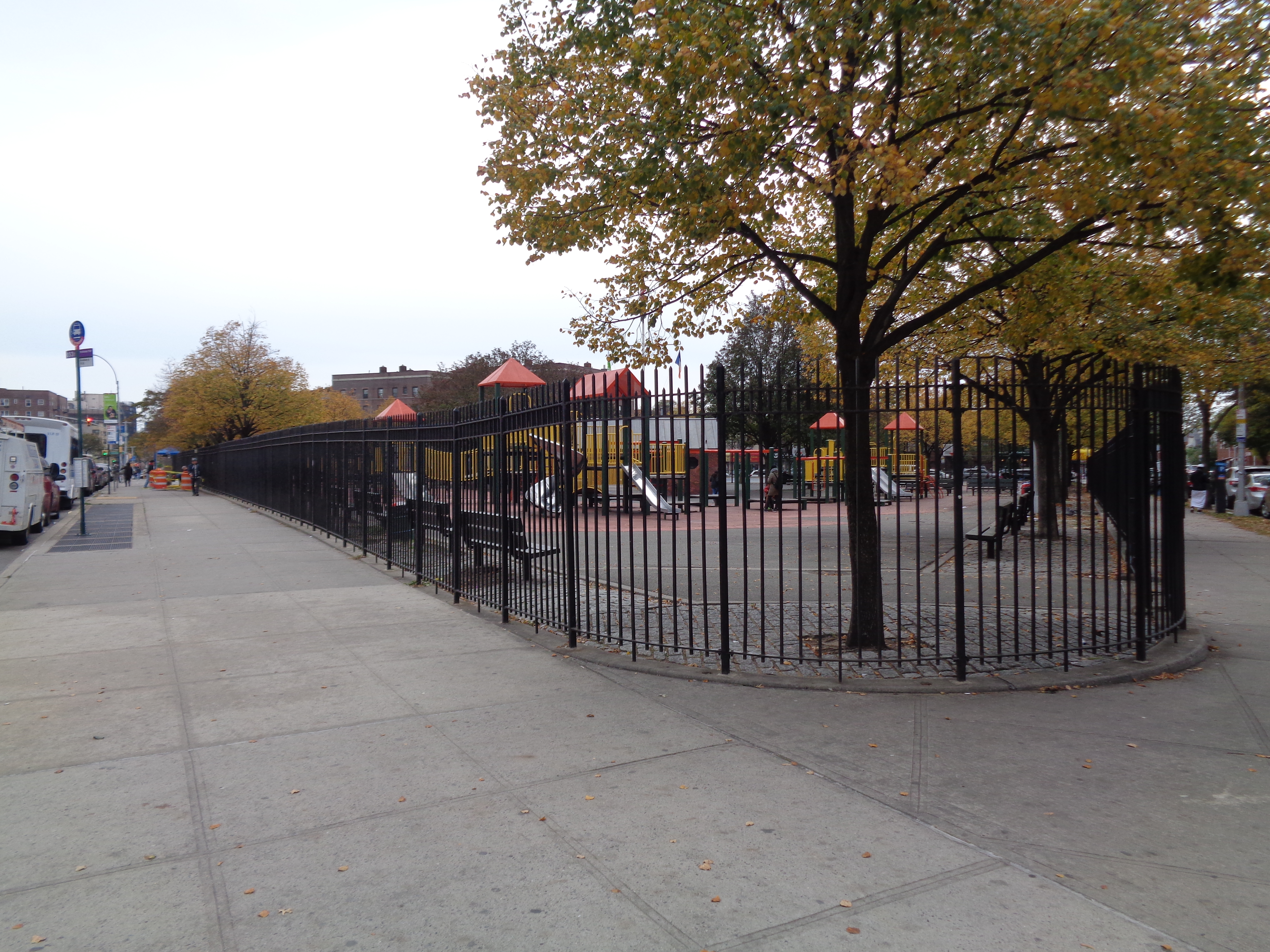
The Winfield Spur bellmouths diverge south between 78th and 79th Streets, underneath O'Connor Playground (pictured)

The Jackson Heights–Roosevelt Avenue station (signed as Roosevelt Avenue–Jackson Heights on overhead signs) is an express station on the IND Queens Boulevard Line that has four tracks and two narrow island platforms. The E and F both stop here at all times; the R stops here except at night; and the M stops here only on weekdays during the day. The M and R always make local stops, while the E and F make express stops during the day and local stops during the night. The next stop to the east (railroad north) is Elmhurst Avenue for local trains and Forest Hills–71st Avenue for express trains. The next stop to the west (railroad south) is 65th Street for local trains, Queens Plaza for express E and weekday F trains via the Queens Boulevard Line or 21st Street–Queensbridge for express weekend F trains via the 63rd Street lines.

The outer track walls have a midnight blue trim line with a black border and 2-by-10-tile white-on-black tile captions reading "ROOSEVELT" in Helvetica at regular intervals. These were installed in the renovation, and replace the original Cerulean blue trim line and 1-tile-high captions in the original IND font. The original tile band was part of a color-coded tile system used throughout the IND. The tile colors were designed to facilitate navigation for travelers going away from Lower Manhattan. As such, a different tile color is used at Forest Hills–71st Avenue, the next express station to the east; the blue tiles used at the Roosevelt Avenue station were also used at all local stations between Roosevelt Avenue and 71st Avenue.

The platforms' I-beam columns are painted blue, but some columns are encased in concrete and covered with white tiles. The fare control is in the center of the full-length mezzanine above the platforms and tracks, with unstaffed High Entry-Exit Turnstile (HEET) entrances at the southeast end of the mezzanine, and an exit with turnstiles and a booth at the northeast end. There is also a HEET entrance in the center of the mezzanine. The mezzanine has several storefronts, though most of them were unused by the early 2020s. As of 2024, one storefront included a cultural center operated by the group Los Herederos.

West of the station, there are switches between both westbound tracks; the corresponding switches for the eastbound tracks are east of the station. On both sides, there are also switches between both express tracks.

=== Unused upper level ===
Along the ramp leading to the southeastern fare control, there is an unused and uncompleted Roosevelt Avenue terminal station for the IND Second System directly above the Manhattan-bound platform. This terminal has an island platform with a trackway on each side. There are no rails in the trackbeds, but tiles depicting the station name on the tile walls are present. The signs hanging over the platform, however, are blank. East of the station lies a long, dark section of a 3-block-long tunnel with provisions for a crossover and a ramp down to the Manhattan-bound local track of the active mainline below. The unused tunnel has about 750 feet (230 m) of trackway. Along these trackways, trains from the lower level tracks can be seen. The never-used upper-level platform is around 500 feet (150 m), only long enough for eight 60-foot (18 m) cars rather than the IND maximum of 10. The platform itself has been converted to offices and storage.

There is a trackway just east of Roosevelt Avenue that diverges away from the Manhattan-bound local track. The trackway ramps up to the same level as the two trackways coming from the never-used Roosevelt Avenue Terminal, making three trackways on the upper level. The ramp flies over the mainline tracks along with the two other trackways. Between 78th and 79th Streets, the three trackways on upper level curve towards the south and ending at the wall at the edge of constructed subway. There is a diverging bellmouth next to the Jamaica-bound local track several hundred feet north of the station just at the location where the three upstairs trackways are crossing over. This bellmouth also curves towards the south and similarly ends on a concrete wall shortly after the start of the bellmouth. At the end of the unused tunnel there is an emergency exit that opens out to the south side of Broadway across the street from Elmhurst Hospital Center. The four-track subway running south was a plan for a line along the Long Island Rail Road right-of-way to Garfield Avenue and 65th Place. The line, called the Winfield Spur, would have turned along 65th Place to Fresh Pond Road and then along Fresh Pond Road to Cypress Hills Street. The line would have merged with the Myrtle–Central Avenues Line to the Rockaways proposed in 1929. All four trackways end at a concrete wall where they begin to diverge from the excavation for the existing line.

East of this station, next to the southbound track, the bellmouth with the ramp ascending to the upper level once had a layup track on it. On the Roosevelt Avenue interlocking machine in the station tower, there are spare levers for the necessary signals and switches. On the southbound local track, there is a homeball signal, "D1-1415", which has the lower portion lenses covered over and now functions as an automatic signal. The interlocking machine still shows evidence of the now-nonexistent interlocking where the Winfield spur was to have turned off from the D1 track and the D2 track.

== Victor A. Moore Bus Terminal ==
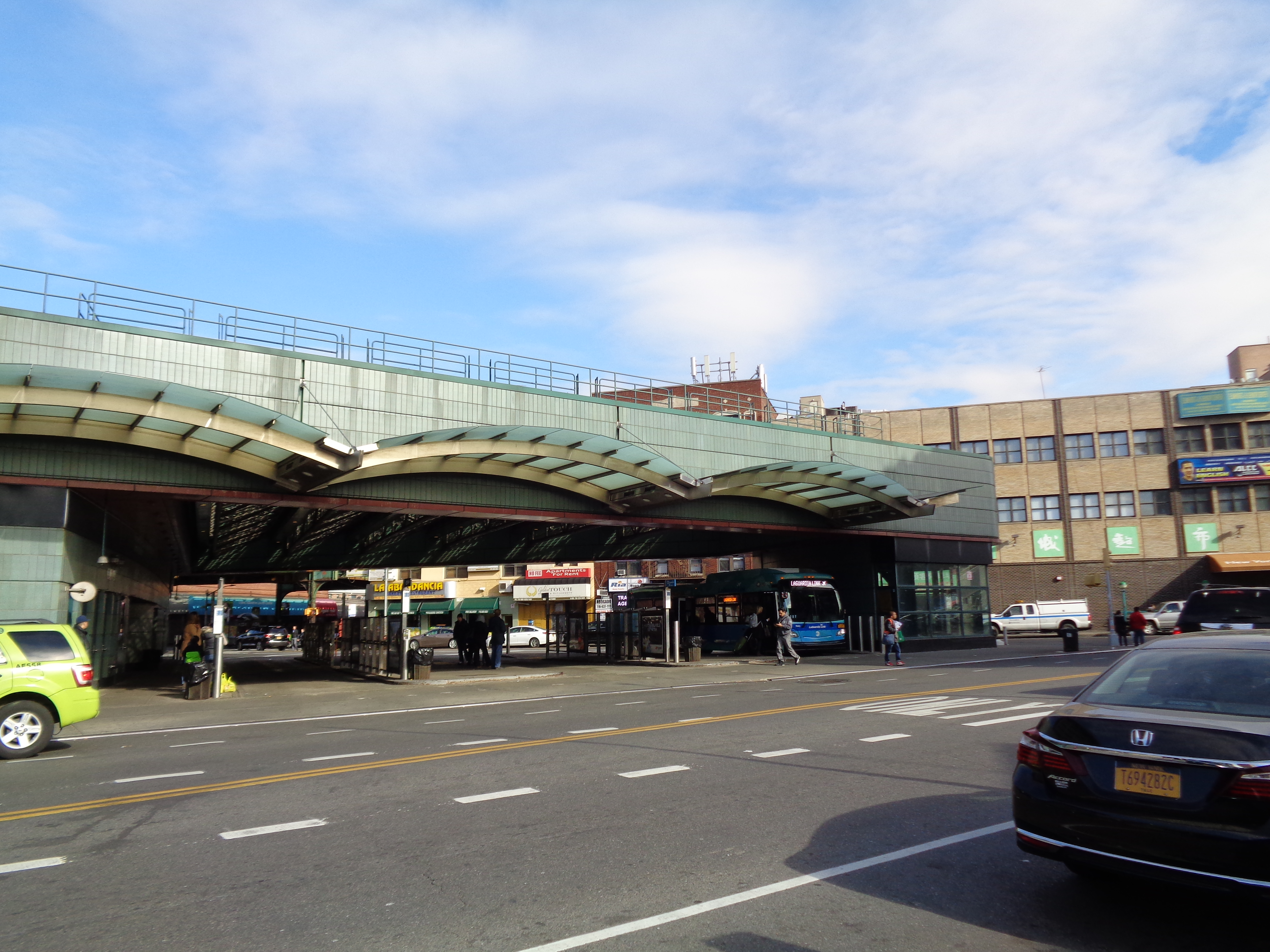
The Victor A. Moore Bus Terminal attached to the station

The Victor A. Moore Bus Terminal, which replaces the earlier building known as the Victor Moore Arcade, is located within the station building at Broadway and 74th Street. It is named after actor Victor Moore, who had funded the construction of the original arcade after winning a wager. The original two-story bus terminal and arcade, located at the triangle formed by Broadway, Roosevelt Avenue, and 75th Street, featured a shopping area. The terminal, designed in the Streamline Moderne or Art Deco style, featured bus-boarding slips at ground level and offices on the second story.

The current terminal serves six bus routes. Lanes 1 through 3, which serve three of these bus routes, are located inside the terminal. Lanes 2 and 3, which serve the Q49 and northbound Q70 SBS buses respectively, can accommodate one bus each, while Lane 1, which serves the Q33, can accommodate two buses. The Q32 and southbound Q70 SBS buses stop on Roosevelt Avenue, while the Q53 SBS and northbound Q47 stop on Broadway. The southbound Q47 stops on 75th Street. All buses from the terminal are operated by MTA Bus, successors to the Triboro Coach routes, except the Q32, which was operated by New York City Bus, before transferring to MTA Bus in June 2025. To accommodate compressed natural gas buses, the rebuilt terminal has a higher roof than the original arcade.

Lane	Route	Destination
1	Q33	LaGuardia Airport; Marine Air Terminal
2	Q49	East Elmhurst; Astoria Boulevard and 102nd Street
3	Q70 Select Bus Service/LaGuardia Link	Northbound: LaGuardia Airport; All terminals except the Marine Air Terminal
Broadway at 74th Street	Q47	Northbound: East Elmhurst; Ditmars Boulevard and 94th Street
Roosevelt Avenue at 74th Street	Q32	Westbound: Penn Station, Midtown Manhattan; West 32nd Street and 7th Avenue
Roosevelt Avenue at 74th Street	Q32	Eastbound: Jackson Heights; Northern Boulevard and 81st Street
Roosevelt Avenue at 75th Street	Q70 Select Bus Service/LaGuardia Link	Southbound: Woodside; 61st Street and Woodside Avenue
Broadway at 75th Street	Q53 Select Bus Service	Northbound: Woodside; 61st Street and Roosevelt Avenue
Broadway at 75th Street	Q53 Select Bus Service	Southbound: Rockaway Park; Beach 116th Street and Rockaway Beach Boulevard
Broadway at 75th Street	Q47	Southbound: Glendale; The Shops at Atlas Park at 81st Street and Cooper Avenue
