= IRT Flushing Line =

New York City Subway line

- The 7 and 7 Express trains, which use the Flushing Line through Midtown Manhattan, are colored purple.

Overview
- Owner: City of New York
- Locale: Manhattan and Queens, New York City
- Termini: Flushing–Main Street; 34th Street–Hudson Yards
- Stations: 22

Service
- Type: Rapid transit
- System: New York City Subway
- Operator: New York City Transit Authority
- Daily ridership: 425,688

History
- Opened: June 22, 1915; 111 years ago
- Last extension: 2015

Technical
- Num of tracks: 2–5
- Character: Underground (Manhattan, Western Queens and Main Street); Elevated (east of Hunters Point Avenue and west of Main Street, exclusive)
- Track gauge: 4 ft 8 1/2 in (1,435 mm) standard gauge
- Electrification: Third rail, 625 V DC

The IRT Flushing Line is a rapid transit route of the New York City Subway system, named for its eastern terminal in Flushing, Queens. It is operated as part of the A Division. The Interborough Rapid Transit Company (IRT), a private operator, had constructed the section of the line from Flushing, Queens, to Times Square, Manhattan between 1915 and 1928. A western extension was opened to Hudson Yards in western Manhattan in 2015, and the line now stretches from Flushing to Chelsea, Manhattan. It carries trains of the 7 local service, as well as the express <7> during rush hours in the peak direction. It is the only currently operational IRT line to serve Queens. The IRT Flushing Line has been isolated from the rest of the IRT System since June 13, 1942, when the IRT 2nd Avenue Line was closed and the track connection was destroyed. Today, for the purposes of car swapping if necessary, complicated non-revenue movements must be performed by utilizing the BMT track connection at Queensboro Plaza Station.

It is shown in the color purple on station signs, the official subway map, and internal route maps in R188 cars. Before the line was opened all the way to Flushing in 1928, it was known as the Corona Line or Woodside and Corona Line. Prior to the discontinuation of BMT services in 1949, the portion of the IRT Flushing Line between Times Square and Queensboro Plaza was known as the Queensboro Line. Since the mid-2010s, the line's signal system has been converted to an automated system.

The Flushing Line has various styles of architecture, which range from steel girder elevated structures to European-style concrete viaducts. The underground stations have some unique designs as well. The designs include Hunters Point Avenue, which is in an Italianate style; Grand Central–42nd Street, which is a single round tube similar to a London Underground station; and 34th Street–Hudson Yards, which, with its deep vault and spacious interior, resembles a Washington Metro station.

== Extent and service ==
=== Route ===
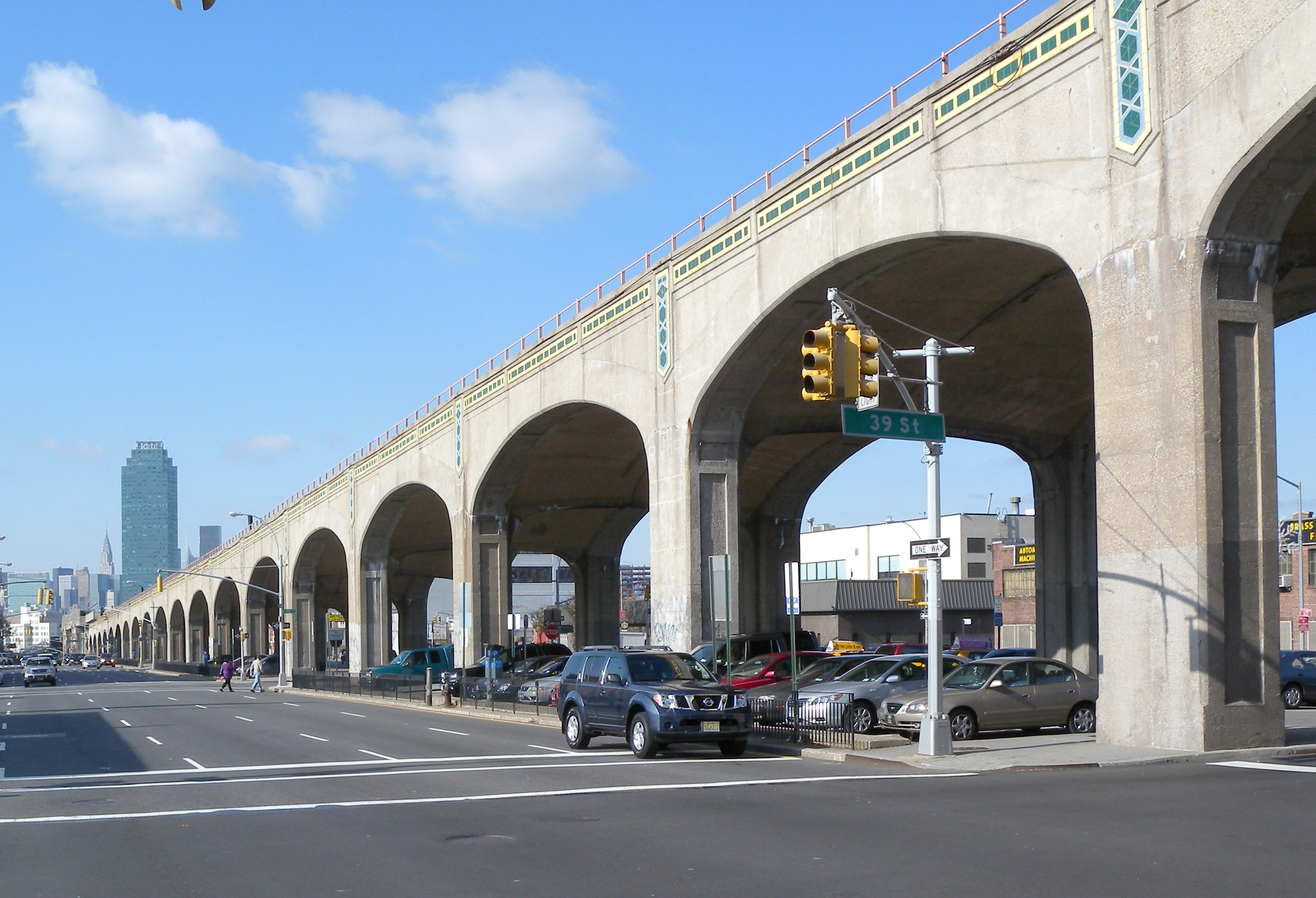
Queens Boulevard viaduct

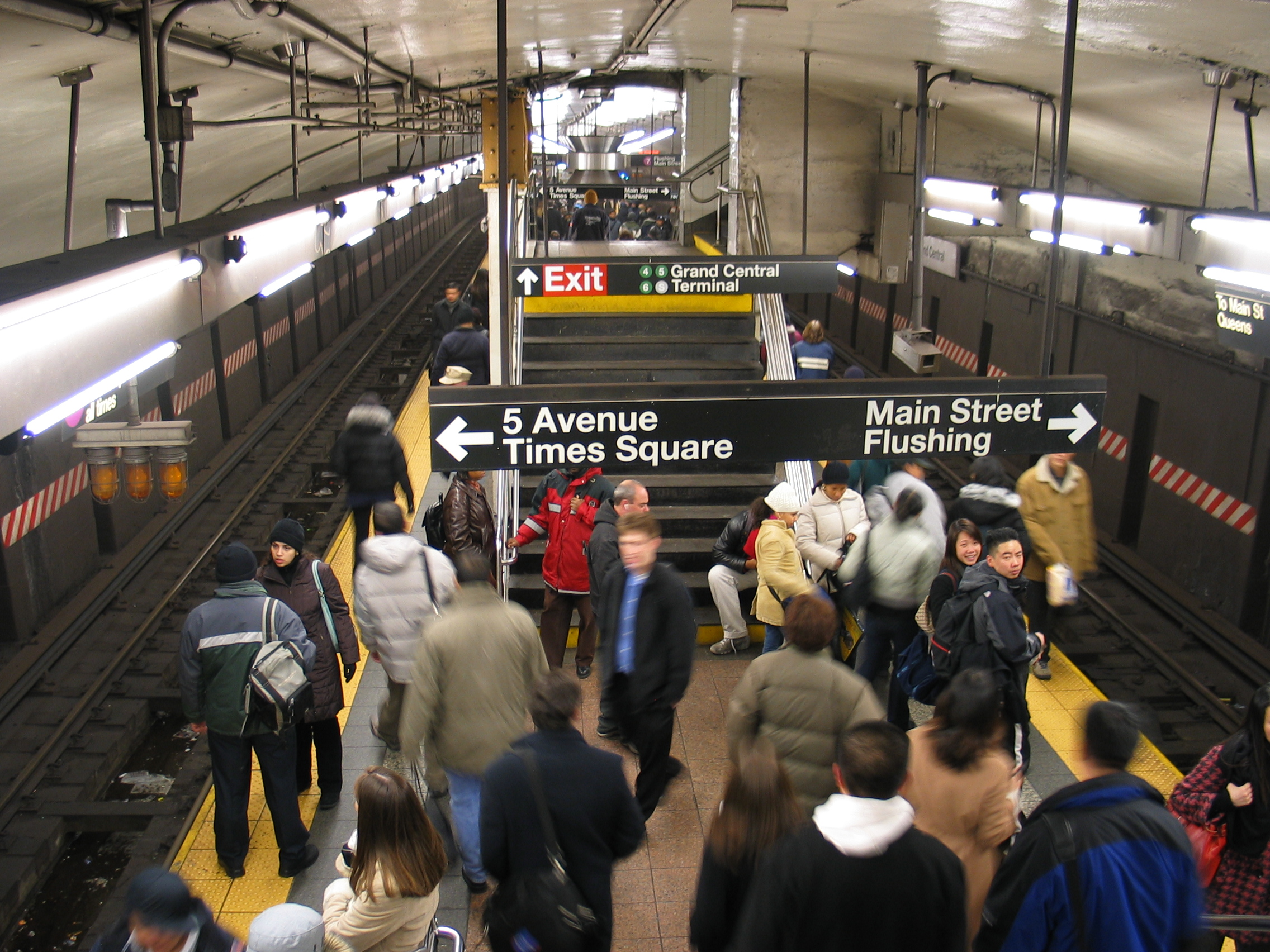
Grand Central deep vault

Services that use the Flushing Line are colored purple. The following services use part or all of the IRT Flushing Line:

Service	Time period	
Service	Rush hours, peak direction	Other times
Local	Full line	
Express	Full line	No service

The line has two distinct sections, split by the Queensboro Plaza station. It begins as a three-track subway, with the center track used for express service, at Flushing–Main Street. It quickly leaves the ground onto a steel elevated structure above Roosevelt Avenue, passing Citi Field and the United States Tennis Association's National Tennis Center. A flying junction between Mets–Willets Point and 111th Street provides access to the Corona Yard from the local tracks. At 48th Street in Sunnyside, the line switches to Queens Boulevard and an ornate concrete viaduct begins. The express track ends between 33rd Street–Rawson Street and Queensboro Plaza.

At Queensboro Plaza, the eastbound track (railroad north) is above the westbound track, with both tracks on the south side of the island platforms. On the north side of these platforms is the BMT Astoria Line. East of this point, both the Flushing Line and the Astoria Line were formerly operated by the IRT and the BMT. Connections still exist between the eastbound tracks just east of the platforms, but cannot be used for revenue service as BMT trains are wider than IRT trains. This is the only track connection between the Flushing Line and the rest of the subway system.

West of Queensboro Plaza, the line sharply turns south onto an elevated structure over 23rd Street. It heads into the west end of Amtrak's Sunnyside Yard, and passes through two underground stations before entering Manhattan via the Steinway Tunnel under the East River. In Manhattan, the line runs under 42nd Street, with part directly underneath the 42nd Street Shuttle (S train), before angling towards 41st Street. The Times Square–42nd Street station, with no track connections to other lines, is directly under 41st Street.

West of Times Square, the tracks curve sharply downward before turning under 11th Avenue. The tracks end at 24th Street, even though the last station is at 34th Street. This segment was built as part of the extension of the Flushing Line west to Manhattan's Far West Side (see § Extension westward). A decommissioned lower level at the IND Eighth Avenue Line's 42nd Street–Port Authority Bus Terminal station formerly blocked the way. Although London ultimately received the bid for the 2012 Summer Olympics, New York City pursued the extension anyway, albeit as a means to enable the redevelopment of the far West Side under the Hudson Yards Redevelopment Project.

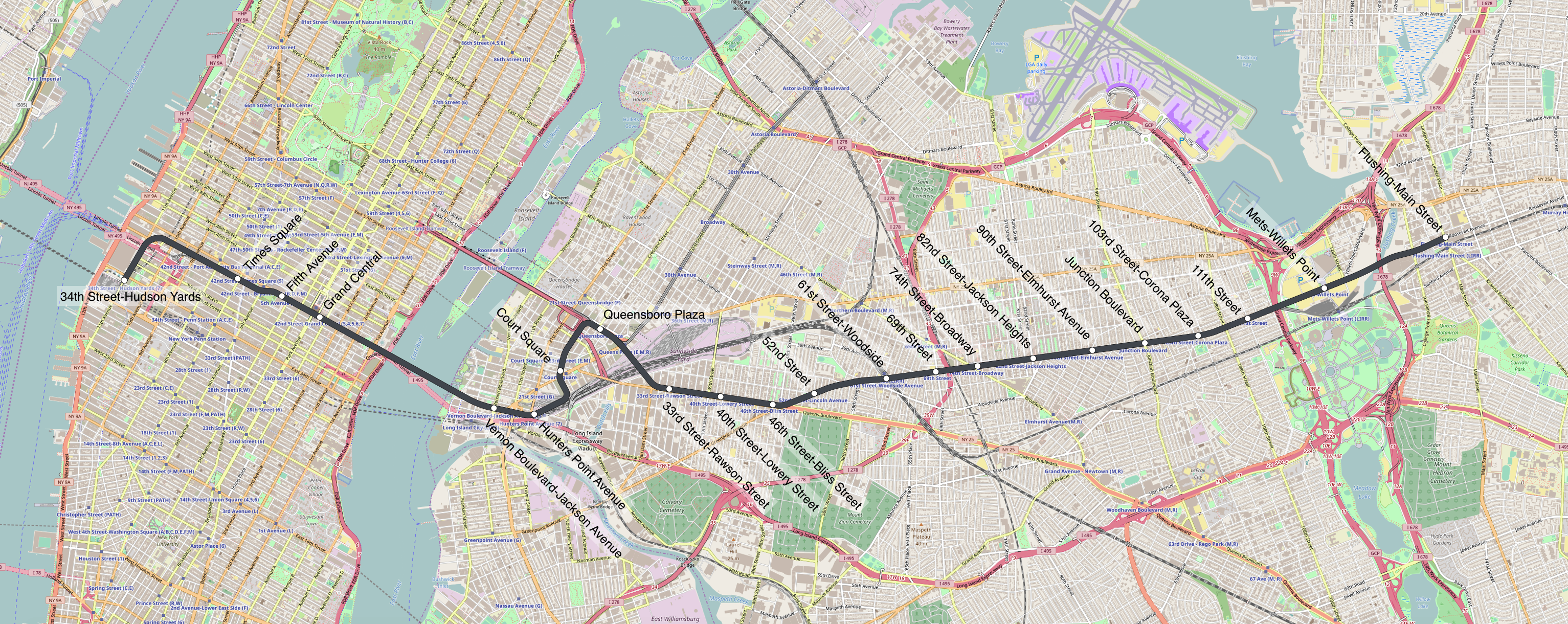
Overview of the IRT Flushing Line

=== Distinctions ===
The Flushing Line is one of only two New York City non-shuttle subway lines that hosts only a single service and does not share operating trackage with any other line or service; the other is the BMT Canarsie Line, carrying the L train. Because of this, the MTA is automating the line with new trains using communication-based train control (CBTC), similar to the Canarsie Line (see § Automation of the line).

The IRT Flushing Line's 7 service has the distinction of running trains with the largest number of cars in the New York City Subway. 7 trains are eleven cars long; most other New York City Subway services run ten or eight-car trains. The trains are not the longest by total length, however. An IND/BMT train of ten 60-foot (18 m)-long cars or eight 75-foot (23 m)-long cars, which is 600 feet (180 m) long, is still 35 feet (11 m) longer than an IRT train of eleven 51.4-foot (15.7 m)-long cars, which is 565 feet (172 m) long.

== History ==
=== Origins ===
The earliest origins of the Flushing Line emerged on February 22, 1885, with the founding of the East River Tunnel Railroad. The railroad would construct the Steinway Tunnel under the East River, connecting the Long Island Rail Road in Queens with the New York Central Railroad in Manhattan. However, the East River Tunnel Railroad Company went out of business. On July 22, 1887, Walter S. Gurnee and Malcolm W. Niven founded the New York and Long Island Railroad Company (NY&LIRR). They soon began planning for the tunnel.

To run from West 42nd Street and Tenth Avenue to Van Alst Avenue after crossing under the East River, the builders planned for the remainder of the line to be constructed on private lands, and numerous alterations were made to the proposal. In 1890, William Steinway advised the company to utilize electricity to power the tunnels, believing that the construction of the tunnel would increase the value of his properties in the vicinity.

On June 3, 1892, construction of the tunnel commenced near the intersection of 50th Avenue and Vernon and Jackson Avenues. However, several failures and hindrances, which included an underground spring preventing the extraction of rubble, resulted in the termination of the project on February 2, 1893. Several calls for the resumption of the project between 1893 and 1896, in addition to a proposed extension to New Jersey, were futile. Work resumed in 1905, and test runs with streetcars began in 1907. Though the streetcar tests were successful, the tunnel remained closed to passengers. The tunnel opened for subway use on June 22, 1915, with service running between Grand Central and Vernon–Jackson Avenues.

The Flushing Line was extended one stop from Vernon–Jackson Avenues to Hunters Point Avenue on February 15, 1916. On November 5, 1916, the Flushing Line was extended two more stops to the east to the Queensboro Plaza station. At this point, the Flushing Line between Grand Central and Queensboro Plaza was called the Queensboro Line.

=== Construction under the Dual Contracts ===
The Dual Contracts were formalized in March 1913, specifying new lines or expansions to be built by the IRT and the Brooklyn Rapid Transit Company (BRT). The Dual Contracts involved opening the Steinway Tunnel as part of the new Flushing subway line. The route, traveling under 41st and 42nd Streets in Manhattan, was to go from Times Square through the tunnel over to Long Island City and from there continue toward Flushing.

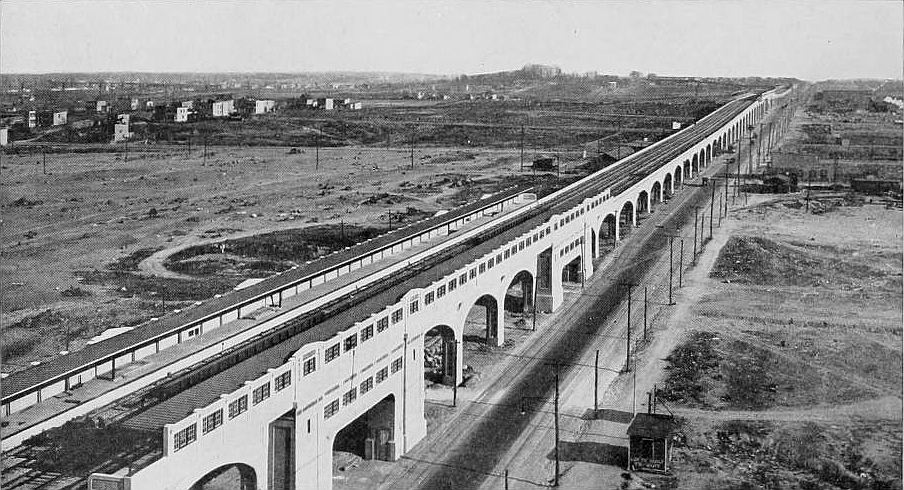
The IRT Flushing Line at 33rd Street–Rawson Street, seen in 1920

At Queensboro Plaza, the line met the BMT's 60th Street Tunnel, as well as a spur from the elevated IRT Second Avenue Line on the Queensboro Bridge. From this point east, the Flushing and Astoria Lines were built by the City of New York as part of the Dual Contracts. They were officially IRT lines on which the BMT held irrevocable and equal trackage rights. Because BMT trains were wider, and the platforms had been built for the IRT, normal BMT trains ran only to Queensboro Plaza, with a transfer to shuttles, using elevated cars, that alternated between the Astoria–Ditmars Boulevard and Flushing–Main Street terminals. IRT trains simply continued from the Queensboro Line and Queensboro Bridge onto the lines to Astoria and Flushing. The line to Flushing was originally called the Corona Line or Woodside and Corona Line before it was completed to Flushing. The segment of the viaduct above Queens Boulevard, from 33rd to 48th streets, was made of concrete rather than steel because it was intended to serve as a gateway to Queens.

The line was opened from Queensboro Plaza to Alburtis Avenue on April 21, 1917. The Flushing Line was initially derided by opponents, as it passed through agricultural areas rather than connecting populated places, as previous lines had. Rapid development quickly followed once the Flushing Line was operational, with six-story apartment buildings being erected directly on the former fields, and several major firms building housing for their workers along the route. By June 1917 ridership on the line was exceeding expectations, with 363,726 passengers using the Corona Line that month, 126,100 using the Queensboro Plaza station, and 363,508 using the Queensboro Subway.

BMT shuttles began to use the Flushing and Astoria Lines on April 8, 1923. Service to 111th Street was inaugurated on October 13, 1925, with shuttle service running between 111th Street and the previous terminal at Alburtis Avenue (now 103rd Street–Corona Plaza) on the Manhattan-bound track. The line to Main Street had been practically completed at this point, but had to be rebuilt in part due to the sinking of the foundations of the structure in the vicinity of Flushing Creek. Once the structure was deemed to be safe for operation, the line was extended to Willets Point Boulevard on May 7, 1927. This extension was served by shuttle trains until through service was inaugurated on May 14. On that date, the opening of the station was formally celebrated; it coincided with the opening of the Roosevelt Avenue Bridge for cars and buses. Wooden elevated rolling stock had to be used by the BMT, as the Flushing Line was built to IRT clearances, and standard steel BMT subway rolling stock were not compatible.

==== Western expansion ====
In July 1920, the New York State Public Service Commission announced it would extend the Flushing Line two stops west to Times Square, with an intermediate station under Bryant Park. The western end of the Bryant Park station would be 300 feet (91 m) east of Sixth Avenue, while the eastern end would be about 100 feet (30 m) west of Fifth Avenue. The 42nd Street Association, a local civic group, regarded the station as very important. In May 1921, it was expected that contracts for the extension would be advertised shortly.

On November 9, 1921, the New York State Transit Commission opened up the contract for the extension for bidding. The extension would take a slightly different route than the one specified in the Dual Contracts. The original proposal had the line constructed under 42nd Street to a point just to the east of Broadway, which would have forced riders transferring to the IRT Broadway–Seventh Avenue Line to walk a long distance.

The Times Square station would be designed at a lower level than the two existing stations at Times Square. It would have two upper mezzanines connected by passageways: a mezzanine east of Seventh Avenue extending to Broadway, and one west of Seventh Avenue. Escalators would connect these upper mezzanines with the lower mezzanine, and a provision would be made to permit the installation of an escalator to the east of Seventh Avenue. There would be two entrances at street level at each of the western corners of 41st Street and Broadway, and two entrances at the northeastern corner of 41st Street and Seventh Avenue.

On November 22, 1921, the Powers-Kennedy Contracting Corporation was awarded a contract to construct the extension on a low bid of $3,867,138, below the estimated cost of over $4 million. This low bid was the narrowest margin ever recorded for any large city contract, beating out the next highest bidder by 0.7 percent. While the contractor was provided four years to complete work, engineers expected to reduce the time needed to do so to as little as three years. Since work on the project had to be completed underneath the foundations of several large buildings, such as theatres, and the north end of the New York Public Library, the contractor had to provide a $1 million bond.

The project was expected to reduce crowding on the 42nd Street Shuttle by enabling riders to use the Queensboro Subway to directly access Times Square. 24,000 of the estimated 100,000 daily shuttle riders transferred to and from the Queensboro Subway. The line was to extend as far as Eighth Avenue to connect with the proposed IND Eighth Avenue Line.

Powers-Kennedy started excavating the line westward from Grand Central in May 1922. The Flushing Line extension was to run beneath the original line from Vanderbilt to Fifth Avenue, running as little as 4 inches (100 mm) under the original line. The tunnel also had to pass under a sewage line at Madison Avenue. The construction of the Fifth Avenue station required underpinning the New York Public Library Main Branch and extending the library's foundation downward. The subway tunnel ran 35 feet (11 m) below ground level. During construction, workers took precautions to avoid interrupting the flow of traffic above ground and interfering with preexisting tunnels. The contractors had completed the tunnels to Fifth Avenue by May 1923. Local civic groups advocated for the Fifth Avenue station to be used as a temporary terminal while the permanent terminus at Times Square was being completed. By the end of 1923, the Transit Commission had allocated $50,000 for the construction of a temporary crossover east of the Fifth Avenue station.

The temporary terminal at Fifth Avenue was nearly complete by February 1926. The station had two entrances on the south side of 42nd Street (one next to the library and the other next to the park). A third entrance was placed within the Stern Brothers building on the north side. Stern's funded the construction of the entrance inside its building, which also included storefront windows. These entrances connected with a mezzanine above the platform. The platform was to be 480 feet (150 m) long, though only a 300-foot (91 m) section would be used initially.

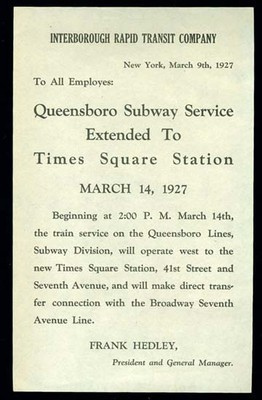
Queensboro Subway Service Extended To Times Square station 1927

The Fifth Avenue station opened on March 22, 1926, extending the IRT Flushing Line one stop to the west from the line's previous terminus at Grand Central. In fall 1926, it was announced that the line would be completed by January 1, 1927.

On February 8, 1927, the New York City Board of Transportation informed the New York State Transit Commission that work on the Times Square station was sufficiently completed to enable the start of train service beginning on February 19, 1927 with the completion of work to a point between Eighth Avenue and Seventh Avenue. Plans for the construction of an extension of the line to between Eighth Avenue and Ninth Avenue to provide a physical connection with the IND Eighth Avenue Line were underway.

On March 1, 1927, the opening of the line was set for March 15, the third time an opening date was set for the line. Work had been postponed given the amount of work that remained to be completed. The opening of the line was about a year behind the April 29, 1926 date specified in the contract. The delay was the result of surprisingly difficult construction. The Board of Transportation had withheld retained percentages, as allowed in the contract, penalizing the contractor, and trying to incentivize it to speed up work. No retained percentages were provided to the contractor until February 1927. The Flushing Line was extended to Times Square on March 14, 1927.

==== Eastern expansion ====
The eastern extension to Flushing–Main Street opened on January 21, 1928. At this time, Corona Yard opened, with the inspection shed and some yard tracks available for use. The remaining tracks opened on April 16, 1928.

For the 1939 New York World's Fair, the Willets Point Boulevard station was rebuilt and centered on 123rd Street, just west of where the station originally lay. Some remnants of the old station are still visible; ironwork tends to indicate where the older outside-platform stations were, and the remains of the fare entry area can be seen east of the current station. The original Willets Point Boulevard station was a "minor" stop on the Flushing Line; it had only two stairways and short station canopies at platform level. It was rebuilt into the much larger station in use today, and the ramp used during two World's Fairs still exists, but is only used during special events, such as the US Open for tennis. Express service to the World's Fair began on the Flushing Line on April 24, 1939.

Currently and historically, the IRT assigned the number 7 to its Flushing Line subway service, though this did not appear on any equipment until the introduction of the R12 rolling stock in 1948. The BMT assigned the number 9 to its service, used on maps but not signed on trains.

==== Unrealized eastern expansion ====
The Main Street station was not intended to be the Flushing Line's terminus. While the controversy over an elevated line in Flushing was ongoing in January 1913, the Whitestone Improvement Association pushed for an elevated to Whitestone, College Point, and Bayside. However, some members of that group wanted to oppose the Flushing line's construction if there was not going to be an extension to Whitestone. In January 1913, groups representing communities in south Flushing collaborated to push for an elevated along what was then the LIRR's Central Branch, in the current right-of-way of Kissena Corridor Park. Shortly after, the New York Public Service Commission (PSC) announced its intent to extend the line as an el from Corona to Flushing, with a possible further extension to Little Neck Bay in Bayside. There was consensus that the line should not abruptly end in Corona, but even with the 5.5-mile-long (8.9 km) extension to Bayside, the borough would still have fewer Dual Contracts route mileage than either Brooklyn or the Bronx. The New York Times wrote that compared to the Bronx, Queens would have far less subway mileage per capita even with the Flushing extension.

The Bayside extension was tentatively approved in June 1913, but only after the construction of the initial extension to Flushing. Under the revised subway expansion plan put forth in December 1913, the Flushing Line would be extended past Main Street, along and/or parallel to the right-of-way of the nearby Port Washington Branch of the LIRR towards Bell Boulevard in Bayside. A spur line would branch off north along 149th Street towards College Point.

In 1914, the PSC chairman and the commissioner committed to building the line toward Bayside. However, at the time, the LIRR and IRT were administered separately, and the IRT plan would require rebuilding a section of the Port Washington branch between the Broadway and Auburndale stations. The LIRR moved to block the IRT extension past Flushing since it would compete with the Port Washington Branch service in Bayside. One member of the United Civic Association submitted a proposal to the LIRR to let the IRT use the Port Washington Branch to serve Flushing and Bayside, using a connection between the two lines in Corona. The PSC supported the connection as an interim measure, and on March 11, 1915, it voted to let the Bayside connection be built. Subsequently, engineers surveying the planned intersection of the LIRR and IRT lines found that the IRT land would not actually overlap with any LIRR land. The LIRR president at the time, Ralph Peters, offered to lease the Port Washington and Whitestone Branches to the IRT for rapid transit use for $250,000 annually (equivalent to $7,960,000 in 2025), excluding other maintenance costs. The lease would last for ten years, with an option to extend the lease by ten more years. The PSC favored the idea of the IRT being a lessee along these lines, but did not know where to put the Corona connection. Even the majority of groups in eastern Queens supported the lease plan. The only group who opposed the lease agreement was the Flushing Association, who preferred a previous plan to build the Corona Line extension as a subway under Amity Street (currently Roosevelt Avenue), ending at Main Street.

Afterward, the PSC largely ignored the lease plan since it was still focused on building the first phase of the Dual Contracts. The Flushing Business Men's Association kept advocating for the Amity Street subway, causing a schism between them and the rest of the groups that supported the LIRR lease. Through the summer of 1915, the PSC and the LIRR negotiated the planned lease to $125,000 a first year, equivalent to $3,980,000 in 2025, with an eight percent increase each year; the negotiations then stalled in 1916. The Whitestone Improvement Association, impatient with the pace of negotiations, approved of the subway under Amity Street even though it would not serve them directly. The PSC's chief engineer wrote in a report that a combined 20,600 riders would use the Whitestone and Bayside lines each day in either direction, and that by 1927, there would be 34,000 riders per day per direction. The Third Ward Rapid Transit Association wrote a report showing how much they had petitioned for Flushing subway extensions to that point, compared to how little progress they had made in doing so. Negotiations continued to be stalled in 1917. Despite the line not having been extended past Corona yet, the idea of a subway extension to Little Neck encouraged development there.

The Whitestone Branch would have had to be rebuilt if it were leased to the subway, with railroad crossings removed and the single track doubled. The PSC located 14 places where crossings needed to be eliminated. However, by early 1917, there was barely enough money to build the subway to Flushing, let alone a link to Whitestone and Bayside. A lease agreement was announced on October 16, 1917, but the IRT withdrew from the agreement a month later, citing that it was inappropriate to enter such an agreement at that time. Thereafter, the PSC instead turned its attention back to the Main Street subway extension.

Even after the Main Street station opened in 1928, efforts to extend the line past Flushing persisted. In 1928, the New York City Board of Transportation (BOT) proposed allowing IRT trains to build a connection to use the Whitestone Branch, but the IRT did not accept the offer since this would entail upgrading railroad crossings and the single-tracked line. Subsequently, the LIRR abandoned the branch in 1932. As part of the 1929 IND Second System plan, the Flushing Line would have had branches to College Point and Bayside east of Main Street. That plan was revived in 1939. The BOT kept proposing an extension of the Flushing Line past Main Street until 1945, when World War II ended and new budgets did not allow for a Flushing extension. Since then, several New York City Transit Authority proposals for an eastward extension have all failed.

=== Service curtailments and slight improvements ===
Second Avenue Line service, including the connection across the Queensboro Bridge, ended June 13, 1942, and free transfers to the IRT Third Avenue Line were offered at Grand Central. These transfers were valid until May 12, 1955, when Third Avenue Line service ended.

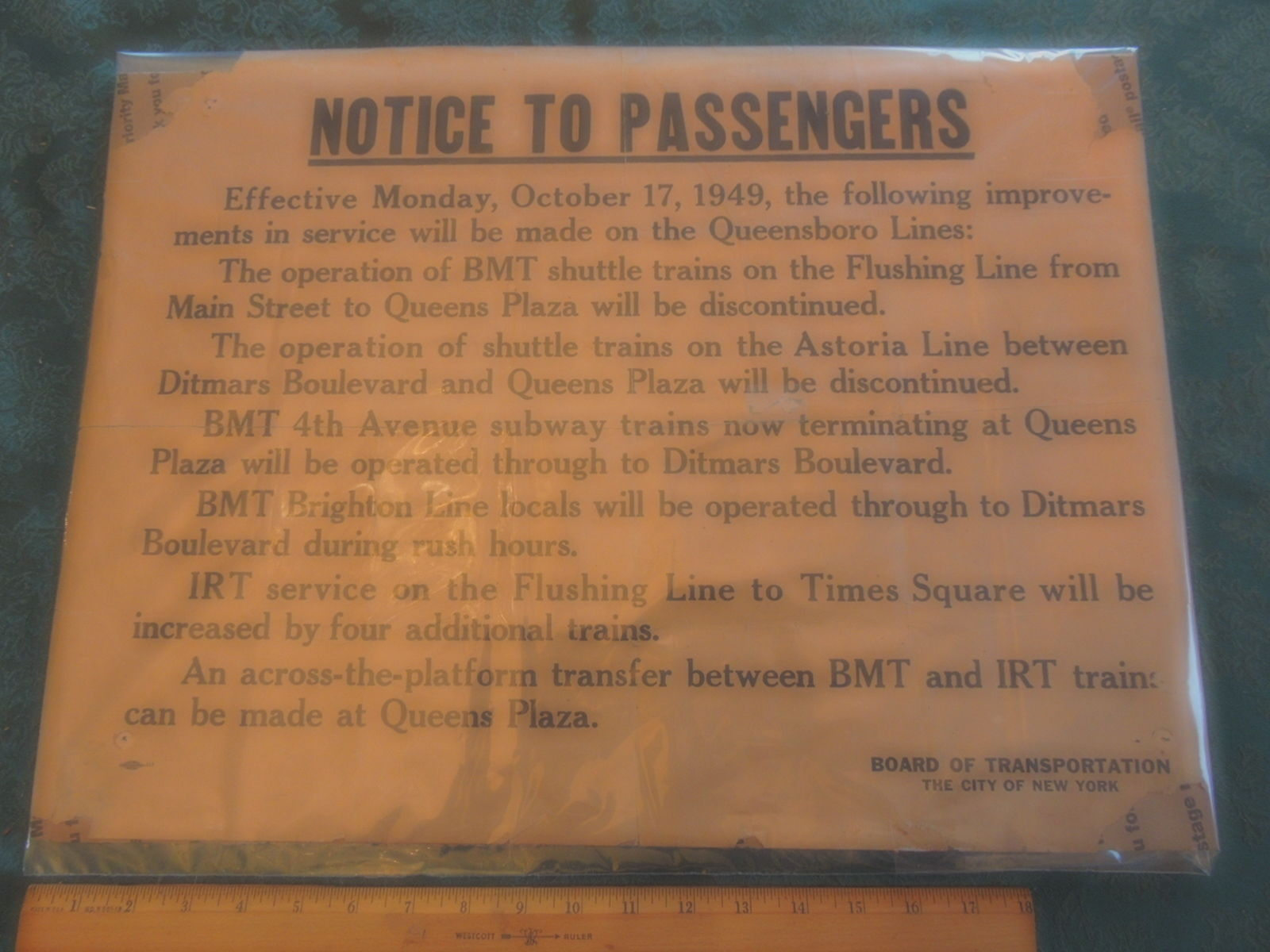
A poster describing the changes at Queensborough Plaza in 1949

On October 17, 1949, the joint BMT/IRT service arrangement ended. The Flushing Line became the responsibility of IRT. The Astoria Line had its platforms shaved back, and became BMT-only. Because of this, routes through the then eight-track Queensboro Plaza station were consolidated and the northern half of the structure was later torn down. Evidence of where the torn-down platforms were, as well as the trackways that approached this area, can still be seen in the ironwork at the station.

During the joint service period, the elevated stations on the Astoria and Flushing Lines were only able to fit nine 51-foot-long BMT elevated or IRT cars, the rough equivalent of seven 67-foot-long BMT subway cars. After the BMT/IRT dual services ended in 1949, the New York City Board of Transportation announced that the Flushing Line platforms would be lengthened to 11 IRT car lengths, and the Astoria Line platforms extended to 9 BMT car lengths. The project, to start in 1950, would cost $3.85 million.

Identification of Trains and Routing Automatically (IDENTRA) was implemented on the line in the 1957 and used until 1997, when a route selector punch box with B1 Astoria, local/express buttons was installed at the 10/11 car marker on the upper level of Queensboro Plaza. IDENTRA used a removable round circular disc type radio antenna assembly, slide-mounted on the small mounting brackets that were attached on the front of R12, R14, R15, and R17 cars that were assigned to the 7 route, which had been used on the line since 1948. Similar to the use of radio transponders in the CBTC installation, the system used the antennas to determine whether a train was running local or express, and then accordingly switched the track at interlockings near the Queensboro Plaza and Flushing–Main Street stations. This move reduced the number of signal towers on the line from 9 to 2 and theoretically allowed to operate 37 eleven-car trains instead of only 30 nine-car trains per hour. The consolidated signal system was in use by 1956 while the selector system was in service by 1958. However, in practice, train frequencies were not necessarily increased. According to an experiment performed by the Long Island Star Journal in 1957, rush-hour headways ranged from 6 to 15 minutes between local trains, and 2 to 6 minutes between express trains.

In 1953, with increased ridership on the line, a "super-express" service was instituted on the line. The next year, the trains were lengthened to nine cars each. Subsequently, the trains were extended to ten cars on November 1, 1962. With the 1964–1965 World's Fair in Flushing Meadows–Corona Park in April 1964, trains were lengthened to eleven cars. The Flushing Line received 430 new R33S and R36 cars for this enhanced service.

Rolling stock along the Flushing Line received "strip maps" in 1965, the first such installation in the system. The strip maps showed only the stations on the Flushing Line, as opposed to for the entire system, but the transfers available at each station were listed.

=== Decline and rehabilitation ===
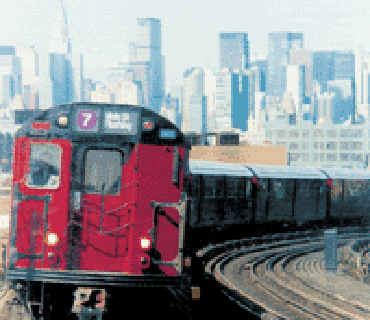
A 7 train of R36 cars at 33rd Street–Rawson Street, in the Redbird paint scheme

As with much of the rest of the subway system, the IRT Flushing Line was allowed to deteriorate throughout the 1970s to the late 1980s. Structural defects that required immediate attention at the time were labeled as "Code Red" defects or "Red Tag" areas, and were numerous on the Flushing Line. Some columns that supported elevated structures on the Flushing Line were so shaky that trains did not run when the wind speed exceeded 65 miles per hour (105 km/h). This was particularly widespread on the Flushing and the BMT Jamaica Lines.

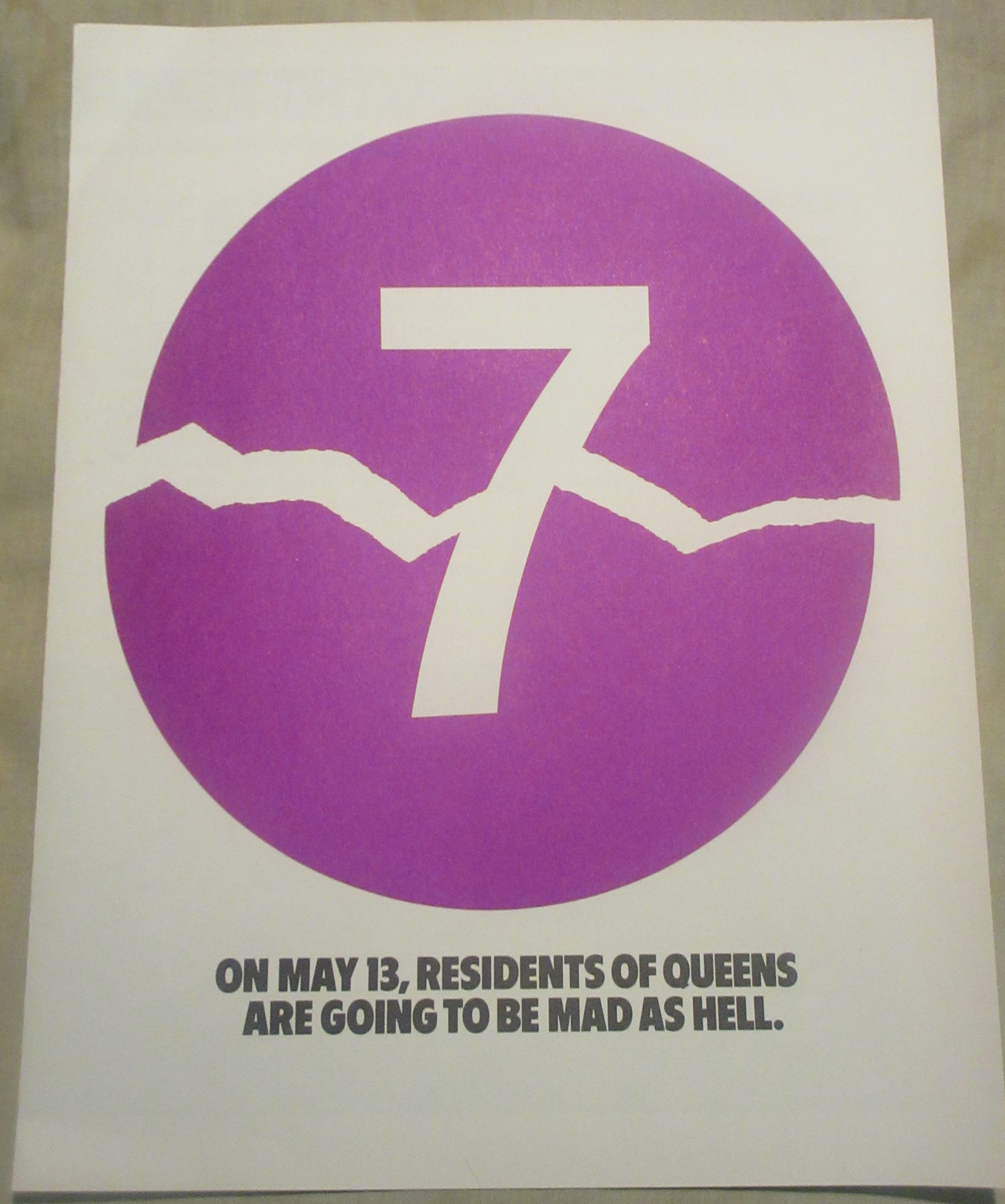
Poster announcing the Flushing Line rehabilitation project in 1985.

On May 13, 1985, a 4 1/2-year-long, $70 million project to overhaul the IRT Flushing Line commenced. It forced single-tracking on much of the line during weekends, and the elimination of express service for the duration of the project. The MTA advertised this change by putting leaflets in the New York Times, the Staten Island Advance, the Daily News, and Newsday. The project laid new track, replaced or repaired concrete and steel structures, replaced wooden station canopies with aluminum, improved lighting, improved signage, and installed new ventilation and pumping equipment. Expanded service was provided when the Mets played home games or when there were sporting events in Flushing Meadows–Corona Park. Paradoxically, Flushing local trains had better on-time performance during the construction than before it started.

The $70 million rehabilitation project on the Queens Boulevard concrete viaduct was completed six months early, and <7> express service was restored on August 21, 1989, without stopping at 61st Street–Woodside. This led to protests by community members to get express service back at 61st Street station. The reason for the discontinuance on the Flushing express was because the MTA felt it took too long to transfer between locals and expresses. The service was also due to fears of delays on the line when locals and expresses merged after 33rd Street–Rawson Street. The change was supposed to enable local trains to stop at 61st Street every four minutes (15 trains per hour) during rush hours, but according to riders, the trains arrived every 8–10 minutes. The community opposition led to service changes, and expresses began stopping at Woodside again a few months later.

On weekends between January 19 and March 11, 7 service was partially shutdown so that switches at the Fisk Interlocking could be replaced. The $5 million project was not done in conjunction with the work between 1985 and 1989 because the 23-year old switches were not due for replacement.

In the mid-1990s, the MTA discovered that the Queens Boulevard viaduct structure was unstable, as rocks that were used to support the tracks as ballast became loose due to poor drainage, which, in turn, affected the integrity of the concrete structure overall. <7> express service was suspended again between 61st Street–Woodside and Queensboro Plaza; temporary platforms were installed to access the express track in the four intermediate stations. The work began on April 5, 1993. When the viaduct reconstruction finished on March 31, 1997, full <7> express service was reinstated. Throughout this entire period, ridership grew steadily.

In spring 2018, express service west of 74th Street was suspended temporarily so the MTA could fix the supports under the center track at 61st Street.

=== Early 21st century upgrades ===
==== Automation of the line ====
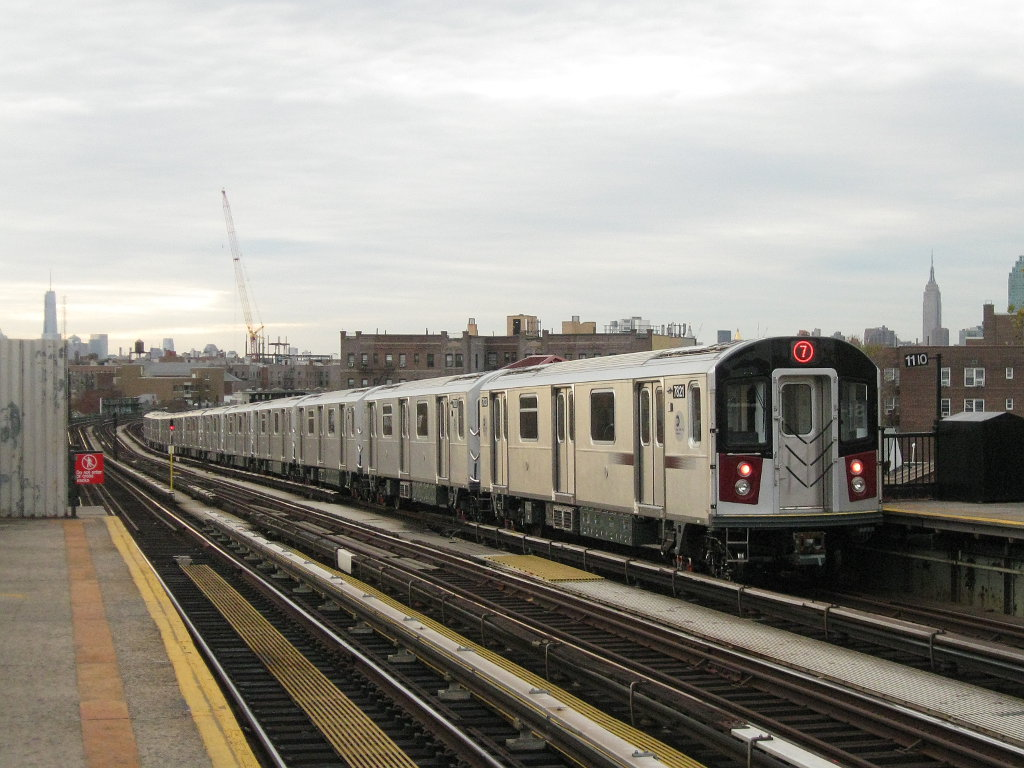
The automation of the Flushing Line required the purchase of the R188 orders on the 7 route, which runs on the Flushing Line

In January 2012, the MTA selected Thales for a $343 million contract to set up a communications-based train control (CBTC) system as part of the plan to automate the line. This was the second installation of CBTC, following a successful implementation on the BMT Canarsie Line. The total cost was $550 million for the signals and other trackside infrastructure, and $613.7 million for CBTC-compliant rolling stock. The safety assessment at system level was performed using the formal method Event-B.

The MTA chose the Flushing Line for the next implementation of CBTC because it is also a self-contained line with no direct connections to other subway lines currently in use. Funding was allocated in the 2010–2014 capital budget for CBTC installation on the Flushing Line, with scheduled installation completion in 2016. The R188 cars were ordered so the line would have compatible rolling stock. CBTC on the line will allow the 7 and <7> services to run 7% more service, or 2 more trains per hour (tph) during peak hours (before retrofit, it ran 27 tph). However, the system had been retrofitted to operate at 33 tph even without CBTC.

The first train of R188 cars began operating in passenger service on November 9, 2013. Test runs of R188s in automated mode started in late 2014. However, the CBTC retrofit date was later pushed back to 2017 or 2018 after a series of problems that workers encountered during installation, including problems with the R188s. The project also went over budget, costing $405 million for a plan originally marked at $265.6 million. The whole line was cutover to CBTC operation on November 26, 2018, with the completion of the segment from Hudson Yards to the north of Grand Central.

Completely independent of the CBTC installation is the 7 Subway Extension, which features both CBTC signals and fixed-block signaling. The extension also increased line capacity.

==== Extension westward ====
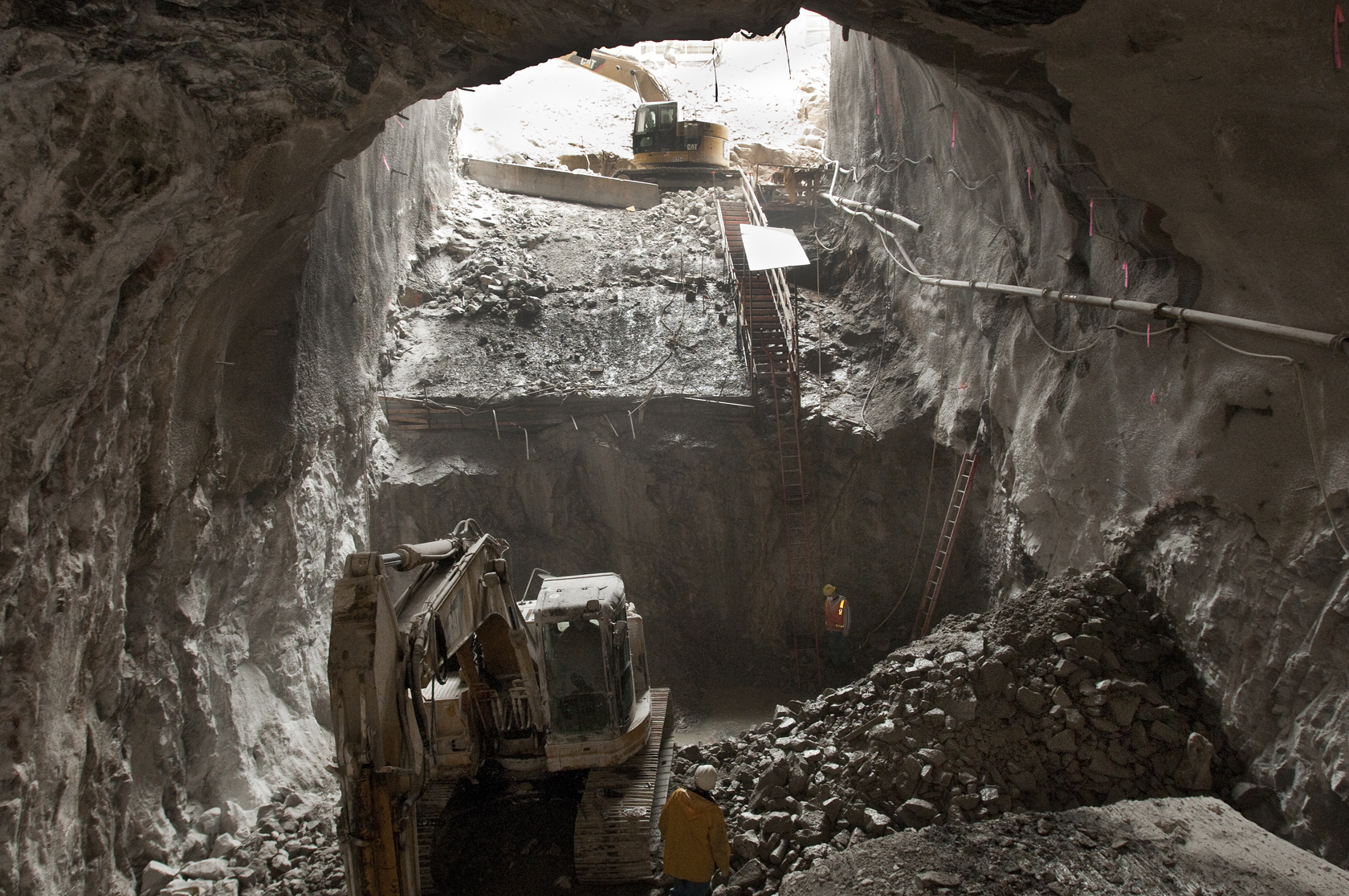
Construction of the 7 Subway Extension

In the 1990s, the Metropolitan Transportation Authority (MTA) began exploring the possibility of a Flushing Line extension to New Jersey. In 2001, a business and civic group convened by Senator Charles Schumer argued that a proposed westward extension of the Midtown office district could not be accomplished without a subway extension, saying:

The long blocks along the avenues make the walk as long as 20 minutes to the westernmost parts of the area. In addition, there is no convenient link from Grand Central Station or elsewhere on the east side of Manhattan, making the Far West Side a difficult commute for workers from parts of Manhattan, Queens, Westchester and Connecticut.

An extension of the Flushing Line was then proposed as part of the New York City bid for the 2012 Summer Olympics. The City wanted to get funding before July 2005, at which time the International Olympic Committee would vote on funding, but due to budget shortfalls, the MTA could not pay to fund the extension. After New York City lost their Olympic bid, the government of New York City devised a rezoning plan for the Hudson Yards area and proposed two new subway stations to serve that area. The subway extension was approved following the successful rezoning of about 60 blocks from 28th to 43rd Streets, which became the Hudson Yards neighborhood. In October 2007, the MTA awarded a $1.145 billion contract to build an extension from Times Square to Hudson Yards.

There is one new station at 34th Street and Eleventh Avenue to serve Hudson Yards. The MTA originally planned for another station at 10th Avenue and 41st Street but eliminated it due to lack of funding. The extension's opening was delayed several times due to issues in installing the custom-made incline elevators for the 34th Street station. The extension eventually opened on September 13, 2015. The 34th Street–Hudson Yards station's design has been compared to that of Washington Metro stations, or to those of stations along London's Jubilee Line Extension.

==== Station renovations ====
In early 2012, the 45th Road–Court House Square station was closed for a complete renovation, which included the addition of elevators and a connection to the Court Square–23rd Street station complex. Additionally, several stations along the line, including Vernon Boulevard–Jackson Avenue, Queensboro Plaza, 33rd Street, and 46th Street, are slated to receive elevators as part of the 2020–2024 MTA Capital Program.

As part of the 2015–2019 Capital Program, the MTA would renovate the 52nd, 61st, 69th, 82nd, 103rd and 111th Streets stations, a project that has been delayed for several years. Conditions at these stations were among the worst of all stations in the subway system. Work was supposed to begin in mid-2020 but was delayed due to the COVID-19 pandemic in New York City. The MTA hired Judlau Contracting as the contractor for the project; in March 2023, Judlau leased space near the 82nd Street station for a construction office. As of March 2023, the MTA planned to begin renovating the 61st, 82nd, and 111th Street stations in 2023; the 52nd and 69th Street stations in 2024; and the 103rd Street station in 2025.

== Station listing ==
Station service legend
Stops all times	Stops 24 hours a day
Stops all times except late nights	Stops every day during daytime hours only
Stops late nights and weekends	Stops everyday during overnight hours and weekends during daytime hours only
Stops weekdays during the day	Stops during weekday daytime hours only
Stops rush hours in the peak direction only	Stops during weekday rush hours in the peak direction only
Time period details
Disabled access	Station is compliant with the Americans with Disabilities Act
↑	Station is compliant with the Americans with Disabilities Act in the indicated direction only
↓	Station is compliant with the Americans with Disabilities Act in the indicated direction only
	Elevator access to mezzanine only

Neighborhood (approximate)	Disabled access	Station	Tracks	Services	Opened	Transfers and notes
Queens
Begins as a three track line
Flushing	Disabled access	Flushing–Main Street	all	7 <7>	January 21, 1928	originally Main Street; Q44 Select Bus Service; Q90 bus to LaGuardia Airport (Terminals C and B only); Connection to LIRR at Flushing–Main Street
Willets Point	↑ (Note: Only the Flushing-bound local side platform is wheelchair-accessible. Trains operate on this platform only during New York Mets games and other special events.)	Mets–Willets Point	all	7 <7>	January 21, 1928	Connection to LIRR at Mets–Willets Point formerly Willets Point–Shea Stadium originally Willets Point Boulevard
Corona	connecting tracks to Corona Yard					
Corona		111th Street	local	7	October 13, 1925	
Corona		103rd Street–Corona Plaza	local	7	April 21, 1917	originally Alburtis Avenue; Flushing-bound trains do not stop here because of renovations until early 2026.
Corona	Disabled access	Junction Boulevard	all	7 <7>	April 21, 1917	originally Junction Avenue; Q72 bus to LaGuardia Airport (Terminals C and B only).
Elmhurst		90th Street–Elmhurst Avenue	local	7	April 21, 1917	originally Elmhurst Avenue
Jackson Heights		82nd Street–Jackson Heights	local	7	April 21, 1917	Q33 bus to LaGuardia Airport (Marine Air Terminal only). originally 25th Street–Jackson Heights
Jackson Heights	Disabled access	74th Street–Broadway	local	7 <7>	April 21, 1917	E F <F> M R (IND Queens Boulevard Line at Jackson Heights–Roosevelt Avenue) originally Broadway; Q33 bus to LaGuardia Airport (Marine Air Terminal only); Q53 Select Bus Service; Q70 Select Bus Service to LaGuardia Airport (Terminals C and B only)
Woodside		69th Street	local	7 <7>	April 21, 1917	originally Fisk Avenue; Flushing-bound trains do not stop here because of renovations until 2027.
Woodside	Disabled access	61st Street–Woodside	all	7 <7>	April 21, 1917	originally Woodside; Connection to LIRR at Woodside; Q53 Select Bus Service; Q70 Select Bus Service to LaGuardia Airport (Terminals C and B only); All trains stop at this station by opening their doors on the Manhattan-bound platform.
Woodside		52nd Street	local	7 <7>	April 21, 1917	originally Lincoln Avenue; Flushing-bound trains do not stop here because of renovations until 2027.
Sunnyside		46th Street–Bliss Street	local	7 <7>	April 21, 1917	originally Bliss Street; All Flushing-bound trains stop at this station on the express track by opening their doors on the extended northbound platform.
Sunnyside		40th Street–Lowery Street	local	7 <7>	April 21, 1917	originally Lowery Street; All Flushing-bound trains stop at this station on the express track by opening their doors on the extended northbound platform.
Sunnyside		33rd Street–Rawson Street	local	7 <7>	April 21, 1917	originally Rawson Street; All Flushing-bound trains stop at this station on the express track by opening their doors on the extended northbound platform.
Center Express track ends
connecting tracks to BMT Astoria Line (no passenger service)
Long Island City	Disabled access	Queensboro Plaza	all	7 <7>	November 5, 1916	N W (BMT Astoria Line)
Long Island City	Disabled access	Court Square	all	7 <7>	November 5, 1916	originally 45th Road–Court House Square; G (IND Crosstown Line); E F <F> (IND Queens Boulevard Line)
Long Island City		Hunters Point Avenue	all	7 <7>	February 15, 1916	Connection to LIRR at Hunterspoint Avenue
Long Island City		Vernon Boulevard–Jackson Avenue	all	7 <7>	June 22, 1915	originally Vernon-Jackson Avenues; Connection to LIRR at Long Island City
Manhattan
Steinway Tunnel under the East River
Midtown Manhattan	Disabled access	Grand Central–42nd Street	all	7 <7>	June 22, 1915	4 5 6 <6> (IRT Lexington Avenue Line); S (IRT 42nd Street Shuttle); Connection to Metro-North Railroad at Grand Central Terminal; Connection to Long Island Rail Road at Grand Central Madison
Midtown Manhattan	Elevator access to mezzanine only	Fifth Avenue	all	7 <7>	March 22, 1926	B D F <F> M (IND Sixth Avenue Line at 42nd Street–Bryant Park)
Midtown Manhattan (Times Square)	Disabled access	Times Square–42nd Street	all	7 <7>	March 14, 1927	N Q R W (BMT Broadway Line); 1 2 3 (IRT Broadway–Seventh Avenue Line); A C E (IND Eighth Avenue Line at 42nd Street–Port Authority Bus Terminal); S (IRT 42nd Street Shuttle); Port Authority Bus Terminal
Hell's Kitchen / Hudson Yards / Chelsea	Disabled access	34th Street–Hudson Yards	all	7 <7>	September 13, 2015	built as part of the 7 Subway Extension planning names 34th Street, 34th Street–Javits Center; M34 Select Bus Service
