= Lo-V =

Lo-V or variant may refer to:

- low voltage
- Standard Lo-V (New York City Subway car)
- Flivver Lo-V (New York City Subway car)
- Steinway Lo-V (New York City Subway car)
- World's Fair Lo-V (New York City Subway car)
- low velocity
