= R33 (New York City Subway car) =

Retired class of New York City Subway car

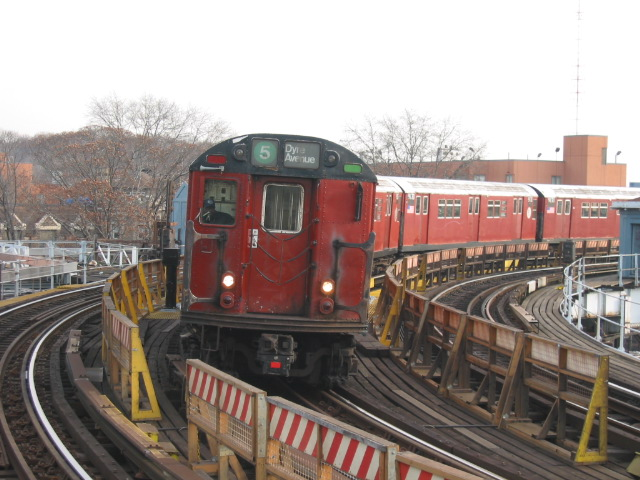
- An R33 train on the 5 at West Farms Square–East Tremont Avenue

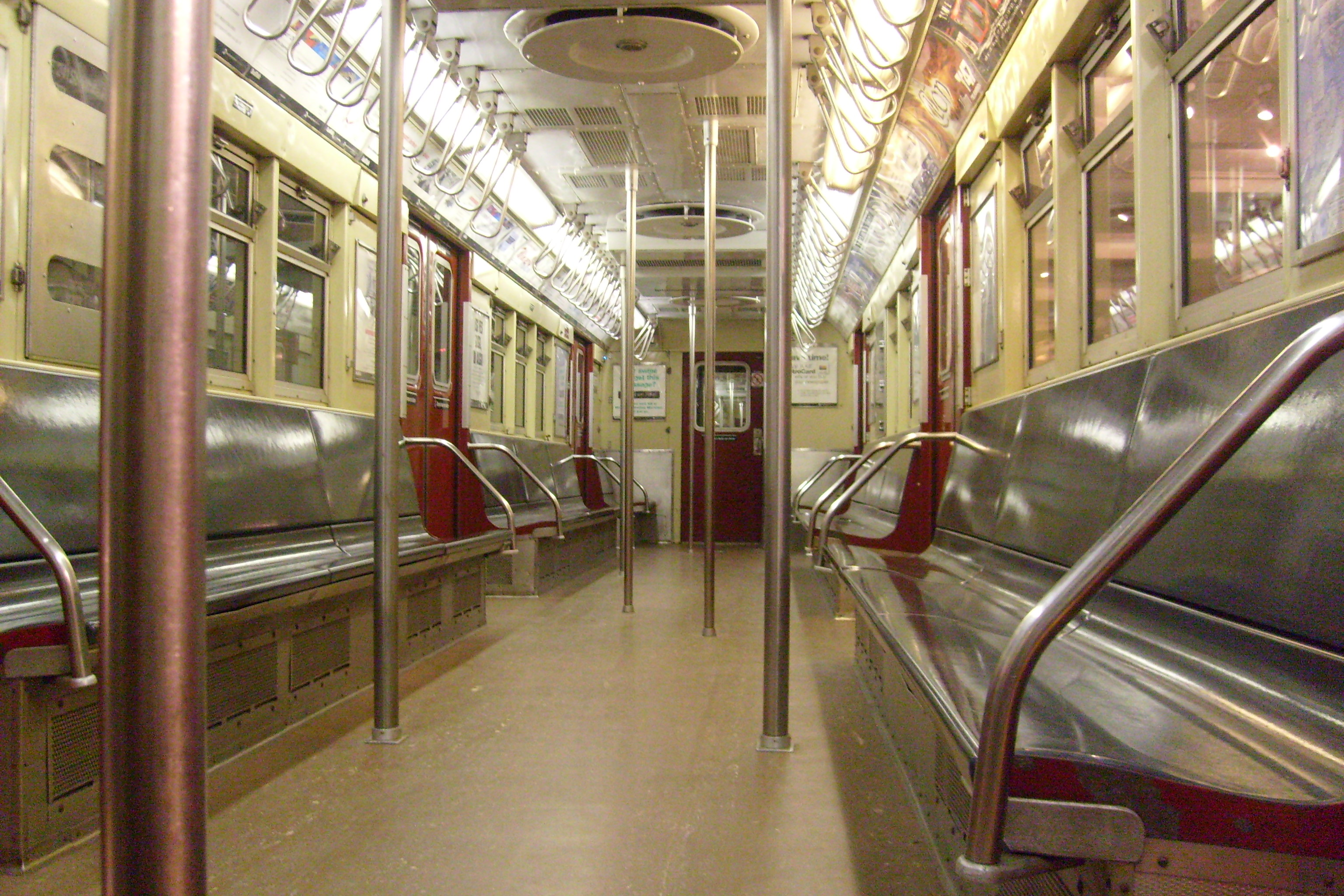
- Interior of an overhauled R33 car
- In service: November 15, 1962 – April 20, 2003 (41 years)
- Manufacturer: St. Louis Car Company
- Built at: St. Louis, Missouri
- Family name: Redbirds
- Replaced: Many Steinway Lo-Vs and Standard Lo-Vs; All Flivver Lo-Vs
- Constructed: 1962–1963
- Entered service: November 15, 1962
- Refurbished: 1986–1991
- Scrapped: 2001–2003 (revenue service cars); 2013 (cars used as refuse motors)
- Number built: 500 cars (250 pairs)
- Number in service: (42 in work service)
- Number preserved: 11
- Number scrapped: 447
- Successor: R142 and R142A
- Formation: Married Pairs
- Fleet numbers: 8806–9305
- Capacity: 45 (seated)
- Operator: New York City Subway

Specifications
- Car body construction: LAHT carbon steel
- Car length: 51.04 feet (15.56 m)
- Width: 8.75 feet (2,667 mm)
- Height: 11.86 feet (3,615 mm)
- Doors: 6 sets of 50 inch wide side doors per car
- Maximum speed: 55 mph (89 km/h)
- Weight: 72,900 lb (33,100 kg) (post-rebuild)
- Traction system: GE 17KG192AE2/3 (9076–9305 formerly Westinghouse)
- Power output: Westinghouse 1447JR/GE 1257E1, 100 hp (74.6 kW) per axle
- Electric systems: 600 V DC third rail
- Current collection: Contact shoe
- Bogies: none
- Braking systems: WABCO, "SMEE" electrodynamic
- Safety system: Emergency brakes
- Track gauge: 4 ft 8 1/2 in (1,435 mm) standard gauge

The R33 was a New York City Subway car model that was built by St. Louis Car Company in 1962 and 1963. The cars are a "follow-up" or supplemental stock for the A Division's R29s and closely resemble them. The cars were also referred to as R33MLs (R33 Main Line) to distinguish them from the R33Ss. A total of 500 cars were built, numbered 8806–9305, and arranged in pairs.

The R33s entered service on November 15, 1962, and were the first A Division fleet to be retrofitted with air conditioning, being retrofitted between 1972 and 1982. The R33 fleet was overhauled between 1986 and 1991. The R33s were replaced in the early 2000s with the delivery of the R142 and R142A cars, with the last train running on April 20, 2003. After being retired, most R33s were sunk into the ocean as artificial reefs, but several cars have survived.

== Description ==
Side route and destination rollsigns of an R33ML

The R33s were numbered 8806–9305. The cars were referred to as R33MLs (R33 Main Line) to distinguish them from the R33Ss.

The R33s are very similar in appearance to the previous R26s, R28s, and R29s, but like the R29s and unlike the R26s and R28s, the R33s were built by the St. Louis Car Company instead of American Car and Foundry, and permanently paired with link bars (instead of couplers).

The R33s wore several paint schemes during their service lives. They were the second subway cars to feature a bright red paint scheme after the R29s. In 1971–1973, the R33s were repainted into the MTA corporate silver and blue scheme. In 1982–1983, they were repainted full white (roof, bonnets, and sides were all painted white) in an attempt to combat graffiti. In 1985, GE cars 8842–8843, 8846–8847, 8848–8849, 8856–8857, 8860–8861, and 8862–8863 were repainted in a Kale Green or Green hornet livery with a dark green body, black front bonnets and anti-climbers, and a silver roof. Finally, between 1986 and 1988, the R33s were repainted into the Redbird paint scheme, with a deep maroon red body, black front bonnets and anti-climbers, and a silver roof.

== History ==
The first set of R33 cars was placed in service on the 1 train on November 15, 1962. Five hundred cars were built and served on all IRT subway lines. In 1972, they became the first A Division cars to be retrofitted with air conditioning when cars 9086/7, 9118/9, 9162/3, 9226/7, 9282/3, & 9294/5 were retrofitted at the 239th Street Yard with a modified version of the Stone Safety Air conditioning unit designed to fit on the smaller IRT cars. By 1982, all R33 cars had received air conditioning. The cars were also rebuilt between 1986 and 1991.

Before they were rebuilt, the R33 cars were grouped as follows:

- Cars #8806–9075 had General Electric electrical equipment
- Cars #9076–9305 had Westinghouse electrical equipment

From 1986 until early 1991, the R33 cars were overhauled and rebuilt by the MTA's 207th Street and Coney Island Overhaul Shops. All cars were refitted with General Electric equipment. Existing General Electric cars received New York Air Brake Newtran brake packages; the former Westinghouse cars received an updated brake package from the Westinghouse Air Brake Company.

After rebuilding, R33 cars served the 2, 4, and 5 trains, and occasionally the 7 train.

=== Retirement ===
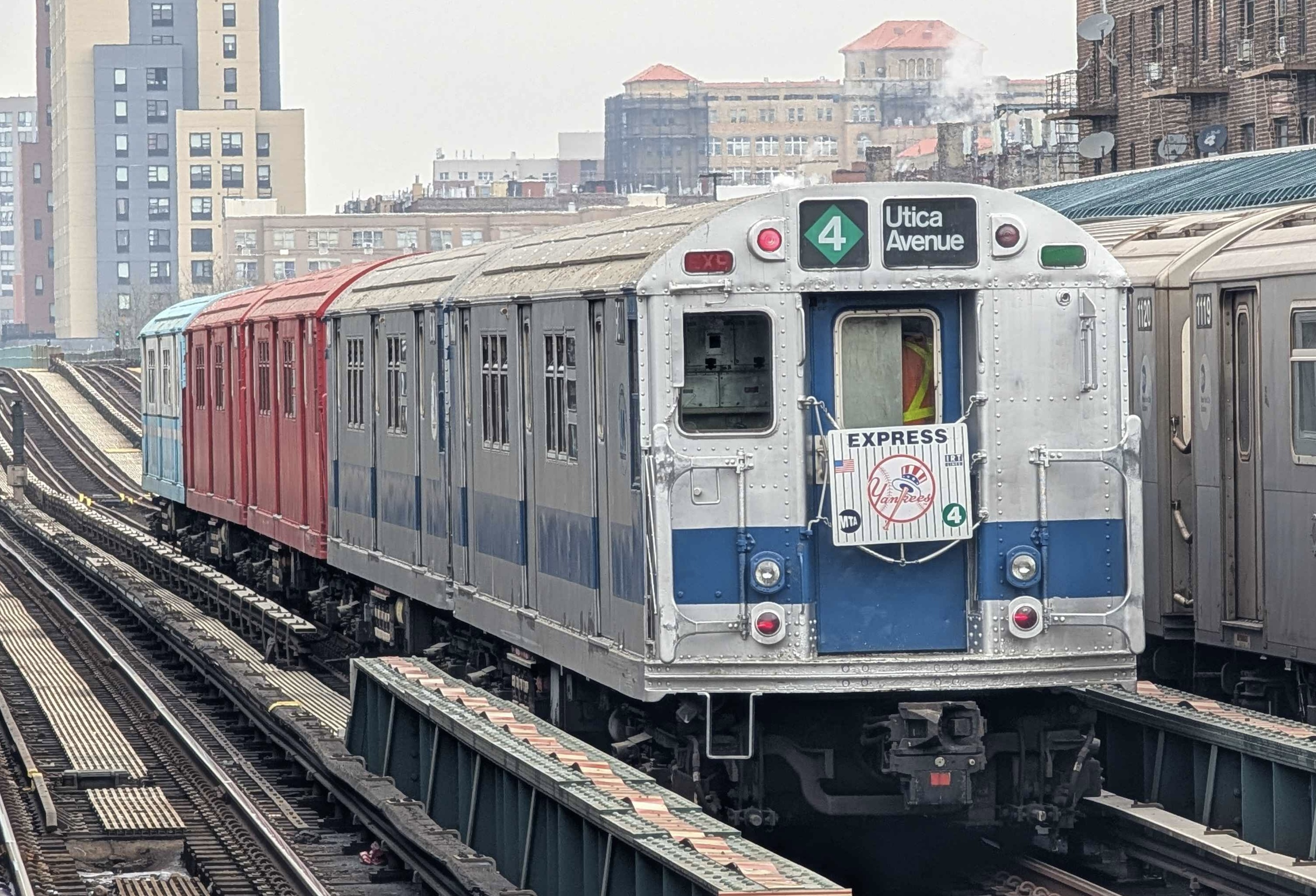
Several R33 cars operating on the Train of Many Colors for the Yankees Home Opener in April 2026

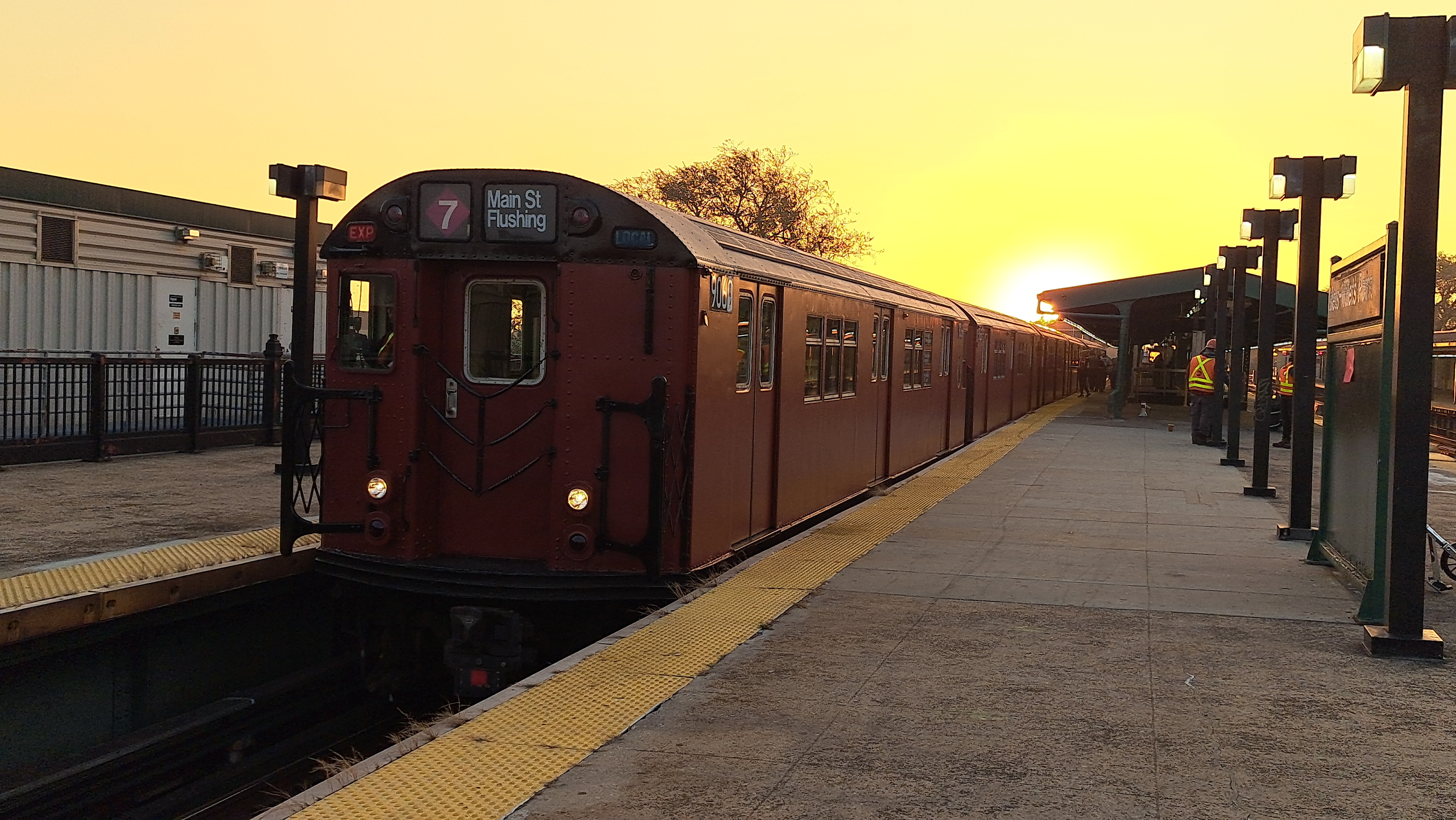
R33 cars 9068-9069 at Mets–Willets Point, after being used for the movie Caught Stealing in 2024

In April 1997, the MTA awarded contracts to Bombardier and Kawasaki for the delivery and purchase of new subway cars (the R142 and R142A) in order to retire the R33s, as well as the other A Division Redbird trains. In June 2001, Delaware agreed to acquire 400 cars being retired amongst the A Division Redbird fleet, including the R33s, to create artificial reefs 16 miles off the coast of the state. The fleet began being withdrawn from service in July, with the first cars being reefed in August. The last ten cars on the active roster (numbered 8842–8843, 9090–9091, 9240–9241, 9294–9295, and 9302–9303) made their last trip on the 4 on April 20, 2003.

Most of the retired cars were stripped and dumped into the Atlantic Ocean to form artificial reefs. 21 pairs were painted yellow and black and converted to work service as R161 rider cars RD400–RD441 from 1999 to 2007, allowing the retirement of the older R71 rider cars. RD407 (ex-8869) was damaged in a derailment and was scrapped in 2013. RD440–RD441 were further converted into de-icer cars.

The R33 cars not converted into rider cars were saved for various purposes throughout the New York City Subway system. The full list includes:

- 8885 – converted into a rail adhesion car for the IRT Dyre Avenue Line after a derailment south of the Franklin Avenue station that led to the retirement of its mate, 8884. The car is hauled by other cars during the fall season.
- 8912–8913 – used as a static display at the Tiffany Street Iron Shops, a training facility for elevated structure workers in Hunts Point, Bronx. This pair was previously involved in a derailment at the 239th Street Yard.
- 9010–9011, 9016–9017, 9068–9069, and 9206–9207 – preserved for the New York Transit Museum. They were repainted into various vintage paint schemes and have been used for various purposes since retirement, mainly on the Train of Many Colors.
- 9156–9157 – used for police training at Floyd Bennett Field until late 2013, when the pair was replaced by R32 GE-rebuilt pair 3594–3595. The cars were moved to Linden Yard, and then up to the 207th Street Yard in 2014 for storage. Plans are unknown for these cars.

Car 9075 was previously displayed outside Queens Borough Hall in Kew Gardens, Queens. The car was retrofitted with swinging doors and converted to a tourist center, but was closed in 2015 due to low patronage. Afterwards, the car was used as a landmark and for movie shoots until it was put up for auction in June 2022. The car was finally trucked out of New York City on October 16, 2022.

Other cars were retained for work service until 2013, when they were scrapped. The full list includes:

- Pairs 8812–8813, 8834–8835, 8996–8997, and 9000–9001 – used to haul refuse trains until being scrapped in 2013. It was based from the 38th Street Yard, and was replaced with R32s restricted to work service.
- Pair 8888–8889 – used to haul refuse trains until being scrapped in 2013. It was based from the Westchester Yard, but in 2011 was mothballed when Westchester Yard stopped using subway cars for work service.
