= Redbird Reef =

Artificial reef located in the Atlantic Ocean

Coordinates: 38.589°N 74.112°W

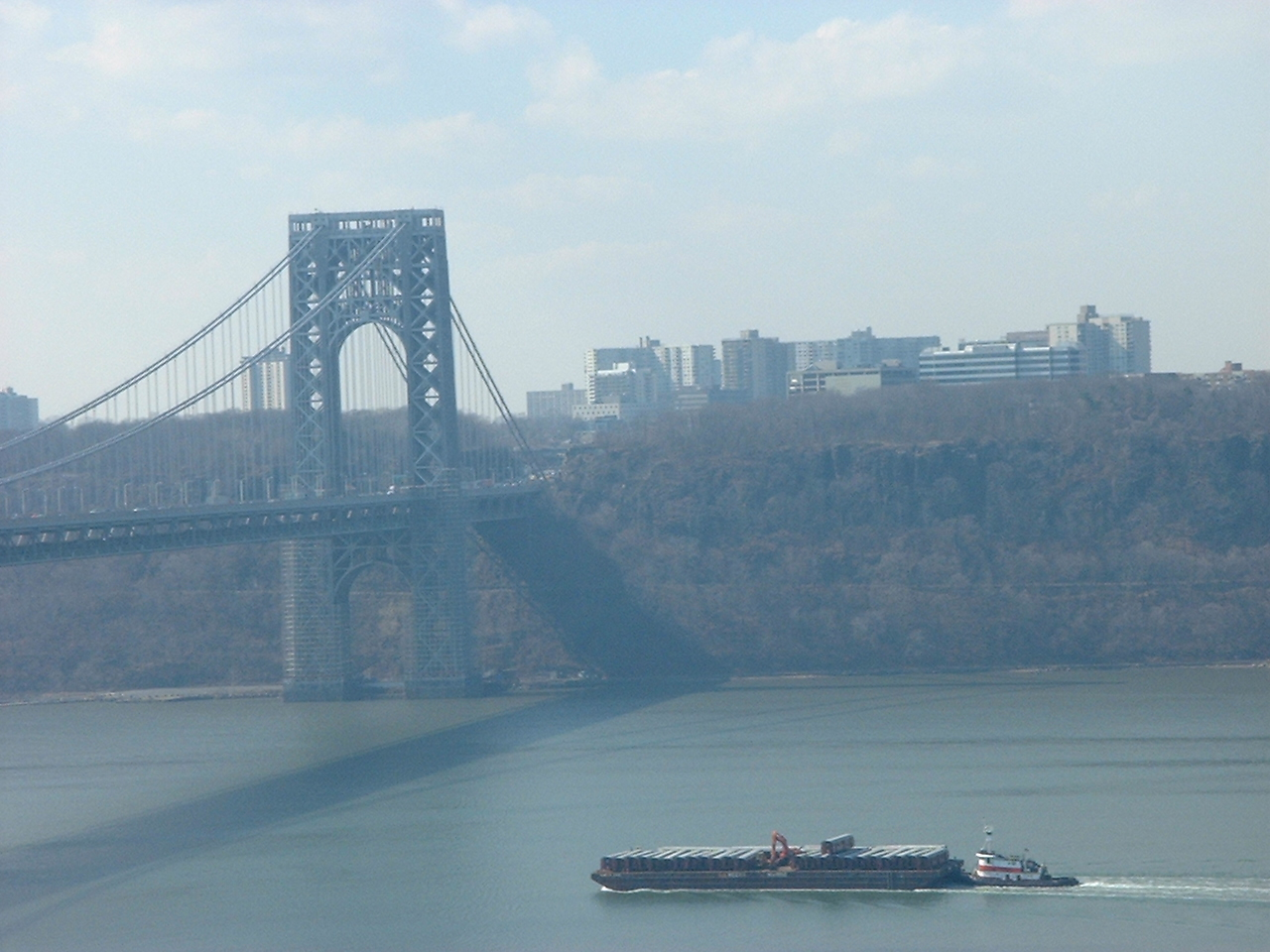
- Retired Redbird subway cars pass under the George Washington Bridge on the way to being sunk.
- Type of project: Artificial reef
- Location: near the coast of Slaughter Beach, Delaware

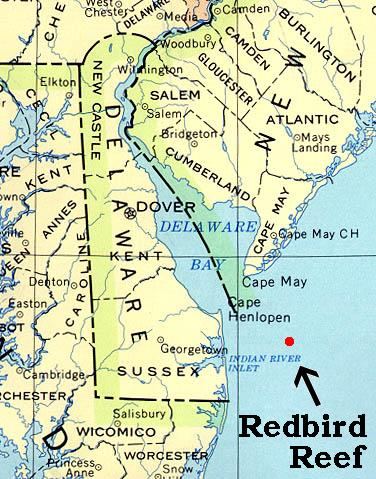
Location of Redbird Reef

Redbird Reef is an artificial reef located in the Atlantic Ocean, off the coast of Slaughter Beach, Delaware, 16 miles (25.7 km) east of the Indian River Inlet.

Established by the Maryland Reef Initiative in 2001, this reef covers 1.3 square nautical miles of ocean floor and is located 80 feet (24.4 m) below the surface.

The reef comprises 714 Redbird (R26–R36 series) New York City Subway cars dumped by Weeks Marine, 86 retired tanks and armored personnel carriers, eight tugboats and barges, and 3,000 tons of ballasted truck tires.

From 2001 to 2008, within the vicinity of the reef, the amount of marine food per square foot has increased 400 times.

The site is the most visited reef site off Delaware's coast, receiving more than 10,000 fishing parties annually, and is home to numerous marine species, including black sea bass, flounder, blue mussels, sponges, barnacles, and coral. Also, tuna and mackerel hunt at the reef. The site has become so popular that fishermen steal from each other, and other states apply for the next subway cars to be dumped in their waters.

== Similar reefs ==
The Redbirds were not the only trains that were reefed. In December 2007, an agreement was made with the Delaware Department of Natural Resources and Environmental Control to reef the trains (R32s, R38s, R40/As, R42s) that would be retired by the R160s, as well as work trains (R71s (converted R14s, R15s, R17s, R21s, R22s) that were retired around the same time by converted Redbirds into work trains.

Other trains to be reefed included a number of R16s, R30s, and R62s.

== See also ==
- Marine biology
- Osborne Reef
