= R142A (New York City Subway car) =

Class of New York City Subway car

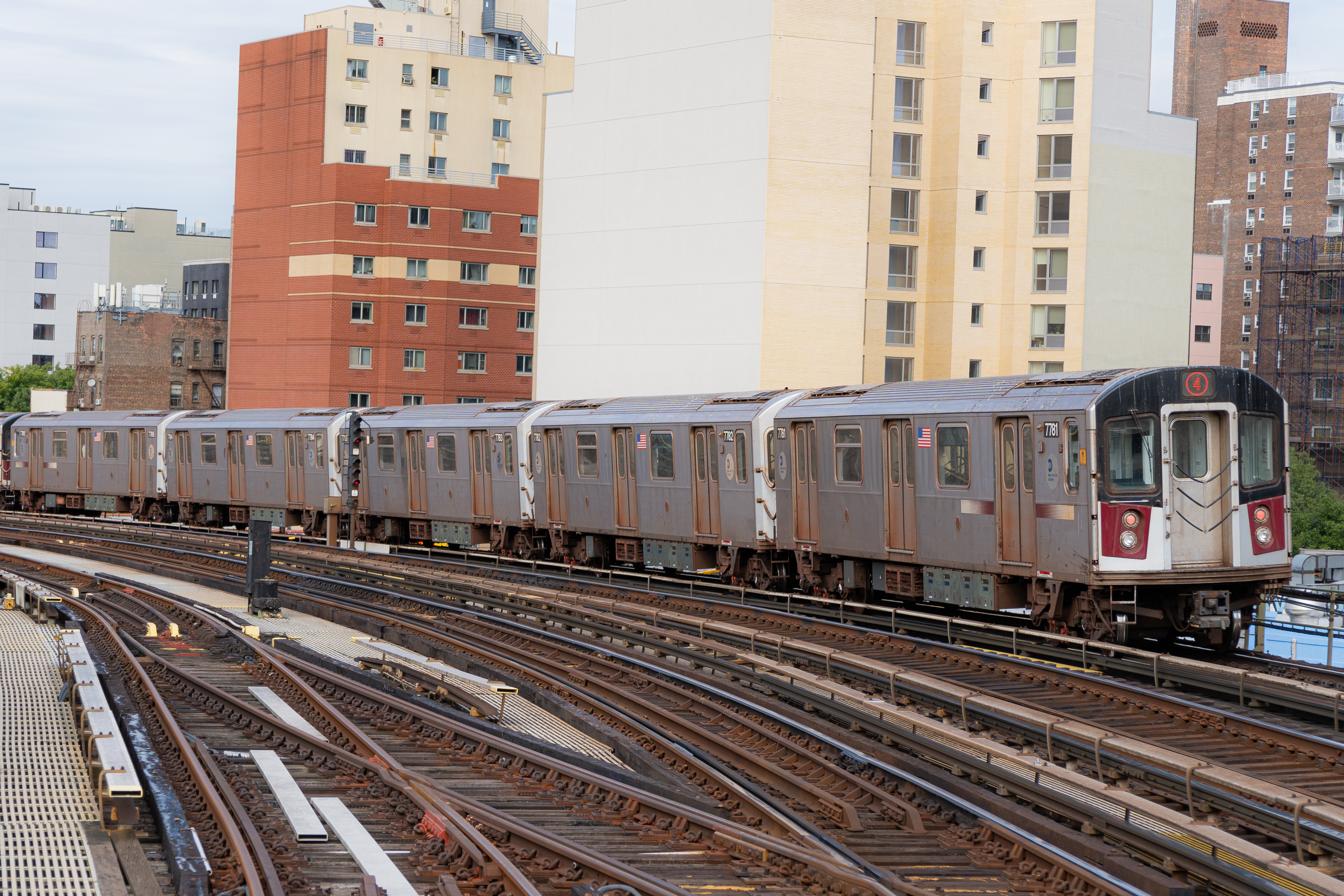
- An R142A train on the 4 route leaving Bedford Park Boulevard–Lehman College

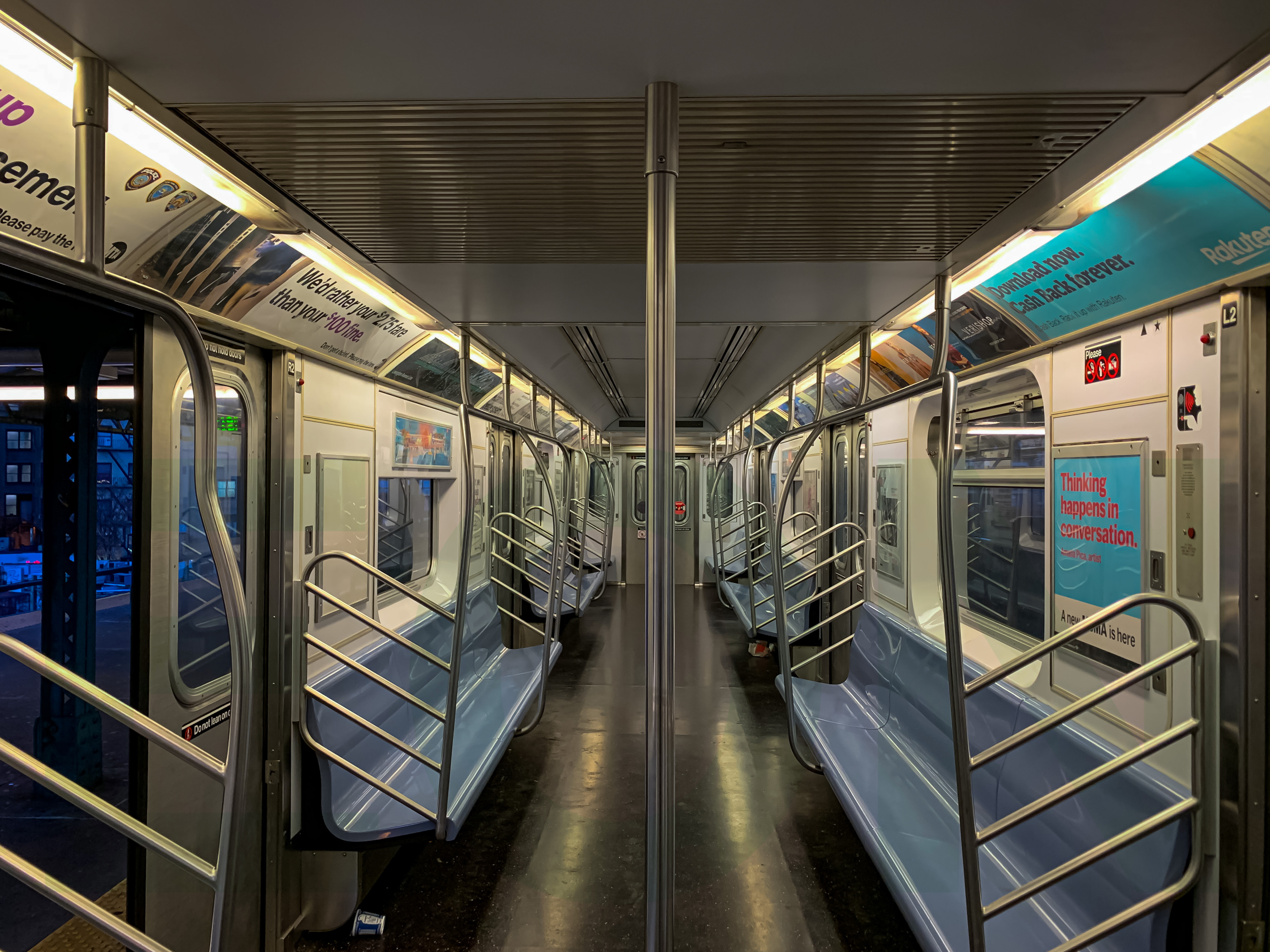
- Interior of an R142A car
- In service: July 10, 2000 – present (26 years)
- Manufacturer: Kawasaki Rail Car Company
- Built at: Kobe, Hyōgo, Japan + Lincoln, Nebraska, US (final assembly: Yonkers, New York, US)
- Family name: NTT (new technology train)
- Replaced: All Redbirds (R26–R36)
- Constructed: 1999–2005
- Entered service: July 10, 2000 (revenue service testing); November 2, 2000 (official service)
- Refurbished: R188s: 2010–2016 (cars 7211–7590 only)
- Number built: 600
- Number in service: 220 (380 in revenue service as R188s)
- Successor: R262
- Formation: 5-car sets (2 A cars and 3 B cars)
- Fleet numbers: 7211–7810 (as built); 7591–7810 (currently, after R188 conversion)
- Capacity: 176 (A car); 188 (B car)
- Operator: New York City Subway
- Depot: Jerome Yard
- Services assigned: (Updated June 30, 2024)

Specifications
- Car body construction: Stainless steel with fiberglass end bonnets
- Train length: 513 ft 4 in (156.46 m) (10 car train); 256 ft 8 in (78.23 m) (5 car set)
- Car length: 51 ft 4 in (15.65 m)
- Width: 8 ft 7 3/16 in (2,621 mm)
- Height: 11 ft 10 5/8 in (3,623 mm)
- Floor height: 3 ft 7 3/4 in (1.11 m)
- Platform height: 3 ft 7 3/4 in (1.11 m)
- Entry: Level
- Doors: 6 sets of 54 inch wide side doors per car
- Maximum speed: 66 mph (110 km/h) (design); 55 mph (89 km/h) (service)
- Weight: 73,300 lb (33,200 kg) (A car); 67,800 lb (30,800 kg) (B car)
- Traction system: Adtranz/Bombardier PWM 2-level IGBT–VVVF
- Traction motors: 2 or 4 (Note: 4 on A cars, 2 on B cars) × Adtranz/Bombardier 1508C 150 hp (111.855 kW) 3-phase AC induction motor
- Power output: 2,100 hp (1,565.970 kW) (5-car set)
- Acceleration: 2.5 mph/s (4.0 km/(h⋅s))
- Deceleration: 3.0 mph/s (4.8 km/(h⋅s)) (full service); 3.2 mph/s or 5.1 km/(h⋅s) (emergency)
- Auxiliaries: SAFT 195 AH battery (B car)
- Electric systems: Third rail, 625 V DC
- Current collection: Contact shoe
- Braking systems: Dynamic/Regenerative braking propulsion system; WABCO RT-96 tread brake system
- Safety systems: Dead man's switch, Train stop
- Headlight type: Halogen light bulb
- Track gauge: 4 ft 8 1/2 in (1,435 mm) standard gauge

The R142A is the second order of new technology cars (NTTs) for the A Division of the New York City Subway. These cars were built by Kawasaki Heavy Industries in Kobe, Hyōgo, Japan, and Lincoln, Nebraska, U.S. with final assembly performed at Yonkers, New York. Together with the R142s, they replaced the Redbird trains, including the R26, R28, R29, R33, R33S, and R36. The R142A fleet initially comprised 600 cars, arranged as five-car units.

The first R142As were delivered on December 20, 1999. The cars initially experienced minor issues while undergoing testing, but entered service on July 10, 2000, as part of its 30-day revenue acceptance test. After successful completion, the cars entered revenue service by November 2, 2000. The fleet initially ran on the 4 and 6 services of the IRT Lexington Avenue Line.

In 2010–2016, 380 cars (7211–7590) were retrofitted with communications-based train control (CBTC) for the automation of the Flushing Line and became part of the R188 fleet, leaving 220 cars (7591–7810) in the R142A fleet. In January 2019, the MTA proposed mid-life upgrades to the remainder of the R142As; however, as of 2026, the MTA expects to replace the R142As with the upcoming R262s.

== Description ==
The R142As are numbered 7591–7810. They were originally numbered 7211–7810 when built, but cars 7211–7590 were converted into R188s.

The R142A contract was divided into three sub-orders: 400 main order cars (7211–7610), 120 option order cars (7611–7730), and 80 cars built under a supplemental contract (R142S) in 2004–2005 to supplement the R142As (7731–7810). Regardless of sub-order differences, all R142As are mechanically and physically identical to each other.

Currently, all R142As are assigned to the Jerome Yard and run on the 4.

== Features ==
The R142As feature ADtranz (later Bombardier) propulsion systems, electronic braking, automatic climate control, electronic strip maps, interior and exterior electronic displays, and an on-board intercom system. The traction systems that are present on the R142As were later used for the R143 and R188 fleets; the same traction systems would also be used for the Type 8 light rail vehicles on the Green Line of the MBTA and the CQ31x rail fleet of the MARTA rail system. The R142 and the R142A were partly designed by Antenna Design.

The R142As are divided up into five-car sets, in the A-B-B-B-A configuration, with the two A cars (cab cars) on the ends, and three B cars (non-cab cars) in the middle. Trains consist of two five-car sets coupled together, making up a ten-car train. Like all other A-Division cars, each car has three sets of doors per side. Like the R110As, the R142As feature wider doors than past A-Division equipment, with 54-inch side doors (about 9 inches narrower than the R110As' 63-inch doors, but 4 inches wider than the R62/As' 50-inch doors). All car ends have windows, allowing passengers to see through to the next car, except cab ends, where the cab walls prevent such visibility. The R142A car bodies are constructed from stainless steel.

The R142As and R142s are the first New York City Subway cars to feature recorded announcements. All passenger cars built after them also use this feature. The R142As are visually very similar to the R142s and R188s, but due to electrical incompatibilities, the three types are not interoperable; only converted R142As that feature CBTC can interoperate with the R188s.

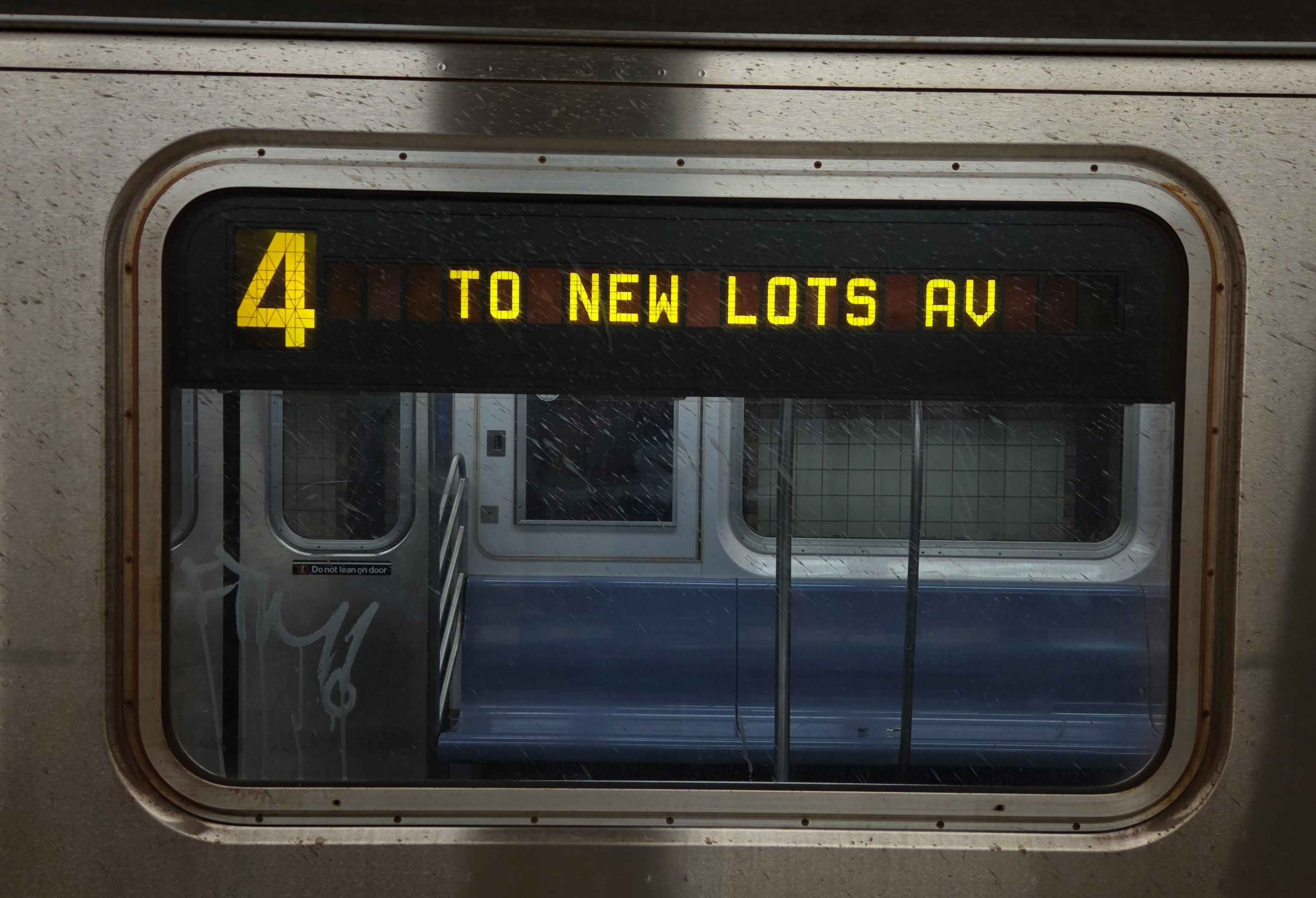
The LCD sign of an R142A car

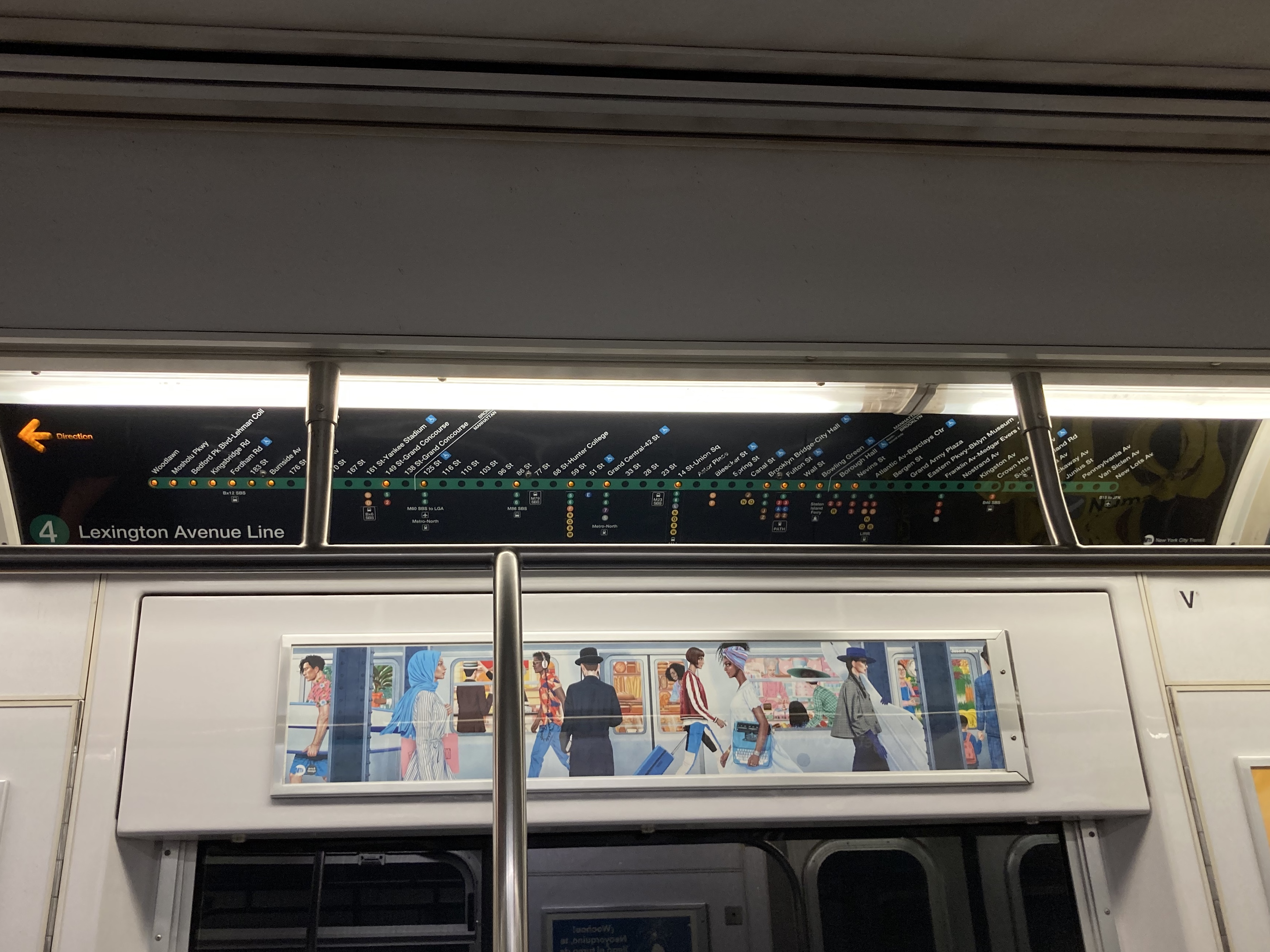
The electronic strip map in an R142A car

=== Experimental features ===
From late 2017 to late 2018, the interiors of the electronic sign boxes on cars 7691–7692 were retrofitted with LCD screens, replacing the MTA Arts for Transit cards usually located there. Several R160s were previously retrofitted with this feature. The screens were similar to the interior LED screens on the R143s, except that the R142As' screens had the capabilities to display multiple colors instead of only red, orange, and green.

== History ==
=== Delivery ===
The first ten R142As, 7211–7220, were delivered on December 20, 1999. The cars were placed into service on the 6 on July 10, 2000, as part of its 30-day revenue acceptance test, after several months of non-revenue service testing and the resolving of all issues. After successful completion, it entered revenue service on November 2, 2000. The R142A fleet originally only ran on the 6; the first R142As assigned to the 4 started running on July 25, 2002.

During delivery, there were minor issues reported with the R142s and the R142As.

By October 29, 2002, all R142As would have entered passenger service.

In mid-2003, the MTA purchased a supplemental order of 80 additional R142As (7731–7810) for service increases, these subway cars (7731-7810) 80 additional R142As were designated as “R142S”. These cars were constructed and delivered in 2004–2005, and by June 2005, all were entered in service.

=== Post-delivery ===
The total of 380 cars – 7211–7590 – have been retrofitted with CBTC for the Flushing Line CBTC service and were converted to R188s. The first R142As (7211–7220) were sent out to the Kawasaki Rail Car plant in Yonkers in 2011 for conversion to R188s. The last R142As (7581–7590) to be sent to the Kawasaki Rail Car plant were removed from service on March 18, 2016, and by the next month had also been sent to the plant.

The remaining 220 cars – 7591–7810 – are still part of the R142A fleet and have been retrofitted with CBTC hardware in the future. To prepare for the arrival of the R62As for use on the 6, 65 of the cars (7591–7595 & 7611–7670) were transferred from the 6 to the 4 in November 2017, and the last 15 of the cars (7596–7610) were transferred from the 6 to the 4 on May 22, 2018.

In January 2019, the MTA proposed mid-life upgrades to several train subsystems in the R142 and R142A fleets. These included changes to the HVAC, propulsion, and door systems, based on installations of these systems in the R188 fleet. Upgrades also included the conversion of the remaining R142A fleet to be compatible with communications-based train control, in conjunction with subway signal upgrades along the IRT Lexington Avenue Line and IRT Broadway–Seventh Avenue Line.

=== Replacement ===
In early 2026, the MTA announced it would be placing the order of 1,140 new R262 train cars to replace the current R62 and R62A fleet, with the option of 1,250 additional cars which if ordered, would replace the entire R142 fleet and the unconverted R142A cars by the early-to-mid 2030s.
