= R28 (New York City Subway car) =

Retired class of New York City Subway car

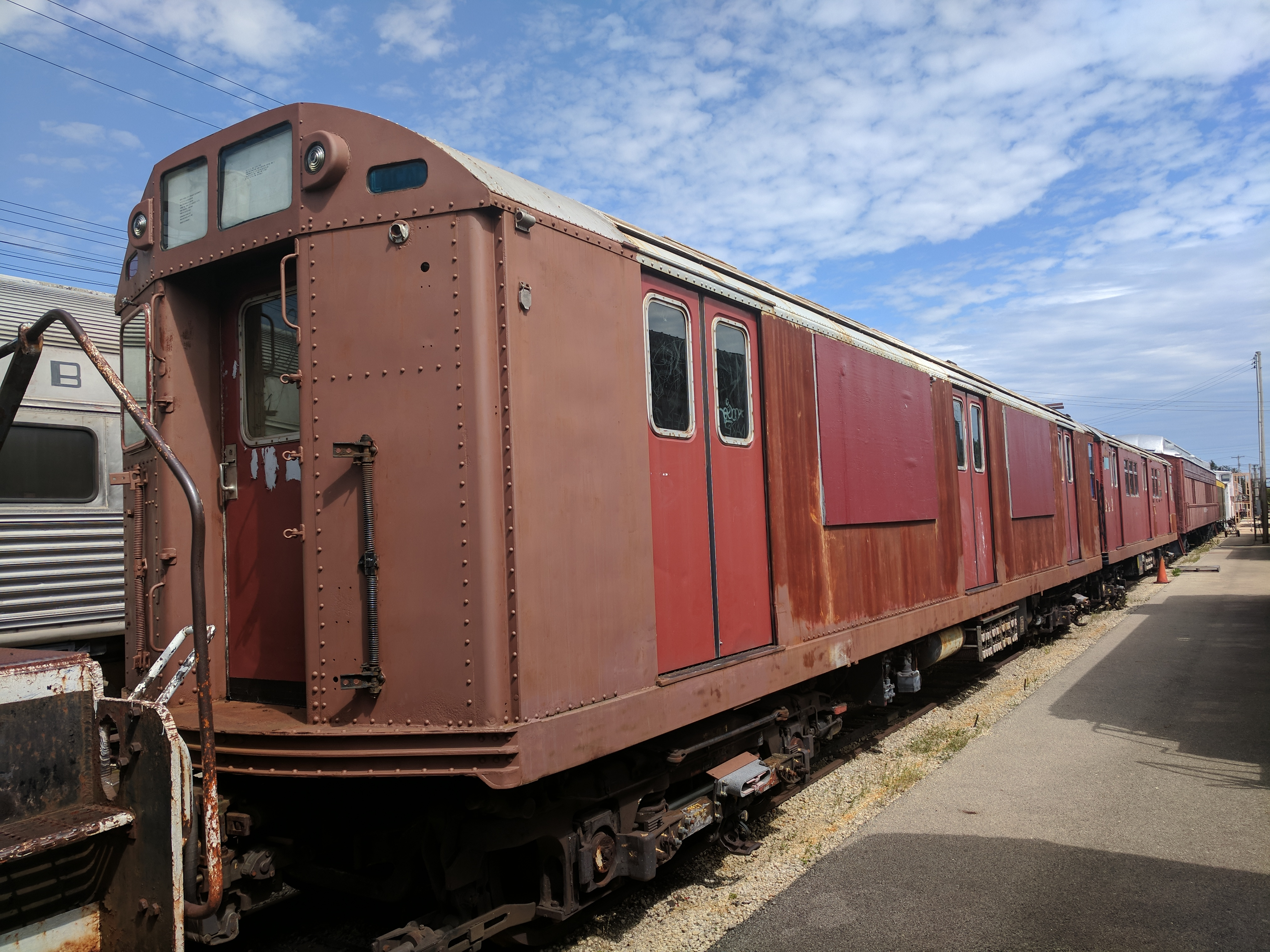
- R28s 7926 and 7927 on display at the Illinois Railway Museum
- In service: 1960 – October 7, 2002 (42 years)
- Manufacturer: American Car and Foundry
- Family name: Redbirds
- Replaced: Many Steinway Lo-Vs; All Flivver Lo-Vs; Many Standard Lo-Vs
- Constructed: 1960–1961
- Refurbished: 1985–1987 (General Overhaul program); 1991 (SMS program (H2C coupler to link bar replacement at B ends)
- Scrapped: 2001–2003
- Number built: 100
- Number preserved: 4
- Number scrapped: 96
- Successor: R142 and R142A
- Formation: Semi-Married Pairs
- Fleet numbers: 7860–7959
- Capacity: 44 (seated)
- Operator: New York City Subway

Specifications
- Car body construction: LAHT carbon steel
- Car length: 51.04 feet (15.56 m)
- Width: 8.75 feet (2,667 mm)
- Height: 11.86 feet (3,615 mm)
- Doors: 6 sets of 50 inch wide side doors per car
- Maximum speed: 55 mph (89 km/h)
- Weight: 70,000 lb (32,000 kg) (post-rebuild)
- Traction system: General Electric 17KG192 (7860–7909 formerly Westinghouse)
- Traction motors: Westinghouse (WH) 1447J/JR, General Electric (GE) 1257F1
- Power output: 115 hp (85.8 kW)
- Electric system: 600 V DC Third rail
- Current collection: Contact shoe
- Braking systems: WABCO, "SMEE" (electrodynamic)
- Coupling system: Westinghouse H2C
- Track gauge: 4 ft 8 1/2 in (1,435 mm) standard gauge

The R28 was a New York City Subway car model built by American Car and Foundry (ACF) from 1960 to 1961. The cars were a "follow-up" or supplemental stock for the A Division's R26s and closely resemble them. The average car cost per R28 was $114,495. A total of 100 cars were built, arranged in married pairs.

The R28s entered service in late-1960 and received air conditioning by 1982. The fleet was rebuilt by Morrison–Knudsen between 1985 and 1987. The R28s were replaced in 2001 and 2002 with the delivery of the R142 and R142A cars with the last train running on October 7, 2002. After being retired, most R28s were sunk into the ocean as artificial reefs, but four cars have survived.

== Description ==
The R28s were numbered 7860–7959. They were the second order of cars not to be built with operating cabs at both ends after the R26s. They were also the last passenger cars built by ACF, with the closure of the Berwick assembly plant following the delivery of the final cars delivered in January 1961. ACF has since focused solely on freight rolling stock.

Like the R26s, the even-numbered car carried the motor generator and battery set for electrical equipment, while the odd-numbered car held air compressor for the brakes. A special version of the H2C coupler was used to link the cars, so they could easily be split if needed, and thus, they were called "semi-permanent pairs". The No.1 ends of the cars have operator controls, but the No.2 ends only have conductor controls. Although referred to as the "blind end", these ends did have windows for the conductor.

The R28s wore several paint schemes during their service lives. The cars were delivered in a dark olive green paint scheme similar to the R21s, R22s, and R26s. In 1970–1975, the R28s were repainted into the MTA corporate silver and blue scheme. In 1982–1983, the R28s were repainted full white (roof, bonnets, and sides were all painted white) in an attempt to combat graffiti. During rebuilding by Morrison–Knudsen at Hornell, New York, from 1985 to 1987, the R28s were repainted into Redbirds with a deep maroon red body, black front bonnets and anti-climbers, and a silver roof.

== History ==
=== Early history ===
The first set of R28s was delivered in mid-1960 and placed into service on the 6 train in late-1960. By January 1961, all cars have been delivered. Since delivered, the R28s have been assigned exclusively to the 6 until February 16, 1966, when all of the GE cars were moved to the 2, 4, and 5.

=== Late 1970s–Late 1980s ===
The R28s were removed from the 4 in October 1976, and the GE cars were assigned to the 2 and 5. The Westinghouse R28s were assigned exclusively to the 6, except from June 23, 1980, to August 1981, when cars 7861 (mated to R26 7858, 7870–7871, and 7880–7881) were assigned to the 7.

In January 1983, the R28s were removed from the 5, and the GE cars were assigned exclusively to the 2. In May 1983, Westinghouse R28s 7870–7871 and 7880–7881 were returned to the 7 to fill in for the R33Ss and World's Fair R36s while they were being rebuilt. In January 1985, GE cars 7913 and 7928 were assigned to the 42nd Street Shuttle until March 24, 1986, when those cars were moved to the 5. Those cars returned to the 2 on May 4, 1986, right before those cars were rebuilt.

=== Rebuilding ===
By 1982, all cars in this series had received air conditioning as part of a retrofitting program to replace the cars' original Axiflow ceiling fans.

Rebuilt by Morrison–Knudsen in Hornell, New York between 1985 and 1987, the R28s were repainted as Redbirds and were the first cars to be repainted in the scheme. All Westinghouse cars were refitted with GE equipment.

Before they were rebuilt, the R28 cars were grouped as follows:

- Cars 7860–7909 had Westinghouse electrical equipment
- Cars 7910–7959 had General Electric electrical equipment

Beginning in September 1985, the first un-rebuilt GE R28s were removed from service to be sent out for rebuilding. By the end of July 1986, the last un-rebuilt GE R28s were removed from the 2 service. The first Westinghouse cars were sent to be rebuilt in March 1986, and by March 7, 1987, the last R28s were removed from service on the 6 to be sent out for rebuilding. The first rebuilt R28s entered service on the 2 in February 1986. By October 22, 1987, all rebuilt cars were in service.

After rebuilding, all R28s were assigned exclusively to the 2 until May 1995, when all cars were moved to the 5 to improve fleet reliability.

The R28s retained their original H2C couplers on both ends until 1991, when the new Scheduled Maintenance System (SMS) program began. During this time, the R28s were mated numerically and the original H2C couplers on the ends with conductor's controls were replaced with link bars. Prior to 1991, the R28s were often not numerically paired and could also be paired to R26s.

=== Retirement ===
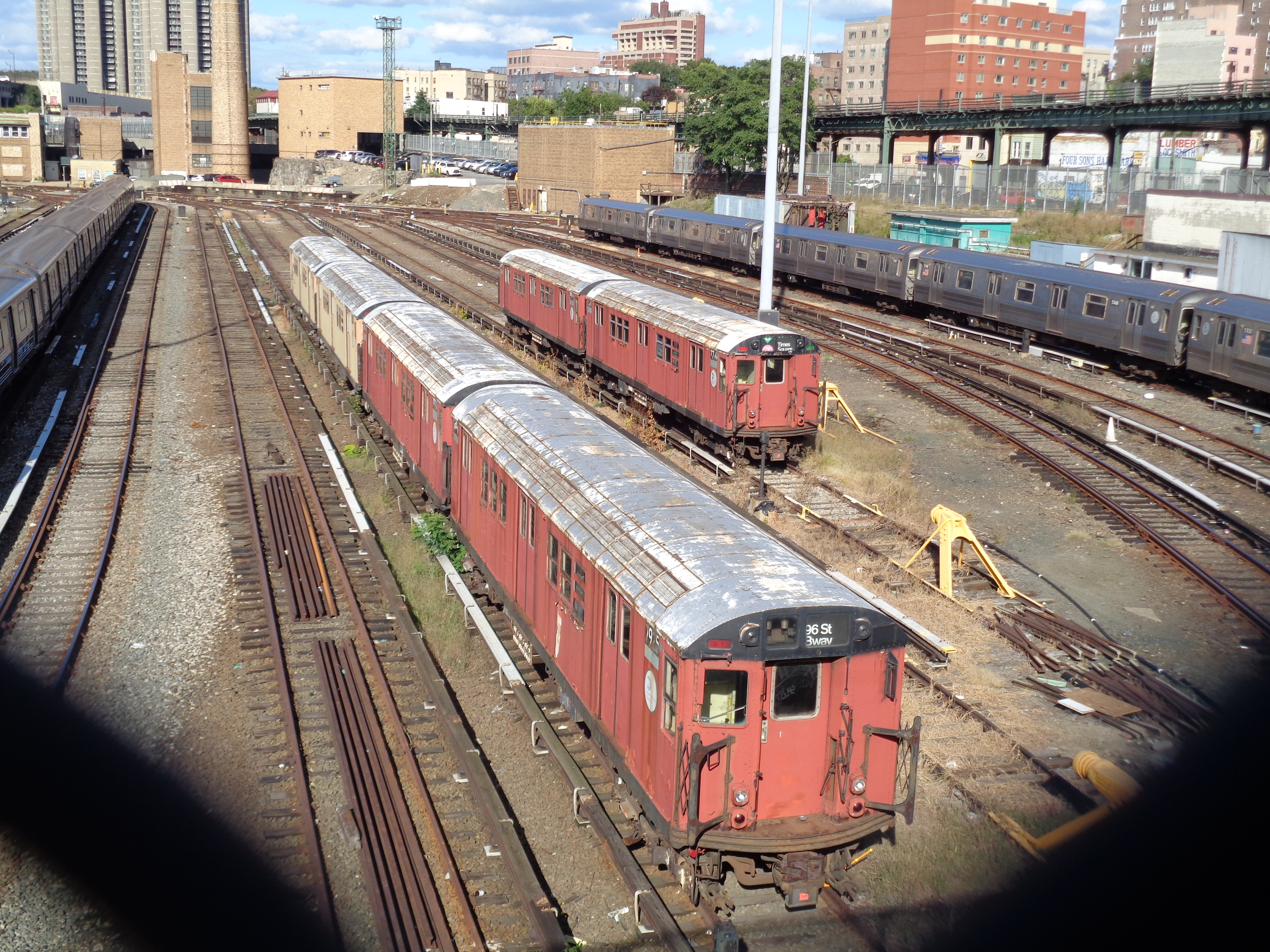
R28 cars 7924–7925 stored at Concourse Yard

In April 1997, the MTA awarded contracts to Bombardier and Kawasaki for the delivery and purchase of new subway cars (the R142 and R142A) in order to retire the R28s, as well as the other A Division Redbird trains. In June 2001, Delaware agreed to acquire 400 cars being retired amongst the A Division Redbird fleet, including the R28s, to create artificial reefs 16 miles off the coast of the state. The fleet began being withdrawn from service in July, with the first cars being reefed in August. The last four cars in the active roster (numbered 7862–7863 and 7938–7939) made their last trip on the 5 on October 7, 2002, along with the R26 fleet.

After retirement, all but two pairs were stripped to help create the Redbird Reef. The two pairs that were not scrapped are preserved:

- Cars 7924–7925 are still on the New York City Subway property; this pair was previously used for work service at the Unionport Yard until July 2013, when they were moved to the Concourse Yard for storage, along with R26s 7774–7775 and R29s 8678–8679.
- Cars 7926–7927 are preserved by the Illinois Railway Museum. They were modified with trolley poles and are currently inoperable in poor condition.
