= Standard Lo-V (New York City Subway car) =

Retired class of New York City Subway car

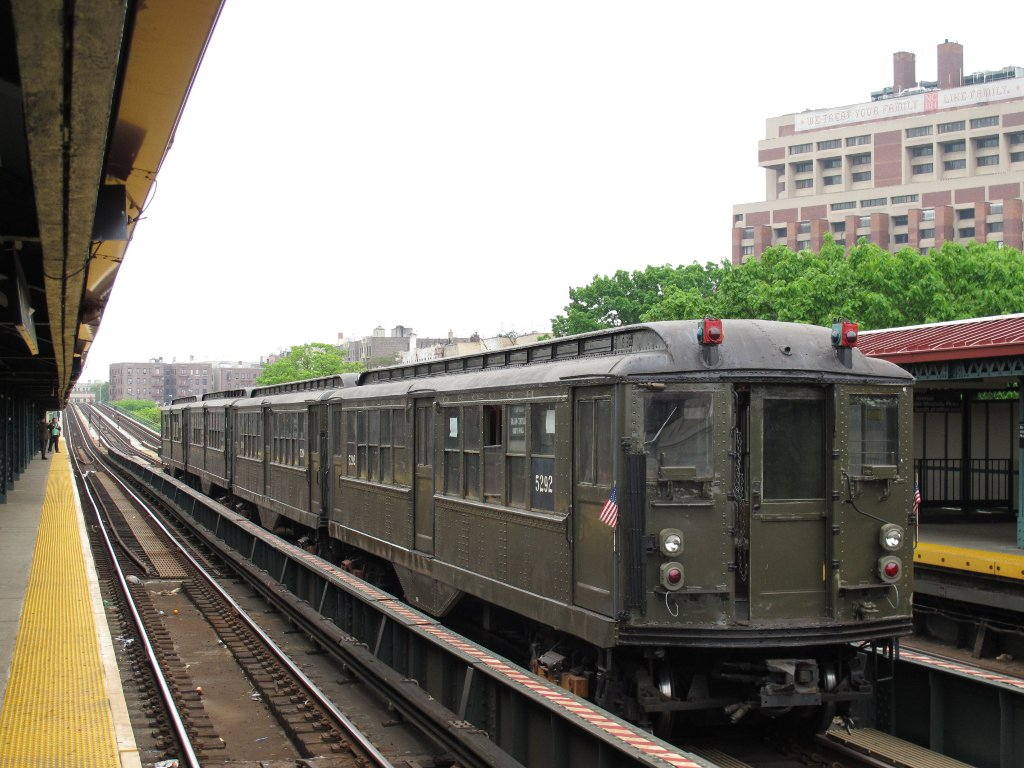
- The four surviving "Low-Voltage" motor cars on layover on the IRT Jerome Avenue Line.

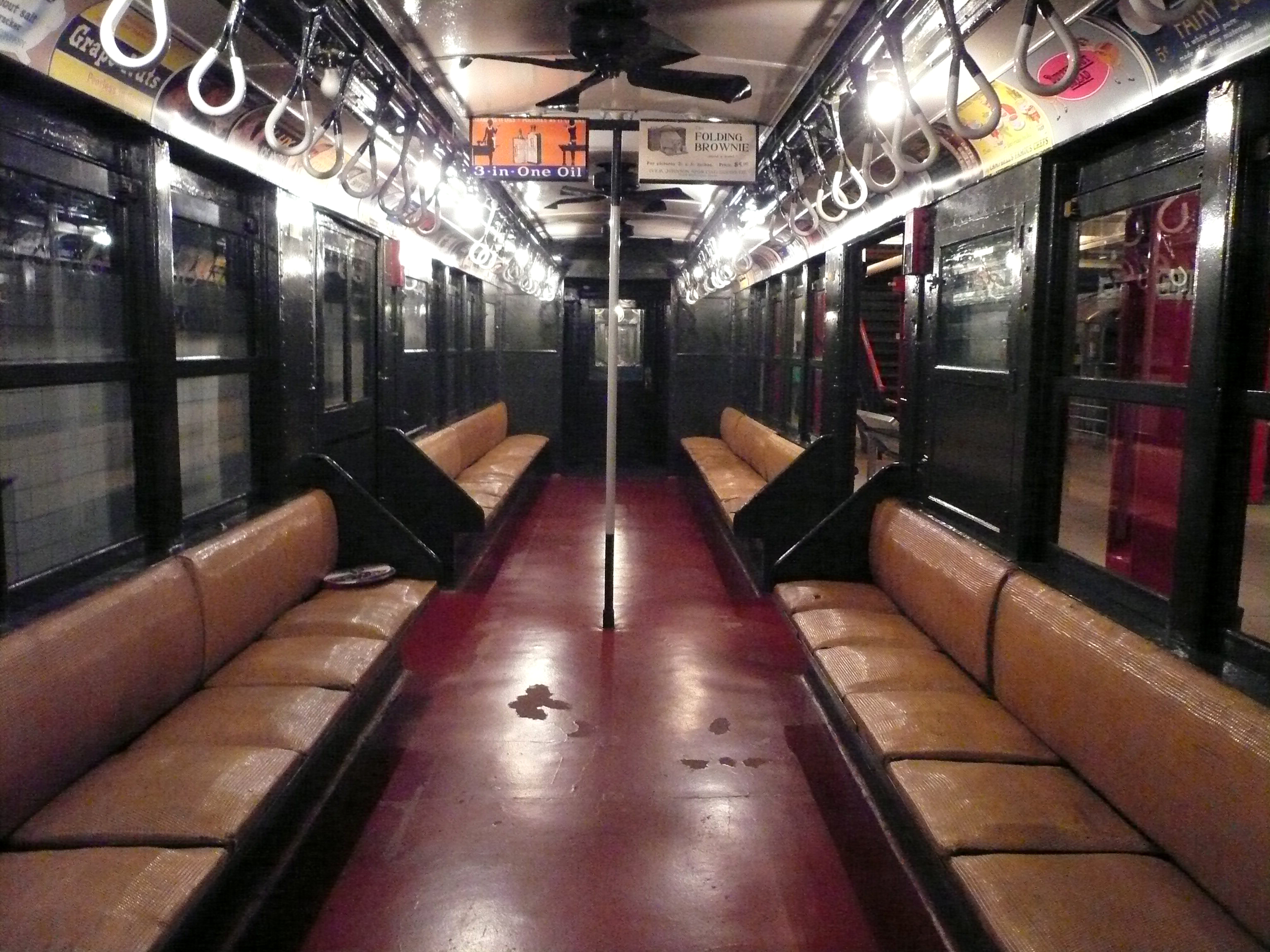
- Interior of a 1917 IRT Lo-V car.
- Manufacturers: Pressed Steel Car Company, American Car and Foundry, Pullman Company
- Replaced: 1969
- Constructed: 1916–1925
- Number built: 1,020 cars (725 motors, 295 trailers)
- Number preserved: 7
- Number scrapped: 1,013
- Successor: R26; R28; R29; R33; R36
- Fleet numbers: 4515–4554 (trailers); 4577–4699 (motors); 4719 (motor); 4772–4810 (motors); 4811–4965 (trailers); 4966–5302 (motors); 5303–5402 (trailers), 5403–5627 (motors)
- Capacity: 196: 44 (seated) 152 (standing)
- Operators: Interborough Rapid Transit Company; NYC Board of Transportation; New York City Transit Authority

Specifications
- Car body construction: Steel
- Car length: 51 ft 6 in (15.70 m)
- Width: 8 ft 10 in (2,692 mm)
- Height: 11 ft 10.5 in (3.62 m)
- Floor height: 3 ft 2 1/8 in (0.97 m)
- Doors: 6
- Maximum speed: 60 mph (97 km/h)
- Weight: Motor car: 77,700 lb (35,200 kg); Trailer car: 56,000 lb (25,000 kg)
- Traction system: Motor car: Westinghouse 577, General Electric 260; Trailer car: None; Air Compressor: WABCO 2-C-Y
- Prime mover: electric motor
- Power output: 200 hp (149 kW) (Wh 577) 195 hp (145 kW) (GE 260) per traction motor
- Electric system: 600 V DC Third rail
- Current collection: Top running Contact shoe
- Braking systems: WABCO Schedule AMUE with UE-5 universal valve, ME-23 brake stand, and simplex clasp brake rigging
- Coupling system: WABCO J
- Headlight type: incandescent light bulbs
- Track gauge: 4 ft 8 1/2 in (1,435 mm)

The Standard Lo-V (an abbreviation for “Low-Voltage car”) was a New York City Subway car type built from 1916 to 1925 by the Pressed Steel Car Company, American Car and Foundry, and Pullman Company for the IRT. A total of 1,020 cars were built, which consisted of 725 motors and 295 trailers. It was the third and most common "Lo-V" type car ordered for the IRT (after the Flivver Lo-Vs and the first Steinway Lo-Vs).

== Description ==
The Pullman Co. built the first orders of these cars in 1916 consisting of 123 plus 40 motors and 62 plus 15 trailers; in 1917, consisting of 337 motors and 140 trailers; in 1922, consisting of 100 trailers, and finally by American Car and Foundry in 1924 with 100 motors and 1925 with 125 motors. Car 5302, as part of the 1917 order, was a pay car from the very beginning and was never in passenger service.

Low-Vs were arranged in mixed trains consisting of trailer cars and motor cars. While trailer cars were equipped with brakes, but no air compressors or motors, motor cars were equipped with all three. However, of the last group of trailers consisting of 100 cars, 75 were equipped with compressors, stored on these cars to eventually be transferred to motor cars, presumably being held on these cars due to lack of shop space.

"Low-V" is short for "Low Voltage", which refers to the cars' form of propulsion control. Earlier Composite and "High-V" (High Voltage) equipment that ran on the IRT had utilized a 600 volt DC circuit that ran directly through the motorman's master controller to control the car's propulsion. The 600 volts was also trainlined through the whole train by the use of high voltage jumper cables, which had to be run between cars. However, the Low-V equipment used battery voltage (32 volts) in the motor control circuit to move high voltage (600 volts) contacts underneath the car, which would control the car's propulsion. Likewise, it would no longer be necessary to use 600 volt jumpers between cars. This tremendously improved the safety of the equipment for both train crews and shop personnel alike.

Standard Low-V cars also simplified braking for train crews. On IRT equipment, an electric brake could be utilized to synchronize a braking effort and apply each car's brakes simultaneously and uniformly throughout the train. This was different from operating strictly using air (pneumatically), which was less responsive, but would still stop the train albeit more slowly. Low-V cars simplified the braking process. On earlier IRT equipment, the braking notches were different for a motorman, depending on whether or not he was operating electrically or pneumatically. On Low-V cars, the notches were identical, regardless of whether or not the electric brake was active. The braking system on a Low-V car is known as AMUE.

In 1921, all low voltage cars, including the Flivvers and Steinways - were equipped with MUDC or multiple-unit door operation. All cars subsequently acquired had it already built in as part of their equipment.

22 of the older trailers, along with 8 Flivver trailers, were converted to Steinway motors in 1929 to relieve an equipment shortage on the Queens Division; the IRT at the time being financially unable to purchase new equipment for the purpose.

== History ==
The Low-Vs served much of their time mainly on the Lexington Avenue Express and 7th Avenue–180th Street Bronx Park Express services, with a few additionally on the Broadway–7th Ave.–Van Cortlandt Park 242nd St. Express by interlining due to an insufficient number of High-Vs filling out the assigned services. At times, several appeared on the Queens Flushing and Astoria services as well.

In 1952, with the shuffling of equipment to save on crews, the few Low-Vs on the Broadway Express were no longer needed for that service. A few, however, were used in Lenox Ave. Local service on weekends. In late 1958 through early 1959, several Low-Vs, following the Flivvers and regular Steinways, appeared on the two West Side Locals, Broadway and Lenox Ave., to replace the last of the High-Vs still in service.

Around 1954–5, one car (5417) was fitted with additional light fixtures for brighter lighting, but the decision was made to instead rewire a few other cars with improved circuitry as with the IND R1–9s. Six cars were so equipped. These were 4800, 4953, 5095, 5285, 5416, 5440.

Two cars (5032, 5130) had a lowered ceiling and hand stanchions in place of the usual straps.

From August 1959 through December 1960, roughly 25 cars that had been modified for operation on the BMT Culver and Franklin Ave. Shuttle, by adding extensions on their sides at floor level to fill in the wider platform gaps on the B Division; this lasted only for a year and a half, after which the cars were returned to the IRT. Most were placed in work service, surviving for many years, but 3 of these cars were actually returned to IRT passenger service and were scrapped in due course as with other Low-Vs at the time. After 47 years of service, most of the Low-V cars were retired in 1963, spending their last days on the Lexington–Jerome Ave. Express line. Some cars, however, remained in service on the 7th Avenue–Lenox Express until February 1964. There were persistent reports of those appearing in those services later that year. A very small number of Low-Vs used on the Bowling Green–South Ferry shuttle that replaced the Deck Roof High-Vs - the previous fleet - in 1956 remained on the shuttle as late as August 1964. A handful number of trailer cars remained on the fragment of IRT Third Avenue Line in the Bronx to finish out their years until November 3, 1969.

Many Low-Vs were converted into work cars following their retirement from revenue service. They were eventually replaced by retired SMEE cars (Note: "SMEE car" refers to cars fitted with the Straight Air Motor Car Electric-Pneumatic Emergency (SMEE) braking system, including the R12, R14, R15, R17, R21, R22, R26, R28, R29, R33, R33S, and R36 models (the last 6 also being Redbird trains).) converted into work cars and were eventually all scrapped (but see below).

== Preservation ==
Preserved Sets of four out of seven remaining Lo-V cars at 207th Street Yard in Upper Manhattan

Seven Lo-V cars have survived into preservation. One is a trailer car, while the rest are motors.

- Car 4902 (trailer car) has been preserved by the New York Transit Museum and restored.
- Car 5290 (motor car) has been preserved by Railway Preservation Corp. and restored.
- Car 5292 (motor car) has been preserved by Railway Preservation Corp. and restored.
- Car 5443 (motor car) has been preserved by Railway Preservation Corp. and restored.
- Car 5466 (motor car) has been preserved by the Shore Line Trolley Museum in East Haven, Connecticut, and restored. It is modified with trolley poles and is used in various tourist rides around the museum.
- Car 5483 (motor car) has been preserved by Railway Preservation Corp. and restored.
- Car 5600 (motor car) has been preserved at the Trolley Museum of New York in Kingston, New York. It is currently undergoing a cosmetic restoration but is not currently operable.

Car 4605, the last of the former BMT shuttle cars and of the 1916 series, had been planned for preservation as well, but plans for it fell through. It had survived as late as 1980.

== See also ==
- Flivver Lo-V, a low voltage propulsion control IRT subway car built in 1915.
- Steinway Lo-V, a low voltage propulsion control IRT subway car built from 1915 to 1925.
- World's Fair Lo-V, a low voltage propulsion control IRT subway car built in 1938.
