= Flivver Lo-V (New York City Subway car) =

Retired class of New York City Subway car

- A Flivver Lo-V train with 4111 leading, entering Intervale Avenue
- Manufacturer: Pullman Company
- Replaced: 1962
- Constructed: 1915
- Refurbished: 1955–1958
- Number built: 178 (124 motors, 54 trailers)
- Number preserved: 0
- Number scrapped: 178
- Successor: R26; R28; R29; R33
- Fleet numbers: 4037–4160 (motors); 4161–4214 (trailers)
- Capacity: 196: 44 (seated) 152 (standing)
- Operators: Interborough Rapid Transit Company; NYC Board of Transportation; New York City Transit Authority

Specifications
- Car body construction: Steel
- Car length: 51 ft 0.5 in (15.56 m)
- Width: 8 ft 10 in (2,692 mm)
- Height: 11 ft 10.5 in (3,620 mm)
- Floor height: 3 ft 2 1/8 in (0.97 m)
- Doors: 6
- Maximum speed: 60 mph (97 km/h)
- Weight: Motor car: 77,700 lb (35,200 kg); Trailer car: 55,600 lb (25,200 kg)
- Traction system: Motor car: GE PC8 or PC10 using Westinghouse 300 or GE 212 motors (200 hp each). Two motors per car (both on motor truck, trailer truck not motorized). Trailer car: None; Air Compressor: WABCO D-2-F
- Power output: 200 hp (149 kW) per traction motor
- Electric systems: 600 V DC third rail
- Current collection: Top running contact shoe
- Braking systems: WABCO Schedule AMRE with R type triple valve, ME-21 brake stand, and simplex tread brake rigging
- Coupling system: WABCO F
- Headlight type: Kerosene light
- Track gauge: 4 ft 8 1/2 in (1,435 mm)

The Flivver Lo-V was a New York City Subway car type built in 1915 by the Pullman Company for the IRT and its successors, which included the New York City Board of Transportation and the New York City Transit Authority. The name Flivver originates from a slang term of the same name used during the early part of the 20th century to refer to any small car that gave a rough ride.

== Service history ==
As with all High-Vs and the first standard Low-Vs in service, the Flivvers ran on the original IRT mainline express, which utilized the modern day IRT Broadway–Seventh Avenue Line north of 42nd Street on Broadway and Seventh Avenue, the modern day 42nd Street Shuttle, and the modern day IRT Lexington Avenue Line south of 42nd Street on Park Avenue South. Following the 1918 IRT expansion into the modern "H" system that serves Manhattan's East and West sides separately with the 42nd Street Shuttle connecting them, the Flivvers ran primarily on the Seventh Avenue–180th St. Bronx Park Express. Later, beginning in 1952, the cars were reassigned to the Lexington Ave.–Woodlawn Jerome Ave. Express service, possibly to keep both services operating on the West Farms Line to 180th St. and 241st St. solid with standard Low-V equipment, to simplify interlining moves. Eventually, they were on all three express services: 7th Ave.–East 180th St., Lexington–Jerome Ave., Lexington Ave.–White Plains Rd. However, from mid-1958 to the West Side Changeover in February 1959, many Flivvers, joined by several Low-Vs and regular Steinways, were transferred to the two West Side Local services, Broadway and Lenox Ave., to replace the last remaining High-Vs used in those services, still in 5 car trains. Eventually, with all trailers removed from service in 1960, the motor cars were operated in consists of all motors. These cars were relegated to the Lexington Ave.–241st St. White Plains Rd. Express service where they spent their last days before finally being retired in 1962.

Originally, when various High-V groups were delivered and readied for service, many drew their motors from the Composite fleet. However, to get these cars into service faster, new motors were ordered to supply the remaining cars. This continued until the delivery of all High-Vs was completed by 1911.

In 1915, as part of the Dual Contracts expansion of service, to provide additional express service on the elevated lines, the Composites were rebuilt for the purpose. They were given new motors, new trucks, and low voltage equipment with the AMUE braking system, which was fast becoming the industry standard. All cars thus converted became motor cars.

As a result, it became necessary to provide replacements for the High-V cars to serve as trailers. 478 car bodies were ordered from Pullman in an equivalent number to replace the remaining Composites still in service, and these bodies were placed on the old Composite trucks.

The cars, numbered 4037–4514, all had provisions for cabs in the event that they were converted to motor cars, which actually did occur with a number of them. However, a problem immediately presented itself.

The IRT found itself with 124 Composite motor cars that had not been converted to trailers but still retained their motors. They clearly did not wish to go back to using a high voltage operating system for these cars, or else high voltage control systems may not have been available any longer. However, in the original assumption that all cars would be High-V trailers, they had already ordered the older AMRE braking system for this group. The result was that they ended up with a hybrid car, using the older AMRE braking system but with a low voltage control system. Rather unique to the IRT system, these cars became known as the Flivvers, named after the apparatus used to control the doors that resembled the windup device on old type automobiles to start their engines.

In addition to the 124 cars that became Flivver motors, another group of 62 cars was set aside to become trailers for this type. The remaining 292 cars of the order became High-V trailers as originally planned.

Because of their unique combination of motor propulsion and braking equipment, these cars were not able to operate with either the older High-V cars or the later standard Low-V cars in future orders. Moreover, because they did not ride smoothly and often bucked when not coupled up in a certain combination of cars, they were never cut under normal conditions. On Sundays, when shorter trains were operated, the Flivvers were normally laid up, out of service. However, according to some G.O.'s from the early 1950s, in the event of severe wintry weather such as snowstorms, the personnel were directed to operate as many trains of Flivvers as possible.

In 1921, in company with the Low-Vs and Steinways, all Flivvers, being low voltage cars, were converted to MUDC practically in one fell swoop. In 1929, to cover a shortage of equipment on the Queens Division, the IRT being financially unable to purchase additional equipment at the time, 8 of the trailers were converted to Steinway motors along with 22 Low-V trailers to provide for the needed additional equipment.

Around 1955, a single car (4130) was rewired with improved circuitry for brighter lighting, much as the IND R1–9s had received.

In 1958, a ten-car train of these cars was painted, including the lower window sashes of the entire cars. Passengers raised an objection to this, and it was removed.

The trailers last ran in service in 1960, leaving the motor cars to fill out consists of all motors, which continued in service until August 1962. None were saved for museum purposes.

== See also ==
- Steinway Lo-V, a low voltage propulsion control IRT subway car built from 1915 to 1925.
- Standard Lo-V, a low voltage propulsion control IRT subway car built from 1916 to 1925.
- World's Fair Lo-V, a low voltage propulsion control IRT subway car built in 1938.
