= Steinway Lo-V (New York City Subway car) =

Retired class of New York City Subway car

- A Steinway Lo-V train entering 167th Street
- Manufacturers: Pressed Steel Car Company, American Car and Foundry, Pullman Company
- Constructed: 1915–1925
- Number built: 138 cars (138 motors)
- Number preserved: 0
- Number scrapped: 138
- Successor: R26; R28; R29; R33; R36
- Fleet numbers: 4025–4036, 4215–4222, 4555–4576, 4700–4718, 4720–4771, 5628–5652 (all motors)
- Capacity: 196: 44 (seated) 152 (standing)
- Operators: Interborough Rapid Transit Company; NYC Board of Transportation; New York City Transit Authority

Specifications
- Car body construction: Steel
- Car length: 51 ft 6 in (15.70 m)
- Width: 8 feet 11 5/16 inches (2.73 m)
- Height: 12 feet (3.66 m)
- Floor height: 3 ft 2 1/8 in (0.97 m)
- Doors: 6
- Maximum speed: 60 mph (97 km/h)
- Weight: ~ 74,000 lb (33,600 kg)
- Traction system: Motor car: Westinghouse 577, General Electric 260 Air Compressor: WABCO D-2-F
- Prime mover: Electric motor
- Power output: 105 hp (78 kW) (WH 302, one car), 120 hp (89 kW) (WH 302F, 302F1, GE 240C, 259)
- Electric systems: 600 V DC third rail
- Current collection: Top running contact shoe
- Braking systems: WABCO Schedule AMUE with UE-5 universal valve, ME-23 brake stand, and simplex clasp brake rigging
- Coupling system: WABCO J
- Headlight type: incandescent light bulbs
- Track gauge: 4 ft 8 1/2 in (1,435 mm)

The Steinway Lo-V was a New York City Subway car type built from 1915 to 1925 by the Pressed Steel Car Company, American Car and Foundry, and Pullman Company. These cars were built specifically for use on the IRT Corona Line (currently known as the IRT Flushing Line), and the IRT Astoria Line (currently known as the BMT Astoria Line). They had special gear ratios to climb the steep grades (4.5%) in the Steinway Tunnels, something standard IRT equipment could not do.

== History ==
The Steinways were among the first low voltage cars delivered to the IRT, starting with the 12 car order from Pressed Steel Car Company in 1915. Pullman then built and delivered 71 Steinway cars in 1916. In 1925, American Car and Foundry delivered 25 Steinway cars, which would be the last standard body IRT cars built. The last Steinways placed in service were 30 cars converted from 22 Low-V trailers, followed by 8 Flivver trailers in 1929. These latter cars were originally built as part of the 1915 and 1916 orders from Pullman. In 1921, all low-voltage cars thus far delivered, including standard, Flivver, and Steinway Low-Vs, were converted to MUDC operation. All cars delivered subsequently came provided with this feature. (MUDC stands for Multiple Unit Door Control, a system enabling a conductor to operate the doors of several cars from an operating position.)

The original 12 cars from 1915 were equipped with the same type of automatic couplers that were developed on the BMT AB Standards, but the IRT found this equipment troublesome and difficult to handle. The cars operated isolated in special consists for many years, until immediately following the 1929 conversions mentioned above, the couplers on these cars were finally converted to the same type typical of other IRT cars. The IRT finally had a sizable fleet of Steinway motors, to be expanded in 1938 upon arrival of the World's Fair type from St. Louis Car Co.

Immediately after the arrival of these latter cars, the IRT converted the signs and sign box assemblies to those used on the new cars.

The Steinways served the Flushing and Astoria lines until 1950, when they were displaced by the R12, R14, and R15 cars. They were then transferred to the IRT mainline, displaying a distinctively different appearance from other IRT cars. All Steinways, World's Fair type included, had a striking light green interior paint scheme, reflecting how the BMT was painting its own cars while the Steinways were being maintained at the Coney Island Shops. The regular Steinways had once again the original type of large sign and box assemblies restored; however, this was done as cheaply as possible. Instead of the hooks holding the destination sign plates in place, they now had screwed on latches, and the top route sign lacked the frame receptacle typical of that in other IRT cars, giving it a somewhat naked appearance. Additionally, being that these cars, unlike other car types on the IRT, were divided into several small separated groups as it was necessary to distinguish them from other types. This was done by painting a red line outside under the number as a warning to yardmen not to couple these cars to other types. These were similar to the white lines painted outside on various High-Vs.

Upon arrival on the mainline, the cars were assigned to Broadway, mainly on the Broadway–7th Ave.–Van Cortlandt Park 242nd St. Express, with one train used from time to time on the Broadway Local as well. They were used in combination with the High-Vs and few Low-Vs, which continued being used here until 1952, when an equipment shuffle for the purpose of economizing on crews transferred the cars to the Lexington Ave.–Pelham Bay Local, joining the World's Fair cars already in use. This enabled all trains in this service on weekends and nights, using these cars, to operate using only one conductor. The High-Vs, including many Gibbs cars, were transferred to the Broadway–Van Cortlandt Park–242nd St. Express, which used two conductors per train anyway.

After being displaced by the arriving R17s, they were moved to other lines, mainly the 7th Ave.–East 180th St., Lexington Ave.–Jerome Ave. and White Plains Rd. Expresses. Some cars were transferred to the fragment of the 3rd Ave. El in the Bronx to replace the last of the old MUDC cars from the Manhattan El lines and other El shuttles until the demise of those services or the establishment of through subway service to Dyre Ave. Additionally, in late 1958 through early 1959, some of these cars, following the Flivvers and standard Low-Vs, were moved to the two West Side Broadway and Lenox Ave. Locals to replace the last High-Vs in service remaining on those lines. The cars continued on the three express services until 1963 when most of them were retired. A small number remained on the fragment of the 3rd Ave El in the Bronx to finish out their years, until November 3, 1969.

It should be mentioned that a very interesting swap occurred right after unification. Car 4719 was in the Lenox Ave. Shops for heavy long-term repairs. The only way cars could be transferred between the Queens Division and the mainline of the IRT at the time was via the 2nd Ave. El Queensboro Bridge Connection, due to close on June 13, 1942. It was seen that the car would not be ready for service by that date. As a result, car 4719 remained on the mainline and operated as a Low-V motor, and car 4771 was converted to a Steinway motor and sent to the Queens Division. When the cars were all in mainline service after 1950, it caused a bit of confusion as car 4719 received the red line outside, indicating it as a Steinway in error. As soon as the yardmen discovered the error, the line had to be rubbed out as it was now a standard Low-V motor.

In 1958, a full ten-car train of these cars was completely painted, including the lower window sashes throughout the entire cars. Passengers objected to this, and it was removed soon after.

Upon retirement, a few Steinway cars had been placed in work service, and in the process, their original Steinway trucks were removed and replaced with heavier Standard Low-V motor trucks, which were sturdier and better adapted for work service. No examples of the standard Steinway motor cars survive today, although car 4025 at one time was considered for this purpose, as were 4 of the last remaining 1925 series cars (5633, 5641, 5650, 5651) in the 3rd Ave. El service at the very end.

== Similar cars ==
The 1938 World's Fair Low-V was technically a "Steinway" car, as it also contained the special gear ratios required to climb the grades of the Steinway Tunnels. However, the World's Fair Low-V had a significantly different body style; despite operationally exactly like a regular Steinway, it is considered a separate and distinct car class and not included in the "Steinway" grouping.

== See also ==
- Flivver Lo-V, a low voltage propulsion control IRT subway car built in 1915.
- Standard Lo-V, a low voltage propulsion control IRT subway car built from 1916 to 1925.
- World's Fair Lo-V, a low voltage propulsion control IRT subway car built in 1938.
