= World's Fair Lo-V (New York City Subway car) =

Retired class of New York City Subway car

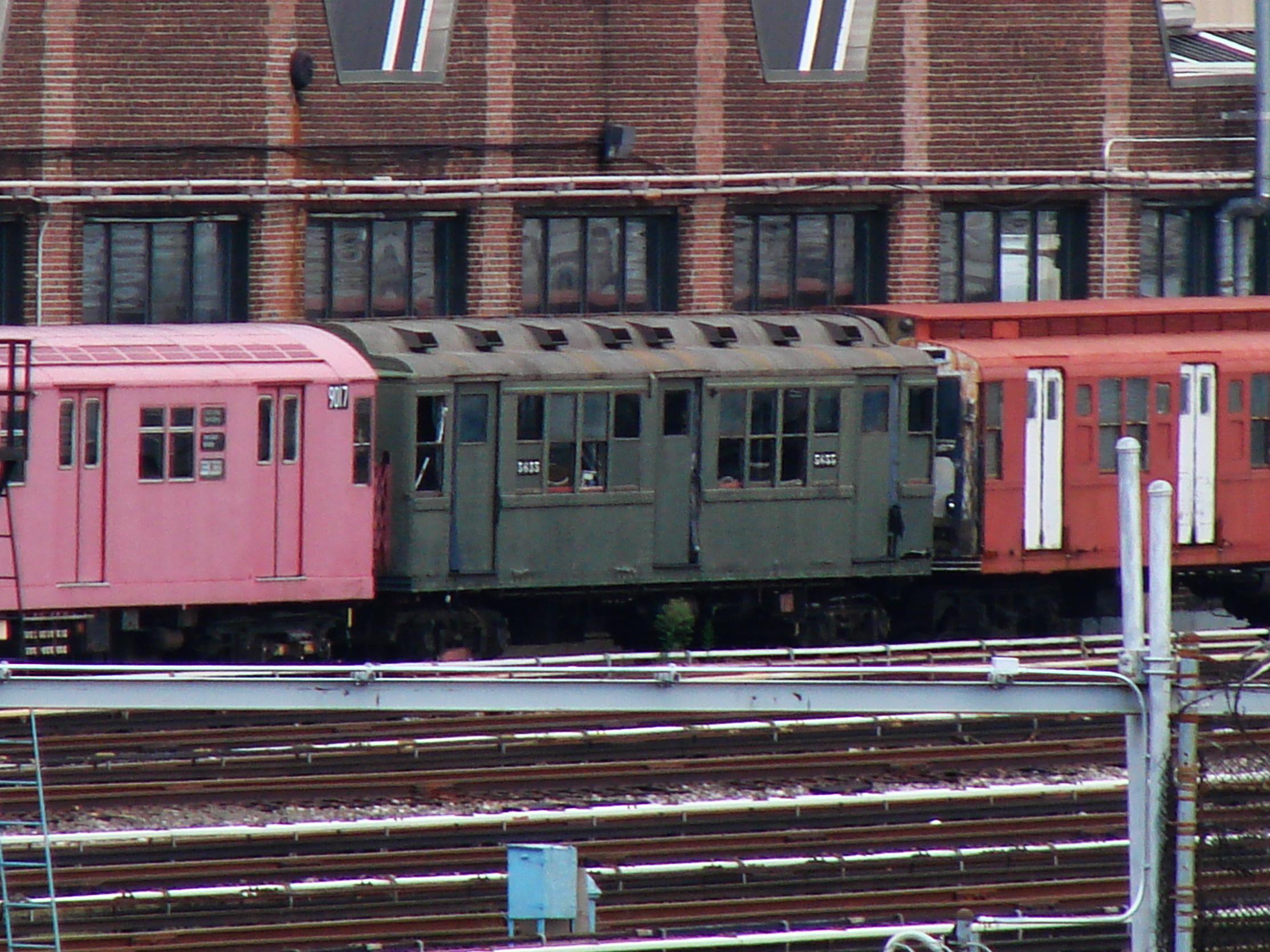
- World's Fair Lo-V car 5655 at the 207th Street Yard.
- Manufacturer: St. Louis Car Company
- Constructed: 1938
- Number built: 50
- Number preserved: 1
- Number scrapped: 49
- Fleet numbers: 5653–5702
- Capacity: 48 (seating), 154 (standing)
- Operators: Interborough Rapid Transit; NYC Board of Transportation; New York City Transit Authority

Specifications
- Car body construction: Steel
- Car length: 51 ft 0 in (15.54 m)
- Width: 8 ft 11.3125 in (2,726 mm)
- Height: 11 ft 10.625 in (3,623 mm)
- Doors: 6
- Weight: 75,130 lb (34,078 kilograms)
- Traction system: Westinghouse UP231B with Westinghouse 336A1 traction motors (125 hp each). Two motors per motor truck.
- Power output: 125 hp (93 kW) per traction motor
- Electric systems: 600 V DC third rail
- Current collection: Top running contact shoe
- Track gauge: 4 ft 8 1/2 in (1,435 mm)

The World's Fair Lo-V was a New York City Subway car type built in 1938 by the St. Louis Car Company in St. Louis, Missouri. These 50 cars were ordered for the IRT Flushing Line in preparation for the 1939 World's Fair. They were the fourth and last "Lo-V" type cars that were ordered (after the Flivver Lo-Vs, Steinway Lo-Vs, and Standard Lo-Vs), and the last cars ordered for the IRT before the city takeover in 1940.

== Description ==
The mockup of the World's Fair Low-V placed on display at Grand Central was numbered 6000. The production fleet followed in numerical succession from the previous order was numbered 5653–5702. These cars were all motor cars. They were modified variants of the standard IRT Steinway/Low-V body, with a body style based on the designs of the BMT AB Standards and IND R1–9s. This included an ogee-styled roof (which on the last 10 cars were insulated), a door arrangement similar to those of BMT cars (eliminating vestibules), end destination rollsigns and insert marker lights, smaller size sign plates on the side that could more easily be changed at terminals, and a single circuit lighting hookup (similar to what the IND cars had). Additionally, these cars were single-ended units, with the operator's controls on one end, and the conductor's controls on the opposite end, and the operator's controls and conductor's controls were mechanically interlocked.

While the cars cosmetically presented a more contemporary and more modern appearance, mechanically and electrically, they were Steinway cars and were compatible with the older Steinways, as they also contained the special gear ratios required to climb the steep grades (4.5%) of the Steinway Tunnels. However, as the body style of the World's Fair Steinway was significantly different, it was a separate and distinct car class and not included in the "Steinway" grouping, though for all intents and purposes, they were operationally the same as the regular Steinway cars.

== History ==
The World's Fair Steinways began service on the Flushing Line, which was the line closest to the 1939 World's Fair. After the fair closed, they continued to operate on that line until 1950, when they were displaced by the new R12, R14, and R15 subway cars. Afterward, they were sent to the IRT Lexington Ave–Pelham Bay Local, where they operated until 1956, when they were displaced by the new R17s. They were then assigned to the 7th Ave. Express services to Lenox Ave. and East 180th St. with 12 assigned to the 42nd St. Shuttle, displacing the Hedley High-Vs that had operated on this latter for many years. In 1962, deemed surplus by the vast number of new IRT subway cars being placed into service during this period, they were transferred to the IRT Third Avenue Line in the Bronx, where they spent their final years until they were replaced by the heavily modified R12s in late 1969. Many cars were converted into work motors, their Steinway trucks having been removed and replaced by heavier Standard Low-V motor trucks, deemed to be sturdier and better adapted for work service. A "3" was added in front of their original numbers, but were eventually replaced by retired SMEE cars converted into work cars in the 1990s. Half were scrapped around 1978 and the remainder many years later.

Car 5655 has been preserved by the New York Transit Museum but is not restored or operational at this time. It is currently in storage at the 207th Street Yard.

== See also ==
- Flivver Lo-V, a low voltage propulsion control IRT subway car built in 1915.
- Steinway Lo-V, a low voltage propulsion control IRT subway car built from 1915 to 1925.
- Standard Lo-V, a low voltage propulsion control IRT subway car built from 1916 to 1925.
