= Redbird trains =

Family of New York City Subway cars

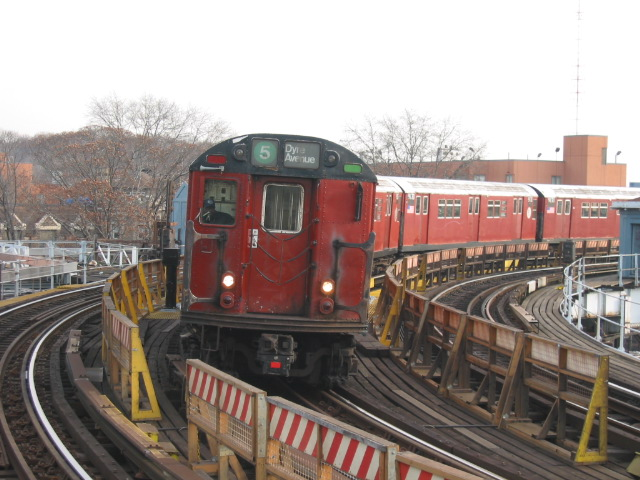
IRT Redbirds operating on the 5 on the IRT White Plains Road Line in April 2002.

The Redbird trains were a family of eight New York City Subway train models so-nicknamed because of their red paint scheme. The Redbirds totaled 1,410 cars of the following types on the A Division lines: R26, R28, R29, R33, R33S, and R36. There were also 550 cars on the B Division lines: R27 and R30/A, making a grand total of 1,960 cars built. All were built by the American Car and Foundry Company and the St. Louis Car Company.

These cars were painted a deep red to combat graffiti, which had become a major problem in the late 1970s and early 1980s. The color was referred to as "Gunn Red" or "Broad Street Red" in honor of its originator David L. Gunn, the former SEPTA General Manager who became President of the New York City Transit Authority during this period. Initially entering service in various colors, these cars received the new paint scheme between 1984 and 1989. Sixteen R17s were also given this paint scheme in 1985 and 1986, but were retired by 1988, well before the name "Redbird" caught on. Today, repurposed Redbird cars serve as garbage trains, rail adhesion cars, or rider cars on locomotive-hauled work trains, while others have been preserved by various museums.

== History ==
These cars were built by two different manufacturers.

- American Car and Foundry built the R26 cars in 1959–1960 and the R28 in 1960–1961.
- St. Louis Car Company built the R27 cars in 1960–1961, the R29 in 1962, the R30/A in 1961–1962, the R33 in 1962–1963, R33S single cars in late 1963, and the R36 in 1963–1964.

The IRT cars provided main passenger service on the 2, 4, 5, 6, and 7 trains, while the B Division cars provided passenger service on various BMT and IND lines. The IRT cars were occasionally used on Fan Trips on some B Division services as well.

=== Retirements and replacements ===
The BMT Redbirds were retired from 1989 to 1993, with the final R30 trip taking place on the C on June 25, 1993. Replaced by the R68 and R68A cars, most cars were scrapped at what is now Sims Metal Management's Newark facility. Most IRT Redbirds were phased out from 2001 to 2003 and replaced by the new R142 and R142A cars. The final trip made by a train consisting of IRT Redbirds was made on November 3, 2003, on the 7. 1,292 Redbirds have been sunk at sea off the coasts of Delaware (Redbird Reef), Georgia, New Jersey, South Carolina, and Virginia as artificial reefs to promote marine life, to serve as a barrier, and to enhance recreational scuba diving by Weeks Marine Inc.

== Preservation ==
Some Redbirds (R33s, R33Ss, and R36s) are used on the Train of Many Colors, including numerous historical subway cars in their original livery, all with contrasting colors. These cars are in the New York Transit Museum fleet. R28 pair 7926–7927 is preserved at the Illinois Railway Museum in Union, Illinois, with trolley poles added for the ability to run on the museum's mainline. R33S 9327 is at the Seashore Trolley Museum, also modified with trolley poles for operation at the site. Two R30s in its Redbird scheme: cars 8481 and 8522, survive in storage at 207th Street Yard.

== Other usage of Redbird name ==
- The MBTA Red Line in Boston used the "Redbird" name starting in the 1980s when that line's rolling stock was repainted into a largely red scheme. However, that usage of "Redbird" followed a tradition set with those fleet's prior paint schemes ("Bluebirds" for the 01400s, "Silverbirds" for the 01500s and 01600s).

== Gallery ==
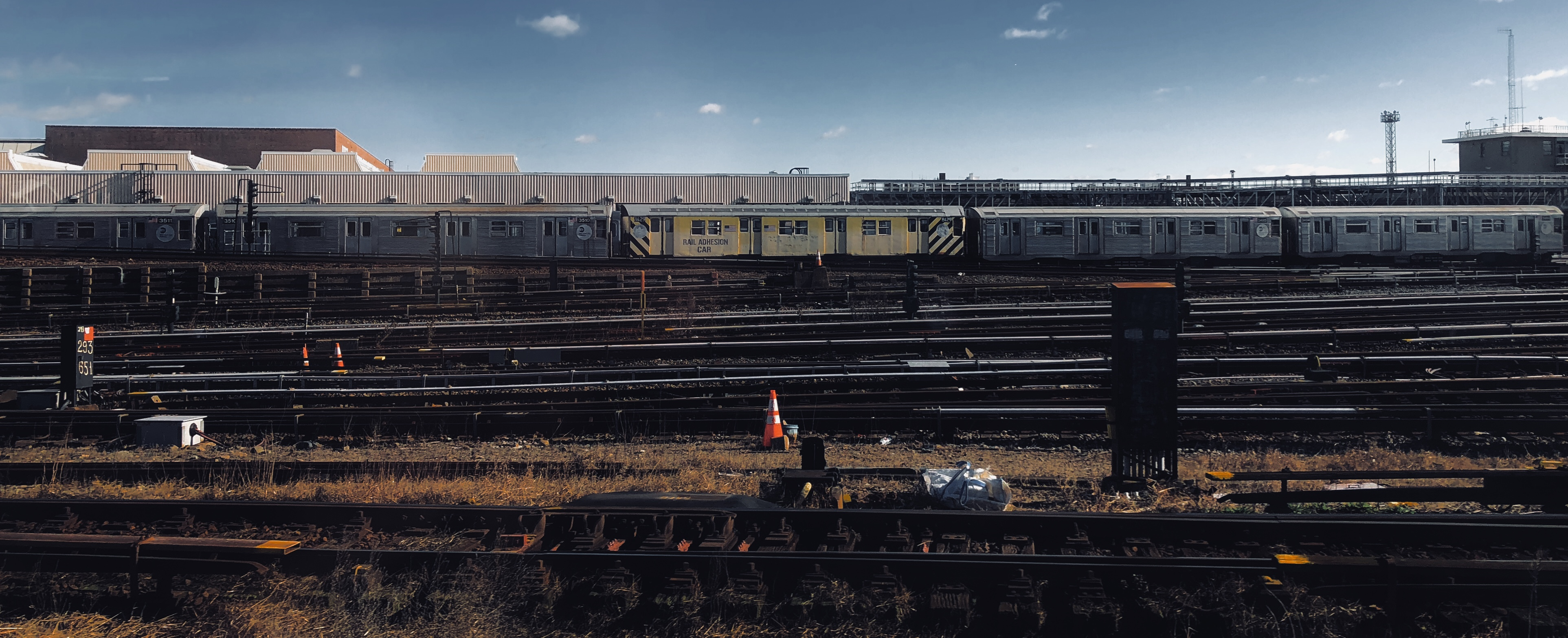
One of the BMT Redbirds as a converted Rail Adhesion Car with R32 work cars at Coney Island Complex

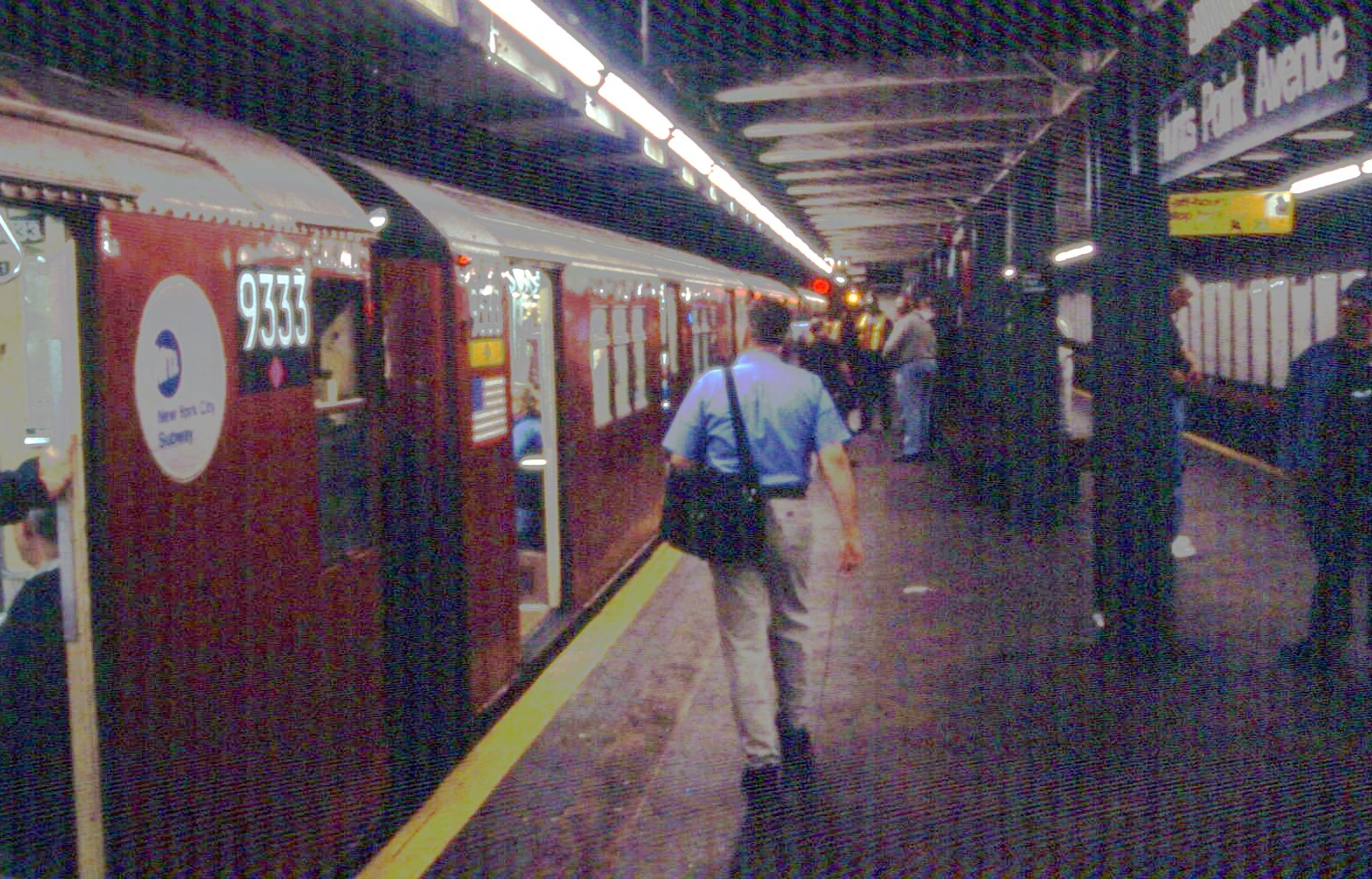
An IRT Redbird train at Hunts Point Avenue just before their retirement

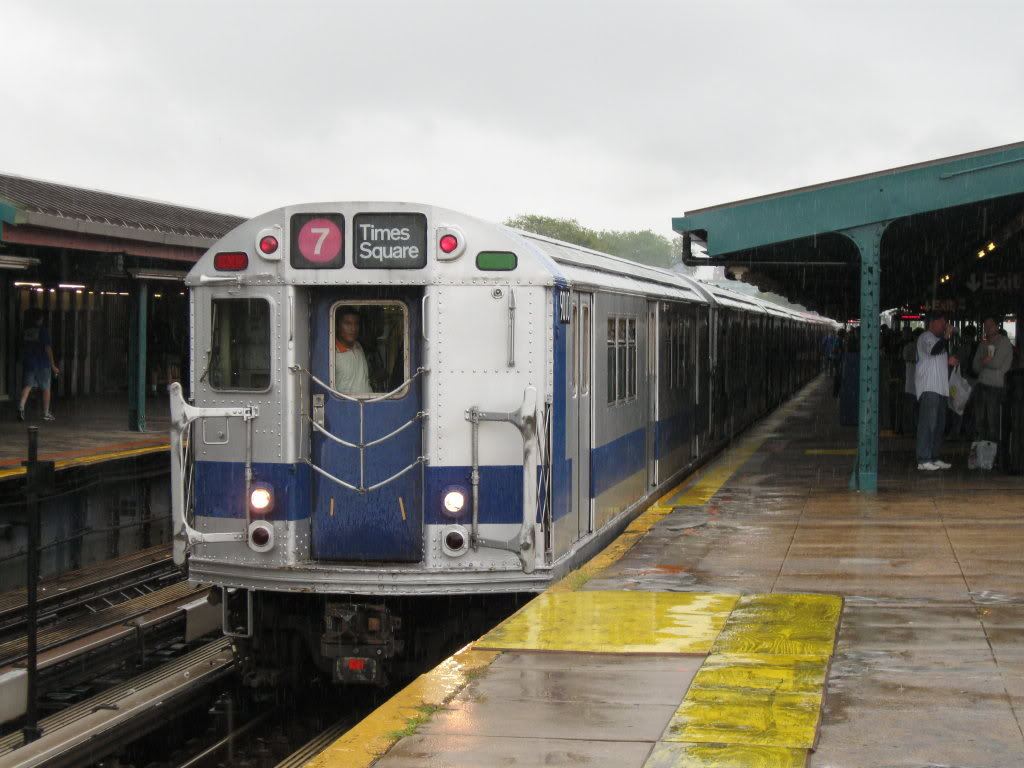
The Train of Many Colors, which consists of multiple IRT Redbird cars, some of which were repainted into paint schemes the cars wore before the GOH.

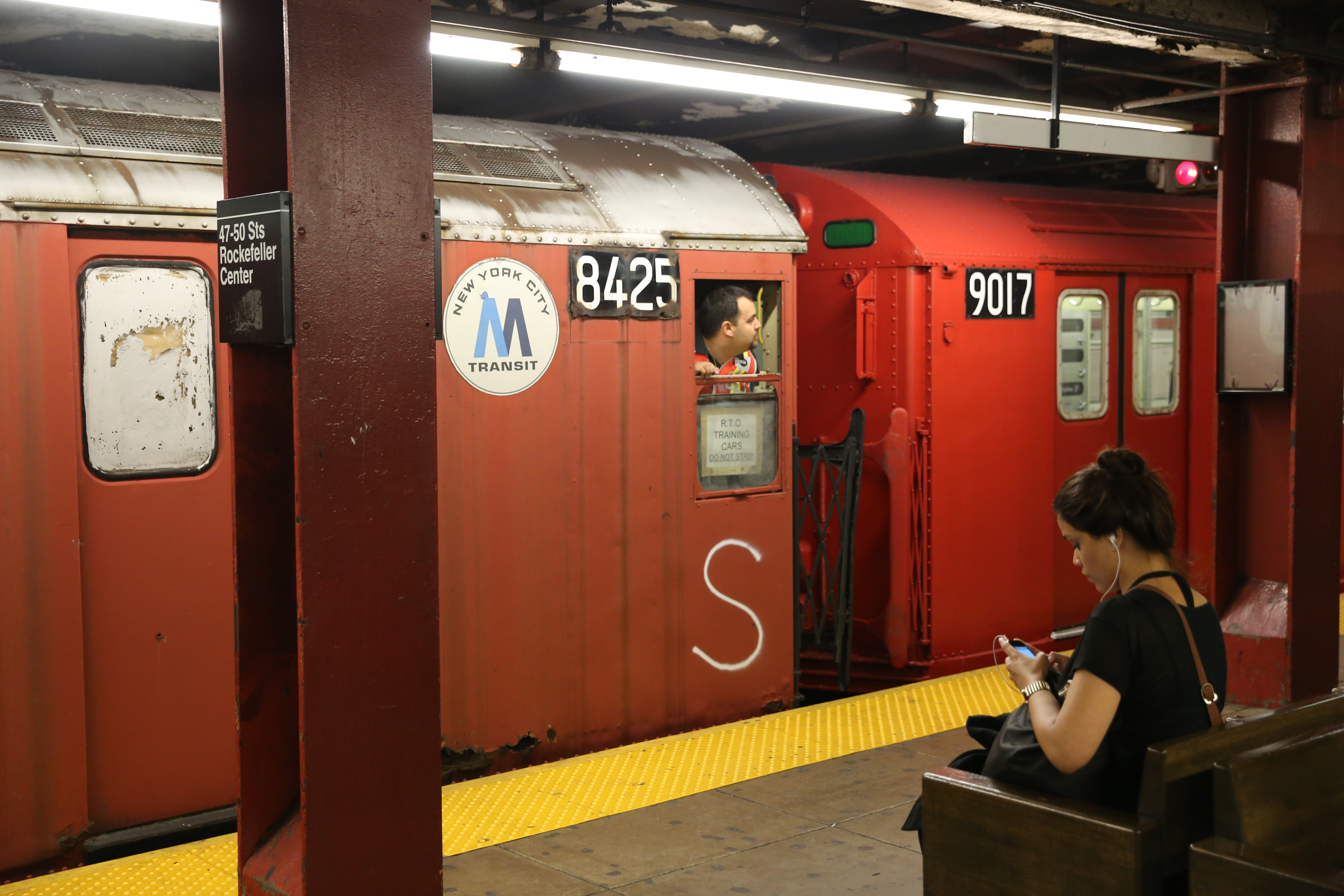
An R30 BMT Redbird (since scrapped) being used as a training car

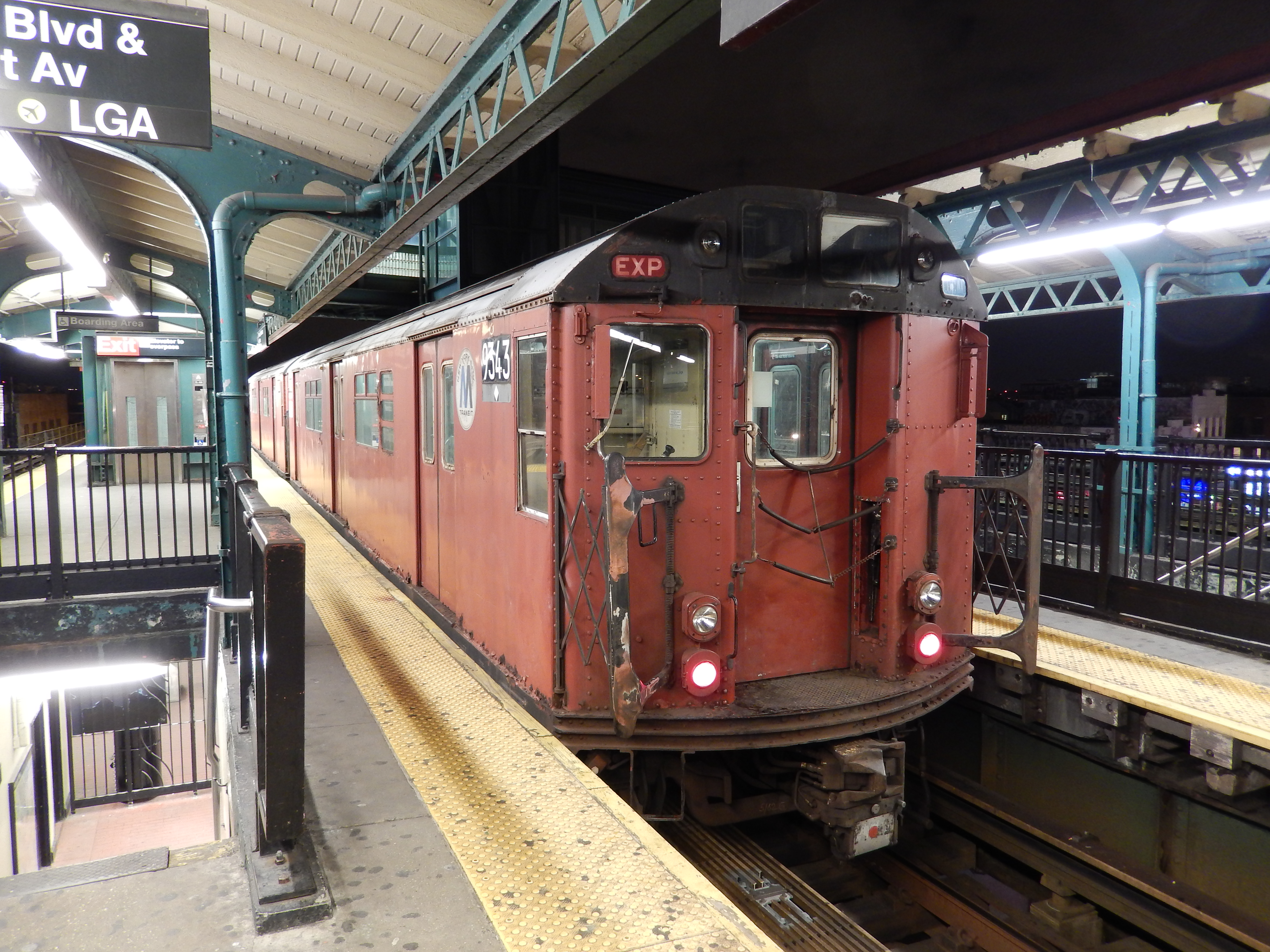
IRT Redbird trains for non-passenger service, taken at Junction Boulevard station in December 2014

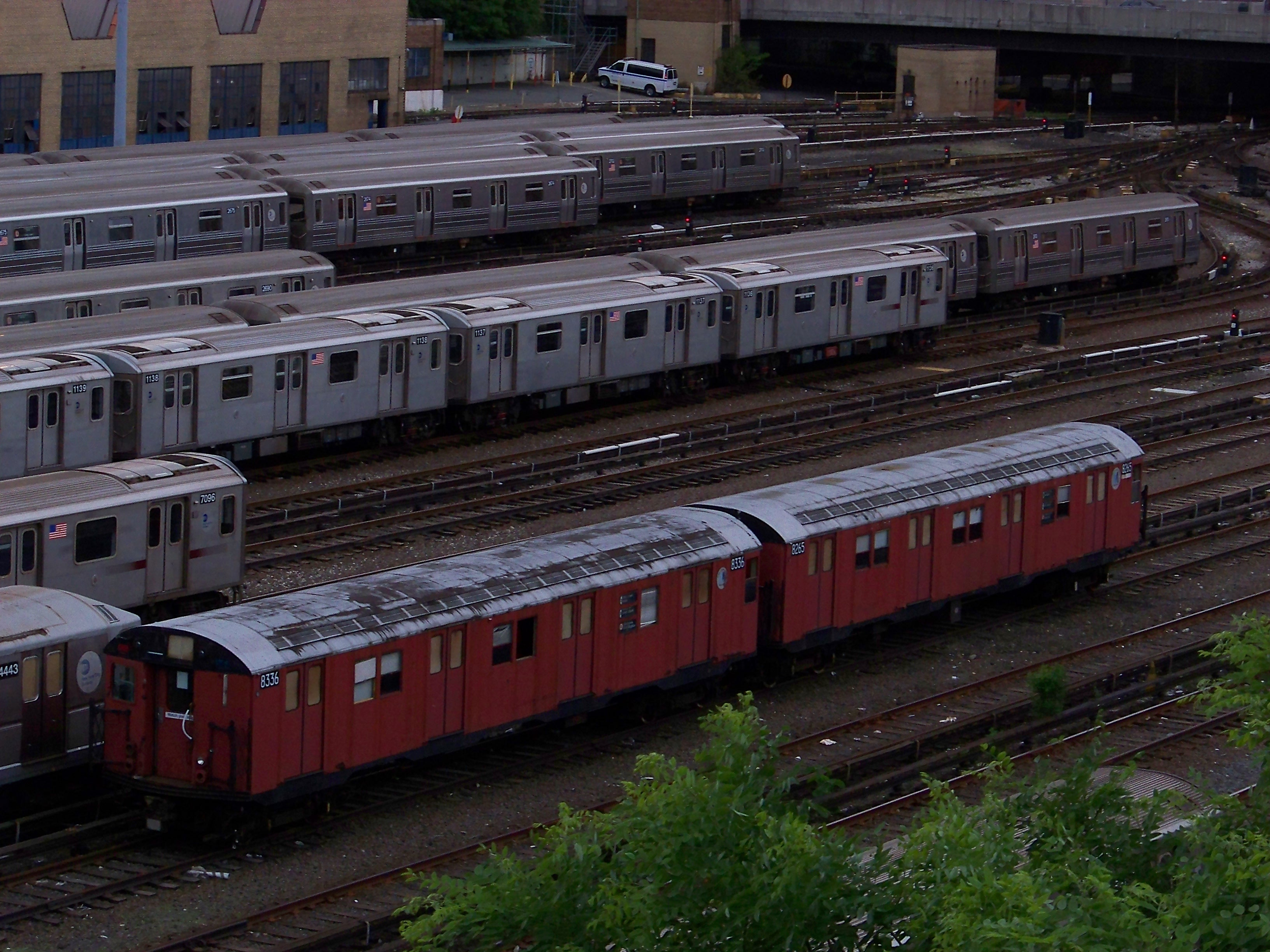
A pair of R30 BMT Redbirds (since scrapped) stored at Concourse Yard

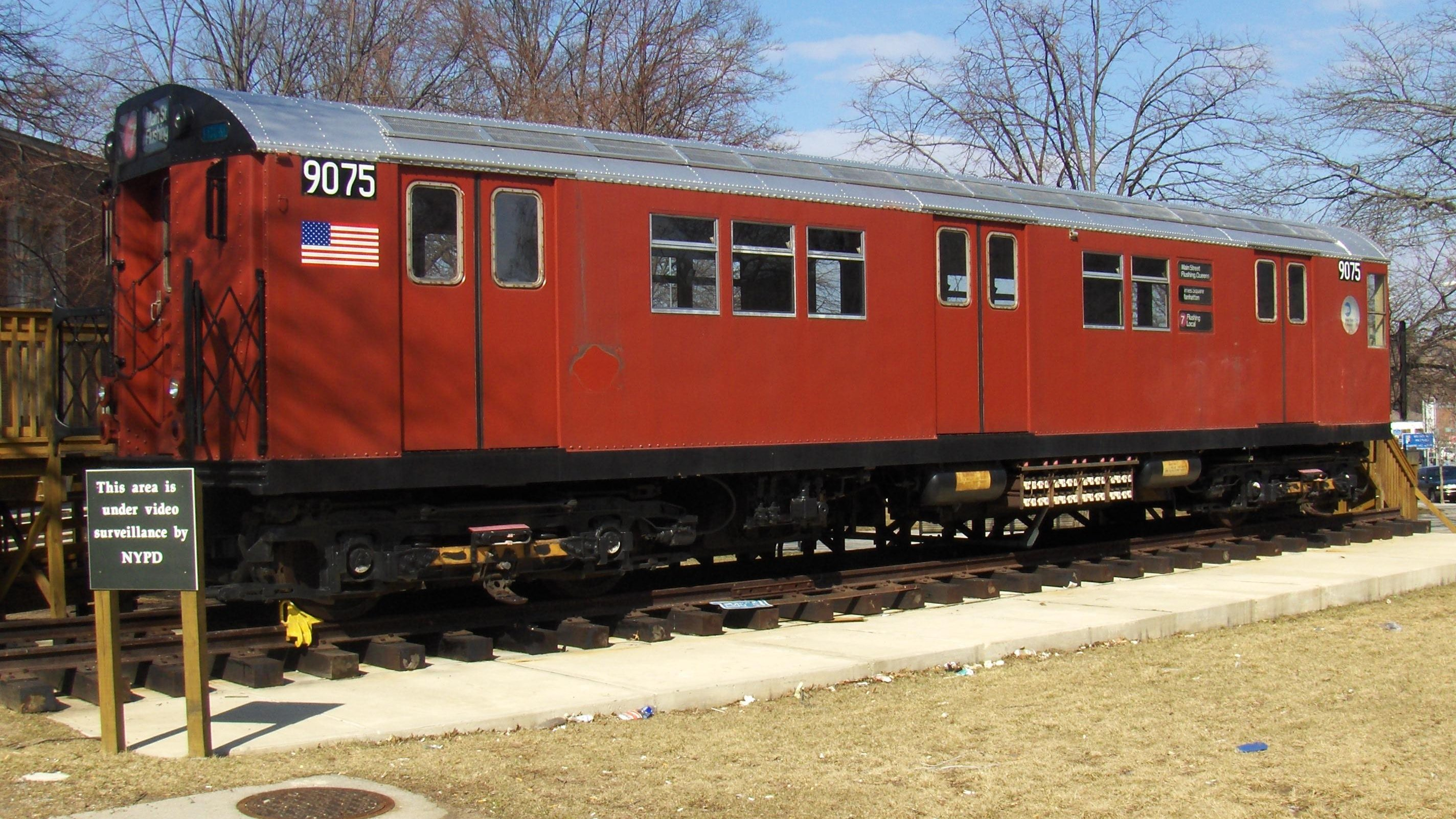
R33 #9075 on display at Queens Boro Hall/Queens County Supreme Court, prior to removal in 2022
