= R29/R99 (New York City Subway car) =

Retired class of New York City Subway car

R29
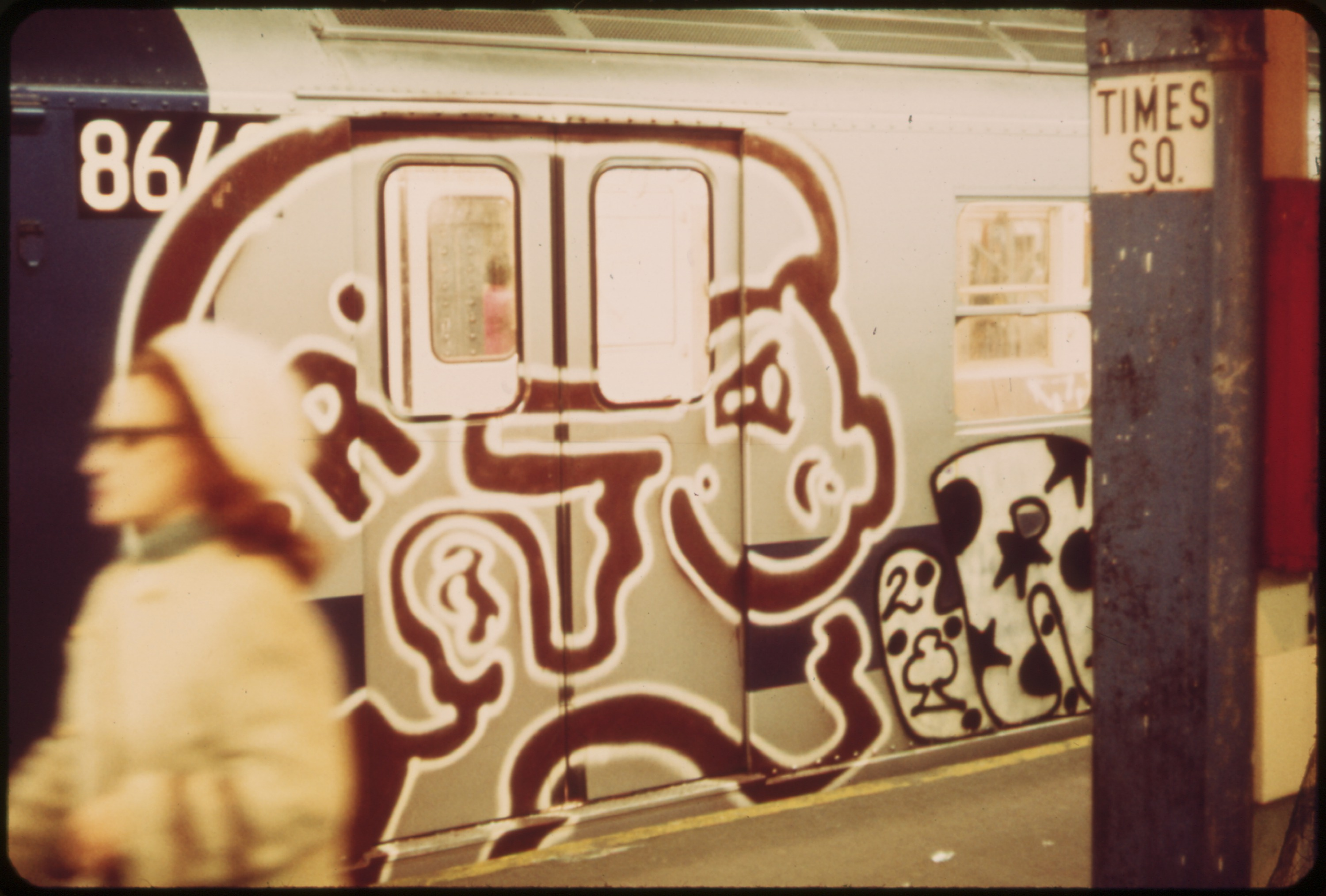
- A graffiti-covered R29 train at Times Square-42nd Street in May 1973
- In service: April 28, 1962 – October 24, 2002 (40 years)
- Manufacturer: St. Louis Car Company
- Built at: St. Louis, Missouri
- Family name: Redbirds
- Replaced: Many Steinway Lo-Vs; All Flivver Lo-Vs; Many Standard Lo-Vs
- Constructed: 1962
- Entered service: April 28, 1962
- Refurbished: 1985–1987
- Scrapped: 2001–2003
- Number built: 236
- Number preserved: 2
- Number scrapped: 234
- Successor: R142 and R142A
- Formation: Married Pairs
- Fleet numbers: 8570–8805
- Capacity: 44
- Operator: New York City Subway

Specifications
- Car body construction: LAHT carbon steel
- Car length: 51.04 feet (15.56 m)
- Width: 8.75 feet (2,667 mm)
- Height: 11.86 feet (3,615 mm)
- Doors: 6 sets of 50 inch wide side doors per car
- Maximum speed: 55 mph (89 km/h)
- Weight: 70,000 lb (31,751 kg) (post-rebuild)
- Traction system: General Electric 17KG192H3 or Westinghouse XCA248B
- Traction motors: General Electric 1257E1 or Westinghouse 1447J/JR (?)
- Power output: 115 hp (86 kW)
- Electric systems: 600 V DC third rail
- Current collection: Contact shoe
- Braking systems: WABCO, "SMEE" (electrodynamic)
- Track gauge: 4 ft 8 1/2 in (1,435 mm) standard gauge

The R29 was a New York City Subway car model built by the St. Louis Car Company in 1962 for the IRT A Division. A total of 236 cars were built, arranged in married pairs.

The R29s entered service on April 28, 1962, and received air conditioning by 1982. The fleet was rebuilt by Morrison–Knudsen between 1985 and 1987. The R29s were replaced in 2001 and 2002 with the delivery of the R142 and R142A cars, with the last train running on October 24, 2002. After being retired, most R29s were sunk into the ocean as artificial reefs, but two cars have survived.

== Description ==
The R29s were numbered 8570–8805. Between 1985 and 1987, the R29s were overhauled under contract R99. Therefore, the cars are also known as R99s in their post-overhaul state.

The R29s are very similar to appearance to the R26s and R28s, with the exceptions that they were built by a different company and permanently paired with link bars (instead of couplers).

The R29s were split into two sub groups:

- Cars 8570–8687 had Westinghouse electrical equipment
- Cars 8688–8805 had General Electric electrical equipment

The R29s wore several paint schemes during their service lives. They were the first subway cars to feature a bright red paint scheme since the R17s. In 1970–1975, the R29s were repainted into the MTA corporate silver and blue scheme. In 1982–1983, the R29s were repainted full white (roof, bonnets, and sides were all painted white) in an attempt to combat graffiti. During rebuilding by Morrison–Knudsen at Hornell, New York, from 1985 to 1987, the R29s were repainted into Redbirds with a deep maroon red body, black front bonnets and anti-climbers, and a silver roof.

Four cars (pairs 8686–8687 and 8804–8805) were tested with G70 trucks. The use of these trucks was discontinued in 1970.

== History ==
=== Early history ===
The first set of R29s debuted on the 7 service on April 28, 1962. After initial in-service testing, the first train of R29s (8570–8579) operated on the 7 service as a special 10-car train on April 29, 1962. On May 1 of that year, it was transferred to the 1 service. The original intention was to assign all of these cars to the 7 service, while transferring the existing R12 and R14 cars to the mainline IRT services to begin replacing their existing Low-Voltage cars, many of which were approaching 50 years of age at the time. However, plans had changed, and it was decided to order new R33S single cars and R36 married pair cars to completely re-equip the 7 service in time for the new 1964–5 World's Fair exhibition in Flushing instead; these cars were also ordered during 1962.

The R29s were assigned exclusively to the 1 from May 1, 1962, until October 1, 1962, when some were moved to the 2, 3, 4, and 5. Then by March 1963, 50 R29s were also assigned to the 6. The R29s were assigned to all A Division routes except for the 7 and 42nd Street Shuttle until May 1965, when they were removed from the 1, 3, and 6, and all R29s were assigned to the 2, 4, and 5.

=== Late 1960s–Mid 1980s ===
By February 16, 1966, all Westinghouse cars were moved to the 1 and 3. A year later, in February 1967, Westinghouse cars 8570–8599 were reassigned to the 6 being displaced by R12s 5707–5729 coming back from work service.

The R29s were removed from the 4 in October 1976, and the GE cars were assigned to the 2 and 5. The Westinghouse cars were assigned to the 1, 3, and 6, with cars 8570–8599 being assigned to the 6, while cars 8600–8687 were assigned to the 1 and 3, except from July to August 1978, when 6 assigned cars 8570–8589 were assigned to the 4.

In January 1983, the R29s were removed from the 3 and 5, so the GE cars were assigned exclusively to the 2, while Westinghouse cars 8600–8687 were only assigned to the 1. From September to November 1983, GE cars 8734–8735 and 8804–8805 were assigned to the 7 to fill in for the R33Ss and World's Fair R36s while they were being rebuilt. On April 5, 1985, the R29s were returned to the 3 with cars 8600–8619 being assigned there.

=== Rebuilding ===
By 1982, all R29s received air conditioning as part of a retrofitting program to replace the cars' original Axiflow ceiling fans.

The R29s were rebuilt by Morrison–Knudsen in Hornell, New York as Redbirds between 1985 and 1987 under the R99 retrofitting program. Unlike the R26s and R28s, the R29s retained their original propulsion equipment after being rebuilt.

In June 1985, the first 10 GE R29s were removed from service to be sent to Morrison–Knudsen in Hornell, New York for rebuilding. After being rebuilt, the cars returned to MTA property in September 1985. The cars then entered service on the 2 on October 21, 1985. By the end of February 1986, the last un-rebuilt GE R29s were removed from service on the 2, which were cars 8722–8723, 8746–8747, 8748–8749, 8752–8753, and 8788–8789. By June 10, 1986, all rebuilt GE cars were in service except for mis-mated pair 8702–8723, which did not return from rebuilding until all cars were rebuilt.

The first pair of Westinghouse R29s, which were cars 8660–8661, were removed from service by the end of February 1986 to be sent to Morrison–Knudsen in Hornell, New York, for rebuilding along with the last un-rebuilt GE cars. The first Westinghouse cars assigned to the 3 were removed from service for rebuilding in March 1986. From April to early May 1986, with the arrival of the then new R62As on the 1, half of the Westinghouse R29s assigned to that route were displaced to the 6, paving the way for Westinghouse cars 8570–8599 already assigned there to be sent for rebuilding beginning at the end of May. During this time, the remaining R29s were again removed from the 3. The first pair of rebuilt Westinghouse cars, which were cars 8660–8661, were placed into service on the 2 on May 14, 1986, blending in with the rebuilt R26s, R28s, and GE R29s.

By June 2, 1986, as more R62As entered service on the 1, the remaining 26 Westinghouse cars assigned to the 1 were displaced to the 3. Those cars were then gradually transferred to the 6, with the last 8 cars, 8624–8625, 8664–8665, 8670–8671, and 8682–8683, being transferred on June 25, 1986.

By the end of June 1986, 8 more rebuilt Westinghouse R29s entered service on the 2, joining the first rebuilt Westinghouse pair already there. By July 10, 1986, the 18 rebuilt Westinghouse cars in service were moved from the 2 to the 6, but by August 16, 1986, 18 more rebuilt Westinghouse cars entered service on the 2. A week later, 2 of the rebuilt Westinghouse R29s assigned to the 2, which were cars 8640–8641, were moved to the 6, and the rebuilt Westinghouse were gradually transferred from the 2 to the 6 when the last 10 cars, 8634–8635, 8652–8653, 8656–8657, 8668–8669, and 8676–8677, were moved to the 6 on September 9, 1986.

In early December 1986, the last 4 un-rebuilt Westinghouse cars, which were 8570–8571 and 8598–8599, were removed from service on the 6. By May 6, 1987, all rebuilt Westinghouse cars were in service. By October 22, 1987, all rebuilt cars were in service.

After rebuilding, all General Electric R29s were assigned exclusively to the 2 until May 1995, when all of the cars were moved to the 5 to improve fleet reliability. Meanwhile, all Westinghouse cars were assigned exclusively to the 6.

=== Retirement ===
In April 1997, the MTA awarded contracts to Bombardier and Kawasaki for the delivery and purchase of new subway cars (the R142 and R142A) in order to retire the R29s, as well as the other A Division Redbird trains. In June 2001, Delaware agreed to acquire 400 cars being retired amongst the A Division Redbird fleet, including the R29s, to create artificial reefs 16 miles off the coast of the state. The fleet began being withdrawn from service in July, with the first cars being reefed in August. The last ten cars on the active roster (numbered 8708–8709, 8716–8717, 8718–8719, 8784–8785, and 8786–8787) made their last trip on the 5 on October 24, 2002.

After retirement, all but one pair was stripped of all parts and sunk into the Atlantic Ocean to create artificial reefs. Today, cars 8678–8679 are the only surviving R29s. This pair was retained for work service and stored at the Unionport Yard until July 2013, when the pair was moved to Concourse Yard for storage, along with R26s 7774–7775 and R28s 7924–7925.
