= R26 (New York City Subway car) =

Retired class of New York City Subway car

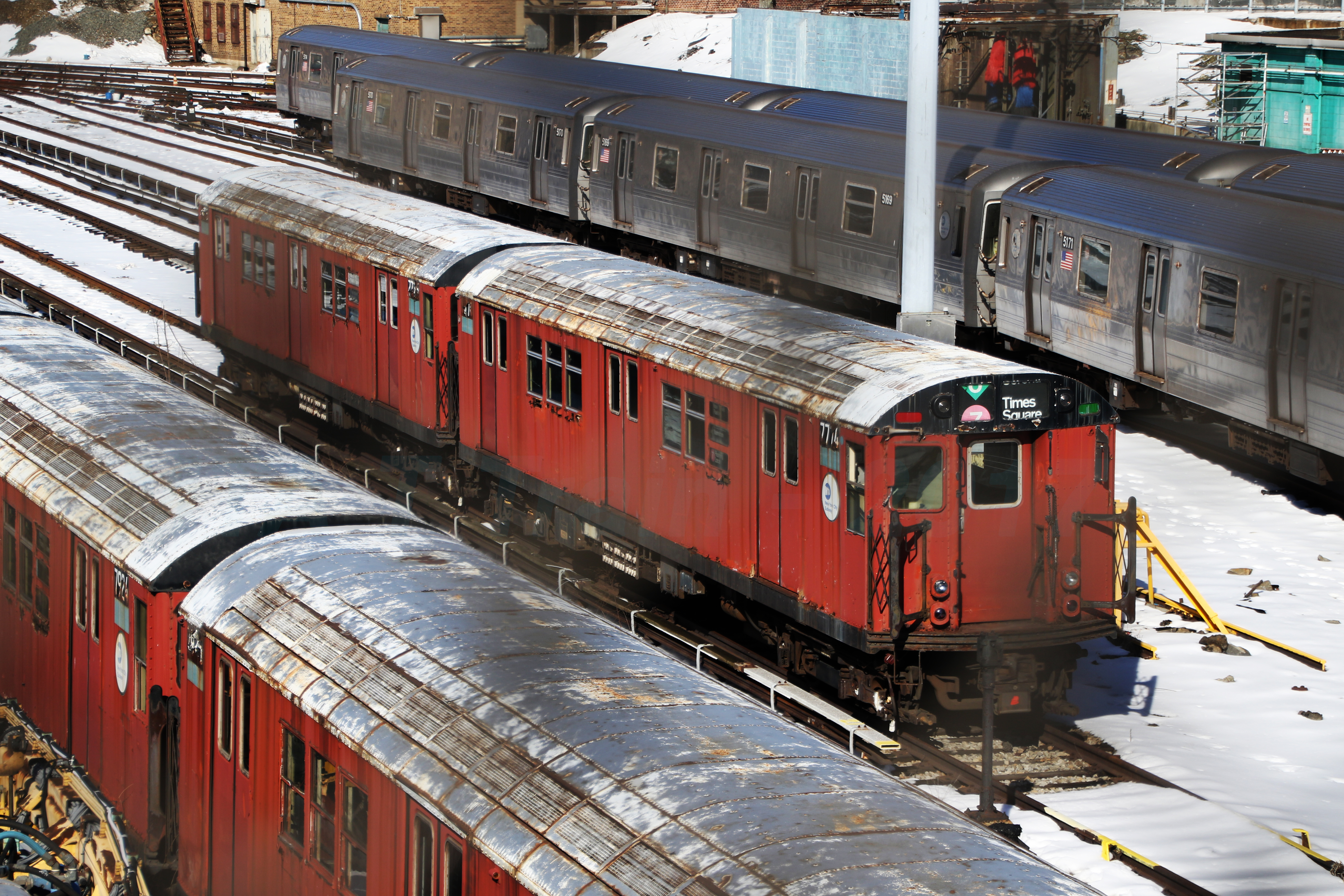
- R26s 7774 and 7775 at Concourse Yard
- In service: October 12, 1959 – October 7, 2002 (42 years)
- Manufacturer: American Car and Foundry
- Family name: Redbirds
- Replaced: Many Steinway Lo-Vs; All Flivver Lo-Vs; Many Standard Lo-Vs
- Constructed: 1959–1960
- Entered service: October 12, 1959
- Refurbished: 1985–1987 (General Overhaul program); 1991 (SMS program (H2C coupler to link bar replacement at B ends))
- Scrapped: 2001–2003
- Number built: 110
- Number preserved: 2
- Number scrapped: 108
- Successor: R142 and R142A
- Formation: Semi-Married Pairs
- Fleet numbers: 7750–7859
- Capacity: 44 (seated)
- Operator: New York City Subway

Specifications
- Car body construction: LAHT carbon steel
- Car length: 51.04 ft (15.56 m)
- Width: 8.75 ft (2,667 mm)
- Height: 11.86 ft (3,615 mm)
- Doors: 6 sets of 50 inch wide side doors per car
- Maximum speed: 55 mph (89 km/h)
- Weight: 70,000 lb (32,000 kg) (post-rebuild)
- Traction system: General Electric 17KG192B1 (7804–7859 formerly Westinghouse)
- Traction motors: General Electric 1257F1 or Westinghouse 1447J
- Power output: 115 hp (86 kW)
- Electric system: 600 V DC Third rail
- Current collection: Contact shoe
- Braking systems: WABCO, "SMEE" (electrodynamic)
- Coupling system: H2C
- Track gauge: 4 ft 8 1/2 in (1,435 mm) standard gauge

The R26 was a New York City Subway car model built by American Car and Foundry from 1959 to 1960 for the IRT A Division. A total of 110 cars were built, arranged in married pairs.

The R26s entered service on October 12, 1959, and received air conditioning by 1982. The fleet was rebuilt by Morrison–Knudsen between 1985 and 1987. The R26s were replaced in 2001 and 2002 with the delivery of the R142 and R142A cars, with the last train running on October 7, 2002. After being retired, most R26s were sunk into the ocean as artificial reefs, but two cars have survived.

== Description ==
The R26s were numbered 7750–7859. They were the first cars not to be built with operating cabs at both ends.

The even-numbered car carried the motor generator and battery set for electrical equipment, while the odd-numbered car held air compressor for the brakes. A special version of the H2C coupler was used to link the cars, so they could easily be split if needed, and thus, they were called "semi-permanent pairs". The No.1 ends of the cars have operator controls, but the No.2 ends only have conductor controls. Although referred to as the "blind end", these ends did have windows for the conductor.

The R26s were the first cars to use single, sealed storm windows since the R14s, and pink colored-molded hard fiberglass seats. The hard fiberglass seats would become standard seating from this order onward for all new cars purchased to cut down on vandalism, reduce maintenance costs, etc.

The R26s wore several paint schemes during their service lives. The cars were delivered in a dark olive green paint scheme similar to the R21s and R22s. In 1970–1975, the R26s were repainted into the MTA corporate silver and blue scheme. In 1982–1983, the R26s were repainted full white (roof, bonnets, and sides were all painted white) in an attempt to combat graffiti. During rebuilding by Morrison–Knudsen at Hornell, New York, from 1985 to 1987, the R26s were repainted into Redbirds with a deep maroon red body, black front bonnets and anti-climbers, and a silver roof.

== History ==
=== Early history ===
The first set of R26s was delivered in July 1959 and placed in service on the 6 train on October 12, 1959. By early 1960, all cars have been delivered. Since delivered, the R26s have been assigned exclusively to the 6 until February 16, 1966, when all of the GE cars were moved to the 2, 4, and 5.

=== Late 1970s–Mid 1980s ===
The R26s were removed from the 4 in October 1976, and the GE cars were assigned to the 2 and 5. The Westinghouse R26s were assigned exclusively to the 6, except from June 23, 1980, to August 1981, when cars 7844–7845 and 7858 (mated to R28 7861) were assigned to the 7.

In January 1983, the R26s were removed from the 5, and the GE cars were assigned exclusively to the 2. From May to June 1983, Westinghouse R26s 7844–7845 were returned to the 7 to fill in for the R33Ss and "World's Fair" R36s while they were being rebuilt. On September 30, 1983, the Westinghouse cars made a second return to the 7 with cars 7804–7823 being assigned there to fill in for the R33Ss and "World's Fair" R36s while they were being rebuilt. On November 18, 1983, Westinghouse R26s 7814–7823 returned from the 7 to the 6, followed by 7804–7813 in February 1984.

=== Rebuilding ===
By 1982, all cars in this series had received air conditioning as part of a retrofitting program to replace their original Axiflow ceiling fans.

The R26s were rebuilt by Morrison–Knudsen in Hornell, New York between 1985 and 1987, and were repainted as Redbirds. All Westinghouse cars were refitted with GE equipment.

Before they were rebuilt, the R26 cars were grouped as follows:

- Cars 7750–7803 had General Electric electrical equipment
- Cars 7804–7859 had Westinghouse electrical equipment

Beginning in Summer 1985, the first un-rebuilt General Electric R26s were removed from service for rebuilding. By Summer 1986, the last un-rebuilt GE R26s were removed from the 2 service. The first Westinghouse cars were sent to be rebuilt in March 1986, and by December 1986, the last R26s were removed from service on the 6 to be sent out for rebuilding. The first rebuilt R26s entered service on the 2 on January 13, 1986. By March 19, 1987, all rebuilt cars were in service.

After rebuilding, all R26s were assigned exclusively to the 2 until May 1995, when all cars were moved to the 5 to improve fleet reliability.

The R26s retained their original H2C couplers on both ends until 1991, when the new Scheduled Maintenance System (SMS) program began. During this time, the R26s were mated numerically and the original H2C couplers on the ends with conductor's controls were replaced with link bars. Prior to 1991, the R26s were often not numerically paired and could also be paired to R28s.

=== Retirement ===
In April 1997, the MTA awarded contracts to Bombardier and Kawasaki for the delivery and purchase of new subway cars (the R142 and R142A) in order to retire the R26s, as well as the other A Division Redbird trains. In June 2001, Delaware agreed to acquire 400 cars being retired amongst the A Division Redbird fleet, including the R26s, to create artificial reefs 16 miles off the coast of the state. The fleet began being withdrawn from service in July, with the first cars being reefed in August. The last four cars on the active roster (numbered 7818–7819 and 7846–7847) made their last trip on the 5 on October 7, 2002, along with the R28 fleet.

In 2002, cars 7770–7771 became school cars at Canarsie Yard. This pair was moved to East New York Yard in September 2006 and continued as school cars there. Then, the pair was moved to 207th Street Yard during the weekend of March 21–22, 2009, in preparation for reefing. The pair was finally reefed on September 6, 2009.

Today, cars 7774–7775 are currently the only surviving R26s. This pair was previously stored at the Unionport Yard until July 2013, when they were moved to the Concourse Yard, along with R28s 7924–7925 and R29s 8678–8679.
