= List of New York City Subway yards =

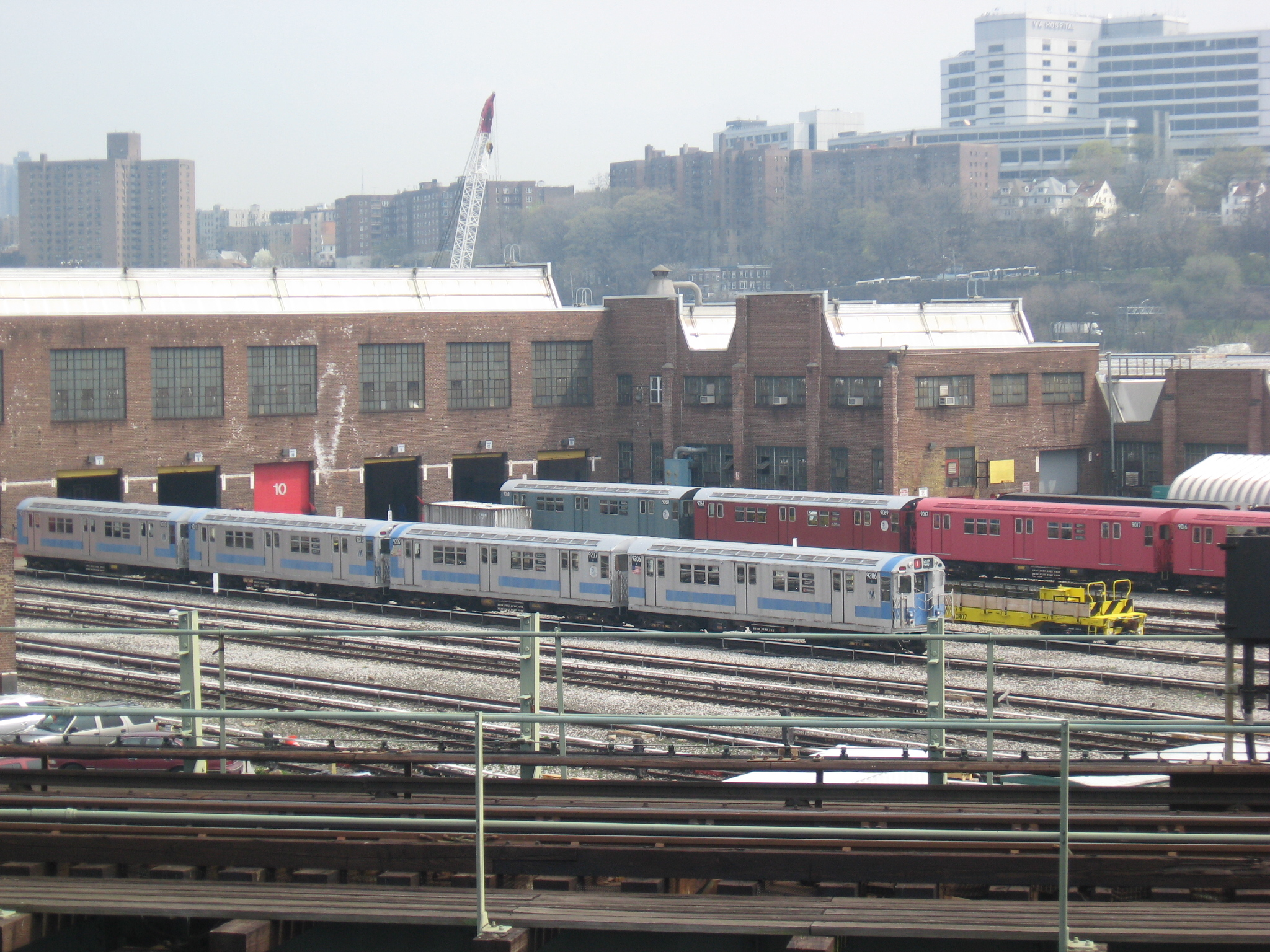
Train of Many Colors storage at 207th Street Yard

The New York City Transit Authority operates 24 rail yards for the New York City Subway system and one for the Staten Island Railway. There are 10 active A Division yards and 11 active B Division yards, two of which are shared between divisions for storage and car washing. In addition, there is one yard for the Staten Island Railway and three non-revenue (Maintenance of Way, or MoW) Division-independent yards. Many of the system's yards are used for off-peak storage, whereas some have inspection facilities where basic routine maintenance is carried out. Of these yards, rolling stock are assigned to seven A Division yards and seven B Division yards. Within the yards are 14 maintenance facilities, whereas two yards (207th Street and Coney Island) perform major overhaul and car rebuilding work.

== A Division yards ==
The A Division's rail yards consist of the 239th Street, 240th Street, Corona, East 180th Street, Jerome, Livonia, and Westchester maintenance yards, plus three other non-maintenance storage yards. A total of 2,892 cars are assigned to the seven maintenance yards.

Cars in the A Division may be stored in B Division yards if necessary.

=== 137th Street Yard ===
The 137th Street Yard is an underground storage yard located between 145th Street and 137th Street–City College on the IRT Broadway–Seventh Avenue Line, the latter of which is the yard's namesake. The yard has five tracks surrounding the three mainline tracks, with three tracks located on the west (southbound side) and two tracks located on the east (northbound side). The yard is used to store some 1 trains outside of rush hours. Each track can hold two full-length trains, so a total of ten trains can be stored there at any given time. Because the tracks are on a 1% downgrade in the southbound direction, each of the layup tracks are equipped with a derail to protect the main line from a runaway train in the event a train placed on any one the storage tracks is not properly secured.

40°49′22″N 73°57′11″W

=== 239th Street Yard ===
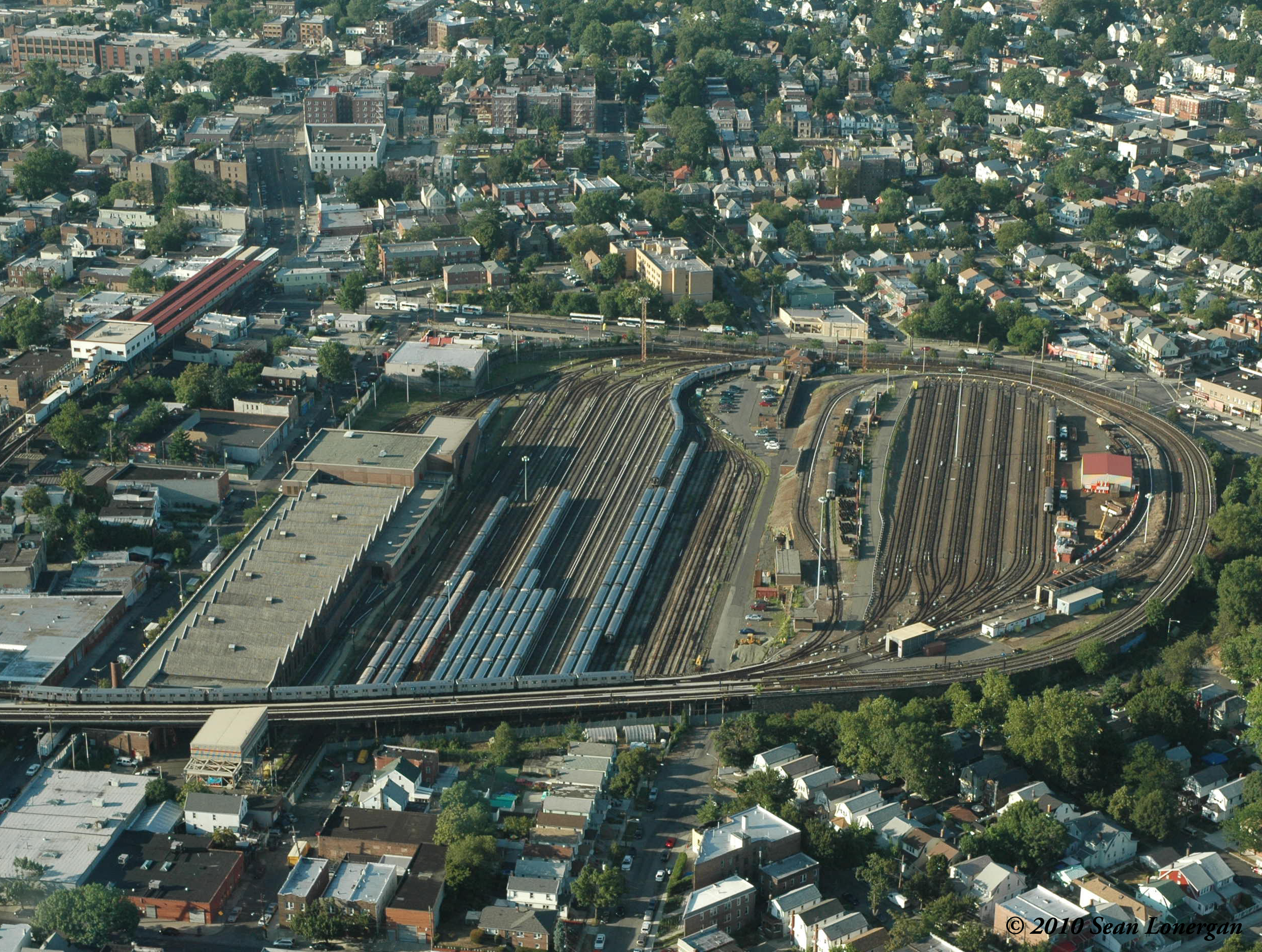
239th Street Yard aerial view

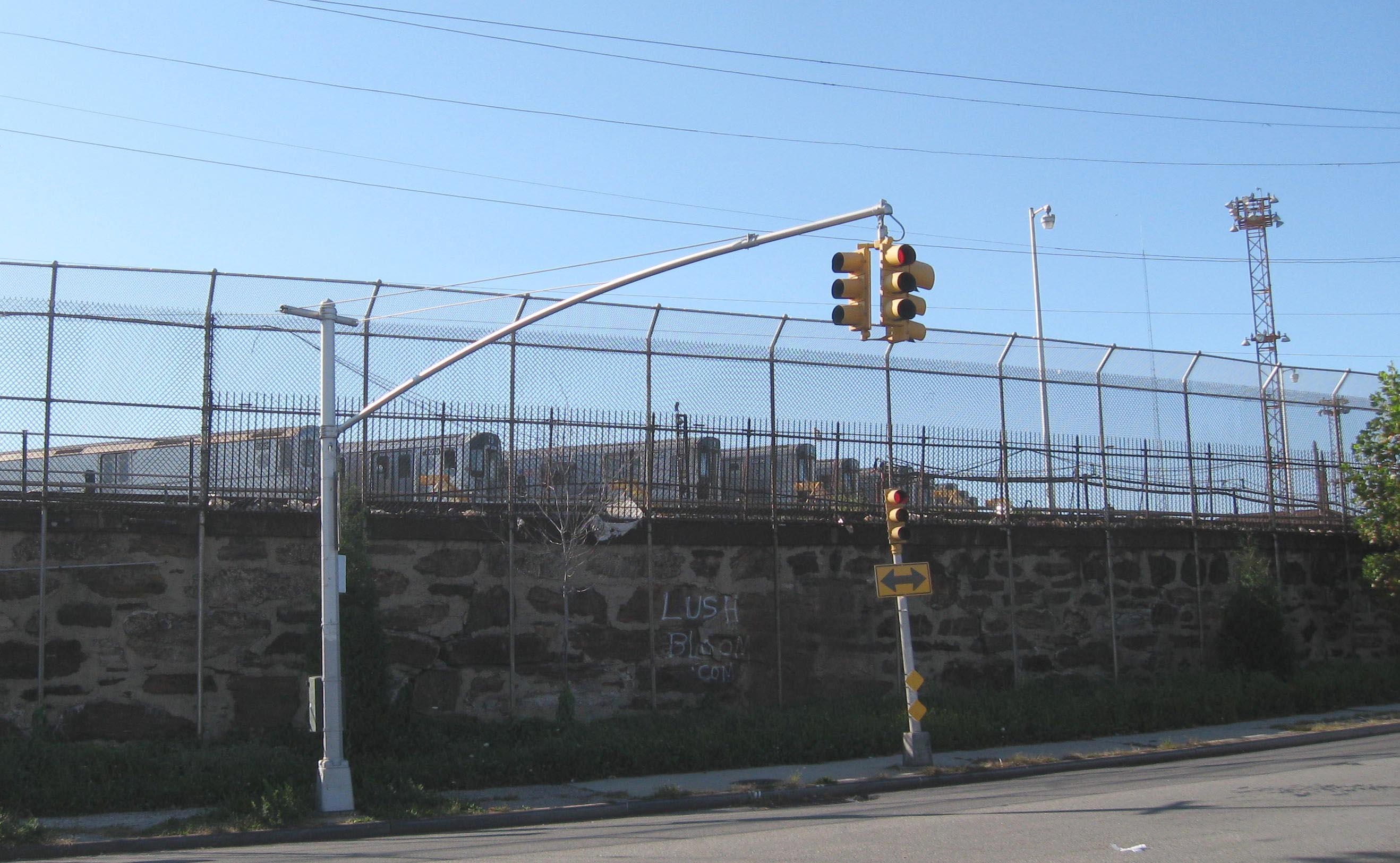
239th Street Yard east side

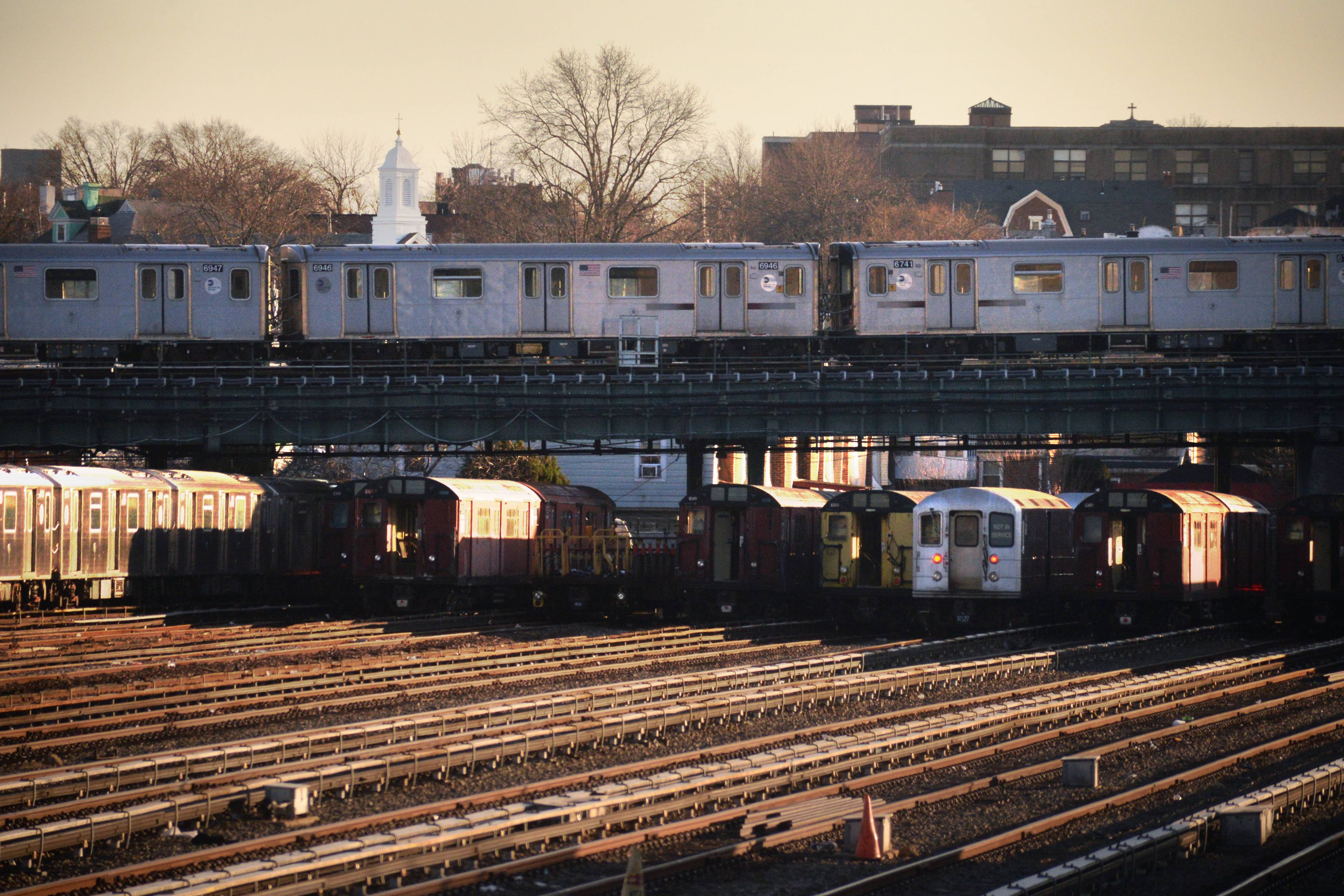
An R142 heading into the 239th St Yard, above several Redbirds and an R127/R134.

The 239th Street Yard is the northernmost rail yard in the system, located at 4570 Furman Avenue in the Wakefield section of the North Bronx, and is home to the R142s assigned to the 2. There is also considerable fleet interoperability with the 5, as 5 trains are based out of the nearby East 180th Street Yard and share a similarly sized fleet. 5 trains use the upper portion of the yard for off-peak storage. Opened in 1916, it is one of the oldest yards in the system.

Ten cars are inspected each day as part of preventative scheduled maintenance. A wheel truing machine was installed here to minimize damage to rail cars and tracks caused by flat wheels. This shop was also used as a facility to retrofit all R26s, R28s, R29s, R33s (except single unit Worlds Fair cars) and R36s (both Mainline and Worlds Fair types) married pairs IRT type cars with the installation of new Stone-Safety 10 ton Air Conditioning systems between 1976 and 1981. Also, during this period, all cars assigned to the 2 were inspected and maintained at the East 180th Street Yard shared with the 5. It re-opened as an inspection and maintenance facility for the 2 in 1982. A car wash operates at this yard facility to serve cars assigned to the 2, in addition to cars assigned to the 1, 3, 4 and 5 routes.

The yard consists of a seven-track inspection shop and 38 layup tracks. The layup tracks are arranged on two levels; the only other yard in the system to share this trait is the East New York Yard. Access to the yard is provided to and from Nereid Avenue only.

On February 3, 1998, two out-of-service trains collided at the yard lead after the motorman of one train passed out at the helm and his train crashed into the one in front of it.

40°54′03″N 73°50′58″W

=== 240th Street Yard ===
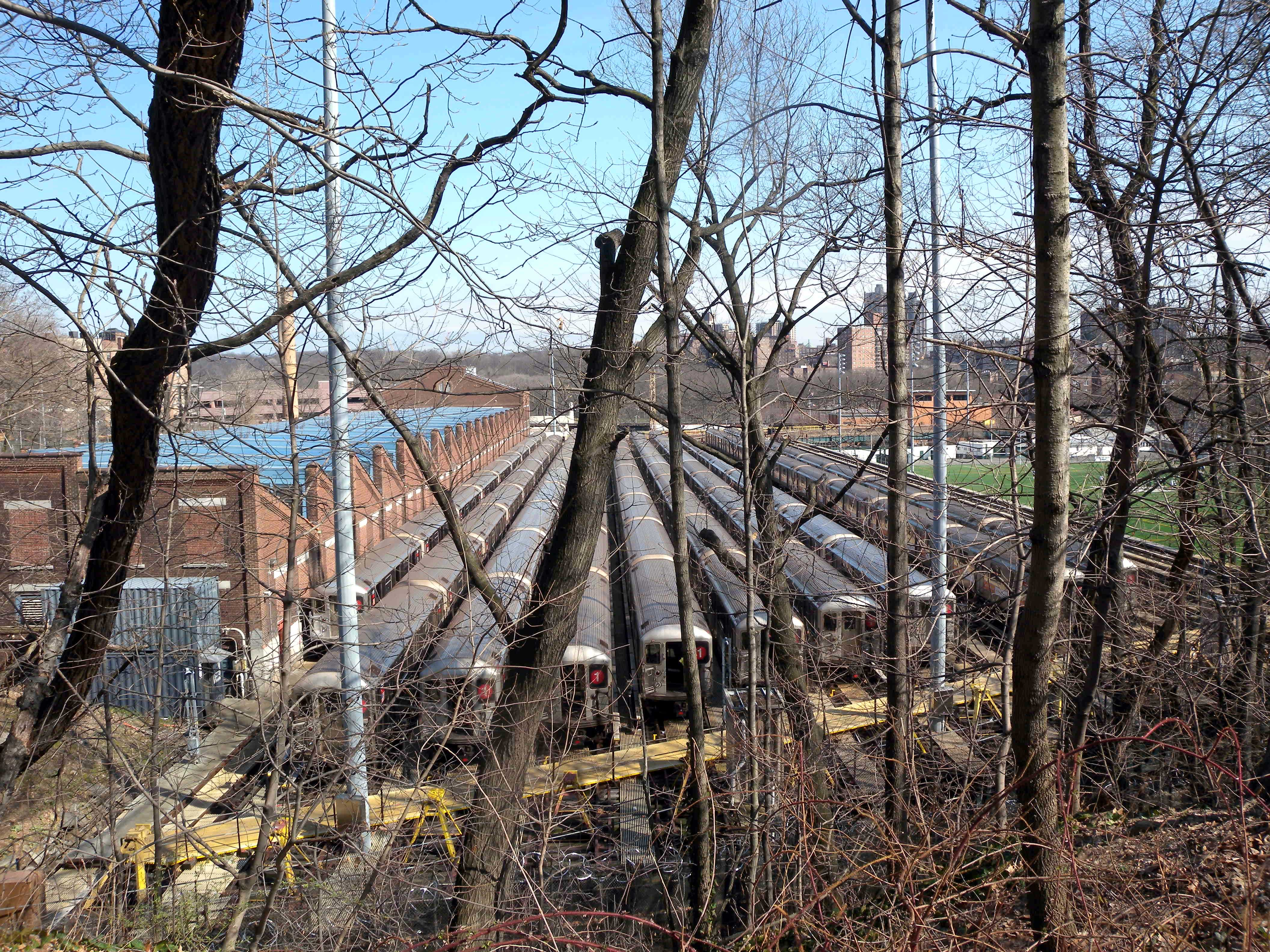
240th Street Yard layup tracks

The 240th Street Yard is located at 5911 Broadway in the Riverdale section of the Bronx, serving the IRT Broadway–Seventh Avenue Line near the line's northern terminus. The yard consists of six inspection tracks in the shop and 15 additional layup tracks. The yard is home to the R62A subway cars assigned to the 1. The shop was built in 1906 to support the original IRT subway. Work constructing the yard and inspection shed was 60 percent complete in June 1910, and was estimated to be completed by January 1, 1911. The inspection shed went into service on May 1, 1911.

The yard and shops are entirely on an elevated structure. There is no car washer at this yard; trains usually go to be washed at the nearby 207th Street Yard and occasionally to the 239th Street or Westchester Yard. Ten cars undergo 10,000 mile SMS inspections per day, since their entire fleet has been unitized into five-car sets.

As part of the 2020–2024 Capital Plan, the shop will be rebuilt with more space in between track and the replacement of pits with elevated tracks.

40°53′18″N 73°54′05″W

=== Corona Yard ===
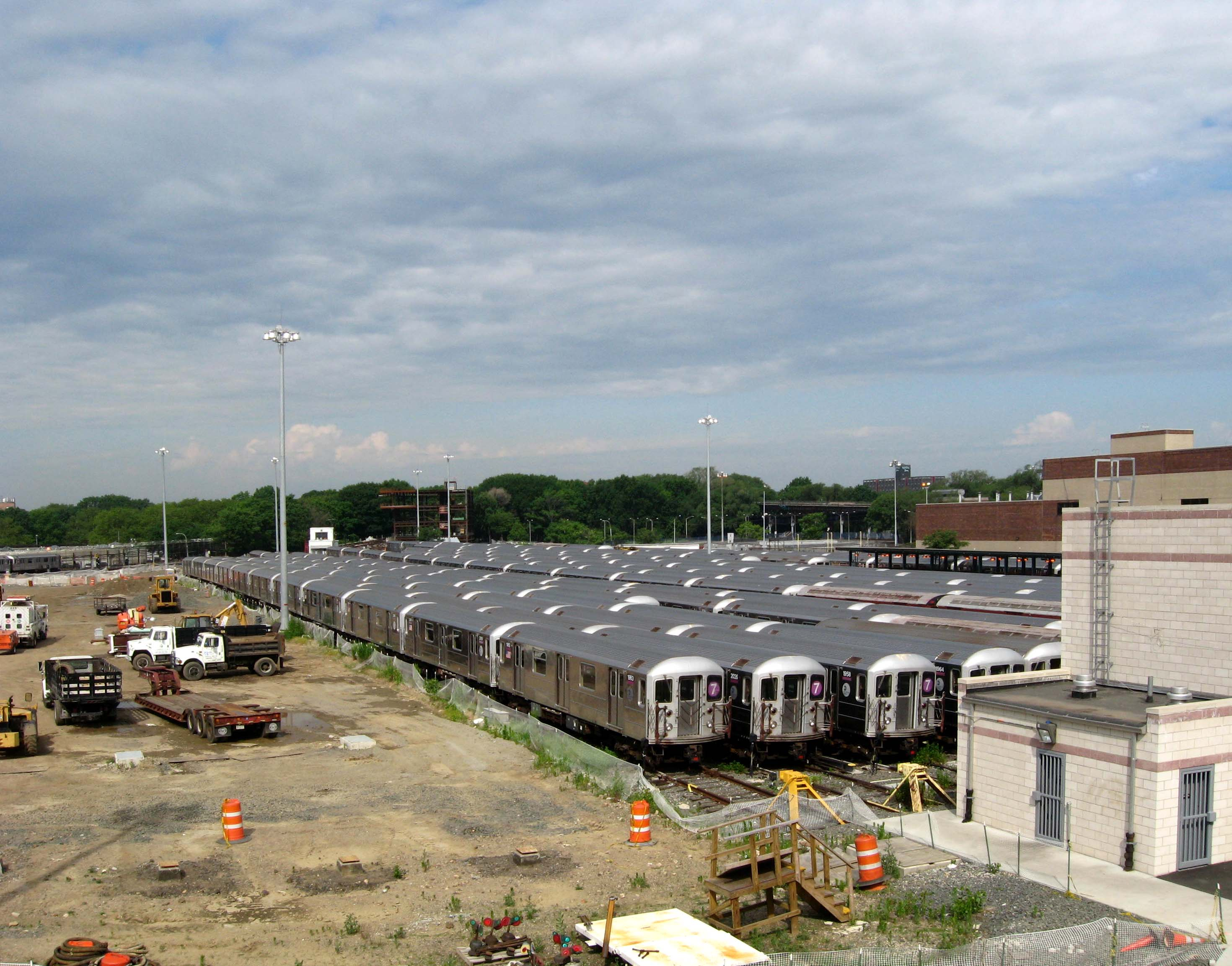
Corona Yard and shop

Corona Yard serves as the home yard of the IRT Flushing Line (7 and <7> trains). It is located south of Mets–Willets Point, at Flushing Meadows–Corona Park near Citi Field, the National Tennis Center, and the site of the 1939 and 1964 World's Fairs.

Corona Yard opened in 1928 and maintains the R188s used on the 7 and <7> services. It is adjacent to the Casey Stengel Bus Depot. Because the Flushing Line is isolated from the rest of the A Division and its only track connection to the rest of the system is via the B Division, cars that need to undergo or are returning from heavy maintenance are escorted on and off the line by suitably-equipped lead cars via the sole connection to the rest of the system just east (railroad north) of the upper level Queensboro Plaza station.

On August 16, 2006, the original 1928 shop building was demolished and replaced by a new, modern shop. With more track mileage to cover and tighter spacing between trains as part of CBTC implementation on the Flushing Line, the MTA announced plans to expand the yard with a second loop and six layup tracks, which would be located on the former right of way of the Long Island Rail Road's Whitestone Branch. Plans for this expansion are on an indefinite hold, however.

40°45′10″N 73°50′46″W

=== East 180th Street Yard ===
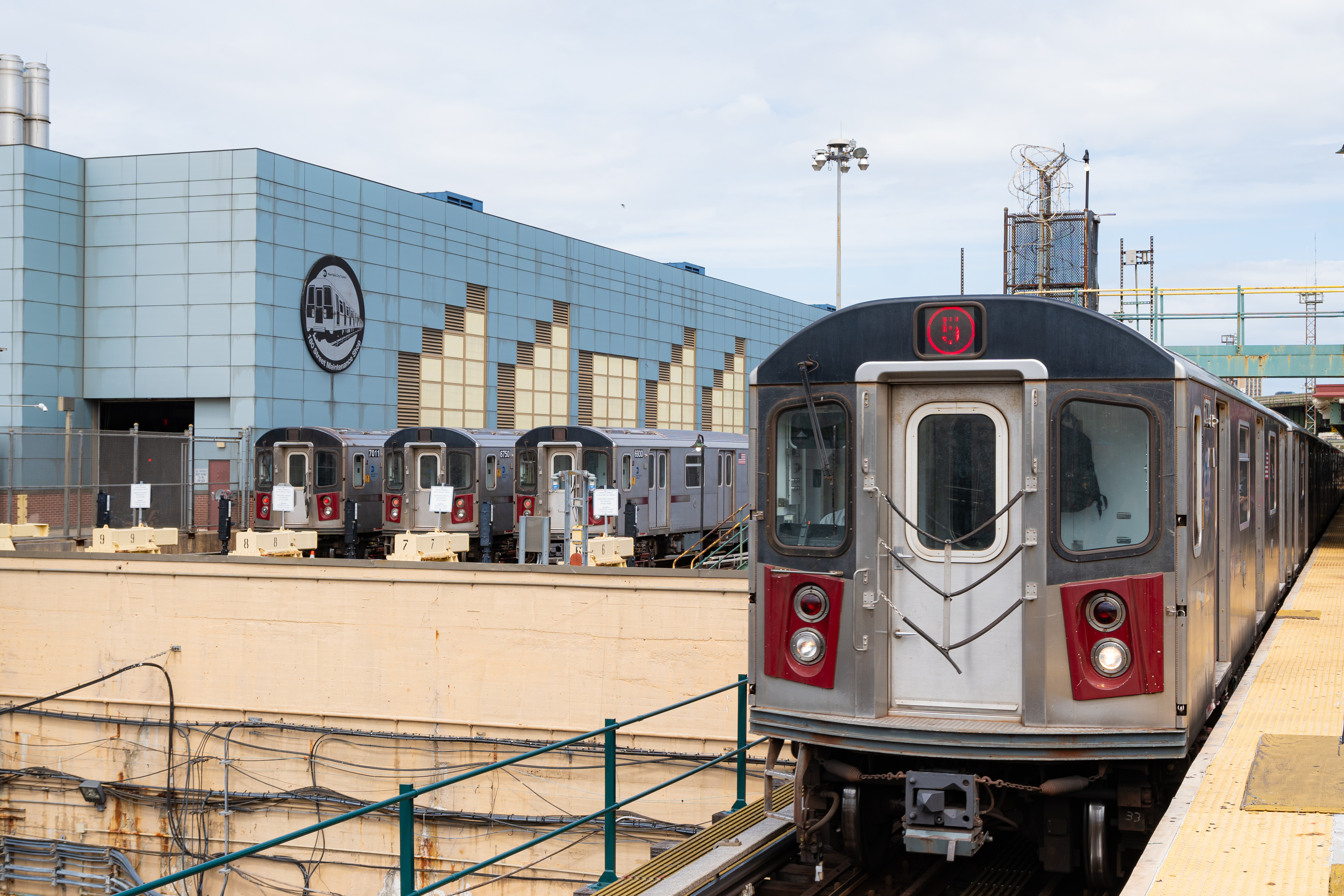
The East 180th Street Yard and Maintenance–Repair Shop; viewed from East 180th Street station

The East 180th Street Yard is situated at 1145 East 180th Street in the West Farms neighborhood of the Bronx, just east of the Bronx Zoo. The yard consists of seven storage tracks (numbered 4 thru 10) and an adjacent 6-track (numbered 11 thru 16) shop building with a connection to the nearby 19-track Unionport Yard, which lies to the northeast of East 180th Street Yard. Additionally, there are two storage tracks (identified as A and B) immediately north of the shop building. Track A ends in a bumper block and track B is accessible from the southbound track of the White Plains Road line. The yard is the home of the R142s for the 5. There is considerable fleet interchange with the 2. All engineering acceptance testing for newly delivered IRT-type cars is performed here. A new shop building replacing the original 1918 vintage shop building opened in 1999, just in time for acceptance testing of new R142s, which Bombardier started delivering to this facility on November 16, 1999. On October 11, 1923, additional tracks in the yard went into service.

40°50′33″N 73°52′22″W

=== Jerome Yard ===
The Jerome Yard, or Mosholu Yard, is located at 3191 Jerome Avenue in the Jerome Park neighborhood of the Bronx. The yard was built in 1925. Five tracks went into service in the yard on February 7, 1923.

This yard is home to the R142s and R142As for the 4. It is one of the three yards in the system to be under a housing complex (Pitkin Yard and Lenox Yard are the others). Rail access to the yard is by a pair of tracks that branch off of the elevated IRT Jerome Avenue Line just north of Bedford Park Boulevard–Lehman College station. The riveted steel pylons that support the elevated branch tracks give way to stone pylons just north of 205th Street before they enter the yard. The yard is surrounded by a wall and covered by a parking deck used by residents of the Tracey Towers housing complex. The yard has four inspection tracks, one utility track and 18 layup tracks. Trains are washed at the nearby Concourse Yard.

40°52′44″N 73°53′16″W

=== Lenox Yard ===
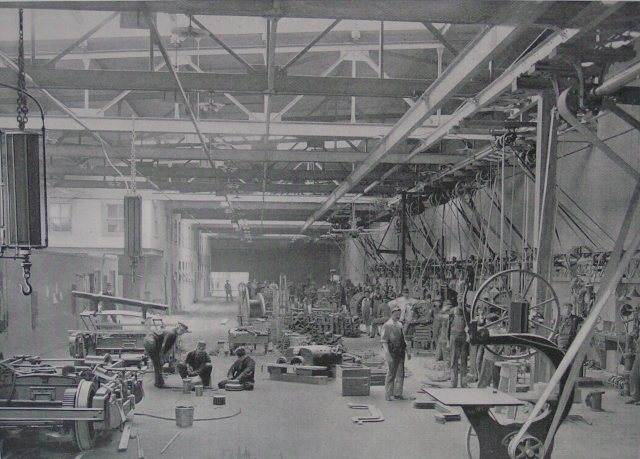
Lenox Yard in 1902

Lenox Yard, formerly the Lenox Avenue Shops, is located near 148th Street and Lenox Avenue in Harlem. This 22 track yard is only used for storage of the R62s that operate on the 3, and has no maintenance facility, although the yard had been the first overhaul shop for the IRT when it opened with the rest of the new subway in 1904. The original IRT subway cars were lowered from the street via inclines into the yard, where they continued into the West Side Main Line. The inspection shed was lengthened to fit ten-car trains in Fiscal Year 1910. On September 9, 1958 the Transit Authority announced that it was planning to abandon the Lenox Avenue Shops. All IRT and IND repairs would then be done at the 207th Street Shops by June 1959. The TA estimated that this would result in a saving of $1 million a year. Formerly extending between 147th and 150th Streets, in the 1960s the yard was downsized from 26 acres to seven acres, which eliminated the repair shops and NYCT offices. The land was sold to a developer. Around that time, a public school building (currently housing Frederick Douglass Academy) and the Esplanade Gardens apartment complex were constructed on pilotis above the formerly open-air yard. Two tracks were taken from the yard for the Harlem–148th Street station, which opened in 1968 as the current northern terminal for the 3.

40°49′22″N 73°56′07″W

=== Livonia Yard ===
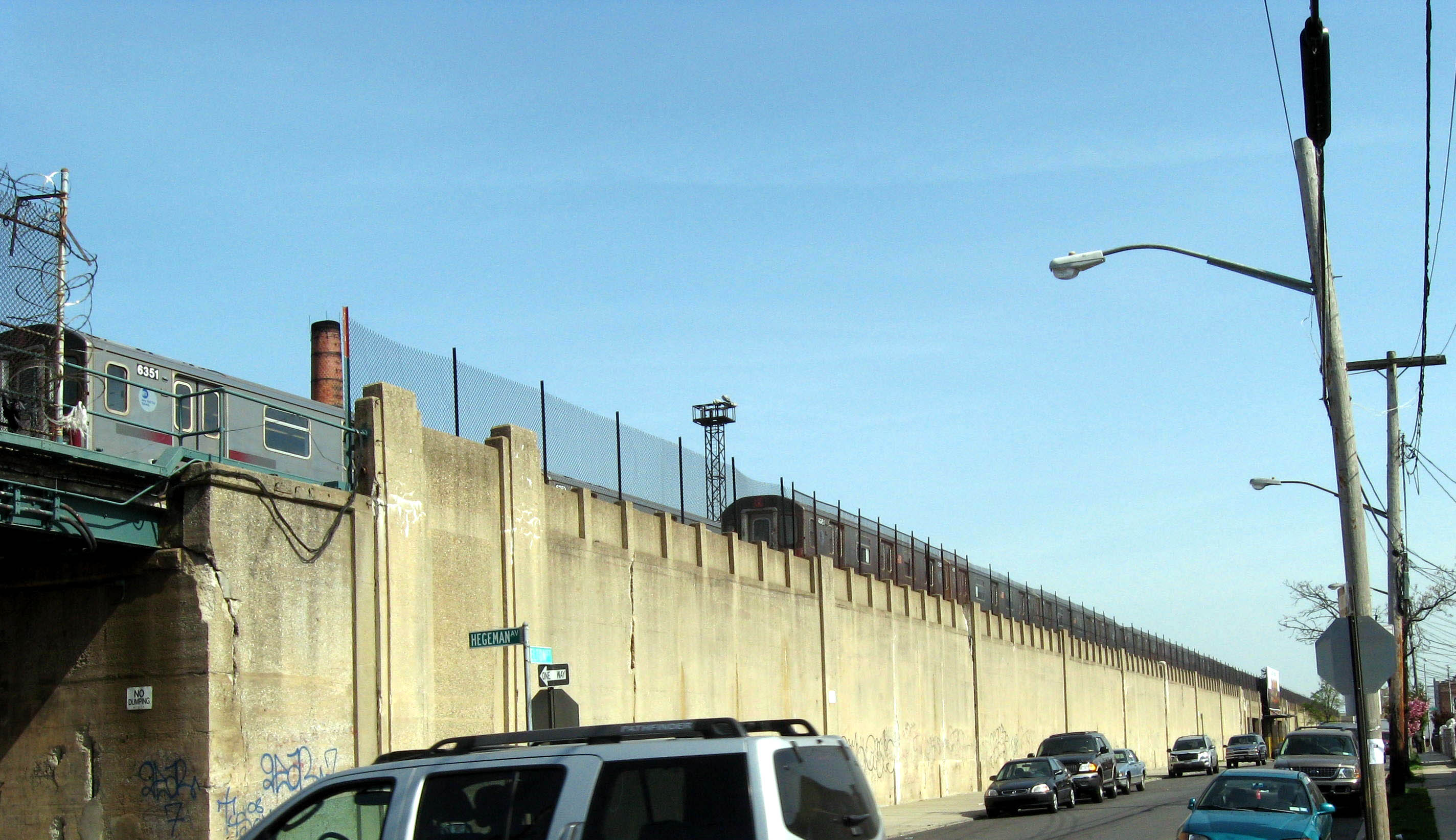
Northwest end of Livonia Yard

The Livonia Yard is located at 900 Hegeman Avenue in East New York, Brooklyn on an entirely elevated structure at the east end of the IRT New Lots Line. Located between Elton and Linwood Streets, the yard extends from Hegeman Avenue south to Stanley Avenue, passing over Linden Boulevard. One of the smallest maintenance yards in the system, it is where the R62s on the 3 and the R62As on the 42nd Street Shuttle are inspected and maintained.

The yard, built in 1922 and opened in 1923, Livonia Yard is the only IRT yard in Brooklyn. Livonia Yard consists of 4 inspection tracks inside the Livonia shop and 15 layup tracks. A signal tower is located at the northwest corner of the yard. Many 3 trains are stored in the Lenox Yard in Upper Manhattan, as Livonia is not very large.

Livonia, along with 240th Street Yard, are on entirely elevated structures and are in need of rehabilitation due to not meeting the configuration standards for "current industry practices". An extension of the New Lots Line has been proposed up to the end of the yard, or through the yard right-of-way to Flatlands Avenue, to serve the developing Spring Creek area.

Additionally, a large amount of space within Livonia is used for the storage of some R142s and R142As for the 2, 4 and 5 trains.

40°39′51″N 73°52′45″W

=== Unionport Yard ===
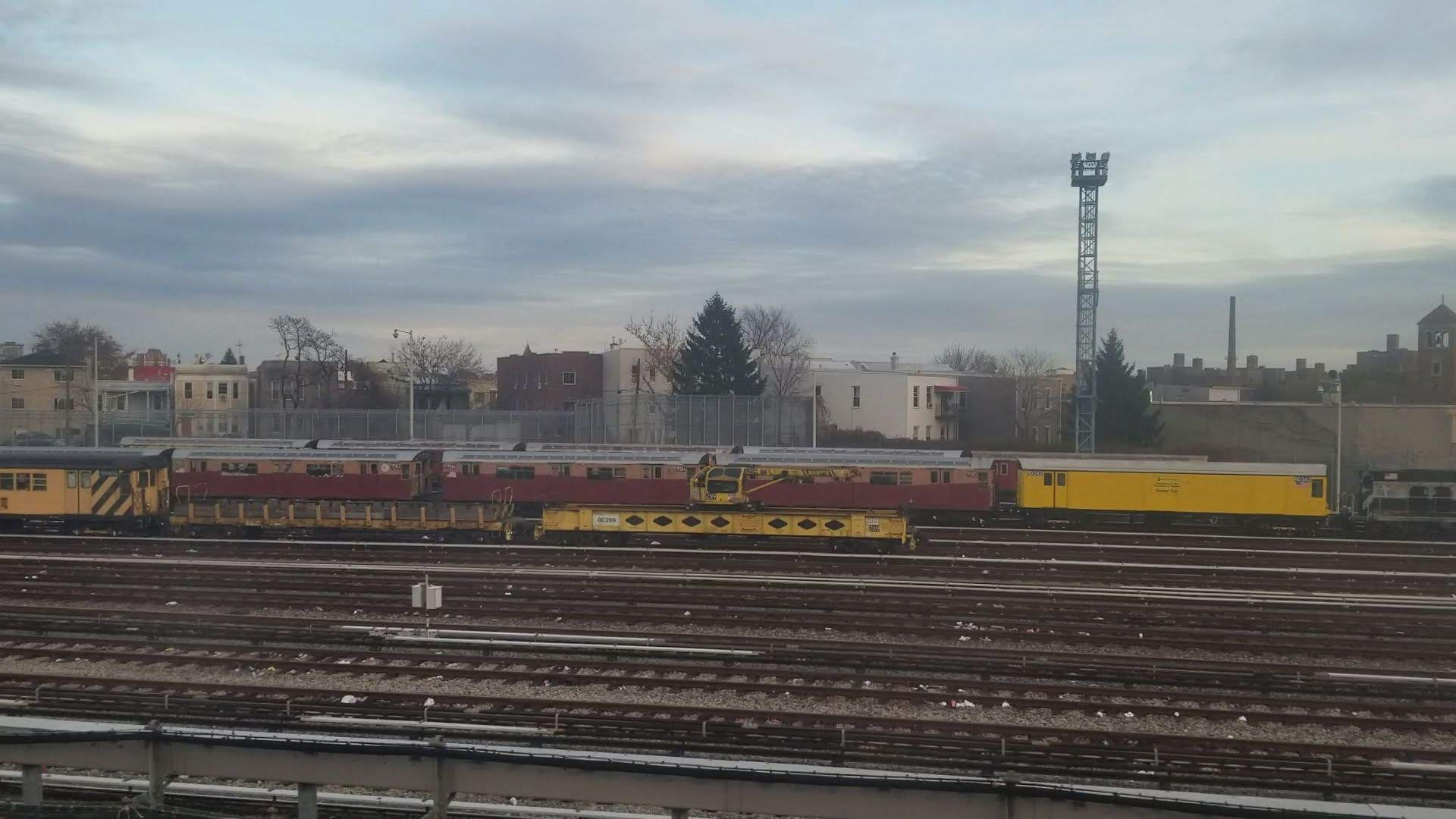
Unionport Yard in 2019.

Unionport Yard is associated with the nearby East 180th Street Yard, and is used primarily as a lay-up facility for 2 and 5 trains. It is named after Unionport Road, which lies just east of the yard. There are no shop or wash facilities at this yard, which was expanded in the 1990s from five tracks to its present 19 (numbered 19 to 37). All but one track ends at bumper blocks. The newly expanded yard became fully operational in 1997. The yard connects to the IRT White Plains Road Line to the south and the IRT Dyre Avenue Line (track 22 connecting to track Y2) to the north.

40°50′42″N 73°52′12″W

=== West Farms Yard ===
The West Farms Yard was an elevated rail yard that was located adjacently to the West Farms Square–East Tremont Avenue station, at the time called 177th Street. It had eight storage tracks and five inspection barn tracks. It was demolished in 1950; the redundant 180th Street–Bronx Park station was closed down and demolished two years later. In addition to serving Manhattan Elevated Railway cars, it was also used to service cars assigned to the 2 and 5 routes.

=== Westchester Yard ===
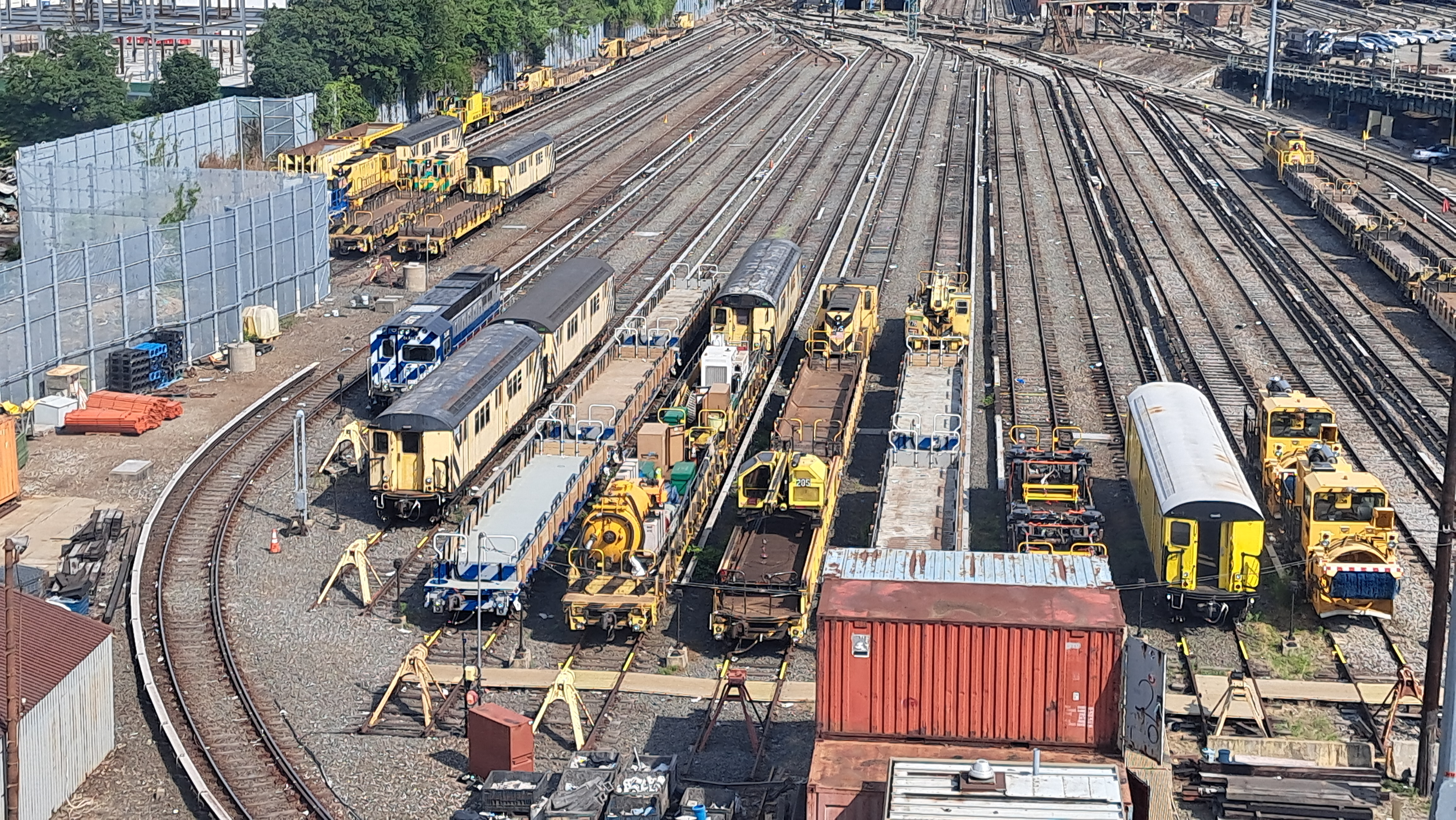
Westchester Yard in 2023

The Westchester Yard, also known as the Pelham Yard, is located at Westchester Avenue and Waters Pl between the Westchester Square and Pelham Bay neighborhoods in the Bronx, and has 45 layup tracks. The yard maintains and stores the R62s and R62As used on the 6, as well as Maintenance of Way diesel trains for both the A Division and B Division. It is connected to the IRT Pelham Line in both directions between Westchester Square–East Tremont Avenue and Middletown Road stations.

There is a four-track inspection shed for electric trains and a two-track diesel repair shop. Pelham Yard also has a car wash used by the entire A Division.

The Westchester Yard was expanded between 1946 and 1949 and the scope of the project included a new signal tower, signal installations, and the elimination of the grade crossings between the yard and the Pelham Line north of the Westchester Square station. All of these projects would allow for sped up main line service and train movements in and out of the yard. The grade separation allowed trains to enter Westchester Yard without crossing the express track or the downtown local track and it allowed for the possibility of the extension of express service to Pelham Bay Park, which would save four more minutes. The increased capacity of the yard allowed the yard to store 358 additional subway cars. With the additional storage space, it would no longer be required to lay up trains on the middle track of the line between East 177th Street and Pelham Bay Park, and it would allow for full day express service. The construction of substations would improve voltage conditions and allow for longer trains to be operated on the line. The work was projected to cost $6,387,000 and be completed in 1950.

40°50′38″N 73°50′31″W

== B Division yards ==
The B Division's yards are the 207th Street, Concourse, Coney Island, East New York, Jamaica and Pitkin maintenance yards, plus five other non-maintenance storage yards. The six maintenance shops are responsible for performing daily subway car maintenance and inspection of 3,523 subway cars.

The 207th Street and Concourse yards are shared with the A Division and are listed in Yards in both divisions.

=== 174th Street Yard ===
The 174th Street Yard is an underground rail yard on the IND Eighth Avenue Line that is used to store C trains. The yard has five tracks to the east of the two mainline passenger service tracks. The yard is located six blocks north of 168th Street and adjacent to 175th Street. The inner tracks at 168th Street lead towards the yard and are used by terminating C trains. This yard can hold only four trains of ten 60-foot cars or eight 75-foot cars and one four-car train of 60-foot cars among the five tracks. The northern end of the yard is against a concrete wall and a cinder-block wall adjacent to the Trans-Manhattan Expressway, as the line was originally intended to go over the George Washington Bridge's lower level as a part of a possible extension to Fort Lee, New Jersey.

40°50′45″N 73°56′23″W

=== Canarsie Yard ===
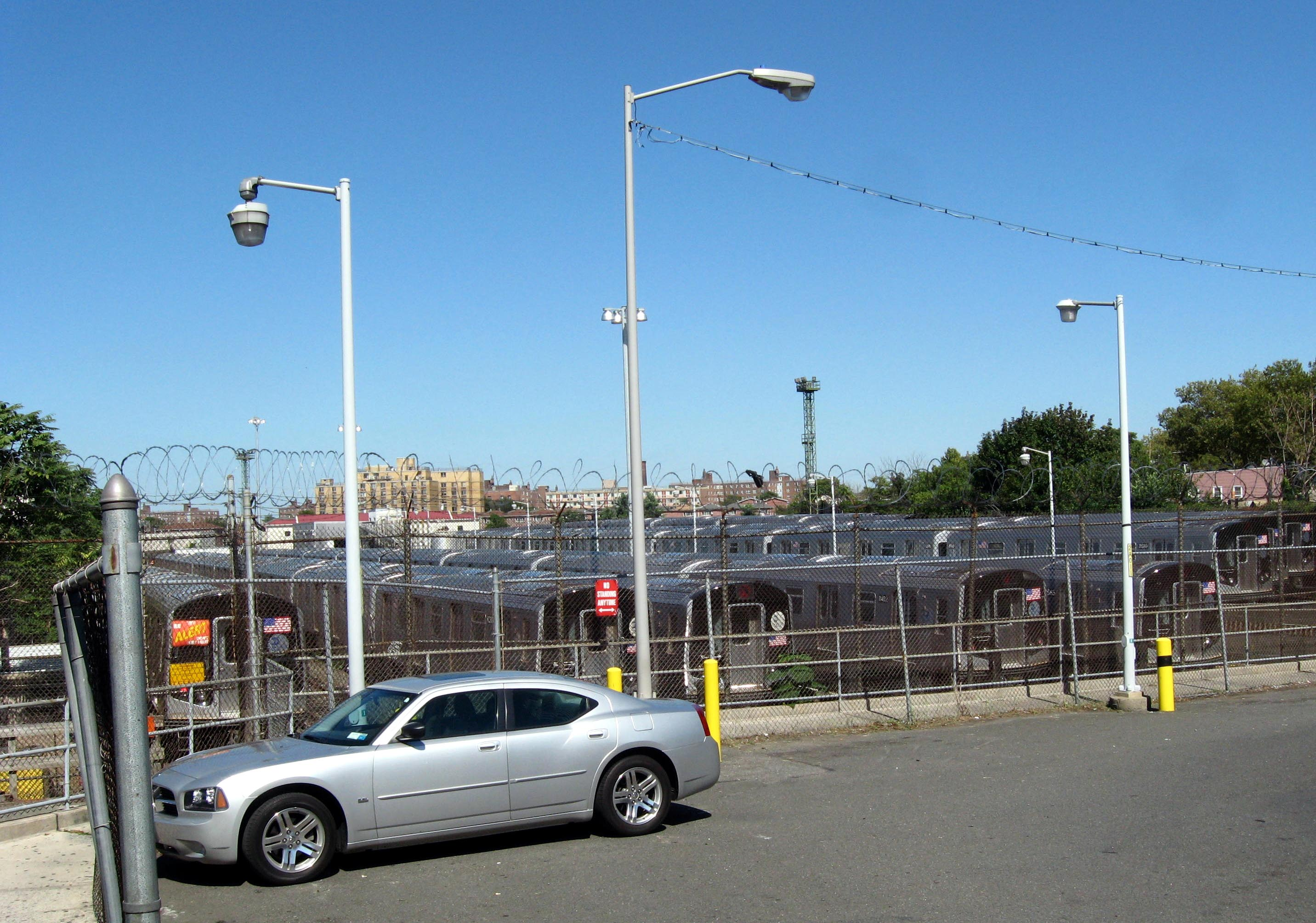
South end of Canarsie Yard

The Canarsie Yard (also known as AY or Atlantic Yard from its telegraphy letters) is located on the south end of the BMT Canarsie Line adjacent to Canarsie–Rockaway Parkway. Opened on October 26, 1917, it is the primary layup yard for the R143s and R160s on the L and hosts the only car wash for the BMT Eastern Division.

New signals were installed in 2003 in conjunction with the BMT Canarsie Line automation project.

40°38′48″N 73°54′05″W

=== Church Avenue Yard ===
The Church Avenue Yard is an underground rail yard on the IND Culver Line that is used to store trains for the G. It is composed of four tracks directly under the four main line tracks above. This yard is directly connected through the line's Church Avenue station which is the southern terminus for G service. At least one of the yard's four tracks is in continuous use to reverse equipment to the opposite direction. There are two ramps between each local and express track south of Church Avenue station for access. Each track can hold one full-length train between the bumper blocks and the crossovers.

40°38′31″N 73°58′45″W

=== Coney Island Complex ===
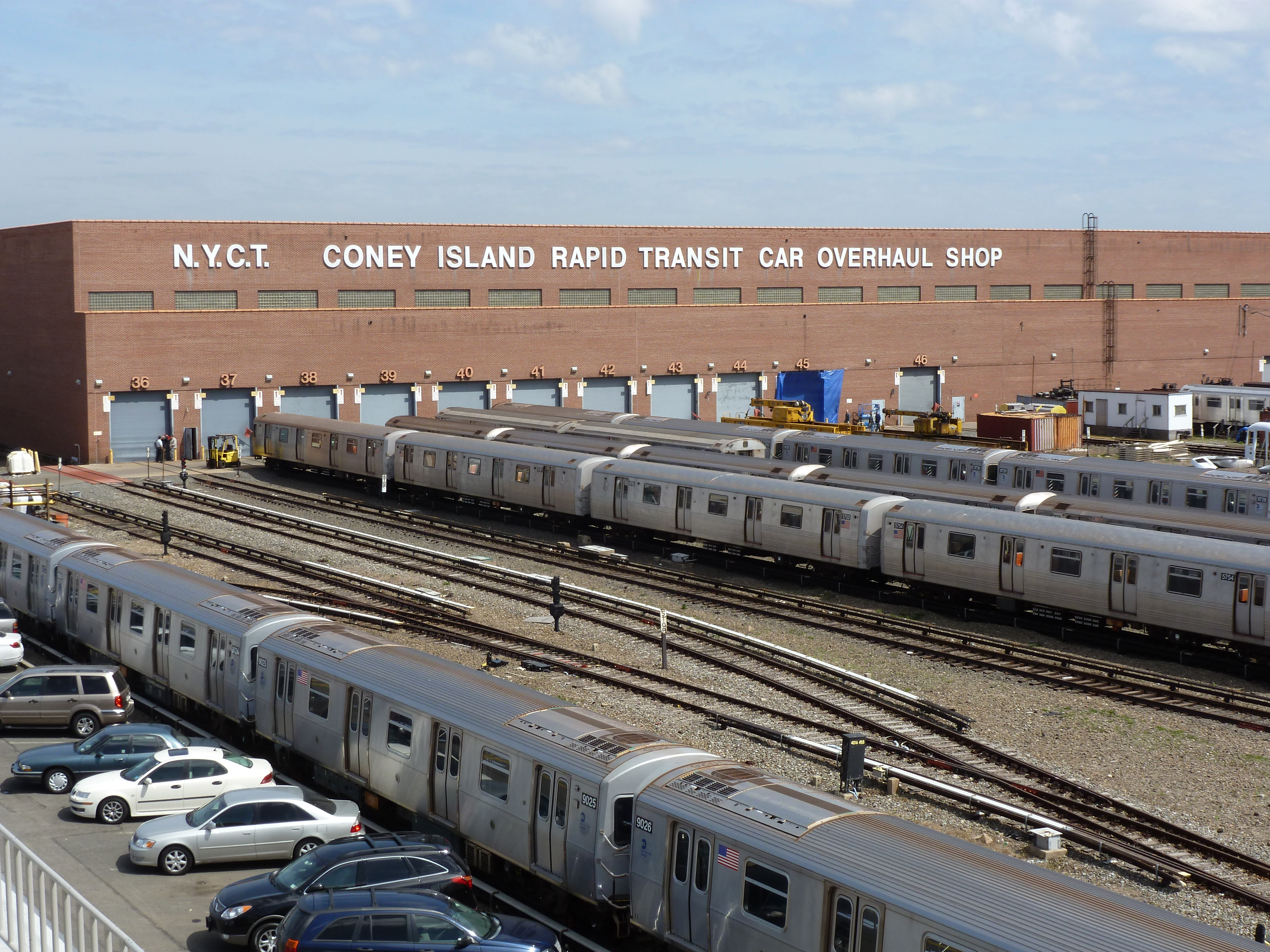
Coney Island Complex

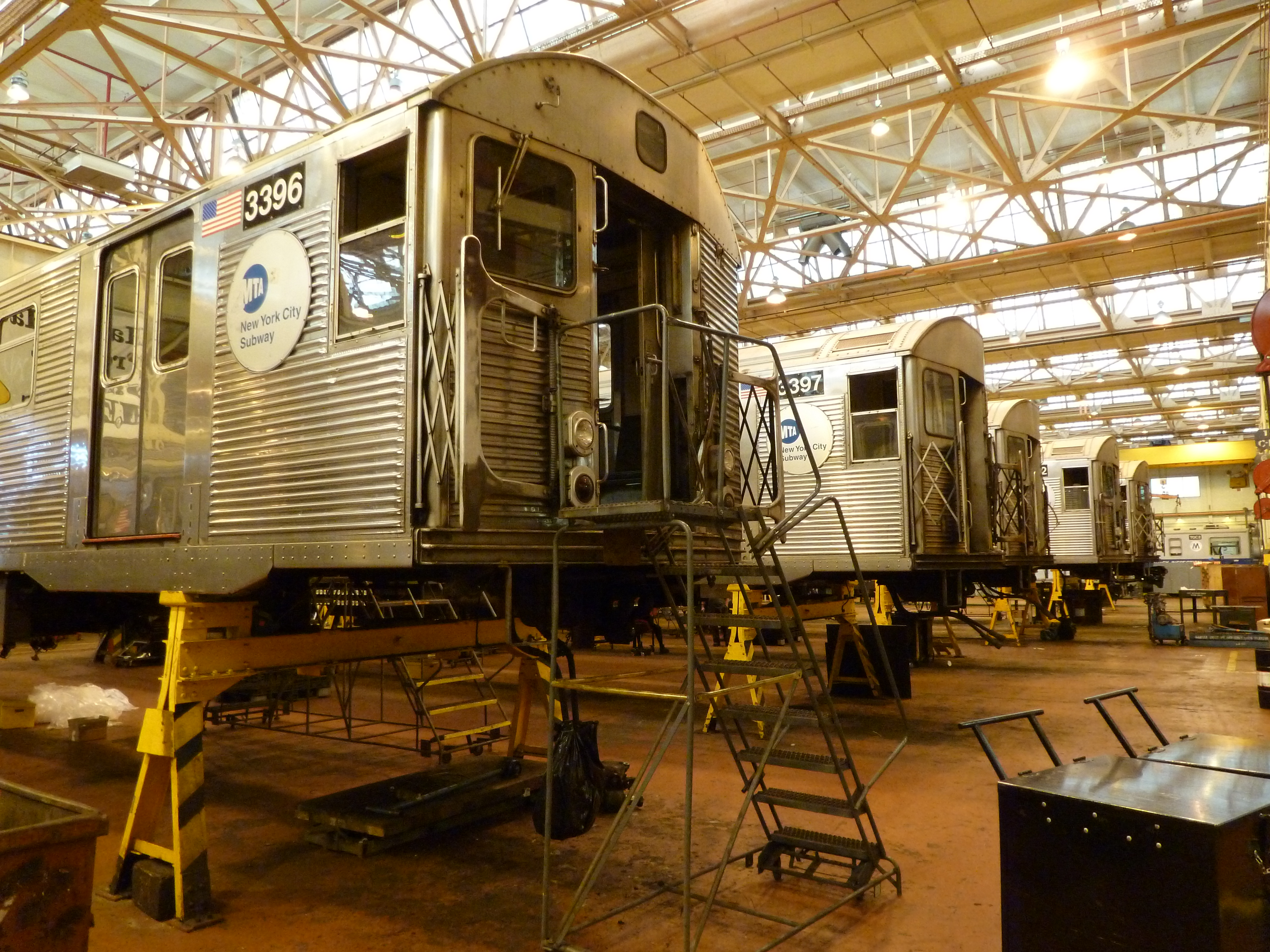
Inside view into a workshop

The Coney Island Rapid Transit Car Overhaul Shop, often shortened to Coney Island Complex, is the largest rapid transit yard in the state of New York, and one of the largest in North America. Located in the Gravesend neighborhood of Brooklyn, New York, it covers 74 acres (300,000 m^{2}) and operates 24/7. The complex was built in 1926 on former marshlands that, along with Coney Island Creek, used to separate Coney Island from the main body of Brooklyn. Much of this land had originally been proposed for use as a ship canal and port facility.

A car washing machine was installed in the yard at the end of 1964.

Regular scheduled maintenance is performed here for a fleet of nearly 800 cars of R46s, R68s, R68As, R211As, and R211Ts serving the B, G, N, Q, W, and Franklin Avenue Shuttle. R68s and R211As on the D, and R160s on the F and R, are stored at the yard but are not maintained or inspected here. The G line's fleet is based here, but operations of the line are in Jamaica Yard. The shop facility, along with the 207th Street Shops, performs inspections, heavy maintenance and overhaul for every one of the approximately 6,000 cars in the subway system, including the Staten Island Railway, and also contains car washing and painting facilities.

In addition to heavy maintenance facilities and track facilities for cars undergoing maintenance and overhaul, the complex includes three related railroad storage yards. The main yard facility, known as Coney Island Yard, includes direct connections to the adjacent BMT Sea Beach Line (N and W trains) and a two-track elevated structure to the BMT West End Line (D, R, and W trains). The main yard also serves trains on the BMT Brighton Line (B and Q trains) via tracks C & D (also known as 3 & 4, respectively) of Coney Island–Stillwell Avenue station. The adjacent but separate Culver Yard (also called City Yard or Avenue X Yard) connects to the IND Culver Line (F and <F> trains) at the eastern border of the yard complex, holding cars for the F service. Another yard, the Stillwell Yard, used mainly for off-peak train storage, is located across the Sea Beach Line from the main yard complex in a wye between the divergent Sea Beach and West End Lines.

In addition to the maintenance shop and yards, there is a Health Center (gym) and medical center for Transit Authority employees, a firing range for the New York City Police Department (NYPD)'s Transit Division, and a firefighting training school. The range was originally built for the New York City Transit Police Department, which was merged with the NYPD in 1995.

The Coney Island Yard Electric Motor Repair Shop and Coney Island Yard Gatehouse were listed on the National Register of Historic Places in 2006.

40°35′10″N 73°58′40″W

==== Gatehouse ====
- Coney Island Yard Gatehouse
- U.S. National Register of Historic Places
- New York State Register of Historic Places
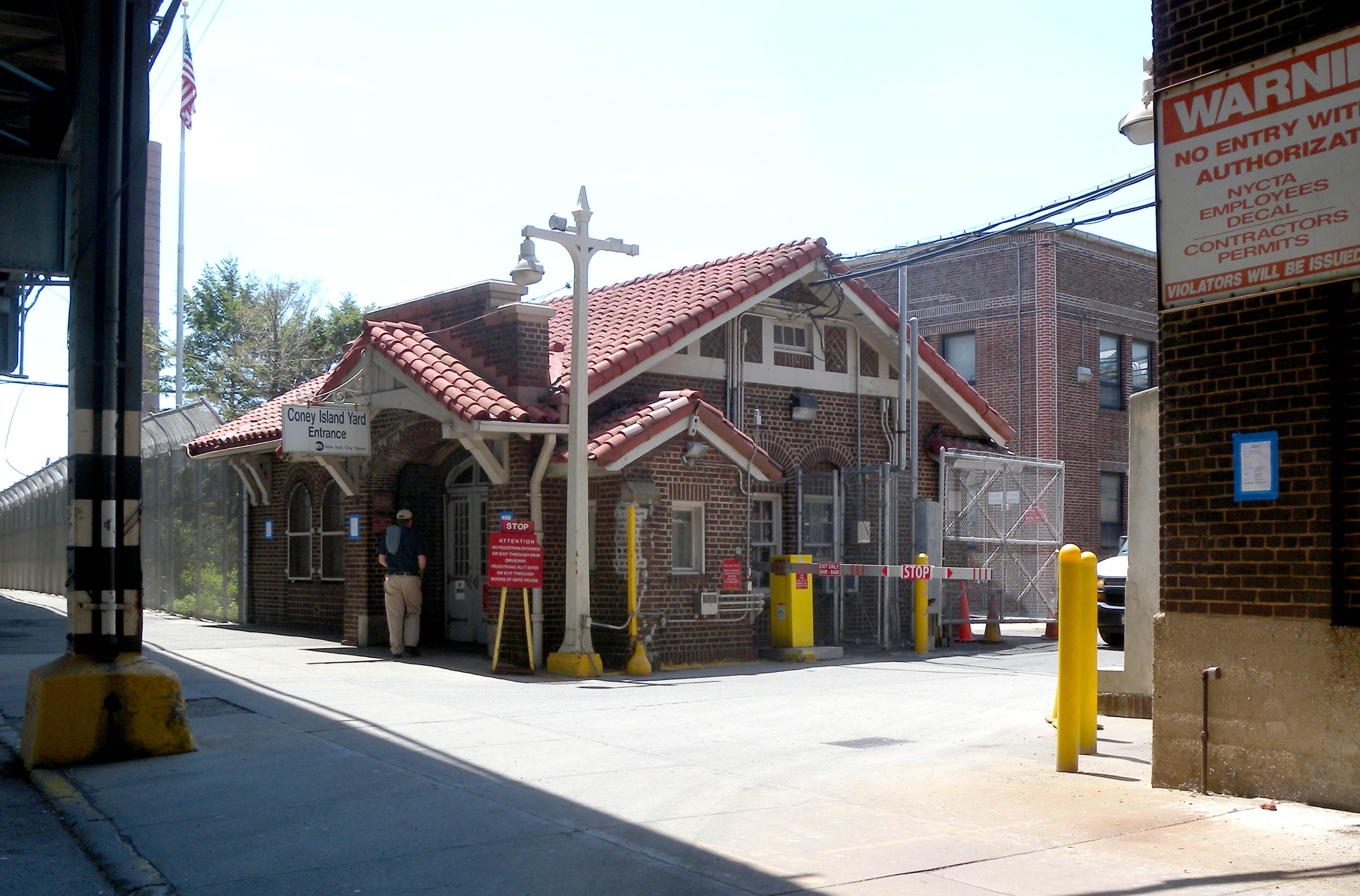
- Coney Island Yard Gatehouse, May 2009

- Location within New York City
- Location: SW corner of Shell Road and Avenue X, Brooklyn, New York
- Coordinates: 40°35′22″N 73°58′28″W
- Area: less than one acre
- Built: 1929
- Architects: Ridgeway, Robert
- Architectural style: Bungalow/Craftsman
- MPS: New York City Subway System MPS
- NRHP reference No.: 06000017
- NYSRHP No.: 04701.013887

Significant dates
- Added to NRHP: February 9, 2006
- Designated NYSRHP: September 19, 2005

Coney Island Yard Gatehouse is a historic gatehouse located at the Coney Island Complex. It was built about 1929 and is a small masonry building with prominent clay tile roof with deep overhanging eaves.

It was listed on the National Register of Historic Places in 2006.

==== Electric Motor Repair Shop ====
- Coney Island Yard Electric Motor Repair Shop
- U.S. National Register of Historic Places
- New York State Register of Historic Places
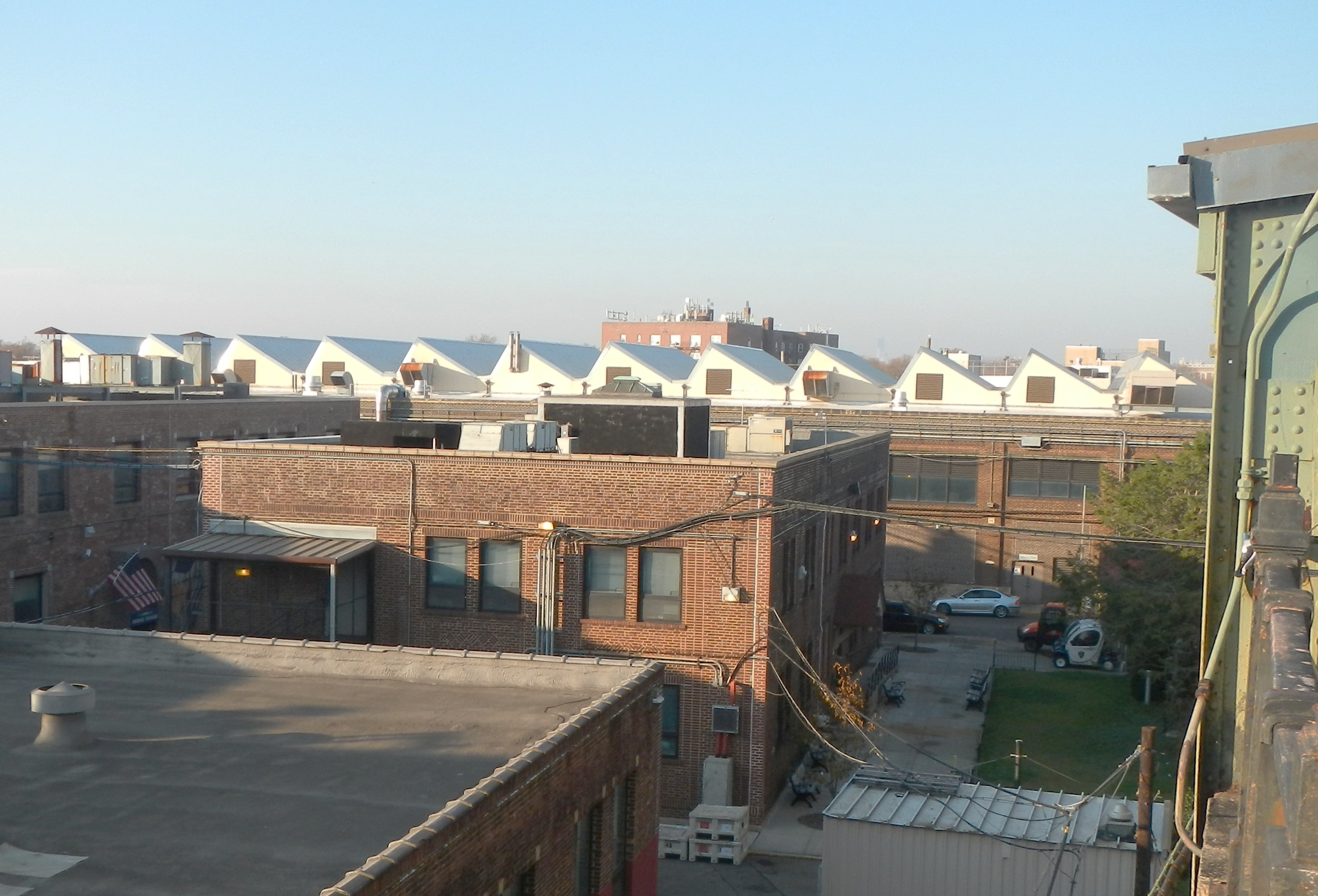
- From Avenue X station

- Location within New York City Location within New York Location within the United States
- Location: SW corner of Avenue X and Shell Road, Brooklyn, New York
- Coordinates: 40°35′23″N 73°58′31″W
- Area: less than one acre
- Built: 1927
- MPS: New York City Subway System MPS
- NRHP reference No.: 06000016
- NYSRHP No.: 04701.013887

Significant dates
- Added to NRHP: February 9, 2006
- Designated NYSRHP: September 19, 2005

The Coney Island Yard Electric Motor Repair Shop is a historic motor repair shop for subway trains located at the Coney Island Complex. It was built between 1925 and 1927 and is a simple two-story, box-shaped brick-clad building lit by multiple banks of large, multi-paned windows and a massive sawtooth skylight.

It was listed on the National Register of Historic Places in 2006.

=== East New York Yard ===
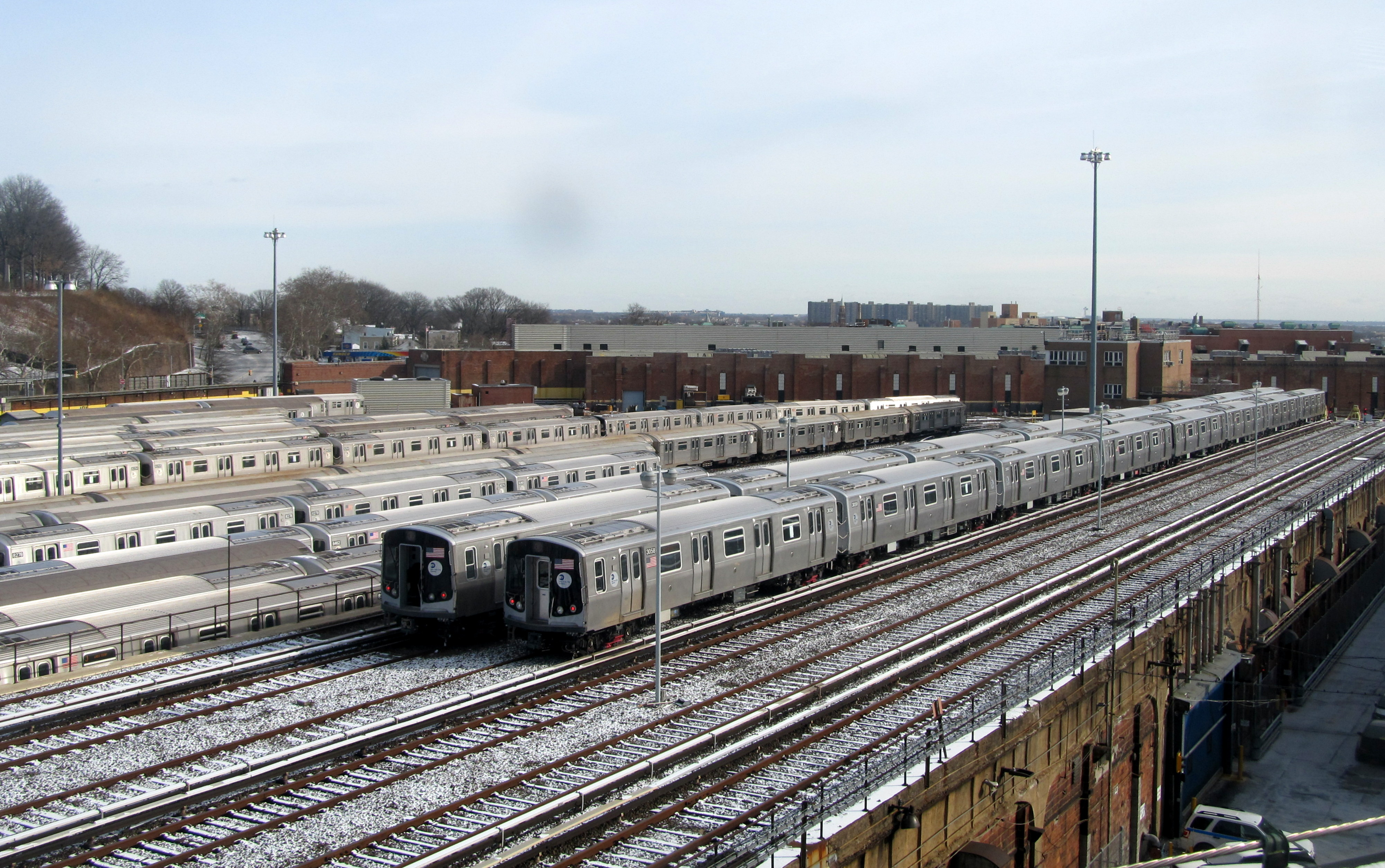
East New York Yard in 2017

East New York Yard (also known as DO (District Office) Yard from its telegraphy letters) is primarily used to store 4-car sets of R143s, R160s, and R179s used on the J/Z, L and M. Subway equipment is inspected and maintained here on a regular basis.

It is located at the junction of the Canarsie and Jamaica Lines near the intersection of Broadway and Jamaica Avenue in East New York, Brooklyn. A separate part of the facility houses the East New York Bus Depot, formerly a trolley depot. The yard is entirely equipped with hand-operated switches. Only the Fresh Pond Yard and 36th–38th Street Yard share this characteristic.

Portions of the yard date back to 1885 and the Lexington Avenue Elevated and the yard predates the rebuilding of nearby Broadway Junction, which used to be known as Manhattan Junction or East New York Loop. This yard's layup tracks are situated on 2 different levels, just like 239th Street Yard.

The yard and its main lead configuration remained the same before and after the extensive elevated line rebuilding nearby, but additional track and structure was built, so that, at its peak, East New York Yard had direct connections to the Broadway Elevated going west, Jamaica Line going east, Canarsie Line going east, and Fulton Street Elevated both east and west.

40°40′44.3″N 73°54′6.1″W

=== Fresh Pond Yard ===
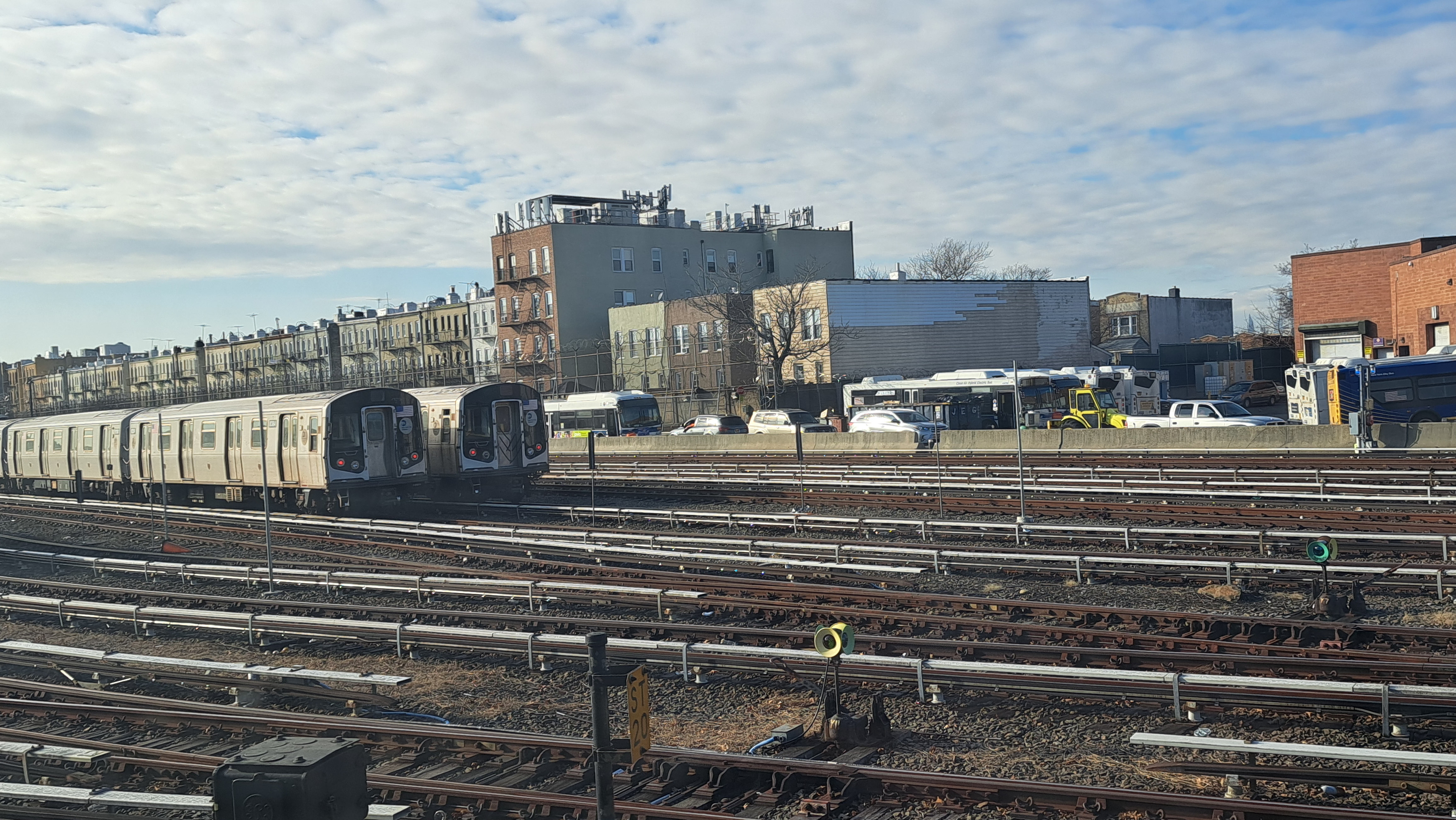
Fresh Pond Yard as seen in 2023

The Fresh Pond Yard in Ridgewood, Queens is located to the back (east) of the Fresh Pond Bus Depot, which was formerly a trolley depot. Opened with an extension of the BMT Myrtle Avenue Line in 1906, it is normally used for storing the R160s and R179s that run on the M. General maintenance of the cars is performed at East New York Yard. It is located between Fresh Pond Road and Middle Village–Metropolitan Avenue on the BMT Myrtle Avenue Line, but it is only accessible from the latter station. Trains must first platform there and then reverse into the yard. The yard is entirely equipped with hand-operated switches. Only East New York Yard and 36th–38th Street Yard share this characteristic.

40°42′26″N 73°53′36″W

=== Jamaica Yard ===
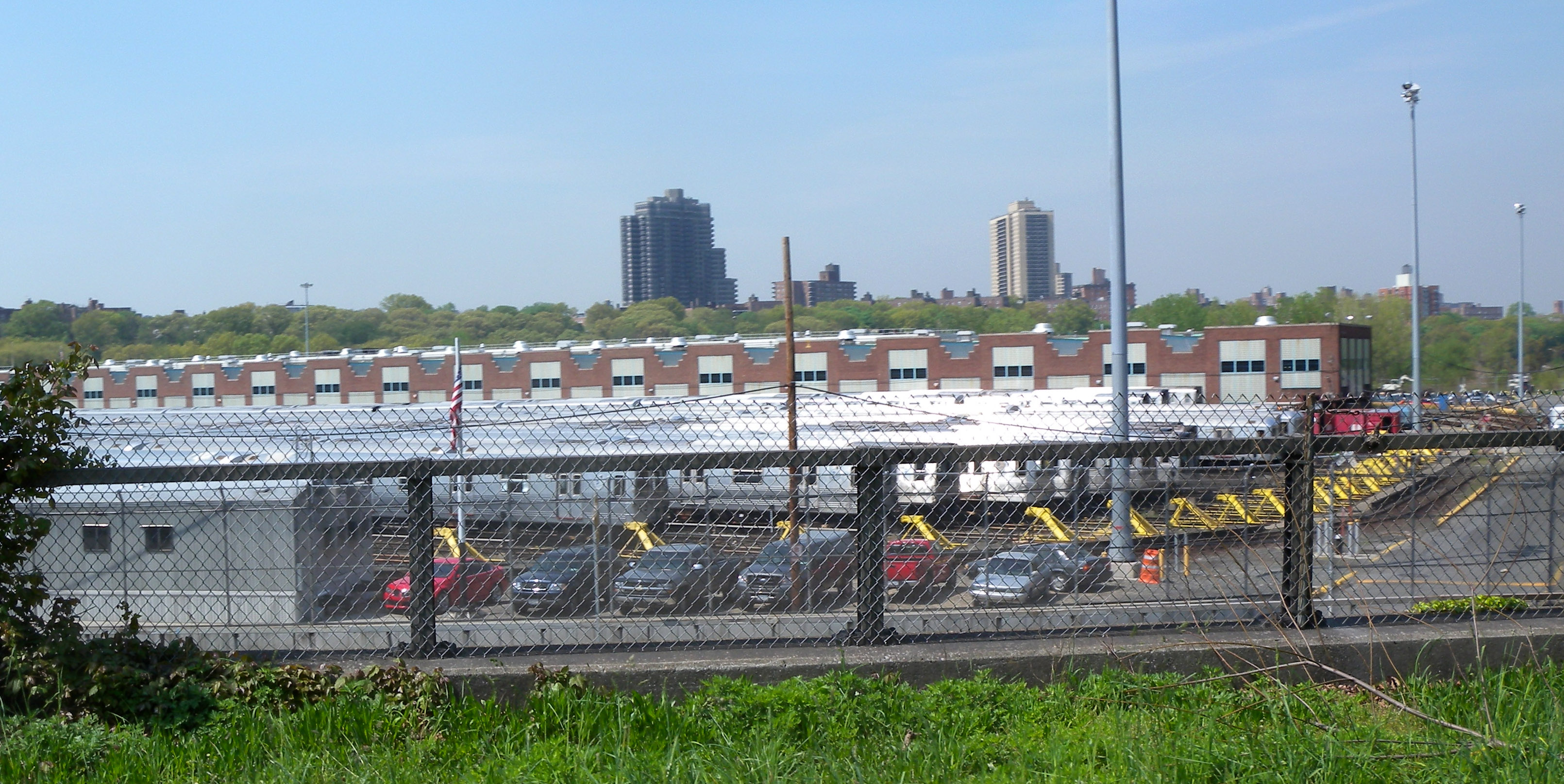
Southwestern corner of Jamaica Yard

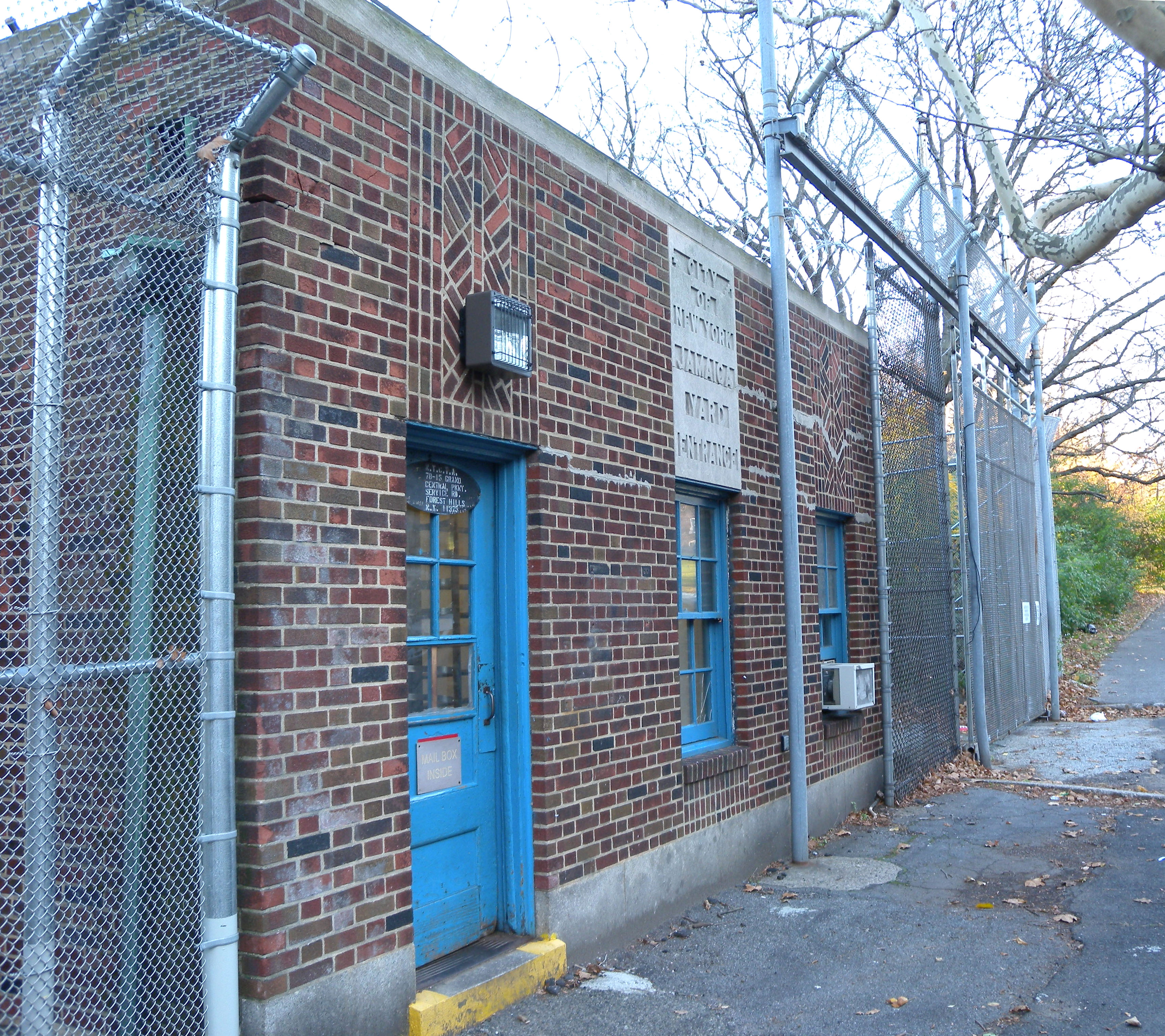
Employee entrance of Jamaica Yard

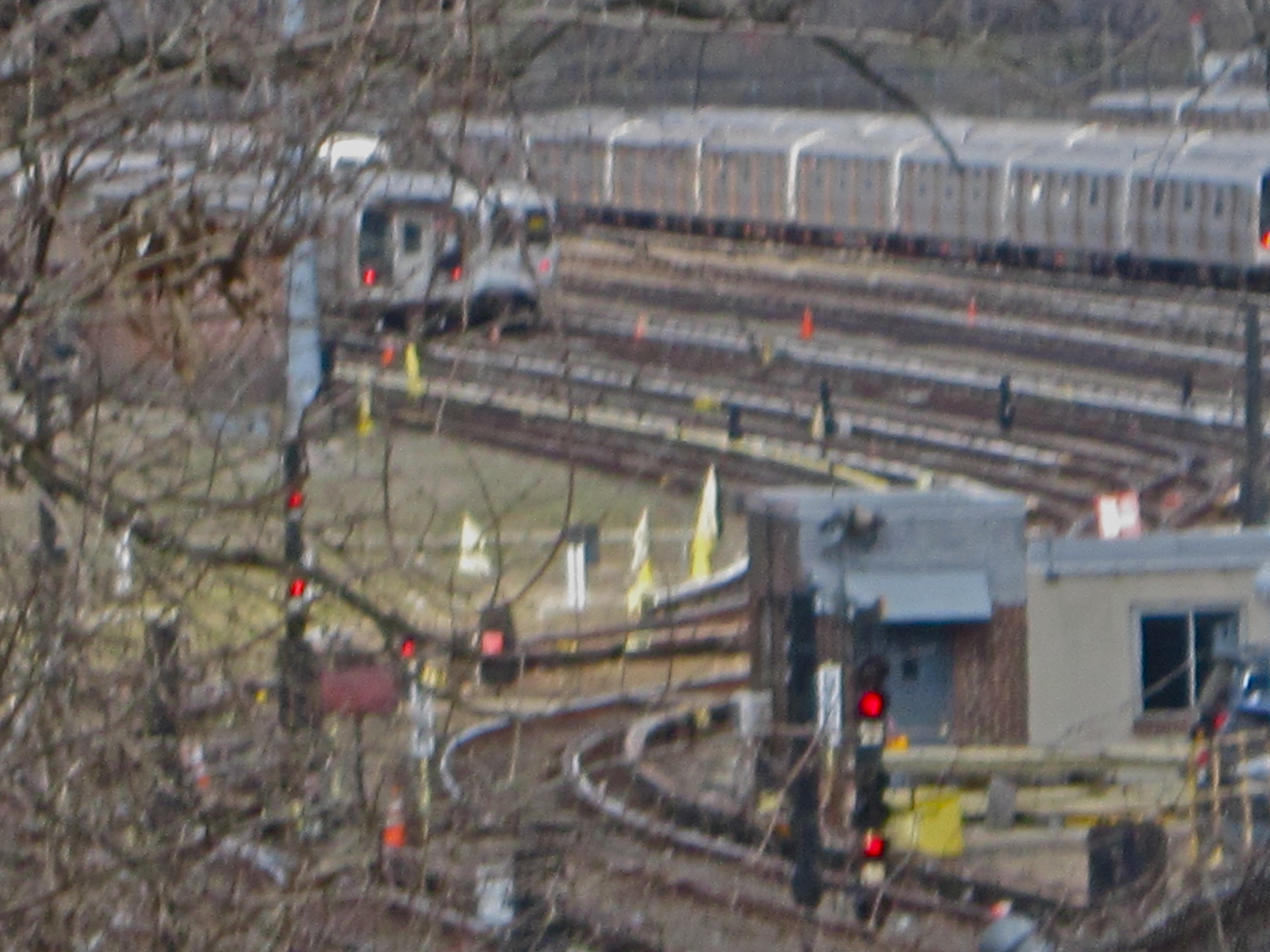
Jamaica Yard, view of R160 and R46, March 2013

Jamaica Yard is located in Forest Hills, Queens at the southern end of Flushing Meadows–Corona Park near the Kew Gardens Interchange. It has served as the primary storage yard for the IND Queens Boulevard Line since its opening in 1936. The yard connects to the Queens Boulevard Line at a three-way flying junction just geographically north of the Kew Gardens–Union Turnpike station. The yard is at surface level, and the four-track approach includes a bridge over the Grand Central Parkway; though the Queens Boulevard Line is underground, the yard lies at a lower elevation than the subway.

The property on which the yard sits used to belong to the Department of Water Supply, Gas, and Electricity, and it was transferred to the New York City Board of Transportation on April 2, 1930. The property was used as a pumping station, and once the Board of Transportation acquired the property, wells that were abandoned on the property were disturbed. These wells were connected to the water mains serving Forest Hills, Kew Gardens, and part of Flushing. $50,000 was appropriated to replace these water wells and mains by the Board of Estimate. Originally, the yard was intended to be built in the vicinity of South Elmhurst and Rego Park at Grand Street and Queens Boulevard. Once the location near Union Turnpike was decided, the communities of Forest Hills and Kew Gardens objected to it, arguing that the values of their properties would go down and the growth of the communities would end. Chairman of the Board of Transportation, John H. Delaney, overruled them, as the yard's location was not near any homes.

The yard was built for the Independent Subway System in the 1930s. Work was half finished on Jamaica Yard in April 1935, and the total cost of Jamaica Yard and storage sheds was approximately $560,000. Jamaica Yard served as the south end of the IND World's Fair Line which served the 1939 New York World's Fair from 1939 to 1940. In August 1964 it was planned that Jamaica Yard have car-washing machines installed in May 1965. The yard is home to the 5-car sets of R160s assigned to the E, F, and R whose carwash, interior cleaning, grease and minor repair services are provided at the yard. Some R160s and R179s for the M are stored here during weekdays, but are not maintained here, as the M uses shorter, four-car sets maintained at East New York Yard. Operations of the G line are based here, but actual fleet itself is based in the Coney Island Yard.

There are more subway cars assigned to Jamaica Yard than to any other rapid transit yard in the city. As a result, there is chronic overcrowding at the existing facility. The Metropolitan Transportation Authority plans to enlarge this yard due to this overcrowding; many trains are stored on the IND Queens Boulevard mainline express tracks east of 71st Avenue and the 179th Street station's relay yard during off-peak periods. This expansion will double the storage capacity of the facility. The expansion project has been planned since the 1982–1986 MTA Capital Program. The four yard leads will also be equipped with communications-based train control (CBTC) as part of the installation of CBTC on the Queens Boulevard Line.

40°43′12″N 73°49′41″W

=== Pitkin Yard ===
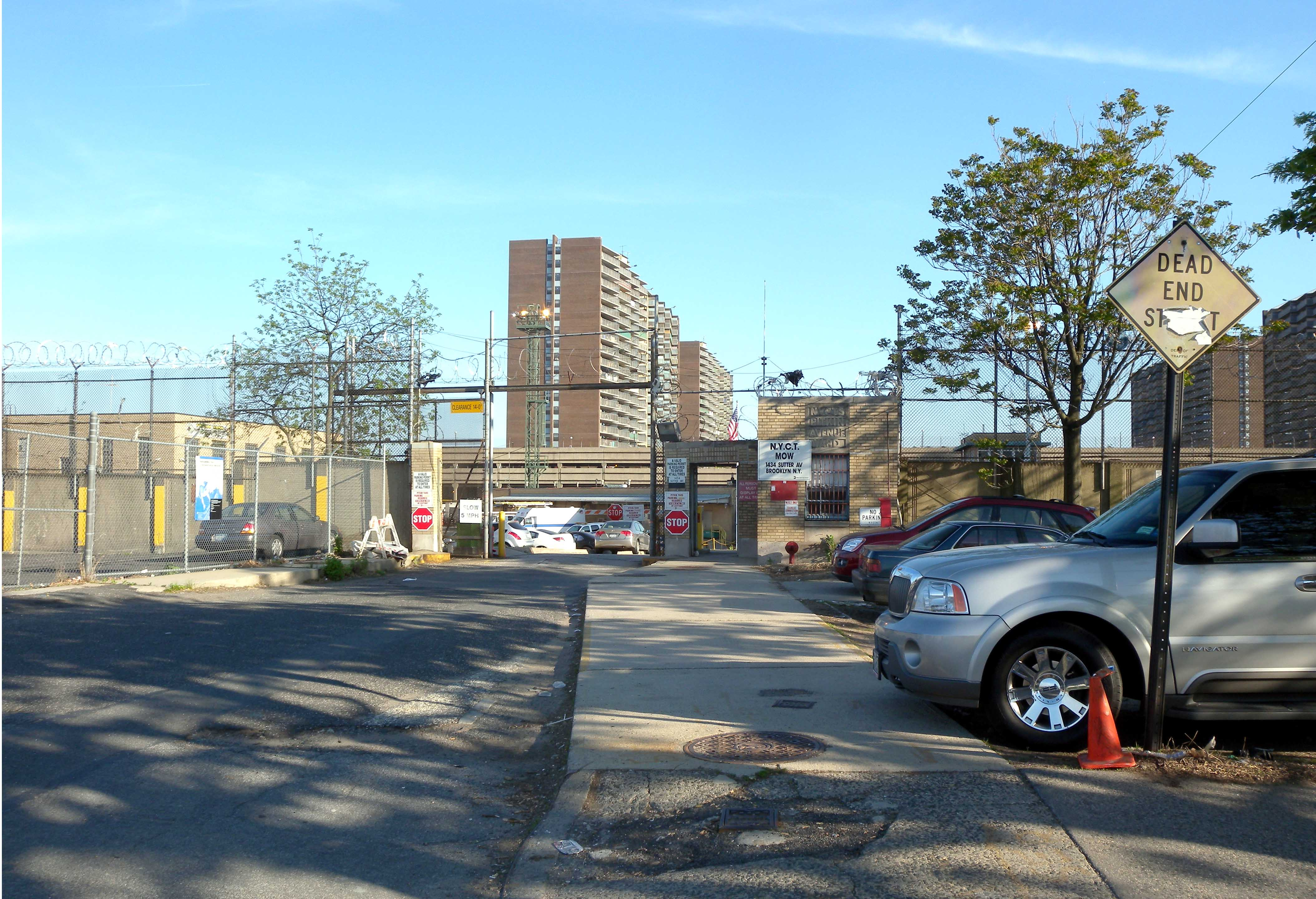
Grant Avenue entrance of Pitkin Yard

Pitkin Yard is located in East New York, Brooklyn. It holds the Pitkin Shops, which maintain the R211As and R211s used on the A, C, and Rockaway Park Shuttle.

Track connections from the yard connect both west (railroad north) to Euclid Avenue and east (railroad south) past Grant Avenue on the IND Fulton Street Line. This allows trains to be added or removed from service in either direction.

The site for Pitkin Yard was approved by the Board of Estimate on February 8, 1940 in order to serve the extension of the Fulton Street Line. The total cost for the acquiring the property for the yard was estimated to be $773,000 for 30 acres. The yard opened on November 28, 1948 along with the extension of the IND Fulton Street Line to Euclid Avenue. Previously an open-air yard, from 1972 to 1973, the Linden Plaza & Towers Apartment Complex, consisting of several 15-to-17-story apartment buildings, was constructed on a concrete deck on top of this yard.

40°40′21″N 73°51′54″W

=== Rockaway Park Yard ===
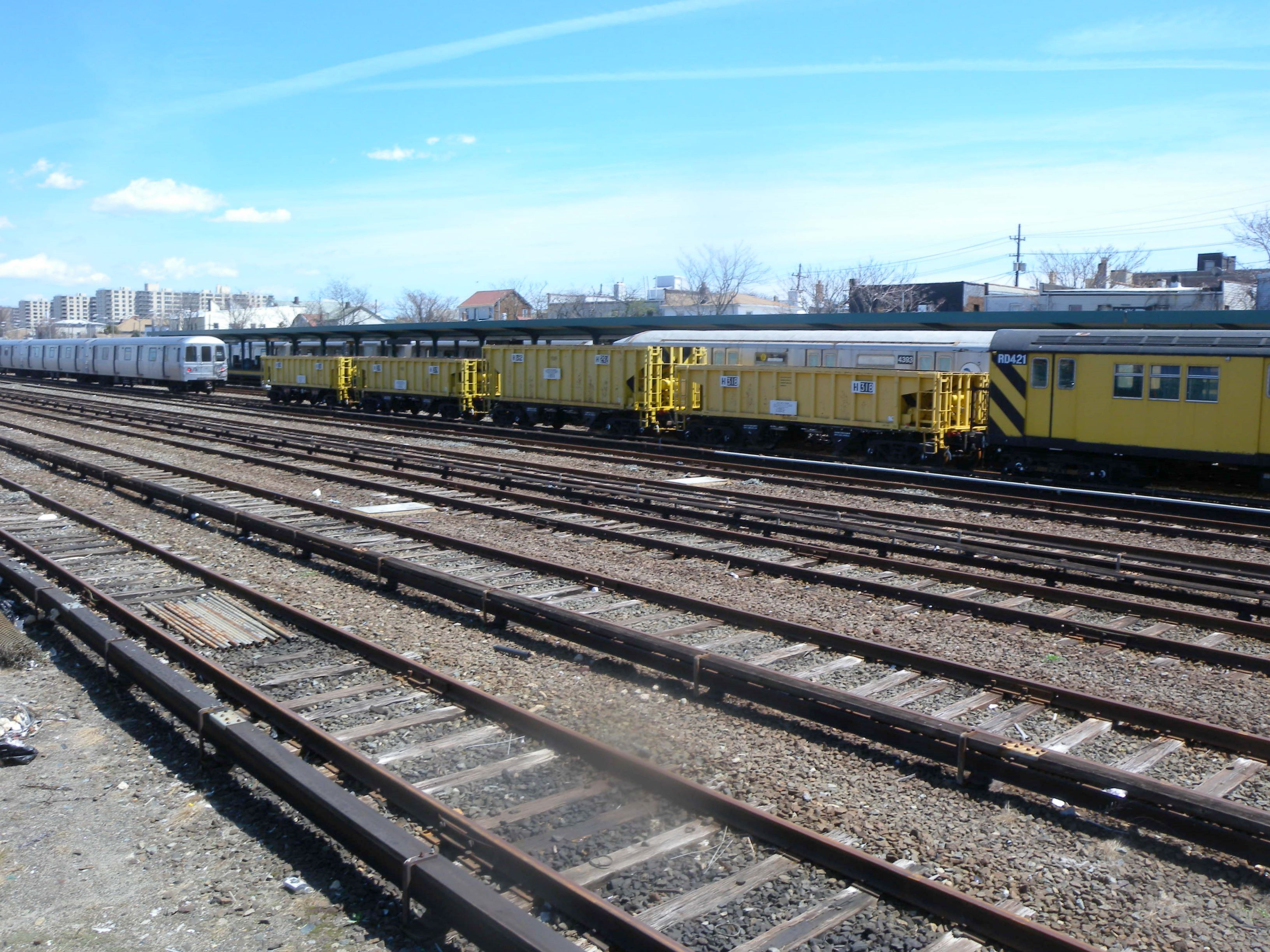
Eastern end of Rockaway Park Yard

Rockaway Park Yard is located in Rockaway Park, Queens. It is an eight-track layup yard for the R211As on the A and the Rockaway Park Shuttle. General maintenance of the cars is performed at Pitkin Yard. Seven tracks lie geographically north of the station platform, while another lies geographically south.

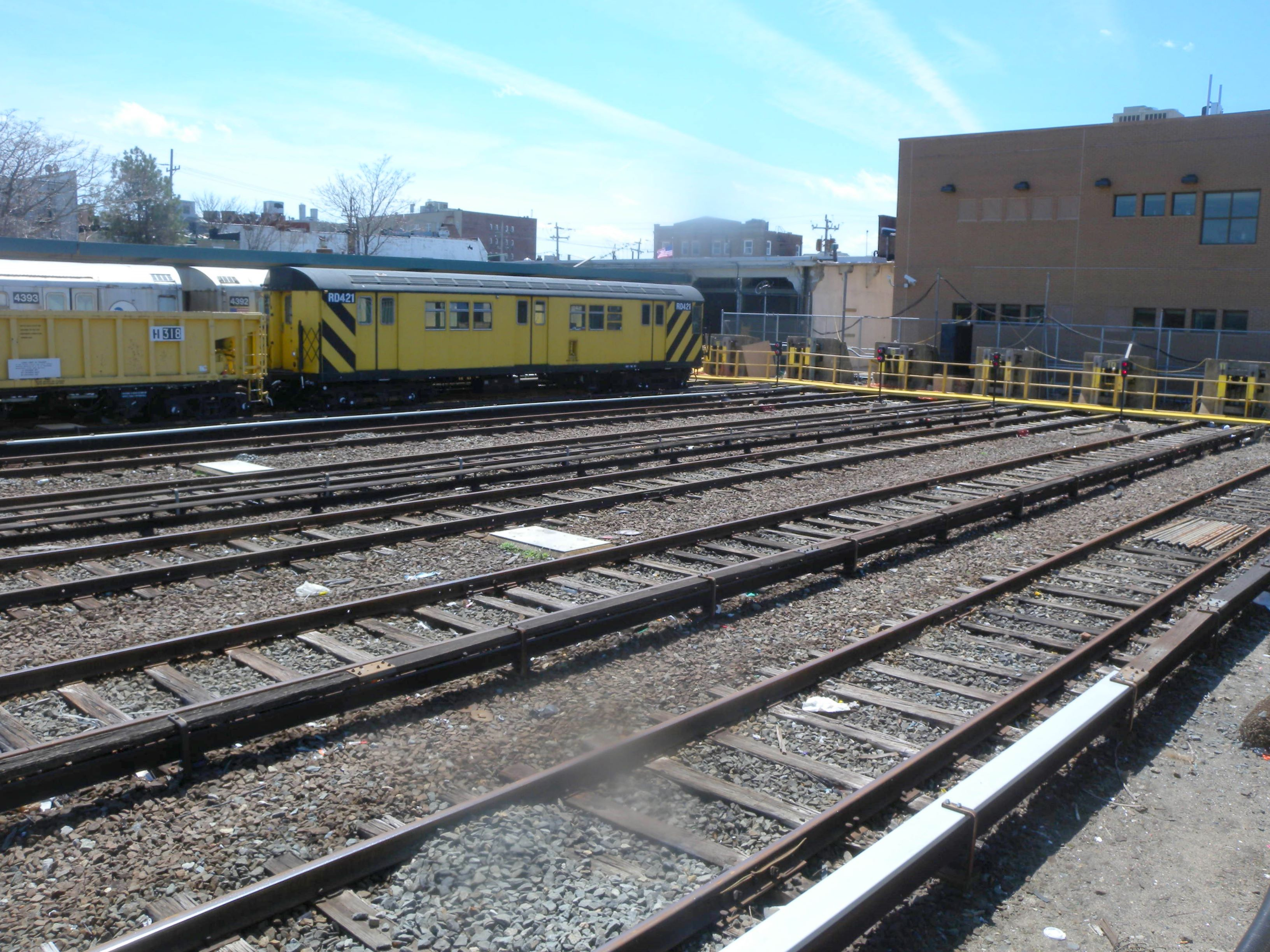
Western end of Rockaway Park Yard

This yard is adjacent to Rockaway Park–Beach 116th Street. Like the IND Rockaway Line itself, the Rockaway Yard was originally a yard for the Rockaway Beach Branch of the Long Island Rail Road. It included a water tower and a roundhouse.

40°34′52″N 73°50′8″W

== Yards in both divisions ==
=== 207th Street Yard ===
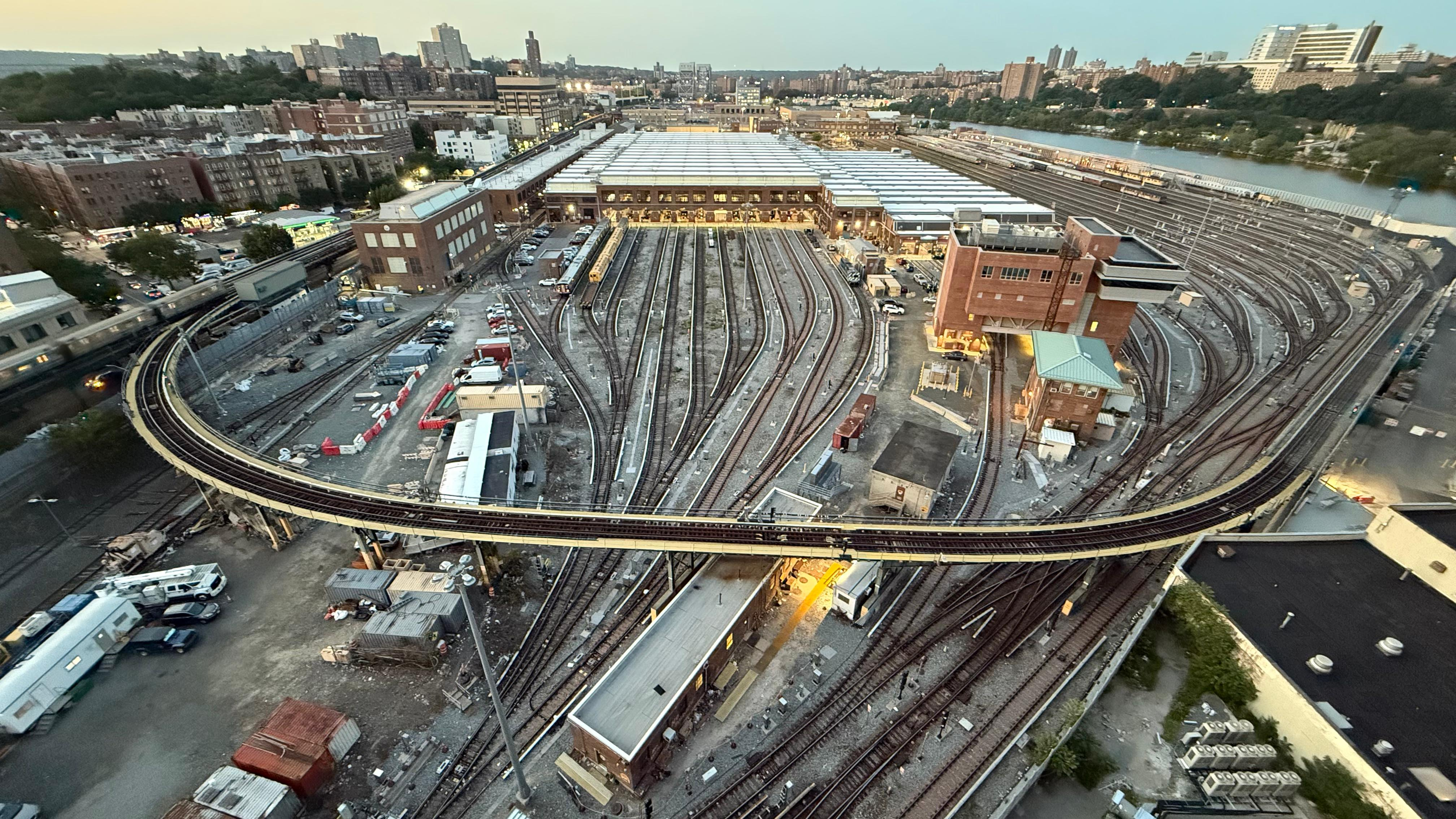
View of 207th Street Yard from a nearby building, July 2025

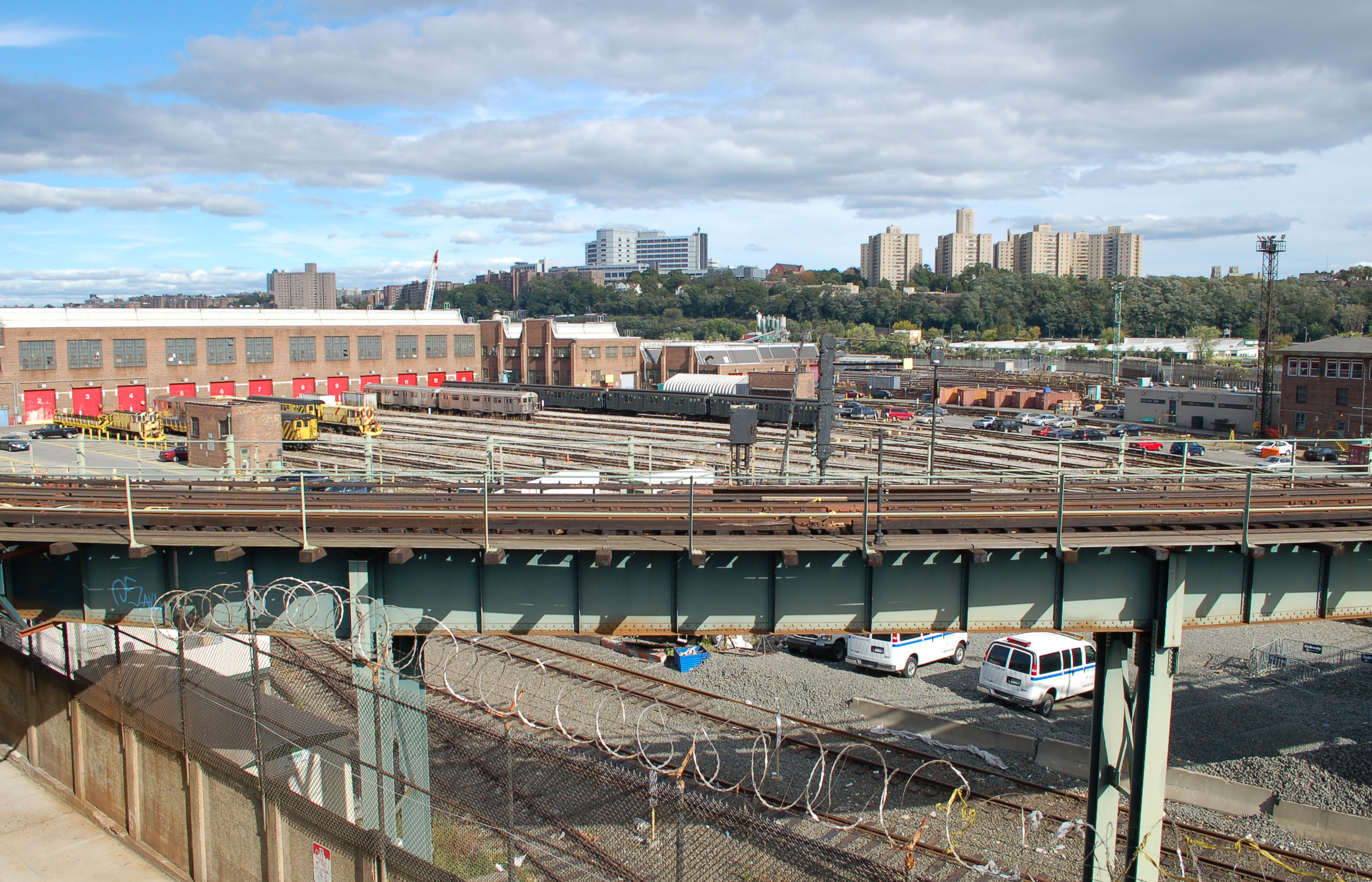
View of 207th Street Yard from the southwest – note the Museum cars.

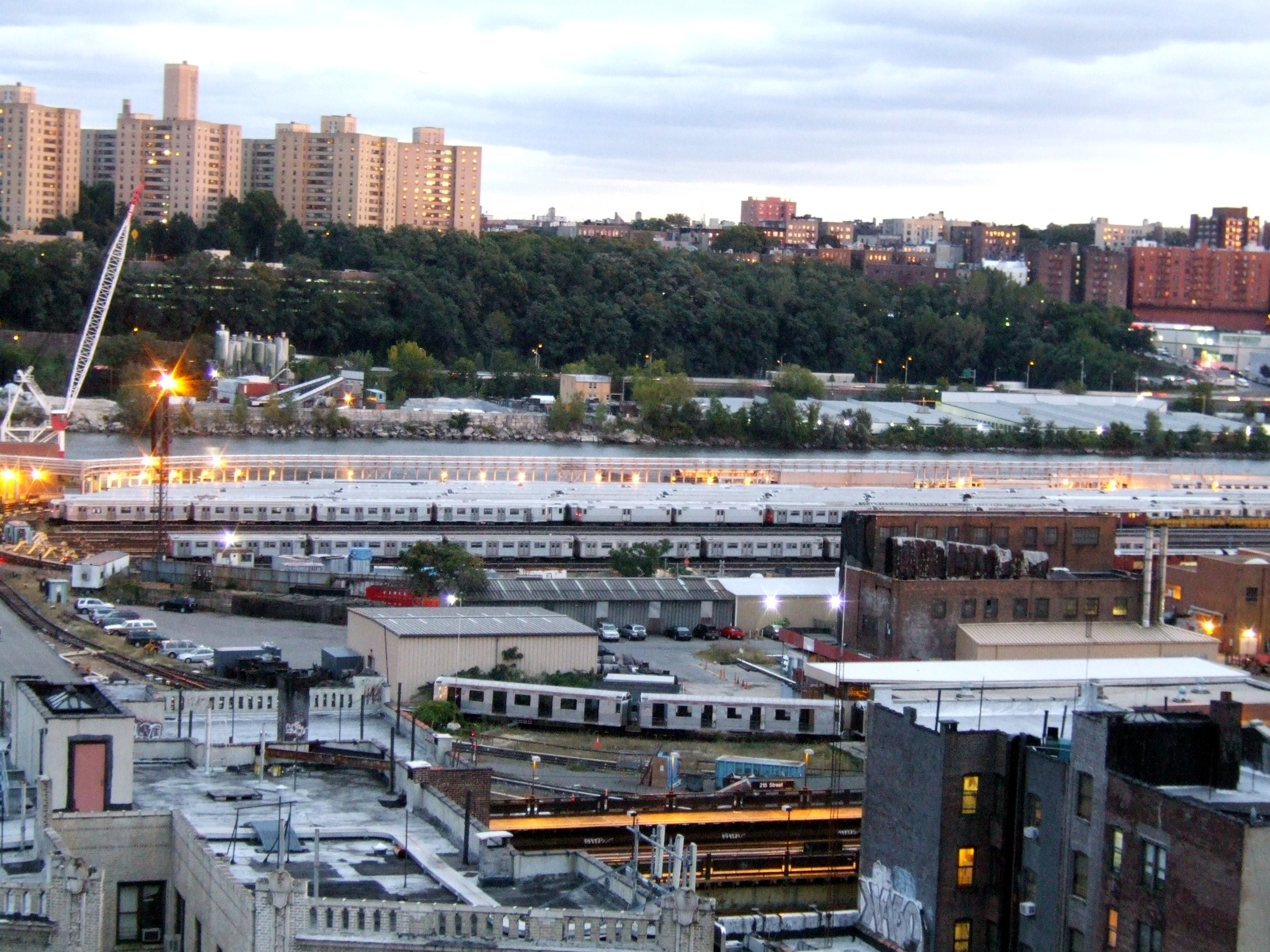
View of 207th Street Yard from a nearby building

The 207th Street Yard is located in Inwood in Upper Manhattan between Tenth Avenue and the Harlem River north of the University Heights Bridge. The outdoor yard, which was originally constructed for the B Division, extends north from 207th Street to 215th Street. The yard is home to the R179s that are used on the A and C. There is a car wash here.

The 207th Street Shop is one of two heavy overhaul shops in the New York City Subway system (the other being the Coney Island Yard in Brooklyn) and it provides for the overhaul and rebuilding of some A Division cars as well as most B Division rolling stock. The yard stores cars that are being retired or awaiting scrapping, and it also restores cars designated for the New York Transit Museum. It also contains a garbage transfer station. Formerly, the retired cars that were stored at the yard were stripped of usable parts such as seats and doors, historic memorabilia such as rollsigns, and toxic materials such as lubricants and asbestos, after which the cars were scrapped or sunk into artificial reefs such as Redbird Reef.

South of the yard, connecting tracks lead to the IND Eighth Avenue Line. A separate connecting track and flyover leads to the IRT Broadway–Seventh Avenue Line.

A major rehabilitation project for the yard took place in 2016.

40°52′0″N 73°55′0″W

=== Concourse Yard ===
- Concourse Yard Entry Buildings
- U.S. National Register of Historic Places
- New York State Register of Historic Places
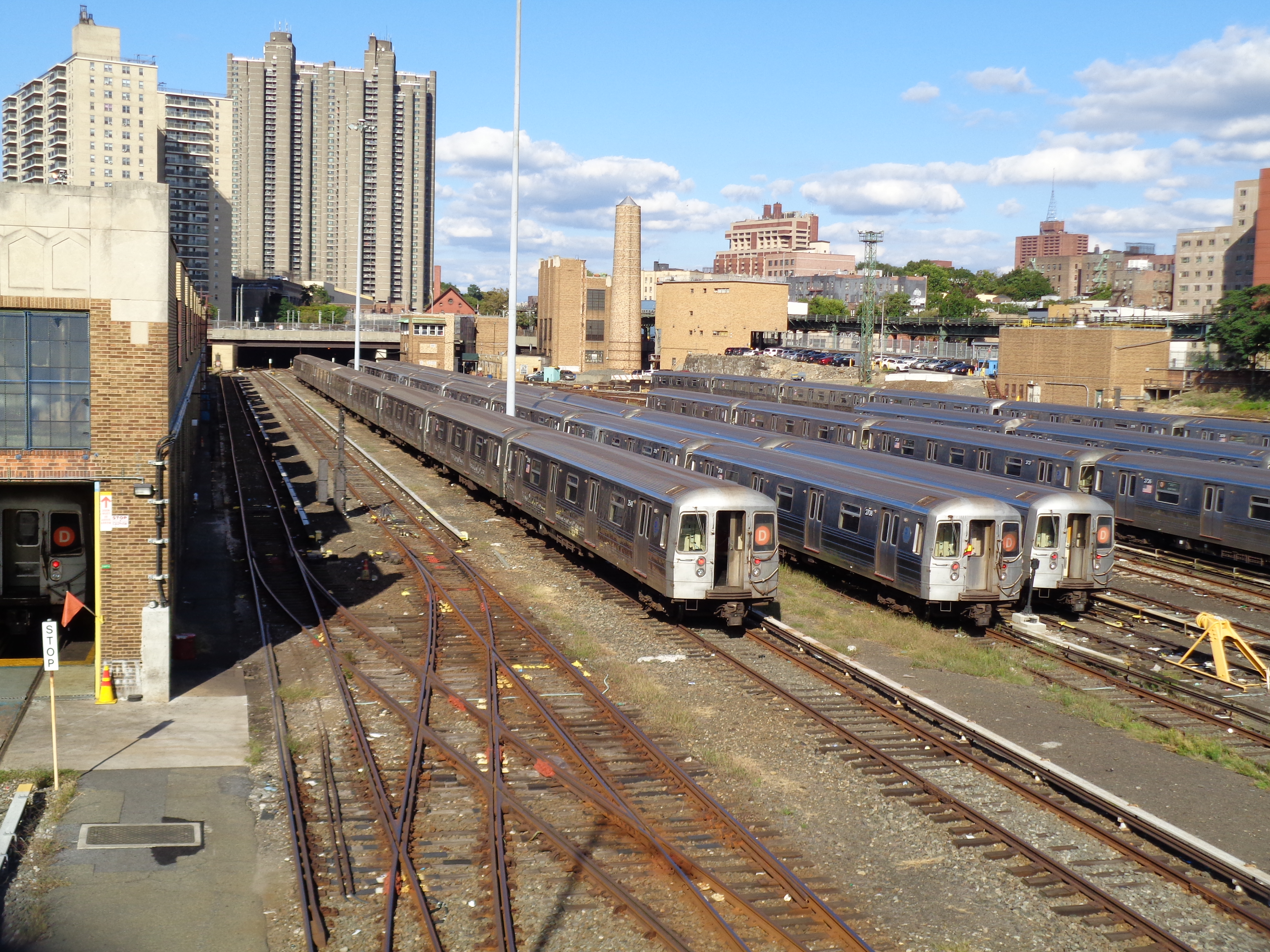

- Location within New York City
- Location: West 205th Street, between Jerome and Paul Avenues, Bronx, New York
- Coordinates: 40°52′35″N 73°53′20″W
- Area: less than one acre
- Built: 1933
- Architects: Ridgeway, Robert
- Architectural style: Art Deco
- MPS: New York City Subway System MPS
- NRHP reference No.: 06000014
- Concourse Yard Substation
- U.S. National Register of Historic Places
- New York State Register of Historic Places
- Location: 3119 Jerome Avenue, Bronx, New York
- NRHP reference No.: 06000013
- NYSRHP No.: 00501.000850
- Designated NYSRHP: September 19, 2005
- NYSRHP No.: 00501.001353

Significant dates
- Added to NRHP: February 9, 2006
- Designated NYSRHP: September 19, 2005

The Concourse Yard is located in the northern Bronx near the intersection of 205th Street and Jerome Avenue. The yard was built on the old site of the Jerome Park Reservoir. The Reservoir was planned to have two basins, an eastern basin and a western basin. The western basin opened in 1906. The two basins are divided by Goulden Avenue, and land for the eastern basin was cleared and partially excavated in anticipation of construction. The two-basin plan was abandoned in 1912, and the excavated area for the eastern basin was filled and graded. In addition to the building of the subway yard on that site, Lehman College, three high schools, a park, and several public housing developments were also built there. The yard was built at a depressed grade, 18 feet below grade, to allow for the yard to be roofed over to allow for the construction of buildings. The tracks were spaced apart to permit the placing of stable foundations and columns to support buildings that can could be erected atop the proposed roof of the yard. The yard was originally bounded by Navy Avenue (now Paul Avenue), Jerome Avenue, 205th Street, and Bedford Park Boulevard. Provisions were made to extend the yard south to 198th Street.

In the 1960s, the City University of New York planned to build a new campus for Bronx Community College by constructing a deck over the yard. In 1970, ground was broken for the $61 million, 13-acre campus, which was going to rest on 800 columns between the yard tracks. The platform over the yard was expected to be completed in July 1971. The project was abandoned after the City discovered that the pillars were built slightly too short, which would have prevented subway cars from entering and leaving the yard had the project been finished. The possibility of building atop the yard was brought back by Bronx Borough President Ruben Diaz Junior in 2015. In a report, the yard was found to have great potential for development, allowing for the building of mixed-income housing, retail space, and an expansion of Lehman College. The low-end cost for the construction of the deck is projected to be $350 to $500 million.

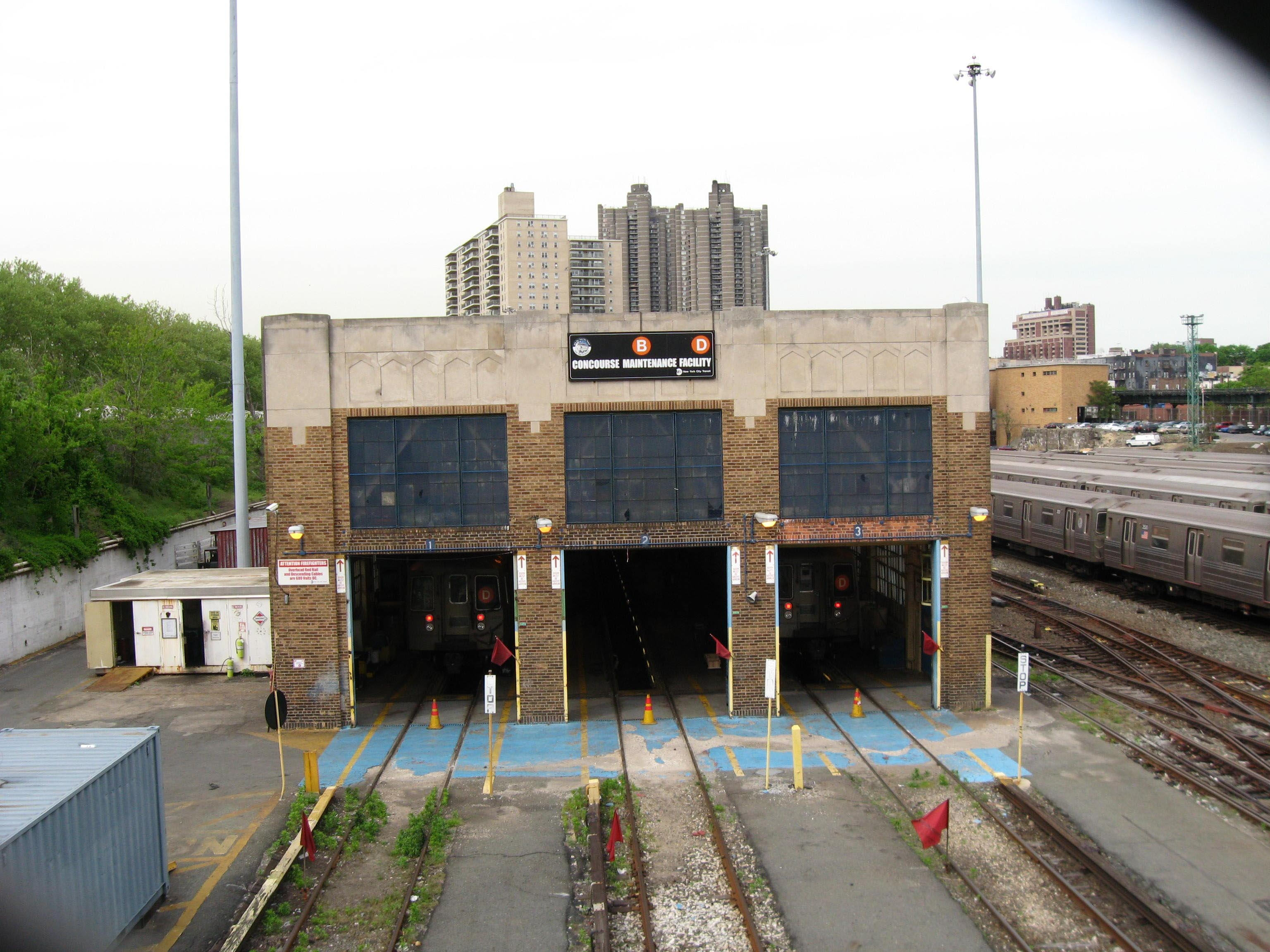
Concourse Yard maintenance building

This yard is home to the R68s and R211As assigned to the D. Some R68s, R68As, and R211As assigned to the B are also washed and stored here, but not maintained or inspected here. The R142s and R142As assigned to the 4 are washed and stored here as well. The yard contains three tracks for maintenance, and 36 storage tracks. The yard itself can store 255 cars, and the inspection shed can accommodate 30 cars. The yard also contains a car wash, which also washes cars from the nearby Jerome Yard. Connecting tracks lead north from the yard to the IND Concourse Line and south to the IRT Jerome Avenue Line. Concourse Yard is spanned across its middle by Bedford Park Boulevard West, and at its northern end by a 205th Street viaduct. The Jerome Yard used by the IRT Jerome Avenue Line lies to the north of 205th Street.

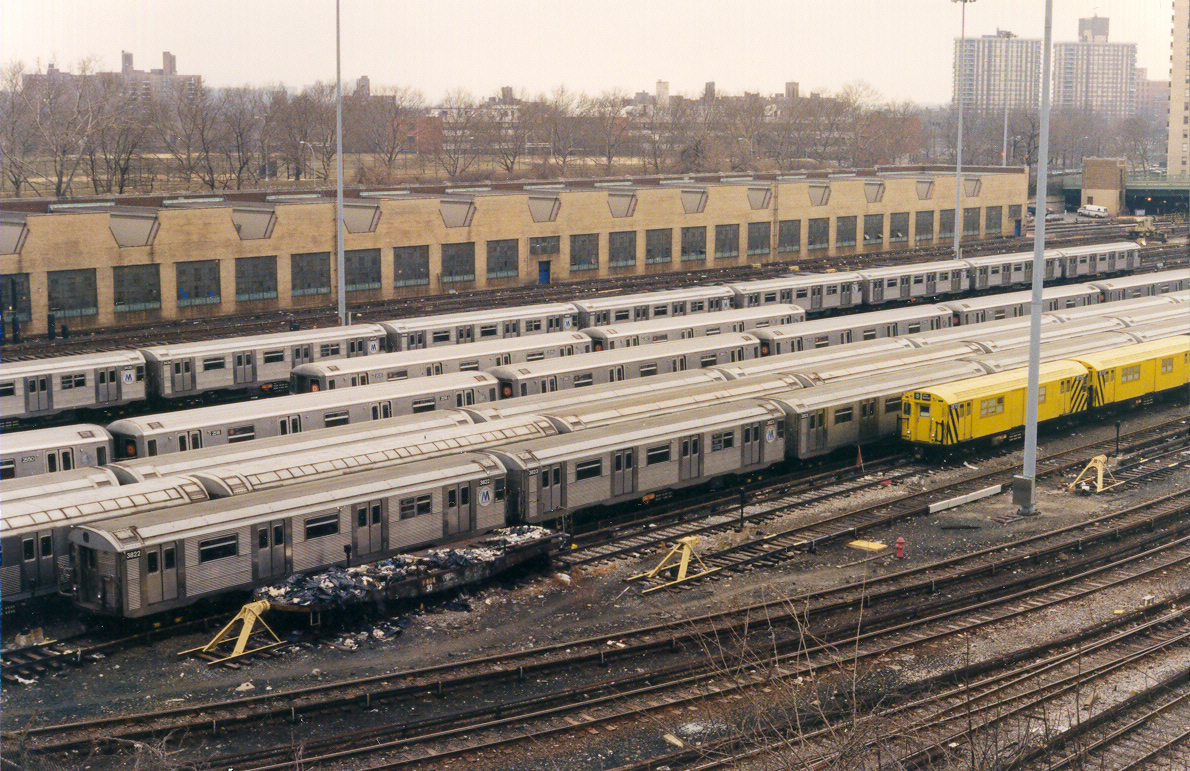
Concourse Yard from the southeast

The Concourse Yard Entry Buildings and Concourse Yard Substation were listed on the National Register of Historic Places in 2006. The former consists of two, three-story brick buildings with only the top story visible from the street that are built next to one another to form a gateway to the Concourse Yard. They feature ornamental limestone columns and aluminum doors. The buildings are connected by an iron bridge that retains its original Art Deco balustrade. The latter is a one-story brick building measuring 50 feet by 100 feet and featuring a brick parapet with ornamental limestone and aluminum doors.

40°52′28″N 73°53′25″W

== Other yards ==
=== 36th–38th Street Yard ===
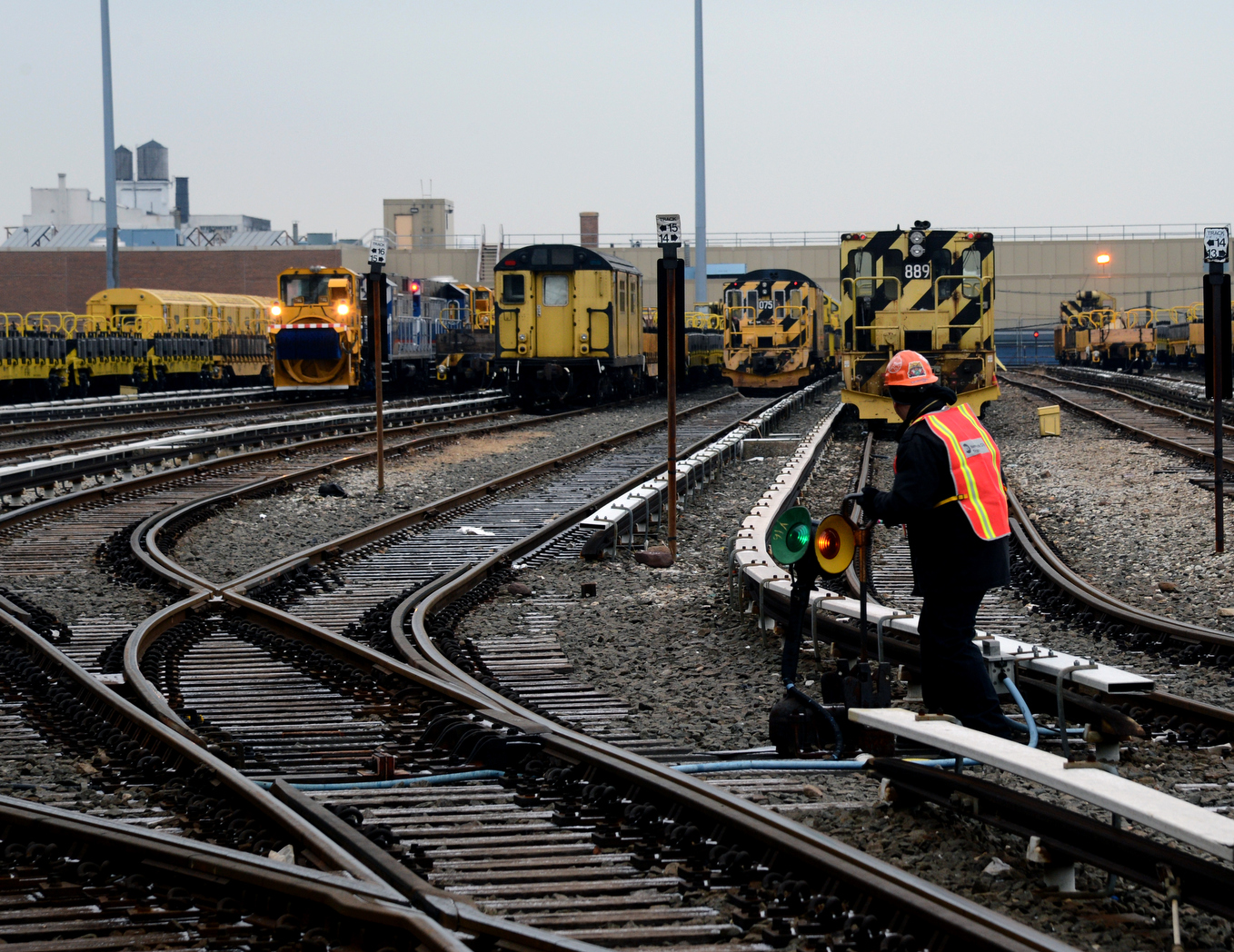
Western portion of the 36th–38th Street Yard, and a hand-operated switch.

The 36th–38th Street Yard, sometimes referred to as simply the 38th Street Yard, is located between Fifth and Seventh Avenues in Sunset Park, Brooklyn, adjacent to the Jackie Gleason Bus Depot and the Ninth Avenue station of the BMT West End Line. Green-Wood Cemetery lies to the north of the yard. This yard is not normally used for revenue-service train maintenance. Its primary function is to store diesel and electrically powered maintenance-of-way and other non-revenue service rolling stock. It is also used to transfer trash from garbage collector trains to trucks via platforms inside the yard just south of 37th Street. There is a control tower for the West End Line at the south end of the yard. The yard is entirely equipped with hand-operated switches. Only Fresh Pond Yard and East New York Yard share this characteristic.

The Metropolitan Transportation Authority plans to enlarge, and modernize this yard to accommodate, inspect and maintain additional revenue service trains here, due to chronic overcrowding at their other existing main facilities, as many trains are stored on the BMT Fourth Avenue Line's mainline express tracks during off-peak periods. The expanded yard will also provide much-needed storage space for future Second Avenue Subway trains. Up to twelve storage tracks would be added along with power switches, with some non-revenue trains relocated to other areas. Plans to expand the yard for revenue service trains have existed since the late 1980s.

This southern part of the yard used to be the center of the South Brooklyn Railway (owned by the Brooklyn Rapid Transit Company), which extended from Bush Terminal through the north part of the yard, then down Gravesend Avenue and into the Coney Island Yard. What is now the Jackie Gleason Bus Depot (formally Fifth Avenue Depot) was previously the site of a train inspection shed.

40°38′52″N 73°59′48″W

=== Linden Shops ===
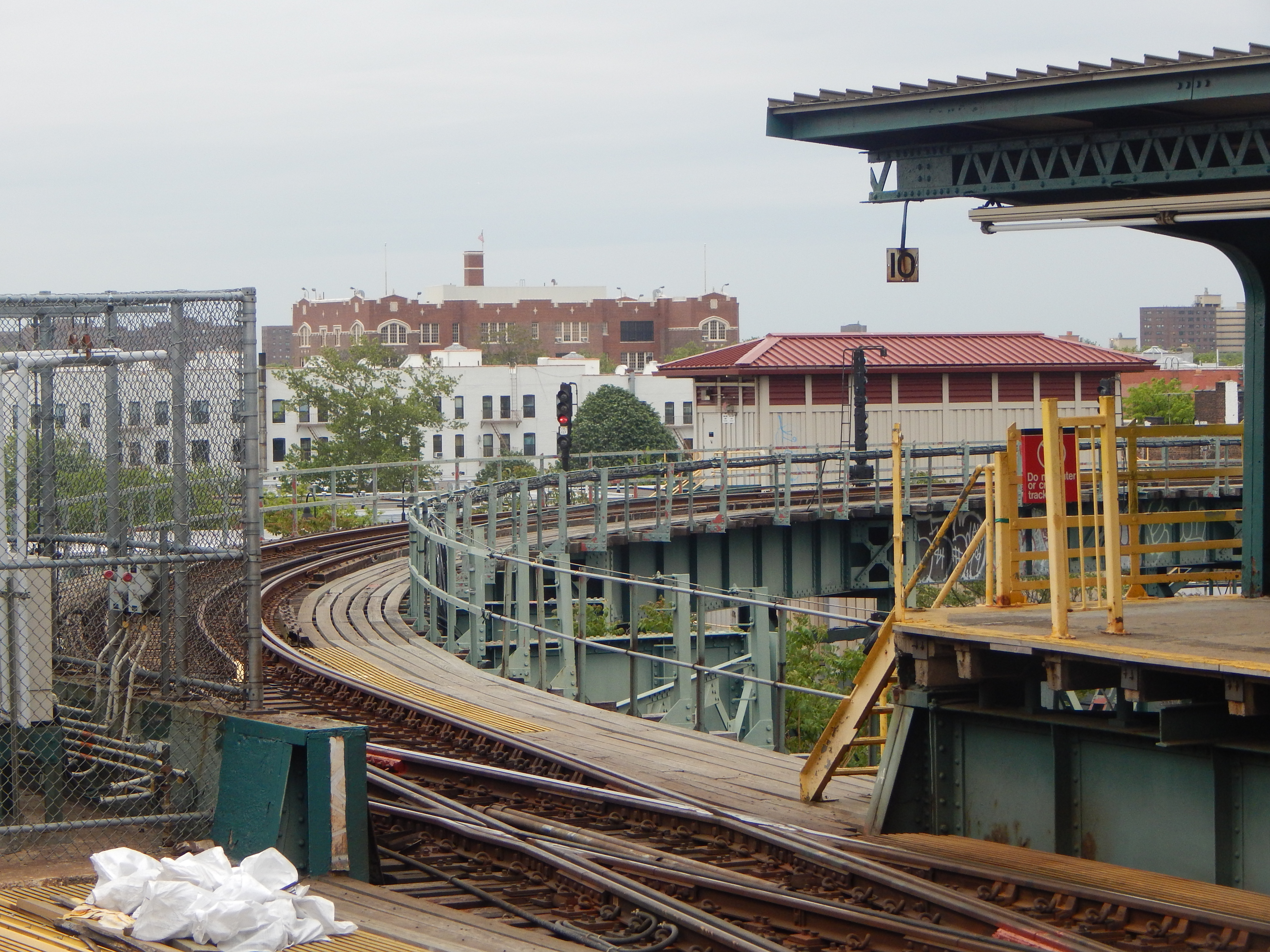
The switch to Linden Yard at the Junius Street station

Linden Shops is a track shop, where track switches and other components are assembled. It has track connections to the IRT New Lots Line and the BMT Canarsie Line, but no third rail, restricting the facility to diesel-powered trains only. There is also a track connection to the Long Island Rail Road's Bay Ridge Branch. This connection is one of two from the subway to the mainline United States rail network (the connection between the BMT West End Line and the South Brooklyn Railway is the other).

40°39′13″N 73°54′16″W

=== Clifton Yard ===
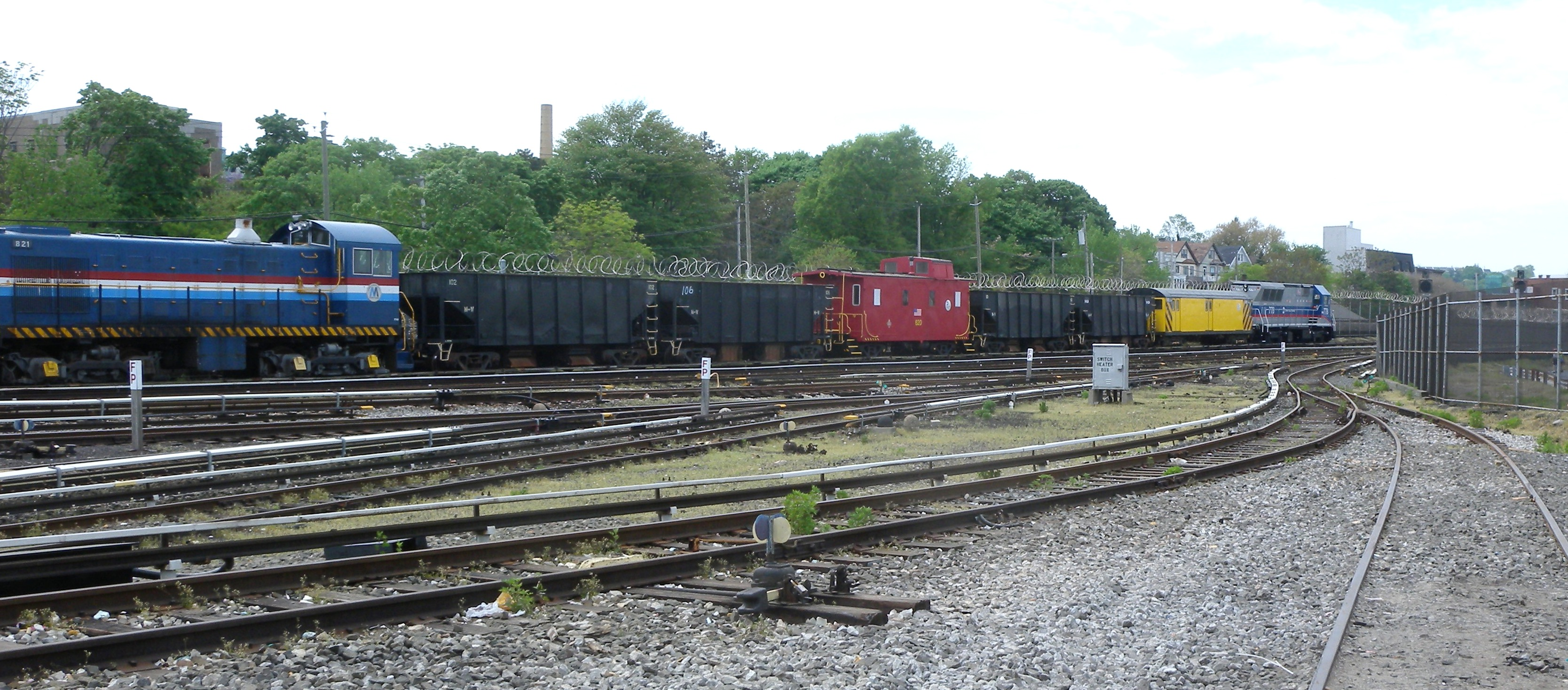
Clifton Yard

The Clifton Yard is the sole yard on the Staten Island Railway, and is located next to the Clifton station. Heavy maintenance of equipment is performed at the Clifton Yard. As there is no connection from the passenger portion of the Staten Island Railway to the mainline U.S. railroad network or the subway, the R211Ss that run on the Staten Island Railway must be trucked over the Verrazzano–Narrows Bridge to Coney Island Yard if they need maintenance that Clifton Yard cannot perform. Additional storage for revenue trains is located adjacent to the Tottenville station at the south end of the line, while maintenance of non-revenue trains is performed at a Maintenance of Way shop near the Tompkinsville station.

On December 7, 2022, the yard's rebuilt maintenance shop was completed. It had undergone major damage following Superstorm Sandy in 2012. The new 93,220 square-foot facility also included offices and support buildings. The shop was built with four tracks for cleaning, repairs and inspections. An overhead lifting system was installed to enable roof-mounted air conditioning units to be replaced. The new shop was constructed to withstand a three-foot storm surge and winds up to 110 miles per hour (a Category 2 hurricane). As part of the project, switches and tracks were reconfigured, utilities and traction power equipment were relocated, existing systems, including underground diesel, were removed, asbestos and lead abatement work took place, and underground storage tanks for fuel were removed. The $165 million project was funded by the Federal Transit Administration.

40.6215°N 74.0715°W
