= R-110 =

R-110, R110, R.110, R 110 or variant may refer to:

- Road 110
  - Route 110 (highway 110)
  - R110 road (Ireland)
- Freon R-110 (hexachloroethane), see List of refrigerants
- R110, designation for the prototype New Technology Train on the New York City Subway, specifically:
  - R110A (New York City Subway car)
  - R110B (New York City Subway car)
- R110, the fictional robot, see TimeSplitters

== See also ==
- Škoda 110 R
