= R143 (New York City Subway car) =

Class of New York City Subway car

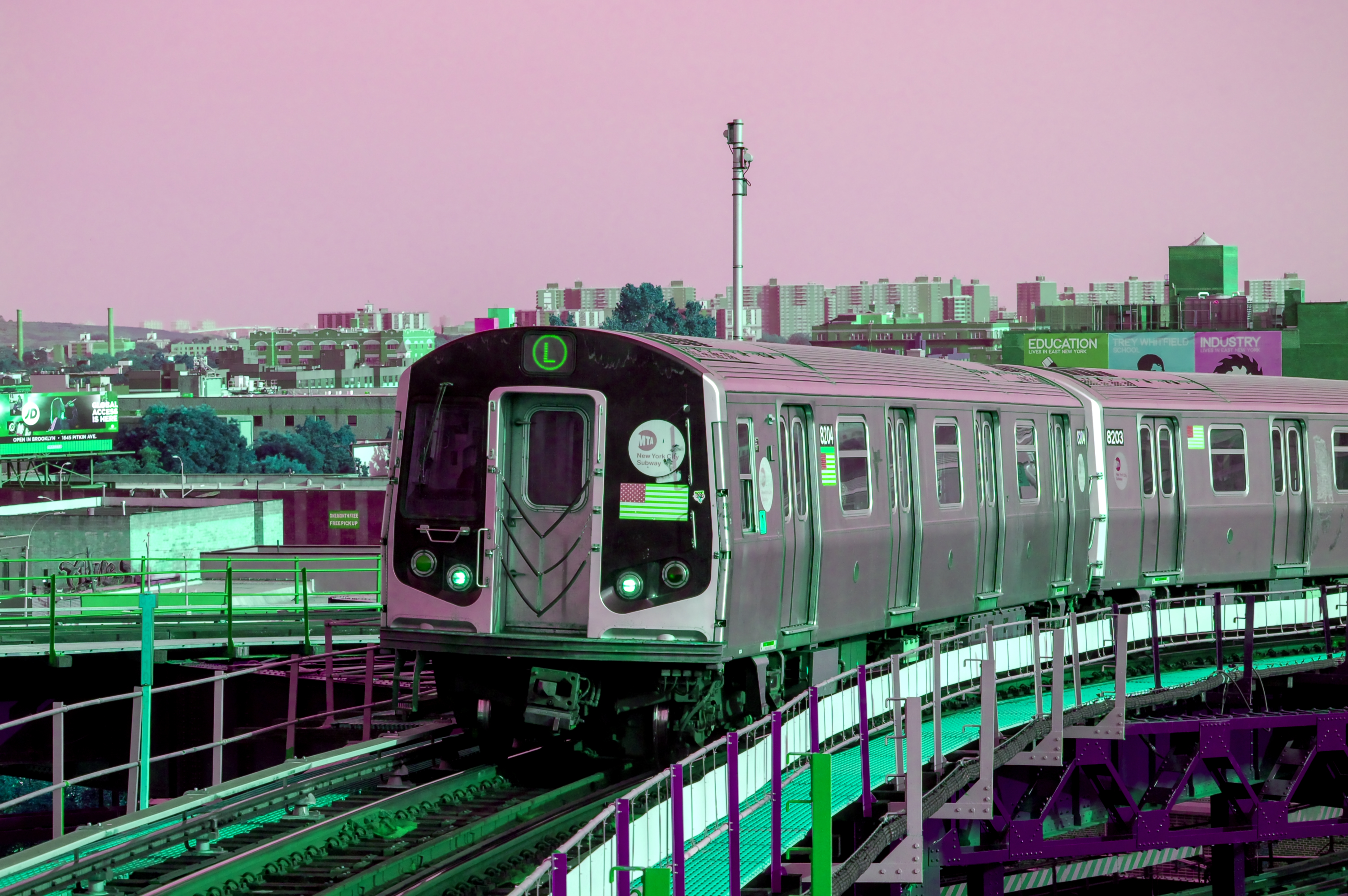
- An R143 train on the L route entering Broadway Junction station

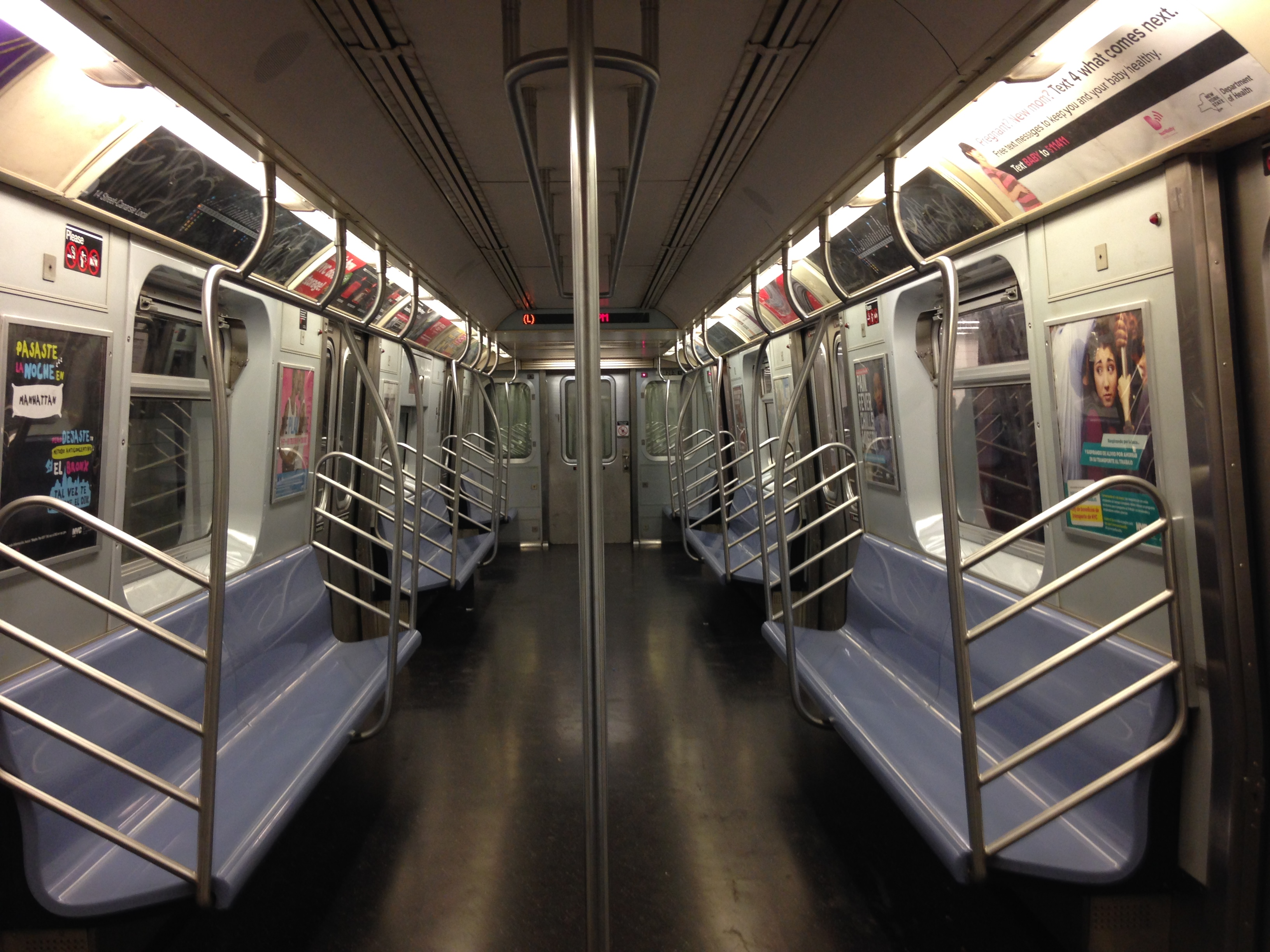
- Interior of an R143 car
- In service: December 4, 2001 – present (24 years)
- Manufacturer: Kawasaki Rail Car Company
- Built at: Yonkers, New York, US; Lincoln, Nebraska, US; Kobe, Hyōgo, Japan
- Family name: New Technology Train
- Replaced: Displaced R40s and R42s on the L route
- Constructed: 2001–2003
- Entered service: December 4, 2001 (acceptance testing); February 12, 2002 (official service)
- Number built: 212
- Number in service: 212
- Formation: 53 4-car sets (2 A cars and 2 B cars)
- Fleet numbers: 8101–8312
- Capacity: 240 (A car); 246 (B car)
- Operator: New York City Subway
- Depot: East New York Yard
- Services assigned: (Updated June 30, 2024)

Specifications
- Car body construction: Stainless steel with fiberglass rear bonnets
- Train length: 4 car train: 240 ft 10.08 in (73.4080 m); 8 car train: 481 ft 8.16 in (146.8161 m)
- Car length: 60 ft 2.52 in (18,352.0 mm)
- Width: 9 ft 9.28 in (2,979 mm)
- Height: 12 ft 0.29 in (3,665 mm)
- Floor height: 3 ft 9.12 in (1,146.0 mm)
- Platform height: 3 ft 9.12 in (1,146.0 mm)
- Entry: Level
- Doors: 8 sets of 50 inch wide side doors per car
- Maximum speed: 55 mph (89 km/h)
- Weight: A car: 83,700 lb (38,000 kg); B car: 81,900 lb (37,100 kg)
- Traction system: Adtranz/Bombardier PWM 2-level IGBT–VVVF
- Traction motors: 4 × Bombardier 1508C 150 hp (111.9 kW) 3-phase AC induction motor
- Power output: 2,400 hp (1,789.680 kW) (4-car set)
- Acceleration: 2.5 mph/s (4.0 km/(h⋅s))
- Deceleration: 3.0 mph/s (4.8 km/(h⋅s)) (full service); 3.2 mph/s (5.1 km/(h⋅s)) (emergency)
- Auxiliaries: SAFT 250AH battery (B car)
- Electric systems: Third rail, 625 V DC
- Current collection: Contact shoe
- UIC classification: Bo′Bo′ (Note: This pertains to one carriage.)
- AAR wheel arrangement: B-B
- Braking systems: Dynamic braking propulsion system; WABCO RT96 tread brake system; safety brakes
- Safety systems: CBTC, dead man's switch, tripcock
- Headlight type: Incandescent light bulb
- Track gauge: 4 ft 8 1/2 in (1,435 mm) standard gauge

The R143 is a class of New Technology Train subway cars built by Kawasaki Rail Car Company for the New York City Subway's B Division. Delivered between 2001 and 2003, the cars displaced R40s and R42s that operated on the L service in conjunction with the BMT Canarsie Line's signal system being automated.

The R143 was the first "B" Division order of the NTT series, and the first 60-foot (18.29 m) B Division car built for the New York City Subway system since the R42s delivered in 1969. A total of 212 cars were built, all arranged as four-car sets. The first cars (8101–8104) were delivered to the 207th Street Yard on April 30, 2001. 8105–8108 were delivered sometime later in the summer of 2001. The first R143s entered a 30-day period of revenue service testing on December 4, 2001, and officially entered service on the Canarsie Line on February 12, 2002. All cars were delivered by March 2003 with all cars being in service by April 2003.

== Description and features ==
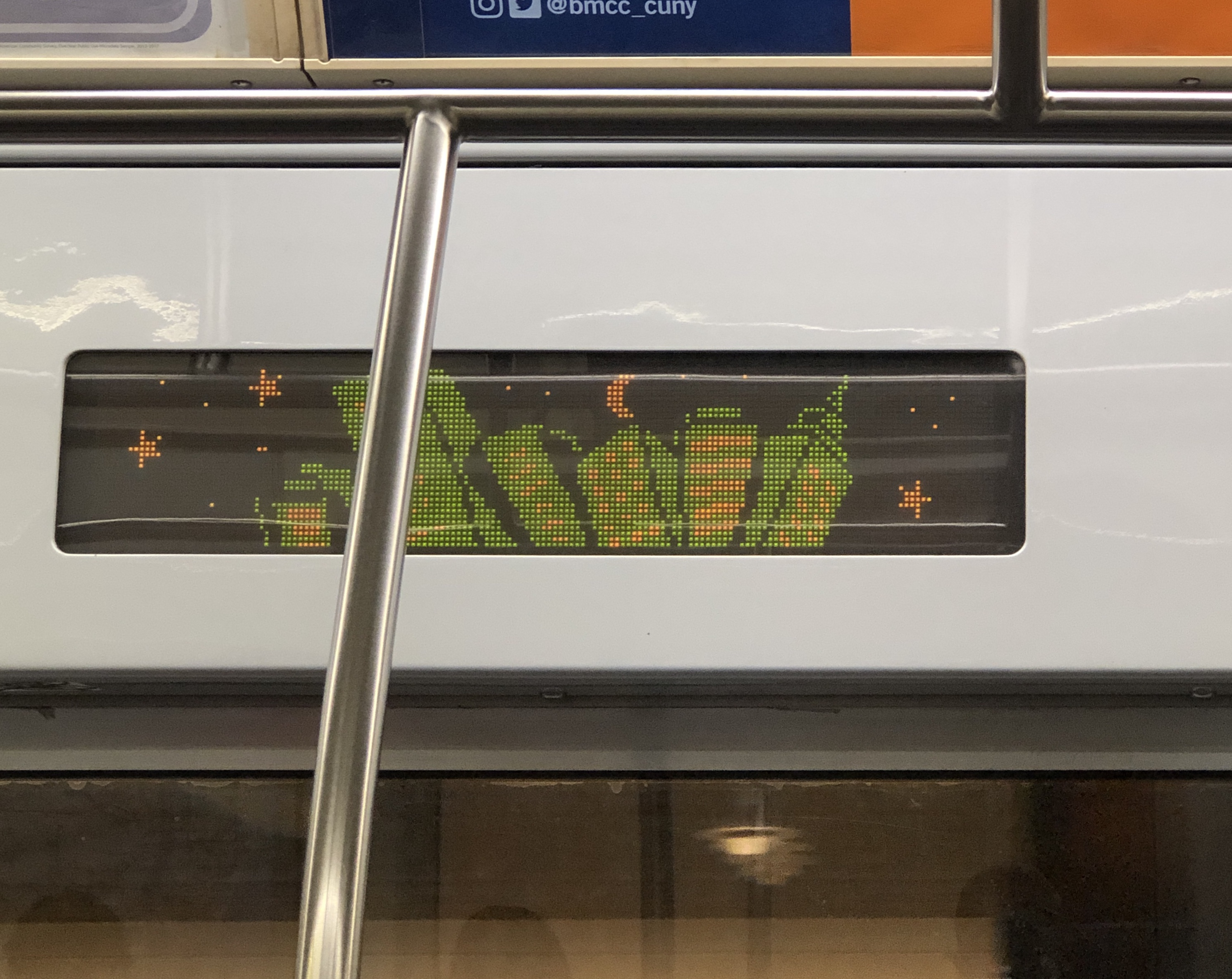
An LED information screen on an R143

The R143s are numbered 8101–8312. The 212 cars were expected to provide enough service for years, but the fast growth of the Williamsburg neighborhood overloaded the L by mid-2006, which resulted in some R160s being placed on the route.

The R143s are the first 60-foot (18.29 m) B Division cars built for the New York City Subway system since the R42 from 1969, the first NTT model for the B Division, and the first automated fleet in the subway system. They are currently based at East New York Yard and assigned to the L. The R143s are very similar to the R160s and R179s, but while the R143s can run with the R160s, both types cannot run with the R179s due to electrical incompatibilities between them.

Like the R142s, R142As, and R188s, the R143s feature electronic strip maps. Originally, they only depicted stops on the L, but since 2020, they were retrofitted to include the J/Z. These newer installations depict the L and J/Z routes using two separate maps side-by-side, using the same 63-light console.

Unlike the rest of the NTT fleet at the time, the R143s are equipped with interior LED screens, which take the place of the MTA Arts for Transit cards that are usually located there. These screens can display advertisements, public safety announcements, and other information. Several cars of the NTT fleet were similarly retrofitted with interior LCD screens (behind the electronic signs on the sides of the trains).

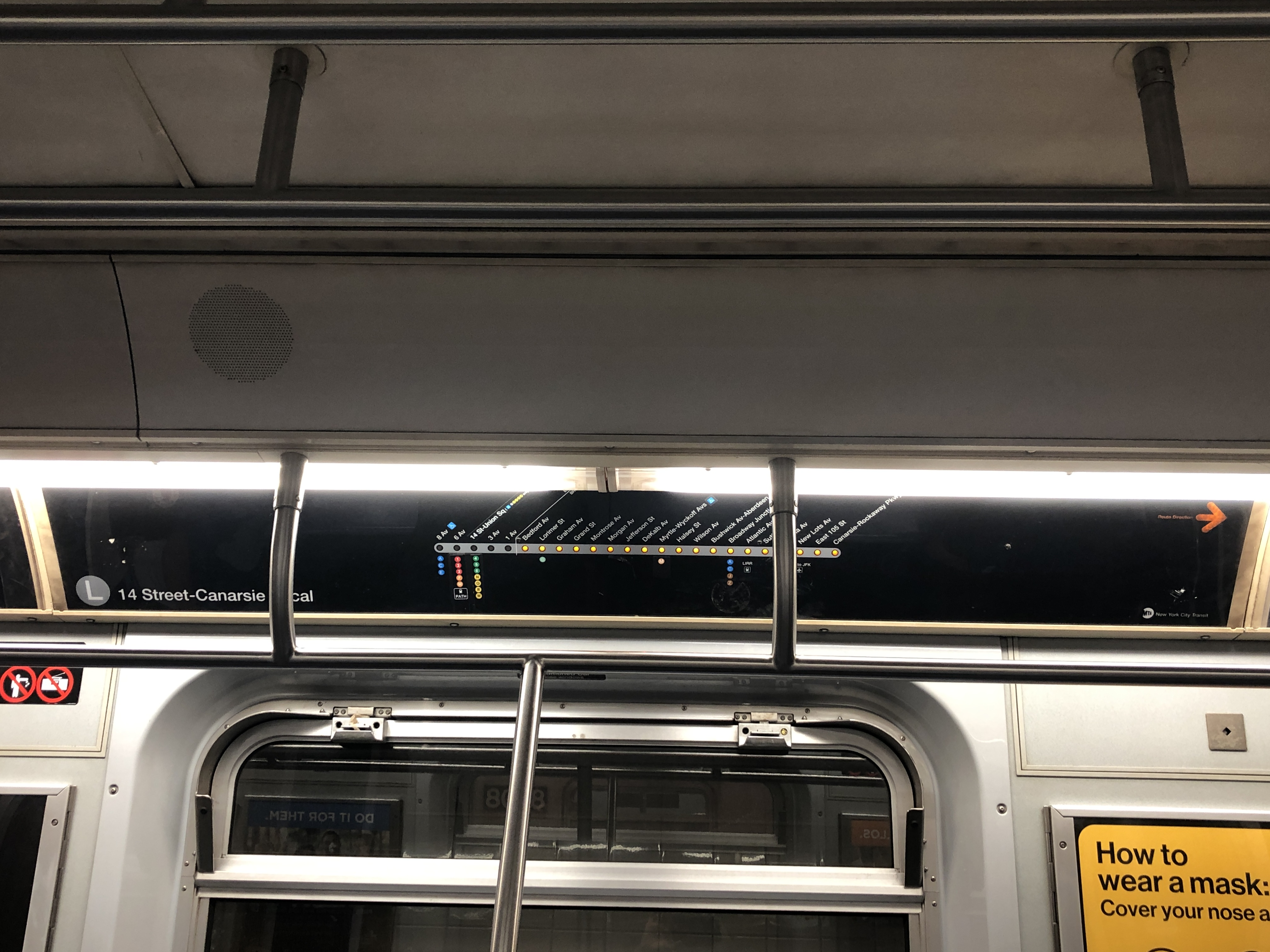
The original electronic strip map on an R143

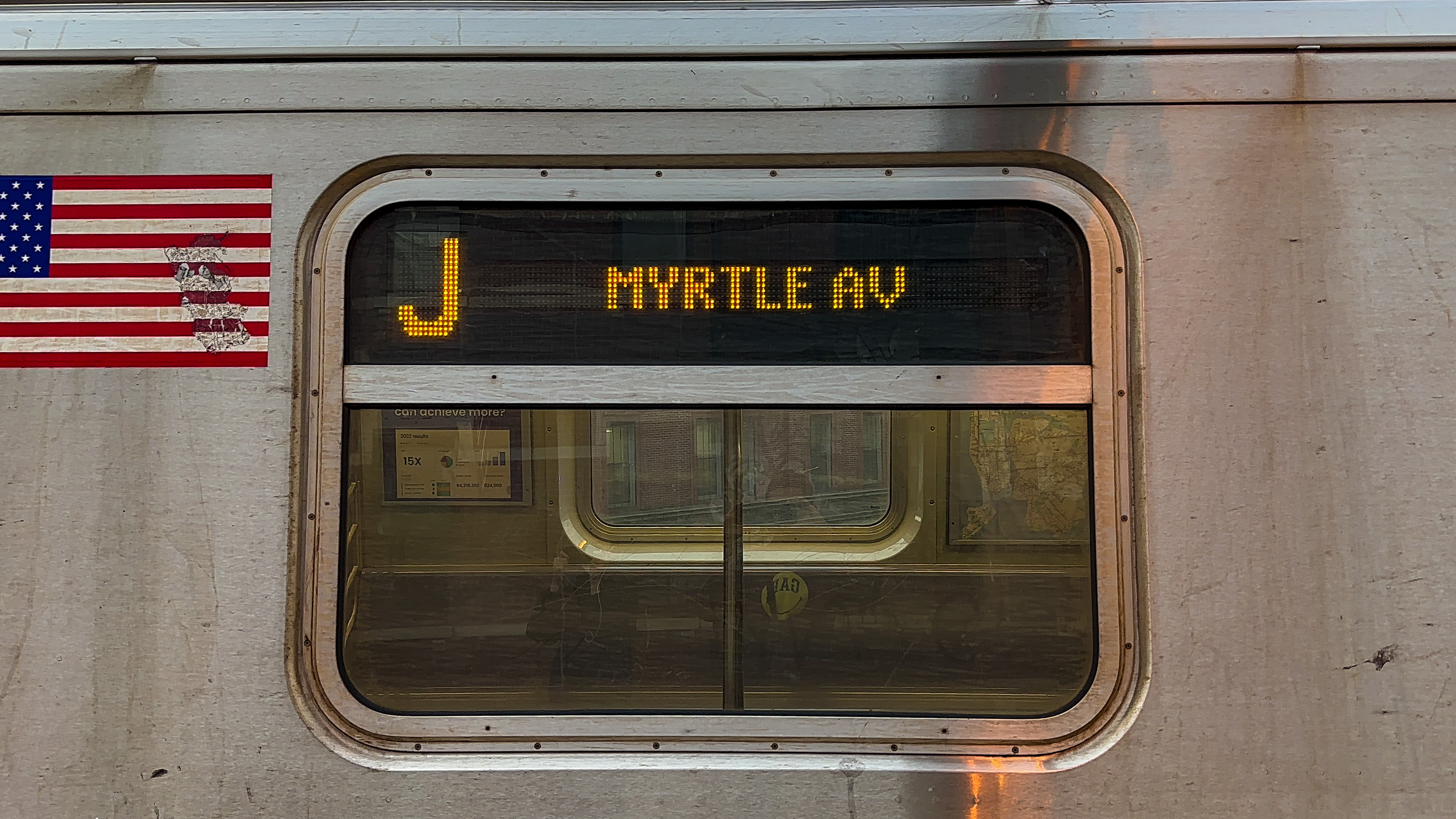
The LED side destination sign of an R143

=== Communications-based train control ===
The Transit Authority had projected that 212 Kawasaki-made R143 subway cars would be enough to accommodate ridership demands for years to come, but ridership has risen higher than expected. Therefore, sixty-four new R160A cars manufactured by Alstom were equipped with CBTC so they could run on the L along with the R143s. The CBTC equipment used in the Canarsie Line cars was manufactured by Siemens Transportation Systems.

== History ==
=== Timeline of contract ===
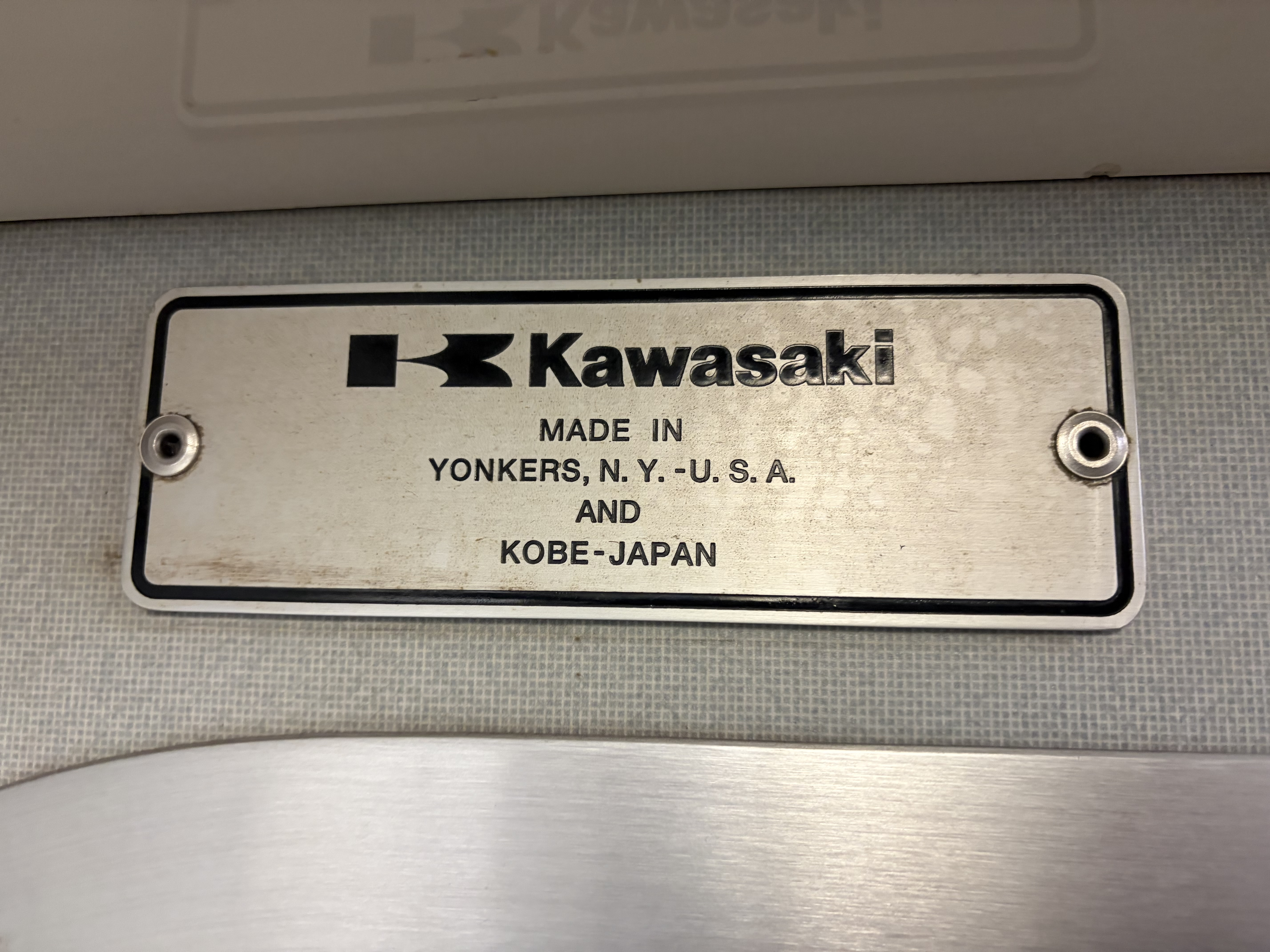
Builders plate of the R143s

The contract for the R143 was put out to tender in January 1998. The initial contract called for 100 60-foot (18.29 m) cars that would come in five-car sets. The new cars would be expected to have automatic PA announcements, high efficiency lighting, emergency intercom and customer alarms, AC propulsion motors, speedometers and event recorders, electronic information display signs, artwork, a central diagnostics monitoring system, microprocessor-controlled air compressor, brake and communication systems, roof-mounted microprocessor-controlled HVAC, and to be compliant with ADA requirements.

Kawasaki Rail Car Company was awarded a $190 million contract for 100 new B Division cars in late December 1998, with an option for 112 more cars. The new design was based on the A Division's R142A, which Kawasaki also built, and incorporated many features from the R110A and R110B prototypes. The cars were built with an average cost of about $1.5 million per car.

=== Delivery ===
Delivery of the cars began in the spring of 2001. A 30-day revenue acceptance testing with one train of eight cars (8101–8108) began on December 4, 2001. According to Kawasaki, the test was "extremely successful". The cars began running on the Canarsie Line (L train) on February 12, 2002, where they have been assigned to. All 212 cars were delivered by March 2003.

Along with displacing older equipment from the Canarsie Line, the R143s also displaced the R42s on the now-extended weekend M shuttle service on the BMT Myrtle Avenue Line, when that line became the first BMT Eastern Division line to be placed in a weekend One Person Train Operation (OPTO) service. The R143s on the M were later displaced by the R160As in February 2008. OPTO service was also tested on the L during mid-2005, but it ended due to safety issues following the London Transport Bombings.

=== Post-delivery ===
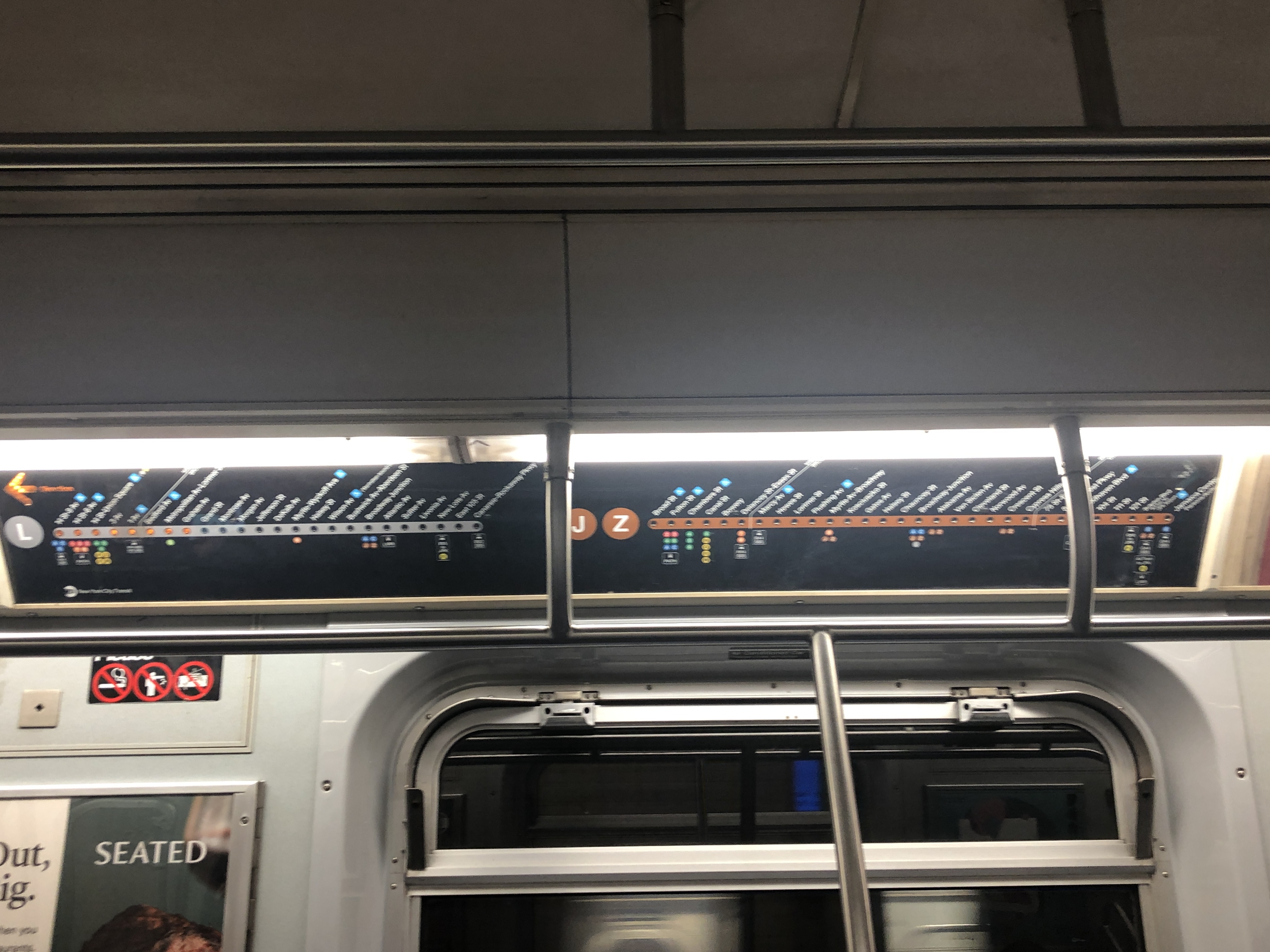
A retrofitted electronic strip map, with both the L and J/Z routes shown

Cars 8205–8212 were originally delivered with experimental Siemens traction systems, similar to, but not identical to, the ones that would be later found in R160B cars 8843–9102. These cars were eventually refitted with the Bombardier traction systems found on all other R143s.

On April 18, 2004, an eight-car R143 train overshot the bumper at Eighth Avenue after the operator suffered a possible seizure. The lead car, 8196, presumably suffered damage while the rest of the consist did not. By 2007, it had been repaired and returned to service.

On June 21, 2006, another eight-car R143 train overshot the bumper, this time at the end of the tracks in the Canarsie Yard after the operator suffered a seizure. The first car, 8277, suffered significant damage and was stripped of damaged parts before being sent to the Kawasaki plant in Yonkers to receive repairs. The other cars in the set (8278–8280) suffered minor body damage and were moved to the 207th Street Yard and repaired. Eventually, 8277 was sent back to New York City Transit property and repaired. By 2016, car 8277 was finally recoupled with 8278–8280, but the consist needed component upgrades to become operational. The set returned to service on December 11, 2017.

In 2017, a set of R143s was equipped with measuring gauges to test out the curve radius and gangway flex in the existing 60-foot (18.29 m)-long cars in order to collect data for evaluating the R211T order, which began running in revenue service on February 1, 2024.

In September 2020, the interior strip maps for these cars, which originally only depicted stops on the L route, were replaced with combined strip maps that includes stops on both the J/Z and L services.
