= WMUA =

Radio station at University of Massachusetts Amherst

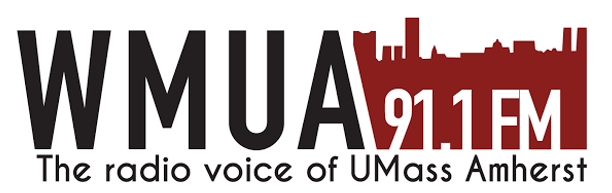
- Amherst, Massachusetts; United States
- Broadcast area: Pioneer Valley
- Frequency: 91.1 MHz

Programming
- Format: College radio

Ownership
- Owner: University of Massachusetts Amherst; (University of Massachusetts)

History
- Founded: 1949 as carrier current AM
- First air date: 1952
- Call sign meaning: Massachusetts University - Amherst

Technical information
- Licensing authority: FCC
- Facility ID: 69184
- Class: A
- ERP: 450 watts
- HAAT: 39 meters (128 ft)
- Transmitter coordinates: 42°23′37.97″N 72°31′17.9″W

Links
- Public license information: Public file; LMS
- Webcast: Listen live
- Website: wmua.org

WMUA (91.1 FM) is a student-run college radio station owned by the University of Massachusetts Amherst in Amherst, Massachusetts. The station's broadcast license is held by the University of Massachusetts. WMUA celebrated its 70th anniversary of continuous on-air broadcasting during the 2017-2018 school year. The station debuted a second, online-only stream called WMUAx in September 2017.

WMUA was established in 1948 originally as an AM station. Though it is run by undergraduates, the station's program hosts includes faculty members, university staff members, community volunteers, and graduate students.

WMUA is broadcast to the Connecticut River Valley, including western Massachusetts, northern Connecticut, and southern Vermont. The station is federally licensed (authorized by the FCC) and non-commercial, and is under the supervision of the UMass Board of Trustees.

WMUA's studio is located in the basement of the Lincoln Campus Center building. The actual transmitter and antenna are located on Observatory Way, between the Orchard Hill and Sylvan Residential living areas. This facility, activated at midnight on January 1, 2004, is WMUA's third transmission site; it originally transmitted from atop Marston Hall, and then on Emily Dickinson Dormitory. The Dickinson Dormitory tower in Orchard Hill served as a backup until a re-roofing project took it down in 2011; it is licensed as a backup facility, and rebuilding the backup was completed on June 30, 2014. The station is a licensed "class A" broadcast facility. WMUA is tentatively slated to move to a new facility in fall 2020, as part of the UMass Student Union Renovation Project.

== Programming ==
WMUA's programming philosophy is to provide listeners with an eclectic experience unique to the UMass and Pioneer Valley region the station serves. In addition to music programming, there are talk shows, sports shows, and student-produced newscasts every weekday at 5:30 p.m. WMUA broadcasts 24/7/365 and is available online on WMUA's website. The station has a second, online-only stream called WMUAx that can be accessed on the station's website. WMUAx is non-FCC regulated, and plays additional WMUA content as well as select sports games.

WMUA provides an outlet for multiple opinions to be expressed through music, political and advocacy talk, and public service announcements.

== Sports ==
WMUA is the flagship radio station of UMass Minutewomen basketball as well as both UMass Minutemen lacrosse and UMass Minutewomen lacrosse. They also broadcast other UMass Minutemen sports including ice hockey, men's basketball, baseball, and football throughout the year. Since 2018 all WMUA Sports productions have been broadcast from the Dave Strader Memorial Sports Studio, named to honor the WMUA alum following his passing.

WMUA Sports produces online podcasts covering a wide range of topics around sports. Podcasts include Chatting 300 (baseball), Intentionally Foul (NBA and fantasy basketball), Bracketville (bracket-style game show on the bests and worsts in the world of sports), From the Peanut Gallery (WMUA's own version of "First Take"), Cover Four (college football), Four-Point Play (college basketball) and Goal Line Stand (NFL).

== News ==
WMUA News is one of the nation's last remaining daily student-run news broadcasts. Broadcasting during the academic year, it focuses on international, national, and local news. All on-air content is hosted, produced, and scripted by students.

== Notable alumni ==
- Marc Bertrand - radio talk show host on WBZ-FM, 98.5 "The Sports Hub" in Boston
- Dylan Brewer - Founder at FRAUDULENT, former VP of Marketing, Head of Experiential for Epic Records
- Mike Corey - Play-by-play Sportscaster for ESPN and NBC for College Football, Basketball, Lacrosse and NBC's Olympics Coverage.
- Audie Cornish - Anchor and correspondent for CNN, former NPR correspondent
- Lisa Creamer - WBUR Managing Editor, Digital
- George Knight - Morning Show host on WERS in Boston.
- David Ginsburg - General Manager of WICN in Worcester, Massachusetts.
- Annie Dooley - On-Air Personality in Salisbury, Maryland.
- Bennett Karoll - Associate Producer for SiriusXM Fantasy in Washington, D.C.
- Charlie Pellett - Bloomberg radio personality and "stand clear of the closing doors" voice on New York City Subway
- Matt Perrault - Host of "Game Night with Matt Perrault," SB Nation Radio
- Mike Reiss - ESPN NFL Nation reporter covering the New England Patriots, Reporter and analyst for ESPNBoston.com.
- Dave Strader - Former NHL play-by-play announcer for NHL on NBC and NHL on NBC Sports Network
- J. Kyle White-Sullivan - WBUR Product Manager

== See also ==
- Campus radio
- List of college radio stations in the United States
