= Charlie Pellett =

News anchor for Bloomberg Radio

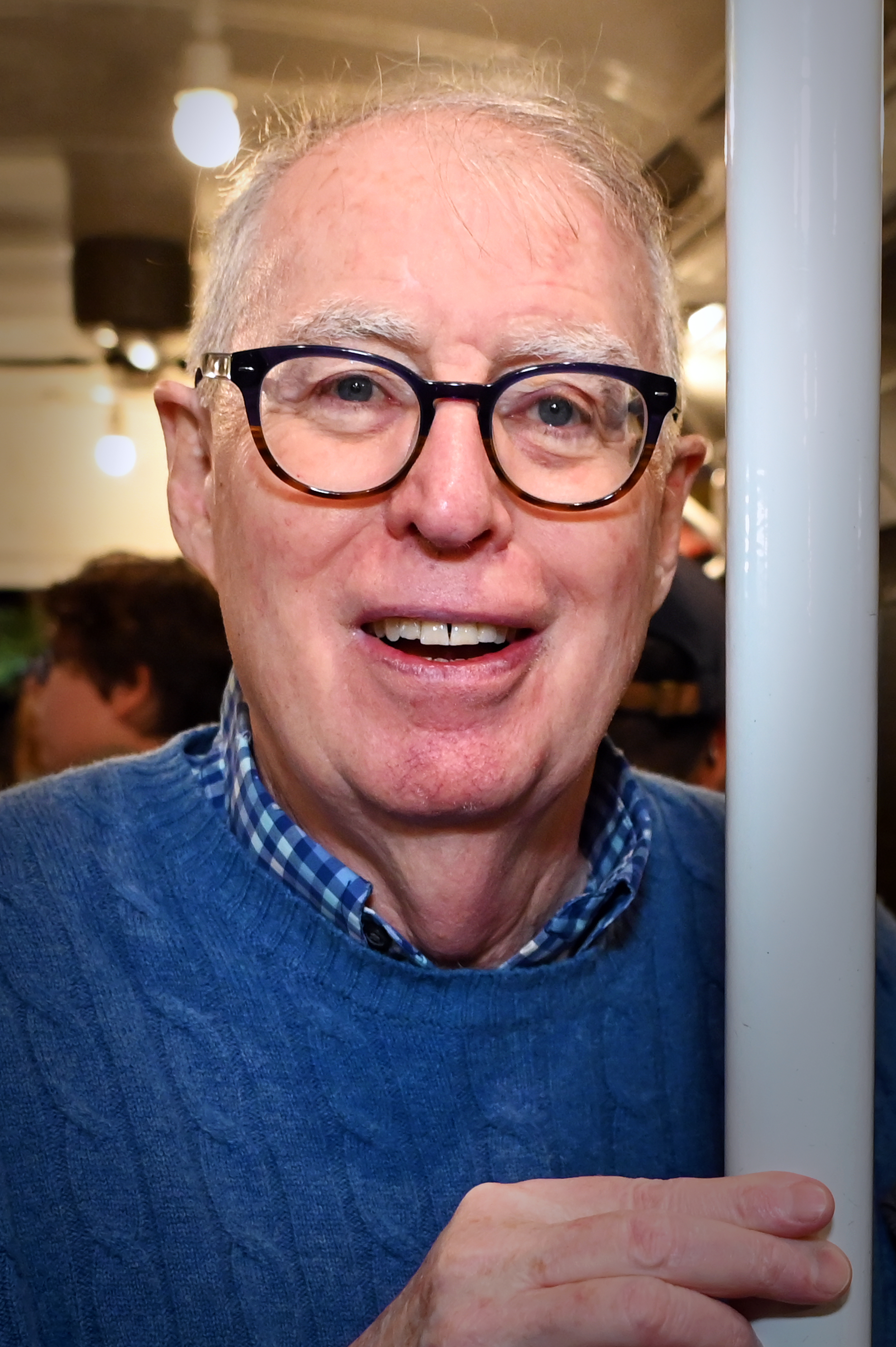
- Pellett in 2025
- Born: January 27, 1956 (age 70); London, England
- Occupations: Broadcaster, news anchor

Charlie Pellett (born January 27, 1956) is an English-born American news anchor for Bloomberg Radio. He is known for voicing announcements on the New York City Subway including the famous "stand clear of the closing doors please" announcement on New Technology Trains.

Pellett is one of several voice artists used on New York City public transportation announcements, including Bernie Wagenblast as well as several other Bloomberg journalists whose contributions to the NTT trains Michael Bloomberg requested. Pellett appeared, as himself, "the voice of the New York subway system" on an episode of Conan O’Brien’s late night show Conan in 2017. Video of the segment where O'Brien elicits phrases from Pellett in his broadcasting voice is available on Team Coco’s Youtube. His resonant voice has also led to him being featured on pop group AJR’s double platinum single, "Bang", voicing "Here we go!" in the song's chorus.

Although he was raised in London, Pellett practiced using an American accent by listening to radio broadcasts. In the 1960s, Pellett and his family lived in Beirut, Lebanon, where his father was a professor at the American University of Beirut. He would often communicate via radio. His on-air voice is iconic and regionally unmarked; later train announcements were supplemented by voices with more regional New York accents.

Pellett has presented on Bloomberg Radio since 1992. He gives business reports and stock market updates. He studied communication at University of Massachusetts. After he graduated, he hosted a call-in show for former New York City mayor Ed Koch and was the financial reporter for Seattle's KING-TV newscast.
