= New Technology Train =

Family of New York City Subway cars

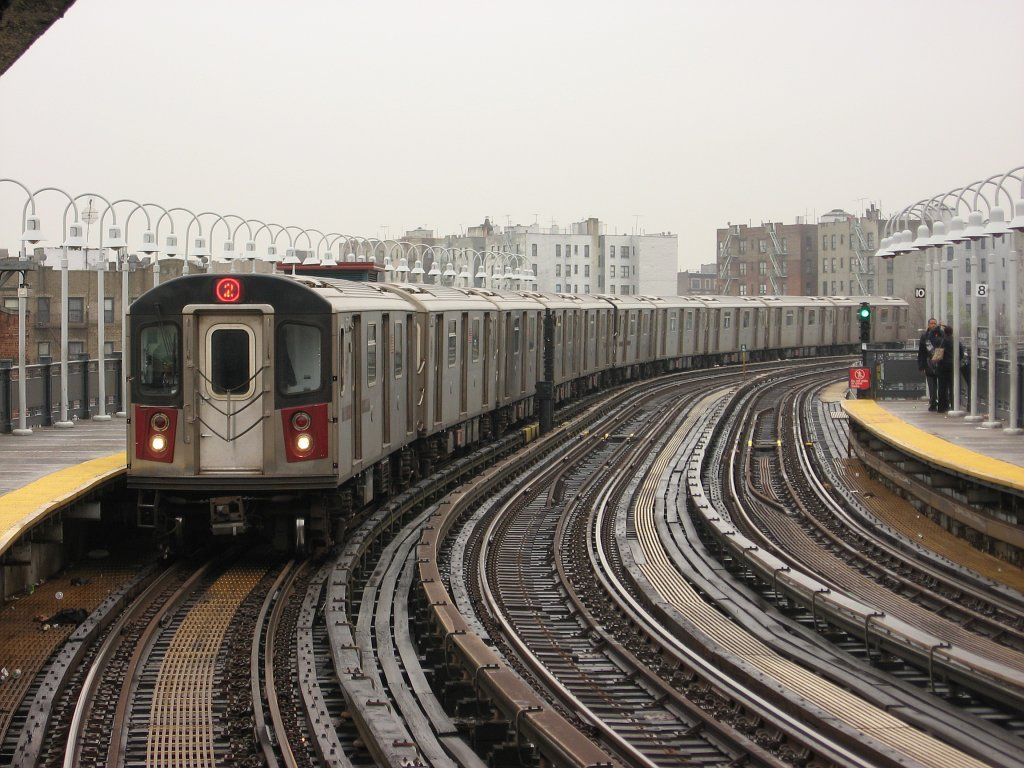
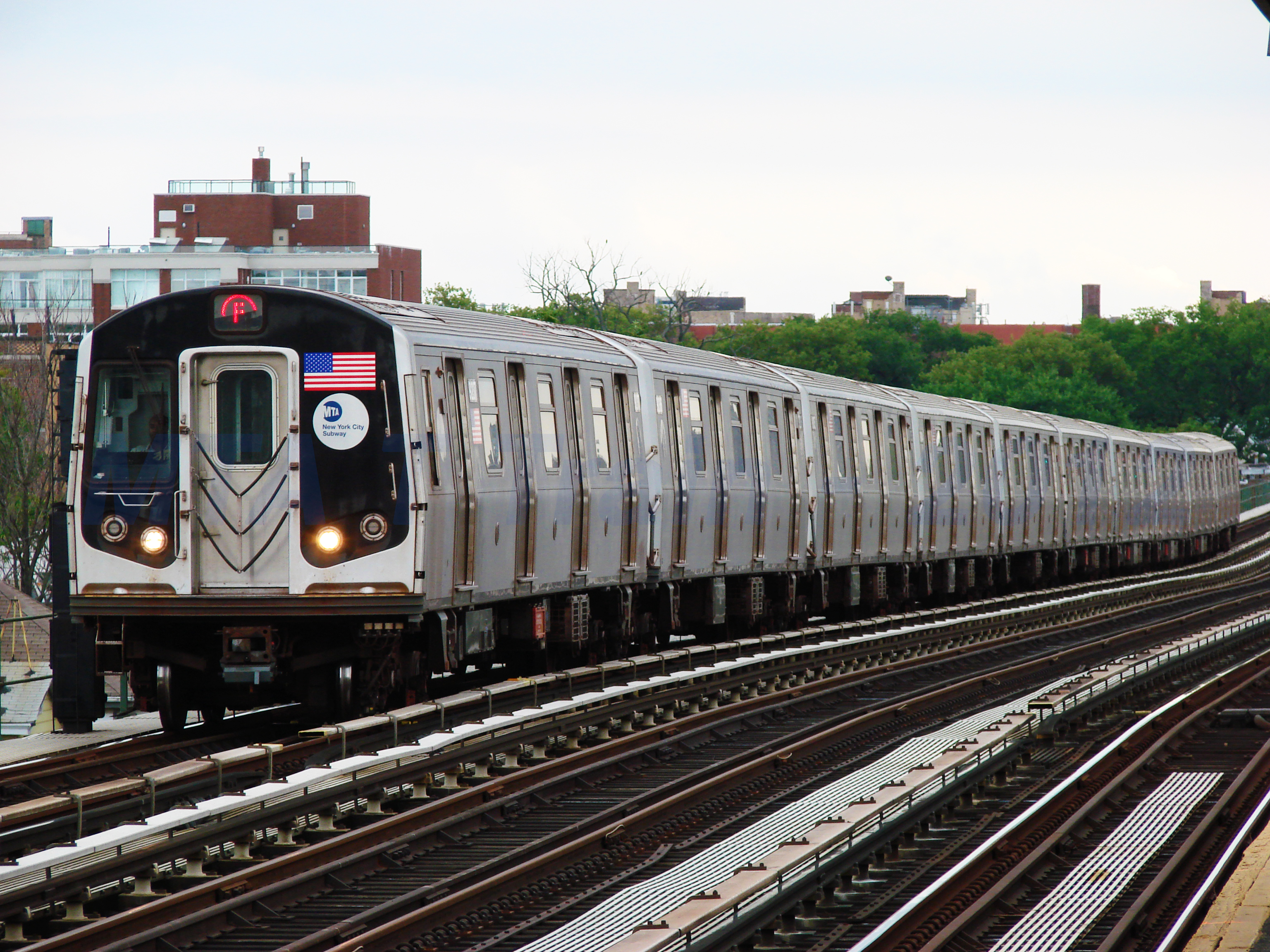
The typical first-generation NTT car design for the A Division (top; an R142, on the 2) and B Division (bottom; an R160, on the F)

New Technology Train (NTT) is the collective term for the modern passenger fleet of the New York City Subway that has entered service since the turn of the 21st century. This series includes the current R142, R142A, R143, R160, R179, R188 and R211 models, along with the planned R262 and R268 models. Two prototypes, the R110A and R110B, were used to test the features that would be found on all NTTs today.

Sometimes referred to as New Millennium Trains, they are known for improvements in technology, energy efficiency, reliability, and comfort along with advanced passenger information systems. All of these trains are capable of operating with communications-based train control (CBTC)—which can allow for automatic train controls and compatibility with updated signal systems—and either already have CBTC or are scheduled to be retrofitted with the system. Much of the engineering and construction efforts for the fleet have been done by Kawasaki Heavy Industries and Bombardier Transportation, with Alstom also participating in the construction of the R160 fleet.

== List of New Technology Trains ==
This is a list of all NTTs operated by the New York City Subway, as well as future trains and retired trains of the MTA.

=== Current ===
- R142 – Built by Bombardier Transportation. The first production model of NTTs. Built for the A Division. Entered service on July 10, 2000. Assigned to the 2, 4, and 5 routes. The R142s are similar to the R142As and the R188s. Replaced the A Division Redbirds.
- R142A – Built by Kawasaki Rail Car Company. Used by the A Division. Also entered service on July 10, 2000, the same day the R142s entered service. 380 cars converted into R188s. 220 cars remain unconverted, and are currently assigned to the 4. The R142As are similar to the R142s and nearly identical to the R188s. Replaced the A Division Redbirds.
- R143 – Built by Kawasaki Rail Car Company. The first model of NTTs for the B Division, assigned to the L and J/Z. Entered service on February 12, 2002. Equipped with CBTC, the first subway car to be equipped with this feature. The R143s are similar to the R160s and R179s.
- R160 – Built by Alstom and Kawasaki Rail Car Company. Used by the B Division. There are two subtypes since these cars were built by two different manufacturers. R160As were built by Alstom, while R160Bs were built by Kawasaki. The R160Bs entered service on August 17, 2006, while the R160As entered service on October 16, 2006. Currently, the R160s are assigned to the E, F, J/Z, L, M, and R routes. 17 four-car sets have CBTC for the L. An additional 309 sets, configured in four and five-car sets, will be equipped with CBTC for the IND Queens Boulevard Line, which the E, F, M, and R routes run on. The R160s are similar to the R143s and R179s; however, none of them are interchangeable. Replaced all R38s, R40s, and NYCT R44s, along with most R32s and R42s.
- R188 – Built by the Kawasaki Rail Car Company. The R188s entered service on December 15, 2013. They are used exclusively on the 7 route of the A Division, and thus is grouped in eleven-car trains, and are CBTC equipped. The order consists of 380 converted R142A cars and of 126 identical newly built cars. The R188s are similar to the R142s in addition to being nearly identical to the R142As.
- R179 – Built by Bombardier Transportation. Used by the B Division. The first car to be delivered, numbered 3014, arrived at 207th Street Yard on September 6, 2016. The R179s entered service on December 27, 2017. All cars were delivered by the end of December 2019. Currently, the R179s are assigned to the A, C, M, Rockaway Park Shuttle, and J/Z routes. The R179s are similar to the R160s and R143s. Replaced all remaining R32s and R42s.
- R211 – Built by Kawasaki Rail Car Company. The first NTT model with a redesigned appearance. R211As and R211Ts are used by the B Division and R211Ss are used by the Staten Island Railway. 20 cars are open-gangway experimental prototype cars. As of 2026, the R211s are assigned to the A, B, C, D, G, and Rockaway Park Shuttle routes, in addition to the Staten Island Railway. Will also have Wi-Fi, security cameras, digital video screens, and electronic charging stations. The R211 introduces a new exterior and interior not present on previous NTT orders. Will replace all SIR R44s and R46s, along with some R68 cars.

=== Future ===
- R262 – Will be used by the A Division. Will be equipped with communications-based train control and Ethernet systems. May include open gangways. Manufacturer has not been announced. Will replace all R62s and R62As, may replace R142s and R142As if options are picked up.
- R268 – Will be used by the B Division. Will be equipped with communications-based train control. Will use the design of the R211 fleet. To replace all R68As and all remaining R68s. Being built by Kawasaki Rail Car.

=== Retired ===
- R110A – Contract number was R130. Built by Kawasaki Rail Car Company and used mainly on the 2 route. Was a prototype train for the A Division that operated from 1993 to 1999. Used to test out new technology features that would be incorporated into the R142 car order. Was not intended for long-term production use. All B-cars of the set were converted into pump cars between 2013 and 2014. All A-cars set to be converted in the future.
- R110B – Contract number was R131. Built by Bombardier Transportation and used mainly on the A route. Also ran on the C route for final years in service. Was a prototype train for the B Division that operated from 1993 to 2000. Designed to test various new technology features that would eventually be incorporated into the R143 car order and was also not intended for long-term production use. Five cars were sent away and repurposed, while three cars remain at 207th Street Yard. In 2025, car 3007 was placed on display inside the New York Transit Museum.

== History ==
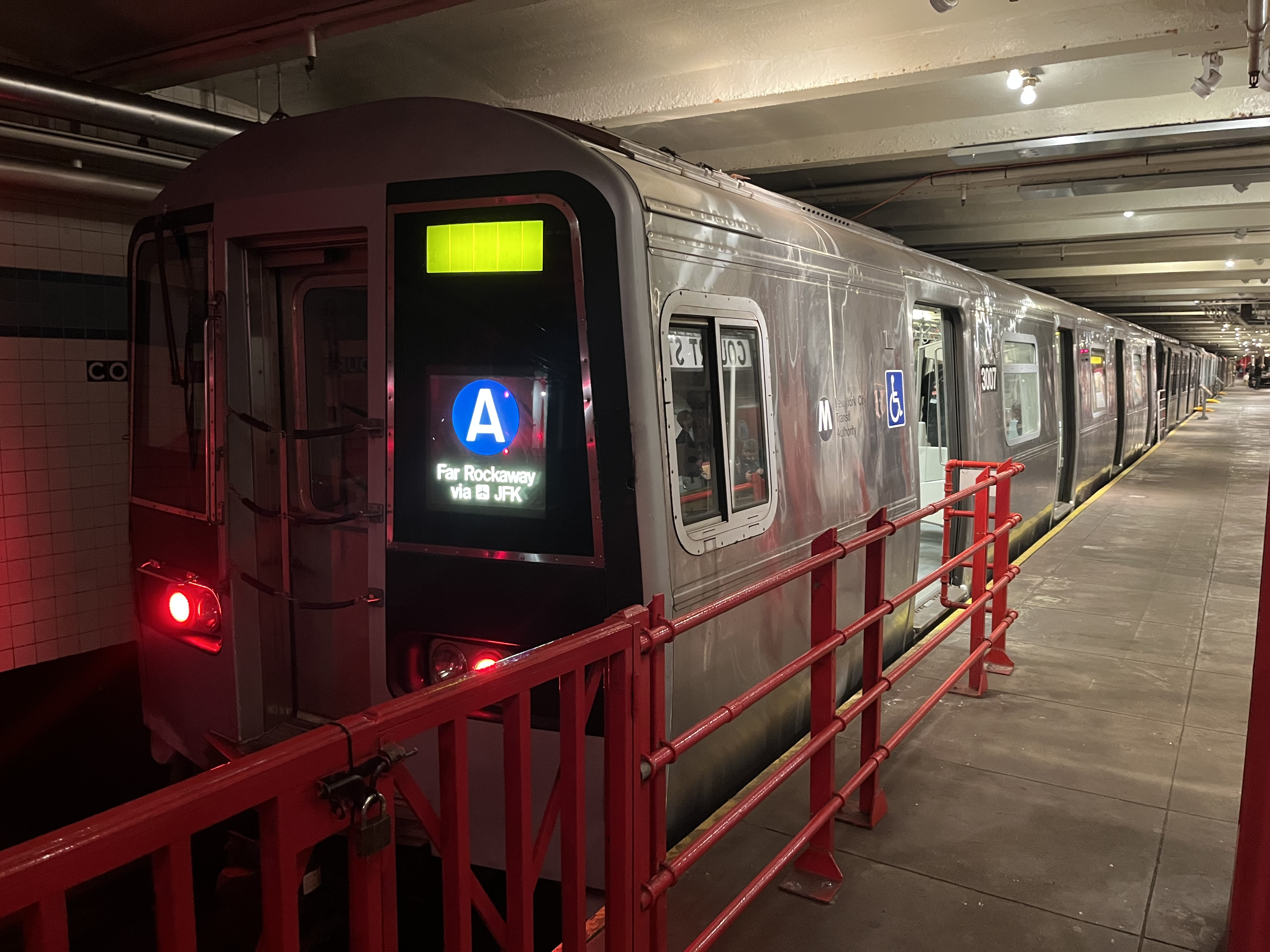
R110B car 3007, the B Division NTT prototype, on display at the New York Transit Museum

The New Technology program emerged from modernization efforts by the Metropolitan Transportation Authority (MTA) beginning in 1982, when the subway "was on the verge of collapse". The New Technology program officially began in 1988, the first effort at a technologically advanced subway car since the R44 in the early 1970s. In 1989, the MTA awarded contracts for two prototype test trains: the R110A (contract R130) for the A Division built by Kawasaki Heavy Industries, and the R110B (contract R131) for the B Division built by Bombardier Transportation. The two New Technology test trains (NTTTs) began service in June 1993, testing features that would be implemented on future mass-production orders. Both trains were taken out of service by 2000, due to multiple issues with the trains.

In 1997, the first mass order of New Technology trains was placed for the R142 and R142A trains of the A Division (awarded to Bombardier and Kawasaki respectively), in order to replace the final 1,410 Redbird cars in operation. In 1998, a smaller contract of 212 cars, consisting of 100 in the base order and 112 in the optional order, was awarded to Kawasaki Heavy Industries, to build the R143 model for the B Division's BMT Eastern Division (primarily the BMT Canarsie Line's L train). The first R142s and R142As entered service beginning in July 2000. The R143s began operation in February 2002.

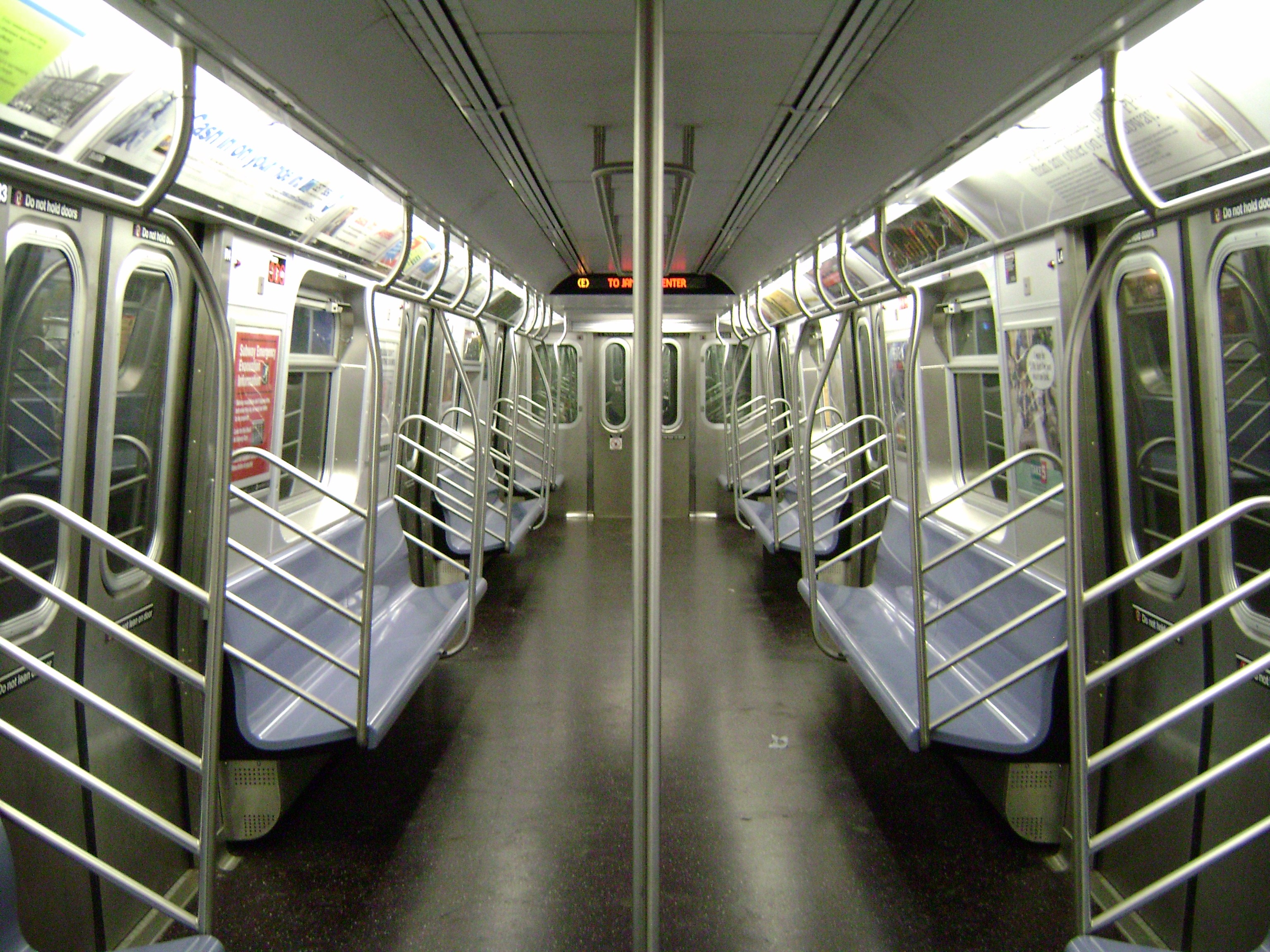
The interior of a R160A in 2010 on an E train

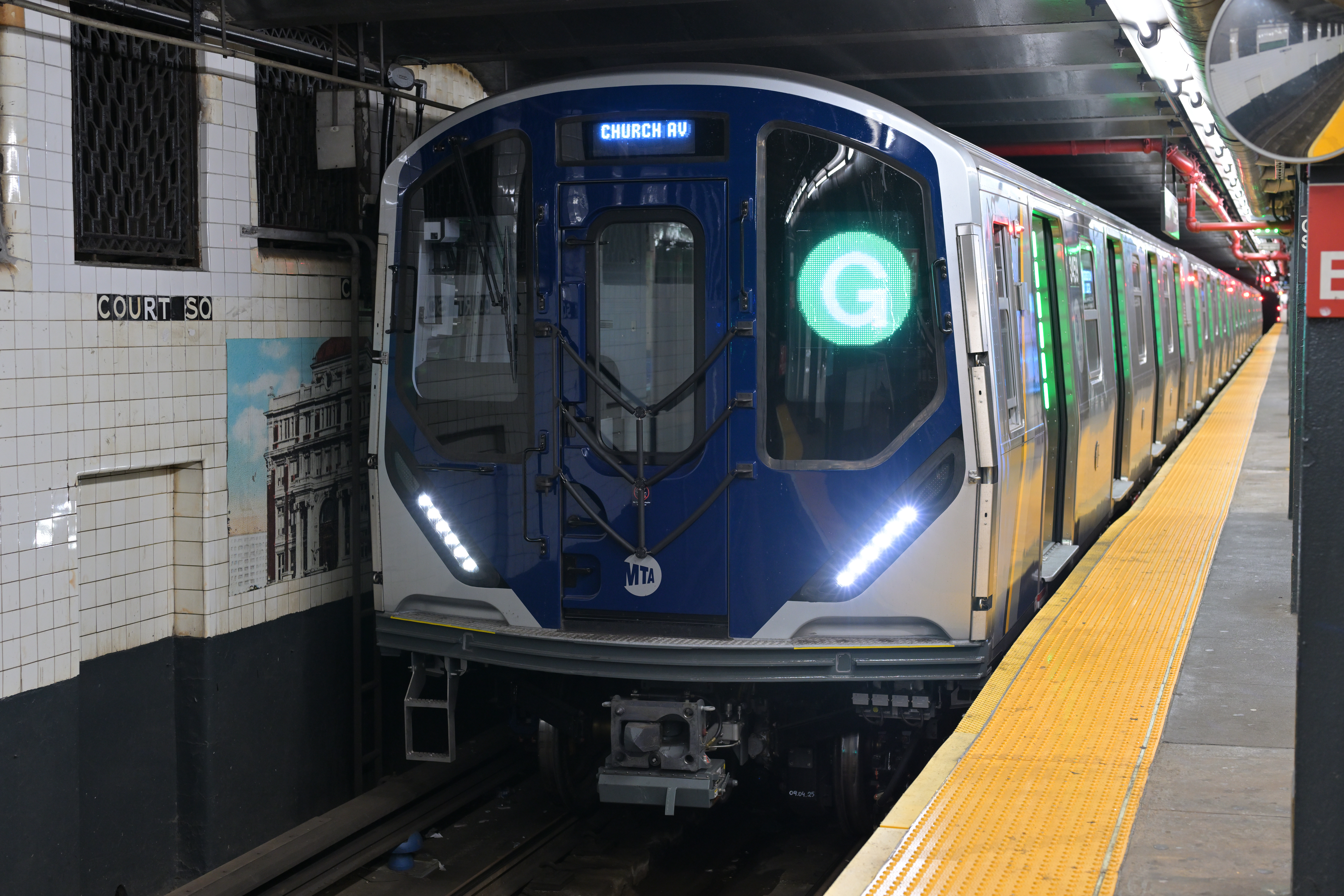
A R211A G train at Court Square station, showcasing the new exterior appearance.

In July 2002, the MTA awarded contracts to Kawasaki and Alstom for the R160 order for the B Division, with options for up to 1,700 cars to replace many 1960s- and 1970s-era cars. The first R160 train, built by Kawasaki under the contract R160B, began service on August 17, 2006, on the N. The initial 660-car base order was filled by October 2008, with a total of 1,662 cars delivered by May 6, 2010.

On May 5, 2010, Kawasaki was awarded the contract for the R188 A Division order, to provide 46 CBTC-ready 11-car trains for the IRT Flushing Line (7 and <7> trains). Unlike the other orders, the R188 constructed only 126 new subway cars, with the remaining 380 cars consisting of converted R142As. The first R188s entered service on November 9, 2013.

On June 4, 2012, Bombardier was awarded the R179 contract for 300 new B Division cars, to replace the 50 R42s on the BMT Jamaica Line (J and Z trains). In December 2012, preliminary designs began on the R211 B Division contract, which entails 940 cars in order to expand the system fleet, and to replace the R46 fleet, and the R44 fleet of the Staten Island Railway; both models were built in the 1970s. Both the R179 and R211 orders were supposed to replace the 222 remaining R32 cars, which were built in the 1960s and have run well past their expected lives, by the year 2022., however, in January 2020, it was decided that the R179 fleet was to replace all remaining R32s. The R179 order fell significantly behind schedule, with the first test train delivered in September 2016.

On January 19, 2018, the MTA Board suggested that Kawasaki Rail Car Corp., a subsidiary of Kawasaki Heavy Industries, be awarded the $3.7 billion base order for the first 535 new R211 cars. The cars are anticipated to be delivered from 2020 to 2023, with the option orders to be delivered by 2025. The R211 base order includes 20 R211T cars with open gangways; 75 R211S cars for the Staten Island Railway, to be delivered near the end of the base order; and 440 cars similar to the R143/R160 series, operating in five-car units. The cars will be assembled at Kawasaki's factories in Lincoln, Nebraska, and Yonkers, New York. After multiple delays, the first test train was delivered in July 2021, with the production cars being delivered between 2021 and 2023. On March 10, 2023, the R211As were placed into revenue service on the A for a 30-day in-service acceptance test. The R211Ts began running on the C train on February 1, 2024, and the first R211S train began running on the Staten Island Railway on October 8, 2024.

In January 2019, the MTA announced that the R262s would be replacing the R62 and R62A fleets, a new fleet that would be ordered as part of a future capital program. In June 2023, the MTA hinted towards the existence of the R268 subway car contract but did not divulge further details.

On September 5, 2025, the MTA issued a sole source advertisement for 378 R268 cars from Kawasaki Railcar Manufacturing using the design of the R211 fleet. The earliest award date for the contract was listed as September 29, 2025. The order would consist of 290 cars in five-car units and 88 cars in four-car units. On October 29, 2025, it was announced that Kawasaki Railcar Manufacturing will build the cars for an estimated $1.5 billion.

== Design and features ==
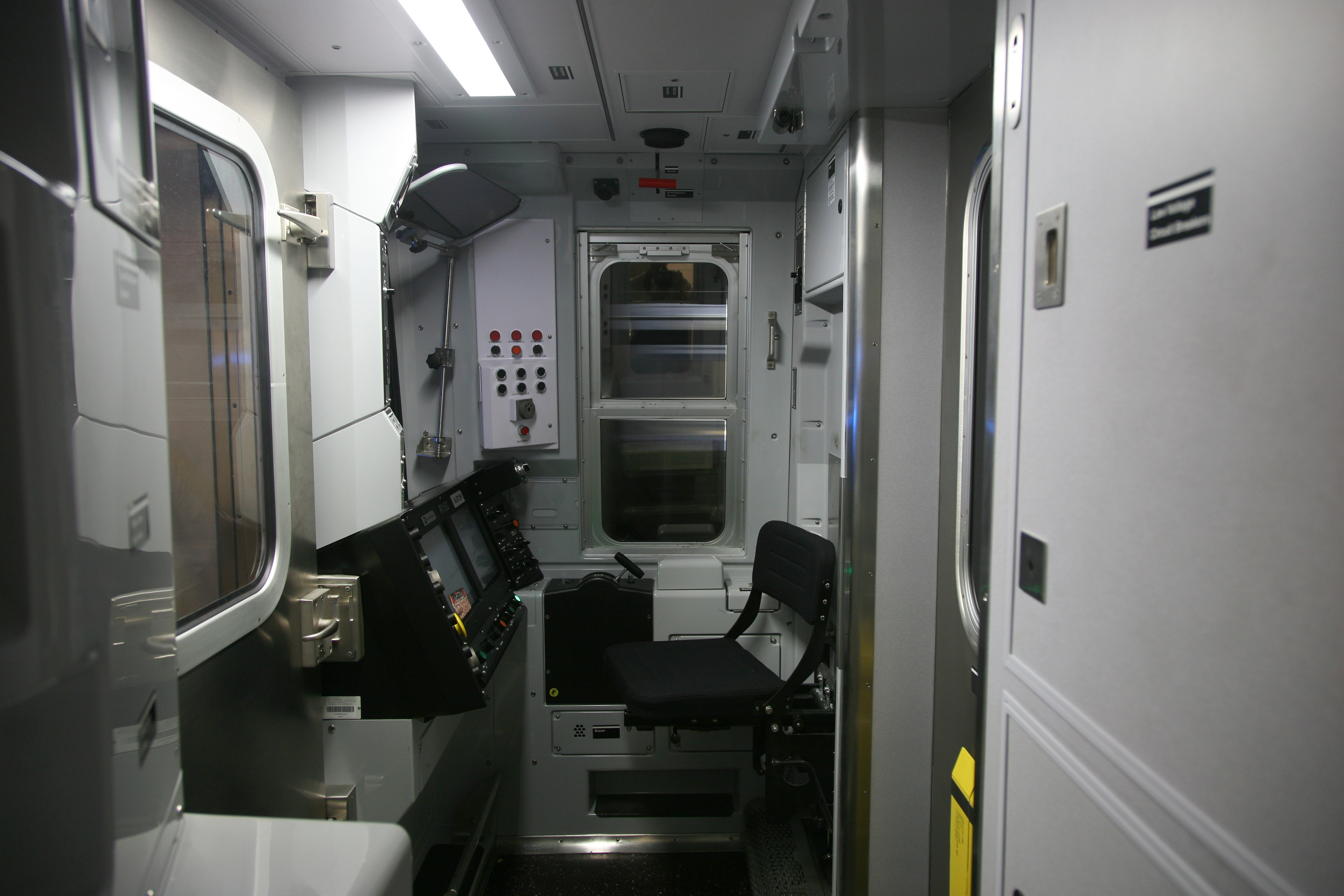
A driver's cab of a R160A subway car on an N train

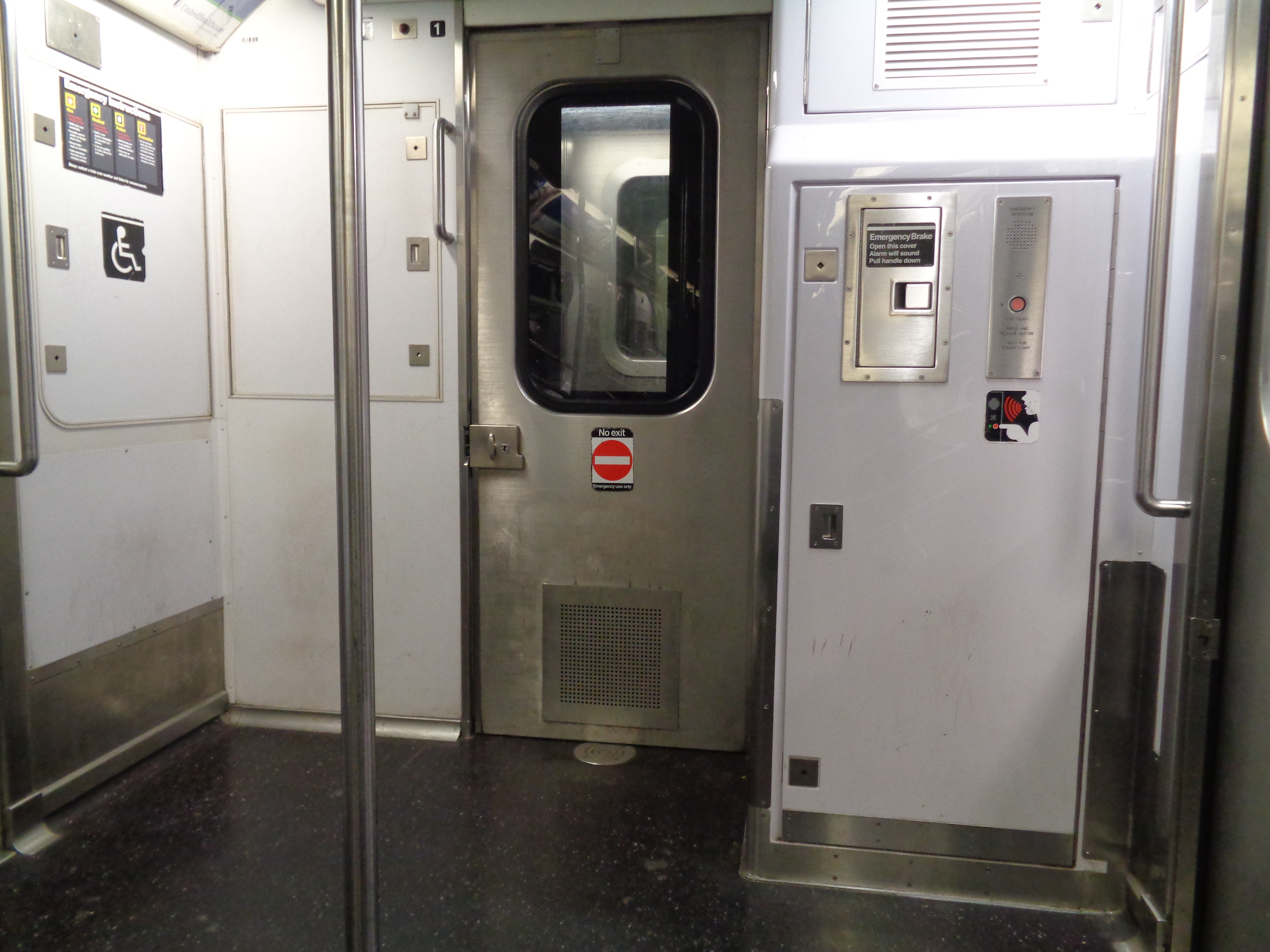
A DCS (right) for communications-based train control (CBTC) installed on a R188 car in 7 service

The NTT models utilize a common car design; stainless-steel car bodies with a black (blue on the R211) front fascia on the "A" (cab) cars, open lexan-glass windows on non-cab ends allowing passengers to see through to the next car, and electronic outer route signs, as opposed to the rollsigns used by previous models. Improvements to the conductors' interface include the addition of speedometers as well as electronic consoles that monitor mechanical problems that may occur on the train. The cars feature a white fiberglass interior with blue-gray plastic bench seats both to combat vandalism, along with bright fluorescent lighting and LED interior passenger information signs. The bench-style seats, designed with lumbar supports, also replaced the bucket-style seats used on rolling stock built in the 1970s and '80s, which were uncomfortable for some passengers and harder to clean. The trains utilize an airbag suspension (replacing conventional springs) for a more comfortable ride, and employ regenerative braking which converts the energy from brake application into electricity that is fed back into the third rail.

All NTTs are capable of being equipped with communications-based train control (CBTC) technology, which is installed in the "A" cars behind the train operator's cab. Until the late 2010s, only the R143s and R188s, as well as sixty-eight R160As, had been upgraded for automated service on the L and 7 routes. During the late 2010s and early 2020s, most of the remaining R160s were also retrofitted with CBTC. One of MTA’s newest trains, the R211T has what is called Open Gangways which allow for passengers to pass through cars without having to get out the train and switch. All existing cars in the R142 and R142A fleets and future cars in the R211 and R262 fleets will also be equipped with CBTC in the future.

=== Recorded announcements ===
The NTTs are the first rolling stock in the system to utilize pre-recorded train announcements, as opposed to live announcements from conductors. The recorded announcements are used for station information, closing doors, and other general messages. Station announcements rely on a wheel-rotation counter to make accurate stop announcements. The recordings began in the late 1990s and feature Bloomberg Radio on-air speakers, who volunteered at the request of their employer Michael Bloomberg, who would later become mayor of New York City. Voices include Dianne Thompson (for the 1, 2, and 3 and 9 (discontinued in 2005) trains), Melissa Kleiner (original voice of the 4 and 5 trains outside of Manhattan), Jessica Ettinger Gottesman (current voice for the 4, 5, and 6 trains), Annie Bergen (for the 7 train and 42nd Street Shuttle), Catherine Cowdery (for the B, D, E, G, J, L, M, N, Q, R, V (discontinued in 2010), W, and Z trains), Kathleen Campion (for the A, C, and F trains, as well as the Franklin Avenue Shuttle and Rockaway Park Shuttle), and Charlie Pellett (for other announcements). Since 2018, Velina Mitchell has also done some of the announcements formerly performed by Pellett, particularly informational messages and station accessibility information. In recent years, owing to changes in routes, transfers and station names, most trains tend to mix-and-match voices with others initially assigned to other routes.

Female voices are typically used for station, route, and transfer/connection announcements, although Pellett announces the majority of the transfers on the A Division instead of the female voices. Pellett's recordings are used for most of the remaining announcements, most notably "Stand clear of the closing doors, please" before train doors closing, but also for safety announcements such as "Please be careful of the gap between the platform and the train" before entering a station with curved platforms, and "If you see something, say something." With regard to why certain messages are voiced by males and others by females, MTA spokesperson Gene Sansone said in 2006, "Most of the orders are given by a male voice, while informational messages come from females. Even though this happened by accident, it is a lucky thing because a lot of psychologists agree that people are more receptive to orders from men and information from women." Manual announcements can still be made over the public address system by train operators and conductors.

In January 2020, as part of an agreement between the MTA and Comedy Central to promote actress Awkwafina's TV show Nora From Queens, the default pre-recorded announcements for the 7 train on the R188s were replaced with those from Awkwafina for one week. The announcements from Awkwafina featured jokes in addition to the standard station announcements. The agreement was the first time that the MTA has replaced train announcements as a form of advertising. In April 2024, the MTA indicated that it would record public service announcements by celebrities, which would be played on New Technology Trains for one year as part of a pilot program.

=== Electronic strip maps ===
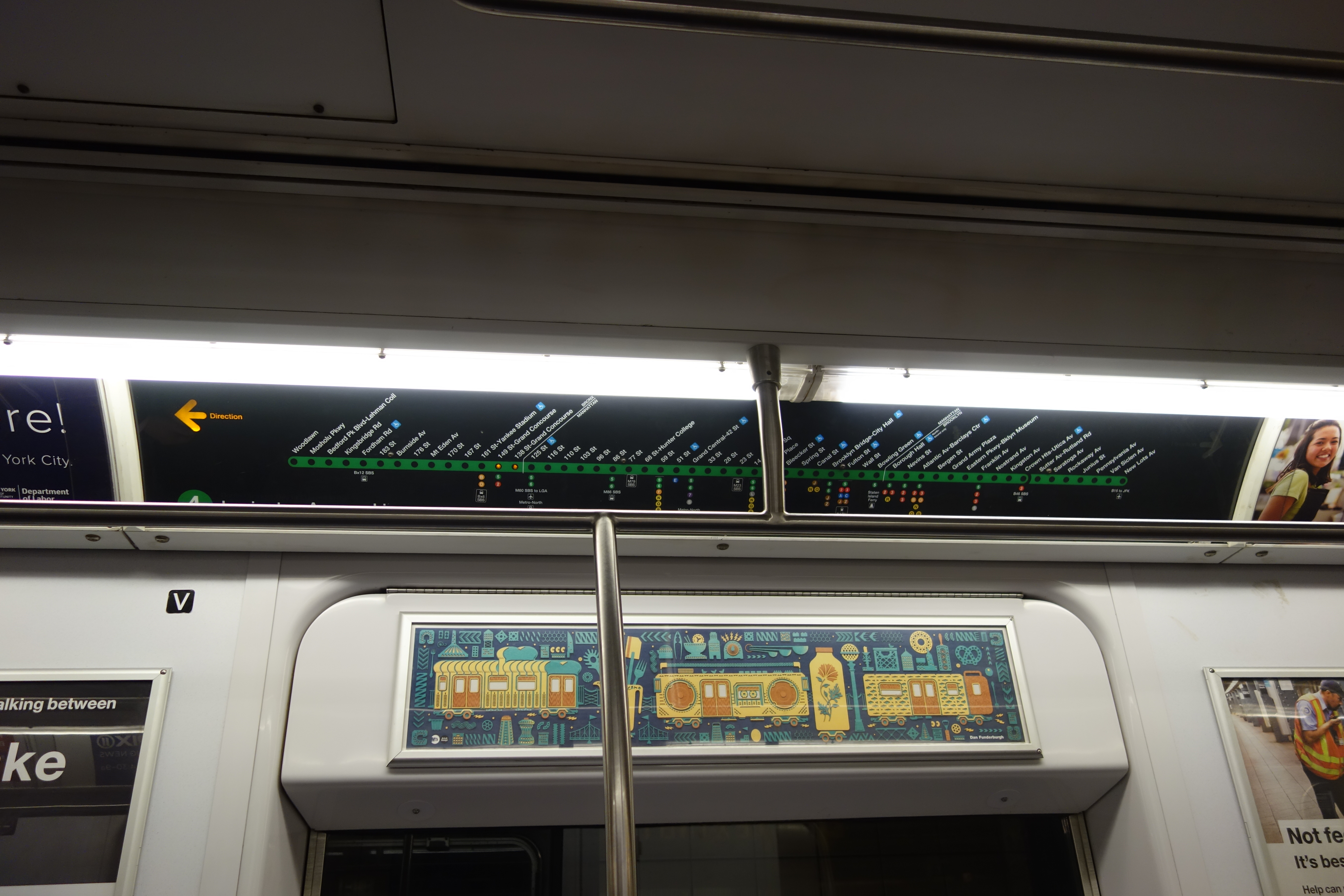
An electronic strip map on a R142 4 train

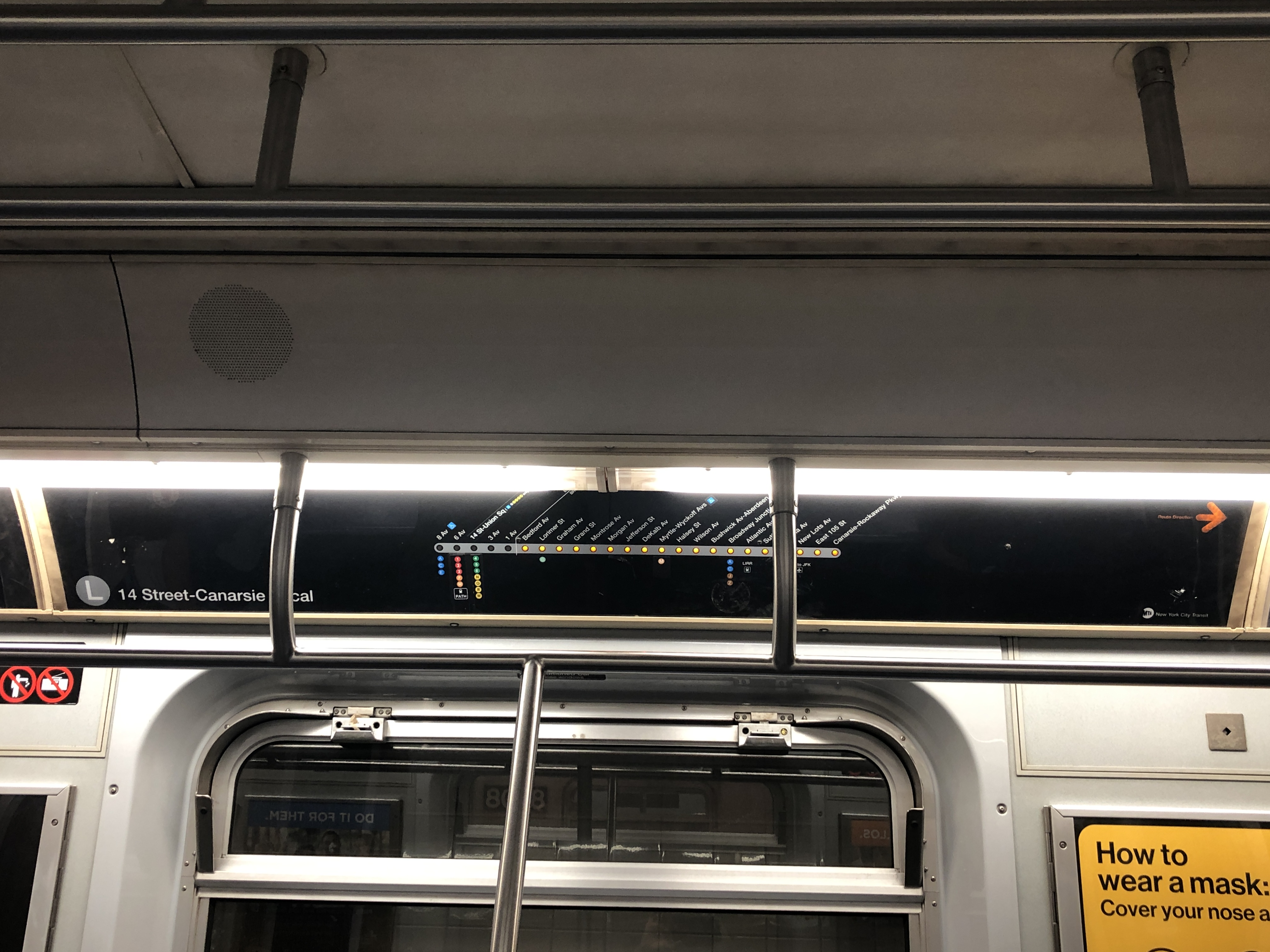
An electronic strip map on a R143 L train

The R142s, R142As, R143s, and R188s feature electronic "strip maps." These maps utilize a total of 64 amber LED lights, numbered 00–63, to display stops, with a plastic card on top showing the route, stations, and transfers. A light will flash when a stop is being approached, and idle while at that stop. Lights turned off indicate a stop already reached, or a part of the route not serviced on that particular trip. LED arrows at either end of the map indicate the direction of service.

Electronic strip maps were first tested on the R110A and R110B in the 1990s. While an upgrade from static route maps, most of the strip maps can only facilitate one service and must be turned off when a train is used on another route. This problem is common on the 2 and 5 trains, which both use R142 cars based from the East 180th Street and 239th Street yards and have large amounts of route overlap on the IRT White Plains Road, Eastern Parkway, and Nostrand Avenue lines. The problem is also seen occasionally on the J/Z and L trains, which use R143 cars from the East New York yard that is shared by all three services. To solve this problem, the MTA began replacing the individual strip maps for cars assigned to these routes in 2016, with combined strip maps showing both services; the R143s would later be retrofitted with strip maps that also show all stops used by all three services beginning in late 2019.

=== Digital displays ===
==== Wayfinding displays ====
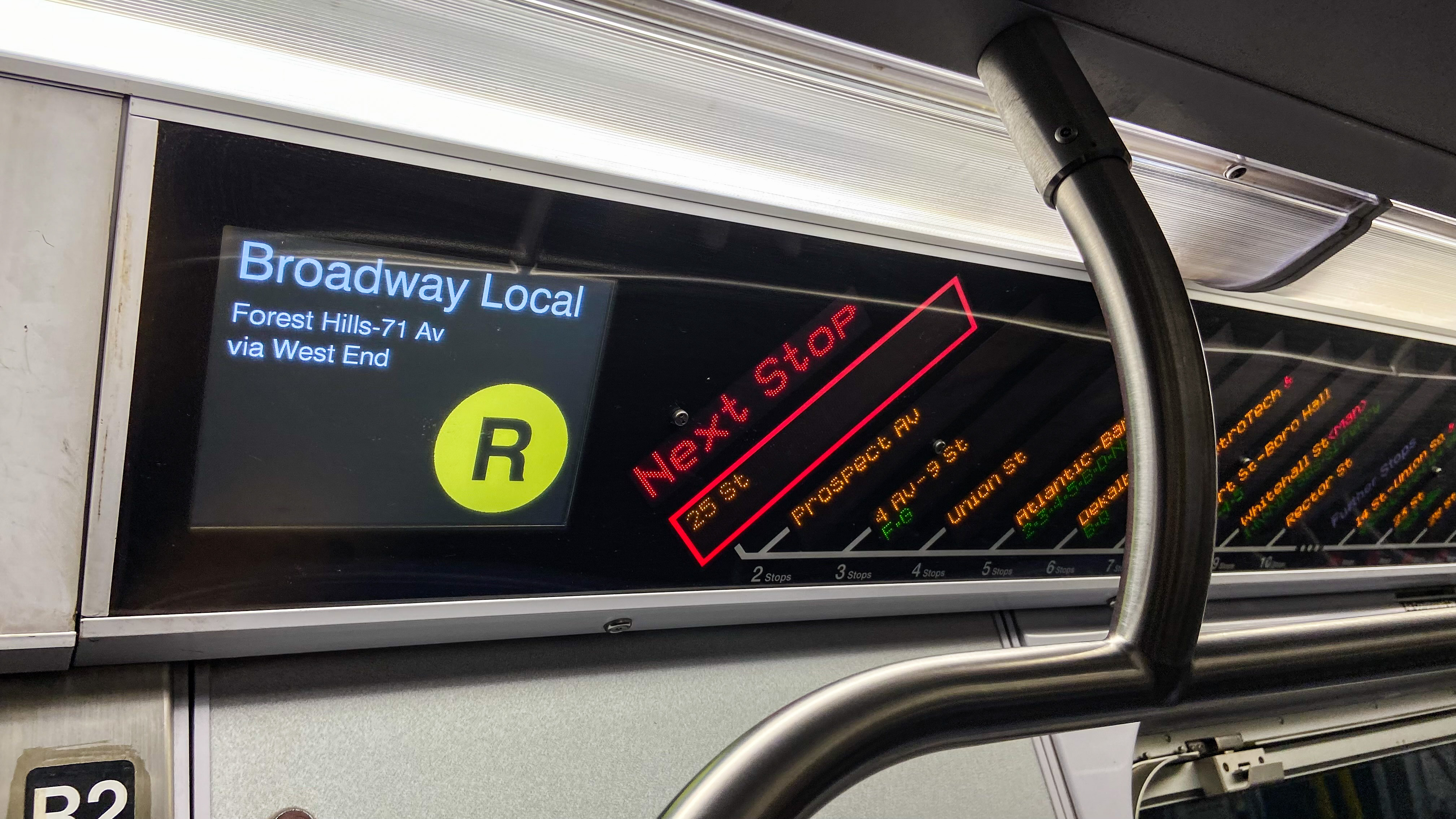
The FIND display system on an R160.

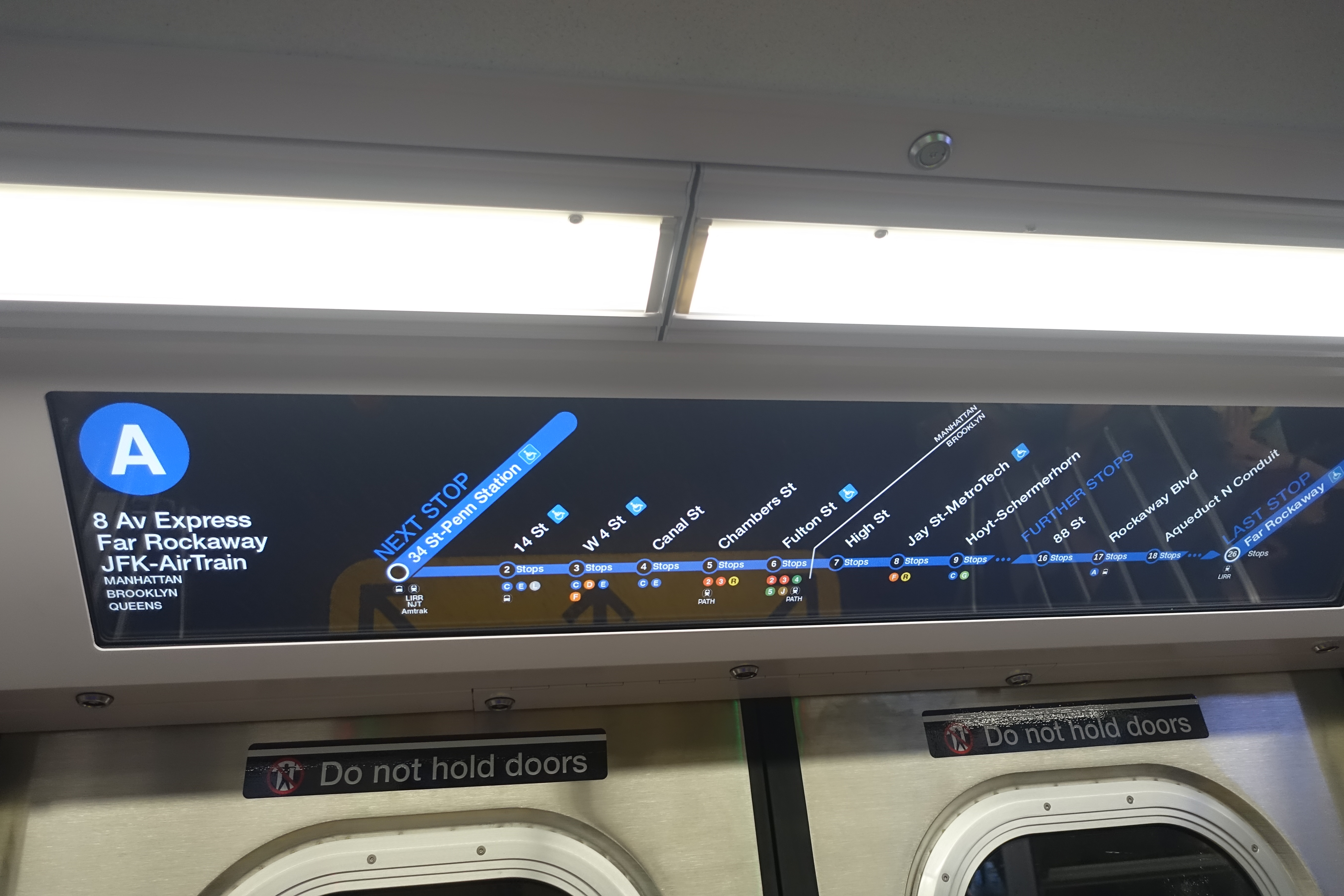
The digital display system on an R211.

The R160s, R179s, and R211s employ digital display systems as an advanced alternative to strip maps. These systems update the stations at every stop, also giving the number of stops to each station listed. As the displays can be used by multiple routes instead of one, this allows for instant route or line changes with the correct information, which includes, but is not limited to, omitting certain stops (displayed as "Will not stop" in red).

The R160s and R179s employ a system called the Flexible Information and Notice Display, or FIND. There are three of these in every car. This includes an LCD screen displaying the route, route information, and advertisements, as well as a dynamic red, yellow, and green LED strip map that displays the next ten stations, plus five consecutive "further stops" to riders. Although they function the same on both models, the FIND systems used on the R179s have slight differences. The LCD displays where the route's emblem is displayed are slightly larger than those on the R160s. If the FIND has gone blank, the R179 FIND displays "Route change: this map is not in use", as opposed to the R160 FIND, which displays "Listen to train crew for announcement."

The R211 introduces a new digital display system, known as the Flexible Ceiling Strip Display (FCSD). There are eight of these in each car, located above each set of doors. An LCD strip map displays the next ten stations, plus consecutive "further stops". The screens of the R211s have the ability to display additional information when arriving at a station, such as specific bus transfers, elevator locations, and which car the customer is located in. When the display is not being used for wayfinding purposes, the FCSD will show the text "Route Change: This Map is Not in Use", a media display, or an informational message.

==== Advertising displays ====
New Technology Trains built between the 1990s and mid-2010s did not originally have digital advertising displays. A predecessor to these displays are the interior LED screens found on the R143s, which display advertisements, public safety announcements, and other information.

In September 2017, the MTA announced plans to add 31,000 digital advertising screens in 5,134 cars, which were installed by Outfront Media starting in 2019. In 2020, the MTA started displaying real-time service metrics on the screens, such as service changes and dynamic transfer information.

In the R211s, twelve digital advertising displays may be installed in each car, six on either side. There are also provisions for eight Flexible Wall Displays, which are to be mounted next to the door leaves.
