= R110A (New York City Subway car) =

Retired class of New York City Subway car

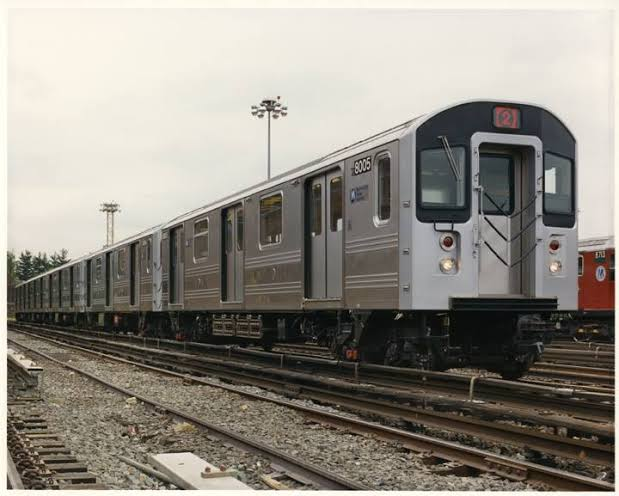
- R110A at the 239th Street Yard in the Bronx

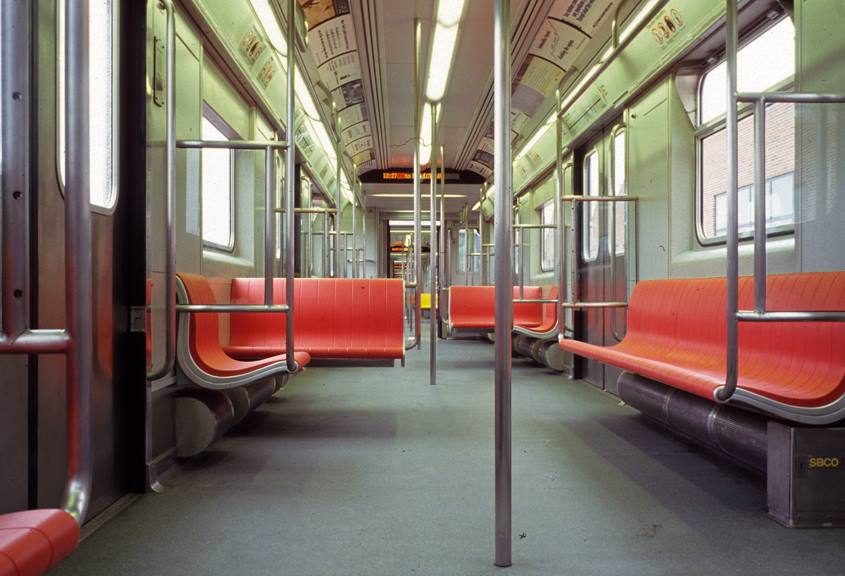
- The Interior of an R110A
- In service: June 15, 1993 – 1998 (5 years)
- Manufacturer: Kawasaki Rail Car Company
- Built at: Kobe, Japan
- Family name: NTTT (New Technology Test Train)
- Constructed: 1992
- Entered service: June 15, 1993
- Refurbished: Work service: 2013–2014 (B-cars) 2021–2022 (A-cars, pending)
- Number built: 10
- Number in service: (6 in work service)
- Formation: Five-car sets or ABBBA
- Fleet numbers: 8001–8010
- Capacity: 24 (A car), 28 (B car)
- Operator: New York City Subway

Specifications
- Car body construction: Stainless steel
- Car length: 51 ft 4 in (15.65 m)
- Width: 8 ft 9 in (2.67 m)
- Height: 11 ft 10.5 in (3.620 m)
- Floor height: 3 ft 8.5 in (1.130 m)
- Doors: 6 sets of 63 inch wide side doors per car
- Maximum speed: 55 mph (89 km/h)
- Weight: 72,000 lb (33,000 kg) (motor car); 67,400 lb (30,600 kg) (trailer car)
- Traction system: GTO–VVVF (AEG/Adtranz/Westinghouse)
- Traction motors: Adtranz 1501A 150 hp (110 kW) 3-phase AC 4-pole synchronous motors
- Electric systems: Third rail, 625 V DC
- Current collection: Contact shoe
- UIC classification: Bo’Bo’+Bo’Bo’+Bo’Bo’+Bo’Bo’+Bo’Bo’
- AAR wheel arrangement: B-B+B-B+B-B+B-B+B-B
- Braking system: WABCO RT7
- Safety systems: dead man's switch, tripcock
- Track gauge: 4 ft 8 1/2 in (1,435 mm) standard gauge

The R110A (contract order R130) was a New York City Subway car model built by Kawasaki Heavy Industries in 1992 as a prototype New Technology Train (NTT) to test various technologies. There were ten cars arranged as five-car sets. They were designed to test features that would be implemented on future mass-production New Tech Train orders. The R110As, along with the R110Bs, are the first New York City Subway cars to feature recorded announcements.

First announced in 1989, the R110As entered service on June 15, 1993, on the 2. They continued to run until the spring of 1998, when they were pulled out of service due to brake problems and fire damage.

== Description ==
The R110As are numbered 8001–8010. The R110A was designed to test out new technology features that would be incorporated into future New Technology Trains, including the R142 car order, and it was not intended for long-term production use.

=== Consists ===
The order is split into two five-car sets (8001–8005 and 8006–8010) that are permanently coupled together. Each car is 51 feet 4 inches (15.65 m) like other A Division subway cars.

At each end of the five-car set, there is a full-width cab. The cab cars are powered by four traction motors each. The center car of each five-car set is an unpowered trailer, and the other two cars are powered by two traction motors each.

=== Innovations ===
The R110A cars are similar to R62s, but they have squarer ends and wider 63-inch passenger entry doors (over a foot wider than the R62 doors, which were 50 inches) that are staggered for better passenger flow because passengers would stand in the niche instead of in front of each door. All car ends have clear lexan glass, allowing passengers to see through to the next car, except on cab ends. Massimo Vignelli was hired to design the car interior with the Metropolitan Transportation Authority Arts for Transit program. The R110A has very bright colors with speckled black floors and with walls that are speckled gray. Unnecessary edges were removed from stanchions, poles, and bars to create a smoother and cleaner appearance. The United States Department of Transportation National Endowment for the Arts gave the 1995 national award for transportation design as a result of these efforts. Interior surfaces are fiberglass, which is resistant to graffiti.

Seating is improved by eliminating the bucket seats in favor of comfortable benches, colored bright red, yellow, and blue. The interior has longitudinal seats on one side and transverse seating on the other, unlike previous IRT cars, which since 1910 have always featured all-longitudinal seating. One side is shifted from the other, making part of the bench on one side of the car face a door on the other side. Some seating space is removed to allow for wider doors. As a result, there was a significant reduction in seats, from a total of 440 in a train of R62As, to 264 in a train of R110As. However, the number of standees went up from 1,332 to 1,684. The seating capacity is 24 in the A-cars, and 28 in the non-cab B-cars. As a result of the loss of seats, there were complaints from the riding public, and as a result, most of the seats were restored on the first New Technology Train orders, the R142s and R142As.

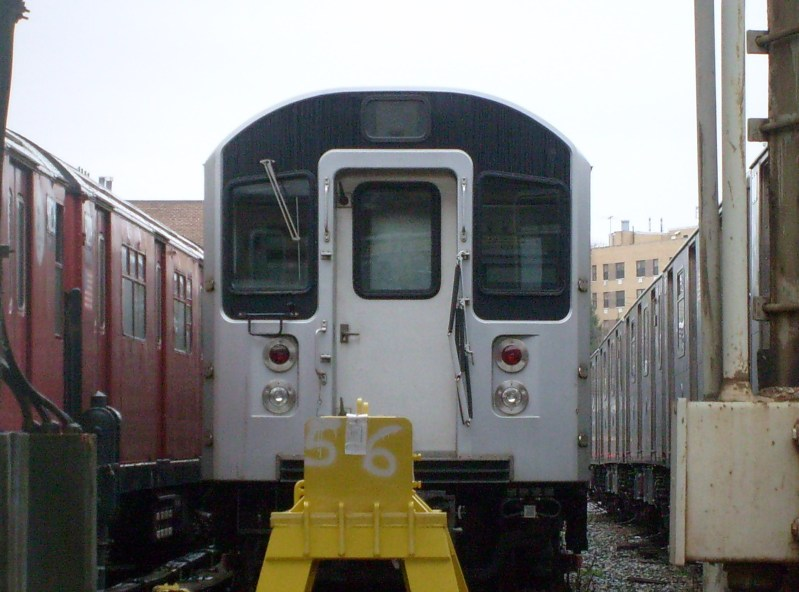
R110A train at East 239th Street Yard

The R110As came with computerized cabs containing a control stand consisting of a single lever for traction and braking control, a reversing key, a small numeric and symbol keypad, and an LCD flat panel display. The display is used in conjunction with the keypad to control doors, reset alarms of various sorts including the passenger alert system, display train speed, and braking information, and do much more.

It was proposed by the New York City Transit Authority to include an articulated train under the R110A contract, but because of the impact it would have had on the project's budget and schedule, it was rejected.

== History ==
During the 1970s and 1980s, the Metropolitan Transportation Authority (MTA) had made several large orders for subway cars, such as the R46, which had new components added to them. However, because there was not a prototype built first for testing, many expensive retrofits were required. The MTA was in the process of creating the first technologically advanced subway car since the R44 in the early 1970s. In order to avoid the aforementioned problem, in 1989, the MTA awarded contracts for two prototype test trains, one of which was the R110A (contract R130) for the A Division built by Kawasaki Heavy Industries, and the R110B (contract R131) for the B Division built by Bombardier Transportation. The cost for each R110A car was $2,209,000.

These two fleets were called the New Technology Test Trains (NTTTs) and would test features that would be implemented on future mass-production orders, specifically the New Technology Trains. The R110A tested new technology, including AC propulsion with regeneration, microprocessor-controlled doors and brakes, roof-mounted hermetic air-conditioning units, and fabricated trucks with air bags suspension. Passenger emergency intercoms for contacting train crews, passenger alarm strips to press in case of an emergency, improved lighting, glass to see into the next cars and the platform, and computerized announcements were all implemented.

The R110A cars entered service on June 15, 1993, on the 2. They ran until the spring of 1998, when they were pulled out of service due to brake problems and fire damage. They were transported back and forth between IRT line yards and stored until 2013.

=== Reconditioning ===
Between summer 2013 and fall 2014, the B-cars (cars 8002–8004 and 8007–8009) were converted to hose-reach cars under contract R32442. A-car 8005 was completely stripped of parts to become a pump train car as well; however, the conversion process was halted sometime in 2014 as it was decided to use only the B-cars as hose-reach cars (along with R72 flatcars OF219 and OF220 as pump cars) at the time. The B-cars were renumbered to P8002–P8004 and P8007–P8009 after conversion. The conversion of the six B-cars for pump train service helped increase the number of available pump trains, which will shorten the amount of time it takes to pump water out of the subway system.

Starting in 2022, the A-cars (cars 8001, 8005, 8006, and 8010) are being converted under contract R32443, with two becoming pump cars and the other two becoming generator cars that will power the equipment in the hose-reach cars and the pump cars. The plan for the A-cars was proposed in June 2017, and was approved in July 2021 and subsequently awarded to Brookville Equipment Corporation. The A-cars remained stored unused until early 2022, when they were towed and taken off property for conversion.
