= R110B (New York City Subway car) =

Retired class of New York City Subway car

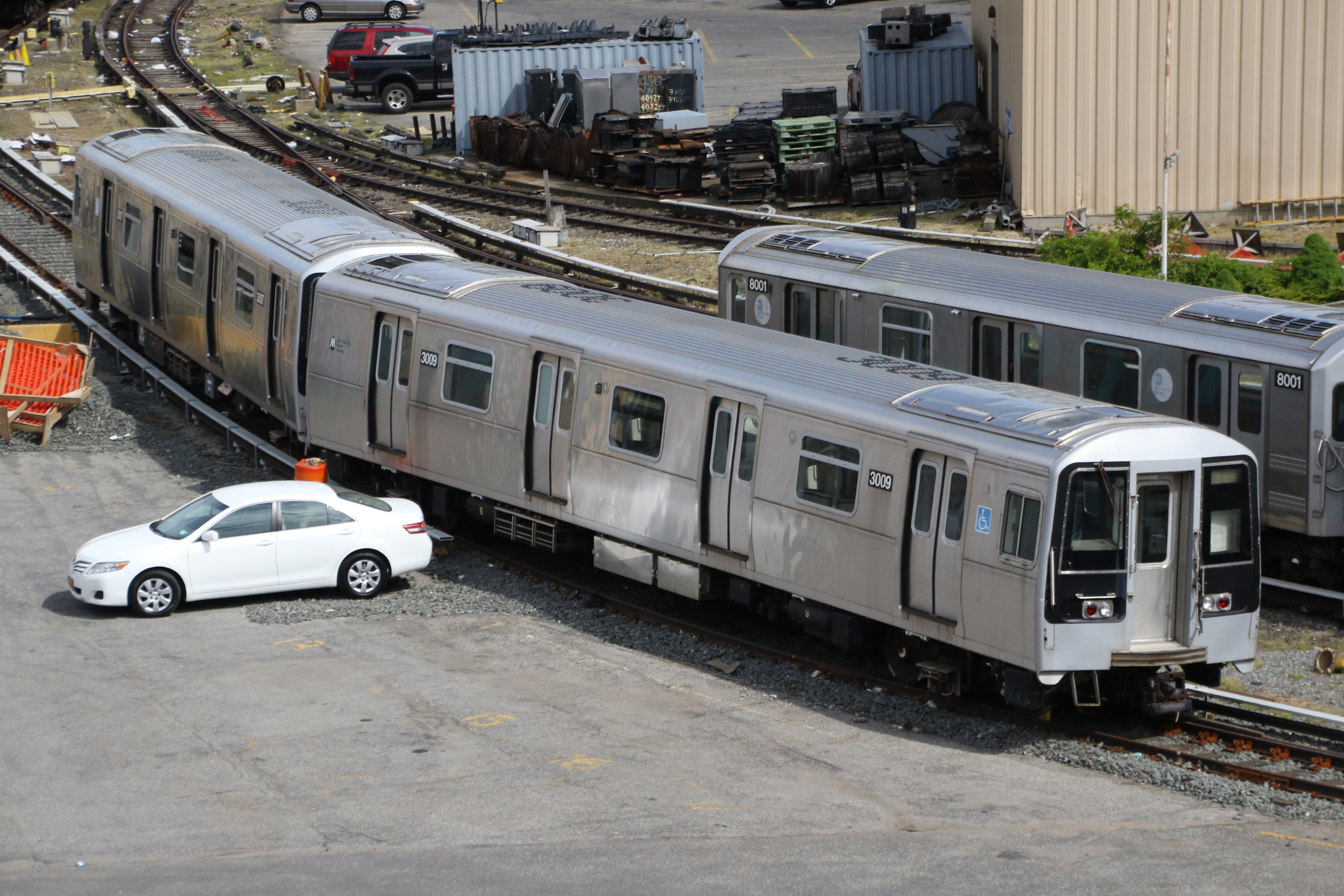
- R110B cars stored in 207 Street Yard

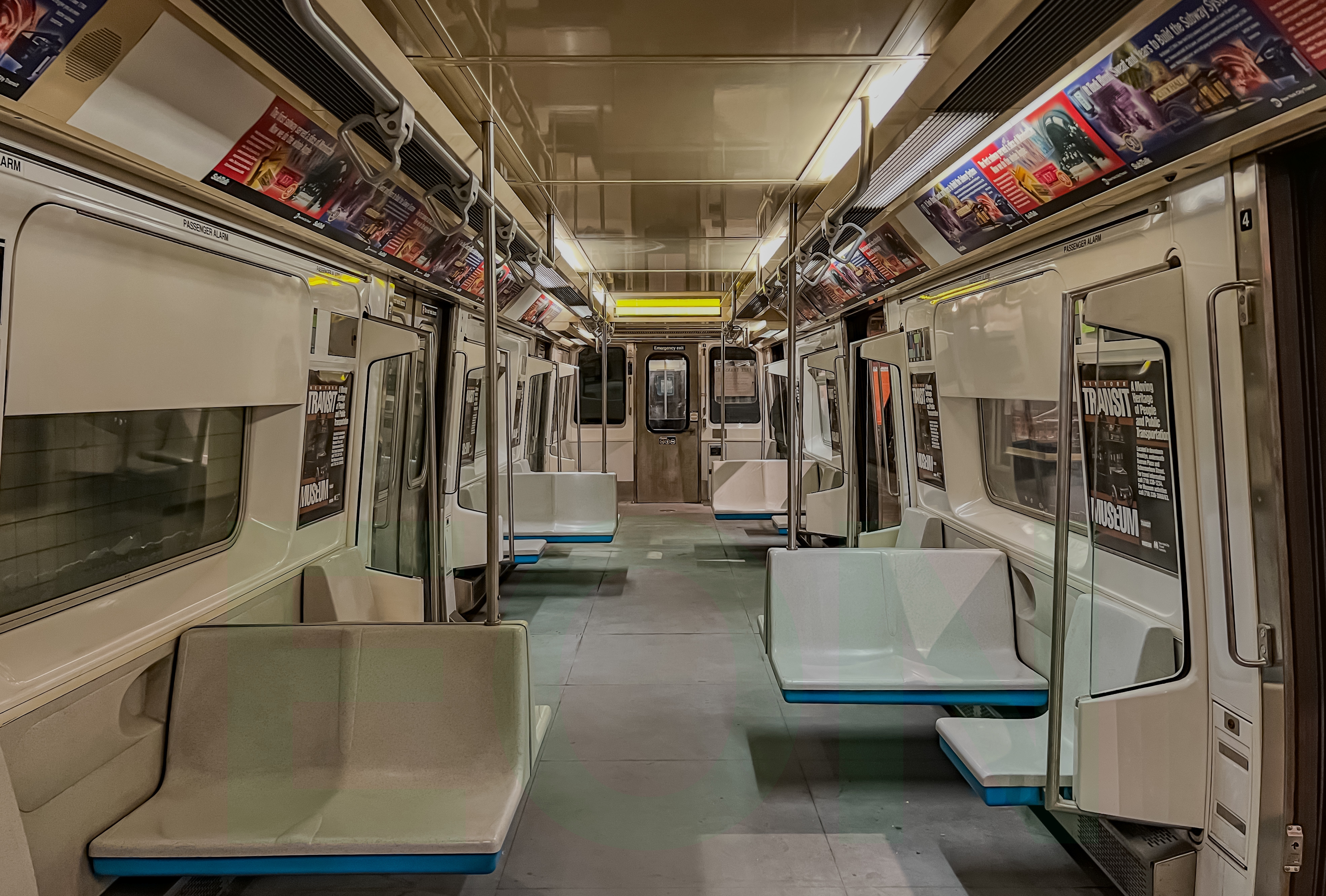
- The interior of an R110B with white/blue decor. This interior is found on cars 3007–3009
- In service: June 15, 1993 – November 2002 (9 years)
- Manufacturer: Bombardier Transportation
- Built at: La Pocatière, Quebec, Canada
- Constructed: 1992
- Entered service: June 15, 1993
- Number built: 9
- Number preserved: 1 (+5 for training)
- Formation: Three-car sets
- Fleet numbers: 3001–3009
- Capacity: 54 seated 183 standing (A car), 50 seated 175 standing (B car)
- Operator: New York City Subway

Specifications
- Car body construction: Stainless steel
- Car length: 67 ft (20.42 m)
- Width: 10 ft (3.05 m)
- Height: 12.08 ft (3.68 m)
- Doors: 8 sets of 50 inch wide side doors per car
- Maximum speed: 55 mph (89 km/h)
- Weight: Trailer (71,000 lb (32,000 kg)); Motorized (86,000 lb (39,000 kg))
- Traction system: GTO–VVVF (GE)
- Traction motors: GE GEB 7-B 202 hp (151 kW) 3-phase AC 4-pole asynchronous motors
- Electric systems: Third rail, 600 V DC
- Current collection: Contact shoe
- Safety systems: dead man's switch, tripcock
- Track gauge: 4 ft 8 1/2 in (1,435 mm) standard gauge

The R110B (contract order R131) was a prototype class of experimental New Technology Train (NTT) New York City Subway cars built by Bombardier of Canada for service on the B Division services. There were nine cars, arranged as three-car sets. They were designed to test features that would be implemented on future mass-production NTT orders. The R110Bs, along with the R110As, are the first New York City Subway cars to feature recorded announcements.

First announced in 1989, the R110Bs were delivered in 1992 and entered service on June 15, 1993, on the A service. An explosion in 1996 forced three cars to be taken out of service, resulting in the remaining six cars to run on the C service. The six cars continued to run until 2002, when they were permanently removed from service due to frequent breakdowns and low Mean Distance Between Failure (MDBF) numbers. Five of the nine cars were sent away to various facilities, with the remaining four still on MTA property.

== Description ==
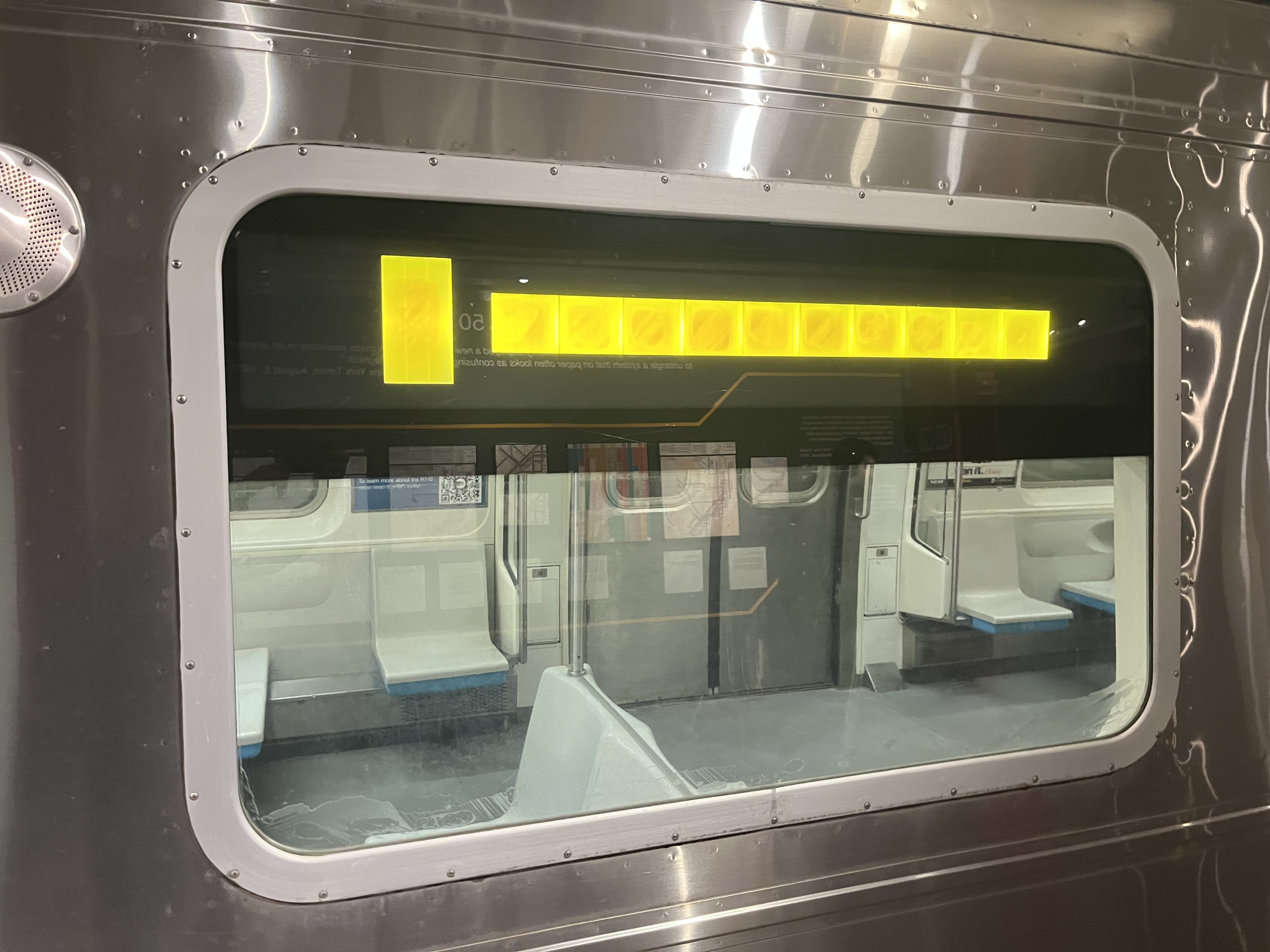
The exterior LCD found of the R110Bs

The R110B cars were ordered from Bombardier in December 1989. The R110B was designed to test various new technology features. There were nine R110B cars, numbered 3001–3009. The cars were linked into three-car sets by consecutive numbers. The cab cars are powered with four traction motors each, while the center car of the 3-car set is an unpowered, cab-less trailer. The cars are 67 feet (20 m) long, 10 feet (3.0 m) wide and 12 1/12 feet (3.7 m) high.

The R110B's windows were intended to be more scratch-resistant than existing rolling stock. The interiors were by MTA designer Melissa Feldman and Montreal-based designer Jean L’Abbe. To provide additional room for standing, the interior had fewer poles and seats compared with existing rolling stock. Inside, yellow LCD signs displayed the time. There were rollsign line indicators in the front of the train, LCD destination signs (on windows) and interior strip route guides on top of the ad space, and an LED indication of stops ahead on both sides.

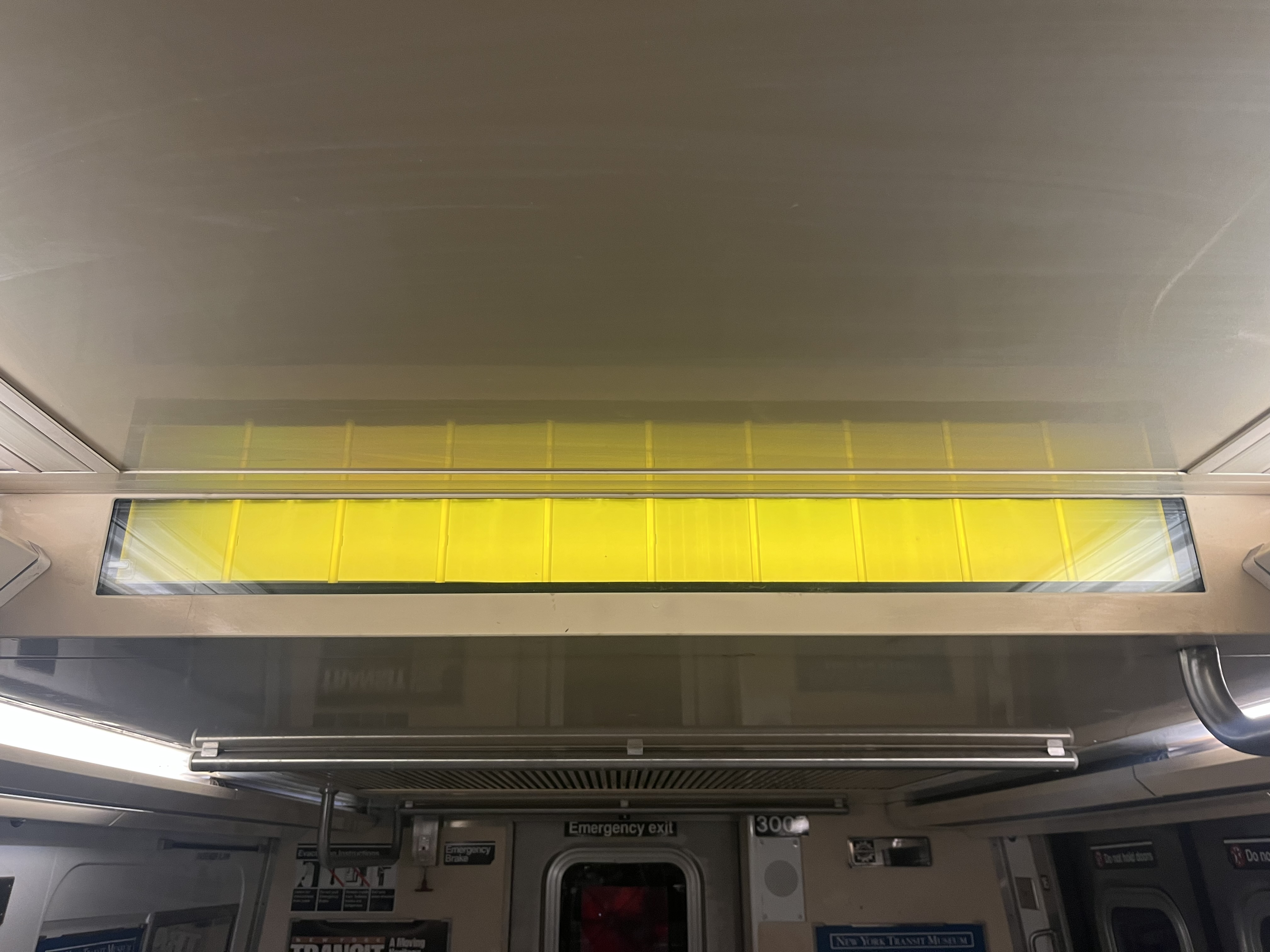
One of the 2 interior LCDs found on each R110B

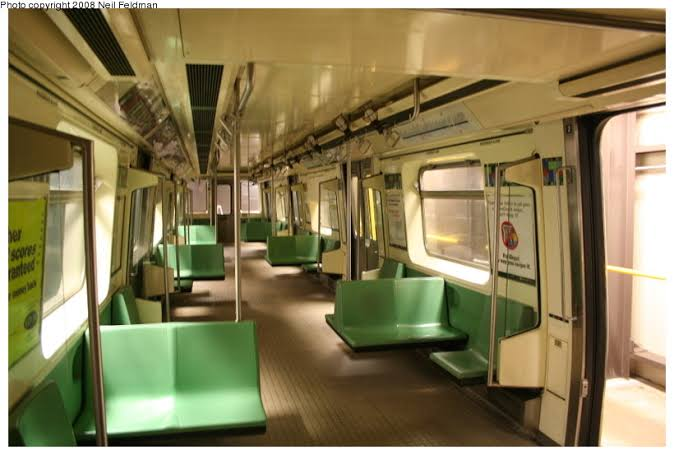
The interior of an R110B with green/black decor. This interior is found on cars 3001–3006

== History ==
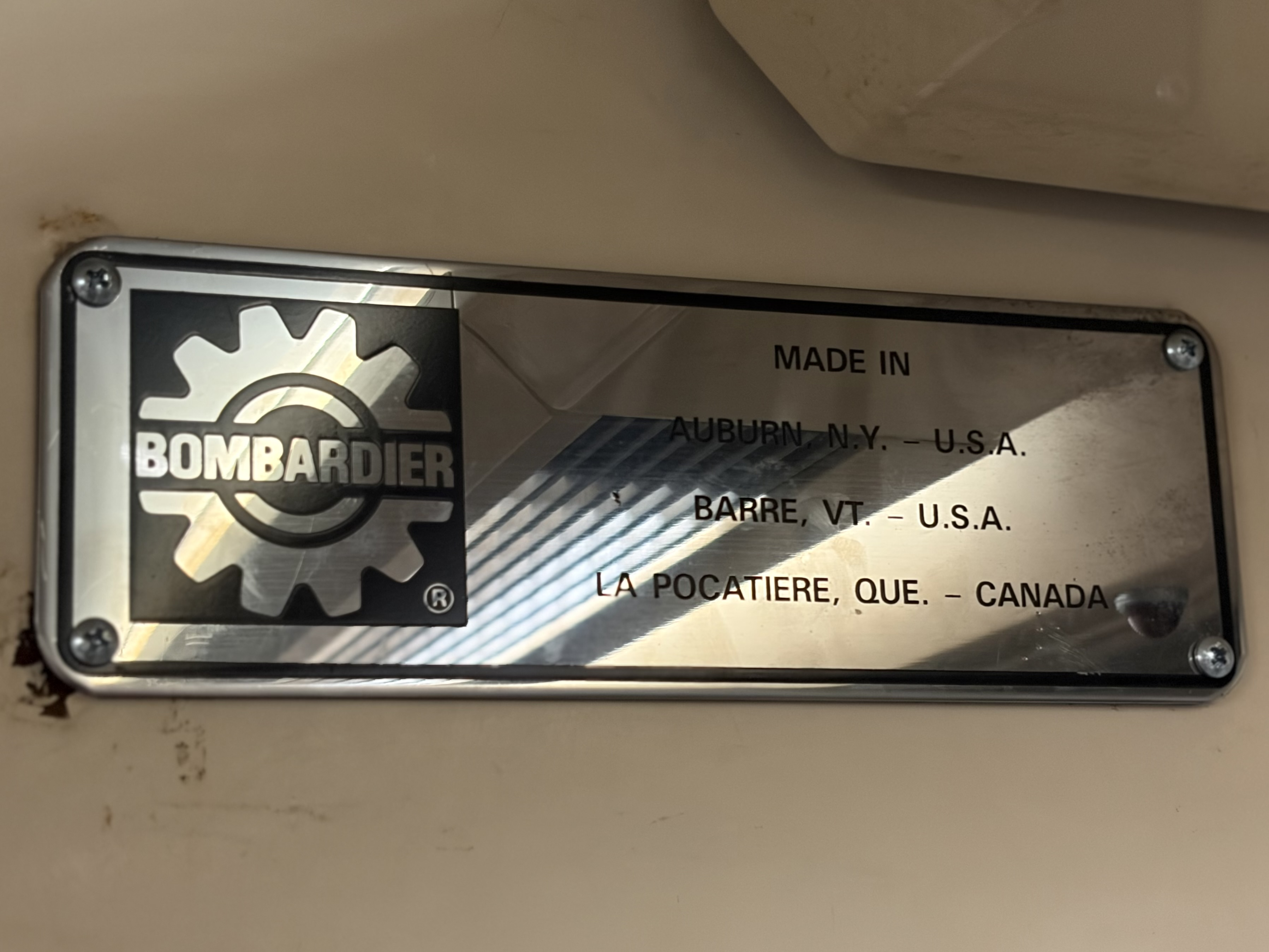
Builders plate of NYTM R110B, inherited from an R62A car

During the 1970s and 1980s, the Metropolitan Transportation Authority (MTA) had made several large orders for subway cars, such as the R46, which had new components added to them. However, because there was not a prototype built first for testing, many expensive retrofits were required. The MTA was in the process of creating the first technologically advanced subway car since the R44 in the early 1970s. In order to avoid the aforementioned problem, in 1989, the MTA awarded contracts for two prototype test trains, one of which was the R110A (contract R130) for the A Division built by Kawasaki Heavy Industries, and the R110B (contract R131) for the B Division built by Bombardier Transportation.

These two fleets were called the New Technology Test Trains (NTTTs) and would test features that would be implemented on future mass-production orders, specifically the New Technology Trains. The R110B tested new technology, including AC propulsion with regeneration, microprocessor-controlled doors and brakes, roof-mounted hermetic air-conditioning units, and fabricated trucks with air bags suspension. Passenger emergency intercoms for contacting train crews, passenger alarm strips to press in case of an emergency, improved lighting, glass to see into the next cars and the platform, and computerized announcements were all implemented.

The R110Bs entered service on June 15, 1993, running on the A train. Initially, the R110B set could not serve some stops on the IND Rockaway Line because the portion of the line south of the Broad Channel station was powered at a different frequency than the rest of the line. This caused the train's on-board computer to shut off the propulsion system near Broad Channel. In addition, the train was so wide that it sometimes brushed against platform edges.

=== Incidents ===
On November 4, 1996, a fire and explosion occurred on car 3006 while the train was in service on the A train. This resulted in set 3007–3009 being permanently taken out of service and cannibalized of parts to repair car 3006 and to keep the other two sets operating. The two remaining sets (3001–3003 and 3004–3006) ran as a six-car train on the C route.

=== Retirement and current status ===
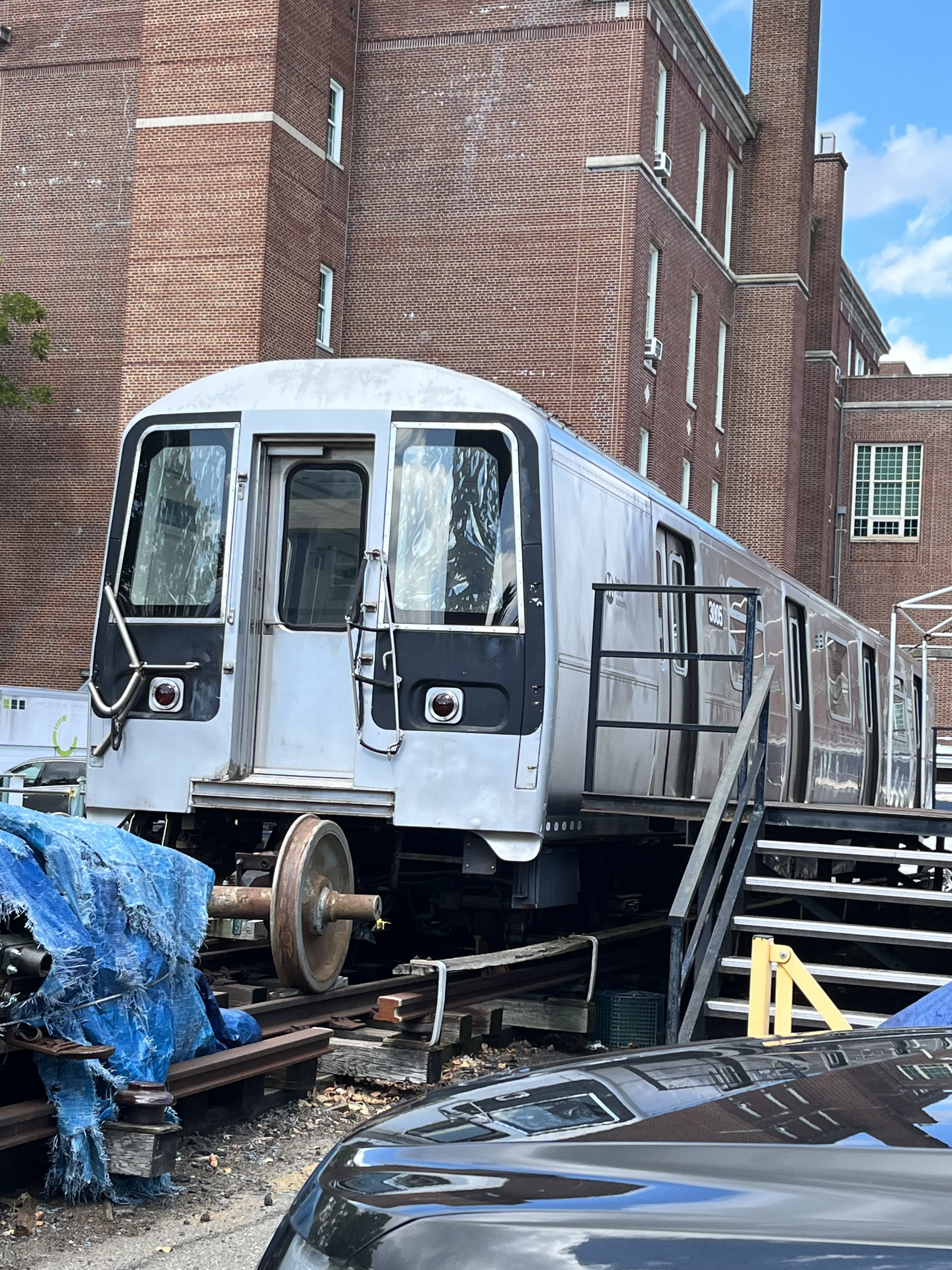
R110B car 3005 at P.S. 248 in September 2022

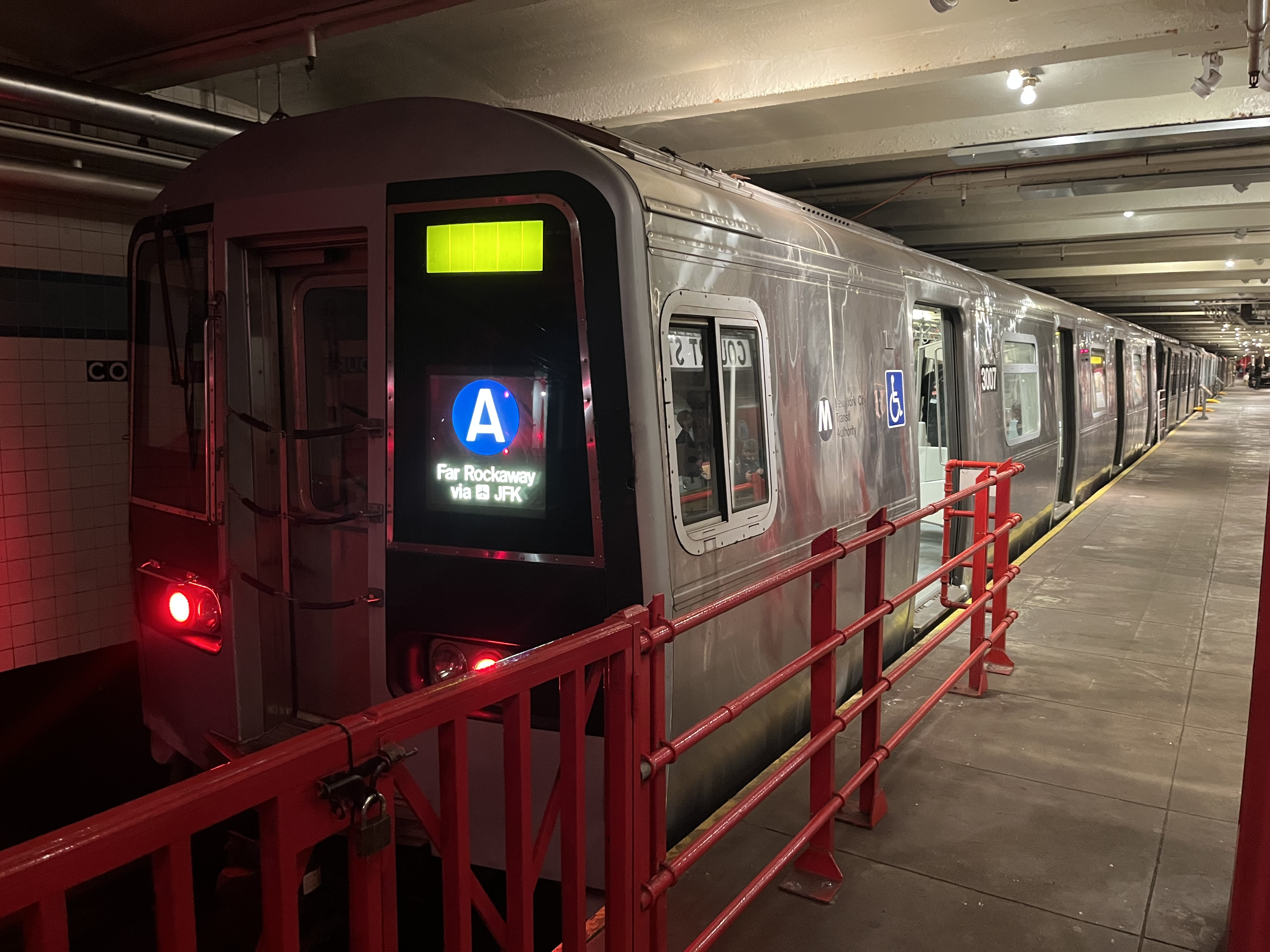
R110B car 3007 displayed at the NYTM in April 2025

Throughout its last years, the remaining six R110Bs had been in and out of service for both repairs and additional component testing. The cars were last used in C service in April 2002 as a gap train, then they were reassigned to stand-by service until November 2002, when they were permanently removed from service.

The cars have been sent to various locations throughout New York City since 2004. Car 3007 was cosmetically restored and placed in the New York Transit Museum in February 2025. The remaining cars are in the following locations:

- 3001 – sent off to College Point, Queens in early 2014 for use as a training car for the NYPD. Part of the car was cut away to allow the car to fit in the building.
- 3004 and 3006 – used as training cars at the Coney Island Yard's firefighting facility, since August 2004. These cars replaced R30s 8392 and 8401.
- 3005 – used as a training car at P.S. 248, the New York City Transit Learning Center, since July 15, 2004. This car replaced R16 6452.
- 3008 – spotted in late August 2015 near FDNY's Randall's Island training facility. Its current whereabouts are unknown.
- 3002, 3003, and 3009 – currently stored at the 207th Street Yard.
