= R15 (New York City Subway car) =

Retired class of New York City Subway car

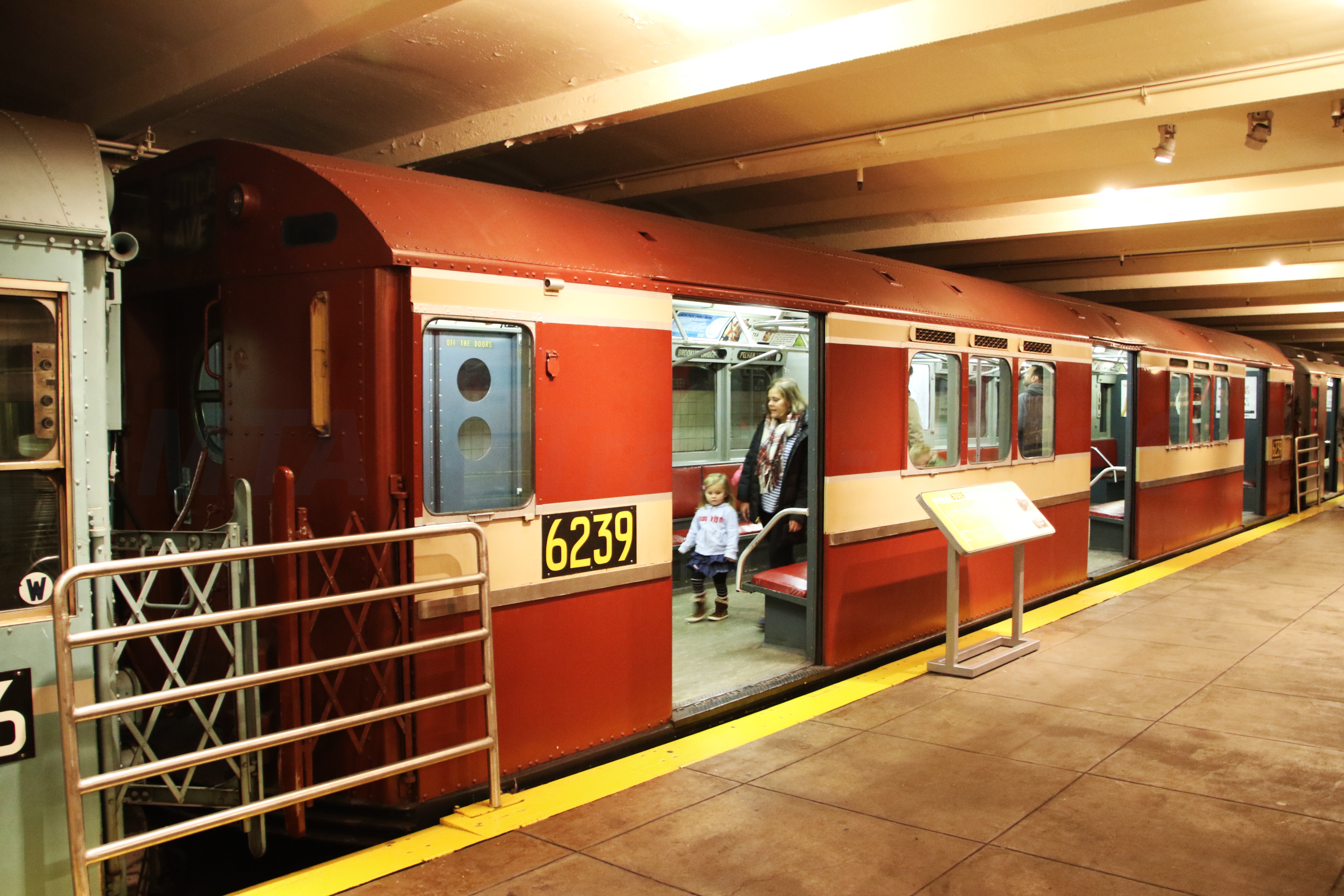
- R15 car 6239 on display at the New York Transit Museum

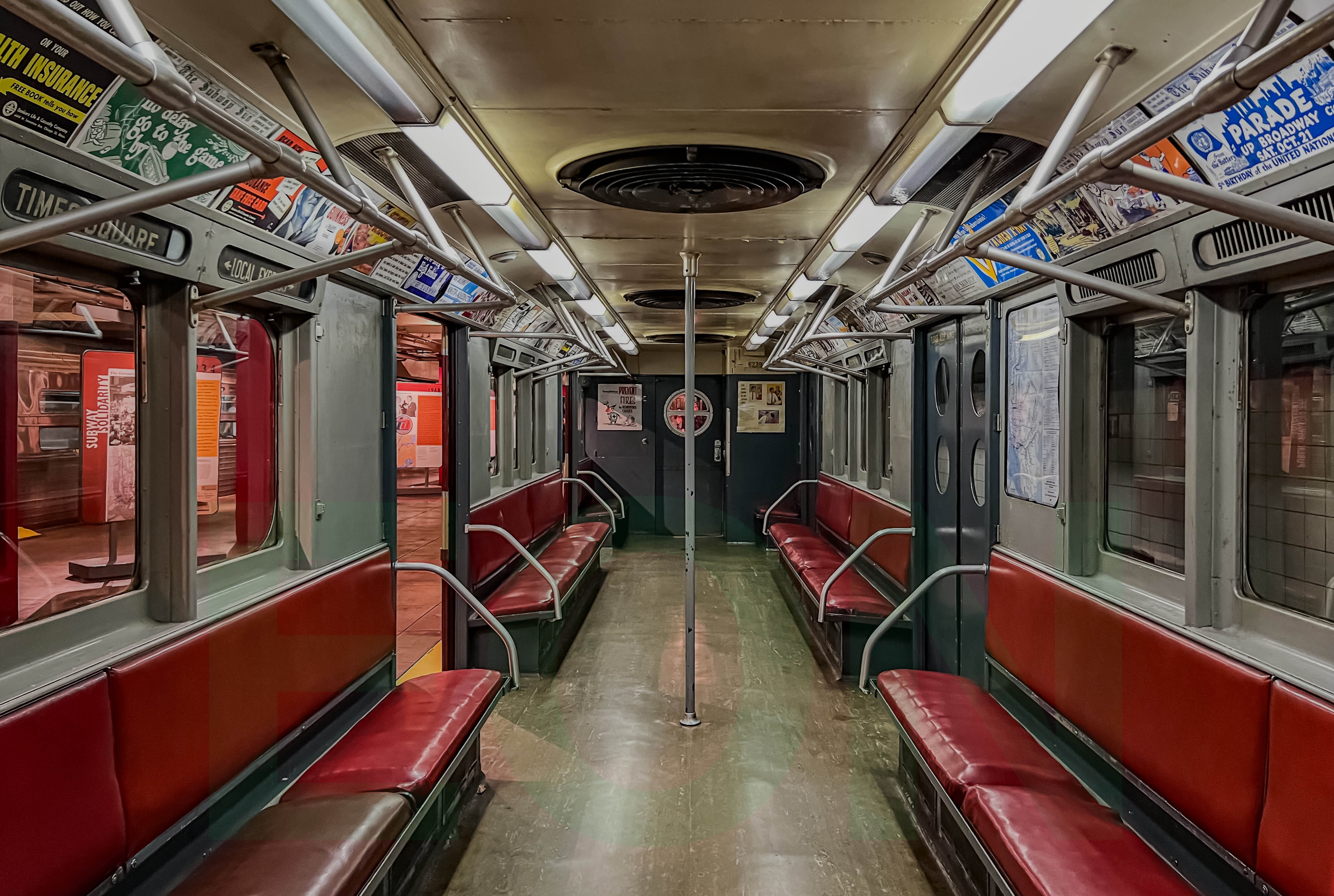
- Interior view of R15 car 6239
- In service: February 4, 1950 – December 10, 1984 (34 years)
- Manufacturer: American Car and Foundry
- Constructed: 1950
- Entered service: February 4, 1950
- Number built: 100
- Number preserved: 1
- Number scrapped: 99
- Successor: R62
- Formation: Single units
- Fleet numbers: 5953–5976 and 6200–6225 (Westinghouse); 5977–5999 and 6226–6252 (General Electric)
- Capacity: 44 (seated)
- Operators: NYC Board of Transportation; New York City Transit Authority

Specifications
- Car body construction: LAHT Carbon steel
- Car length: 51 ft 0 1/2 in (15.56 m)
- Width: 8 ft 10 3/16 in (2,697 mm)
- Height: 11 ft 10 in (3,607 mm)
- Floor height: 3 ft 9 in (1.14 m)
- Doors: 6 sets of 50 inch wide side doors per car
- Maximum speed: 55 mph (89 km/h)
- Weight: 74,778 lb (33,919 kg)
- Traction motors: Westinghouse 1447C or General Electric 1240A3
- Power output: 100 hp (75 kW) per traction motor
- Transmission: Westinghouse XM-179 or General Electric 17KC76A1
- Auxiliaries: 100 hp (75 kW) (4 per car)
- Electric systems: 600 V DC third rail
- Current collection: Top running contact shoe
- Braking systems: WABCO Schedule SMEE with A-1 Application package, J1 relay valve, ME-42A brake stand, and A.S.F simplex unit cylinder clasp brake rigging
- Safety system: Tripcock
- Coupling system: Westinghouse H2C
- Track gauge: 4 ft 8 1/2 in (1,435 mm) standard gauge

The R15 was a New York City Subway car model built by the American Car and Foundry Company in 1950 for the IRT A Division. A total of 100 cars were built, arranged as single units. Two versions were manufactured: Westinghouse (WH)-powered cars and General Electric (GE)-powered cars.

The first R15s entered service on February 4, 1950; the fleet initially ran on the IRT Flushing Line until the R33S and R36 World's Fair fleets were delivered in the 1960s. The R15s were replaced by the R62s in the 1980s, and the final train of R15s ran on December 10, 1984. One R15 car was saved for the New York Transit Museum, and the rest were scrapped.

== Description ==
The R15s were numbered 5953–5999 & 6200–6252. The cars were the first to feature the round "turtle-back" roofs and have the conductors' door controls located inside the motorman's cabs, as opposed to on the outsides as they were on the R12s and R14s. Additionally, the R15s featured porthole door windows, similar to those found on the R11s.

While the R15s ran in solid consists on the Flushing line, the cars never did so on the mainlines; they were always intermixed in trains of newer cars.

Two versions of the R15 were used: Westinghouse Electric-powered cars (5953–5976 and 6200–6225) and General Electric-powered cars (5977–5999 and 6226–6252).

== History ==
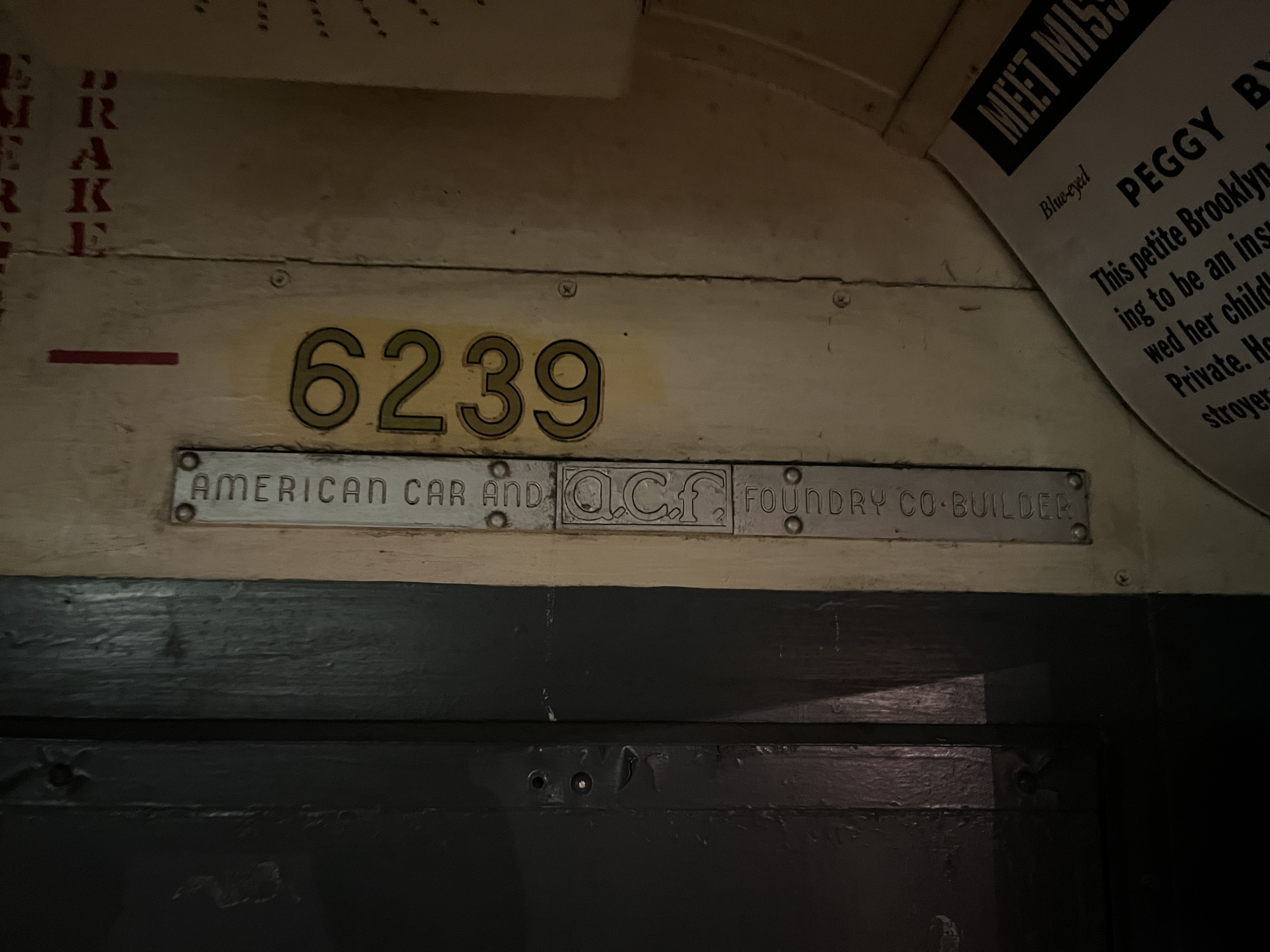
Builders plate of the R15 cars

Delivery of the cars began in January 1950, shortly after the last R14s were delivered. The first R15s entered service on the 7 (IRT Flushing Line) on February 4, 1950. All cars were in service as of April 23, 1950.

The R15s ran on the Flushing Line until the arrival of the R33Ss and R36 World's Fairs in late 1963–early 1964. The R15s were then transferred to operate on other A-division routes before being retired and replaced by the R62s in the mid-1980s. The last R15 ran on December 10, 1984. Except for one car, all cars have since been taken off property to be scrapped; several cars lasted as training vehicles or work cars for many years. For example, cars 5965, 5984–5985, 5989, and 6214 were converted into R71 rider cars after retirement, but were replaced with R161s (R33s converted into rider cars) and subsequently reefed in 2009.

Car 6239 has been preserved by the New York Transit Museum since 1976. This car was retrofitted with the first prototype air conditioners and went into service on September 8, 1955, but the prototype failed and was removed. It was restored to operational status and has operated on many fantrips since 2004, specifically on the Train of Many Colors.
