= R14 (New York City Subway car) =

Retired class of New York City Subway car

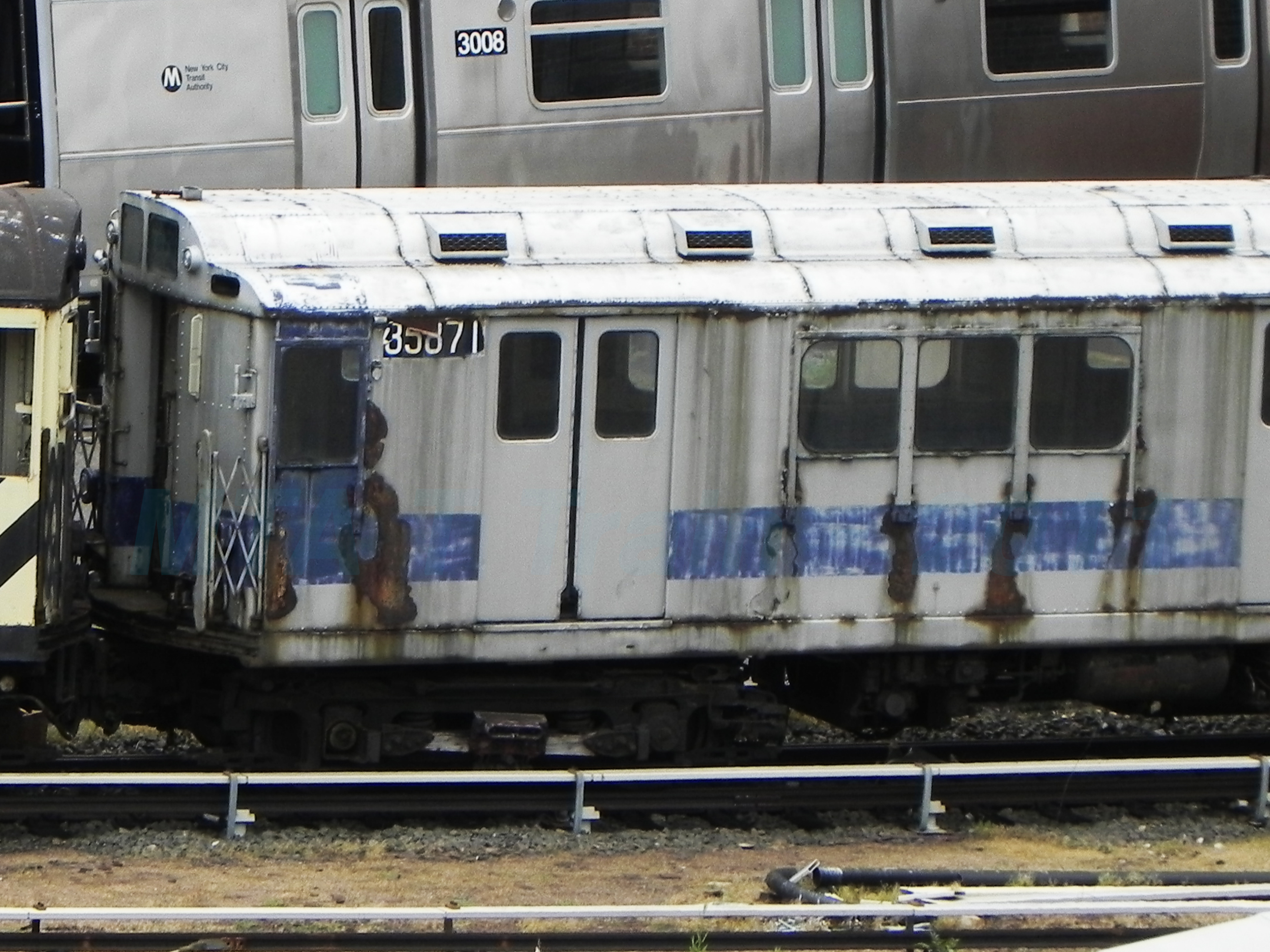
- R14 car 5871 (renumbered to 35871) stored at 207th Street Yard
- In service: September 1949 – December 10, 1984 (35 years)
- Manufacturer: American Car and Foundry Company
- Built at: Berwick, Pennsylvania, USA
- Constructed: 1949
- Entered service: September 1949
- Number built: 150
- Number in service: (1 in work service)
- Number preserved: 1
- Number scrapped: 148
- Successor: R62
- Formation: Single units
- Fleet numbers: 5803–5877 (General Electric); 5878–5952 (Westinghouse)
- Capacity: 44 (seated)
- Operators: NYC Board of Transportation; New York City Subway

Specifications
- Car body construction: LAHT Carbon steel
- Car length: 51 ft (15.54 m)
- Width: 8 ft 9.5 in (2,680 mm)
- Height: 11 ft (3,353 mm)
- Platform height: 3.76 ft (1.15 m)
- Doors: 6 sets of 50 inch wide side doors per car
- Maximum speed: 55 mph (89 km/h)
- Weight: 73,100 lb (33,158 kg)
- Traction system: Westinghouse XM-179 or General Electric 17KC76A1
- Traction motors: Westinghouse 1447C or General Electric 1240A3
- Power output: 100 hp (75 kW)
- Electric systems: 600 V DC third rail
- Current collection: Contact shoe
- Braking systems: WABCO E2 "SMEE" Braking System, A.S.F. simplex unit cylinder clasp (tread) brake
- Safety system: Tripcock
- Track gauge: 4 ft 8 1/2 in (1,435 mm) standard gauge

The R14 was a New York City Subway car model built by the American Car and Foundry Company in 1949. The cars were a "follow-up" or supplemental stock for the A Division's R12s and look exactly the same, differing only in floor patterns. A total of 150 cars were built, arranged as single units. Two versions were manufactured: Westinghouse (WH)-powered cars and General Electric (GE)-powered cars.

The first R14s entered service in September 1949; the fleet initially ran on the IRT Flushing Line until the R33S and R36 World's Fair fleets were delivered in the 1960s. The R14s were replaced by the R62s in the 1980s, and the final train of R14s ran on December 10, 1984. One R14 car was saved for the New York Transit Museum, while another was saved for work service, and the rest were scrapped.

== Description ==
The R14s were numbered 5803–5952. They were the last cars built with outside door operating apparatus or controls.

While the R14s ran in solid consists on the Flushing line, the cars never did so on the mainlines; they were always intermixed in trains of newer cars and were never placed at the conductor's location.

There were two versions of the R14: General Electric-powered cars (5803–5877) and Westinghouse Electric-powered cars (5878–5952).

Some cars of note:

- 5904, repaired after an accident, received the brighter lighting associated with special fluorescent tubing (described under the R12 cars).
- Cars 5809 and 5837 received a speckled orange and blue interior paint scheme during the mid-60s.
- Car 5952 was equipped with ventilation louvres in its side doors.

== History ==
Delivery of the cars began in August 1949. The first R14s entered service on the 7 (IRT Flushing Line) in September 1949. All 150 cars were delivered by January 1950.

The R14s ran on the Flushing Line until the arrival of the R33Ss and R36 World's Fairs in late 1963–early 1964. The R14s were then transferred to operate on other A-division routes before being retired and replaced by the R62s in the mid-1980s.

Cars 5803–5806 were briefly assigned to 3rd Ave. el service in the Bronx to augment the fleet of the G.E. R12s. When the 3rd Ave. el service ended in April 1973, the 4 cars were returned to main line service.

The last R14 ran on December 10, 1984. All but two cars have since been taken off property to be scrapped; several cars lasted as training vehicles or work cars for many years. For example, eleven R14s were converted into R71 rider cars after retirement, but were ultimately replaced with R161s (R33s converted into rider cars) and subsequently reefed in 2009.

Two cars were retained for various purposes throughout the New York City Subway system, including:

- 5871 (renumbered to 85871 and later to 35871) – being held for the New York Transit Museum. This car was formerly used for fire training. The car retains its MTA blue/silver livery paint scheme and has been stored at 207th Street Yard for many years.
- 5944 – converted to R71 de-icer car RD340. Since the reefing of the R71 rider cars, RD340 is the last surviving R14 work car still in service.
