= R62 (New York City Subway car) =

Class of New York City Subway car

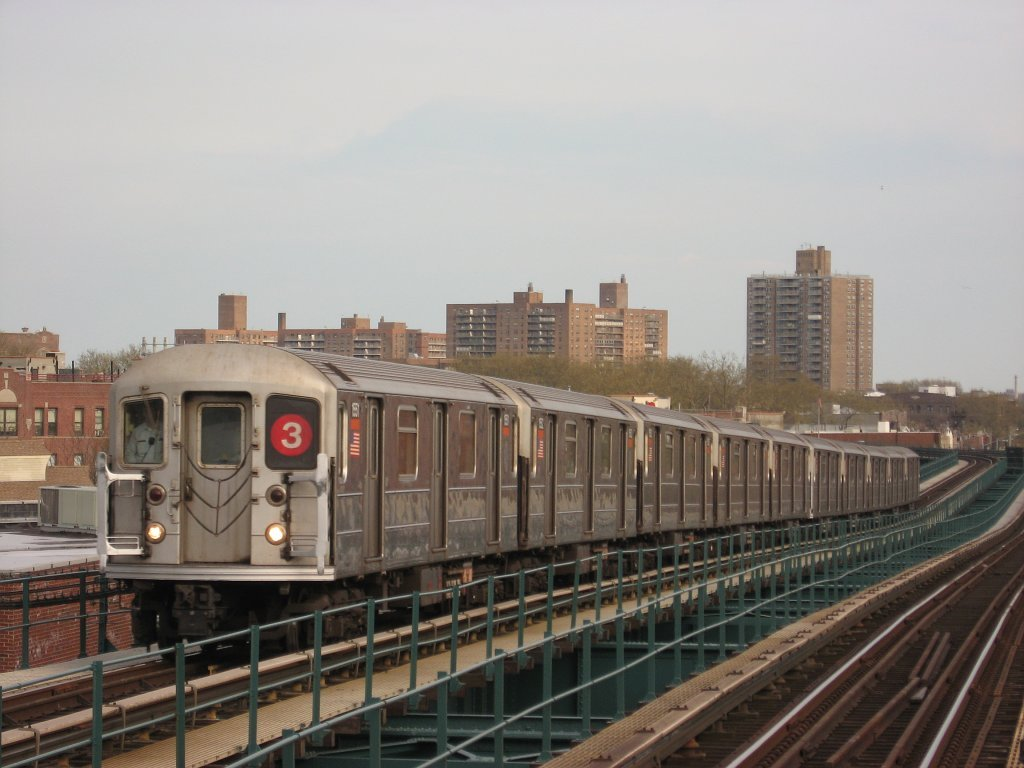
- A Manhattan-bound 3 train of R62s approaching Sutter Avenue-Rutland Road

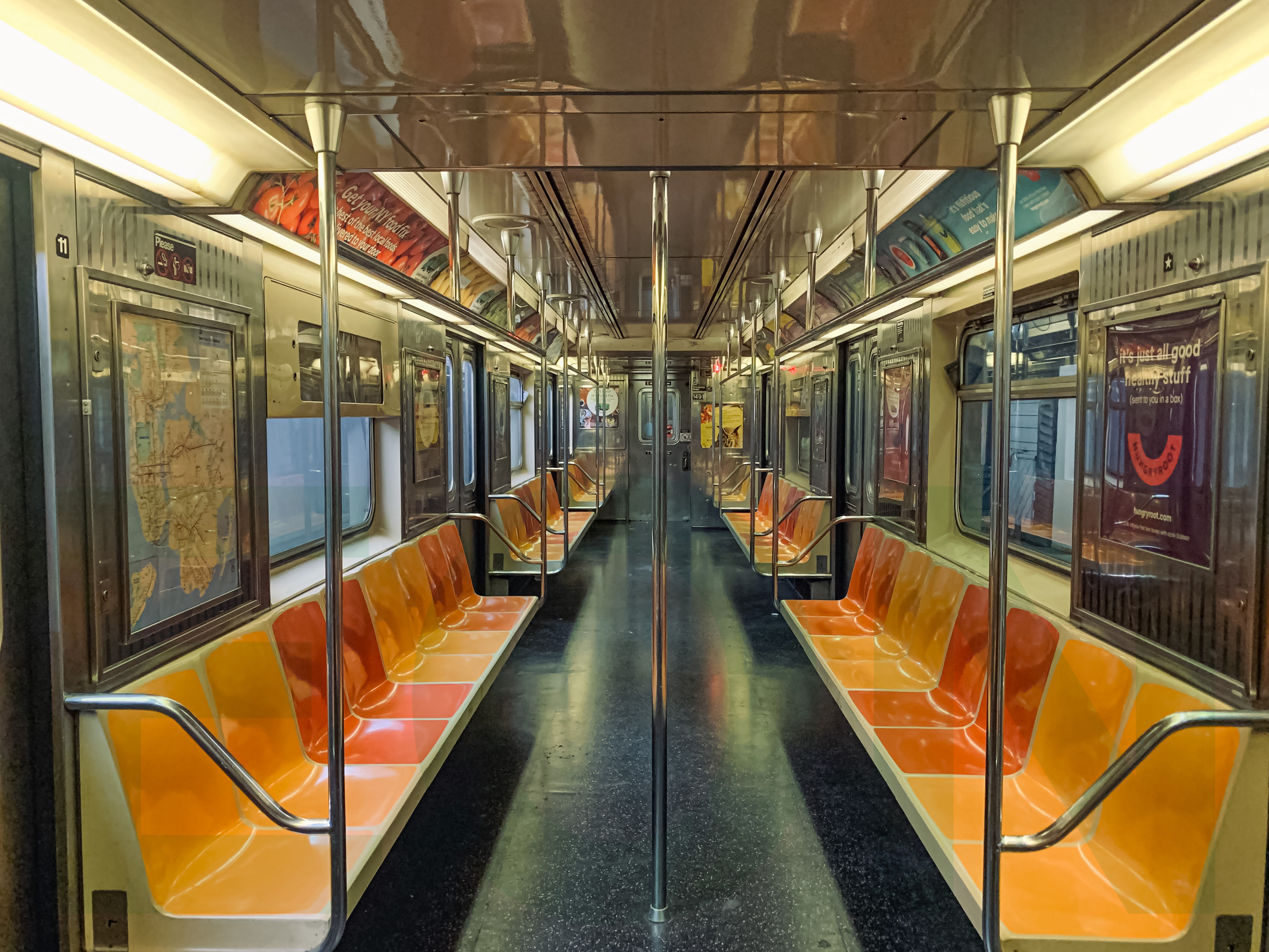
- Interior of an R62 car
- In service: November 29, 1983 – present (42 years)
- Manufacturer: Kawasaki Heavy Industries
- Built at: Kobe, Japan
- Family name: SMEE
- Replaced: All remaining R12s; All R14s and R15s
- Constructed: 1983–1985
- Entered service: November 29, 1983 (revenue service testing); May 7, 1984 (official service)
- Refurbished: 1991–1992 (modified from single cars to 5-car sets)
- Number built: 325
- Number in service: 315
- Number preserved: 2 (for fire training)
- Number scrapped: 8
- Successor: R262
- Formation: 5-car sets (originally single cars)
- Fleet numbers: 1301–1625
- Capacity: 42 (seated-A car); 44 (seated-B car)
- Operator: New York City Subway
- Depot: Livonia Yard
- Services assigned: (Updated June 30, 2024)

Specifications
- Car body construction: Stainless steel with fiberglass end bonnets
- Train length: 510.4 feet (155.6 m)
- Car length: 51.04 feet (15.56 m)
- Width: 8.60 feet (2,621 mm)
- Height: 11.89 feet (3,624 mm)
- Platform height: 3.6458 ft (1.11 m)
- Doors: 6 sets of 50 inch wide side doors per car
- Maximum speed: 55 mph (89 km/h)
- Weight: 74,900 pounds (34,000 kg) (Odd car); 74,540 pounds (33,810 kg) (Even car)
- Traction system: Bombardier Groupswitch ECAM propulsion w/ 4 General Electric 1257E1 motors per car all cars originally had General Electric SCM 17KG1924A1 Group as built.
- Power output: 115 hp (85.8 kW) on all axles
- Acceleration: 2.5 mph/s (4.0 km/(h⋅s))
- Deceleration: 3.0 mph/s (4.8 km/(h⋅s)) (Full Service); 3.2 mph/s (5.1 km/(h⋅s)) (Emergency)
- Electric systems: Third rail, 625 V DC
- Current collection: Contact shoe
- Braking systems: WABCO RT2 Braking System; WABCO Tread Brake Unit
- Safety systems: Dead man's switch, tripcock, emergency brakes
- Coupling system: Westinghouse H2C
- Headlight type: Halogen light bulb
- Track gauge: 4 ft 8 1/2 in (1,435 mm) standard gauge

The R62 is a New York City Subway car model built between 1983 and 1985 by Kawasaki Heavy Industries in Kobe, Japan, for the A Division. A total of 325 cars were built, originally as single units. When the reliability of the fleet improved, they were converted to five-car sets. The cars replaced the remaining R12s, R14s, and R15s, which were all retired by the end of 1984.

The R62 was the first order of A Division cars in 20 years (following the R36 order from 1963), and the first stainless steel subway car built for the A Division. The first cars entered revenue service testing on November 29, 1983, and officially entered service on May 7, 1984. The R62s are scheduled to remain in service until the mid 2030s, when they will be replaced with the R262s.

== Description ==
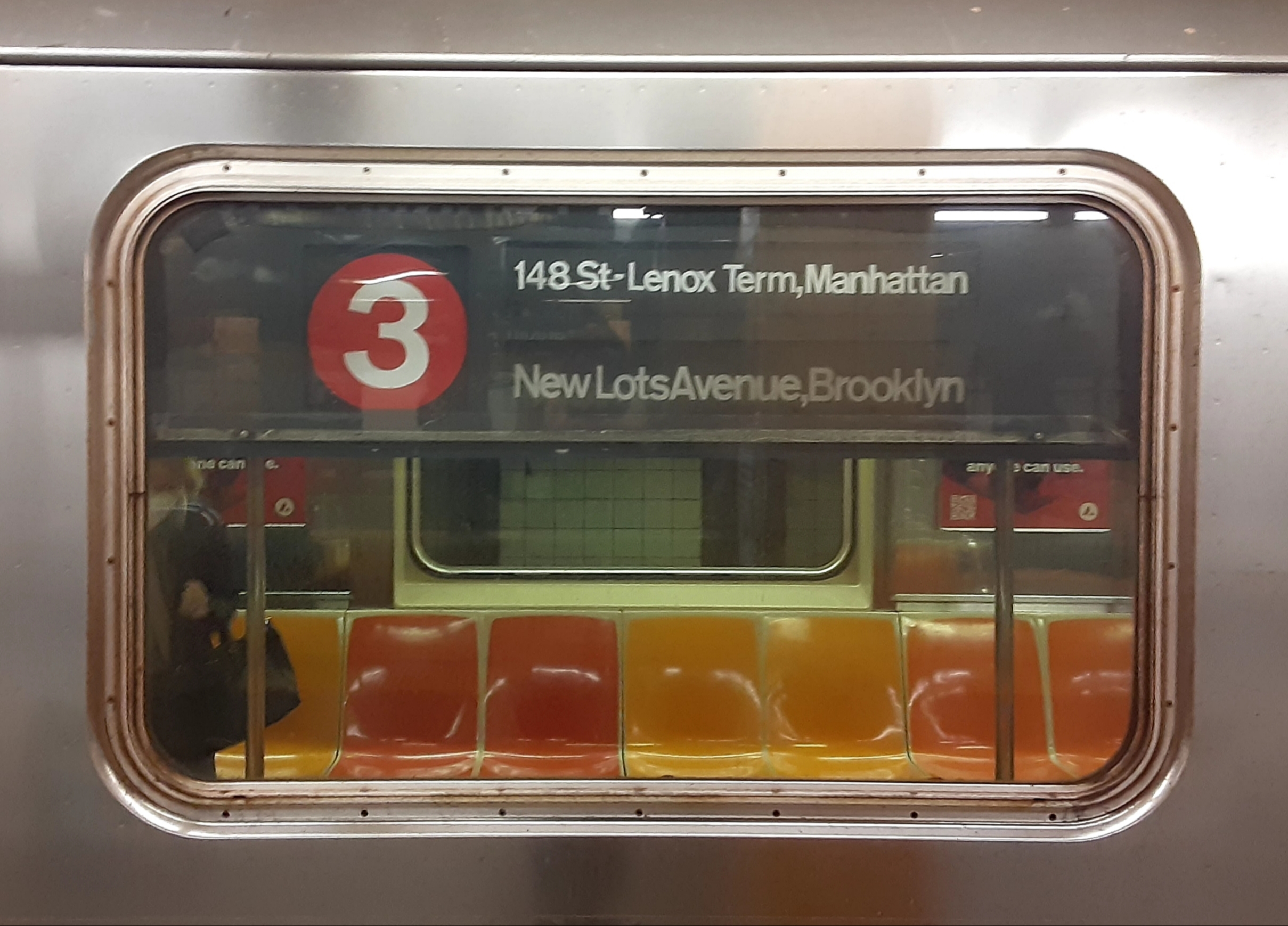
Side destination and route rollsigns of an R62

The R62s are numbered 1301–1625, totaling 325 cars. Each car was purchased at an average price of US$918,293.

The R62 was the first stainless steel and air-conditioned subway car built for the A Division. A graffiti-resistant glaze was applied to all of the cars because of the extensive graffiti tagging of nearly all of the subway cars in the system since 1969. They continued a controversial interior design by employing bucket seating, which was very narrow, with each seat being about 17 inches (430 mm) wide. This reduced the number of seats per car when compared to standard bench seating, but allowed for higher standing capacity. This design originated with the R44 and continued through the R68A order. Five cars in the order (1587–1591) were built with bench seating after complaints by passengers upon delivery.

The R62s have full-width cabs at each end of each five-car set, but retain intermediate half-width cabs in the remaining cab positions, as the trains were originally built as single cars.

The R62s also brought back the much more reliable WABCO RT-2 or SMEE braking system after an absence from subway equipment last used on their R42s in 1969. WABCO also discontinued their trouble-prone RT-5 or P-wire braking systems after disastrous results, with continuous teething problems used during the 1970s period.

Currently, almost all R62s are assigned to the Livonia Yard in Brooklyn and run on the 3, while one set is assigned to Westchester Yard in the Bronx and runs on the 6.

== History ==
=== Car order ===
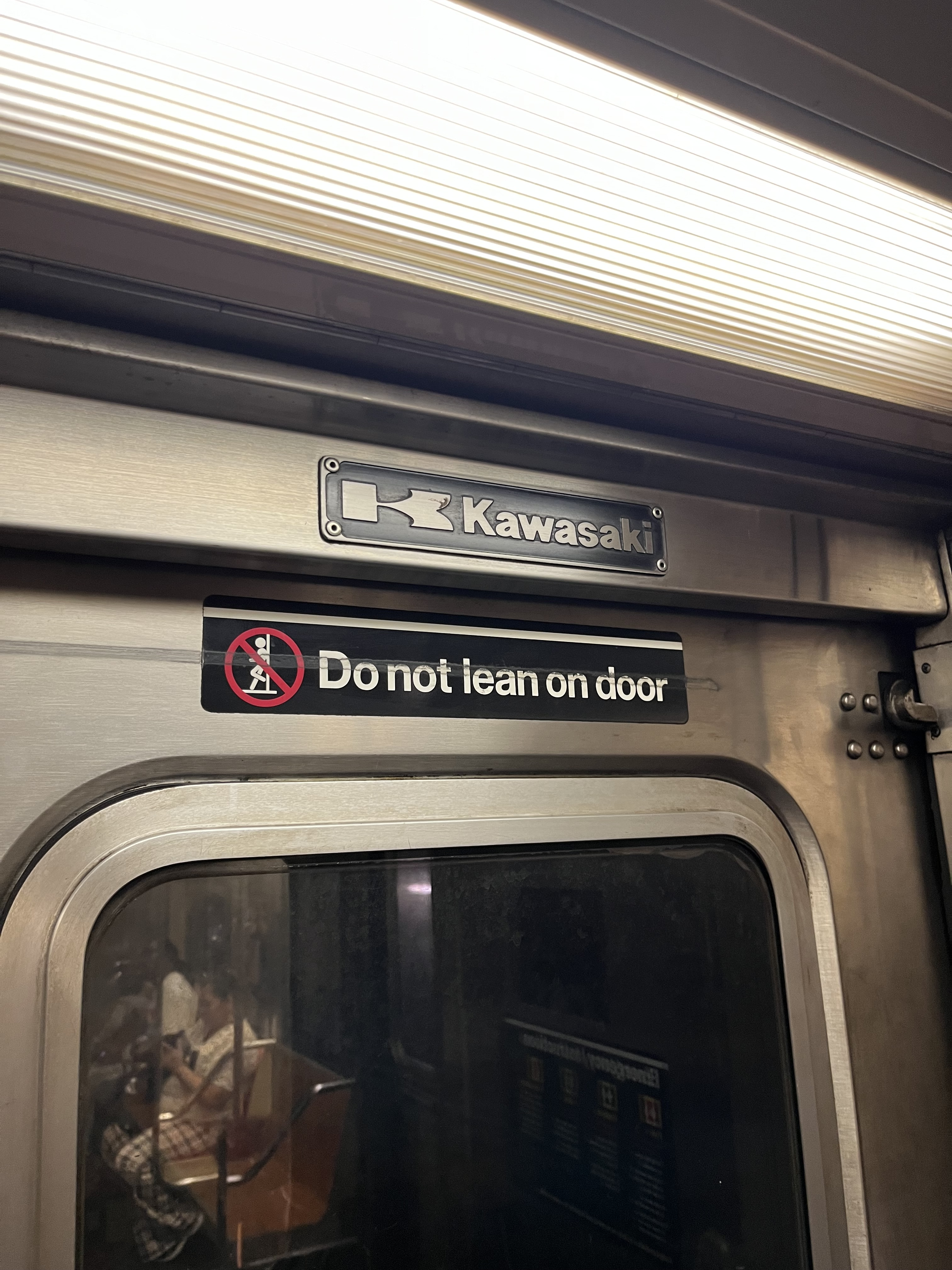
Builders plate of the R62 cars (Seen above the "Do not lean on door" sticker)

After the R36 cars were delivered in 1963–1964, no more IRT cars were built for another 20 years. Several rolling stock orders were proposed for the IRT during this time. In 1966, the Budd Company proposed a lightweight R39 subway car, similar to their M-3 (A49/A50/A51) cars then in use on the Philadelphia Transportation Company's (now SEPTA) Market–Frankford Line in Philadelphia, for the oldest elevated IRT and BMT lines; however, this proposal failed because most of the remaining elevated lines were subsequently closed and demolished instead. In 1973, another proposal to replace the R12 through R17 series was deferred because not enough voters approved it. Finally, in 1979, with the bus and train fleets in poor and decrepit shape, the New York City Transit Authority (NYCTA) looked into capital maintenance and bond acts to replace the oldest IRT cars (the R12s, R14s, R15s, and R17s) and to rebuild and refurbish newer (at the time) IRT cars (R21s and beyond). A bond issue for 136 new IRT cars was approved, and funds were procured for another new 1,014 IRT cars in 1981. These cars were referred to as the "R62" contract. The R62 order was originally proposed as an order of 260 cars, each of which were to be 64 feet (20 m) long. The selected plan called for 325 51.4-foot (15.7 m) IRT cars instead.

In July 1981, the NYCTA began the bidding process for 325 cars under the R62 contract. Nissho-Iwai American Corp, the parent company of Japanese train car builder Kawasaki Heavy Industries, was the lowest bidder for the initial 325 cars, while the American Budd Company submitted a high bid for the initial contract and a low bid for the rest of the cars. The NYCTA did not want to award the large contract to a single builder (as it did in 1975–78 with the R46s, which were plagued by mechanical problems and cracks in the chassis).

The R62 contract was ordered on April 12, 1982, and awarded to Kawasaki Heavy Industries. This was the first time a foreign company was chosen to build cars for the New York City Subway, which was possible since no federal funding was involved. Because a 1981 law now allowed the MTA and suppliers to broker contracts rather than simply accept the lowest bid, the MTA awarded the base contract to Kawasaki.

=== Delivery ===
The cars entered revenue testing on the 4 on November 29, 1983, and were also tested on the 2, 5, and 7 trains. The cars entered service on May 7, 1984, as part of the Car Appearance Program. Soon after delivery, the cars also proved themselves much less prone to breakdowns than previous rolling stock. All 325 cars were in service by August 1985, making the 4 the first entirely graffiti-free service in the system in many years.

Kawasaki did not wish to build the additional cars the MTA wanted as a separate part of the R62 order, under contract R62A, for the same price per car. Bombardier Transportation, an Integrated Transportation rail car company headquartered in Montreal, won a contract to supply these additional 825 cars under a license from Kawasaki.

=== Accidents ===
On August 28, 1991, a sleep-deprived and intoxicated motorman caused a southbound 4 train to derail north of the 14th Street–Union Square station in Manhattan. The train was diverted from the express track to the local due to repairs, and the motorman sped through the switch at 40 miles per hour (64 km/h); as a result, the first car made the switch while several other cars in the consist did not. Five riders were killed, and several dozen were injured. Cars 1435–1437 and 1439–1440 were wrecked in this accident. Cars 1435, 1437, and 1439–1440 were scrapped in 2001, while 1436 was reefed in February 2008. The remaining five cars of the consist (cars 1431–1434 and 1438) are now unitized.

On December 21, 1994, disgruntled computer analyst Edward J. Leary firebombed a crowded 4 train at Fulton Street. Car 1391 suffered interior damage, but was repaired and returned to service. A little more than three years later, however, on February 3, 1998, cars 1391–1395, while out of service, was rear-ended by another out-of-service train of R33s at the 239th Street Yard. All five cars suffered anticlimber damage, but were repaired and returned to service.

On October 25, 2000, during the 2000 World Series, a 4 train collided head-on with a work train at the Fordham Road station on the IRT Jerome Avenue Line in the Bronx. Car 1369 and one half of 1370 were damaged beyond repair. Car 1366 and the undamaged half of car 1370 were donated to the FDNY Randall's Island training center, where they are used as training cars along with R40A 4461. Meanwhile, cars 1367 and 1368 were stripped of parts and reefed in February 2008.

=== Replacement ===
Though no R62s were retired by replacement, the aforementioned accidents caused the premature retirement of ten cars. The remaining cars are expected to be replaced starting around the early-mid 2030s. The MTA proposed mid-life technological upgrades for the R62s in 2010, including LED destination signs and automated announcements.

In January 2019, the MTA announced that it would be replacing the R62/A fleets with the R262s, a new train fleet that would be ordered as part of a future capital program. In early 2026, the MTA announced it would be placing the order of 1,140 new R262 train cars to replace the current R62 and R62A fleet.
