= R142 (New York City Subway car) =

Class of New York City Subway car

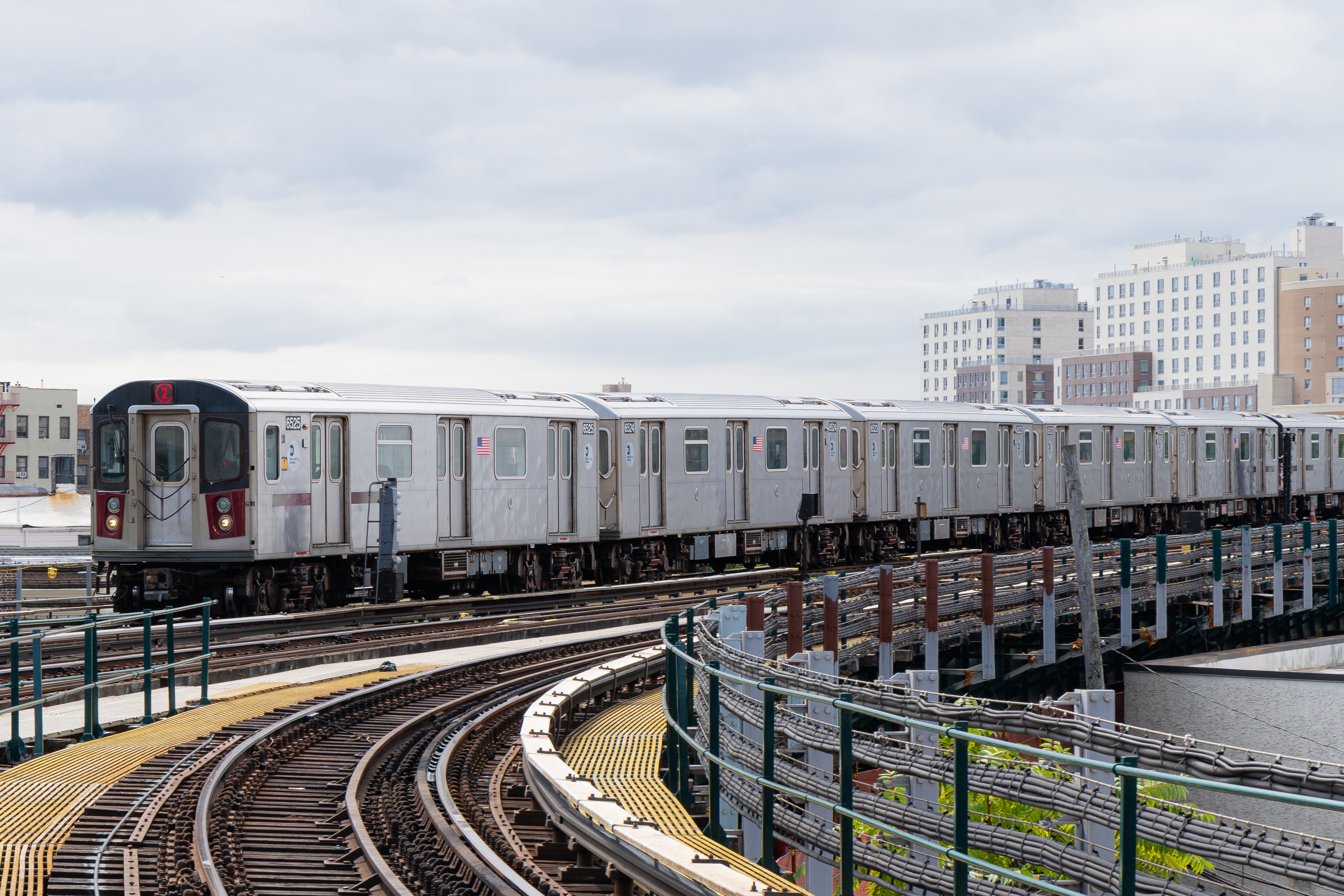
- An R142 train on the 2 route entering East 180th Street

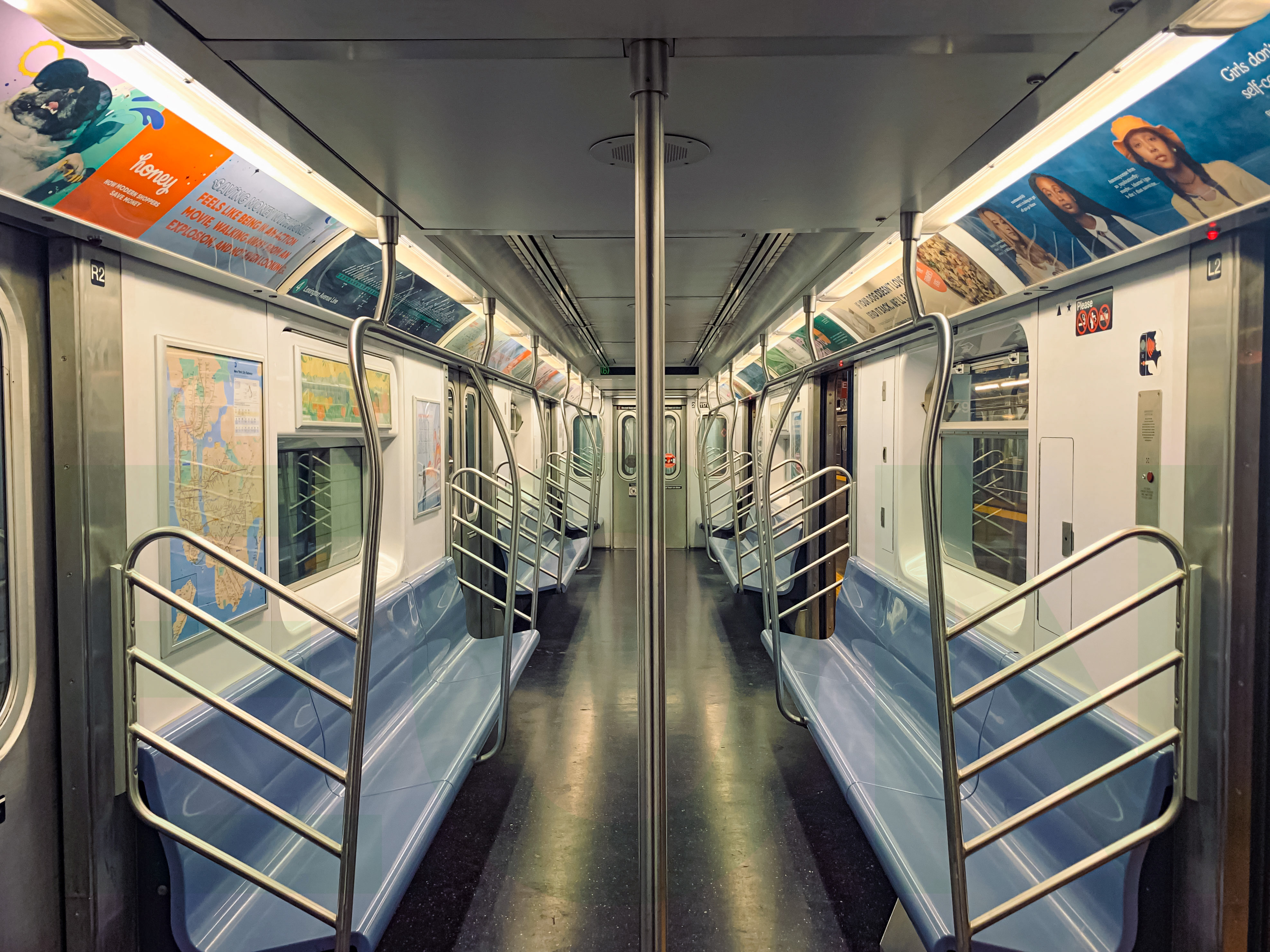
- Interior of an R142 car
- In service: July 10, 2000 – present (26 years)
- Manufacturer: Bombardier Transportation
- Built at: La Pocatière, Quebec, Canada + Barre, Vermont, US (final assembly: Plattsburgh, New York, US)
- Family name: NTT (new technology train)
- Replaced: All Redbirds (R26–R36)
- Constructed: 1999–2003
- Entered service: July 10, 2000 (revenue service testing); October 20, 2000 (official service)
- Number built: 1,030
- Number in service: 1,025
- Successor: R262
- Formation: 5-car sets (2 A cars and 3 B cars)
- Fleet numbers: 6301–7180; 1101–1250
- Capacity: 176 (A car); 188 (B car)
- Operator: New York City Subway
- Depots: 239th Street Yard (410 cars); East 180th Street Yard (410 cars); Jerome Yard (205 cars)
- Services assigned: (Updated June 30, 2024)

Specifications
- Car body construction: Stainless steel with fiberglass top end bonnets (some R142s use stainless steel bonnets)
- Train length: 513 ft 4 in (156.46 m) (10 car train); 256 ft 8 in (78.23 m) (5 car set)
- Car length: 51 ft 4 in (15.65 m)
- Width: 8 ft 9 1/2 in (2,680 mm)
- Height: 11 ft 10 2/3 in (3,624 mm)
- Floor height: 3 ft 7 3/4 in (1.11 m)
- Platform height: 3 ft 7 3/4 in (1.11 m)
- Entry: Level
- Doors: 6 sets of 54 inch wide side doors per car
- Maximum speed: 66 mph (110 km/h) (design); 55 mph (89 km/h) (service)
- Weight: 72,000 pounds (33,000 kg) (A car); 66,300 pounds (30,100 kg) (B car)
- Traction system: Alstom ONIX 800 IGBT–VVVF
- Traction motors: 2 or 4 (Note: 4 on A cars, 2 on B cars) × Alstom 4 LCA 1640 147.5 hp (110 kW) 3-phase AC induction motor
- Power output: 2,065.2 hp (1,540 kW) (5-car set)
- Acceleration: 2.5 mph/s (4.0 km/(h⋅s))
- Deceleration: 3.0 mph/s (4.8 km/(h⋅s)) (full service); 3.2 mph/s or 5.1 km/(h⋅s) (emergency)
- Auxiliaries: SAFT 195 AH battery (B car)
- Electric systems: Third rail, 625 V DC
- Current collection: Contact shoe
- Braking systems: Dynamic braking propulsion system; WABCO RT96 tread brake system
- Safety systems: dead man's switch, tripcock
- Headlight type: Halogen light bulb
- Track gauge: 4 ft 8 1/2 in (1,435 mm) standard gauge

The R142 is the first mass-produced model class of the newest generation or new technology (NTT) A Division cars for the New York City Subway. It was built by Bombardier Transportation in La Pocatière, Quebec, Canada and Barre, Vermont, U.S. with final assembly performed at Plattsburgh, New York, from 1999 to 2003. There are 880 cars numbered 6301–7180 and another 150 cars numbered 1101–1250, for a total of 1,030 cars, all arranged as five-car sets. Together with the R142As, they replaced the Redbird trains, including the R26, R28, R29, R33, R33S, and R36. As of 2025, the R142 is the most numerous subway car on the A Division (or IRT) of the New York City Subway.

The first R142s were delivered on November 16, 1999, though they initially experienced minor issues that were reported while undergoing testing. Following the completion of non-revenue service testing, the R142s were placed into revenue service on July 10, 2000, as part of its 30-day revenue acceptance test. After successful completion, it entered revenue service on October 20, 2000. The last R142s were delivered by mid-2003. In January 2019, the MTA proposed mid-life upgrades to the R142 fleet; however, as of 2026, the MTA expects to replace the R142s with the upcoming R262s.

== Description ==
880 of the R142s are numbered 6301–7180, and the remaining 150 cars are numbered 1101–1250.

There are two types of cars: "A" (cab at one end) and "B" (no cabs). "A" cars are powered with four traction motors each, with the passenger doors opposite each other. The "B" cars are powered by two traction motors at the number-two end, and the passenger doors are staggered (car ends are numbered on the lower body just above the truck). The trains are linked up in 5-car, A-B-B-B-A sets.

Currently, most R142s are assigned to the 239th Street Yard and East 180th Street Yard and run on the 2 and 5; the remaining sets are assigned to the Jerome Yard and run on the 4.

== Features ==
The R142s feature Alstom ONIX AC propulsion systems, electronic braking, automatic climate control, electronic strip maps, and an on-board intercom system; the traction motors of the R142s were later used on the majority of the R160 subway cars when they were first delivered. The R142 and the R142A were partly designed by Antenna Design.

Like the R110As, the R142s feature wider doors than past A-Division equipment, with 54-inch (1,372 mm) side doors (about 9 inches (229 mm) narrower than the R110As' 63-inch (1,600 mm) doors, but 4 inches (102 mm) wider than the R62/As' 50-inch (1,270 mm) doors). All car ends have windows, allowing passengers to see through to the next car, except cab ends, where the cab walls prevent such visibility. The R142 car bodies are constructed from stainless steel.

The R142s and R142As are the first New York City Subway cars to feature recorded announcements that were meant for long-term use. All passenger cars built after them also use this feature. Newer, shorter announcements have been tested on some sets on the 2 and 5 since 2015 in an effort to reduce dwell times and subsequently reduce the likelihood of delays, but were later replaced with the standard announcements. The R142s are visually very similar to the R142As and R188s, but due to electrical incompatibilities, the three types are not interoperable.

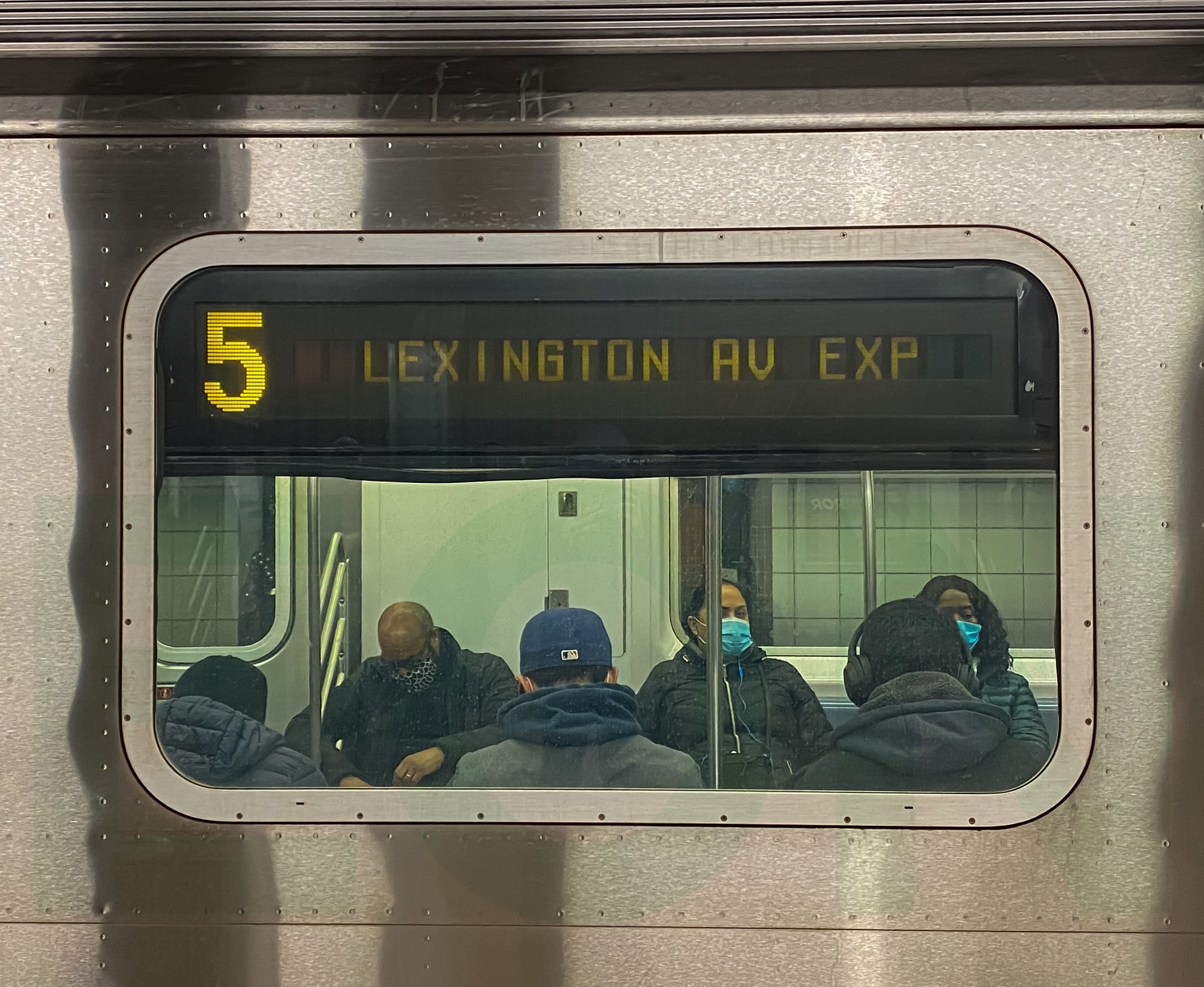
The LCD sign of an R142 car

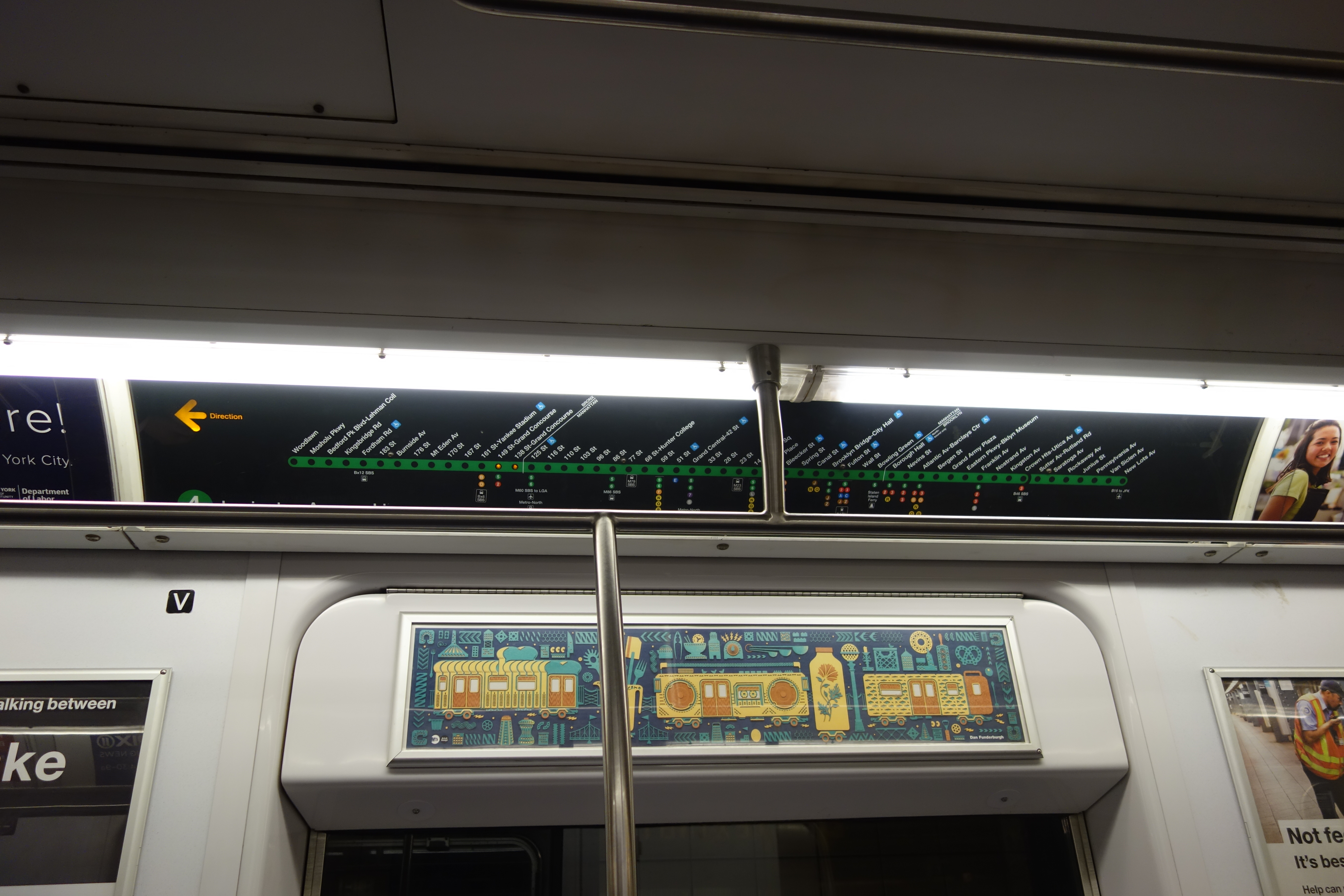
The electronic strip map in an R142 car

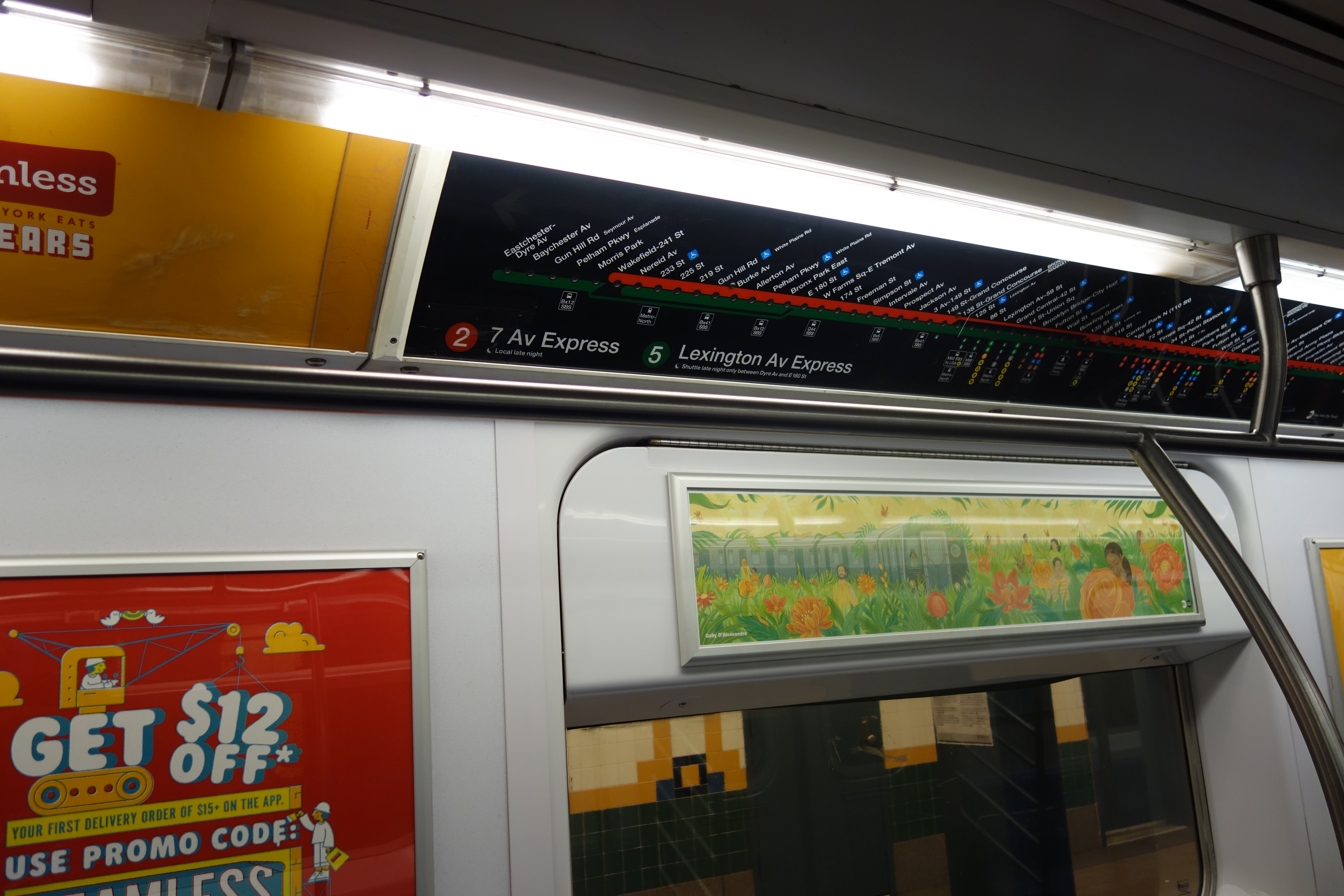
The updated strip map for the 2 and 5 trains

== History ==
On April 30, 1997, the Board of the Metropolitan Transportation Authority approved the purchase of 680 cars from Bombardier (the R142s) and 400 cars from Kawasaki (the R142As). The original purchase order was for 740 cars, but because of the intense competition between the firms, the MTA was able to purchase 340 additional cars at the same price. The entire cost of the purchase was $1.45 billion. The new subway cars were based on the results of the tests from the R110A and R110B test trains. The historic deal came after round-the-clock negotiations, and the contract was the largest subway car purchase in the history of the New York City Subway up to this point.

The first ten R142s, 6301–6310, were delivered on November 16, 1999. Minor issues were reported to be found and were corrected during troubleshooting during the testing phase. After several months of non-revenue service testing and troubleshooting of all bugs, the R142s were placed into revenue service on the 2 on July 10, 2000, as part of its 30-day revenue acceptance test. After successful completion, it entered revenue service on October 20, 2000. The first R142s assigned to the 5 started running on July 7, 2002. The last R142s were delivered by March 2003.

Between 2016 and 2018, the MTA replaced the individual strip maps for cars assigned to the 2 and 5 with combined strip maps showing both services, due to the two services having large amounts of route overlap on the IRT White Plains Road, Eastern Parkway, and Nostrand Avenue lines, and because the R142s assigned to the East 180th Street and 239th Street yards are shared between the two routes.

In January 2019, the MTA proposed mid-life upgrades to several train subsystems in the R142 and R142A fleets. These included changes to the HVAC, propulsion, and door systems; the addition of Ethernet on the R142 fleet; and conversion of the fleet to be compatible with communications-based train control (CBTC), in conjunction with subway signal upgrades along the IRT Lexington Avenue Line and IRT Seventh Avenue Line. The R142 fleet would also be retrofitted with a "monitoring and diagnostics system". However, on March 19, 2026, the MTA proposed an option order to the R262 order that if exercised, would replace all R142 and R142A cars.

In March 2021, the route and destination signs on car 7021 were upgraded to LEDs. The route portion of the sign also received a green circle/red diamond LED for the route display, similar to those on the R62A sets currently used on the 6 service. This signage upgrade has been implemented on additional cars since 2024.

=== Incidents ===
On March 27, 2020, a northbound 2 train with operating lead consist 6346–6350 and trailing consist 6366–6370 was set on fire while traveling from 96th Street to 110th Street–Malcolm X Plaza. While the trailing consist was relatively unscathed and eventually returned to service in November 2020, the lead consist suffered extensive damage and was retired. The fire erupted on board car 6347, damaging that car, as well as additional fire and smoke damage to the rest of the set, along with some moderate fire damage to the station as well. As a result, 6346–6350 were taken out of service and stripped for parts. The train operator was killed, and 16 people were injured. A man accused of setting the fire was arrested and charged with murder in December 2020.

On October 19, 2025, a southbound 4 train was en route to 149th Street–Grand Concourse when the link bar between two intermediate cars of the leading consist separated, specifically between cars 1218 and 1219 (the third and fourth cars) in consist 1216–1220, which subsequently split into two. No injuries were reported.

On December 9, 2025, a southbound 2 train was arriving at the 135th Street station when the link bar between two intermediate cars of the leading consist separated, specifically between cars 6362 and 6363 (the second and third cars) in consist 6361–6365, which split into two. No injuries were reported.

=== Replacement ===
In early 2026, the MTA announced it would be placing the order of 1,140 new R262 train cars to replace the current R62 and R62A fleet, with the option of 1,250 additional cars which if ordered, would replace the entire R142 fleet and the unconverted R142A cars by the early-to-mid 2030s.
