= Train of Many Colors =

New York City Subway excursion train

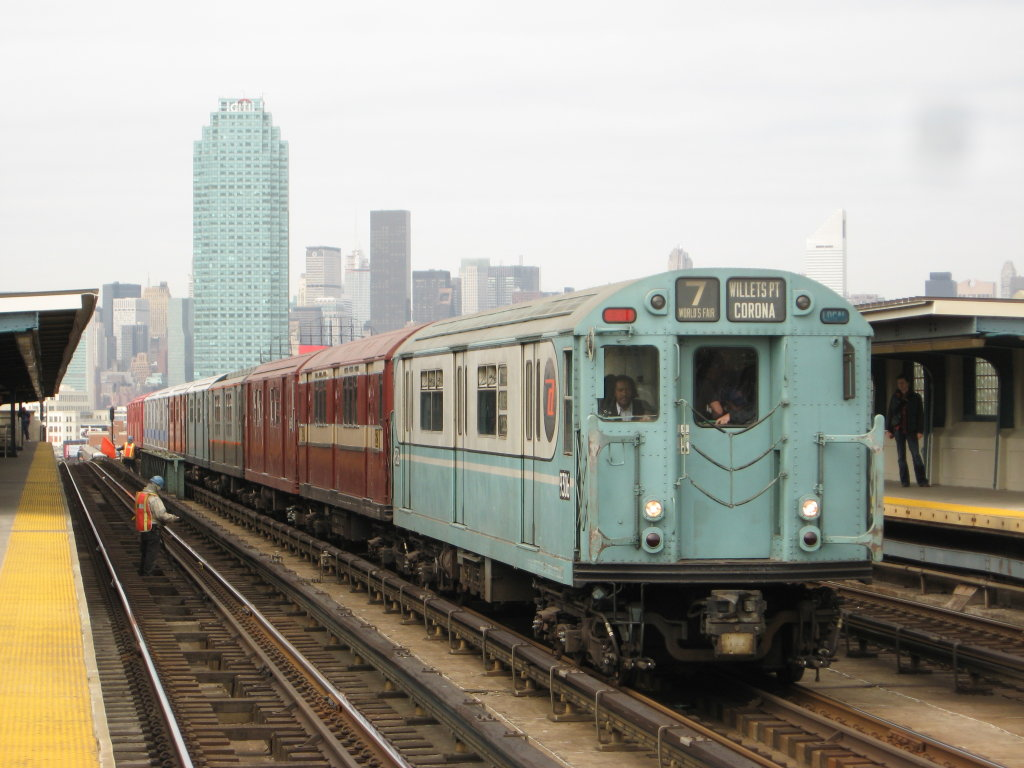
The Train of Many Colors running in service on the 7 train bypassing 40th Street–Lowery Street station, with R33S 9306 leading, taken in April 2008.

The Train of Many Colors (sometimes abbreviated as TOMC) is one of the New York Transit Museum's nostalgia trains used for A Division excursions, which is made up of cars that were formerly used on Interborough Rapid Transit Company (IRT) lines. The name comes from the fact that the cars are painted in many varying schemes from different eras.

During the 2004 Subway Centennial, some of the cars were used for regular service on the 42nd Street Shuttle route. In addition, the cars may be used to commemorate a special occasion (e.g. the opening of Citi Field in Queens).

Some of the cars are housed in the New York Transit Museum when not used for excursions (R12, R15, R17, and R33S). Others are stored at the 207th Street Yard.

The Train of Many Colors was used as the holiday train in 2022 running from Chambers Street to 137th Street–City College.

== List of cars and colors ==
The "Train of Many Colors" fleet consists of 19 cars painted in various schemes, as listed below: not all of them run at the same time.

Model	Builder	Car numbers	Livery	Era used
R12	American Car & Foundry	5760	Two tone gray with orange stripes	Original, when new
R15	American Car & Foundry	6239	Maroon with tan stripe	Original, when new
R17	St. Louis Car Company	6609	Maroon	Original, when new
R33	St. Louis Car Company	9010–9011	Silver with blue stripe ("Platinum Mist")	1971–early 1980s
R33	St. Louis Car Company	9016–9017	Watermelon/"Tartar" red with yellow handlebars	Original, when new
R33	St. Louis Car Company	9068–9069; 9206–9207	Tuscan/"Gunn" red with silver roof ("Redbird")	1986 to retirement
R33S	St. Louis Car Company	9306–9308	1964 World's Fair aqua blue and white ("Bluebird")	Original, when new
R33S	St. Louis Car Company	9310	Tuscan/"Gunn" red with silver roof ("Redbird")	1984 to retirement
R36	St. Louis Car Company	9542–9543; 9586–9587	Tuscan/"Gunn" red with silver roof ("Redbird")	1984 to retirement
