= R262 (New York City Subway car) =

Proposed New York City Subway car

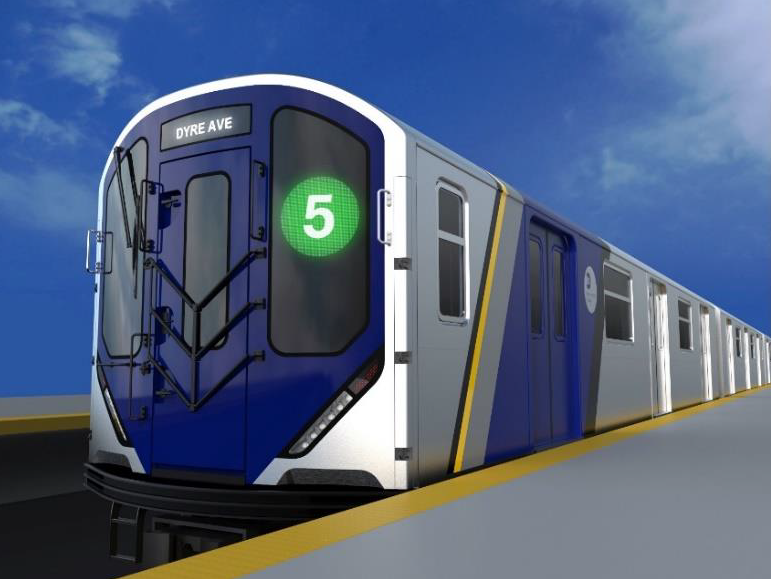
- Rendering of the proposed R262 on the 5
- In service: Early 2030s (expected)
- Manufacturer: TBA
- Replaced: All R62s, R62As, R142s, and R142As (expected)
- Number under construction: 1,140 (base order); 2,390 (including option order)
- Number built: 0
- Formation: 5-car sets
- Operator: New York City Subway

Specifications
- Train length: 5-car train: 256 feet (78 m); 10-car train: 512 feet (156 m)
- Car length: 51.2 feet (15.6 m)
- Doors: 6 sets of 58 inches (150 cm) wide side doors per car
- Electric systems: Third rail, 625 V DC
- Current collection: Contact shoe
- Track gauge: 4 ft 8 1/2 in (1,435 mm) standard gauge

The R262 is a proposed New Technology Train-series subway car for the New York City Subway. It is expected to replace the current R62, R62A, R142, and R142A rolling stock, which are used on the subway's A Division. The order was first proposed in the late 2010s, and a request for proposal (RFP) was issued by Metropolitan Transportation Authority (MTA) in March 2026. If all options are exercised, the contract could be the largest rolling stock contract ever issued by the MTA, with up to 2,390 R262 subway cars replacing over 35% of the existing subway fleet, making it the largest fleet order in New York City Subway history.

== Component orders ==
The R262 order is divided into a base order and an option order. The base order consists of 1,140 cars, and the option order consists of 1,250 cars. As of 19 March 2026, the Metropolitan Transportation Authority (MTA) has expressed interest in 2,390 total cars. The R262 order will consist of cars in 5-car sets for the mainline IRT and for the 42nd Street Shuttle. The MTA's 2025-2029 Capital Program contains funding for the base order of R262s, while the option order will be funded in a future capital plan. The base order of the contract would replace over 17% of the subway fleet, and over 35% of the existing subway fleet if all 2,390 subway cars were ordered.

== Features ==
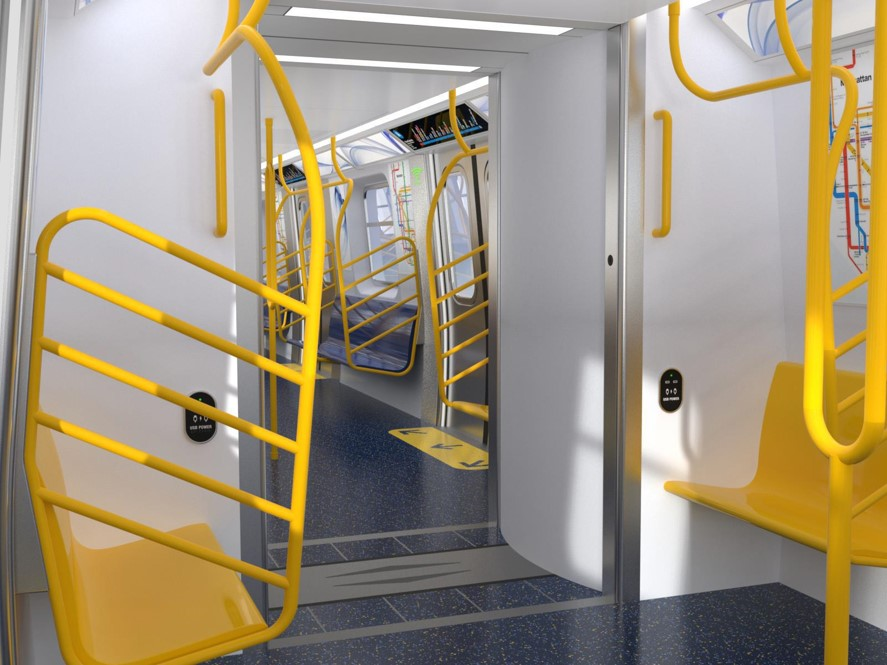
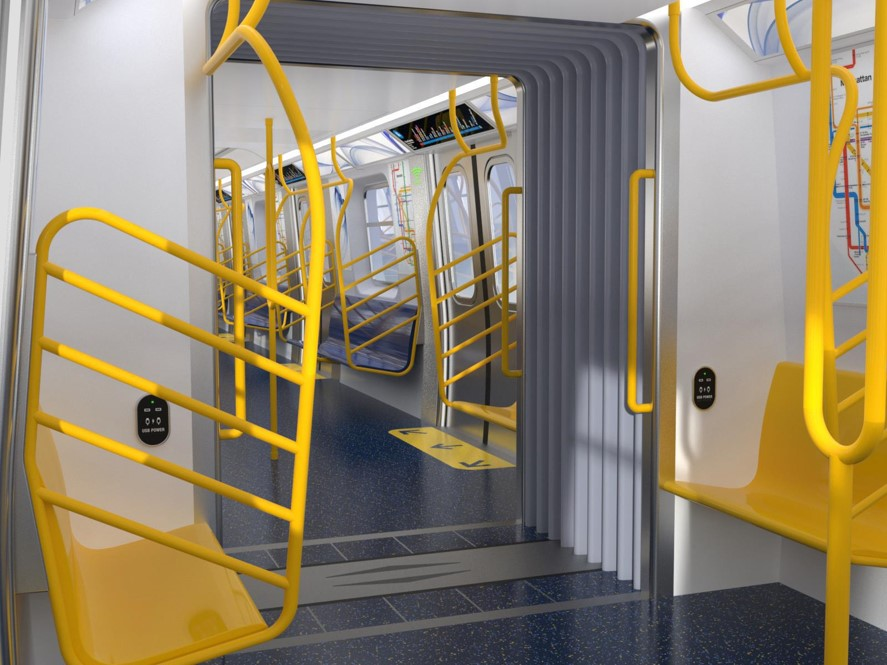
The R262OGs will have open gangways, similar to the R211Ts. Shown above are two possible options for the gangway connection.

The design of the R262 subway cars is based on the specifications of the R211 cars, which are for the B Division. They will have modern signage and communication, an Ethernet network, and updated crash energy management standards. The R262s will also adopt open-gangways with the "R262OG" variant, allowing passengers to move between cars during train movement. They will be equipped with communications-based train control (CBTC). Unlike the R211s, R262s will have additional audio induction loops for riders with hearing impairments. Other new features include automatic passenger counters and electronic braking controls.

Like the R211s, these subway cars will have a blue front with large windows, LED headlights, and a blue strip with gold accents on the sides, similar to the new MTA Regional Bus Operations livery debuted in 2016. To designate the route, a large LED screen with the route bullet will be displayed at the ends of the train. The train's destination will be displayed above the door on the front. The cars will most likely be 51.2 feet (15.6 m) long. The R262 will have an Mean Distance Between Failure (MDBF) requirement of 200,000 miles (320,000 km), a substantial increase on the average 89,000-mile (143,000 km) MDBF of the R62/R62A trains.

== History ==
On January 22, 2019, the MTA announced that it would order a fleet of approximately 1,500 subway cars in future capital programs allowing the agency to accelerate its plans to install CBTC on the IRT Lexington Avenue Line as part of the Fast Forward Plan. Because the 1,139 R62 and R62A subway cars do not have necessary equipment and network infrastructure to become CBTC-equipped, the agency decided to order a new fleet of CBTC-equipped cars to replace them.

On September 16, 2019, the MTA released its 2020–2024 Capital Program, including funding to purchase approximately 900 A Division subway cars, with $1.5 billion provided for a base order, and $1.4 billion for an option to purchase additional A Division cars. The document also stated that the production of additional A Division subway cars would be part of the future 2025–2029 Capital Program.

In January 2020, the New York City Transit (NYCT) sent a request to the MTA Board, asking for permission to forgo competitive bidding for the contract and issue a request for proposals (RFP) for the order, which would now consist of 1,364 cars with all options exercised, instead of approximately 1,500 cars. In addition, NYCT asked the Board to approve a modification to the agency's contract with CH2M Hill (now Jacobs) for consulting services for the R211 subway car order, extending its term by a year so consulting services for the R262 order could be completed as under the same contract. In late February 2020, the MTA issued the RFP, and initially planned to award the contract in early 2021.

In July 2022, the MTA proposed deferring funding for the order to a future capital program, citing delays in railcar production caused by industry supply chain and labor issues following the COVID-19 pandemic, and subsequent restrictions in supplier capacity. This, concurrent with deferment of installation of CBTC on the IRT Lexington Avenue Line, would free up funding for other projects in the Capital Program. In June 2023, the MTA issued a Request for Proposals for pre-contract award consultants on the R262 and R268 subway car orders for a two-year period. A subsequent amendment to the Capital Program proposed later that month would decrease the amount of remaining funding for the base order to $1.05 billion, and possibly instead redirect funding to order additional B Division subway cars or retrofit existing A Division cars with CBTC equipment.

On May 7, 2025, the MTA issued an request for information (RFI) seeking information from companies with experience constructing and designing open gangway systems for train cars on how gangways could be applied to a portion of the 1,140-car R262 order. The MTA subsequently requested an industry review of the technical specifications of the R262 fleet, mainly focusing on improving system standardization and reducing the total cost of owning the cars. Possible changes included lighter exterior car shells, and cab safety improvements to reduce break-ins.

On March 19, 2026, the MTA issued a request for proposals (RFP) in search for manufacturers and also once again updated the R262 car order. While the base order still features 1,140 cars to replace the R62/R62A fleet, the option order was expanded to 1,250 cars to replace the R142/R142A fleet. Both orders will contain a mixture of regular "closed-end" R262s and open-gangway R262s named the "R262OG". Bidding began on April 30, 2026, and the contract is expected to be awarded in early 2028. These cars will be assigned on all the mainline A Division routes except the 7. Following the RFI, the MTA amended the proposed contract to make the majority of the specifications performance-based rather using specific design requirements, thereby allowing rolling stock manufacturers to propose alternative approaches to meet the contract. The total cost of ownership over the lifetime of the contract will also be considered. If fully executed, the R262 contract would be the largest order of rolling stock ever made by the MTA.
