= R12 (New York City Subway car) =

Retired class of New York City Subway car

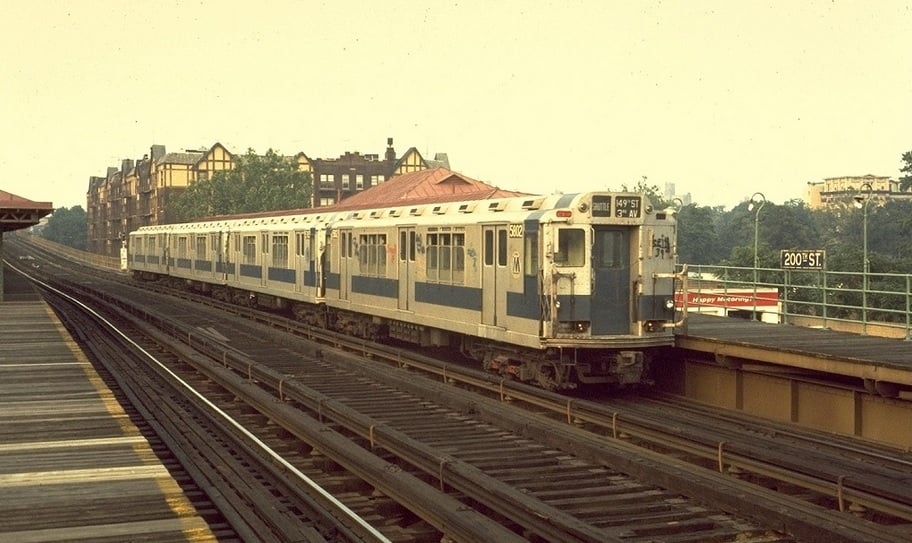
- R12s in service on the 8 in 1972

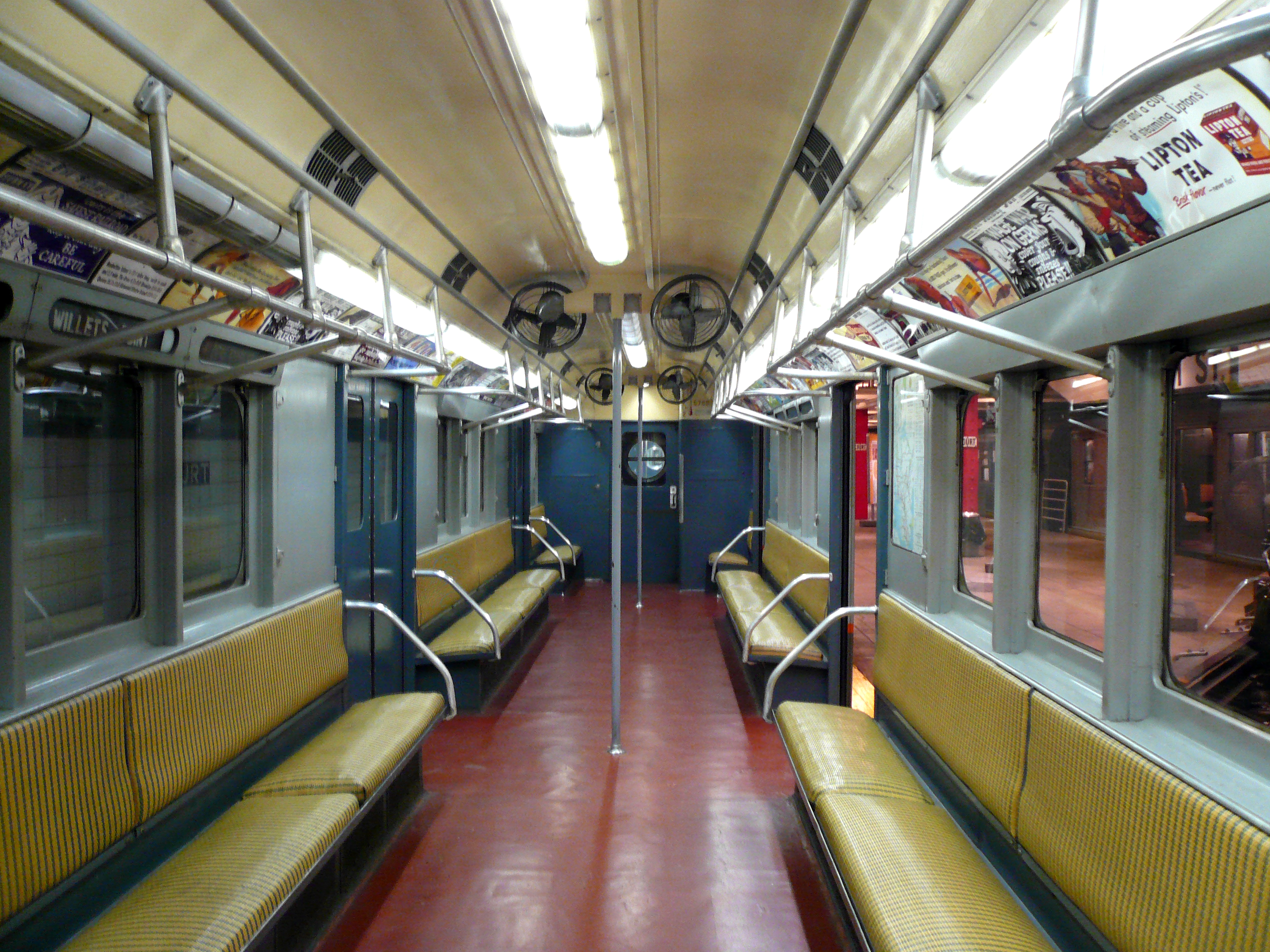
- Interior view of R12 car 5760
- In service: July 13, 1948 – August 1981 (33 years)
- Manufacturer: American Car and Foundry Company
- Built at: Berwick, Pennsylvania, USA
- Constructed: 1948
- Entered service: July 13, 1948
- Number built: 100
- Number preserved: 2
- Number scrapped: 98
- Successor: R62
- Formation: Single units
- Fleet numbers: 5703–5752 (Westinghouse); 5753–5802 (General Electric)
- Capacity: 44 (seated)
- Operators: NYC Board of Transportation; New York City Subway

Specifications
- Car body construction: LAHT Carbon steel
- Car length: 51 ft (15.54 m)
- Width: 8 ft 9.5 in (2,680 mm)
- Height: 11 ft (3,353 mm)
- Platform height: 3.76 ft (1.15 m)
- Doors: 6 sets of 50 inch wide side doors per car
- Maximum speed: 55 mph (89 km/h)
- Weight: 73,100 lb (33,158 kg)
- Traction system: General Electric 1240A3 or Westinghouse J1447C
- Power output: 100 hp (75 kW)
- Braking systems: WABCO A1 "SMEE" Braking System, A.S.F. simplex unit cylinder clasp tread brake
- Safety system: Tripcock
- Track gauge: 4 ft 8 1/2 in (1,435 mm) standard gauge

The R12 was a New York City Subway car built by the American Car and Foundry Company in 1948. A total of 100 cars were built, arranged as single units. Two versions were manufactured: Westinghouse (WH)-powered cars and General Electric (GE)-powered cars.

The R12s were the first post-war city-owned rolling stock for the IRT A Division. The first of these entered service on July 13, 1948; the fleet initially ran on the IRT Flushing Line until the R33S and R36 World's Fair fleets were delivered in the 1960s. The R12s were retired in the early 1980s due to service reductions prior to the delivery of the R62 fleet in the mid-1980s, and the final train of R12s ran in September 1981. Two R12 cars were saved for the New York Transit Museum, while the rest were scrapped.

== Description ==
The R12s were numbered 5703–5802. They were the first mass-produced cars to feature electric door motors, as opposed to air-powered door motors (The R11/R34 prototypes were the very first cars with such features).

The R12 was the first series of post-war subway cars for the IRT division, and the second series of post-war rolling stock overall, following the R10s built around the same time for the IND/BMT B Division. The two car types were very similar to each other, except that the R12s were smaller since they were built to meet A Division specifications.

The R12s were the first "R" type contract order built for the A Division (referring to the practice of naming a car class by the letter "R" – which stands for rapid transit – followed by a number derived from the actual contract number). This practice originated from the R1 order built for the Independent Subway System. After the merger of the IRT, BMT, and IND in 1940, all subsequent subway car orders would follow the R contract.

There were two versions of the R12s: Westinghouse Electric (WE)-powered cars (5703–5752) and General Electric (GE)-powered cars (5753–5802).

The R12s bore several schemes during their service lives. The cars were delivered in two-tone gray scheme with orange stripes, then a solid bright red, and finally, repainted into the MTA's silver with blue stripe scheme. In the mid-1960s, 5707 received an interior speckled green paint scheme.

Cars 5703–5737 had a different fluorescent tubing that permitted a brighter illumination than most later cars of this series, although 5742, 5756, and 5784 also received this (as well as R14 5904).

== History ==
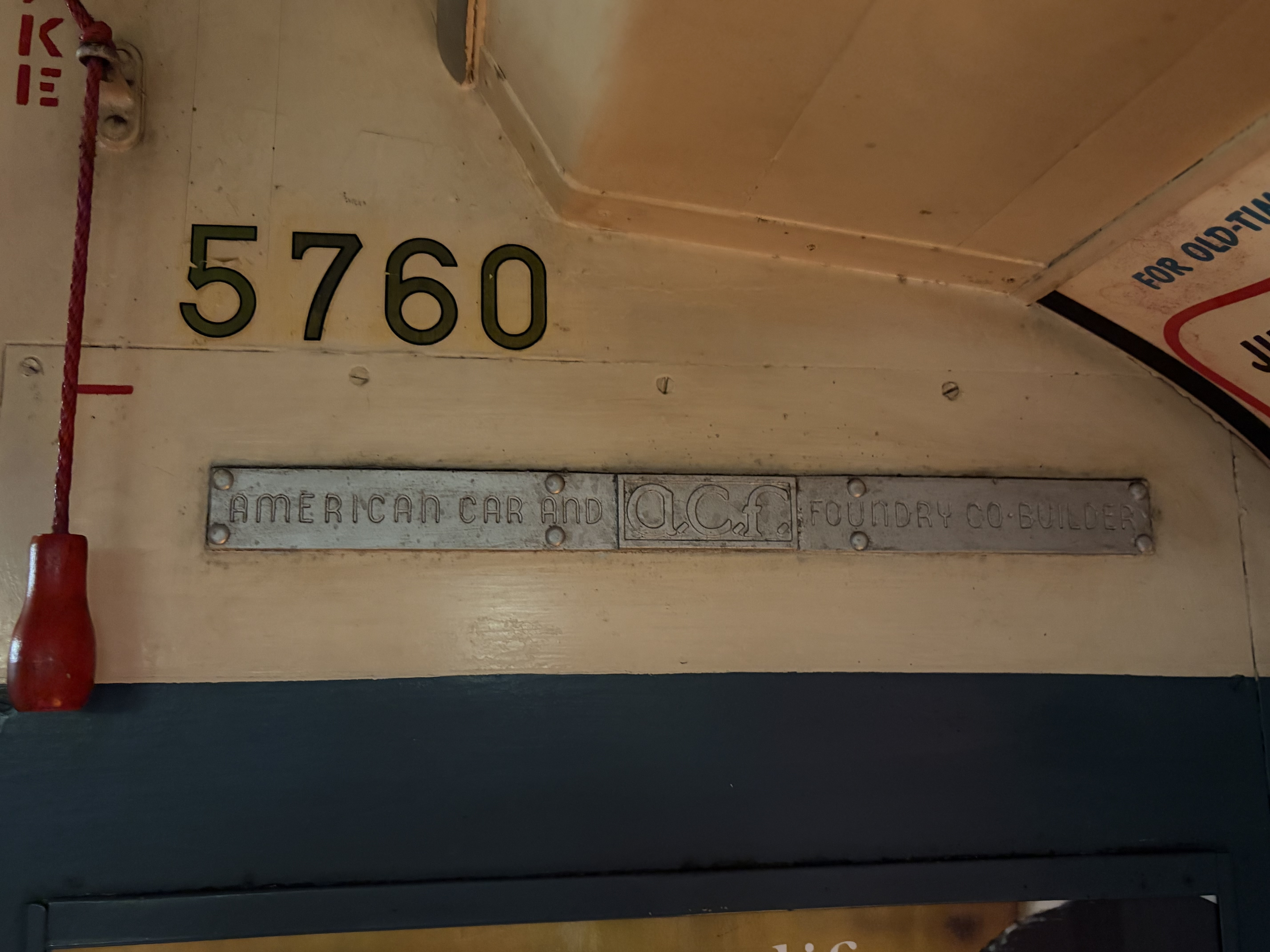
Builders plate of the R12 cars

Delivery of the cars began in June 1948. The first R12s began service on the 7 (IRT Flushing Line) on July 13, 1948. All 100 cars were delivered by October 1948.

The R12s ran on the Flushing Line until the arrival of the R33Ss and R36 World's Fairs in late 1963–early 1964. The R12s were then transferred to operate on other A-division routes. One particular assignment included all GE-powered cars being heavily modified (by deactivating the dynamic brakes and cutting out the third (parallel) notch on their controllers) and sent to the 8 (Third Avenue elevated line) in the Bronx during August 1969 and running there until that route's closing on April 29, 1973, whereupon they were permanently removed from passenger service and relegated to work service after only a little under 25 years in passenger service. A "3" was placed in front of the numbers of the cars so placed in work service. In addition, four Westinghouse-powered R12 cars (5703–5706) were slightly modified for use on the Bowling Green–South Ferry Shuttle, and were so-equipped so that the center door of each car could be opened at South Ferry, while keeping the others closed. These cars were used until the shuttle was discontinued on February 12, 1977, when the cars were reassigned to the 3, since these four shuttle cars were inspected and maintained at Livonia Barn at the time, with the 3 route.

=== Retirement ===
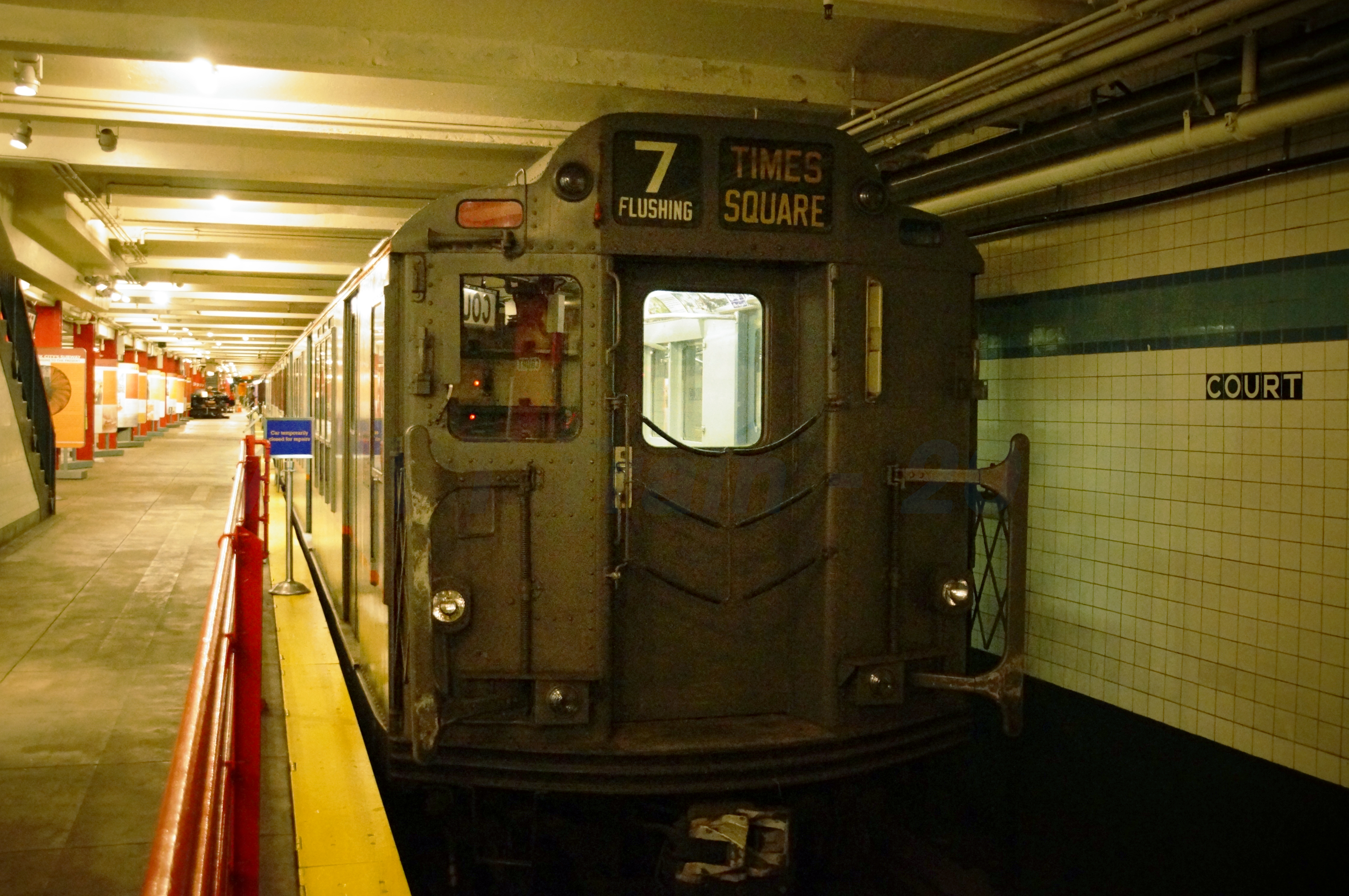
R12 car 5760 on display at the New York Transit Museum

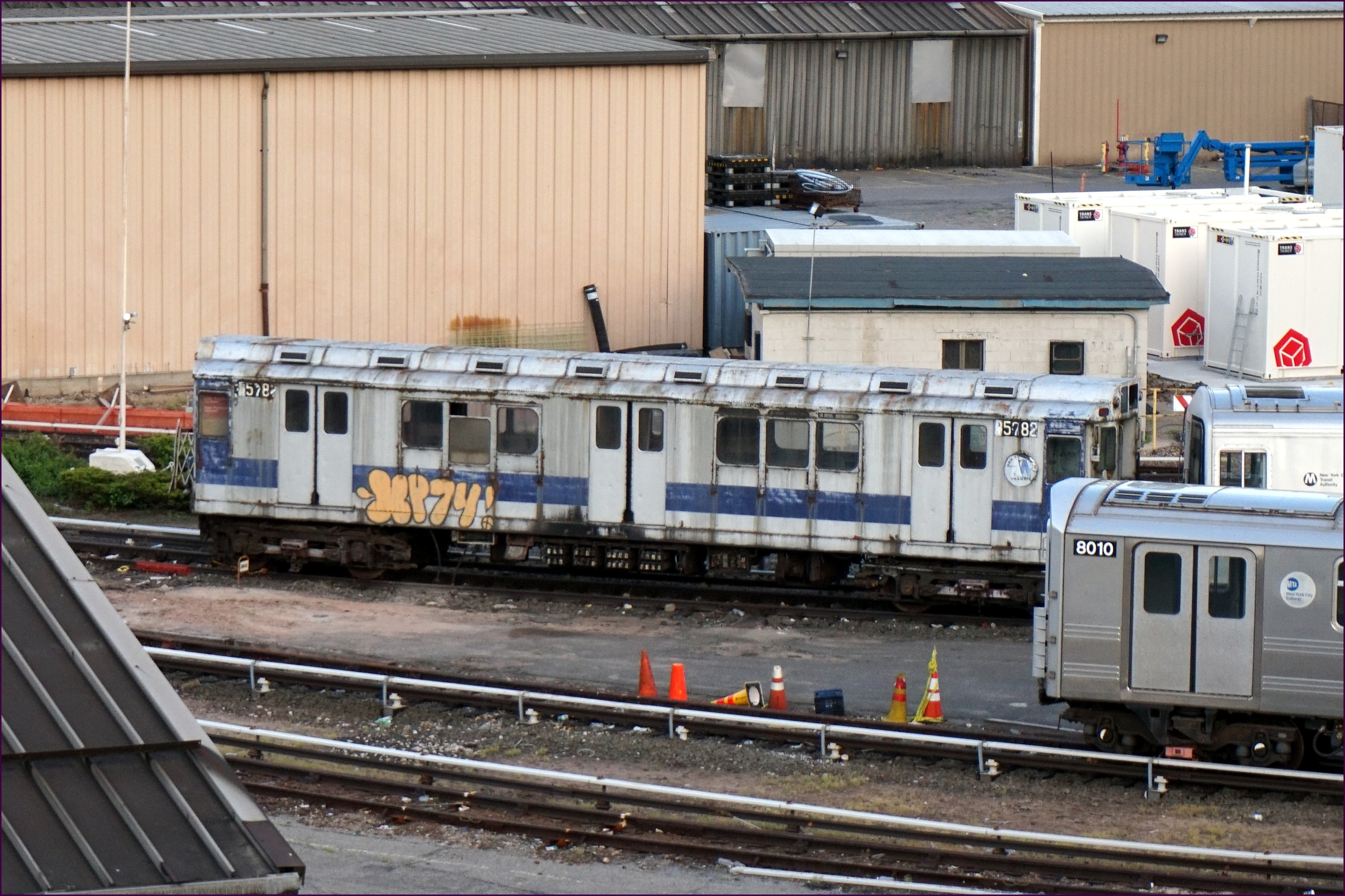
R12 car 5782 (renumbered to 35782) stored at 207th Street Yard

As newer cars started to run on the MTA's many lines, the R12s were in a state of disrepair. In the 1970s, graffiti artists vandalized many subway cars, including the R12s. Although officially replaced by the R62s (delivered 1983–85), all R12s were retired earlier. Many R12s were also converted to work service following their retirement to replace older Low-V work cars. The last R12 was pulled from passenger service in August 1981. All but two cars have since been taken off property to be scrapped, though several cars lasted as training vehicles or work cars for many years.

Two cars have been preserved:

- Car 5760 has been preserved by the New York Transit Museum since July 1976, and was repainted into its original two-tone gray and orange striped paint scheme. The car is operational and has run on museum-sponsored nostalgia trains, specifically on the Train of Many Colors.
- Car 5782 (renumbered to 35782) is also being held for the New York Transit Museum. This car was formerly used for fire training. The car retains its MTA blue/silver livery paint scheme and has been stored at 207th Street Yard for many years.
