= R36 (New York City Subway car) =

Retired class of New York City Subway car

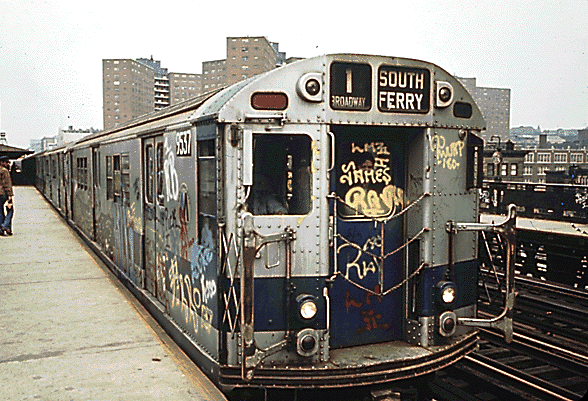
- A "Main Line" R36 train covered in graffiti on the 1 train at 125th Street in September 1973

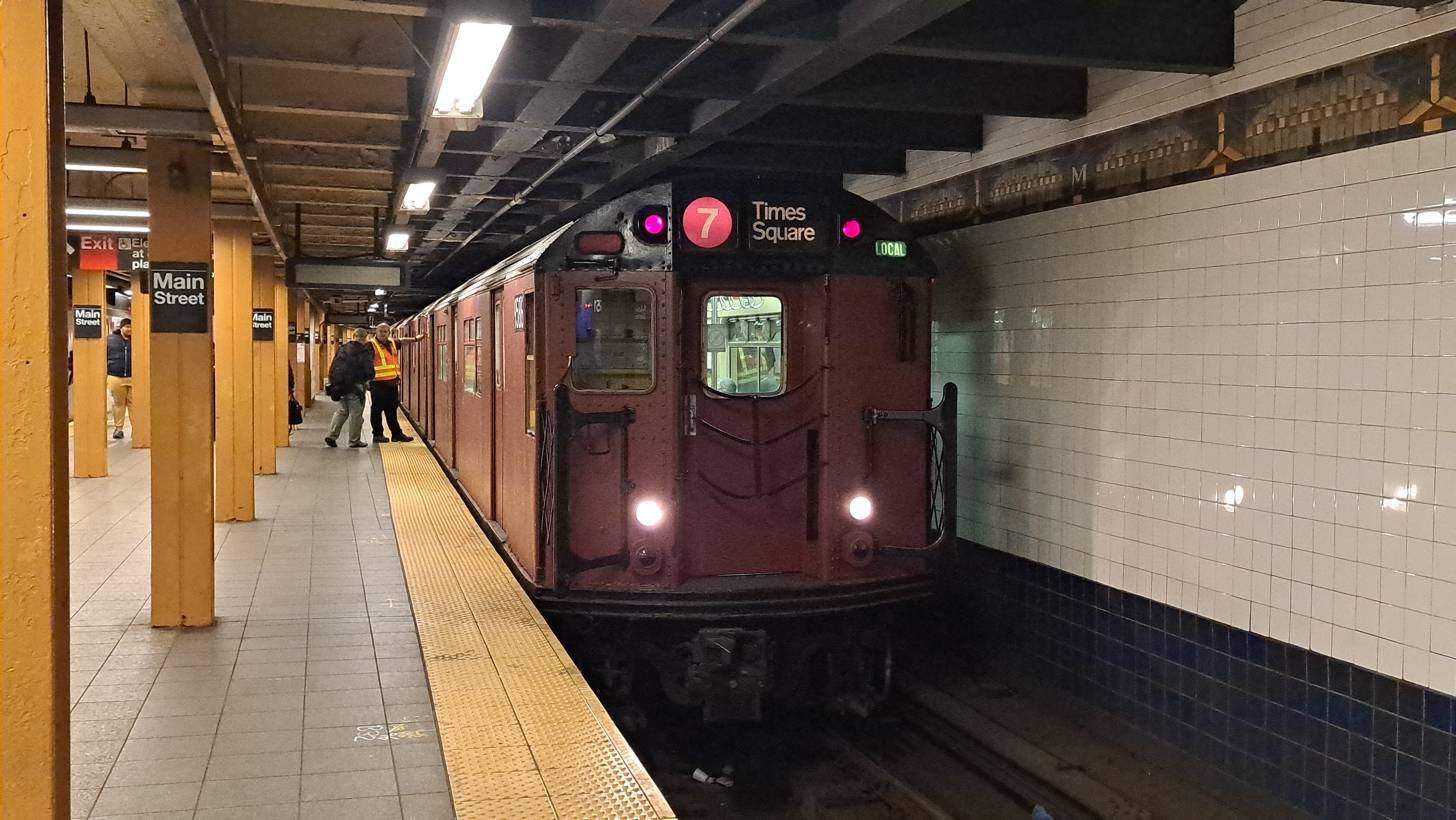
- A "World's Fair" R36 train leaving Flushing-Main Street after being used for the movie Caught Stealing in 2024
- In service: October 24, 1963 – November 3, 2003 (40 years)
- Manufacturer: St. Louis Car Company
- Built at: St. Louis, Missouri, United States
- Family name: Redbirds
- Replaced: Many Steinway Lo-Vs and Standard Lo-Vs
- Constructed: 1963–1964
- Entered service: 1963
- Refurbished: 1981–1986
- Scrapped: 2001–2003
- Number built: 424; 34 ("Main Line"); 390 ("World's Fair")
- Number preserved: 4
- Number scrapped: 420; 32 ("Main Line"); 384 ("World's Fair"); 4 ("World's Fair") in storage
- Successor: R142 and R142A
- Formation: Married Pairs
- Fleet numbers: 9346–9523, 9558–9769 ("World's Fair"); 9524–9557 ("Main Line")
- Capacity: 44 (seated)
- Operator: New York City Subway

Specifications
- Car body construction: LAHT (Low Alloy High Tensile steel)
- Car length: 51.04 feet (15.56 m)
- Width: 8.75 feet (2,667 mm)
- Height: 11.86 feet (3,615 mm)
- Doors: 6 sets of 50 inch wide side doors per car
- Weight: 69,400 lb (31,500 kg) (pre-rebuild); 72,000 lb (33,000 kg) (rebuild units)
- Traction system: 9346–9557: Westinghouse XCA248; 9558–9769: General Electric 17KG192 with Westinghouse (WH) 1447C or General Electric (GE) 1240A5 DC motors (4/car, 100 hp or 75 kW)
- Traction motors: Westinghouse 1447C motors (4/car)
- Power output: 4 x 100 hp (75 kW)
- Acceleration: 2.5 mph/s (4.0 km/(h⋅s))
- Deceleration: 3.0 mph/s (4.8 km/(h⋅s))
- Auxiliaries: Motor-generator and battery set (WH YX304E, GE 5GMG 153LI)
- Electric system: 600 V DC Third rail
- Current collection: Contact shoe
- Braking systems: WABCO, "SMEE" (electrodynamic)
- Safety system: emergency brakes
- Track gauge: 4 ft 8 1/2 in (1,435 mm) standard gauge

The R36 was a New York City Subway car model built by the St. Louis Car Company from 1963 to 1964. The cars are a "follow-up" or supplemental stock to the A Division's R33s, which some of the cars closely resemble. A total of 424 cars were built, arranged in pairs. The order includes World's Fair cars comprising 390 cars, and Main Line cars comprising 34 cars.

The R36s entered service on October 24, 1963, and were overhauled in the mid-1980s. They were retired by 2003 with the delivery of the R142 and R142A cars. While most cars were reefed, some have been preserved, and others have been retained for other purposes.

== Description ==
The R36s were numbered 9346–9769. They were the last entirely LAHT bodied (non-stainless steel) cars built for the New York City Subway.

Cars 9346–9523 and 9558–9769 were specifically purchased for service on the IRT Flushing Line (7 and <7> trains), which was the closest line to the 1964 New York World's Fair. The cars were also referred to as "World's Fair" cars, or R36WFs (R36 World's Fair), and featured three-piece curved "picture" windows, unlike other IRT cars at the time. While in regular service, five two-car consists of these cars were coupled to one single R33S car to make 11-car trains for the 7.

Cars 9524–9557 were purchased for service on all other IRT routes. The cars were also referred to as "Main Line" cars, or R36MLs (R36 Main Line) to distinguish them from the "World's Fair" cars. They were built from unfinished car body shells of the R33 order, and therefore featured sported drop-sash side windows.

Although the R36s were later referred to as Redbirds, the cars were originally painted in different schemes when they were delivered. The "World's Fair" cars were painted in a light blue turquoise "Bluebird" scheme, while the "Main Line" cars were painted bright red like the R33s. These color schemes were used until 1977, when the cars were painted in the silver/blue MTA livery. Then, they were painted in a full white (roof, bonnets, and sides were all painted white) "anti-graffiti" scheme from 1981 to 1982 to combat graffiti; since the white paint was a Teflon-based paint, the graffiti did not stick to it very well. The look was abandoned for the famous "Redbird" style, which was applied onto the cars when they were rebuilt.

== History ==
=== Early history ===
In 1962, the New York City Transit Authority (NYCTA) ordered 430 cars for the 7 train. This route would run to the World's Fair grounds in Flushing Meadows in Queens. The first 40 cars were singles (R33S), with the rest being R36 cars; single cars were needed since the 7 service runs 11-car trains, and R36 cars were built only in pairs.

The first R36 cars ("World's Fair" cars 9558–9561) arrived in fall 1963, shortly after the R33S cars began arriving in September that year. The first train of R33S and "World's Fair" R36 cars was placed in service on the 7 route on October 24, 1963. With the fair opening approaching on April 12, 1964, "World's Fair" R36 cars were built and delivered in larger quantities that fall. More "World's Fair" cars arrived throughout 1964, enough to displace the R12s, R14s, and R15s from the 7 train by the close of 1964.

The "Main Line" R36s entered service on the 4 almost a year later, on July 24, 1964. The cars were first assigned to the 2, 4, and 5 until February 16, 1966, when they were moved to the 6.

=== Late 1960s–Mid 1980s ===
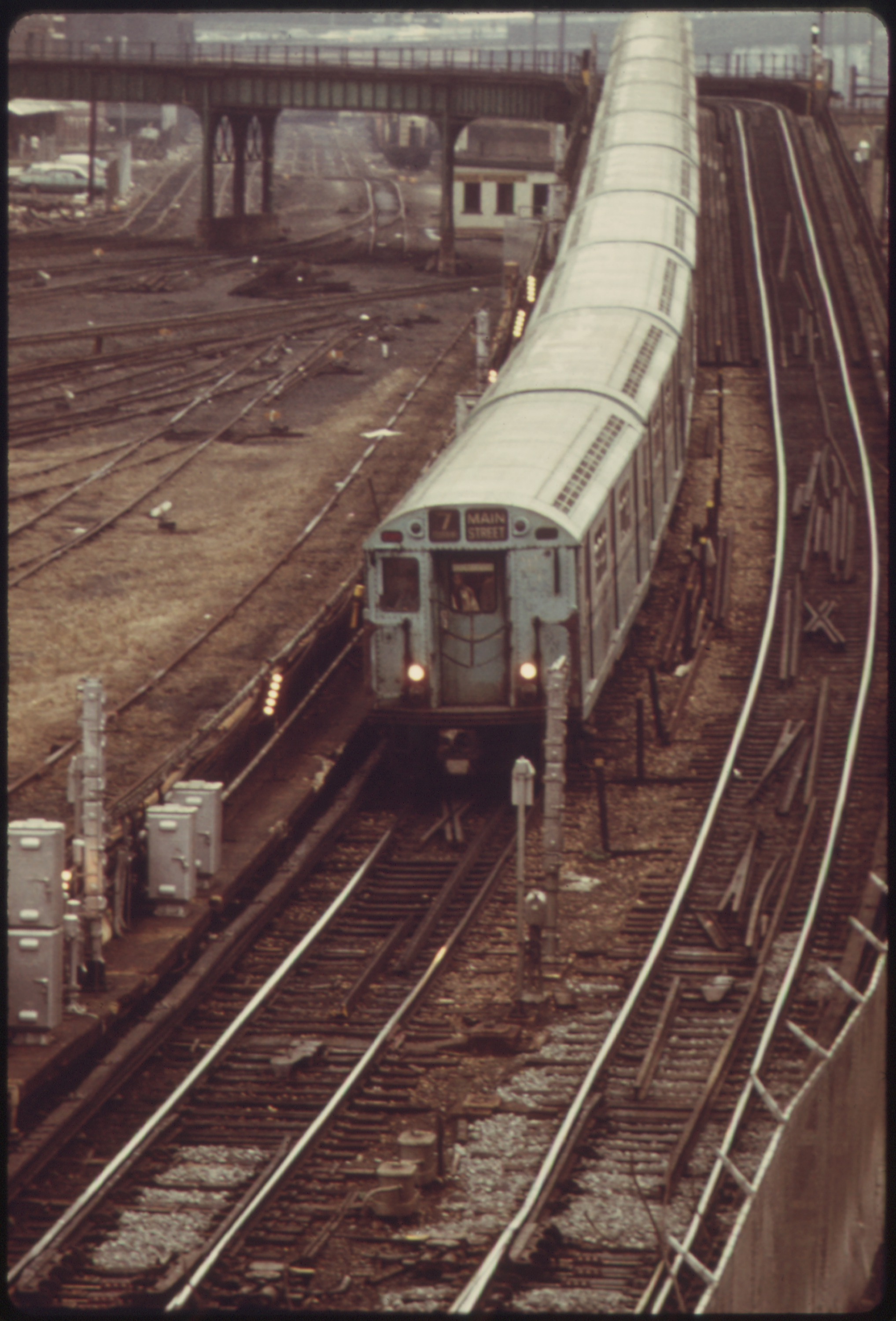
R36 cars as well as R33S cars in service on the 7 in 1974

The "Main Line" R36s stayed on the 6 until October 1968, when cars 9530–9539 were moved to the 1 and 3. When the GE R12s were sent to the 8 (Third Avenue elevated line) in August 1969, the remaining cars assigned to the 6 were moved to the 1 and 3 to join the rest of the "Main Line" cars assigned there.

In April 1972, "Main Line" R36 pairs 9524–9525, 9532–9533, 9536–9537, 9540–9541, 9544–9545, and 9548–9549 were moved to the 7, with Westinghouse "World's Fair" pairs 9376–9377, 9408–9409, 9418–9419, 9474–9475, 9496–9497, and 9516–9517 being moved to the 1 and 3. The swap was reversed in May 1973, when the "Main Line" pairs returned to the 1 and 3, and the Westinghouse "World's Fair" pairs returned to the 7.

On October 22, 1976, Westinghouse "World's Fair" R36s 9504–9523 were moved from the 7 to the 1 and 3 to supplement the "Main Line" cars.

From June 2, 1978, to May 1979, Westinghouse "World's Fair" R36s 9494–9503 were assigned to the 4 train. Those cars were also used on the 2 and 5 in February 1979.

On April 27, 1981, "Main Line" R36s 9548–9557 were moved from the 1 and 3 to the 7 to relieve a car shortage on the line. The cars returned to their home lines on August 17, 1981.

On January 10, 1983, Westinghouse "World's Fair" R36s 9504–9523 and the "Main Line" R36s were removed from the 1, and those were only assigned to the 3. Those cars stayed on the 3 until June 20, 1984, when Westinghouse "World's Fair" and "Main Line" cars 9514–9533 were moved to the 7. The remaining Westinghouse "World's Fair" R36s assigned to the 3 were then moved to the 7 on July 5, 1984. Then, the last "Main Line" cars assigned to the 3 were also moved to the 7 on February 15, 1985, and the R36s were assigned exclusively to the 7, except from April 1985 to early May 1985, when "Main Line" cars 9534–9557, and "World's Fair" GE cars 9558–9593 were all assigned to the 4.

=== Rebuilding ===
Though all cars were originally delivered without air conditioning, all cars in this series gradually received air conditioning as part of a retrofitting program to replace the cars' original Axiflow ceiling fans. The program started in 1976, and by 1982, all cars had received air conditioning as part of the program.

The "World's Fair" R36s were the first cars to be rebuilt in the NYCTA's General Overhaul Program (GOH) in the 1980s. This program improved car life by rebuilding older cars and keeping other cars in a state of good repair. A trial rebuild program was done on selected Westinghouse R36 cars in 1981–83; the selected cars were rebuilt by Morrison–Knudsen in Hornell, New York. Beginning in late 1984, the other R36 cars were rebuilt at a rate of 200 cars per year, with the majority of them done in-house at the Coney Island Shop. Others were rebuilt by General Electric in Buffalo, New York, and by Amtrak at its Beech Grove, Indiana, and Wilmington, Delaware shops. The last remaining cars were sent out for rebuild in late 1985, and by 1986, all cars were back in service.

After rebuilding, the R36 cars were repainted in a scheme involving a deep maroon red body, black front bonnets and anti-climbers, and a silver roof prior to returning to service. At first, the scheme was known as "Silver Fox", "Broad Street Red", or "Gunn Red" (after NYCT chief David L. Gunn) and was a graffiti-resistant red. By 1989, the Gunn Red would evolve into the "Redbirds" scheme best known to many New Yorkers, with beige interiors, red exterior paint and interior doors and black, and silver exterior trim along with the car windows, roof, and undersides.

Starting in late 1992, R36 cars 9558–9769 underwent another overhaul to improve their reliability that involved some cosmetic improvements, extensive rewiring, and the installment of donor cam control group and braking systems that were salvaged from the retiring R30 cars. As the R36s were among the first group of subway cars to undergo a trial refurbishment before the General Overhaul (GOH) program began in 1985, there were some oversights and shortcomings that occurred before the GOH program took place which were essentially corrected by this second overhaul.

In 1999, the R36 cars were the most reliable in the NYCT fleet, with a Mean Distance Between Failure (MDBF) rate of 194,150 miles, despite being 35 years old at the time. While in decent shape mechanically, rust holes and car body corrosion were beginning to form in the sides of most of the cars.

From December 1987 until July 2001, "World's Fair" cars 9478–9523 usually ran on the 6 train based at Westchester Yard in the Bronx. Previously, some Westinghouse-equipped cars had been assigned to the 1 and 3 trains in the late 1960s–early 1980s. The "Main Line" cars usually ran on the 7 from February 1984 to December 1987, and was transferred to the 6 from December 1987 to June 2001, when they were returned to the 7.

=== Retirement ===
In April 1997, the MTA awarded contracts to Bombardier and Kawasaki for the delivery and purchase of new subway cars (the R142 and R142A) in order to retire the R36s, as well as the other A Division Redbird trains. In June 2001, Delaware agreed to acquire 400 cars being retired amongst the A Division Redbird fleet, including the R36s, to create artificial reefs 16 miles off the coast of the state. The fleet began being withdrawn from service in July, with the first cars being reefed in August. The last two cars of the "Main Line" active roster (numbered 9542–9543) made their last trip on the 7 on May 16, 2003. The last ten cars of the "World's Fair" active roster (numbered 9564–9565, 9582–9583, 9584–9585, 9586–9587, and 9616–9617) made their last trip on the 7 on November 3, 2003, along with the R33S fleet as part of a farewell ceremony to commemorate the end of the Redbird fleet in revenue service. A press conference was held at Mets–Willets Point (then known as Willets Point–Shea Stadium) by MTA Chairman Peter Kalikow and New York City Transit President Lawrence Reuter to discuss the end of the Redbird fleet in the subway system.

Several R36 cars were saved for various purposes throughout the New York City Subway system. The full list includes:

- "Main Line" pair 9542–9543 – preserved by the New York Transit Museum in Brooklyn since 2004. This pair was restored to operational status and made its first run on the Train of Many Colors in November 2023. (Note: See also: Dj Hammers (November 1, 2023), Vintage Restored 1960s R36ML "Redbird" Subway Cars 9542-9543 on a Test Run!)
- "World's Fair" pair 9586–9587 – also preserved by the New York Transit Museum in Brooklyn. These cars were stored for many years until being moved to the Concourse Yard in summer 2013. In September 2013, the pair was moved to 207th Street Yard and restored to operating status. The cars were initially displayed at the transit museum and finally participated on their first fan trip on June 8, 2014, on the 7 route, as part of the Train of Many Colors.

"World's Fair" pairs 9582–9583 and 9584–9585 also remain on MTA property. They were transferred to the Unionport Yard along with pair 9586–9587. Pair 9582–9583 was found to have structural issues and was sidelined, while pair 9584–9585 was used on the rail adhesion train until 2019. Plans are unknown for these cars.

In addition to these cars, other cars were also stored around the system. "World's Fair" pair 9400–9401 was stored at the Corona Yard for preservation; however, the cars were never used and were scrapped on October 7, 2013. "World's Fair" pair 9564–9565 was set aside and transferred to Coney Island Yard in December 2004; car 9564 was planned to be repurposed into a visitor center at Queens Borough Hall in Kew Gardens, Queens, and the car 9565 was planned to be preserved in a museum in West Babylon, New York. However, R33 9075 was used at Queens Borough Hall instead of 9564, and 9565 never made it to the proposed museum; the cars were subsequently reefed in 2008. "World's Fair" pair 9588–9589 was stored at the Concourse Yard until 2008, when the pair was reefed.

== In culture ==
Eight WH-powered "World's Fair" cars (9356–57, 9360–61, 9394–95, 9412–13) and two GE-powered cars (9712–13), in addition to one R33S (9327), were wrapped and painted in New York Mets colors on October 24, 2000, prior to Game 3 of the 2000 World Series between the Yankees and Mets.

In addition, the "World's Fair" cars have made cameo roles in various TV shows and movies. Nicolas Cage rides a 7 train of "World's Fair" R36s in It Could Happen to You (1994). In the 1988 movie Cocktail, Tom Cruise gets off car 9700 at Vernon Boulevard–Jackson Avenue station.
