= R33S (New York City Subway car) =

Retired class of New York City Subway car

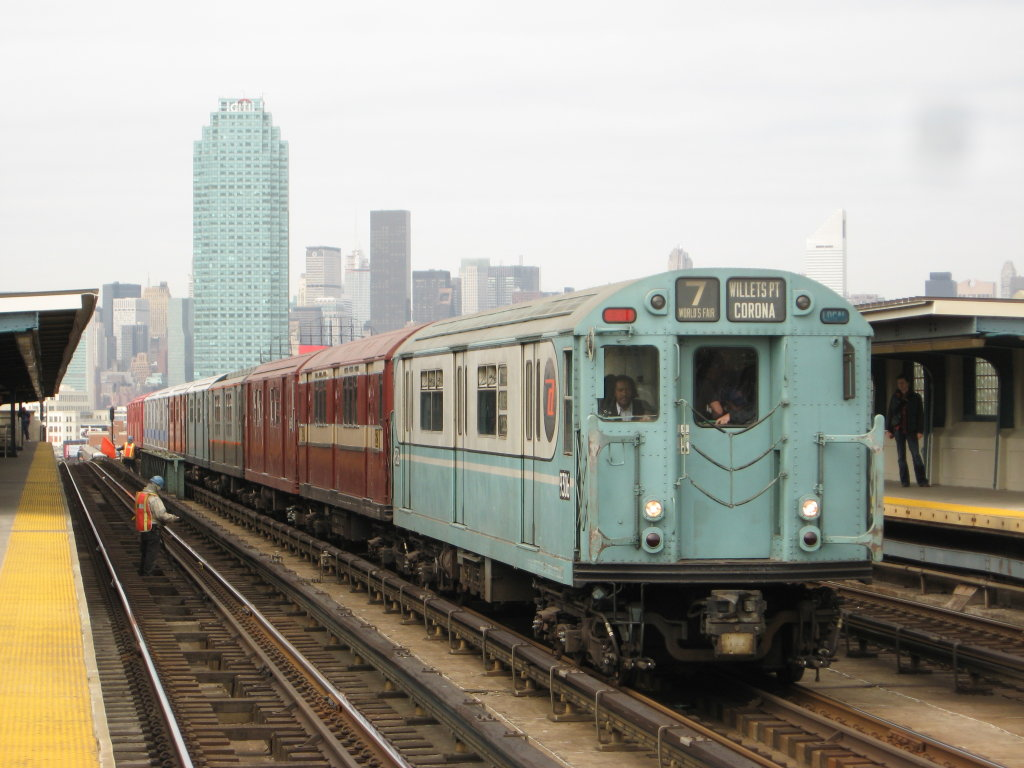
- R33S car 9306, in its original colors, leads the Train of Many Colors through 40 Street–Lowery St on a <7> express run to Mets–Willets Point
- In service: September 26, 1963 – November 3, 2003 (40 years)
- Manufacturer: St. Louis Car Company
- Built at: St. Louis, Missouri, United States
- Constructed: 1963
- Entered service: 1963
- Refurbished: 1985
- Scrapped: 2001 (9321); 2010 (9339); 2013 (several cars)
- Number built: 40
- Number in service: (21 in work service)
- Number preserved: 6
- Number scrapped: 12
- Successor: R142 and R142A
- Formation: Single unit cars
- Fleet numbers: 9306–9345
- Capacity: 44 (seated)
- Operator: New York City Subway

Specifications
- Car body construction: LAHT (Low Alloy High Tensile) steel
- Car length: 51.04 feet (15.56 m)
- Width: 8.75 feet (2,667 mm)
- Height: 11.86 feet (3,615 mm)
- Doors: 6 sets of 50 inch wide side doors per car
- Weight: 75,122 lb (34,075 kg) (pre-rebuild)
- Traction system: Westinghouse XCA248E with Westinghouse (WH) 1447C
- Auxiliaries: Motor-generator and battery set (WH YX304E)
- Electric system: 600 V DC Third rail
- Current collection: Contact shoe
- Braking systems: WABCO, "SMEE" (electrodynamic)
- Track gauge: 4 ft 8 1/2 in (1,435 mm) standard gauge

The R33S (also known as R33 World's Fair or R33WF) was a New York City Subway car that was built by St. Louis Car Company in 1963 for the IRT A Division. They were purchased for service on the IRT Flushing Line (7 and <7> trains), which was the closest line to the 1964 New York World's Fair. A total of 40 cars were built, arranged as single cars. While in regular service, each R33S was coupled to five two-car consists of R36 cars to make 11-car trains for the 7 and <7> routes.

The R33S fleet entered service on September 26, 1963, and was originally painted in a light blue turquoise "Bluebird" scheme. The fleet was overhauled in the mid-1980s, during which the cars were painted red, leading to the nickname "Redbirds". The R33S fleet was replaced in the early 2000s with the delivery of the R142 and R142A cars, with the last train of R33S and R36s running on November 3, 2003. After being retired, some R33S cars were preserved, but most were kept for work service; many of the work cars were scrapped in the 2010s.

== Description ==
The R33S cars were numbered 9306–9345. The cars were very similar to the R33 cars, save for differently shaped side windows (three-piece curved windows on the R33S cars as opposed to three-sectioned rectangular windows on the R33 cars), and the fact that the R33S cars were single cars with a cab at both ends. The cars were built as single cars to make 11-car trains with the R36 cars for the 7, which were built as married pairs.

Although the R33S cars were later referred to as Redbirds, the cars were originally painted in a light turquoise blue and white upon delivery. This "Bluebird" paint color scheme was used until the mid-1970s when they were painted in the silver/blue MTA livery. Then, they were painted a full white (roof, bonnets, sides were all painted white) from 1981 to 1982 to combat graffiti; since the white paint was a Teflon-based paint, the graffiti did not stick to it very well. The look was abandoned for the famous Redbird style. The Redbirds were painted between 1984 and 1989 to a deep maroon red body, black front bonnets and anti-climbers, and a silver roof.

== History ==
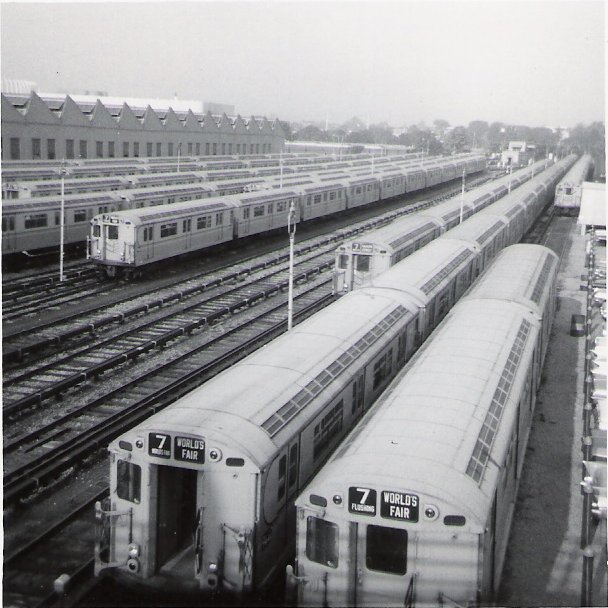
R33S and R36 cars at Corona Yard in 1964

The first R33S cars were placed in service on the 7 train on September 26, 1963. The cars were solely assigned to the 7 (IRT Flushing Line) and were based out of Corona Yard.

The cars were rebuilt in-house in 1985 by the Coney Island Shop, except for one car (9306), which was not rebuilt and instead sent to the New York Transit Museum in 1976. However, they were not retrofitted with air conditioning system and instead retained their original Axiflow ceiling fans. For this reason, they were not used during the summer months due to poor air circulation or air flow and high humidity; the 7 train used 10 car trains when the cars were not used.

=== Retirement and after-life service ===
Car 9307, painted in a replica World's Fair scheme, on an excursion trip at East 180th Street station in April 2026

In April 1997, the MTA awarded contracts to Bombardier and Kawasaki for the delivery and purchase of new subway cars (the R142 and R142A) in order to retire the R33Ss, as well as the other A Division Redbird trains. In June 2001, Delaware agreed to acquire 400 cars being retired amongst the A Division Redbird fleet, including the R33Ss, to create artificial reefs 16 miles off the coast of the state. The fleet began being withdrawn from service in July, with the first cars being reefed in August. The last car on the active roster (numbered 9309) made its last trip on the 7 on November 3, 2003, along with the World's Fair R36 fleet as part of a farewell ceremony to commemorate the end of the Redbird fleet in revenue service. A press conference was held at Mets–Willets Point (then known as Willets Point–Shea Stadium) by MTA Chairman Peter Kalikow and New York City Transit President Lawrence Reuter to discuss the end of the Redbird fleet in the subway system.

Most R33S cars were converted to work motors in the early 2000s, and handle such tasks as providing traction for B-Division rail adhesion cars and refuse trains. The number "1" was placed before the former number (i.e. car 9345 became 19345) of some cars. The work cars are based out of various yards around the system and handle such tasks as providing traction for A-Division rail adhesion cars and refuse trains, and hauling cars during car moves between different subway yards. The cars that were not converted were 9306 and 9327, which were preserved as heritage cars after their retirement from revenue service, and 9321, which was stripped and sunken as an artificial reef in 2001.

Recently, the remaining R33S cars have been decommissioned as they experience structural or mechanical issues. Car 9339 was retired, stripped, and then sunken as an artificial reef in 2010 after it suffered fire damage that year. A handful of cars were replaced by reassigned R32 cars, stripped of parts to keep other IRT SMEE cars running, and then scrapped in 2013. Four cars were sidelined in 2017, after which they were sent into preservation. Currently, another handful of cars are being replaced by reassigned R42 cars.

Six cars have been preserved:

- Cars 9306, 9307, 9308, 9310, and 9343 have been preserved by the New York Transit Museum in Brooklyn. 9306, part of the museum since July 1976, is the only R33S car to not be rebuilt, and thus bears the World's Fair paint scheme and original interior configuration. 9307, 9308, 9310, and 9343 were previously used as work motors based out of Corona Yard, before being retired in 2017. Cars 9307 and 9308 are also painted in the World's Fair scheme, and car 9310 is painted in the "Redbird" scheme; it is unknown what scheme 9343 will be repainted to. All cars except 9343 are fully operational and run periodically on museum-sponsored "Nostalgia Trains", specifically on the Train of Many Colors.
- Car 9327 is preserved at the Seashore Trolley Museum in Kennebunkport, Maine, painted in the Subway Series livery. The car was temporarily displayed at the New York Transit Museum and was used on a fan trip in May 2005 before being sent to Kennebunkport. It is fully operational, though modified with trolley poles, and makes occasional runs around the museum, often coupled to R22 car 7371.
