= Glamour Awards =

Annual American awards honoring women

- A Glamour award
- Awarded for: Honour extraordinary and inspirational women
- Country: United Kingdom
- Presented by: Glamour
- Final award: 8 October 2024
- Website: glamourmagazine.co.uk

The Glamour Awards is an annual set of awards hosted by Glamour magazine. Woman of the Year awards honour "extraordinary and inspirational" women from a variety of fields, including entertainment, business, sports, music, science, medicine, education and politics. There is also an award handed out each year called the Man of the Year for men.

== Winners ==
=== 1999 ===
- Woman of the Year – Jennifer Lopez

=== 2000s ===
==== 2001 ====
- Woman of the Year
- Salma Hayek
- Susan Stroman
- Moira Smith

==== 2002 ====
- Oral Lee Brown

==== 2003 ====
References:

- Woman of the Year – Britney Spears
- Lifetime Achievement – Queen Noor

==== 2004 ====
References:

- Woman of the Year – Christina Aguilera
- Man of the Year – David Schwimmer
- Entrepreneur – Sharon Osbourne
- Newcomer – Joss Stone
- UK TV Actress – Joely Richardson
- US TV Actress – Kim Cattrall
- Solo Artist – Kelis
- Band – Girls Aloud
- TV Personality – Cat Deeley
- Radio Personality – Jo Whiley
- Film Actress – Keira Knightley
- Theatre Actress – Denise van Outen
- Model – Elizabeth Jagger
- Writer – Helen Fielding
- Film-maker – Gurinder Chadha
- Fashion Designer – Stella McCartney
- Accessory Designer – Tamara Mellon
- Funny Woman – Ronni Ancona
- Sports Woman – Serena Williams

==== 2005 ====
References:

- Woman of the Year – Rachel Stevens
- Man of the Year – Usher
- Editor's Special – Teri Hatcher
- Entrepreneur – Elle Macpherson
- Newcomer – Mischa Barton
- UK TV Actress – Patsy Kensit
- US TV Actress – Teri Hatcher
- UK Solo Artist – Natasha Bedingfield
- International Solo Artist – Gwen Stefani
- Band – Destiny's Child
- TV Personality – Cat Deeley
- Radio Personality – Jo Whiley
- Film Actress – Sophie Okonedo
- Theatre Actress – Kim Cattrall
- Writer – J. K. Rowling
- Film-maker – Beeban Kidron
- Fashion Designer – Alice Temperley
- Accessory Designer – Tamara Mellon
- Sports Woman – Kelly Holmes

==== 2006 ====
References:

- Woman of the Year – Somaly Mam
- Man of the Year – Paul Bettany
- Editor's Special – Charlotte Church
- Outstanding Contribution Award – Naomi Campbell
- Entrepreneur – Elizabeth Hurley
- Nokia's Newcomer – Natalie Press
- UK TV Actress – Billie Piper
- US TV Actress – Nicollette Sheridan
- UK Solo Artist – Charlotte Church
- International Solo Artist – Pink
- Band – Sugababes
- TV Personality – Sharon Osbourne
- Radio Personality – Edith Bowman
- TV Presenter – Davina McCall
- Film Actress – Naomi Watts
- Theatre Actress – Sienna Miller
- Film-maker – Emma Thompson
- Fashion Designer – Luella Bartley
- Accessory Designer – Anya Hindmarch
- Funny Woman – Ashley Jensen

==== 2007 ====
References:

- Woman of the Year – Victoria Beckham
- Man of the Year – Eric Mabius
- Inspiration Award – Angelina Jolie
- Outstanding Contribution – Helen Mirren
- Entrepreneur – Victoria Beckham
- Nokia Newcomer – Freema Agyeman
- UK Solo Artist – Amy Winehouse
- International Solo Artist – Beyoncé
- Band – Girls Aloud
- TV Personality – Charlotte Church
- Radio Personality – Sara Cox
- Presenter – Fearne Cotton
- Film Actress – Sienna Miller
- Theatre Actress – Ashlee Simpson
- Writer – Teri Hatcher
- Film-makers – Tracey Seaward & Christine Langan
- Fashion Designer – Luella Bartley
- Accessory Designer – Anya Hindmarch
- Funny Woman – Catherine Tate
- Sportswoman – Zara Phillips

==== 2008 ====
References:

- Man of the Year – Mark Ronson
- Editor's Special – Lily Allen
- Inspiration – Annie Lennox
- Entrepreneur – Kate Moss
- Aussie Hair Care Newcomer – Hayden Panettiere
- UK TV Actress – Keeley Hawes
- UK Solo Artist – Leona Lewis
- International Musician – Beth Ditto
- Band – Spice Girls
- TV Personality – Dannii Minogue
- Radio Personality – Jo Whiley
- Presenter – Fearne Cotton
- Film Actress – Kate Beckinsale
- Theatre Actress – Kelly Osbourne
- Writer – Cecelia Ahern
- Film-maker – Jane Goldman
- Accessories Designer – Tamara Mellon
- Comedy Actress – Joanna Page

==== 2009 ====
References:

- Woman of the Year – Kylie Minogue
- Man of the Year – Kanye West
- Editor's Special – Estelle
- Newcomer – Katy Perry
- UK TV Actress – Michelle Ryan
- UK Solo Artist – Adele
- Band – Girls Aloud
- TV Personality – Cheryl Cole
- Radio Personality – Fearne Cotton
- Presenter – Alexa Chung
- Film Actress – Amanda Seyfried
- Theatre Actress – Joanna Page
- Writer – Sophie Kinsella
- Film-maker – Sharman Macdonald
- Fashion Designer – Frida Giannini
- Accessory Designer – Samantha Cameron
- Comedy Actress – Becki Newton

=== 2010s ===
==== 2010 ====
References:

- Woman of the Year – Cheryl Cole
- Man of the Year – Aaron Taylor-Johnson
- Editors Special – Anna Kendrick
- Outstanding Contribution – Yoko Ono
- Entrepreneur – Nicole Richie
- Sheer Infusion Newcomer – Alexandra Burke
- UK TV Actress – Billie Piper
- US TV Actress – Lea Michele
- Solo Artist – Lily Allen
- Band – Florence & The Machine
- TV Personality – Dannii Minogue
- Radio Personality – Fearne Cotton
- Presenter – Christine Bleakley
- Film Actress – Zoe Saldaña
- Writer – Sarah Waters
- Filmmaker – Sam Taylor-Wood
- Fashion Designer – Isabel Marant
- Accessory Designer – Emma Hill
- Comedy Actress – Ruth Jones
- Sportswoman – Amy Williams

==== 2011 ====
References:

- Woman of the Year - Jennifer Lopez
- Man of the Year – Garrett Hedlund
- Editor's Special – Rosie Huntington-Whiteley
- Outstanding Contribution – Stevie Nicks
- Entrepreneur – Kim Kardashian
- TV Actress – Lenora Crichlow
- UK Solo Artist – Marina
- Band – The Saturdays
- TV Personality – Dannii Minogue
- Radio Personality – Fearne Cotton
- Presenter – Davina McCall
- Film Actress – Gemma Arterton
- Theatre Actress – Naomie Harris
- Writer – Dawn French
- Filmmaker – Jane Goldman
- Designer – Sarah Burton
- Accessory Designer – Victoria Beckham
- Comedy Actress – Miranda Hart
- Sportswoman – Jessica Ennis
- Pandora Breakthrough Artist – Ellie Goulding
- Woman of Tomorrow – Jessie J
- Best Dressed – Frankie Sandford

==== 2012 ====
References:

- Man of the Year – Tom Hiddleston
- Woman of the Year – Selena Gomez
- Editor's Special – Michelle Dockery
- Inspiration – Eva Longoria
- Outstanding Contribution – Kylie Minogue
- Entrepreneur – Jessica Alba
- UK TV Actress – Jessica Brown Findlay
- US TV Actress – Lea Michele
- UK Solo Artist – Jessie J
- Band – Florence & the Machine
- TV Personality – Kelly Rowland
- Radio Personality – Fearne Cotton
- Presenter – Holly Willoughby
- Film Actress – Viola Davis
- Theatre Actress – Amanda Holden
- Writer – Caitlin Moran
- Fashion Designer – Donatella Versace
- Accessories Designer – Charlotte Olympia
- Comedy Actress – Sofía Vergara
- Sportswoman – Hayley Turner
- Pandora Breakthrough Artist – Lily Collins
- Icon – Dionne Warwick
- inspirational soccer player – Carli Lloyd

==== 2013 ====
References:

- Woman of the Year – Lady Gaga
- Man of the Year – Daniel Radcliffe
- Editor's Special Award – Jessie J
- Entrepreneur – Myleene Klass
- UK TV Actress – Joanne Froggatt
- International TV Actress – Zosia Mamet
- Solo Artist – Rita Ora
- Band – The Saturdays
- TV Personality – Nicole Scherzinger
- Radio Personality – Jameela Jamil
- Presenter – Clare Balding
- Film Actress – Rebel Wilson
- Theatre Actress – Helen McCrory
- Writer – Miranda Hart
- Fashion Designer – Clare Waight Keller
- Accessories Designer – Emma Hill
- Film Maker – Rashida Jones
- Sportswoman – Nicola Adams
- Pandora Breakthrough – Samantha Barks
- Woman of the Decade – Victoria Beckham
- Lifetime Achievement – Barbra Streisand

==== 2014 ====
References:

- Women of the Year – Laverne Cox, Robin Roberts, Mindy Kaling, Samantha Power, Sarah Burton, Natalia Vodianova, Lupita Nyong'o, Sylvia Earle, Chelsea Clinton
- Man of the Year – Sam Claflin
- Editor's Special Award – Taylor Schilling
- Outstanding Contribution – Nicole Kidman
- Entrepreneur Award – Alexa Chung
- Band – Little Mix
- International Solo Artist – Taylor Swift
- UK Solo Artist – Paloma Faith
- Film Actress – Sally Hawkins
- UK TV Actress – Jenna Coleman
- International TV Actress – Emily VanCamp
- Theatre Actress – Billie Piper
- Comedy Actress – Sarah Hyland
- TV Personality – Naomi Campbell
- Radio Personality – Fearne Cotton
- Presenter Award – Emma Willis
- Film Maker – Lake Bell
- Writer – Helen Fielding
- Columnist – Jane Moore
- Fashion Designer – Simone Rocha
- Accessories Designer – Katie Hillier
- NEXT Breakthrough – Lily James
- Sportswoman – Christine Ohuruogu
- Hero – Davina McCall
- Icon – Helen Mirren

==== 2015 ====
25th Anniversary.

- Man of the Year – Calvin Harris
- NEXT Breakthrough – Suki Waterhouse
- Comedy Actress – Kaley Cuoco
- Theatre Actress – Gillian Anderson
- International TV Actress – Kerry Washington
- Presenter Award – Claudia Winkleman & Tess Daly
- Editor's Special Award – Ellie Kemper
- Trailblazer – Amy Schumer
- Sportsman – Laura Trott
- UK TV Actress – Olivia Colman
- Entrepreneur – Kate Hudson
- Entrepreneur – Elizabeth Holmes
- Writer – Paula Hawkins
- Fashion Designer – Mary Katrantzou
- Radio Personality – Fearne Cotton
- Film Actress – Felicity Jones
- TV Personality – Rita Ora
- Accessories Designer – Anya Hindmarch
- Cointreau British Solo Artist – Ellie Goulding
- Inspiration – Jourdan Dunn
- Columnist – Caitlin Moran
- Film Maker – Ava DuVernay
- Fashion Force – Victoria Beckham
- Showstopper – Misty Copeland
- Transgender Champion – Caitlyn Jenner
- Health Advocate – Cecile Richards
- Game Changers – Team USA
- Peacemakers – Charleston Strong

==== 2017 ====
References:

- Comedy Actress – Sharon Horgan
- UK TV Actress – Vanessa Kirby
- Accessories Designer – Tabitha Simmons
- Columnist – Caitlin Moran
- Trailblazer – Jennifer Hudson
- YouTubers – Pixiwoo
- Filmmaker – Sharon Maguire
- W Channel Sportswoman – Nicola Adams
- TV Personality – Emma Willis
- Music Act – Little Mix
- Next Breakthrough – Dua Lipa
- Shiseido Group Theatre Actress – Billie Piper
- Entrepreneur – Jourdan Dunn
- Writer – Anna Kendrick
- Editor's Award – Winnie Harlow
- Icons – Bananarama
- Man of the Year – James Corden
- Film Actress – Nicole Kidman
- Glamour Inspiration – Amy Poehler

==== 2018 ====
References:

- Voices of Courage - The women who took down Larry Nassar, including Aly Raisman and Rachael Denhollander; as well as Detective Andrea Munford, Assistant Attorney General Angela Povilaitis, and Judge Rosemarie Aquilina
- Icon - Viola Davis
- Advocate - Kamala Harris
- Influencer - Chrissy Teigen
- Next-Gen Leaders - The women activists of March for Our Lives
- Lifetime Achievement - Betty Reid Soskin
- Visionary - Janelle Monáe
- Freedom Fighter - Manal al-Sharif

==== 2019 ====
- Greta Thunberg

==== 2021 ====
References

- Megan Thee Stallion; Katalin Karikó; Amanda Gorman; Mariska Hargitay; activists Helen Butler, Nsé Ufot and LaTosha Brown; and co-founders of charity Heart of Dinner, Yin Chang and Moonlynn Tsai.

==== 2023 ====
References:

- Women of the Year - Geena Rocero, Mary J. Blige, Brooke Shields, Quinta Brunson, America Ferrera and Millie Bobby Brown
- Daring to Disrupt - Selma Blair

==== 2024 ====
- Women of the Year – Serena Williams, Pamela Anderson, Suni Lee, Sydney Sweeney, Taraji P. Henson, Allyson Felix, Hadley Duvall and Kaitlyn Joshua.
- Music Icon - Kesha
- Rising Star – Say Now

==== 2025 ====
References:

- Global Women of the Year – Demi Moore and Tyla
- US & UK Woman of the Year – Rachel Zegler
- Women of the Year – Ms. Rachel, Pat McGrath and five Women's National Basketball Association players: Lexie Hull, Napheesa Collier, Jonquel Jones, Nyara Sabally and Satou Sabally

== Criticism ==
After Glamour announced that it would be giving an award to Caitlyn Jenner in November 2015, the husband of New York police officer Moira Smith returned the "Woman of the Year" award that Glamour had awarded her, with an open letter to Cyndi Lieve. the magazine's editor-in-chief. Jenner decided to return the award, in 2024.

== See also ==
- List of awards honoring women
- Glamour
