= History of the New York City Subway =

The history of the New York City Subway, a transportation system in the United States, is discussed in the following articles:

- History of the New York City Subway (to 1940)
- History of the New York City Subway (1940–present)
- List of accidents and incidents on the New York City Subway
