= List of accidents and incidents on the New York City Subway =

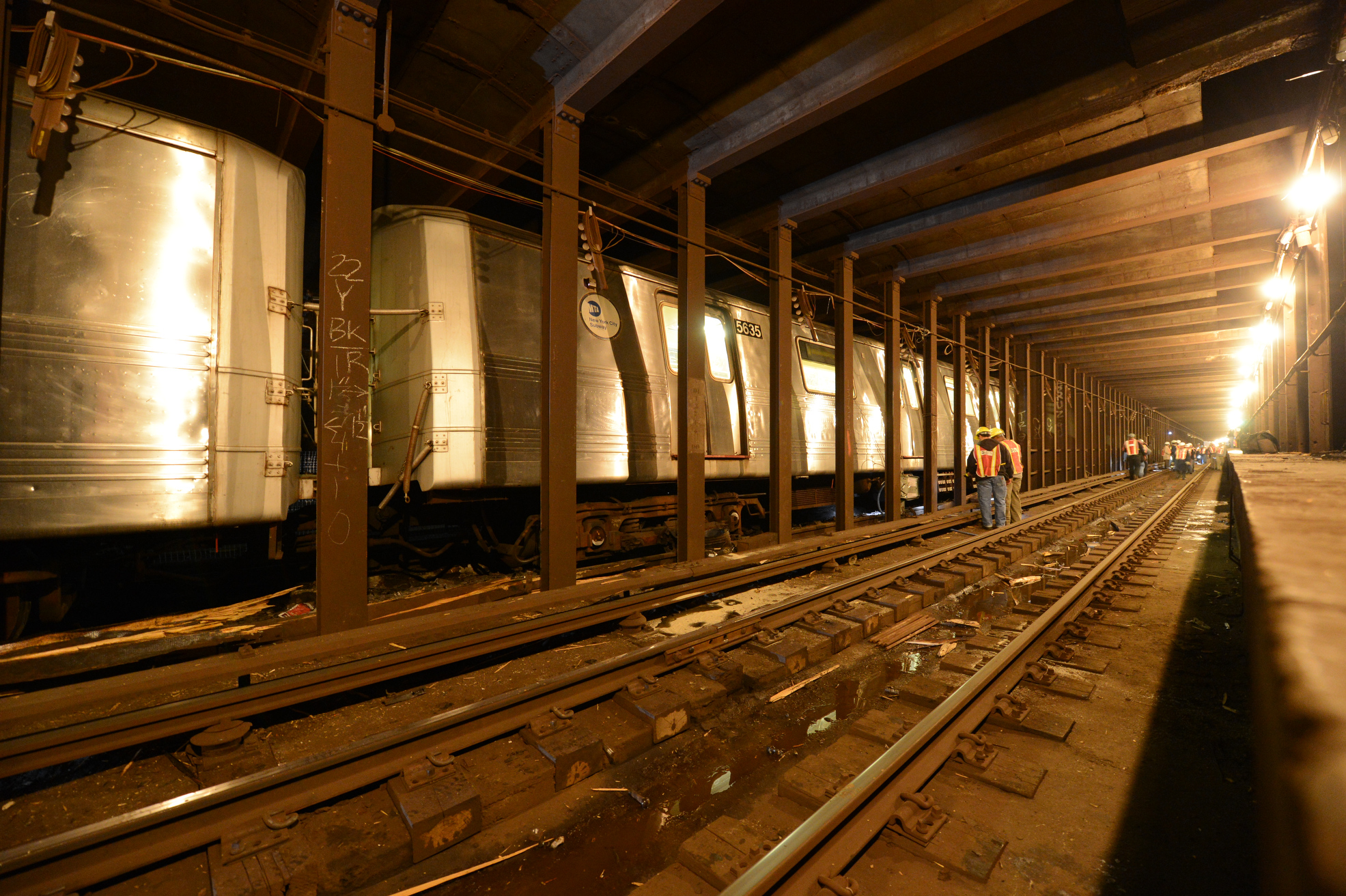
Aftermath of F train derailment in May 2014

Many train accidents have been recorded on the New York City Subway in the US since 1918, when a train bound for South Ferry smashed into two trains halted near Jackson Avenue on the IRT White Plains Road Line in the Bronx.

Only accidents that caused injuries, deaths, or significant damage are listed.

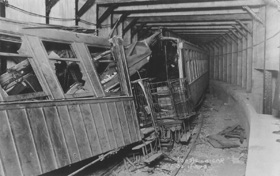
The Malbone Street Wreck killed 97 people.

== Train accidents ==
- October 3, 1918: A collision at Jackson Avenue killed two and injured 18.
- November 1, 1918: The Malbone Street Wreck killed 97 and injured 200.
- August 6, 1927: Two bombs exploded at 28th Street (BMT Broadway Line) and 28th Street (IRT Lexington Avenue Line).
- August 24, 1928: A derailment in Times Square on a southbound express train on the IRT Broadway–Seventh Avenue Line killed 16 and injured 100.
- August 22, 1938: A collision at the 116th Street station (IRT Lexington Avenue Line) killed 2 and injured 51.
- September 26, 1957: A motorman and three passengers were killed at an accident at 231st Street.
- November 28, 1962: A crane fell in Coney Island, killing three.
- May 4, 1965: A crane fell on the IRT New Lots Line, killing one.
- December 29, 1969: A southbound train derailed near East 180th Street in the Bronx, injuring 48.
- February 27, 1970: A 6 train hit a bumper block at the Pelham Bay Park station, injuring 7.
- May 20, 1970: Two Brooklyn-bound GG trains crashed west of Roosevelt Avenue, killing 2 and injuring 77.
- July 17, 1970: A Manhattan-bound E train ran into an A train at Hoyt–Schermerhorn Streets, injuring 37.
- August 1, 1970: A fire in the tunnel near Bowling Green killed one and injured 50.
- May 27, 1971: A 7 train was stuck in the Steinway Tunnel and one person died of a heart attack.
- July 16, 1971: A fire took place south of 14th Street on the IRT Lexington Avenue Line, injuring 11.
- August 28, 1973: A 7 train was hit by falling concrete in the Steinway Tunnel, killing one and injuring 18.
- October 4, 1973: Three passengers were injured when a Lexington Avenue Express train derailed 900 feet south of the Bergen Street station.
- October 25, 1973: A fire in two train cars at Longwood Avenue led to a rear-end accident.
- December 1, 1974: Six people were injured as a Franklin Avenue Shuttle train consisting of R32s derailed at the same spot of the Malbone Street Wreck hitting the wall leaving a massive gash in the side of one of the cars.
- April 12, 1977: Two passengers were injured when an N train derailed between the Manhattan Bridge and DeKalb Avenue.
- June 30, 1978: Three people were injured when an L train derailed, with nine of the cars leaving the track, damaging the track and platform.
- December 13, 1978: A CC train derailed south of 59th Street Columbus Circle crashing into the tunnel wall, injuring 16 of 100 passengers.
- November 20, 1980: A 2 train derailed as it entered Chambers Street injuring 16 passengers.
- January 12, 1981: A D train derailed on the BMT Brighton Line near Kings Highway injuring 10 passengers.
- July 3, 1981: A motorman was killed and 135 passengers are injured as a Manhattan bound train plowed into the rear of a second train halted for a failed signal between Sutter Avenue and Utica Avenue.
- April 25, 1986: An out of service F train crashed into the bumper blocks at 179th Street, and the motorman died of a heart attack.
- July 26, 1990: A B train and an M train collided on the BMT West End Line, injuring 36 people.
- December 28, 1990: An electrical fire occurred in the Clark Street Tunnel, killing 2 and injuring 188.
- August 28, 1991: In a derailment at Union Square, five people were killed and more than 200 were injured when a southbound 4 train derailed due to a drunk motorman.
- October 7, 1993: Two L trains collided at the Graham Avenue station; 45 were injured.
- August 15, 1994: A southbound B train derailed near Ninth Avenue in Brooklyn, injuring 11.
- December 21, 1994: A bomb made by Edward Leary detonated in a subway car, injuring him and 47 others.
- February 9, 1995: An M train and a B train collided near the Ninth Avenue station. Seven people on the B train were injured, and the motorman of the M train was culpable.
- June 5, 1995: In a collision on the Williamsburg Bridge, a Manhattan-bound J train crashed into a stopped Manhattan-bound M train after passing a red light at high speed, killing one and injuring 50.
- August 23, 1995: A 6 train collided with another at Brooklyn Bridge–City Hall station, injuring 87.
- July 3, 1997: A Queens-bound A train derailed in Harlem, near the 135th Street station, injuring 15 people.
- July 14, 1997: The last car of a southbound 2 train derailed near Franklin Avenue, injuring four people.
- November 20, 1997: A Forest Hills-bound R train rear-ended a G train in a tunnel near the Steinway Street station, injuring 40, none seriously.
- April 12, 2000: A northbound 5 train derailed near 68th Street, injuring nine people.
- June 21, 2000: A southbound B train derailed just after leaving the DeKalb Avenue station in Brooklyn, injuring more than 80 people. Officials said the third car jumped off the track, pulling the second car along.
- May 2, 2014: A Manhattan-bound F train with 1,000 people on board derailed near 65th Street, injuring at least 19 people.
- September 10, 2015: A southbound G train with approximately 80 people on board derailed near Hoyt–Schermerhorn Streets, injuring at least five people.
- June 27, 2017: A southbound A train derailed then caught fire near 125th Street. The derailment, caused by improperly secured replacement rails, resulted in 39 minor injuries.
- March 27, 2020: A northbound 2 train caught fire at the Central Park North–110th Street station, killing the motorman and injuring at least 16 other people. Since several other fires had been observed in nearby stations, the incident was investigated as a possible arson.
- September 20, 2020: A northbound A train derailed at 14th Street/Eighth Avenue station when a homeless man clamped wooden planks onto the roadbed causing the train to derail. Three passengers were injured.
- January 4, 2024: Two trains collided at the 96th Street station. Both trains derailed on impact, and 24 people were injured.
- January 10, 2024: A northbound F train derailed near the West Eighth Street–New York Aquarium station in Coney Island. All 37 passengers were evacuated.

Additionally, in an accident recorded before 1918, a derailment happened on the Ninth Avenue Elevated in Manhattan on September 11, 1905, resulting in 13 deaths and 48 serious injuries.

== Other disasters ==
Other accidents in the history of the subway do not involve trains; several people have been fatally electrocuted by the subway's third rails, and yet others have been fatally pushed onto the tracks. Fatal pushing incidents include the 2022 death of Michelle Go at the Times Square station.

In 1960, a person nicknamed the Sunday Bomber set off a series of bombs in the New York City Subway during Sundays and holidays, killing one woman and injuring 51 other commuters. The bomber also set off bombs in ferries. On April 12, 2022, a mass shooting attack occurred on the N train, injuring at least 29 people.
