= Signaling of the New York City Subway =

External videos
- CBTC: Communications-Based Train Control on YouTube (MTA)
- Modernization of the L metro line in New York City on YouTube (Siemens)

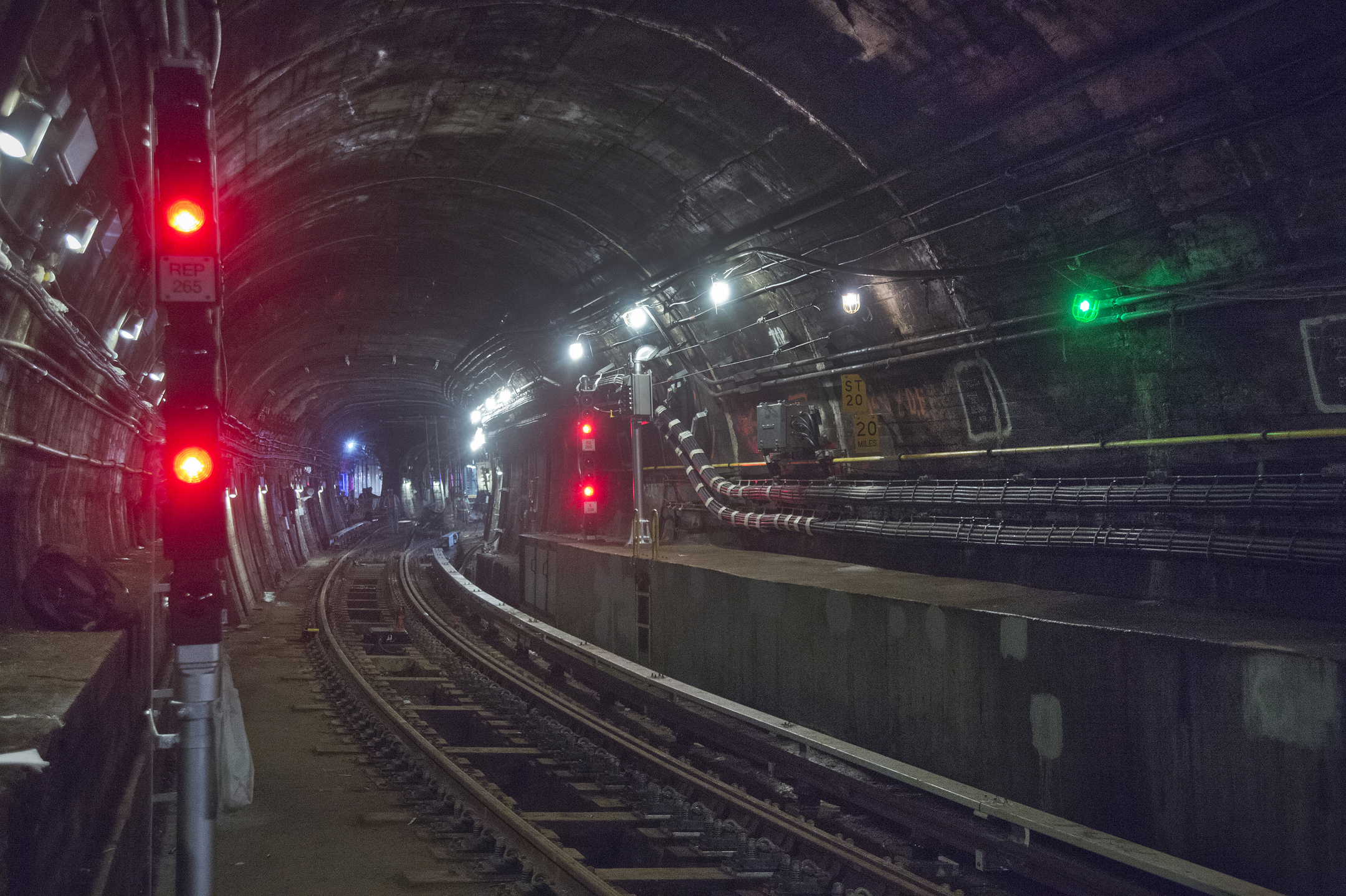
A "repeater" signal in the Montague Street Tunnel, which mirrors the indications of the signal directly around the curve

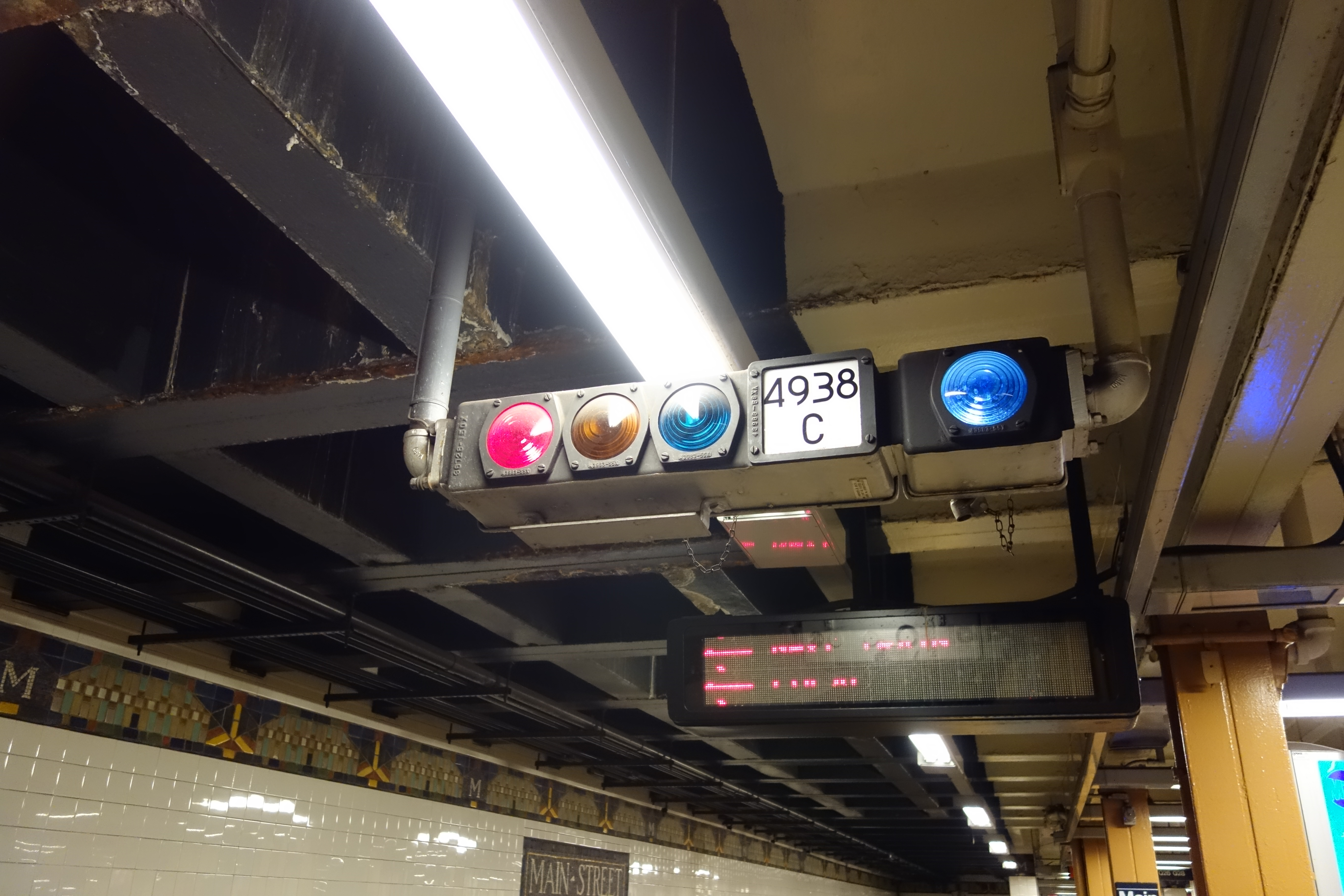
A signal in the Flushing–Main Street station

Most trains on the New York City Subway are manually operated. As of 2022, the system currently uses automatic block signaling, with fixed wayside signals and automatic train stops. Many portions of the signaling system were installed between the 1930s and 1960s. Because of the age of the subway system, many replacement parts are unavailable from signaling suppliers and must be custom-built for the New York City Transit Authority, which operates the subway. Additionally, some subway lines have reached their train capacity limits and cannot operate extra trains in the current system.

There have been two different schemes of signaling in the system. The current scheme is used on all A Division and B Division lines, originally built to the Brooklyn–Manhattan Transit Corporation (BMT) and Independent Subway System (IND)'s specifications. An older system was previously used on all of the A Division, but with the conversion of the IRT Dyre Avenue Line signals to the B Division scheme in September 2017, this system is no longer in use.

As part of the modernization of the New York City Subway, the Metropolitan Transportation Authority (MTA) plans to upgrade and automate much of the system with communications-based train control (CBTC) technology, which will automatically start and stop trains. The CBTC system is mostly automated and uses a moving block system—which reduces headways between trains, increases train frequencies and capacities, and relays the trains' positions to a control room—rather than a fixed block system. The implementation of CBTC requires new rolling stock to be built for the subway routes using the technology, as only newer trains use CBTC.

== Block signaling ==
The New York City Subway system has, for the most part, used block signaling since its 1904 opening. As of May 2014, the system consists of about 14,850 signal blocks, 3,538 mainline switches, 183 major track junctions, 10,104 automatic train stops, and 339,191 signal relays. Fixed-block signals are used on about 85% of the subway system as of 2025. Trains used to be controlled by signal towers at interlockings, but this was eventually phased out in favor of master towers. Eventually, these master towers were replaced by a single rail control center: the New York City Transit Power Control Center in Midtown Manhattan.

These signals work by preventing trains from entering a "block" occupied by another train. Typically, the blocks are 1,000 feet (300 m) long, although some highly used lines, such as the IRT Lexington Avenue Line, use shorter blocks. Insulators divide the track segments into blocks. The two traveling rails form a track circuit, as they conduct electric current. If the track circuit is open and electricity cannot travel between the rails, the signal will light up as green, as it is unoccupied by a train. When a train enters the block, the metal wheels close the circuit on the rails, and the signal turns red, marking the block as occupied. The train's maximum speed will depend on how many blocks are open in front of it. However, the signals do not register the trains' speed, nor do they register where in the block the train is located. If a train passes a red signal, the train stop automatically engages and activates the brakes.

The New York City Subway generally distinguishes its current signals between automatic signals, which are solely controlled by train movements; approach signals, which can be forced to display a stop aspect by the interlocking tower; home signals, whose route is set by the interlocking tower; and additional signals (such as call-on, dwarf, marker, sign, repeater and time signals).

Common automatic and approach signals consist of one signal head showing one of the following signal aspects:

- stop (one red light); with special rules for call-on and timer signals
- clear, next signal at clear or caution (one green light)
- proceed with caution, be prepared to stop at next signal (one yellow light)

Where different directions are possible, the subway uses both speed and route signaling. The upper signal head indicates the speed while the lower signal head is used for routes, with the main route shown in green and the diverging route shown in yellow.

The old signals break down more easily, since some signals have outlasted their 50-year service life by up to 30 years, and signal problems accounted for 13% of all subway delays in 2016. Additionally, some subway services have reached their train capacity limits and cannot operate extra trains with the current Automatic Block Signaling system.

=== Types of block signals ===
==== Standard block signals ====
The following indications are used for blocks where there are no track divergences (i.e. junctions) in the block immediately ahead.

Proceed

Proceed with caution, next signal is currently red

Stop. Passing this signal trips the train stop

Two-shot grade time signal, next signal is red only due to grade timing

Two-shot grade time signal, next signal is a home signal set to diverge and is red only due to grade timing

One-shot grade time signal, timer has not yet run out.

Station timer signal, signal will clear if approached at the displayed speed.

Older signals on the former IRT lines may use different indications, which are not shown. The lights on the older IRT signals, from top to bottom, were green, red, and yellow. The lights on current signals, from top to bottom, are green, yellow, and red.

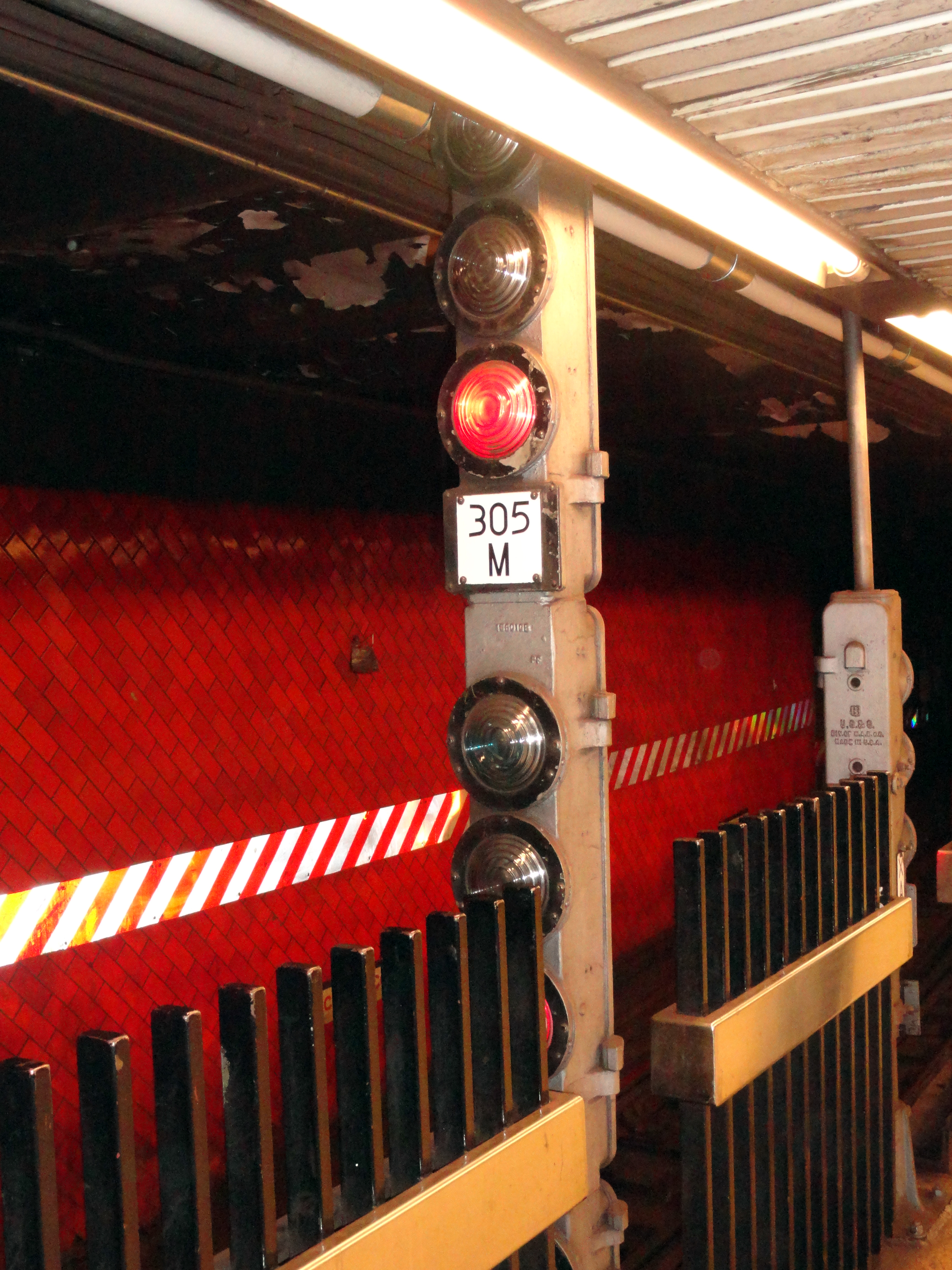
A modern, un-renovated subway signal at Bowling Green station.

==== Key-by signals ====
The system also has automatic and manual "key-by" red signals where the conductor can insert a physical key into the wayside block signal, changing the signal indication from red to yellow. The signals involve the operation of an automatic stop with an automatic or manual release, then to proceed with caution, with preparations to stop in case of debris or other obstructions on the track.

Until 1970, when a train paused at a red block signal the train operator was allowed to pass the red signal by keying-by. That is, the train operator pauses at the red signal and then gets out of the cab, descends to the tracks' level, and cranks down the track trip with a key-like device. After a series of accidents in which train operators keyed by and crashed into trains in front, including a crash north of the Hoyt–Schermerhorn Streets station in 1970, the procedure was banned unless permission was granted by the train dispatchers.

==== Time signals ====
Speed control on the subway is ensured by "time signals". A timer, counting up, is started as soon as the train passes a certain point and will clear the signal ahead as soon as the predefined time elapsed. The minimum time is calculated from the speed limit and the distance between start of timer and signal. "Time signals" are distinguished into "grade timers" for speed supervision at grades, curves or in front of buffer stops, and "station timers" to allow one train to enter a station just as another is leaving, as long as these trains are going at a reduced speed. There are two types of grade-time signals. The first type, "two-shot timers", are generally used on down grades where the train must be under a set speed for a longer length of track. They are so named because a train operator would have two chances, or "shots", to pass the signal within the posted speed limit. "One-shot timers", on the other hand, are found at sharp curves, and are named because the operator only has one chance to pass the signal within the speed limit.

==== Repeater signals ====
"Repeater signals" are also used to maintain safe train operation around curves. These signals repeat the indication of a signal up ahead around a curve, and are located on the opposite side of the track from the signals they repeat.

==== Wheel detectors ====
Another addition to the system's transit signals are "Wheel Detectors". These are sensors that can determine how fast a train is moving based on how quickly the axles of a given car are moving. First introduced in 1996 at interlockings, they further enforce the speed at which a train is traveling through an interlocking, and they are only active when a switch is set to the divergent route. Wheel detectors prevent train operators from running slowly at the beginning of a grade timing segment and then increasing the speed beyond the allowable limit without being tripped. When the indication is flashing, the train is too fast and is about to be tripped.

==== Gap filler signals ====
"Gap filler signals" are used at the 14th Street–Union Square station on the IRT Lexington Avenue Line. They were formerly used at the Brooklyn Bridge–City Hall station on the IRT Lexington Avenue Line, the South Ferry Loop station on the IRT Broadway–Seventh Avenue Line, and the Times Square–42nd Street station on the 42nd Street Shuttle. These stations are part of the A Division, which consists of lines built by the Interborough Rapid Transit Company (IRT). At these stops, gap fillers extend out from the platforms to bridge the space between the platform and the car body and door at the curved stations. The signal consists of a single red lamp and a "GF" indicator underneath. When the signal is red, the gap fillers are extended, and when the red light is no longer lit up, the gap fillers have been retracted, and the train operator can increase the speed of the train and leave the station.

=== Types of interlocking signals ===
Interlockings consist of two or more tracks that are connected by railroad switches; routes typically may conflict at these locations. They are arranged in a specific way, with switches and signals that prevent conflicting movements once one route is set up. Interlocking signals are fixed signals within an interlocking, containing two separate green-yellow-red signal heads and often other indications. A home signal is defined as an interlocking signal at the entrance to a route or block to control trains entering that route or block. Most interlockings only have one controlled signal on each track. Some home signals contain a third, yellow aspect, on the bottom, and are known as "call-on" signals. These signals allow the train operator to press a lever near the signal to lower the trip arm, allowing the train to pass the signal at slow speed even if the signal is displaying a red light. Similar signals can be found in yards. The three aspects on these signals, when all displaying yellow, allow the train operator to go past the signal at a slow speed without stopping the train.

Interlocking signals are controlled by human operators in a signal tower near the switches, not by the trains themselves. A train operator must use a punch box, which is located besides the cab window in the station closest to the interlocking, to notify the switch operator of which track the train needs to go to. The switch operator has a switchboard in their tower that allows them to change the switches.

Interlocking signals also tell train operators which way switches on the subway are set. The top part of an interlocking signal indicates the condition of the block ahead, while the lower part indicates the route selected. The following interlocking signals are used on the New York City Subway:

Proceed, switch set to straight

Proceed with caution, switch set to straight, next signal is currently red

Proceed, switch set to diverge

Proceed with caution, switch set to diverge, next signal is currently red

Stop and stay

Call on (train has been given permission to pass red signal)

Two-shot grade time signal, switch set to straight, next signal is red only due to grade timing

Two-shot grade time signal, switch set to diverge, next signal is red only due to grade timing

Two-shot grade time signal, switch set to straight, next signal is a home signal set to diverge and red only due to grade timing

Two-shot grade time signal, switch set to diverge, next signal is a home signal set to diverge and red only due to grade timing

One-shot grade time signal, timer has not yet run out

Station timer signal, signal will clear if approached at the displayed speed.

==== Variants ====
Until the DeKalb Avenue junction's reconstruction in 1958, there was a three-way switch at that junction, the only one in the system. A special blue signal was used for the third option.

Another signal type is a "dwarf signal", which is often used at switches to allow for occasional movements against the usual direction of train traffic. Controlled manually from a tower, they are not part of ordinary operations, and they generally do not include trip arms.

=== Modifications to signals ===
On June 8, 1927, the New York State Transit Commission (NYSTC) ordered the Brooklyn–Manhattan Transit Corporation (BMT) to install automatic signals and automatic tripping devices on the remaining 142 miles (229 km) of unsignalled local tracks. The NYSTC ordered the Interborough Rapid Transit Company to install automatic signals and automatic tripping devices on all 183 miles (295 km) of unsignalled local tracks on June 29, 1927. The work was to estimated to cost $9,345,800 on the BMT, and $13,328,400 on the IRT. On March 16, 1931, the installation of signaling on the local tracks of the BMT Jamaica Line from 168th Street to Broadway Junction was complete. Work to install signaling on the IRT White Plains Road Line from Wakefield–241st Street to Gun Hill Road was completed on June 7, 1931, while the work on the elevated portion of the IRT Pelham Line was completed on August 5, 1931. The signal installation on the BMT Myrtle Avenue Line from Broadway to Metropolitan Avenue was completed on October 4, 1931. The signaling of the BMT Brighton Line was completed on December 16, 1931.

After a collision between two trains on the Williamsburg Bridge in 1995, in which a train operator was killed after speeding his train into the back of another, the MTA modified both signals and trains to lower their average speeds. Trains' maximum speeds were reduced from 55 miles per hour (89 km/h) to 40 miles per hour (64 km/h), and the MTA installed grade-time signals around the system to ensure that a train could only travel under a certain maximum speed before it was allowed to proceed. Some of these time signals malfunctioned: they prevented trains from passing even if the operator had slowed down the train to the speed that was indicated, and so some operators slowed trains further in case a time signal forced trains to wait for longer than was indicated. This resulted in overcrowded trains, since fewer trains per hour were able to proceed on certain sections of track. By 2012, over 1,200 signals had been modified, and of these, 1.1% (13 signals) caused passengers to spend 2,851 more hours on trains per weekday, compared to before the modifications. By mid-2018, the number of modified signals had grown to 1,800, before going up to 2,000 at years' end.

As of 2017, some of the oldest block signals in the system were 80 years old, and they broke down frequently, causing more delays and prompting the MTA to declare a state of emergency for the subway in 2017. An MTA investigation found that between December 2017 and January 2018, broken signals caused 11,555 train delays. In summer 2018, New York City Transit started evaluating twenty places where signal timers affect service the most.

Speed limits have remained relatively unchanged even as improvements in track geometry and car design allow trains to operate at higher speeds. Where possible, the agency has sought to increase speed limits. In summer 2018, New York City Transit president Andy Byford created the SPEED Unit to reduce delays by modifying operating and service practices. Soon after, the MTA began testing timers as part of the first systemwide review of timers to determine whether they are allowing trains to run at the posted maximum speed. The MTA eventually identified 267 faulty timer signals that disallowed trains from proceeding at the speed limit, and thus, forced trains to run significantly slower than intended. Train operators that pass the signals at or near their posted speeds have gotten punished due to the agency's strict discipline culture even though the signals are malfunctioning. Byford stated that "I don't think that safety and speed are incompatible." By December 2018, the SPEED Unit had found 130 locations where the speed limit could be increased, some of which were in the process of being fixed. It was also announced that speed limits would be doubled in some parts of the system, and that average speeds would generally be increased from 10–20 mph (16–32 km/h) to 40 mph (64 km/h). In January 2019, it was announced that 95% of timers had been tested, and that the 320 faulty timers discovered were in the process of being fixed. In addition, 68 locations had been approved for increases in speed limits. The following month, the MTA hired subway-signal expert Pete Tomlin. As of March 2021, the MTA had increased speed limits at 64 locations since the preceding year.

=== Chaining ===
To precisely specify locations along the New York City Subway lines, a chainage system is used. It measures distances from a fixed point, called chaining zero, following the path of the track, so that the distance described is understood to be the "railroad distance," not the distance by the most direct route ("as the crow flies"). This chaining system differs from the milepost or mileage system. The New York City Subway system differs from other railroad chaining systems in that it uses the engineer's chain of 100 feet (30.48 m) rather than the surveyor's chain of 66 feet (20.12 m). Chaining is used in the New York City Subway system in conjunction with train radios, in order to ascertain a train's location on a given line.

== Automatic Train Supervision ==
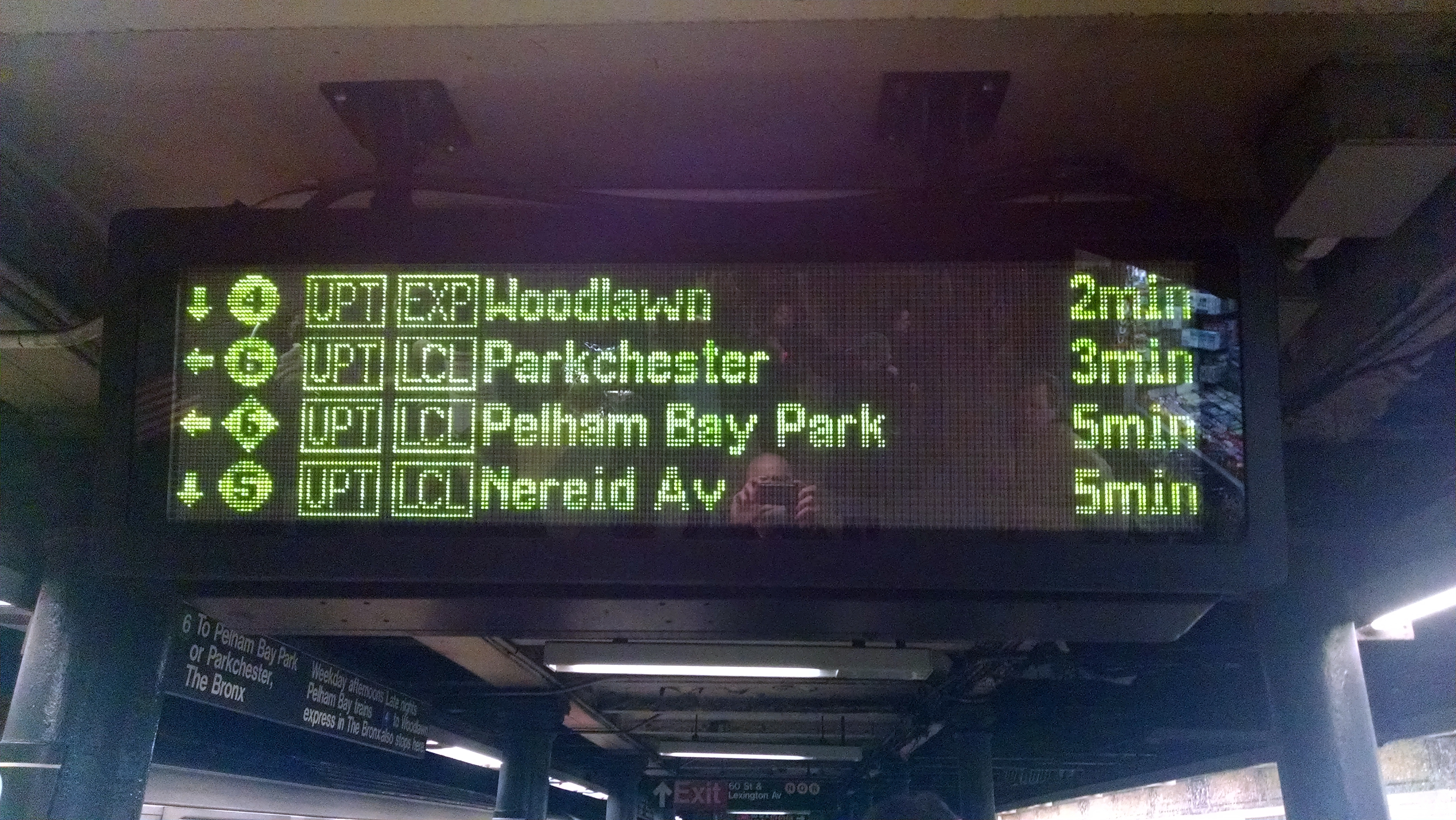
As a bonus feature, automatic train supervision allows for next-train indicators to be installed on A Division lines.

The New York City Subway uses a system known as Automatic Train Supervision (ATS) for dispatching and train routing on the A Division. The IRT Flushing Line, and the trains used on the 7 and <7> services, do not have ATS for two reasons: they are isolated from the main-line A Division, and they were already planned to get communications-based train control (CBTC) before the ATS on the A Division, or ATS-A project, had started. ATS allows dispatchers in the Operations Control Center (OCC) to see where trains are in real time, and whether each individual train is running early or late. Dispatchers can hold trains for connections, re-route trains, or short-turn trains to provide better service when a disruption causes delays. ATS is used to facilitate the installation of train arrival displays, which count down the number of minutes until a train arrives, on the A Division and on the BMT Canarsie Line. ATS was first proposed for the BMT Canarsie Line and the A Division in 1992, after a 1991 derailment killed five people on a 4 train that derailed near the 14th Street–Union Square station. CBTC for the Canarsie Line was proposed two years later.

The deployment of ATS-A involved upgrading signals to be compatible for future CBTC retrofitting, as well as consolidating operations from 23 different master towers into the Rail Control Center. Parsons Corporation helped the MTA install the system on the 175 miles (282 km) of A Division track, as well as doing some preliminary planning for ATS on the B Division. The project ended up costing $200 million. Its completion was delayed by five years, and it ultimately took 14 years to implement ATS-A. However, ATS-A's deployment was delayed due to several issues. The unique specifications of New York City Subway's equipment, the MTA's choice to use its own workers rather than outside contractors, and the inadequate training of contractors all contributed to delays. In addition, the MTA kept missing deadlines for testing ATS. The single biggest issue during the project, though, was the fact that MTA and the contractors did not cooperate well, which was attributed mostly to poor communication.

In 2006, 2008, and 2010, the MTA considered upgrading the B Division to ATS, but dismissed the proposal because it was too complex and would take too long. However, the MTA stated that due to high customer demand for train arrival displays, it would use a combination of CBTC and a new system, named the "Integrated Service Information and Management" (abbreviated ISIM-B). The simpler ISIM-B system, started in 2011, would essentially combine all of the data from track circuits and unify them into digital databases; the only upgrades that were needed were to be performed on signal towers. At the time, although the entire A Division had ATS, only seven lines of the B Division had a modernized control system (the IND Concourse Line, 63rd Street Lines, BMT Astoria Line, BMT Brighton Line, BMT Franklin Avenue Line, BMT Sea Beach Line, and BMT West End Line, as well as part of the IND Culver Line and the tracks around Queens Plaza). Originally slated to be completed by 2017, ISIM-B was later delayed to 2020. In 2015, the MTA awarded Siemens a contract to install a CBTC-compatible ATS system on most of the B division at a cost of $156,172,932. The contract excluded the Canarsie Line (which already had CBTC) and the IND Queens Boulevard Line and approaches (which was set to receive CBTC by 2021). The Queens Boulevard Line routes are served by the E, F, <F>, M, and R trains, but since the N, Q and W routes also share tracks with the R train in Manhattan, they will also have ATS installed. The cost of the ATS contract for the B division was later increased by $8.75 million.

== Automation ==
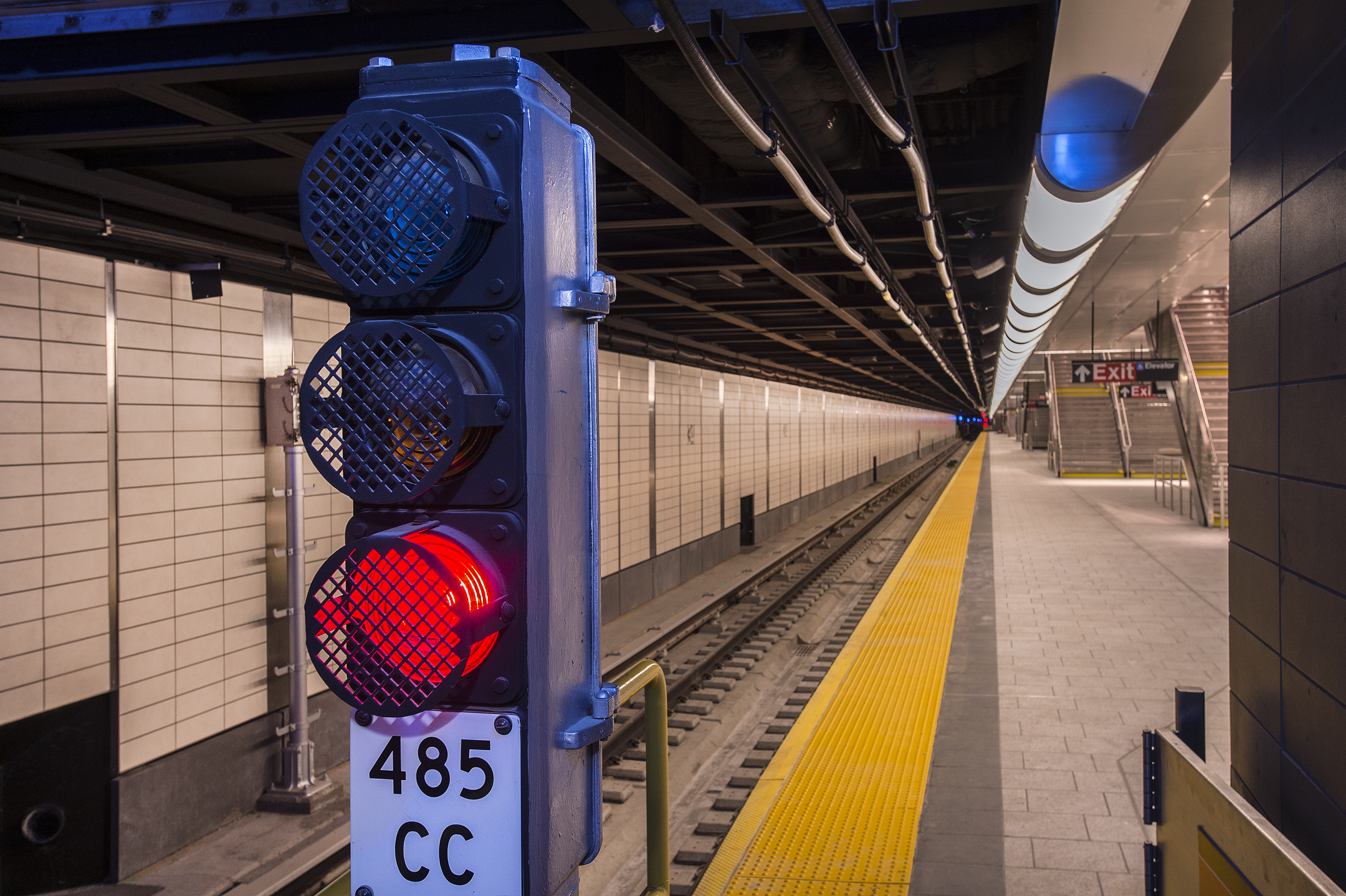
CBTC is being overlaid onto the traditional block signaling system. For example, this block signal located at the 34th Street–Hudson Yards station on the IRT Flushing Line, is being automated.

Trains using CBTC locate themselves based on measuring their distance in relation to fixed transponders installed between the rails. Trains equipped with CBTC have a transponder interrogator antenna beneath each carriage, which communicates with the fixed trackside transponders and report the trains' location to a wayside Zone Controller via radio. Then, the Controller issues Movement Authority to the trains. This technology upgrade allows trains to be operated at closer distances, slightly increasing capacity; allows the MTA to keep track of trains in real time and provide more information to the public regarding train arrivals and delays; and eliminates the need for complex interlocking towers. CBTC-enabled lines are controlled from the Operations Control Center in Midtown Manhattan, where 432 screens display the relative locations of trains. The trains are also equipped with computers inside the cab so that the conductor can monitor the train's speed and relative location. The wayside controllers themselves are located in enclosed boxes that can withstand floods and other natural disasters. The traditional block systems will remain on these lines despite the installation of CBTC.

As a communicating (CBTC equipped and enabled) train approaches, the Zone Controller automatically "upgrades", via the interlocking system, the fixed-block signal – which indicates "stop and stay" in this video – to a "flash green" aspect. Recorded at Times Square–42nd Street.

The block system handles all control and supervision of routes through interlockings including switch (point) control and switch status, for broken rail protection, and tracking of trains that are operating without CBTC. Lines equipped with CBTC are fully track-circuited with power frequency, single-rail track circuits. However, broken-rail protection is only guaranteed on one of the two rails of a track. Equipment aboard every train identifies the location of the train using wayside transponders as a basis. Once the Zone Controller has determined, based on track circuit information and train localization, that the CBTC train is a single discrete train, they use this information to grant movement authorities based on conditions ahead. The CBTC Zone Controller functions then as an overlay which only provides safe separation of trains and cannot do so without interaction from the Wayside (Legacy) Signaling system. Trains, with CBTC, can then operate closer together, although as before, platform dwell times and train performance are the true limiting factors in terms of headway performance. With the new system, signals and interlockings are still required, their job being done better by relay interlockings or Solid State Interlocking controllers. The ATS system at the Control Center is not a vital system and serves only to automate the routing of trains based on the overall timetable. The location of the train is also used to inform passengers of arrival times. The MTA's form of CBTC uses a reduced form of the old fixed-block signaling system, requiring that both be maintained at high cost.

Only newer-generation rolling stock that were first delivered in the early 2000s are designed for CBTC operation. These rolling stock include the R143s, R188s, and R160s. Initially, only 64 R160As (fleet numbers 8313–8376) were equipped with CBTC, but the remainder of the fleet was retrofitted with CBTC for Queens Boulevard automation. Future car orders are also designed to be CBTC-compatible, such as the R179. All R211s will have CBTC. After the retirement of the R68 and R68A cars, all revenue cars, except those on the G, J, M, and Z trains as well as the shuttles, will be equipped with CBTC. The BMT Canarsie Line was the first line to implement the automated technology, using Siemens's Trainguard MT CBTC system.

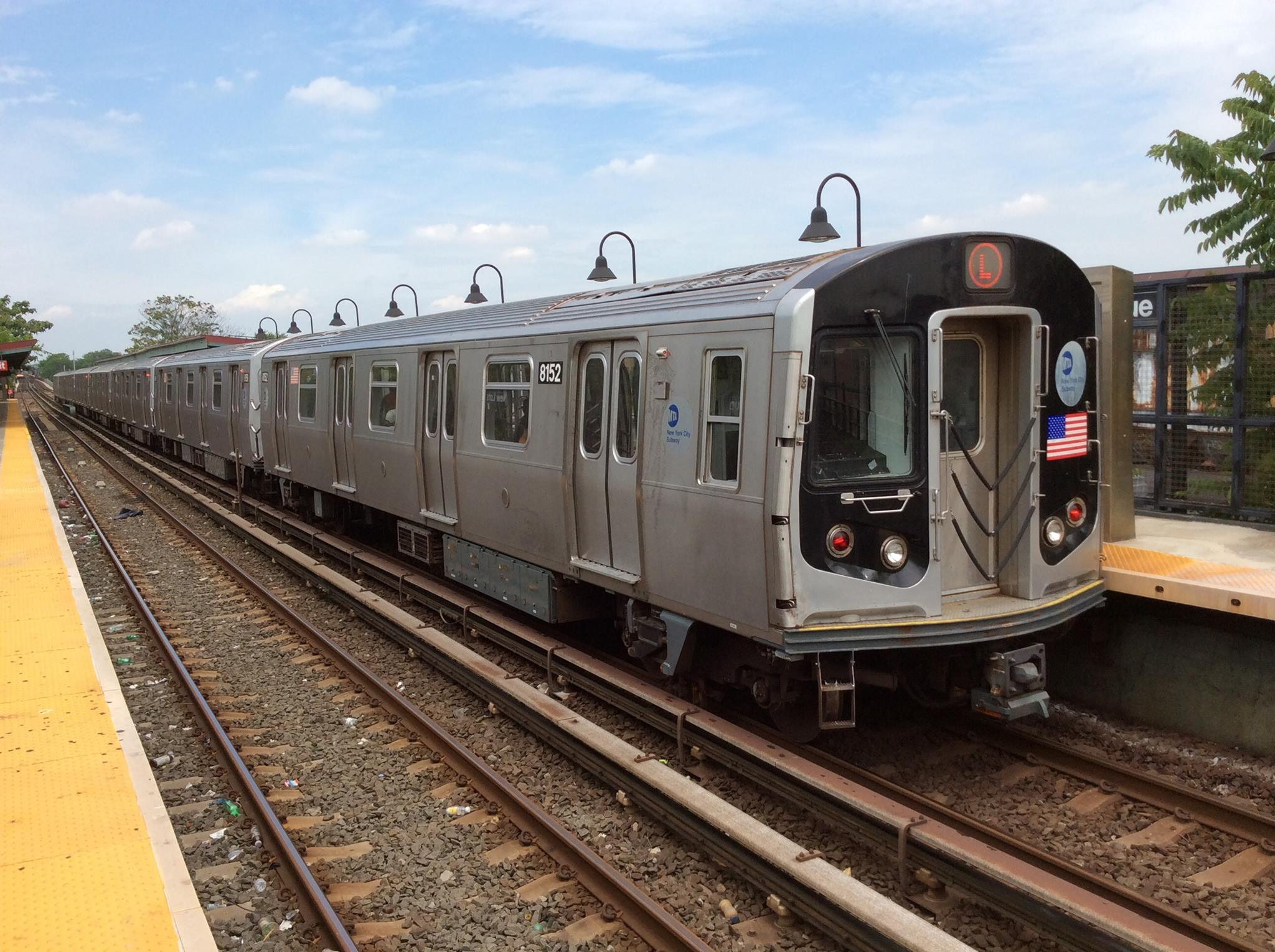
The R143 is the first automated rolling stock in the New York City Subway.

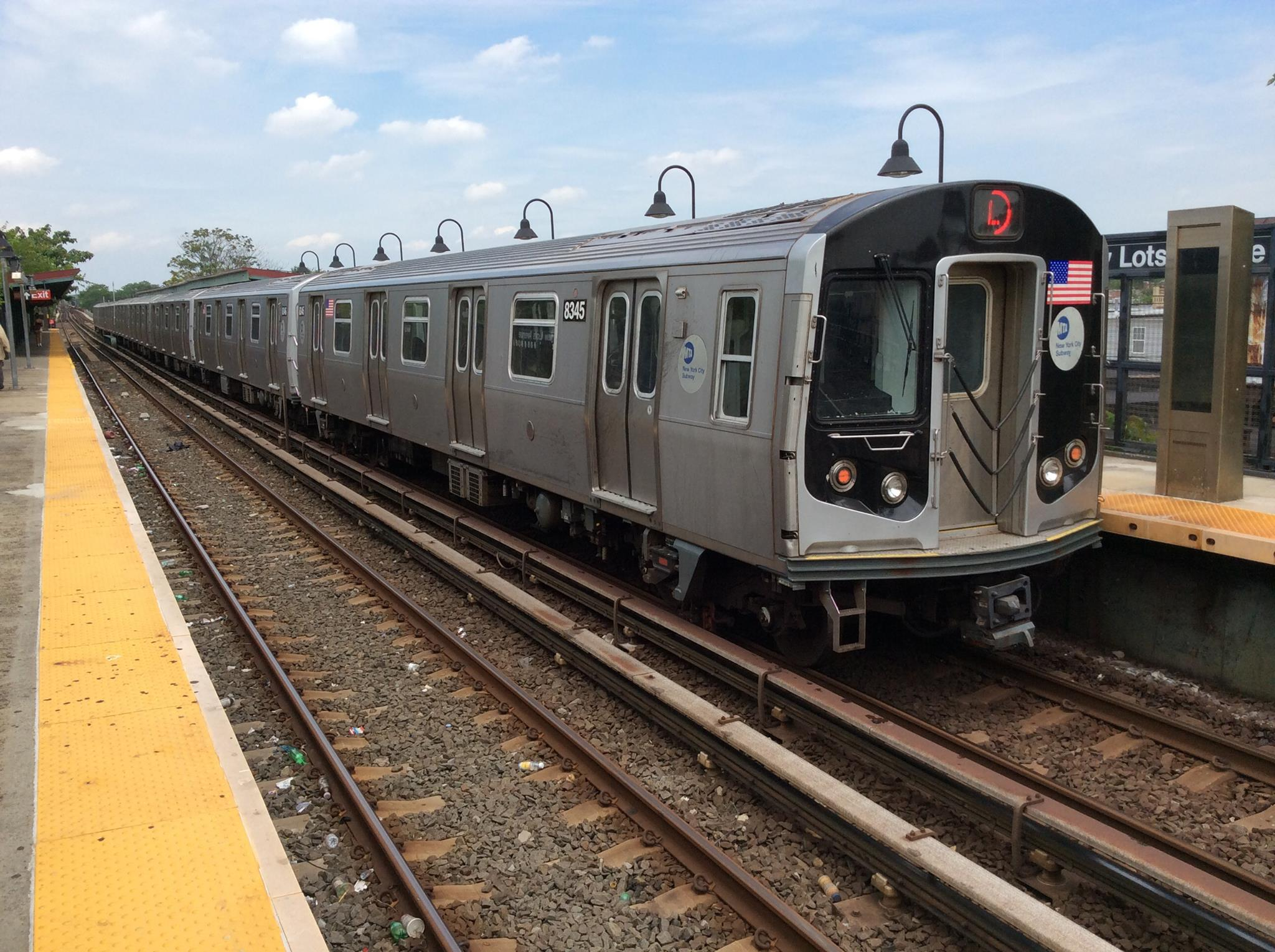
1,550 R160A cars like this one are automated, out of 1,662 total R160A/B cars, while the rest will be retrofitted with CBTC in the future. The R160 is the system's second automated rolling stock.

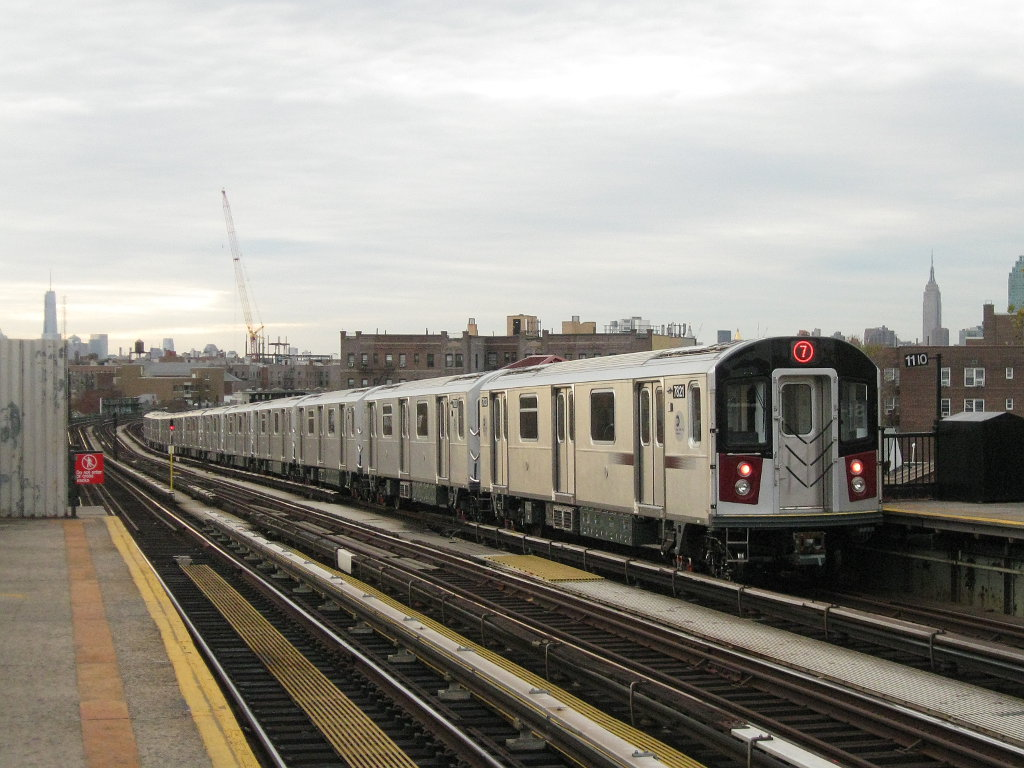
The R188 is the system's third automated rolling stock and second fully automated fleet.

Most subway services cannot significantly increase their frequencies during rush hours, except for the 1, G, J/Z, L, and M trains (the L service already is automated with CBTC). Therefore, transit planners are viewing the installation of CBTC as a way to free up track capacity for more trains to run, and have shorter headways between trains. However, installing CBTC in the New York City Subway is harder than in other systems due to the subway's complexity. The MTA hopes to install 16 miles (26 km) of CBTC-equipped tracks per year, while the Regional Plan Association wants the MTA to install CBTC signals on 21 miles (34 km) of tracks per year.

However, even without CBTC, the system is currently retrofitted to operate at frequencies of up to 60 trains per hour (tph) on the IND Queens Boulevard Line (30 tph on each of the local and express pairs of tracks made possible by the Jamaica–179th Street terminal, which has four sidings past the terminal for each set of tracks) and 33 tph on the IRT Flushing Line. The BMT Canarsie Line is limited to a 26 tph frequency due to the bumper blocks at both of its terminals and power constraints; however, the IRT Lexington Avenue Line operates at frequencies of 27 tph without CBTC. By contrast, lines on the Moscow Metro can operate at frequencies of up to 40 tph, since lines in the Moscow Metro, unlike most of the New York City Subway (but like the Jamaica–179th Street station), typically have four sidings past the terminals instead of bumper blocks or one or two sidings.

=== 42nd Street Shuttle automation ===
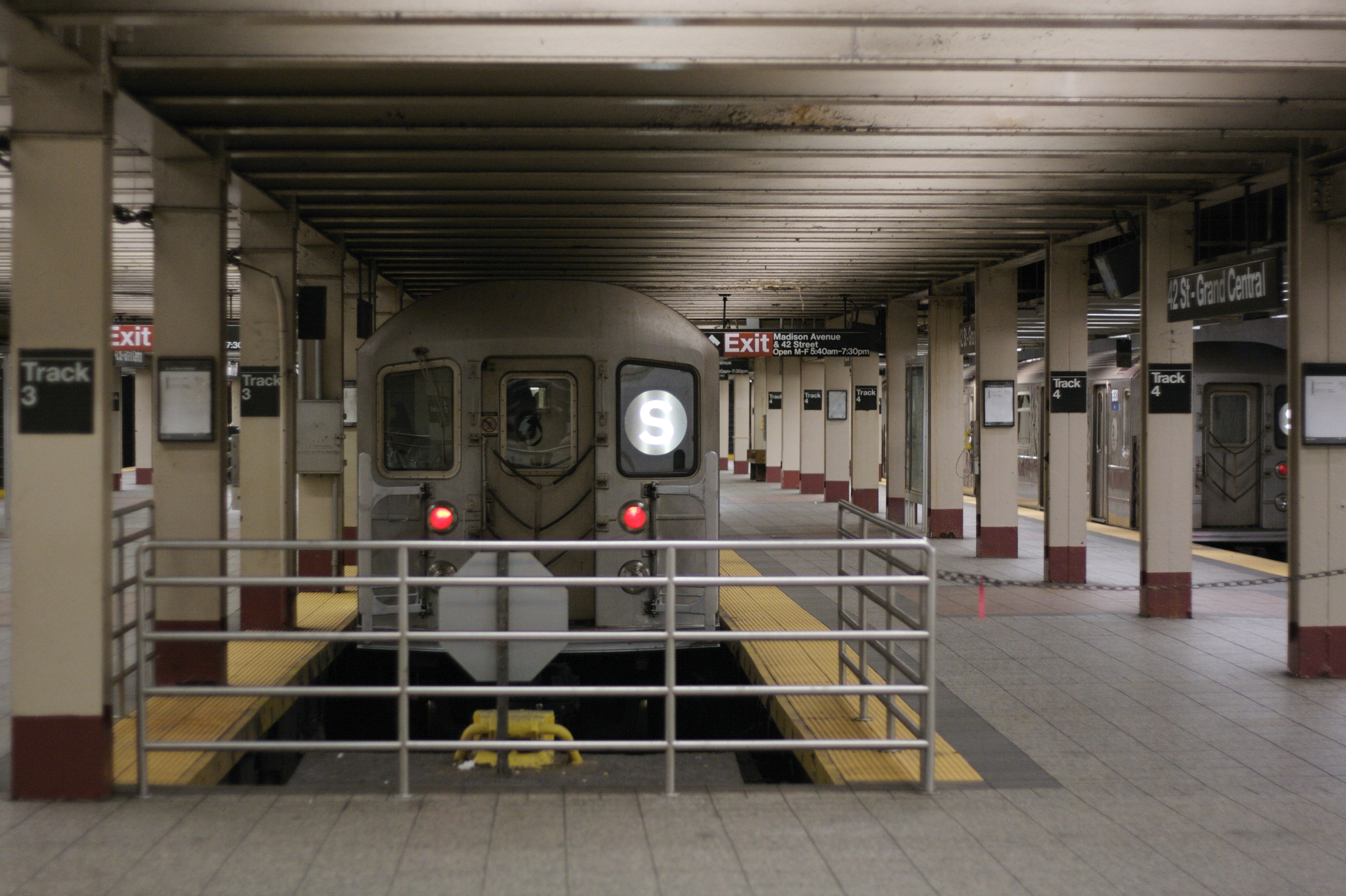
The 42nd Street Shuttle was the first line in the New York City Subway to be automated, using Track 4 (shown on right).

The 42nd Street Shuttle, which runs from Grand Central to Times Square, was briefly automated from 1959 to 1964. The chairman of the Board of Transportation, Sidney H. Bingham, in 1954, first proposed a conveyor belt-like system for the shuttle line, but the plan was canceled due to its high cost. Subsequently, in 1958, the newly formed New York City Transit Authority (NYCTA) started studying the feasibility of automatically operated trains which did not have motormen. The NYCTA conducted the study in conjunction with the General Railway Signal Company; the Union Switch and Signal division of the Westinghouse Air Brake Company; General Electric; and Western Electric. The next year, NYCTA president Charles Patterson made a speech about the results of the automated mass transit study. It was estimated that on the 42nd Street Shuttle alone, full automation could result in a $150,000 annual savings. By late 1961, the NYCTA was also considering automating the IRT Flushing Line, Culver Shuttle, and BMT Franklin Avenue Line if the 42nd Street Shuttle test were successful.

==== Sea Beach Line test track ====
Starting in December 1959, the fully automatic train was tested on the BMT Sea Beach Line express tracks between the 18th Avenue and New Utrecht Avenue stations. The idea of automation at that time relied on commands that were sent to the train while the train is at a station, to keep its doors open. The train was equipped with a telephone system to keep voice communication with human dispatchers at the two shuttle terminals. At each station there was a cabinet that housed 24 relay systems that made up electronic dispatchers. The relays controlled the train's starting, acceleration, braking, and stopping, as well as the opening and closing of the car doors. When the commands cease, the doors would promptly close. A new series of commands would start the train and gradually accelerate it to 30 miles per hour (48 km/h), its full speed, slowing to 5.5 miles per hour (8.9 km/h) when coming into the two stations. When entering stations, the train passed through a series of detectors, which caused a series of tripper arms at trackside to go into the open position if the train was going at the correct speed. If the train was going too quickly, the tripper arms would stay upright and the train's brakes would automatically be set.

The equipment was built and installed by General Railway Signal and Union Switch and Signal. The NYCTA contributed between $20,000 to $30,000 on the project and supplied the three R22 subway cars to be automated. The bulk of the money, between $250,000 and $300,000, was contributed by the two companies, which paid for installation, maintenance and technological oversight of the automation process, including signaling. The automation of the shuttle was opposed by the president of the Transport Workers Union, Michael J. Quill, who pledged to fight the project and called the device "insane."

The R22s were fitted with different types of brake shoes, to see which one would negotiate the rail joints better. It was eventually found that the automated trip took 10 seconds longer than manual operation (about 95 seconds, compared to 85 seconds). As the tests on the Sea Beach Line progressed, grade time stops were added to ensure safety on the line, and on the 42nd Street Shuttle. The train was dubbed SAM, and was to operate on Track 4 of the shuttle line.

==== Implementation and demise ====
In the afternoon of January 4, 1962, the three-car automated train began service, with a ceremony. The trains carried a stand-by motorman during the six-month trial period. The train had scheduled to begin service on December 15, 1961, but Quill threatened a walkout at all of the city's municipal and privately owned transit if the train ran. Under the new contract with the TWU, the NYCTA agreed to put a motorman in the train during the experimental period. While in its experimental period, the automated train was only operating during rush hours. In July, the test was extended for three more months, and in October the test was extended for six additional months. The chairman of the NYCTA, Charles Patterson, was disappointed by the automated shuttle train, doubting that the train could be operated without any transit personnel on board.

Initially, the automation of the shuttle was expected to save $150,000 a year in labor costs; however, with one employee still required on the train, there would essentially be no savings. If the test succeeded, it was planned to automate the IRT Flushing Line, the BMT Canarsie Line, the BMT Myrtle Avenue Line, the Franklin Avenue Shuttle, and the Culver Shuttle. These lines were chosen because the train services on all five lines, as well as the 42nd Street Shuttle, did not regularly share tracks with any other services. At the time, the NYCTA did not have plans to automate the whole system. The rest of the system included a myriad of instances where several different services merged and shared tracks, and automating the rest of the system would have been logistically difficult. The Canarsie and Myrtle Avenue Lines were later cut from the plans, but it was expected that the other three lines would be automated if the test was successful.

A severe fire at the Grand Central station on April 21, 1964, destroyed the demonstration train. The fire began under a shuttle train on track 3, and it became larger, feeding on the wooden platform. The train on Track 1 was saved when the motorman saw smoke, and reversed the train. The basements of nearby buildings were damaged. Tracks 1 and 4 returned to service on April 23, 1964, while Track 3 returned to service on June 1, 1964. The reinstallation of Track 3 was delayed because of the need to replace 60 beams that were damaged in the fire. Reconstruction of the line continued through 1967.

In 1978, senior NYCTA executive John de Roos said that the authority would consider running automated trains following the completion of the 63rd Street lines, which were then scheduled to be opened in 1984 or 1985.

Automated rapid transit technology was later installed in the San Francisco Bay Area's BART system and the Philadelphia metropolitan area's PATCO Speedline. After the fire that destroyed the automated shuttle subway cars, ideas for New York City Subway automation lay dormant for years, until an intoxicated motorman caused a train crash at Union Square station that killed 5 people and injured 215. The collision was a catalyst to a 1994 business case outlining arguments for automatic train operation (ATO) and CBTC, which led to the automation of the BMT Canarsie Line starting in the early 2000s. In 1997, the year the Canarsie Line project started, the whole subway was to be automated by 2017, but by 2005, the completion date had been pushed back to 2045.

=== CBTC test cases ===
The first two lines, totaling 50 miles (80 km) of track miles, received CBTC from 2000 to 2018. The two lines with the initial installations of CBTC were both chosen because their respective tracks are relatively isolated from the rest of the subway system, and they have fewer junctions along the route.

==== Canarsie Line CBTC ====
The Canarsie Line, on which the L service runs, was chosen for CBTC pilot testing because it is a self-contained line that does not operate in conjunction with other subway lines in the New York City subway system. The 10-mile length of the Canarsie Line is also shorter than the majority of other subway lines. As a result, the signaling requirements and complexity of implementing CBTC are easier to install and test than the more complicated subway lines that have junctions and share trackage with other lines. Siemens Transportation Systems built the CBTC system on the Canarsie Line.

The CBTC project was first proposed in 1994 and approved by the MTA in 1997. Installation of the signal system was begun in 2000. Initial testing began in 2004, and installation was mostly completed by December 2006, with all CBTC-equipped R143 subway cars in service by that date. Due to an unexpected ridership increase on the Canarsie Line, the MTA ordered more R160 cars and these were put into service in 2010. This enabled the agency to operate up to 20 trains per hour up from the May 2007 service level of 15 trains per hour, an achievement that would not be possible without the CBTC technology or a redesign of the previous automatic block signal system. The R143s and R160s both use Trainguard MT CBTC, supplied by Siemens. In the 2015–2019 Capital Program, funding was provided for three more electrical substations for the line so service could be increased from 20 to 22 trains per hour. Also included in the Capital Program is the installation of automatic signals on the line to facilitate the movement of work trains between interlockings. By 2025, the original CBTC equipment was nearing the end of its 25-year useful life, and the original CBTC system's computer servers, radios, and software were planned to be upgraded.

==== Flushing Line CBTC ====
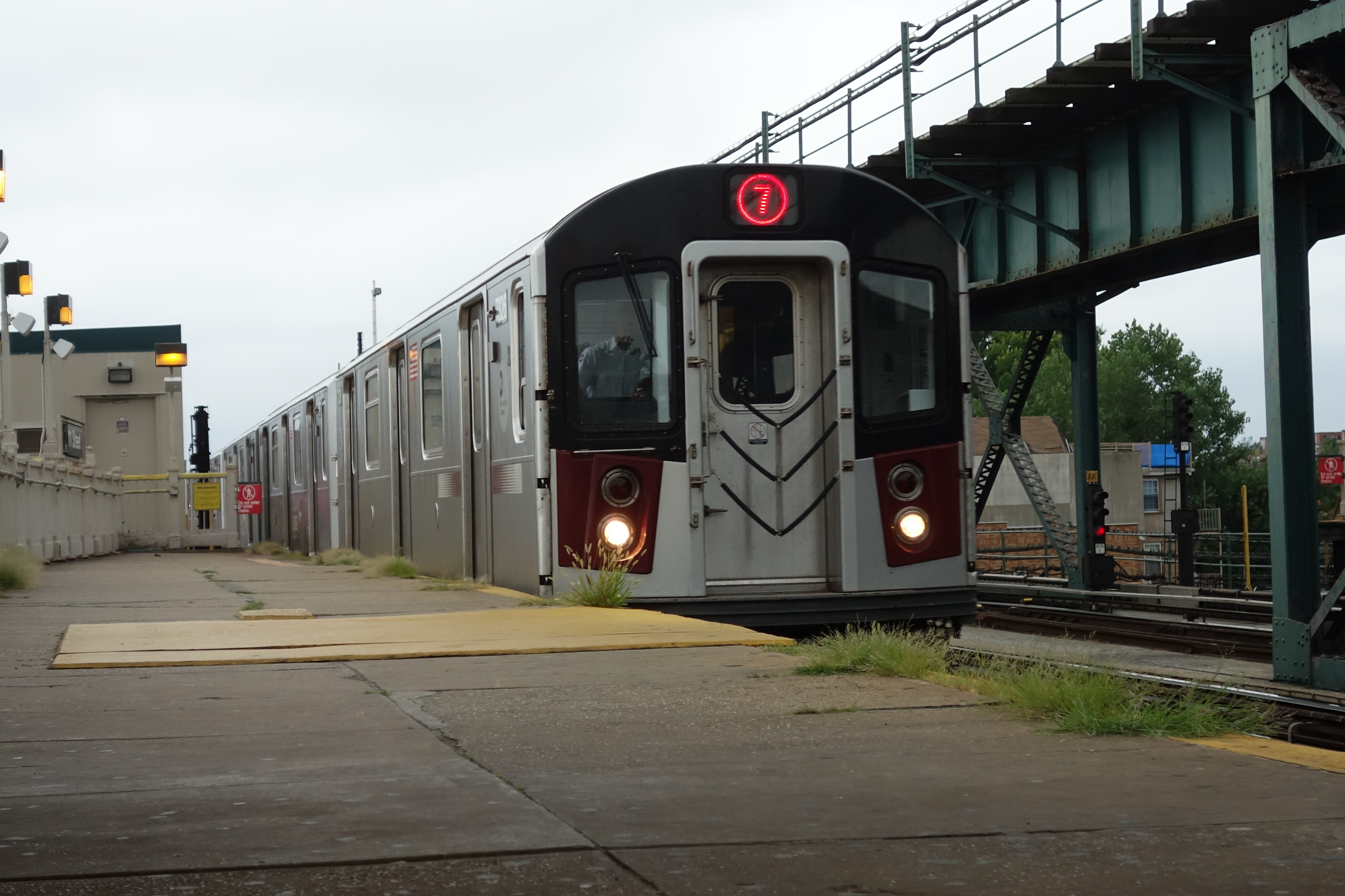
The R188 subway cars constructed for the Flushing Line have CBTC.

The next line to have CBTC installed was the pre-existing IRT Flushing Line and its western extension opened in 2015 (served by the 7 and <7> trains). The Flushing Line was chosen for the second implementation of CBTC because it is also a self-contained line with no direct connections to other subway lines currently in use, aside from the merging of express and local services. The 2010–2014 MTA Capital Program provided funding for CBTC installation on the Flushing Line, with scheduled installation completion in 2016. The R188 cars were ordered in 2010 to equip the line with compatible rolling stock. This order consists of new cars and retrofits of existing R142A cars for CBTC.

In late winter 2008, the MTA embarked on a 5-week renovation and upgrade project on the 7 and <7> trains between Flushing–Main Street and 61st Street–Woodside to upgrade signaling and tracks for CBTC. On February 27, 2008, the MTA issued an Accelerated Capital Program to continue funding the completion of CBTC for the 7 and <7> trains and to begin on the IND Queens Boulevard Line (E, F, and <F> trains). The installation is being done by Thales Group, which was awarded the contract for the project on June 16, 2010. CBTC, as well as the new track configuration added in the line's 2015 extension, allowed the 7 and <7> services to run 2 more tph during peak hours, increasing service from 27 to 29 tph.

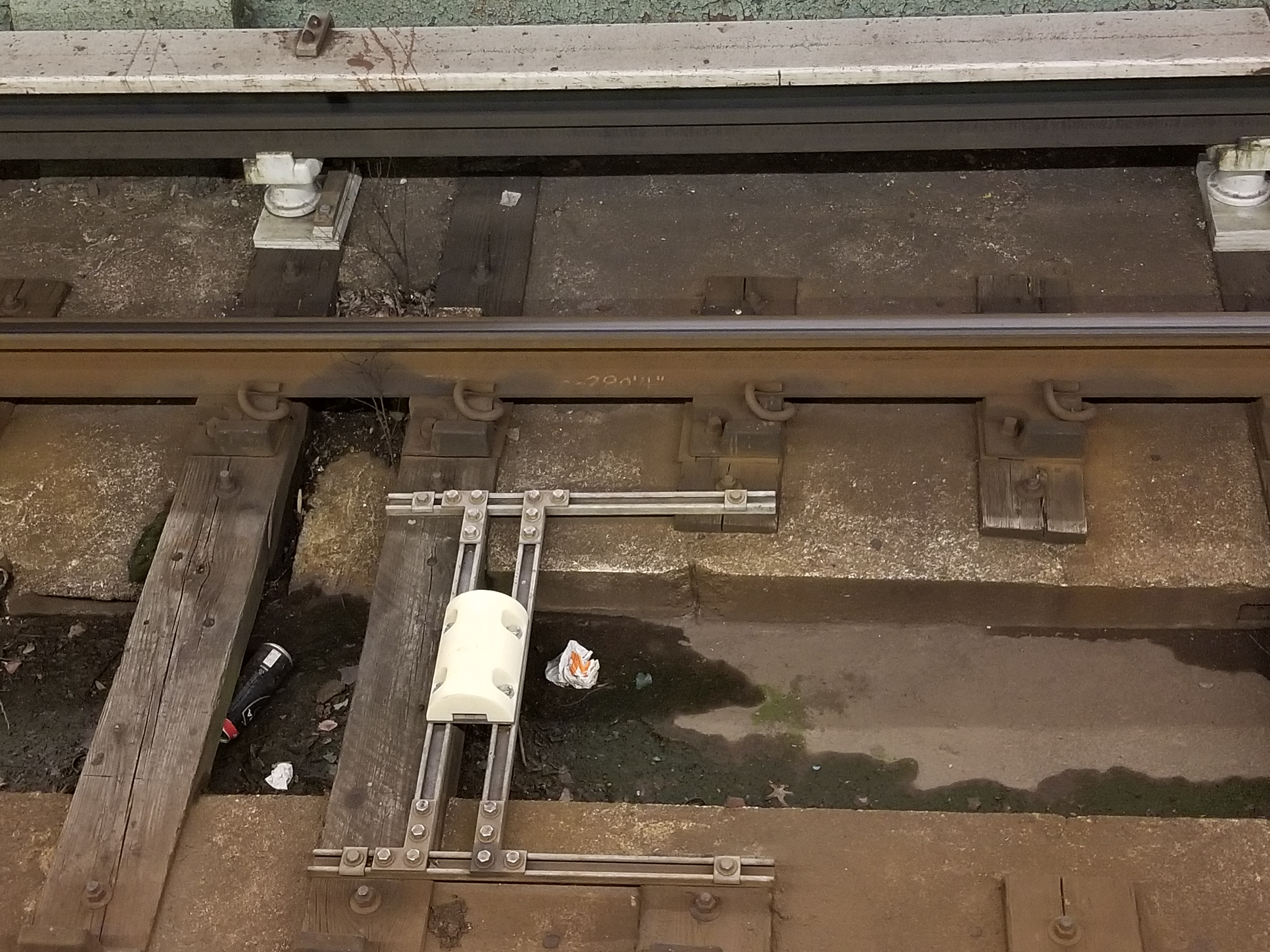
A transponder at Mets–Willets Point. CBTC-equipped trains use such fixed transponders to locate themselves.

The first train of R188 cars began operating in passenger service on November 9, 2013. Test runs of R188s in automated mode started in late 2014. However, the CBTC retrofit date was later pushed back to 2017 and then to 2018 after a series of problems that workers encountered during installation, including problems with the R188s. The project also went over budget, costing $405 million for a plan originally marked at $265.6 million. In February 2017, the MTA started overnight testing of CBTC on the Flushing Line from Main Street to 74th Street, with CBTC being used in regular passenger service by August and full implementation in October. By February 2018, the rest of the line from 74th Street to 34th Street–Hudson Yards was projected to begin operating in CBTC service in fall 2018. CBTC was activated on the segment between 74th Street and the Steinway Tunnel over eight weekends in mid-2018. The remaining segment of the Flushing Line, between the Steinway Tunnel and 34th Street–Hudson Yards, began operating in CBTC service on November 26, 2018. However, the MTA also stated that several more weeks of maintenance work would be needed before the system was fully operational. The project was substantially completed on March 7, 2019, and full automatic train operation began in May 2019, allowing for the increase in service to 29 tph. The MTA's Independent Engineering Consultant noted that CBTC can support the operation of additional service, and recommended that NYCT use a simulation of the line to identify line constraints and bottlenecks, and undertake projects to increase the capacity of the line.

=== Wider installation of CBTC ===
Map of lines where CBTC is being installed or where CBTC is active as of September 2026: CBTC active; CBTC installation in progress

As part of the 2015–2019 Capital Program, there will be 73.2 miles (117.8 km) of lines that will get CBTC, at a cost of $2.152 billion (part of a $2.766 billion automation/signaling project that is being funded in the Capital Program). Another $337 million is to be spent on extra power substations for CBTC. This installation of CBTC would require Siemens and Thales to cooperate on the installation process for all of the lines; they had worked separately in installing the Canarsie Line's and Flushing Line's CBTC systems, respectively. In a 2014 report, the MTA projected that 355 miles of track would receive CBTC signals by 2029, including most of the IND, as well as the IRT Lexington Avenue Line and the BMT Broadway Line. The MTA was also planning to install CBTC equipment on the IND Crosstown Line, the BMT Fourth Avenue Line and the BMT Brighton Line before 2025. On the other hand, Regional Plan Association prioritized the Lexington Avenue, Crosstown, Eighth Avenue, Fulton Street, Manhattan Bridge, Queens Boulevard, Rockaway, and Sixth Avenue subway lines as those in need of CBTC between 2015–2024.

In March 2018, New York City Transit Authority president Andy Byford announced that he had created a new plan for re-signaling the subway with CBTC, which would only take 10 to 15 years, compared to the previous estimate of 40 years. However, this would be very expensive, costing $8 to $15 billion. Byford subsequently announced his $19 billion subway modernization plan at an MTA board meeting in May 2018. The plan involved upgrading signals on the system's five most heavily used physical lines, as well as accelerating the deployment of ISIM-B to all subway lines that did not already have either automatic train supervision or CBTC.

By 2023, CBTC projects on the entire Crosstown, Lexington Avenue, Archer Avenue IND, and Queens Boulevard lines were planned. In addition, CBTC work already underway on the Eighth Avenue Line south of 59th Street and on the Culver Line from Church Avenue to West Eighth Street–New York Aquarium would be completed. Moreover, under Byford's plan, the MTA would start retrofitting the entire Broadway Line from Queensboro Plaza to DeKalb Avenue, via both the Montague Street Tunnel and the Manhattan Bridge; the entire Fulton Street and Rockaway Lines; the IND 63rd Street Line; the IND Sixth Avenue Line from 59th Street–Columbus Circle to Jay Street–MetroTech and DeKalb Avenue via the Manhattan Bridge; the IRT Broadway–Seventh Avenue Line south of 96th Street; the Lenox Avenue Line; and a portion of the IRT White Plains Road Line to Jackson Avenue by 2028 at the latest. This would require nightly and weekend closures of up to two and a half years for every line that would be affected, although weekday service would be maintained. As part of the plan, all subway cars would be CBTC-equipped by 2028.

The 2015–2019 Capital Program was revised in April 2018 to fund the upgrade of negatively-polarized direct current cables and the replacement of segments of contact rail with low resistance contact rail along Lexington Avenue to improve power distribution and increase capacity and to upgrade negative cables along Queens Boulevard. The draft 2020–2024 Capital Program calls for adding CBTC to several more lines, namely the entire Lexington Avenue Line from 149th Street—Grand Concourse to Nevins Street; the entire Crosstown; the Astoria Line to 57th Street; the IND 63rd Street line; the IND Fulton Street Line west of Euclid Avenue station; the remainder of the IND Queens Boulevard Line; and the IND Archer Avenue Line. The implementation of CBTC on the 63rd Street Line from 21st Street–Queensbridge to 57th Street and on the Fulton Street Line from Jay Street to Ozone Park had been slated for the 2025–2029 Capital Program. The Astoria Line was not one of the lines originally planned for CBTC installation in the Fast Forward plan.

==== Culver Line test track and southern section ====
Funding was allocated for the installation of CBTC equipment on one of the IND Culver Line express tracks between Fourth Avenue and Church Avenue. The total cost would be $99.6 million, with $15 million coming from the 2005–2009 capital budget and $84.6 million from the 2010–2014 capital budget. The installation was a joint venture between Siemens and Thales Group. The test track project was completed in December 2015. This installation was intended to be permanent. Had Culver Line express service been implemented at the time, it would not have used CBTC, and testing of CBTC on the express track would have been limited to off-peak hours. Test trains on the track were able to successfully operate using the interoperable Siemens/Thales CBTC system. That system became the standard for all future CBTC installations on New York City Transit tracks as of 2015. A third supplier, Mitsubishi Electric Power Products Inc., was given permission to demonstrate that its technology could be interoperable with the Siemens/Thales technology. The $1.2 million Mitsubishi contract was approved in July 2015.

As part of the 2015–2019 Capital Program, the section of the line between Church Avenue and West Eighth Street–New York Aquarium would receive CBTC. Three interlockings between Church Avenue and West Eighth Street—at Ditmas Avenue, Kings Highway, and Avenue X—would be upgraded. A contract for CBTC overlay, as well as modernization of the Ditmas Avenue and Avenue X interlockings, was awarded in February 2019, with substantial completion expected in June 2023. Tutor Perini was the primary contractor and installer. The timeline was delayed because of difficulties in installing new longer-lasting ties on the tracks.

==== Queens Boulevard Line ====
===== QBL West =====
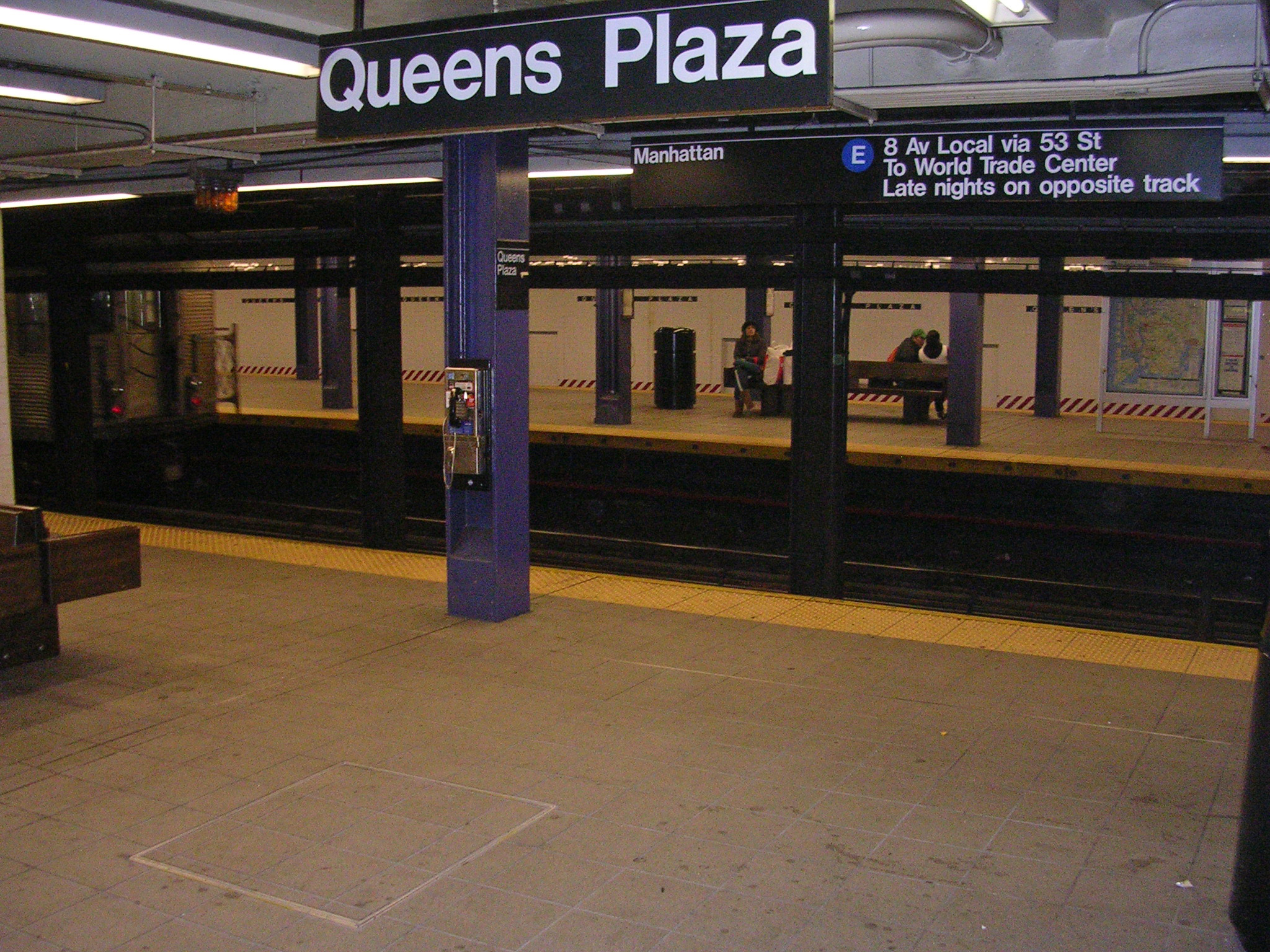
The MTA will install CBTC on the Queens Boulevard Line (pictured here at Queens Plaza).

In the 2010s, the MTA implemented CBTC on the western portion of the IND Queens Boulevard Line (QBL West). CBTC was to be installed on this line in five phases, with phase one (50th Street/8th Avenue and 47th–50th Streets–Rockefeller Center to Kew Gardens–Union Turnpike) being included in the 2010–2014 capital budget. The 63rd Street Connection to 21st Street–Queensbridge would also be retrofitted with CBTC. The total cost for eventually automating the entire Queens Boulevard Line is estimated at over $900 million, The automation of the Queens Boulevard Line means that the E, F, and <F> services will be able to run 3 more trains during peak hours (it currently runs 29 tph). This will also increase capacity on the local tracks of the IND Queens Boulevard Line. However, as the line hosts several services, installation of CBTC on the line can be much harder than on the Flushing and Canarsie lines.

On December 15, 2014, a contract to provide consulting services to support the installation of CBTC was awarded to Systra Engineering. Following the success of the Culver Line CBTC test track, the MTA awarded a $205.8 million contract for the installment of phase one to Siemens on August 24, 2015, and Thales on August 31, 2015. These two suppliers were the only MTA-qualified suppliers that could install CBTC on New York City Transit tracks. Seven of eight interlockings in the first-phase section of the line would be upgraded under this contract. In conjunction with the project, 309 four- or five-car sets of R160s will receive Trainguard MT CBTC, the same CBTC system installed on trains assigned to the BMT Canarsie Line, which will be compatible with the SelTrac CBTC system installed on the tracks. Of the 309 units set to be converted for CBTC-compatibility, 305 will receive new onboard equipment, which NYCT contractors will install in 301 of these 305 units. (Note: There are 16 four-car sets that were equipped with CBTC as part of the Canarsie Line automation project, out of 351 four- and five-car sets total. The Queens Boulevard Line CBTC contract will bring the number of CBTC-equipped R160 sets to 325 out of 351 total sets.) As of June 2019, 155 units had been retrofitted. As of April 2022, the number of R160 sets with CBTC had been increased to 335, of which 310 units were already equipped.

Planning for phase one started in 2015 and was complete by February 2016, with major engineering work following in November 2016. On December 22, 2016, as part of the second phase of CBTC installation on the Queens Boulevard Line, L.K. Comstock & Company Inc. was awarded the $223.3-million contract to upgrade existing signals and install communications, fiber-optic, and CBTC infrastructure for the new signal system. The core of phase one was supposed to be completed by 2020 or 2021. However, by April 2018, the MTA projected that most of the infrastructure from 50th Street to Union Turnpike would be substantially completed by mid-2022. The testing of the integrated Siemens/Thales system began in August 2018 and was completed by May 2019, followed by the start of train-operator training simulations in June 2019. As of November 2018, phase one was to be substantially completed by March 2021, followed by phase two in July 2022. On March 26, 2019, Systra's contract to provide consulting services was extended by 23 months to support the extension of CBTC from Union Turnpike to 179th Street on the Queens Boulevard Line and to Jamaica Center on the IND Archer Avenue Line (QBL East). By November 2020, various difficulties and delays had pushed back the substantial completion date to the third or fourth quarter of 2021. A consultant for the MTA predicted that the CBTC system could not be activated as planned in March 2021 because of a lack of immediate funding and a shortage of CBTC-equipped trains. The forecast was then pushed back to the fourth quarter of 2021. The final section was activated in February 2022. ATO operation commenced in early March 2024.

===== QBL East =====
The 2015–2019 Capital Program was revised in April 2018 to fund to the design for the expedited installation of CBTC on the Lexington Avenue Line, the IND Archer Avenue Line and the Queens Boulevard Line east of Kew Gardens–Union Turnpike, known as QBL East. The draft 2020–2024 Capital Program calls for CBTC installation on the remainder of the IND Queens Boulevard Line to Jamaica–179th Street station, as well as the IND Archer Avenue Line. On December 15, 2021, the MTA Board approved the first of three contracts to install CBTC on the eastern portion of the Queens Boulevard Line.

Under the project, interlockings at Briarwood, Parsons Boulevard, 169th Street, and 179th Street would be modernized. The 169th Street interlocking would be separated from the 179th Street interlocking. In addition, the north end of Union Turnpike Interlocking will receive CBTC functionality. Following the Eighth Avenue Line CBTC project, track circuits will be replaced with axle counters. EJ Electric is the installer and Mitsubishi is the CBTC supplier. The cost of the project will be $539.5 million, and completion was forecasted for the second quarter of 2026. In December 2021, the contract for the installation of the project was awarded to EJ Electric while the contract for the supplying of CBTC equipment was awarded to Mitsubishi. In April 2022, the MTA was still negotiating with Siemens for the data communications system equipment contract. This will be Mitsubishi's first CBTC contract with the MTA, expanding the interoperability demonstration to three suppliers from two. By late 2026, the completion of the QBL East CBTC project had been postponed to January 2029.

==== Eighth Avenue Line ====
Funding for the design of CBTC on the IND Eighth Avenue Line from 59th Street–Columbus Circle to High Street is provided in the 2015–2019 Capital Program, along with the modernization of interlockings at 30th Street and north of 42nd Street, and the removal of an unused interlocking south of 42nd Street. The design of the Eighth Avenue Line CBTC project will be done concurrently with the Queens Boulevard Line West and East automation, allowing the E route to be semi-automated when the project is done. It will get two new electrical substations to support CBTC upgrades. Additionally, the R179 and R211 fleets will be made compatible with CBTC. Construction was originally scheduled to begin in October 2018, but a contract for CBTC installation was later pushed back to the first quarter of 2019. In March 2019, in preparation for the implementation of CBTC on the Eighth Avenue Line, the MTA board ratified a contract with Thales Group for the installation of CBTC equipment on the R211 fleet.

On January 13, 2020, the MTA announced that it had awarded the contract to L. K. Comstock & Company, Inc. for $245.8 million. The signaling for the contract will be provided by Siemens. This will be the first CBTC project in the system to use axle-counters instead of insulated joints and track circuits. Axle counters are more resilient to debris and water, making them more reliable, and have been used for decades in systems around the world, and will reduce the time it takes to complete CBTC projects, the cost of completing work, and maintenance and life-cycle costs. Axle counters also allow CBTC testing before cutovers, reducing the time it takes to complete cutovers and any risks associated with them. As of November 2020, the entire project is budgeted at $733.6 million. The project was to be completed by January 2025. Work was 57 percent complete in April 2022. Due to delays in the completion of the R211 rolling stock contract, an alternative cutover plan was developed to allow CBTC on the local tracks to be placed into use before the express tracks. By late 2026, the timeline had been postponed to January 2029.

==== Crosstown Line and Culver Line northern section ====
The MTA planned to put the contract to install CBTC on the Crosstown Line to Hoyt–Schermerhorn Streets station and modify the three interlockings on the line up for bid in 2022. The cost of the project is estimated to be $556.4 million. On May 16, 2022, the MTA put out the RFP for the design-build contract to install CBTC on the Crosstown Line. Court Square Interlocking will be modified to interface with CBTC while mechanical interlockings at Bedford–Nostrand Avenues and Nassau Avenue will be replaced. Relay rooms and towers at Bedford–Nostrand Avenues and Nassau Avenue will be decommissioned as part of the project. Following the Eighth Avenue and QBL East projects, this project will include the use of axle counters instead of track circuits. Work on the project is expected to take four years. In December 2022, the MTA announced that it would award a $368 million design–build contract to Crosstown Partners, a joint venture between Thales Group and TC Electric LLC. The contract includes not only the Crosstown Line between Court Square and Bergen Street, but also the Culver Line between Bergen Street and Church Avenue.

Unlike previous CBTC projects in the system, the Crosstown Line CBTC project will take a "CBTC-centric" approach, in which existing wayside interlockings as well as AWS systems will be replaced with new software logics in enhanced, centralized CBTC Zone Controllers – known as integrated Zone Controllers (iZCs). This will minimize the amount of wayside and room signaling equipment, reducing future maintenance burden. Also, the train-to-wayside communication will be based on 5G technology. The MTA indicated in July 2025 that the Crosstown CBTC upgrade would be delayed due to the need to add new 5G transmitters to the R211s used on the G route. By late 2026, the Crosstown CBTC upgrade had been delayed at least 14 months.

==== Fulton Street Line ====
On November 9, 2022, the MTA put out the RFP for the design-build contract to install CBTC on the Fulton Street Line between High Street and Euclid Avenue, on the Sixth Avenue Line from York Street to Jay Street–MetroTech, the Culver Line from Jay Street to both the upper and lower levels of Bergen Street, and on the Crosstown Line from Hoyt–Schermerhorn Streets to Bergen Street. This project will also use axle counters, and is expected to take six years. The installation of CBTC from High Street to Euclid Avenue is funded as part of the MTA's 2020–2024 Capital Program, while CBTC installation on the rest of the Fulton Street Line from Euclid Avenue to Ozone Park–Lefferts Boulevard was proposed as part of the MTA's 2025–2029 Capital Program. In December 2025, L.K. Comstock received a $1.3 billion contract to install CBTC on both sections of the Fulton Street Line; the installation was to be funded using revenue from congestion pricing in New York City. CBTC work on the Fulton Street Line began in late 2026.

==== Sixth Avenue Line ====
As part of the 2015–2019 Capital Program, the 34th Street and West Fourth Street interlockings on the IND Sixth Avenue Line were completed at a cost of $356.5 million. The interlocking upgrades would support CBTC installation on the Queens Boulevard, Culver, and Eighth Avenue lines. In December 2021, it was announced that the Sixth Avenue Line between Broadway–Lafayette Street and Jay Street–MetroTech would receive CBTC; funding for this section is not provided in the 2020–2024 Capital Program. In March 2022, the MTA announced that it would install CBTC on the Sixth Avenue Line between Jay Street and 21st Street–Queensbridge. As part of the Sixth Avenue CBTC project, the Jay Street Interlocking will be reconstructed.

On June 9, 2022, the MTA released an RFP for a program management and project management consulting services for the MTA's CBTC program. The base contract included these services for CBTC design–build projects on the Crosstown Line and the Fulton Street Line between High Street and Hoyt–Schermerhorn Streets, while the first three options were for three separate projects to install CBTC on the 63rd Street Line and Sixth Avenue Line between 21st Street–Queensbridge and Jay Street, the fourth consisted of a single project to install CBTC on the entirety of the 63rd Street and Sixth Avenue Lines, while the five consisted of a project to equip two Track Geometry Cars with carborne CBTC equipment. The contract would be for 86 months. In June 2022, the MTA announced it planned to solicit a contract on switch replacement and interlocking work as part of the Sixth Avenue CBTC project in 2023.

==== Other lines ====
On July 25, 2022, it was announced that the MTA Board would vote on July 27 on an amendment to the 2020–2024 Capital Program. The amendment would postpone the Lexington Avenue Line and Astoria Line CBTC projects to the 2025–2029 Capital Program and use those funds to install CBTC on the Sixth Avenue Line. MTA officials said that lower peak ridership meant installing CBTC on the Lexington Avenue and Astoria Lines, which was aimed at increasing capacity, was less of a priority as those lines had newer signaling than on the Sixth Avenue Line, which has 80-year old signaling. Another factor in the delay has been delays by subway car manufacturers. Lexington Avenue Line CBTC is reliant on the proposed R262 subway car order, while Sixth Avenue Line CBTC could make use of existing trains and the under-construction R211 trains. With the postponement of the Lexington Avenue Line CBTC project, fewer R262 trains will be ordered.

As part of the construction of Phase 2 of the Second Avenue Subway, signaling on Phase 1 would be upgraded to CBTC. As part of the 2025–2029 Capital Program (announced in September 2024), the entirety of the Broadway, Rockaway, Nassau Street, and Astoria lines would be upgraded to CBTC. These projects would cost an estimated $5.4 billion and would upgrade signals on about 75 miles (121 km) of track. No upgrades to lines in the Bronx were included in the 2025–2029 Capital Program.

=== Ultra-wideband signaling and other proposals ===
In 2017, the MTA started testing ultra-wideband radio-enabled train signaling on the IND Culver Line and the 42nd Street Shuttle. The ultra-wideband train signals would be able to transmit more data wirelessly in a manner similar to CBTC, but can be installed faster than CBTC systems. The ultra-wideband signals would have the added benefit of allowing passengers to use cellphones while between stations, instead of the current setup where passengers could only get cellphone signals within the stations themselves.

The same year, it was reported that full implementation of CBTC systemwide might take 40 to 50 years. Following the subway system's state of emergency that year, MTA Chairman Joe Lhota described the timeline of CBTC installation as "simply too long," instead proposing ways to speed up the work and hosting the Genius Transit Challenge to find quicker ways to upgrade the signals. Some of the proposals included a wireless signaling system, a completely new concept that had never been tested in any other railroad or subway network. In March 2018, the MTA announced that four entities had submitted two winning proposals to the challenge. One of the proposals used ultra-wideband signaling technology. The other proposal entailed installing sensors and cameras on trains, with minimal installations on tracks. New York City Transit (NYCT) Chairman Andy Byford stated that he wanted to test ultra-wideband technology at the same time that more established systems, like CBTC, are being installed. In March 2019, contracts for UWB installation on the Canarsie and Flushing Lines were awarded. Four trains on each line were equipped with UWB. The MTA then tested the equipment for nine months, and in a January 2020 press release, announced that the test had been "successful".

At the May 2020 Capital Program Oversight Committee meeting, it was announced that the two UWB pilot programs, done with different technology and companies, were largely completed, with data collection set to be completed in June 2020. The MTA found that UWB was effective in determining the location of trains, and that it was looking at using it on future projects to replace the transponder-based train localization systems used on existing CBTC projects. UWB would provide more accurate information on the positioning of trains, and allow for simpler carborne installation. In the short term, the MTA was advancing interoperability standards for the new technology. During the pilot program, the MTA investigated the potential use of RADAR, HD cameras and LIDAR alongside UWB.

In June 2021, the MTA Board approved the modification of two UWB proof of concept contracts with Thales and Siemens to establish interoperability between the two systems. The MTA deemed that since both systems were found to be acceptable, to encourage competition between the subcontractors for the two companies (Humatics for Siemens and Piper for Thales) and maintain resiliency in the UWB system, it made sense for Humatics to redesign its UWB system to allow its system to communicate and be used with Piper's system. As of March 2023, the interoperability has not yet been demonstrated.

On April 7, 2022, the MTA put out a Request for Information (RFI) looking for information on technology that would allow work trains to efficiently and safely operate on subway lines equipped with CBTC and enable to reduction or elimination of Auxiliary Wayside Signaling (AWS) trip-stops and other standard wayside signaling infrastructure. Currently, work trains, which are not equipped with carborne CBTC equipment, have to make use of the AWS system, consisting of conventional AWS signals, track circuits or axle counters. NYCT conducted a study on equipping work trains with CBTC in 2018.

Another RFI, put out on May 20, 2022, called for proposals to update the existing S733 Signal Standard Specification so it could be simplified for use in CBTC, with a major reduction or elimination of AWS-related work in future CBTC installations. Currently, CBTC is treated under the S733 standard as an overlay of the AWS, and installing the AWS requires a major amount of work.

Finally, on June 1, 2022, the MTA put out an RFI seeking proposals on how to simplify wayside signaling infrastructure to reduce costs for the layout, construction, and design of relay rooms and reduce the need to have track outages to test the completed signaling system before placing it into service. Currently, the MTA equips each relay room with local control panels, programmable logic controllers, a relay-based interlocking system or a solid state interlocking, and zone controllers with related power distribution and network connections. The RFI specified that respondents should consider looking at ways to eliminate as much wayside infrastructure, such as train-stops and line-side signals, including related boxes, relay room-based equipment and lineside cabling, as possible, replace programmable logic controllers and interfaces with logic resting in the Zone Controller or ATS system, eliminate or combine local control panels and related interfaces and equipment, and replace them with remote terminals, reduce or eliminate the number of relays through the use of direct-drive input and output signals, and eliminate or combine other specific room-based equipment.

== See also ==
- Application of railway signals – Overview of train traffic management
- Autopilot – System to maintain vehicle trajectory in lieu of direct operator command
- Institution of Railway Signal Engineers – International professional body
- Railroad chronometer – Timepiece used in operation of trains
- Railroad switch – Mechanism to transfer rail vehicles from one track to another
- Railway semaphore signal – Form of fixed railway signal
- Railway signal – Visual signal device for railway engineers
- Railway signalling – Principle of signals used to control railway traffic
- Railway slide fence – Structural fence designed to physically stop falling rocks from reaching the tracks
- Toronto subway and RT signals
- Traffic control – Branch of logistics concerning the movement of vehicles
- Train speed optimization – A system that reduces the need for trains to brake and accelerate
- Wrong-side failure – Dangerous failure of railway signalling equipment
