= 1991 Union Square derailment =

New York City Subway derailment

- The damaged R62 car at the site of the accident

Details
- Date: August 28, 1991; 12:12 a.m.
- Location: North of 14th Street–Union Square
- Coordinates: 40.73602°N 73.98952°W
- Country: United States
- Line: IRT Lexington Avenue Line
- Operator: New York City Transit Authority
- Incident type: Derailment
- Cause: Intoxication, driver error, speeding

Statistics
- Trains: 1
- Passengers: 216
- Deaths: 5
- Injured: 161 (16 seriously)
Track diagram

On August 28, 1991, a 4 Lexington Avenue Express train on the New York City Subway's IRT Lexington Avenue Line derailed as it was about to enter 14th Street–Union Square station, killing five people. It was the worst accident on the subway system since the 1928 Times Square derailment. The motorman was found at fault for alcohol intoxication and excessive speed and served time in prison for manslaughter.

== Before the accident ==
The motorman assigned to operate the train, 38-year old Robert E. Ray, reported to the Woodlawn terminal on the 4 route to begin his eight-hour shift at 11:30 p.m. on August 27, 1991, fifteen minutes late. Despite visible signs that should have had Ray disqualified for duty that night, including bloodshot eyes and wearing tennis shoes, the dispatcher at the Woodlawn terminal that night, Percival Hossack, allowed Ray to go on-duty and assigned him a portable radio for use. Ray then took control of a ten-car R62 train, along with conductor David Beerram, departing Woodlawn at 11:38 p.m., six minutes late. Among the passengers on board was another conductor, Steve Darden, who had just finished his shift and was riding the train back home.

Almost immediately, Ray overran the first stop, Mosholu Parkway, by five cars. Then Ray overran the next stop, Bedford Park Boulevard-Lehman College, by one car. In both instances, Beerram admonished Ray, but did not pull the emergency brake, which would have required a complex restarting procedure and made Ray's condition apparent, or radio the New York City Transit Authority (NYCTA)'s command center about Ray's operation, as required by NYCTA regulations. As Ray's operation of the train became more erratic continuing down the line, both Beerram and the off-duty Darden warned him multiple times about his operation, but no one on board pulled the emergency brake to stop the train.

== Accident ==
During the night of August 27–28, 1991, there was construction on the IRT Lexington Avenue Line that required southbound express trains to switch to the local track. This required the trains to slow down to 10 miles per hour (16 km/h) before entering a diamond crossover to access a "pocket track" between the southbound local and express tracks. The pocket track had been part of the original design of the line, and was intended so that trains switching between tracks would not delay local and express trains that were not going through the switch.

At about 12:12 a.m. on August 28, 1991, 34 minutes after leaving Woodlawn, Ray's erratic operation of the train finally led to disaster, as the train heading southbound with approximately 216 passengers, going at nearly 50 miles per hour (80 km/h), too fast for a tripcock to stop the train in time, derailed at the pocket track north of the 14th Street–Union Square station. Five passengers died, mostly in the second car, almost immediately, and 161 passengers were seriously injured. Several support columns were destroyed, causing the street above to immediately subside by 0.5 inches (1.3 cm). It was the deadliest subway accident to happen in New York since the Times Square disaster of 1928.

The first car, 1440, which struck a steel pillar, was cut in half and had its roof sheared off, but its motorman's cab was not damaged. The second, 1439, was folded in half by the barrier between the express and local tracks. Car 1437 was split in half and folded around a support beam, and cars 1436 and 1435 were also seriously damaged. The cars lay tangled between the support beams. The train was damaged so badly that one emergency responder said that he "couldn't even tell where one car ended and another began at some points".

== Rescue, investigation, and trial ==
Because the accident occurred within earshot of the Transit Police command post in the Union Square station, and within the sight of two Transit Police officers waiting on the platform, response was rapid. Among the first to respond was Moira Smith, who later died responding to the September 11 attacks. The accident location was very close to the platform, which was used for triage, and field treatment took place at street level. Working conditions at the site were very cramped and hot, and it took until approximately 3:30 a.m. until Darden, the off-duty conductor on board and last remaining injured passenger, was extracted from the train. In total, 121 passengers and 24 emergency responders (who suffered heat-related conditions or minor cuts and bruises) were taken to hospitals; sixteen passengers were injured seriously enough to be admitted. Debris was found as far away as 150 feet (46 m) from the lead car.

Ray later said that he had drunk heavily the day before his work shift because he was depressed that his ex-girlfriend would not let him see their two children, and that at the time of the accident he had fallen asleep. Ray was not hurt in the crash, so he walked into the station and identified himself, then sat on a park bench during the rescue operation. The NYPD later reported that he drank three beers after the accident. Ray was arrested at 5:30 a.m. while returning to his apartment building, and when tested approximately thirteen hours after the accident, his blood alcohol level was 0.21; the legal level in New York State was 0.10 at the time.

The facts that Ray had overshot the first two stops in the Bronx and had been warned repeatedly by Beerram and Darden to reduce his speed, and had not braked approaching 14th Street–Union Square, were brought up in the ensuing trial. On October 15, 1992, a jury acquitted Ray of murder but found him guilty of five counts of second-degree manslaughter, and on November 6 he was sentenced to five to fifteen years in prison plus terms of between one and seven years for assault on 26 of the injured passengers, all to run concurrently. He was released in April 2002.

== Aftermath ==
The day after the crash, the MTA announced that it would start randomly checking subway motormen and bus drivers for illegal substances, such as drugs or alcohol. Using figures from another fatal incident the previous year, the MTA estimated that it would have to pay between $5 million and $10 million to accident victims.

Service on the Lexington Avenue Line resumed six days after the accident, on September 3, after completion of the site investigation and four days of round-the-clock debris removal and construction work, including the Labor Day holiday. The five R62 subway cars destroyed in the accident—the lead car, 1440, and four of the five following cars, 1435, 1437, 1439, and 1436 were permanently taken out of service and removed from NYCTA property. (Note: Car 1438 was not seriously damaged, so it was later returned to service along with cars 1431–1434, the other four cars in the train. Car 1438 was converted from a non-driving car, or "B" car, to a cab car, or "A" car, in the process. At the time, all R62s were linked in five-car sets, but originally, each car could operate as a single unit.) In addition to the support columns, two sets of track, a third rail, two signal sets, two switches, and an air compressor room had been destroyed. The switches and tracks were rebuilt, with the NYCTA removing the "pocket track" on which the train had derailed and replacing it with a simple diamond crossover. In addition, the NYCTA added diverging grade time signals to force trains to slow down earlier before crossing between tracks.

Reporters at New York Newsday won the 1992 Pulitzer Prize for Spot News Reporting for their coverage of the accident.

A 1992 study commissioned after the accident by the NYCTA found that some signals in the subway system, including several on the Lexington Avenue line, were spaced too closely for a train traveling at maximum speed to have time to stop, confirming the finding of safety investigators immediately after the crash; the issue resurfaced after a rear-end collision on the Williamsburg Bridge in 1995. Ultimately, the accident led to the phasing-in of communications-based train control and automated trains on the New York City Subway in the 21st century.

The National Transportation Safety Board recommended that speed indication systems be installed on subway cars. The NYCTA had been testing speed indication systems since 1990. By May 1994, gear unit type speed indication systems were installed on the R44s and R46s, and ring type speed indication systems were purchased for installation on 40% of R62As. In May 1994, a $203,064 bid was awarded for the procurement of 132 Doppler radar type speed indication systems for the R62s, the type of train damaged in the accident.

In 2015, Robert Ray was critically injured in a hit and run accident in the Bronx.

== See also ==
Other deadly crashes in the New York City Subway:

- Malbone Street Wreck
- Ninth Avenue derailment
- 1928 Times Square derailment
- 1995 Williamsburg Bridge collision
