= Moira Smith =

American police officer (1963–2001)

- Smith aiding an office worker, Edward Nicholls, during the 9/11 attacks.
- Born: Moira Ann Reddy; February 14, 1963; Brooklyn New York, U.S.
- Died: September 11, 2001 (aged 38); South Tower, World Trade Center, New York City, U.S.
- Cause of death: Collapse of 2 World Trade Center (September 11 attacks)
- Resting place: Saint Charles Cemetery, East Farmingdale, New York, U.S.
- Occupation: Police officer
- Known for: Aiding victims of the September 11 attacks

Moira Ann Reddy Smith (February 14, 1963 – September 11, 2001) was an American police officer for the New York Police Department who was killed during the September 11 attacks. She was the only female NYPD officer killed in the attacks.

== Life and death ==
=== Early life and career ===
Moira Smith was born on February 14, 1963, in Bay Ridge, Brooklyn, and grew up in Queens Village, Queens. She attended Niagara University in Lewiston, New York, and majored in criminal justice.

She became an officer for the New York City Transit Police in December 1988. The New York City Transit police merged into the New York City Police Department (NYPD) in 1995, and Smith was assigned to the 13th Precinct in Manhattan.

Smith was one of the first officers to respond to the 1991 Union Square derailment, in which five people were killed and more than 160 injured. She worked for the next 24 hours to rescue and treat the wounded until being sent to the hospital for smoke inhalation. Smith and her husband James (commonly known as Jim), also a police officer, were awarded distinguished duty medals for their actions.

=== September 11 attacks ===
Memorials near Ground Zero on September 12, 2002. At right, a March 2002 news clipping announces that Smith's remains were recovered from the site.

On the morning of September 11, 2001, Smith was on duty near the World Trade Center (WTC) complex when the first plane struck the North Tower (1 WTC). She was among the first NYPD officers to respond and the first to report events to the department, radioing in news of the attack and helping escort witnesses from the scene back to her precinct.

Smith then returned to the World Trade Center, entering the South Tower (2 WTC) and climbing multiple flights of stairs to guide injured people to safety. The day after the attacks, the Daily News published a photo of Smith aiding a bloodied office worker named Edward Nicholls, who survived Flight 175 hitting the 78th floor in the South Tower.

Survivors later recalled that Smith led groups down through smoke-filled stairwells, repeatedly going back up to help more people. She was last seen on the lower floors of the South Tower before it collapsed, rushing to aid a woman reportedly having an asthma attack. Smith and numerous other first responders initially survived the collapse but subsequently died while trapped in the debris or following their escape or rescue from the rubble. On the 25th anniversary of the 9/11 attacks, Smith's daughter publicly played a fragment of her final radio transmission, in which she called for help after the South Tower's collapse.

After months of search at the WTC Ground Zero site, which Smith's husband assisted, her remains and badge were finally recovered in March 2002. Several days later, she received a funeral at Our Lady of Lourdes Church in Queens Village.

== Legacy ==
NYPD memorial honoring Smith and others at St. Michael's Cemetery.

=== Honors and memorials ===
Moira Ann Reddy Smith received the NYPD Medal of Honor posthumously on December 4, 2001, for her actions on 9/11. In 2026, the NYPD named police dog Moira Ann after her.

She was listed by Glamour and Ms. among Women of the Year for 2001 and was named Woman of the Year by the NYPD's Policewomen's Endowment Association. President George W. Bush cited Smith's heroism in remarks at the White House on September 10, 2005.

In 2002, a section of Shore Boulevard in Queens was designated P.O. Moira Smith Way, and the Staten Island Ferry vessel Moira Smith was named for her. In 2012, New York City renamed a playground in Madison Square Park the Police Officer Moira Ann Smith Playground in her honor.

In 2014, NYPD Commissioner Bill Bratton unveiled a portrait of Smith at the 13th Precinct in Manhattan. Smith's badge and shield are on display at the National September 11 Memorial & Museum.

=== Family ===
Moira Smith's husband, James Smith, continued to serve with the NYPD after her death and has spoken publicly about her legacy. Their daughter, Patricia, who was 2 years old when Moira died, has also given public interviews to honor her memory. Moira's cousin, Montour county commissioner Trevor Finn, became a volunteer firefighter because of her.
