= Angela Povilaitis =

American attorney

Angela Povilaitis is a former assistant attorney general of Michigan. In 2018, she gained national media attention as the attorney who led the prosecution of Larry Nassar, the ex-USA Gymnastics and Michigan State University doctor accused of molestation by hundreds of women and girls.

== Early life and education ==
Povilaitis grew up in Baldwin, Michigan, and graduated from Wayne State University Law School in 2000.

== Career ==
Povilaitis is now a staff policy attorney with the Michigan Domestic and Sexual Violence Treatment and Prevention Board.

=== Prosecution of Larry Nassar ===
Povilaitis, then a Michigan assistant attorney general who prosecuted cases and ran a statewide cold-case sexual assault project, built a case against Larry Nassar with Michigan State University Police Det. Lt. Andrea Munford after former gymnast Rachael Denhollander filed a complaint and spoke publicly in September 2016 against Nassar, prompting other women to come forward.

Povilaitis brought ten charges against Nassar, involving nine victims between 1998 and 2015 in two counties, before he pled guilty. More than 140 others filed civil lawsuits against Nassar, with MSU officials fielding all but fifteen of them. Aly Raisman, McKayla Maroney, Gabby Douglas and other Olympic gymnasts also accused Nassar of sexual assault during nationally televised interviews or on social media.

In January and February 2018, more than 200 women spoke before two Michigan county judges about the impact that Nassar's abuse had on their lives, and their testimonies were broadcast around the world.

Povilaitis has won awards for her work, including the first Outstanding Advocate for Victims of Crime award and the 2018 Glamour Women of the Year.
