= 1995 Williamsburg Bridge subway collision =

New York City Subway crash

1995 Williamsburg Bridge collision
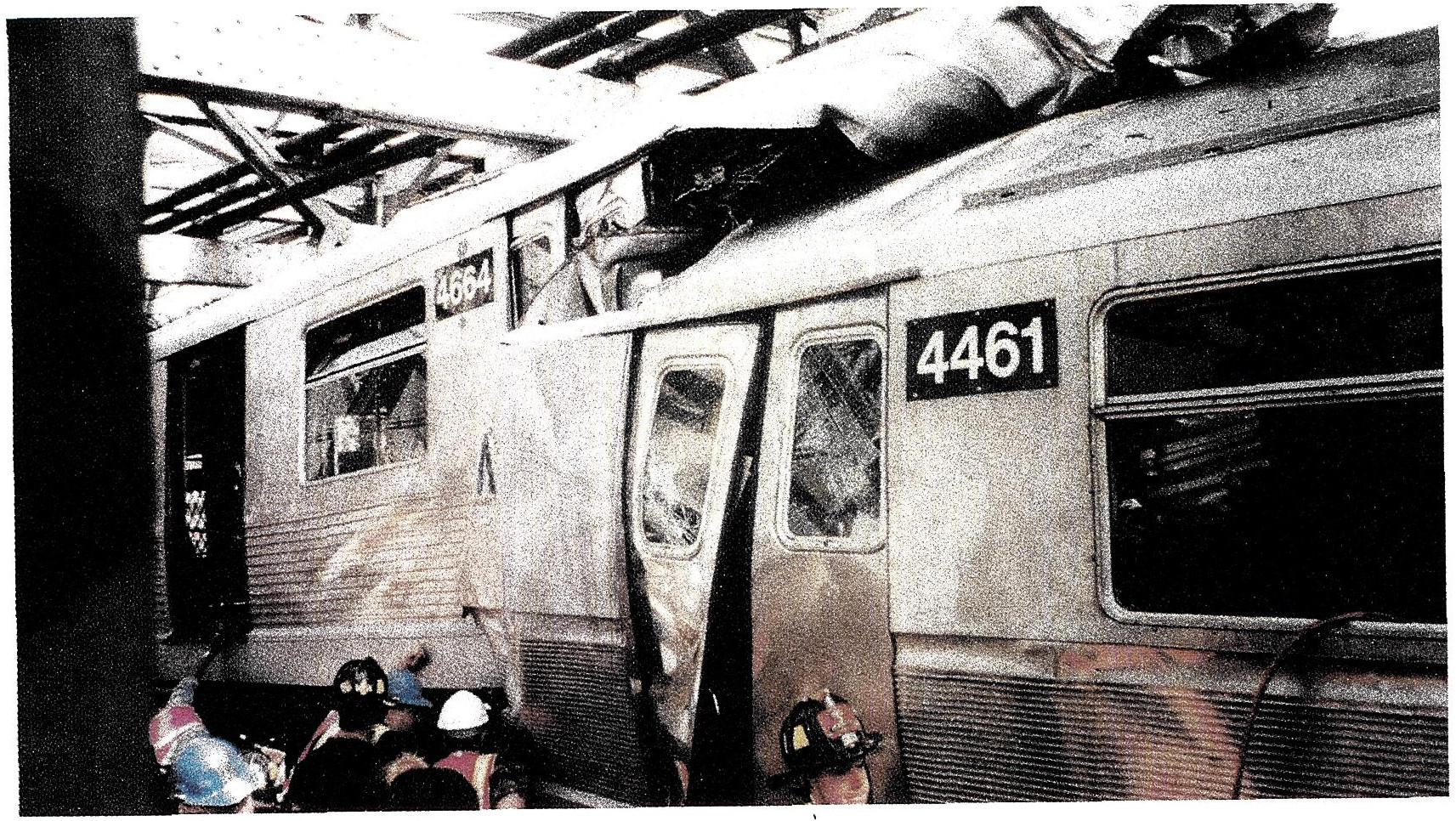
- The damaged trains after the collision

Details
- Date: June 5, 1995; 6:18 a.m.
- Location: Williamsburg Bridge
- Country: United States
- Operator: New York City Transit Authority
- Incident type: Collision
- Cause: Driver fatigue and inadequate signal systems

Statistics
- Trains: 2
- Deaths: 1
- Injured: 54

On June 5, 1995, at 6:18 a.m. (EDT), a New York City Subway J train crashed into the back of a stopped M train on the Williamsburg Bridge, which connects Brooklyn and Manhattan in New York City. The motorman of the J train, 46-year-old Layton Gibson, died upon impact, and 54 passengers were injured.

== Accident ==
At approximately 6:12 a.m. EDT, an M train was running westbound across the Williamsburg Bridge, headed toward Manhattan, when the motorman encountered a red signal and stopped the train. The M train had been forced to stop because an unscheduled work train was directly in front of it.

At 6:18 a.m., the J train was running at full speed along the Williamsburg Bridge's Brooklyn approach. It ran several yellow and red signals before running into the back of the stationary M train. The rear-end collision killed Layton Gibson, the J train's motorman, who had been a subway motorman for 14 years. 54 passengers were injured, including one who was critically injured. The two trains were carrying a combined total of 200 passengers at the time.

== Aftermath ==
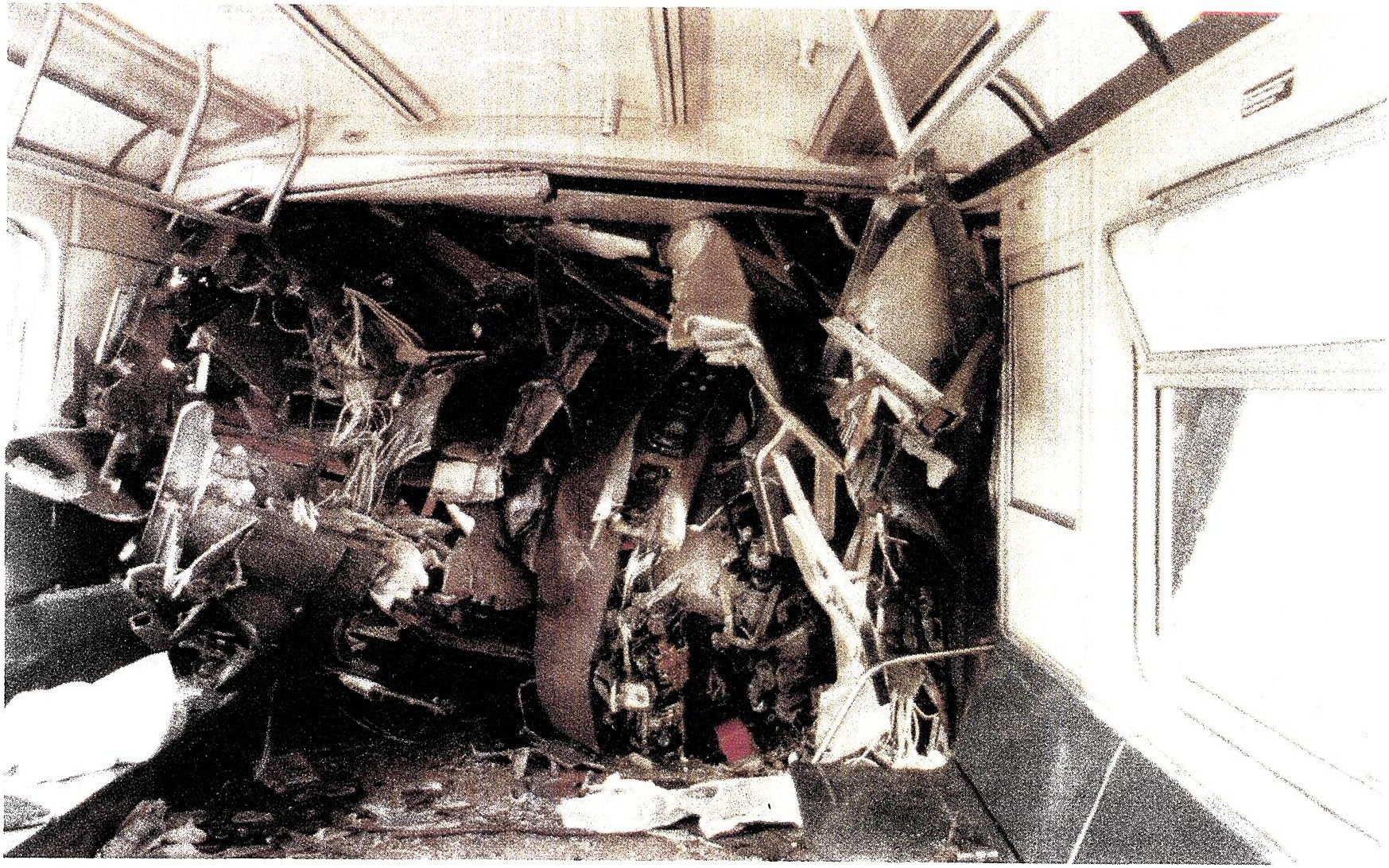
The inside of the train following the crash.

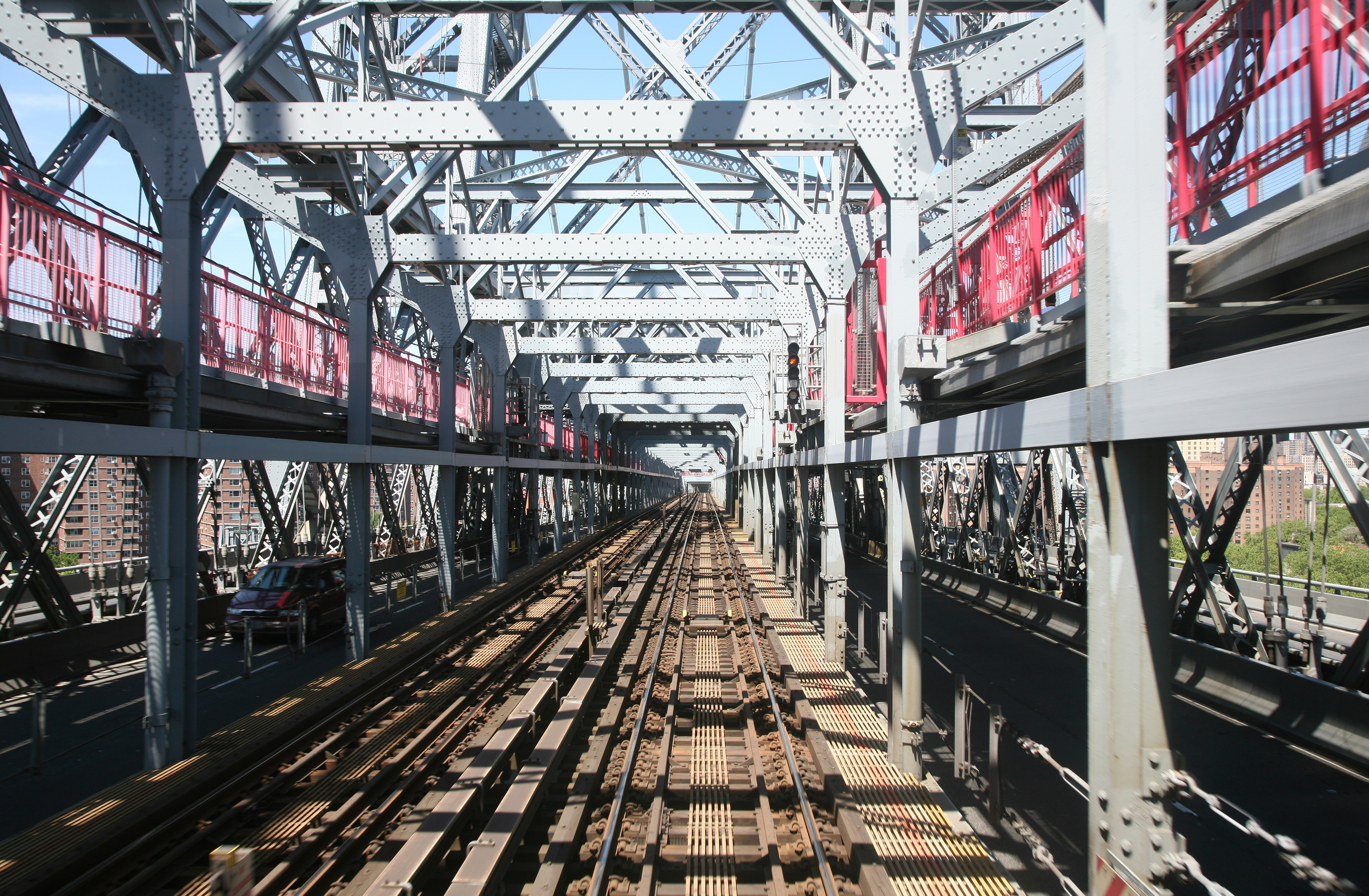
The Williamsburg Bridge subway tracks near where the collision occurred.

The Williamsburg Bridge crash was the fourth major crash in nearly as many years. Immediately afterward, the National Transportation Safety Board (NTSB) announced that it would investigate the incident. The investigation found that the Williamsburg Bridge crash had occurred because Gibson had been fatigued. He had been near the end of an 8-hour overnight shift when the crash occurred. Gibson's blood had tested negative for drugs and alcohol, and the NTSB found that there were no other major distractions at the time, including loud noise from passengers.

Witnesses on the J train stated that the train consist had been braking abruptly, and had narrowly avoided another collision at a track junction at Myrtle Avenue, four stations before the site of the collision. Overall, Gibson was not known as a particularly bad driver: in his 14 years of operating subway trains, he only received three "minor operating violations" for failing to align the train with the platform.

The Williamsburg Bridge tracks used a "fixed block" signaling system, in which signals displayed a red, yellow, or green light depending on whether physical "signal blocks" were occupied by trains. Some of the signals had not been replaced since 1918 and were prone to malfunctions. The NTSB investigation found that, assuming a train had been stopped at the point where the M train had halted prior to the collision, an operator would have been able to see the back of the stopped train at the point where Gibson passed the red signal.

It was quickly determined that Gibson had overrun a signal that was supposed to be red. Normally, running past a red signal would have caused a trackside stop to be raised, thereby causing the train to brake, but this had not happened immediately prior to the crash. Additionally, the train-stopping rods on the J train and on the trackside were supposed to strike each other when the J train passed the red signal, triggering the emergency braking system on the train. However, on the day of the crash, the rods failed to align, and so the emergency brakes on the J train were not engaged.

The New York City Transit Authority (NYCTA), the division of the Metropolitan Transportation Authority (MTA) that operated the subway system, conducted its own investigation and concluded that the Williamsburg Bridge signals were spaced too closely together. A lack of communication between different divisions of the NYCTA was also blamed for the crash since the conditions that caused the crash had been known as early as 1993.

Because of the incident, the MTA modified both track signals and train cars to lower trains' average speeds. Trains' maximum speeds on straight track segments were throttled from 55 miles per hour (89 km/h) to 40 miles per hour (64 km/h), and the MTA installed "grade-time" signals around the system to ensure that a train could only travel under a certain maximum speed before it was allowed to proceed. This modification of signals led to increases in train delays around the system, which in turn was a contributing factor to a transit crisis in 2017-2018.

The front car of the J train, R40A car No. 4461 was repaired into a slant-ended car, however it never re-entered service and was instead donated to the Randall's Island FDNY Facility. The back car of the M train, R42 car No. 4664, was completely destroyed in the collision and scrapped shortly after. The other seven cars in the J train, as well as the next-to-last three cars of the M train, were slightly damaged. The J train consist had been composed exclusively of R40A cars, while the M train consist had contained only R42s. Both car types had similar exterior dimensions, so the MTA paired together the undamaged mates of the destroyed cars, 4460 and 4665. After retirement, this pair was preserved by Railway Preservation Corp. and is now stored at Coney Island Yard after the then-future R160 and R179 orders replaced all R42 and R40 fleet.
