= Maine Trolley Cars =

- U.S. National Register of Historic Places
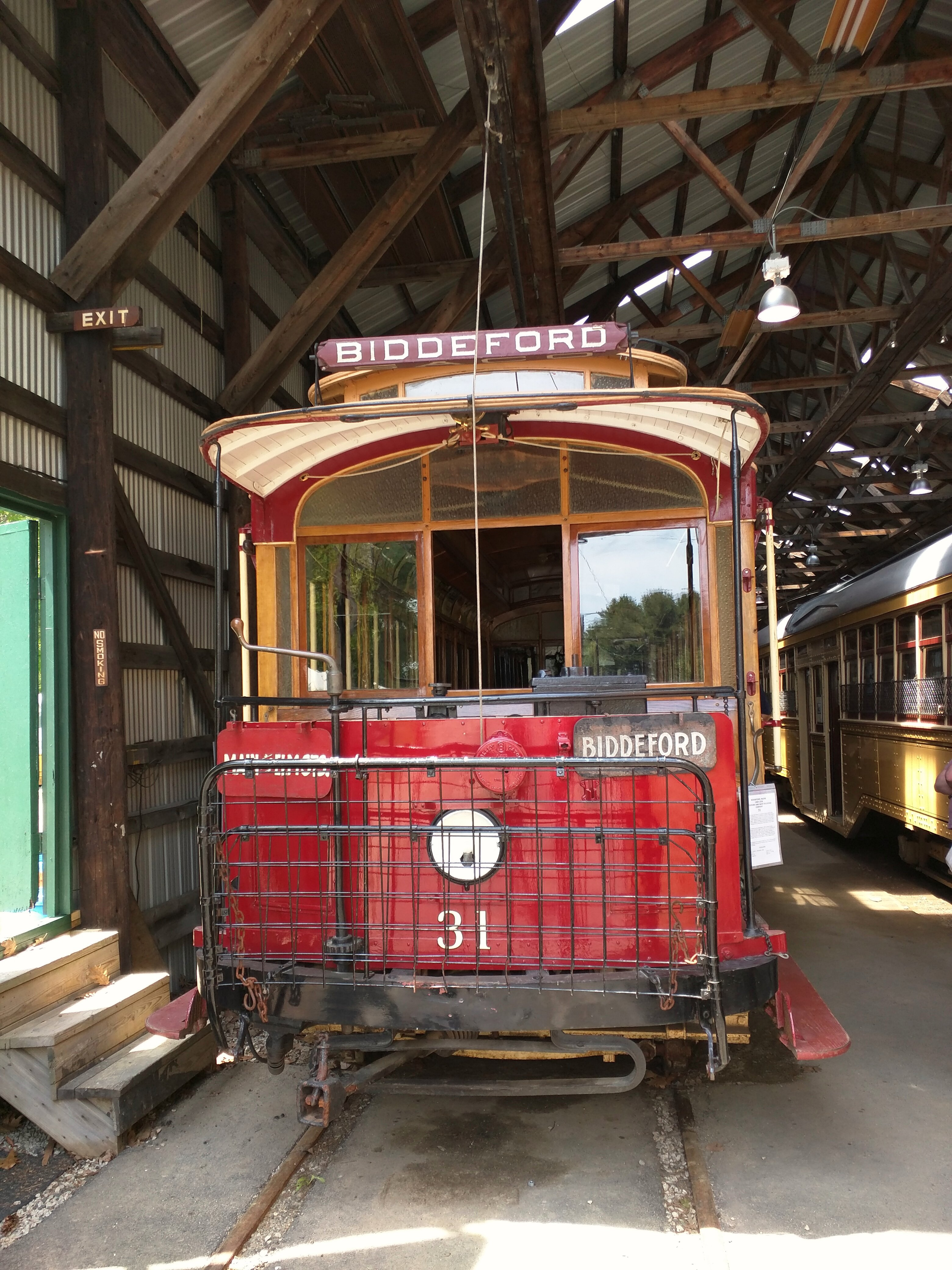
- Biddeford & Saco Railroad car 31, one of six trolley cars in the 10-vehicle listing

- Location within Maine Location within the United States
- Nearest city: Kennebunkport, Maine
- Coordinates: 43°24′33.60″N 70°29′22.78″W
- Built: 1893–1926
- Architect: Multiple
- NRHP reference No.: 80000262
- Added to NRHP: November 14, 1980

The Maine Trolley Cars are a group of 10 rail vehicles, mostly trolley cars, located in Kennebunkport, Maine. The cars were built in various years between 1893 and 1926, and the group was added to the National Register of Historic Places on November 14, 1980. The trolley cars are a small part of the large collection of vehicles at the Seashore Trolley Museum. While the museum's collection of more than 250 vehicles includes ones from several different U.S. states and a few foreign countries, the 10 vehicles in the National Register listing were all operated in the state of Maine at one time.

== Listing ==
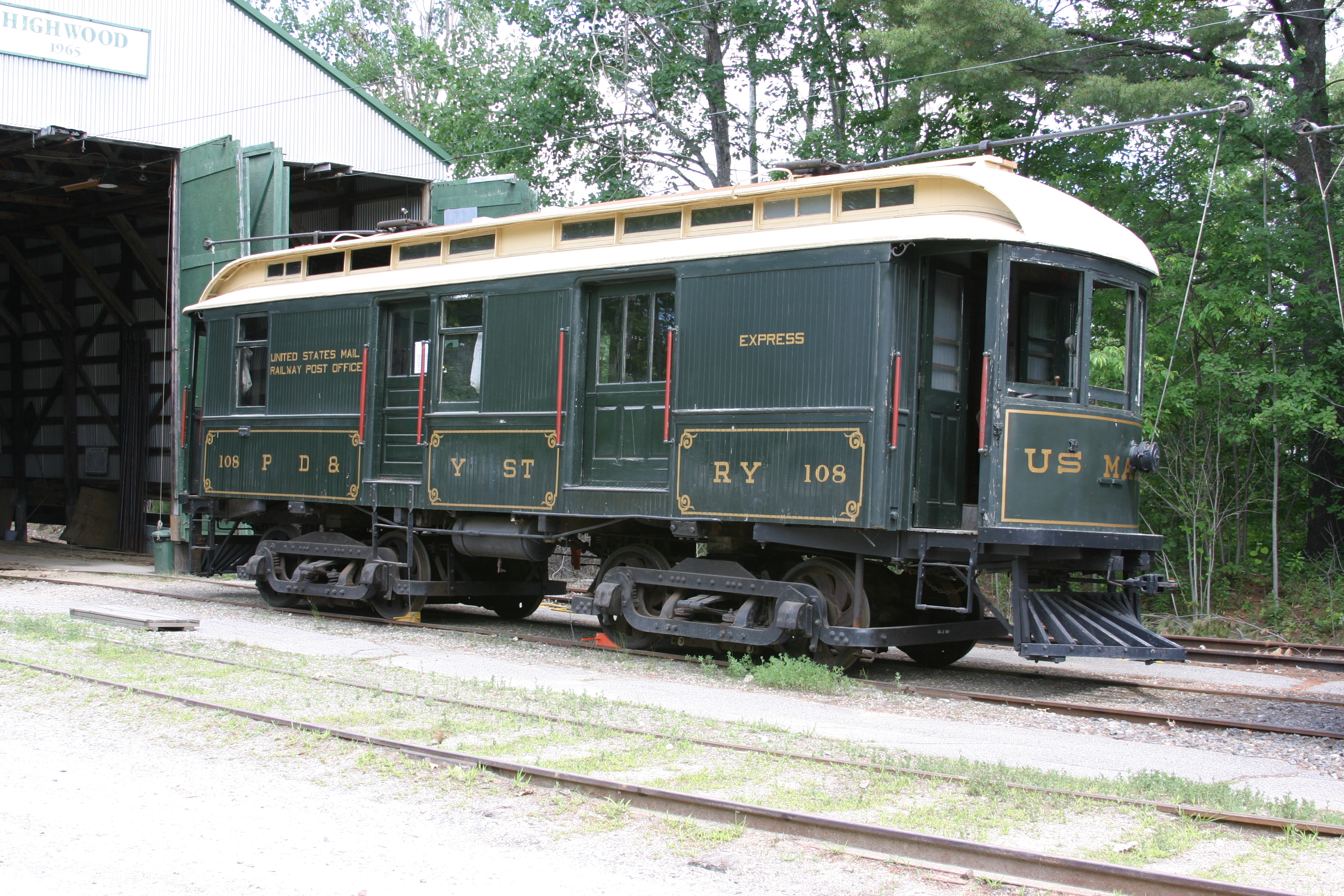
Portsmouth, Dover & York Street Railway car 108, one of four non-passenger vehicles among the 10 in the group

The following vehicles are included in the listing:

- Passenger car #14, Narcissus, of the Portland-Lewiston Interurban
- Baggage/express/mail car #8 of the Mousam River Railroad (unpowered trailer)
- Passenger car #31 of the Biddeford and Saco Railroad
- Locomotive/express car #52 of the Aroostook Valley Railroad
- Passenger car #70 of the Aroostook Valley Railroad
- Passenger car #82 of the York Utilities Company
- Passenger car #88 of the York Utilities Company
- Locomotive #100 of the Atlantic Shore Line Railway
- Railway post office/express car #108 of the Portsmouth, Dover & York Street Railway
- Passenger car #615 of the Portland Railroad Company

== See also ==
- National Register of Historic Places listings in York County, Maine
