= 1–50 series (CTA) =

Class of Chicago Transit Authority cars

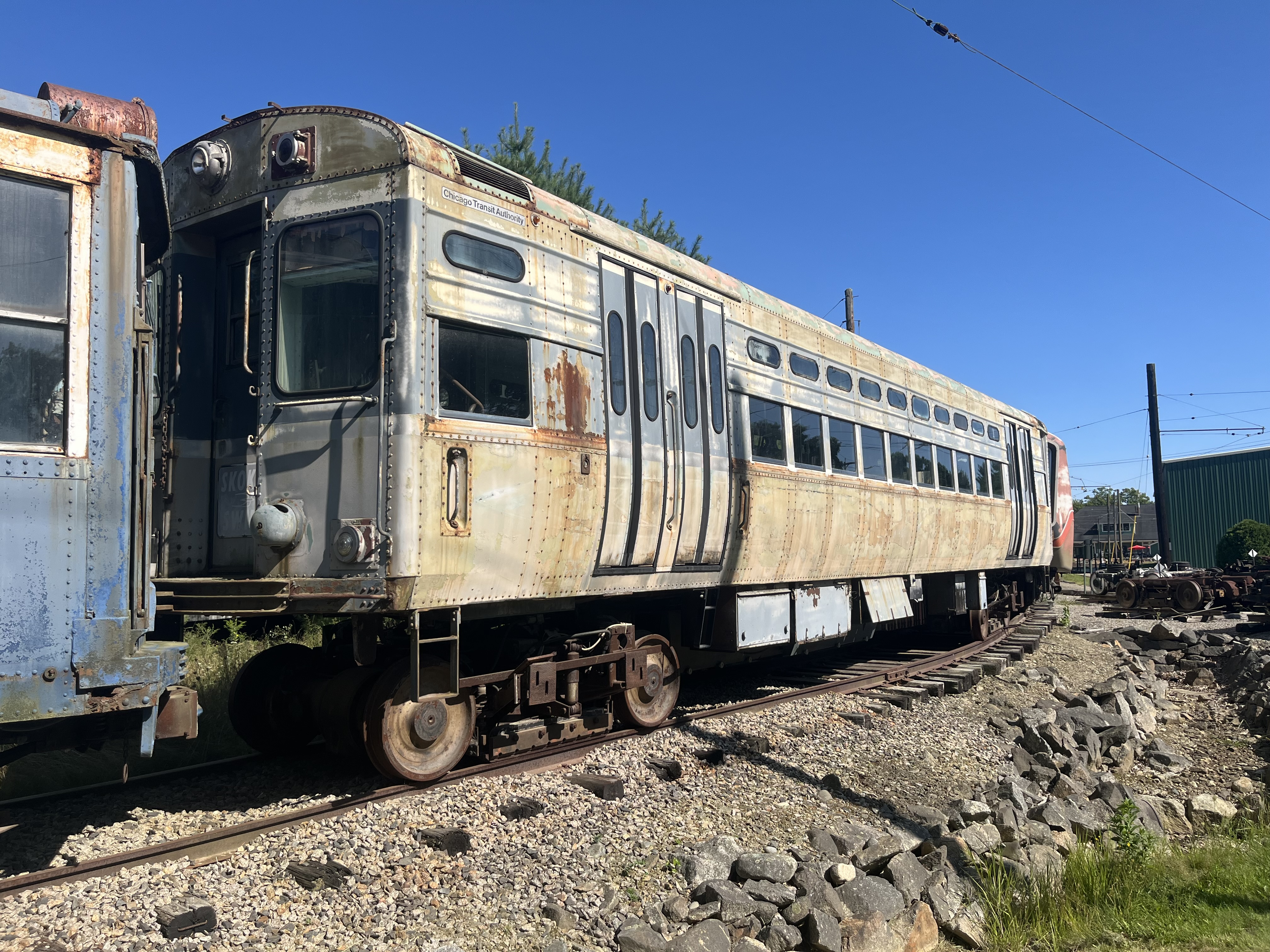
- Car 1 at the Seashore Trolley Museum in August 2024
- In service: April 2, 1961 – March 1998
- Manufacturer: St. Louis Car Company
- Replaced: 1998
- Constructed: 1959–1960
- Entered service: 1961
- Number built: 50
- Successor: 3200-series
- Fleet numbers: 1–50, later some 61–65
- Capacity: 46 seated
- Operator: Chicago Transit Authority
- Lines served: Evanston, Skokie Swift, Ravenswood, West-Northwest

Specifications
- Car length: 48 feet (14.63 m)
- Width: 9 feet 4 inches (2.84 m)
- Height: 11 feet 10 inches (3.61 m)
- Entry: Level
- Doors: 4 (2 per side)
- Maximum speed: 50 mph (80 km/h) (1-4: 70 mph (110 km/h))
- Weight: 49,825 pounds (22,600 kg)
- Traction motors: 4 × GE 1220F1 55 hp (41 kW) DC motor (except 1-4, various)
- Power output: 220 hp (160 kW) total
- Electric systems: Overhead line or third rail, 600 V DC
- Current collection: Contact shoe or trolley pole
- Braking systems: Dynamic and friction
- Track gauge: 4 ft 8 1/2 in (1,435 mm) standard gauge

The 1–50 series was a series of Chicago "L" cars built by the St. Louis Car Company in 1959 and 1960. Unlike cars in the similar 6000 series, which were designed for married pair operation, the 1–50 series cars were double-ended to facilitate single car operation. There was a limited need for single cars, however, so cars 5, 7, 9, 11, 15, 19, 21, 23, 24, and 31 were later rebuilt as married units and were renumbered 61a/b–65a/b.

== Equipment ==
Forty-six cars in the series were constructed with components salvaged from Presidents' Conference Committee (PCC) streetcars which the Chicago Transit Authority (CTA) no longer needed. The majority of the 6000 series also used salvaged components.

The streetcar version of the PCC trucks had 26 in (660 mm) resilient wheels, instead of the 28 in (711 mm) solid wheels intended for rapid transit use, and restricted speed to 50 mph (80 km/h). The slower speed was adequate for most CTA needs. Replacement wheels were solid, but remained at 26 in (660 mm).

Cars 1–4 had high-speed test equipment and 28 in (711 mm) wheels. In 1964 they were modified with a locally designed “pan trolley” for the overhead wires on the high speed Skokie Swift shuttle. Later, cars 23–26 and 29–30 would also have pan trolleys, and 29–30 were also retrofitted with 28 in (711 mm) solid wheels for increased speed.

Cars 27–28 and 39–50 had trolley poles for use on the Evanston line. The line was converted to third rail in 1973, and most trolley equipment was removed.

== Routes ==
The Skokie equipped cars, with their pan trolleys, were too high to operate anywhere else on the system. Up to eight cars were used on this route.

The Evanston equipped cars, with their smaller trolley poles, operated into the loop. Up to sixteen cars were used on this route.

The remaining cars were used on the Ravenswood then West-Northwest routes. They were usually used as two car sets trained with 6000 series cars.

== Preservation ==
A lot of 1–50, and all of the 61–65 cars were scrapped by the CTA and various other scrap companies. Fortunately, a handful of 1–50 cars survive today in a number of museums in the United States, as well as one in Canada.

Surviving cars include:

1, the first car in the series, is at the Seashore Trolley Museum in Kennebunkport, Maine.

22, 30 and 41 are at the Illinois Railway Museum in Union, Illinois.

40, 43 and 45 are at the Fox River Trolley Museum in South Elgin, Illinois.

44, is at the National Museum of Transportation in St. Louis, Missouri.

48, is at the Halton County Radial Railway Museum in Ontario, Canada.

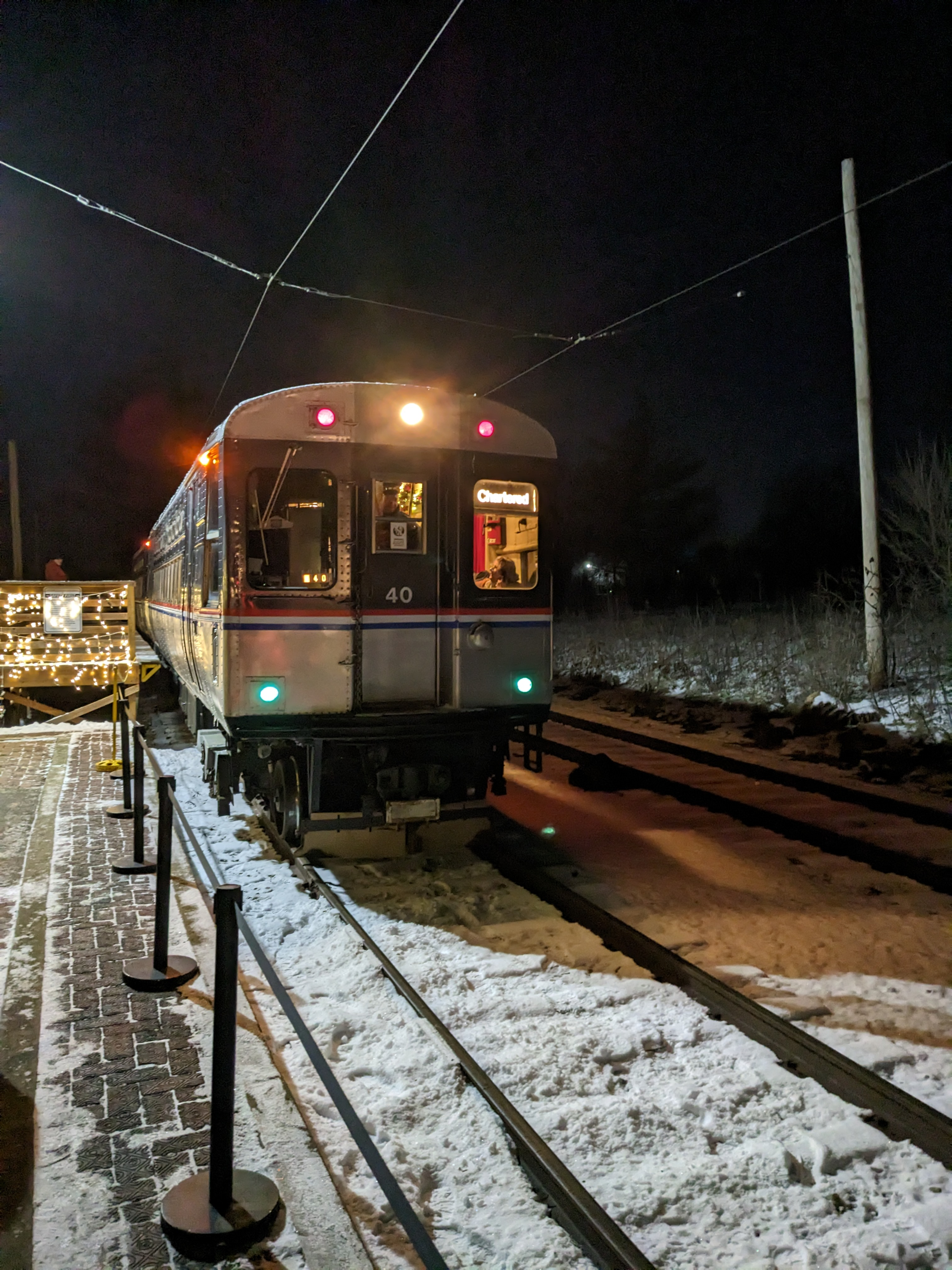
Car 40 at the Fox River Trolley Museum

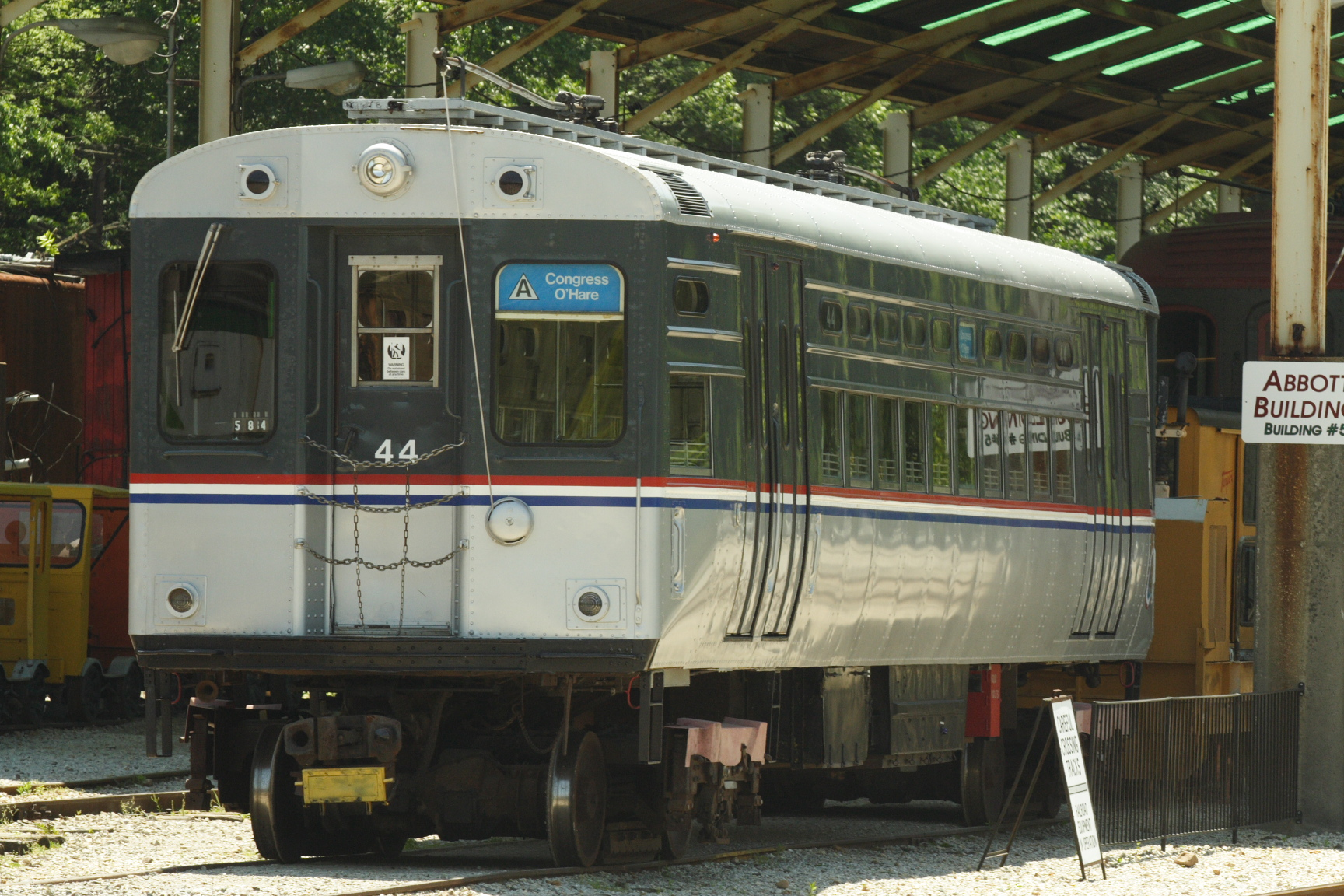
Car 44 at the St. Louis Museum of Transportation

== See also ==
- Chicago "L"
- 5000 series Chicago "L" cars
- PCC streetcar

== Bibliography ==
- C.E.R.A. (1976). Chicago's Rapid Transit v.2: Rolling Stock/1947–1976. Central Electric Railfans’ Association. ISBN 0-915348-15-2.
