= State-of-the-Art Car =

Prototype rapid transit railway vehicle

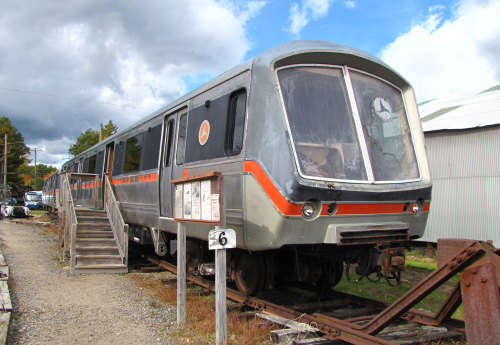
- State-of-the-Art Cars displayed at Seashore Trolley Museum in 2010
- Manufacturer: St. Louis Car Company
- Constructed: 1972
- Entered service: 1974
- Number built: 2 (married pair)
- Number preserved: 2
- Capacity: 62 to 72 seated passengers 220 to 300 total passengers

Specifications
- Car length: 74 ft 8 1/2 in (22.77 m)
- Width: 9 ft 9 in (2.97 m)
- Height: 11 ft 8 1/2 in (3.57 m) to 12 ft 1 1/2 in (3.70 m)
- Platform height: 3 ft 5 1/2 in (1.05 m) to 3 ft 10 1/2 in (1.18 m)
- Doors: 4 per side
- Wheel diameter: 30 in (762 mm)
- Wheelbase: 54 ft (16.5 m)
- Maximum speed: 80 mph (130 km/h)
- Weight: 90,000 lb (41,000 kg)
- Traction system: Chopper control
- Electric system: 600 V DC
- Current collection: Third rail contact shoe or pantograph
- Minimum turning radius: 145 ft (44 m)
- Track gauge: 4 ft 8 1/2 in (1,435 mm) standard gauge

Notes/references
- Specifications from unless noted

The State-of-the-Art Car (SOAC) was a heavy rail mass transit demonstrator vehicle produced for the United States Department of Transportation's Urban Mass Transportation Administration in the 1970s. It was intended to demonstrate the latest technologies to operating agencies and the riding public, and serve to promote existing and proposed transit lines. A single married pair was produced by the St. Louis Car Company in 1972. It operated in intermittent revenue service on six rapid transit systems in five United States cities between May 1974 and January 1977. Since 1989, the two cars have been on display at the Seashore Trolley Museum in Kennebunkport, Maine.

== Design and development ==
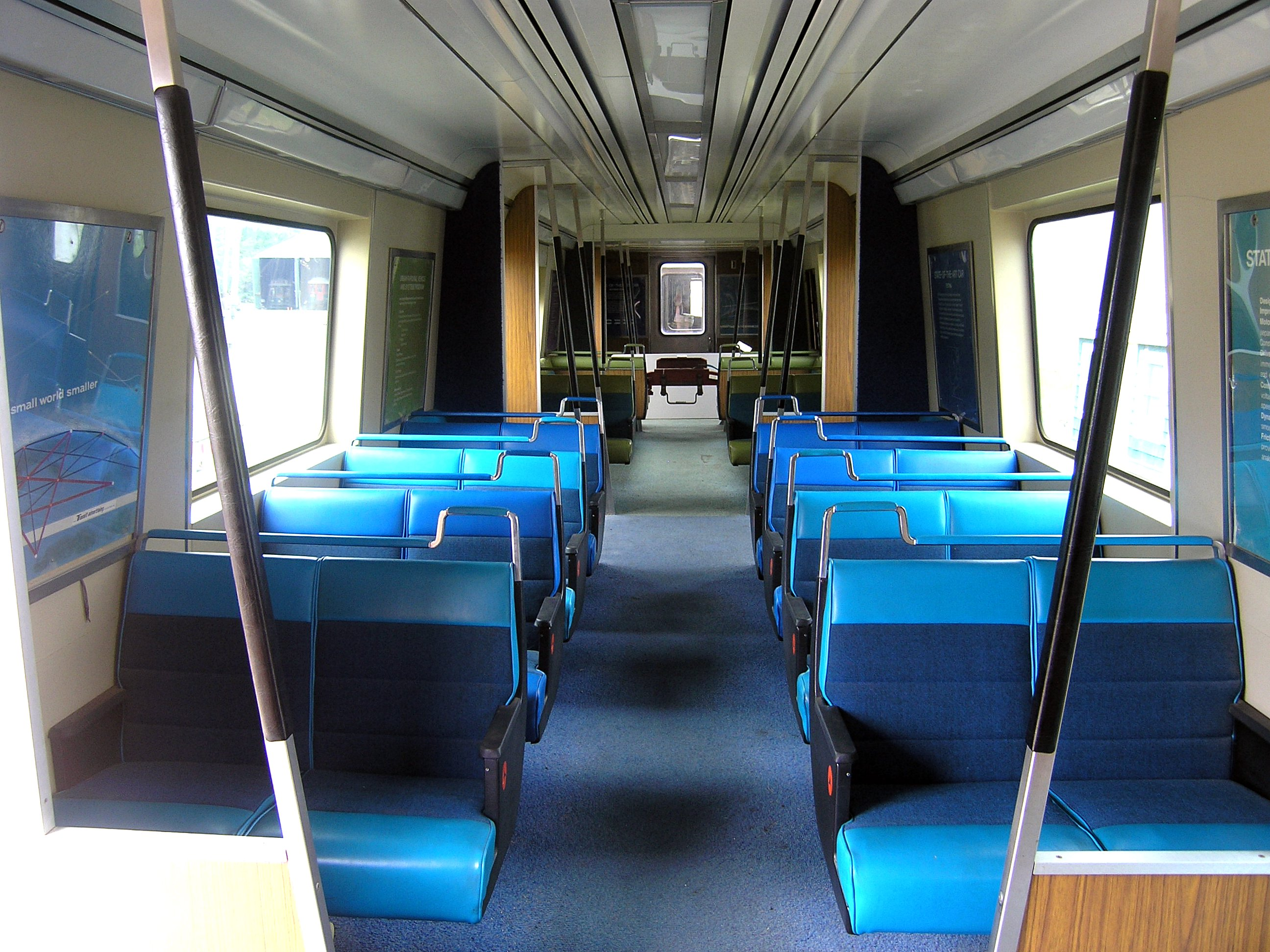
"Lo-Density" seating in a demonstrator car

Around 1970, the United States Department of Transportation's Urban Mass Transportation Administration (UMTA) began the Urban Rapid Rail Vehicle and Systems Program with the intention of creating a new rapid transit vehicle for use on existing and proposed systems. The new cars were to represent the state of the art in transit vehicle technology; priority was placed on making them comfortable, safe, reliable, and quiet to attract passengers. Boeing Vertol was selected in 1971 to manage the State-of-the-Art Car (SOAC) project.

The Budd Company, Pullman-Standard, Rohr Industries, the St. Louis Car Company, and Vought bid for a contract to produce a two-car demonstrator set, which was won by the St. Louis Car Company. The design was based on the R44 subway car, which the company had recently produced for the New York City Subway, with influences from recently produced BART rolling stock. The two SOAC demonstrator cars were completed in 1972; along with the R44, they were the last rolling stock produced by the company. The SOAC cars cost $350,000 each, compared to $300,000 each for the R44.

The SOAC was built to meet the loading gauge of existing rapid transit systems in Boston, Chicago, Cleveland, New York City, and Philadelphia. It was restricted to certain lines, including the B Division in New York City and the Skokie Swift in Chicago because other parts of those systems had smaller loading gauges. The SOAC was built to dimensions nearly identical to the R44: 74 ft 8 1/2 in (22.77 m) long and 9 ft 9 in (2.97 m) wide. Floor height could be adjusted to match platform heights of each system, with the cars 11 ft 8 1/2 in (3.57 m) to 12 ft 1 1/2 in (3.70 m) high, depending on the configuration.

The two demonstrator cars were built with two different configurations: "Lo-Density" with a total capacity of 220 passengers per car, and "Hi-Density" with a 300-passenger capacity. The "Hi-Density" car had a mixture of transverse and longitudinal seating, with a total of 72 seats. The "Lo-Density" car had 62 seats in three sections: one with only transverse seats, one with a mix of seat types, and one with a mix of seat types and two tables. Both demonstrator cars were "A" cars with a cab at one end. The SOAC used third rail power in most locations, but power was collected from overhead lines in Chicago and Cleveland.

== Testing ==
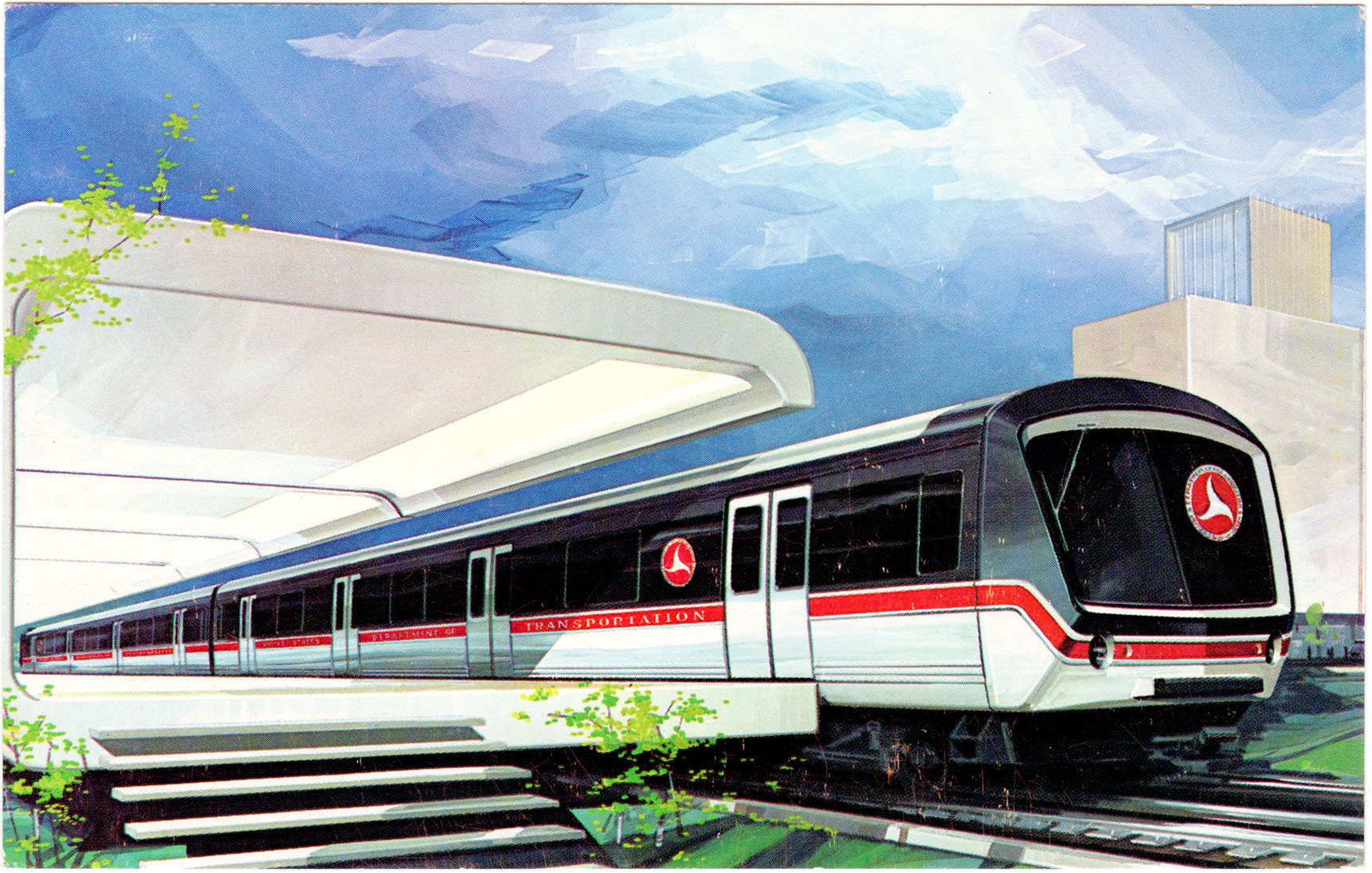
A publicity postcard of the SOAC

The SOAC was first tested at the High Speed Ground Test Center in Pueblo, Colorado. On August 11, 1973, the test train collided with a freight car due to a mis-set switch, killing the operator. The collision focused additional attention on the safety of the SOAC design.

After the initial testing, the SOAC set toured six rapid transit systems in five American cities for additional testing and public rides. (Two other rapid transit systems were excluded: then-newly opened BART used 5 ft 6 in (1,676 mm) broad gauge tracks, while PATH had a small loading gauge that allowed only 51-foot (15.54 m)-long, 2.8-meter (9 ft 2 1/4 in)-wide cars.)

Revenue service began on the New York City Subway on May 17, 1974; the SOAC ran on the A, D, E, and N services until July 19. It was then operated in revenue service on the MBTA Red Line in Boston for a month beginning on August 19, 1974. The SOAC demonstrator was then tested on the CTS Airport Line later in 1974, with fifteen days of revenue service.

The SOAC next operated on the CTA Skokie Swift line for thirteen days of revenue service in January 1975. The cars were slightly wider and substantially longer than other CTA rolling stock; the platforms at the two Skokie Swift stations were modified with retractable edges. The next stop was Philadelphia, where the SOAC operated on revenue service on the SEPTA Broad Street Line from March 6 to April 2, 1975. Over this initial testing program, the SOAC operated 19,595 miles (31,535 km) over 104 days, carrying an estimated 312,000 passengers. After the completion of the original testing program, the SOAC was transferred to the PATCO Speedline for additional service, with non-revenue tests taking place on May 1, 1975. After vehicle modifications and insurance negotiations, a planned nine months of revenue service began on August 12, 1976. By the time operations ceased on January 24, 1977, the cars had only operated in revenue service for 23 days.

The SOAC was well received by the public, particularly due to the quiet operation and air conditioning, as well as by the train operators, who found it easy to control. The operating agencies had more mixed reactions; only some found it useful. After the SOAC and the mixed results of the US Standard Light Rail Vehicle program, UMTA did not pursue further vehicle designs, but instead focused on subsystem research. A number of design elements from the SOAC – including acoustic design, air-ride suspension, chopper propulsion controls, and traction motor ventilation – were incorporated on future rolling stock designs by numerous agencies.

The SOAC cars were stored at Boeing Vertol until May 1979, when one was shipped to the Budd Company and one to Pueblo, where they were used for additional subsystem testing. The two-car demonstrator was acquired by the Seashore Trolley Museum in Kennebunkport, Maine as a static display in 1989 and has remained there since.

== See also ==
- Intermediate Capacity Transit System
