= R44 (New York City Subway car) =

Class of New York City Subway car

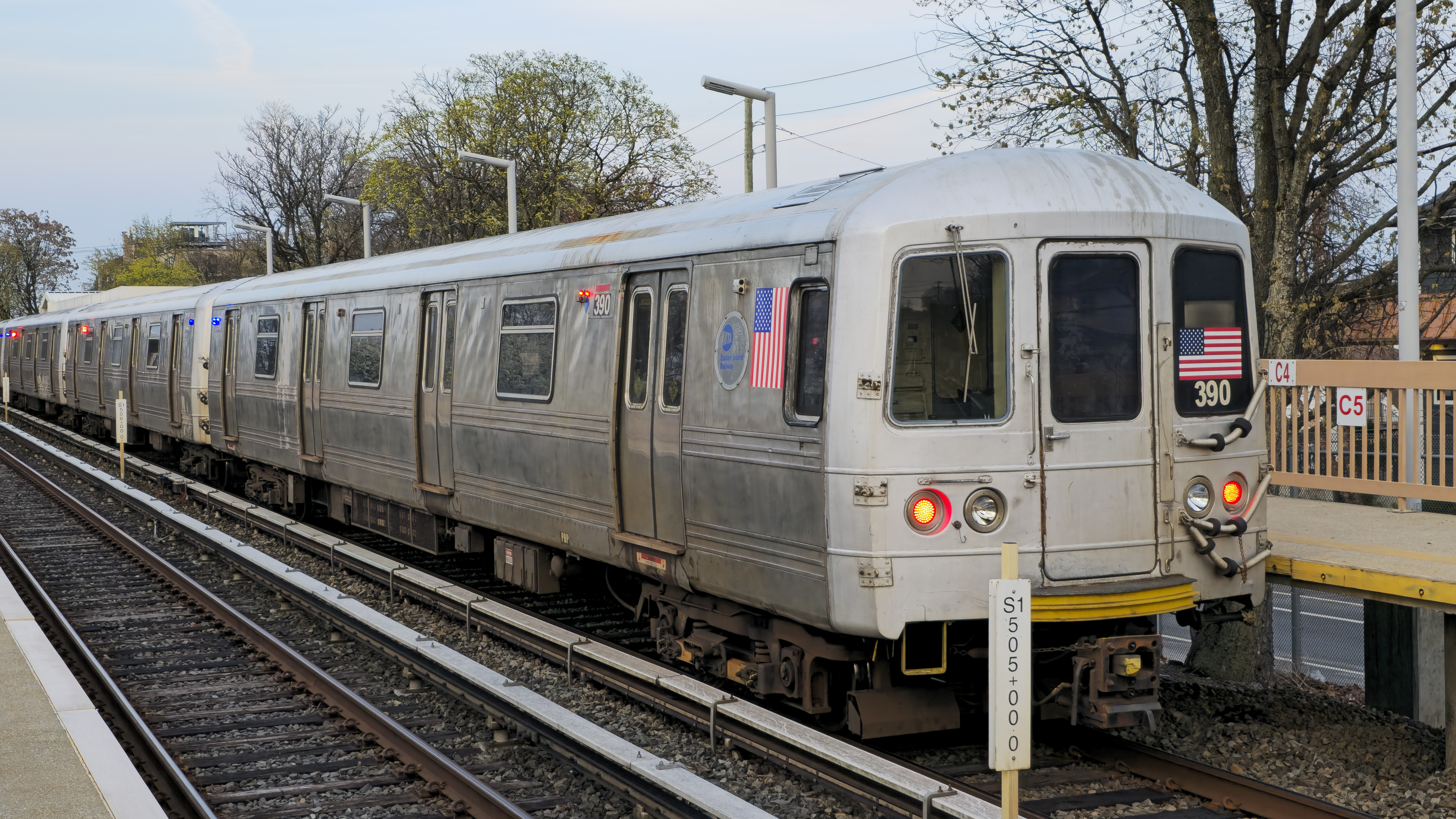
- An R44S train on the Staten Island Railway (SIR) at Jefferson Av

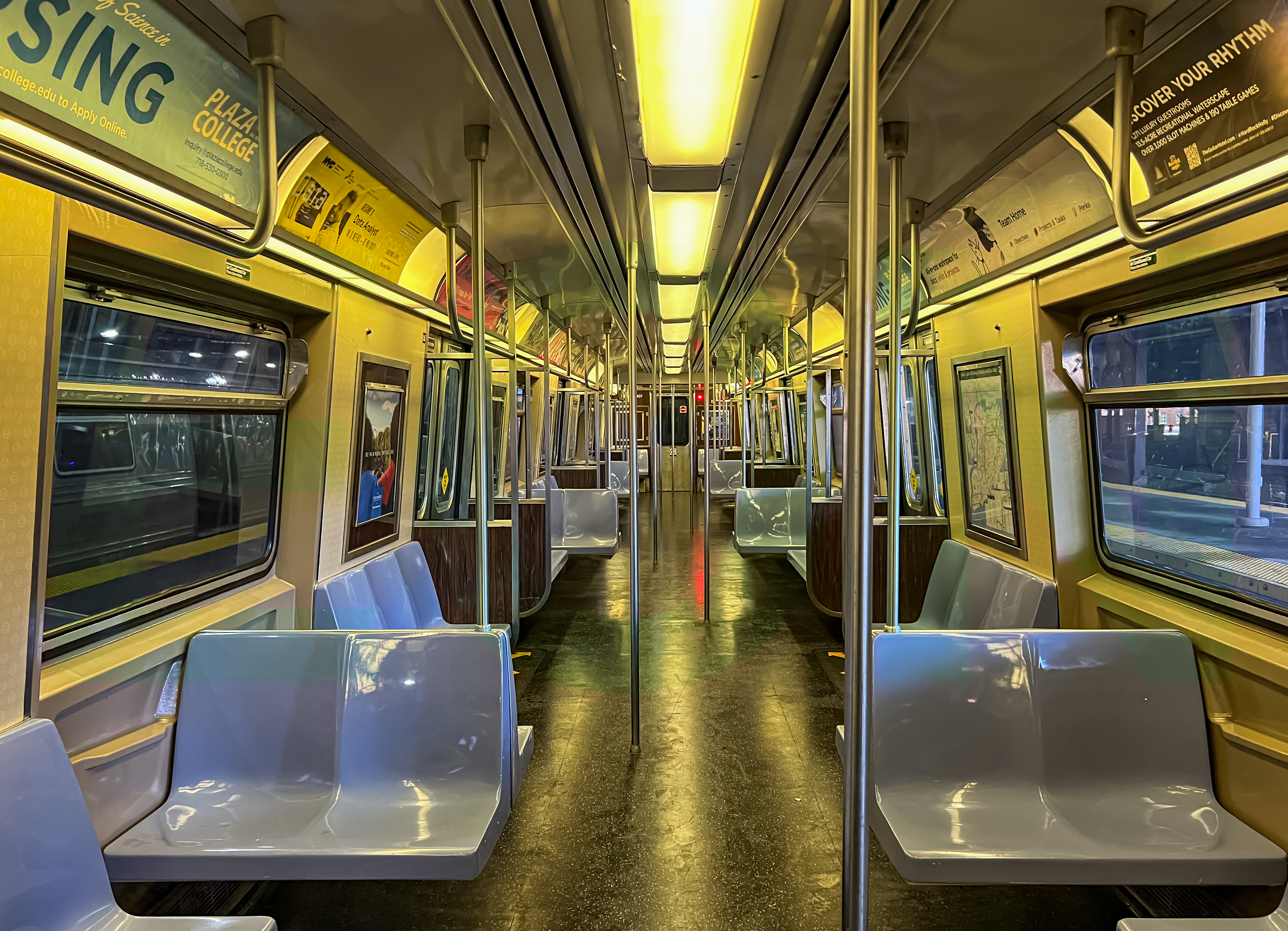
- Interior of a SIR R44 car
- In service: December 16, 1971 – September 16, 2010 (NYC cars); February 28, 1973 – present (SIR cars)
- Manufacturer: St. Louis Car Company
- Built at: St. Louis, Missouri, USA
- Replaced: Many R1–9s; All 1925 Standard Steel built SIRTOA ME-1 train cars
- Constructed: 1971–1973
- Entered service: December 16, 1971 (NYCT cars (revenue 54 years old service testing)); April 19, 1972 (NYCT cars (official service)); February 28, 1973 (SIR cars)
- Refurbished: March 1990 – January 1993 (all cars), 2007 – 2010 (SIR cars)
- Scrapped: 2012–2013 (NYCT cars & one damaged SIR car), 2024–present (remaining SIR cars)
- Number built: 352
- Number in service: 32 (contingency fleet only)
- Number preserved: 1
- Number scrapped: 296
- Successor: R160 (NYCT); R211S (SIR)
- Formation: Single units (SIR), 4 car sets (NYCT)
- Fleet numbers: 5202–5479 (NYC Subway); 388–435, 436–466 (even) (SIRTOA) (cars originally numbered 100–435, 436–466 (even))
- Capacity: A car: 72 (seated); B car: 76 (seated)
- Operators: New York City Subway (1971–2010); Staten Island Railway (1973–present)

Specifications
- Car body construction: Stainless steel with carbon steel chassis and underbody, with fiberglass end bonnets
- Car length: 74 ft 8.5 in (22.77 m) (over anticlimbers)
- Width: 10 ft (3,048 mm) (over threshold)
- Height: 12.08 ft (3,682 mm)
- Platform height: 3.76 ft (1.15 m)
- Doors: 8 sets of 50-inch-wide side doors per car (4 per side)
- Maximum speed: Test: 87.75 mph (141.22 km/h); Service: 55 mph (89 km/h)–60 mph (97 km/h)
- Weight: A train car: 88,950 lb (40,347 kg); B train car: 84,530 lb (38,342 kg)
- Traction system: NYC Subway: Westinghouse E-CAM XCA448F propulsion with Westinghouse 1447F motors 115 hp (85.8 kW) on all axles Staten Island Railway: General Electric SCM-CAM 17KG192A1 propulsion with GE 1257E1 motors 115 hp (85.8 kW) on all axles
- Prime mover: electric motor
- Acceleration: 2.5 mph/s (4.0 km/(h⋅s))
- Deceleration: 3.0 mph/s (4.8 km/(h⋅s)) (Full Service); 3.2 mph/s (5.1 km/(h⋅s)) (Emergency)
- Electric systems: Third rail, 625 V DC
- Current collection: Contact shoe
- Braking systems: NYC Subway: Westcode (dynamic and friction), WABCO tread brake unit Staten Island Railway: WABCO RT5C (dynamic and friction), WABCO tread brake unit
- Safety systems: ATO, dead man's switch, pulse code cab signaling, tripcock
- Headlight type: halogen light bulbs
- Track gauge: 4 ft 8 1/2 in (1,435 mm) standard gauge

The R44 is a New York City Subway car model built by the St. Louis Car Company from 1971 to 1973 for the B Division and the Staten Island Railway (SIR). The cars replaced many R1–9 series cars, and all remaining 1925 Standard Steel built SIRTOA ME-1 trains, providing Staten Island with a new fleet of railcars. The R44 fleet initially consisted of 352 cars; the remaining ones operate on the Staten Island Railway.

The first R44 cars entered service on the subway on April 19, 1972, and on the Staten Island Railway on February 28, 1973. Various modifications were made over the years to the R44 fleet. The R44s set the world speed record for a subway car in 1972, reaching a top speed of 87.75 mph (141.22 km/h). In the early 1990s, the R44 cars were rebuilt by Morrison–Knudsen and New York City Transit Authority. Though New York City Subway-operated R44s were replaced by the R160 between December 18, 2009 and September 16, 2010, due to structural integrity issues, the Staten Island Railway fleet remained in active operation until September 2025, when they were replaced by the R211S. The R44 cars are planned to remain in reserve as supplemental rolling stock for several years before their full retirement.

== Description ==
A total of 352 R44 cars were ordered; 300 cars for the New York City Subway (numbered 100–399, with 278 of the cars later renumbered 5202–5479). These cars were known as R44ML cars. 52 more cars were ordered for the Staten Island Railway (also known as ME-2, MU-2, or MUE-2 cars, numbered 400–435 and even numbers between 436 and 466). They were the last subway cars built by the St. Louis Car Company prior to shutting down in 1974.

The R44s originally came in singles, but needed each other to run, much like the "married pairs" of subway cars before them (R26 to R42, except R33S). The NYCT cars were reassembled after overhaul into ABBA sets of four; A cars are evenly numbered with a full-width operator cabs at the number 1 end, while the B cars have odd numbers and no cabs at either end. The SIR cars were not reassembled after overhaul and remain as single units.

The R44s were also factory equipped with automatic train operation (ATO) equipment, in anticipation of their use on the new Second Avenue Subway Line that was being built at the time.

Since September 16, 2010, all NYCT R44 cars have been retired and replaced by the R160s due to structural integrity issues found on those cars, leaving the SIR as the sole operator of the R44. The R44 cars in service on SIR are maintained at Clifton Yard, with heavier maintenance being performed at Coney Island Yard.

=== Firsts ===
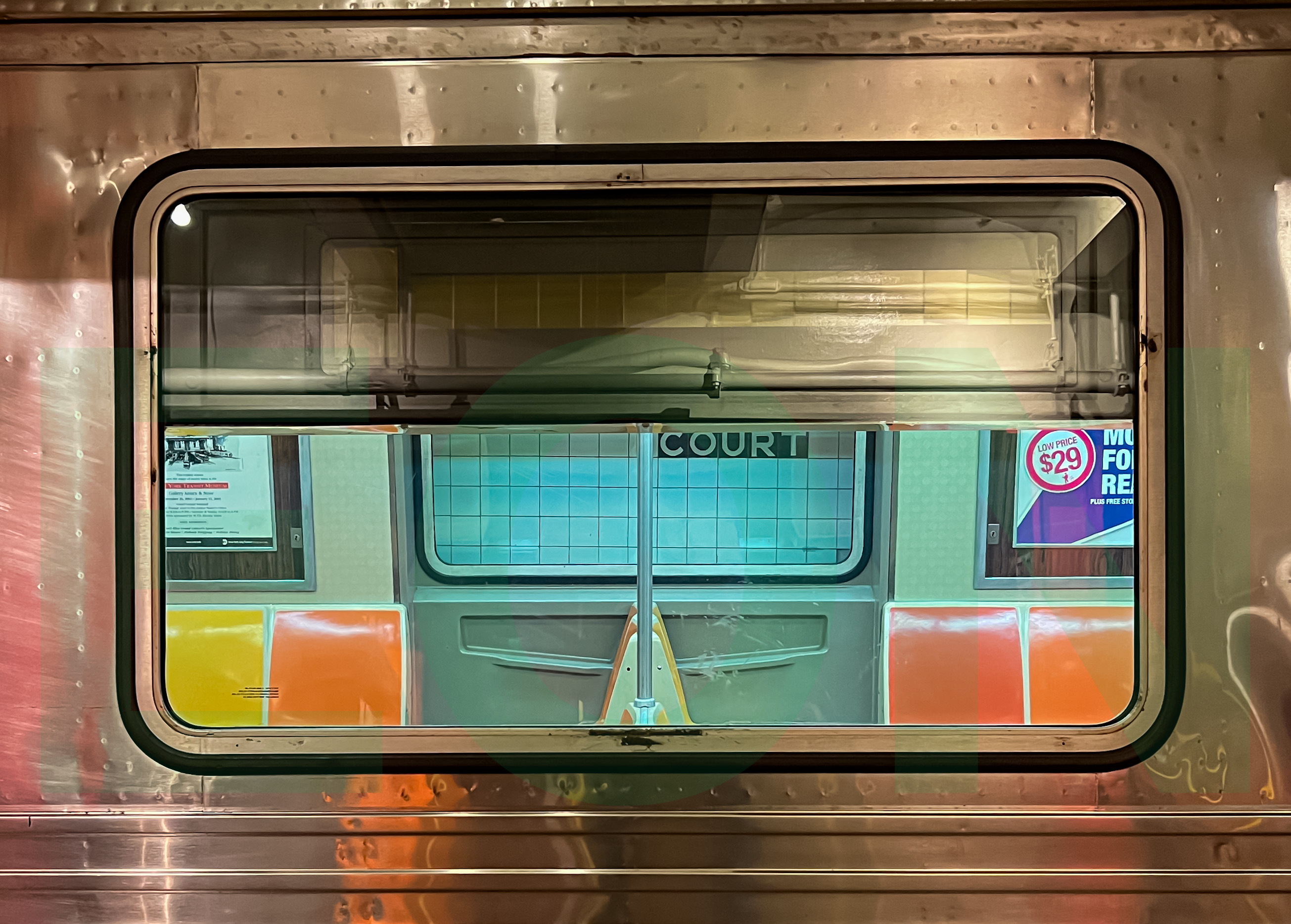
During the overhaul of the R44MLs, they received LCD signs that displayed the destination and line. These replaced the old rollsigns that were in the same spot

The R44 was the first 75-foot (23 m) car for the New York City Subway. The cars were introduced under the idea that a train of eight 75-foot (22.86 m) cars would be more efficient than one of ten 60-foot (18.29 m) cars. Despite the increase in length, the R44s had eight pairs of doors per car (four on each side) like previous B Division cars. As a result, eight 75-foot (22.86 m) cars have only 64 (32 per side) pairs, whereas ten cars have 80 (40 per side).

The interior design was very different from previous models. The R44s had orange and yellow plastic bucket seats—a feature that would be incorporated into the other 75-foot (22.86 m) B-division cars and the A-division R62s and R62As. The seats were protected from the doorways by faux wood and glass panels. They were also the first car class delivered with crosswise seating since the R16 order from 1954. The walls were tan with "wallpaper" featuring the seals of New York State and New York City made from graffiti-resistant Formica plastics. The new interior decor was carried over to the R46 fleet.

The R44 was the first car since the BMT Green Hornet to incorporate a two-note warning tone that sounds before the doors begin to close as the train prepares to leave the station. When the cars were built, the chime was sounded four seconds before the doors closed, but the time delay was later removed. This has become the signature sound of the subway and is used with all subsequent cars.

The R44s were also the first NYCT subway cars to feature a newly designed WABCO-RT5 electronically and pneumatically controlled braking system also known as the P-Wire system, which did not fare well with this fleet of cars (similar systems also plagued the R46s), since most of the shop personnel were not adequately trained to deal with the P-Wire braking system's sophisticated fail/safe design for automatic train operation. The system would sometimes trigger the train's emergency braking system unexpectedly, which caused a situation known as stuck brakes. This P-Wire system, along with all of the automation systems (ATO) installed when these cars were built, was removed from the R44s beginning in 1984, and was replaced by a more conventional Westcode SMEE type braking system which made these cars much more reliable than with the originally installed system. The SIR cars had the same system, but fared much better than the NYCT cars.

The rollsigns from eight R44s were removed and replaced by experimental flip-dot signs starting in 1988, the same year the New Technology Program began. These experimental flip-dots signs were replaced by electronic LCD signs on the sides and rollsigns on the front during the General Overhaul Program from 1991 to 1993.

The R44s were designed to be automated and had a high design top speed of 70 mph (110 km/h) in anticipation of operation on new subway lines to be built, such as the Second Avenue Subway, which never opened while the cars were in subway service. On January 31, 1972, the R44s set the world speed record for a subway car, when a consist reached a speed of 87.75 mph (141.22 km/h) on the Long Island Rail Road's main line between Woodside and Jamaica. With two motors per car disabled, the cars still reached 77 mph (124 km/h). The cars were capable of attaining even higher speeds, but the length of the test track was insufficient to allow further acceleration.

== History ==
=== Pre-introduction ===
To ensure the subway could accommodate 75-foot (22.86 m) cars, three retired R1 cars (numbered 165, 192, and 211; renumbered XC675, XC575, and XC775 respectively) were repurposed and sent to various places around the subway and the Staten Island Railway. Cars XC675 and XC575 were cut in half and lengthened to 75 feet (22.86 m).

As a result of the tests, it was determined that only minor changes to tunnels were needed to fit the 75-foot cars, and that particular segments on the BMT Eastern Division (the J/Z, L, and M) would be too difficult to convert to allow 75-foot (22.86 m) cars to operate safely. As such, the R44s were not delivered to those lines.

At the end of 1969, bids were received and a contract was awarded for an order of 240 75-foot R44 subway cars, with an option for 60 additional cars at the end of 1969.

=== Delivery and early mishaps ===
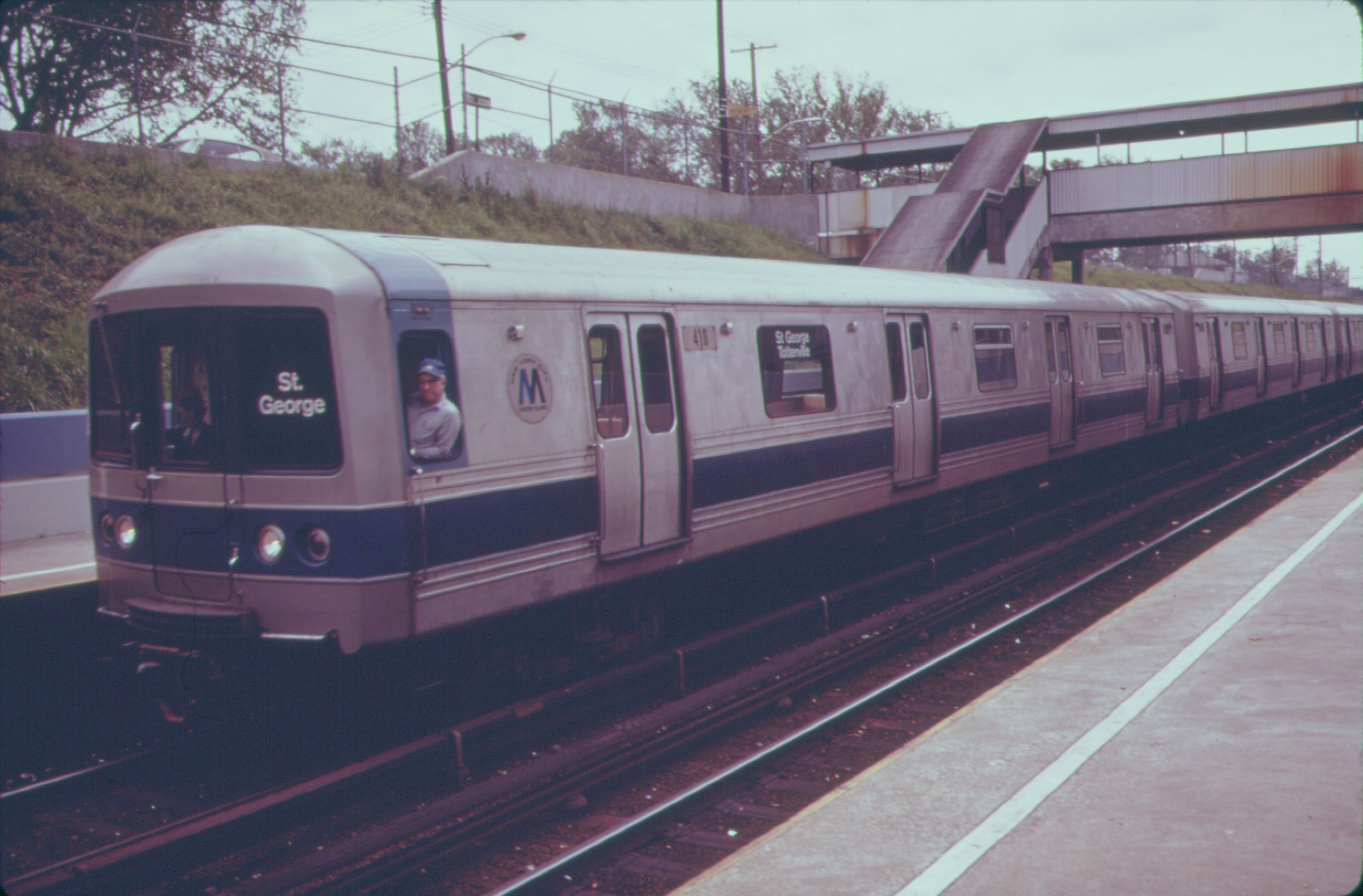
An SIR R44 train on the Staten Island Railway, prior to the GOH program

After many months of exhaustive testing on the A, D, E, and F (one week on each service, starting December 16, 1971), as well as on the LIRR to test the cars' state-of-the-art electrical and mechanical systems, the first set of R44s was placed in service on the New York City Subway on the F on April 19, 1972, following a brief introductory ceremony attended by the Mayor of New York City John V. Lindsay, along with MTA Chairman William J. Ronan at Jamaica–179th Street station. The Staten Island R44s were delivered between January and April 1973. The first six Staten Island R44s went into service on February 28, 1973. With the completion of the R44 order and the similar State-of-the-Art Car, the St. Louis Car Company shut down operations.

An eight-car train (328–335) was tested in 1973 with carpeting, and another (380–387) was tested with hydraulic brakes that were incompatible with the rest of the R44s' braking systems. In 1979, seven of the eight cars had these systems removed and replaced with conventional air brakes, while the last car (car 385) was permanently removed from service.

Cars 388–399 were not converted to Westcode SMEE braking system in 1984, and were sent to the Staten Island Railway in 1985 to provide SIRTOA with some extra cars. This allowed SIRTOA to address significantly increased ridership and to ensure their existing 52-car fleet would not be overly taxed.

In 1983, organizations for the blind stated that the gaps in between R44 and R46 cars were dangerous, since blind passengers could not discern the space between subway cars and open car doors. "Baloney" coil spring-type intercar safety barriers were installed on all cars of both fleets by the end of 1984.

Nine NYCT R44s were involved in various listed incidents that led to their premature retirements before the General Overhaul Program (GOH) program for the R44s commenced. These cars, along with car 385, were not overhauled during the GOH program; they were instead stored on the system and stripped of parts until March 2001, when they were shipped off property and scrapped.

=== General Overhaul Program and post-overhaul ===
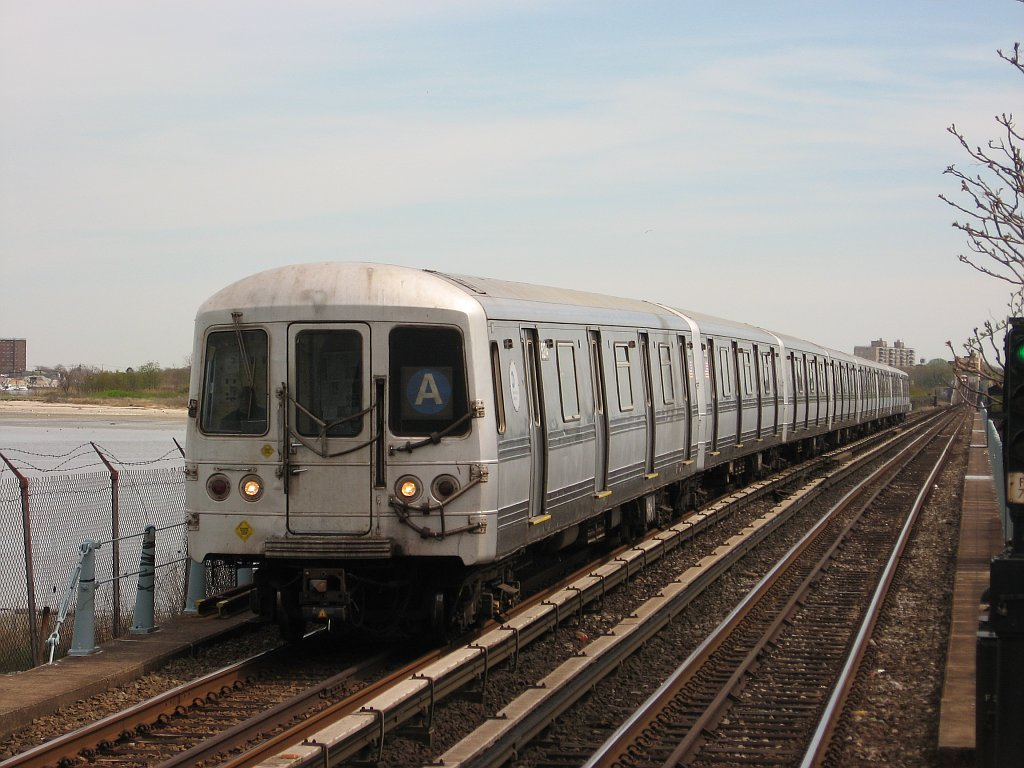
An overhauled NYCT R44 train on the A approaching Broad Channel

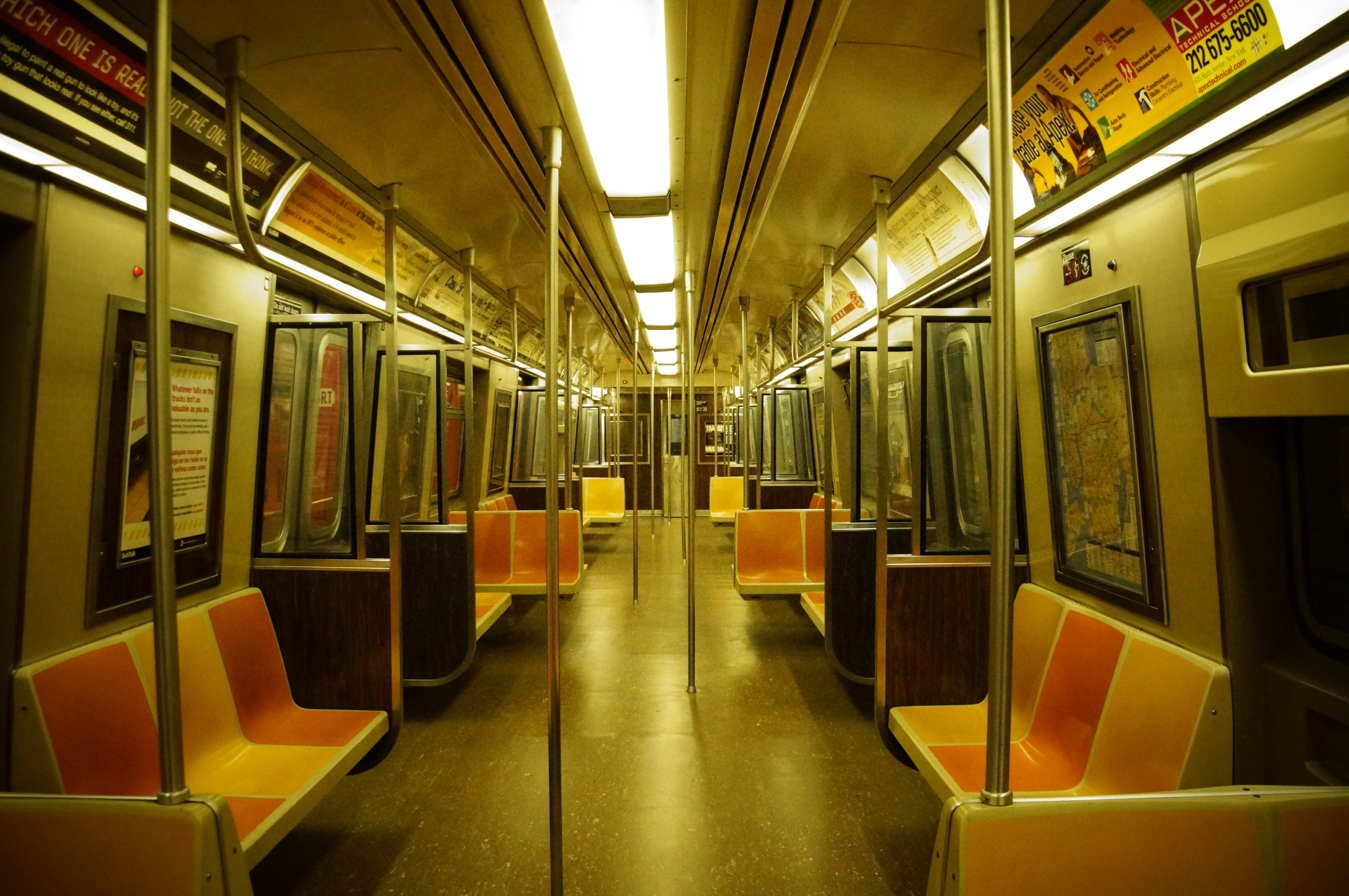
The interior of an overhauled R44ML car at the New York Transit Museum

The R44s were rebuilt beginning in March 1990. They were the last of the MTA's fleet to undergo the General Overhaul (GOH) program as a result of deferred maintenance. 140 cars were rebuilt off property by Morrison–Knudsen in Hornell, New York, and 138 cars were rebuilt in-house at the 207th Street Overhaul Shop in Inwood, Manhattan and the Coney Island Overhaul Shop in Coney Island, Brooklyn. Some improvements included the repainting of the carbon steel blue stripes into silver gray stripes (most NYCT cars) or the replacement of the stripes with stainless steel panels (NYCT cars 5228–5229 and all SIR cars). The rollsigns on the sides were replaced with electronic LCD signs on the NYCT cars and were completely removed on the SIR cars. The entire fleet was renumbered during the overhaul process; by January 1993, all overhauled cars were in service.

Even after the GOH program, several NYCT R44s were retired due to various mishaps. Cars 5319 and 5402 were damaged in separate fire-related incidents. Cars 5282–5285 were involved in a derailment north of 135th Street, resulting in the whole set being placed out of service. Car 5248 was taken out of service in 2004 due to cracked truck bolsters. Cars 5282 and 5319 were completely destroyed and subsequently scrapped in the late 1990s, car 5284 was eventually repaired and returned to service, and the other damaged cars were stored out of service for parts until they were scrapped with the rest of the NYCT cars.

All SIR cars were overhauled for a second time between 2007 and 2010 as a part of scheduled maintenance program. Several improvements included the repainting of the bulkheads, rebuilt trucks, new dark floors, newly repainted periwinkle bucket seats, and updated logos; unlike the NYCT cars, the SIR cars retained their original blue "M" MTA decals during their first overhaul. The cars have been undergoing further intermittent rounds of scheduled maintenance as their parts age over time.

Even after their second overhaul, several SIR R44s were retired due to various mishaps. On December 26, 2008, car 402 was pulled from service after being badly damaged from accidentally hitting a bumper block at the Tottenville station. It was stored at 207th Street Yard and stripped of parts for other SIR cars; by 2013, it was scrapped. In May 2013, cars 399 and 466 were taken out of service after being damaged in a sideswipe. Both cars were also stripped of parts for other SIR cars.

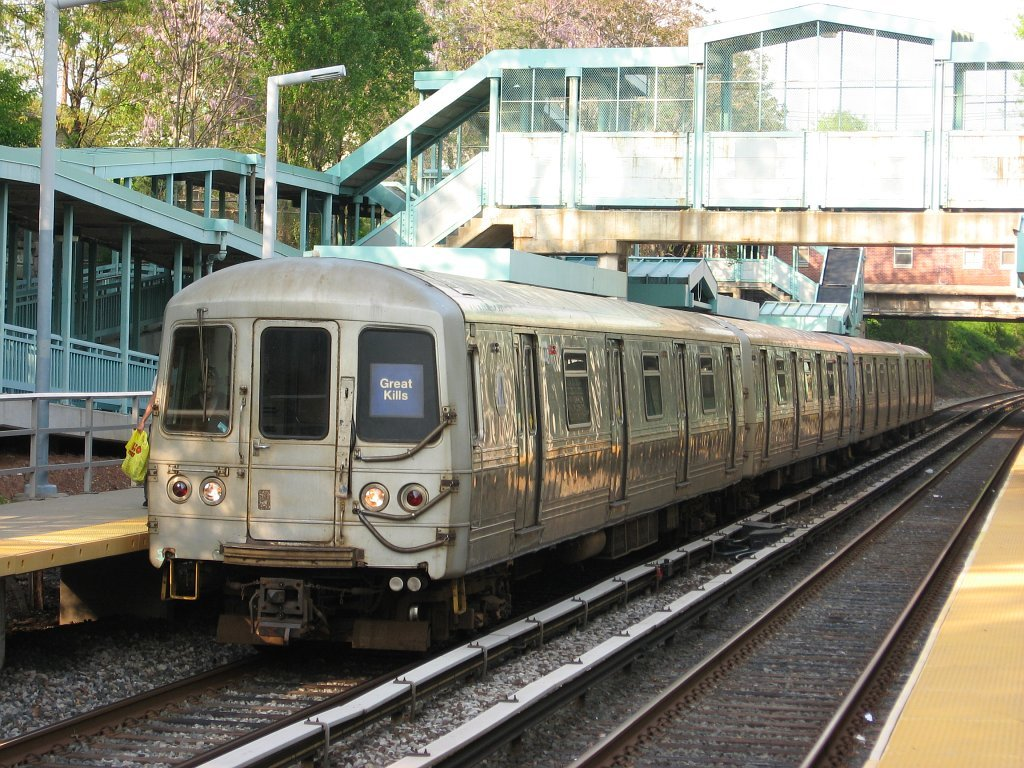
The appearance of a Staten Island Railway R44 car after its first overhaul (1990–1993)

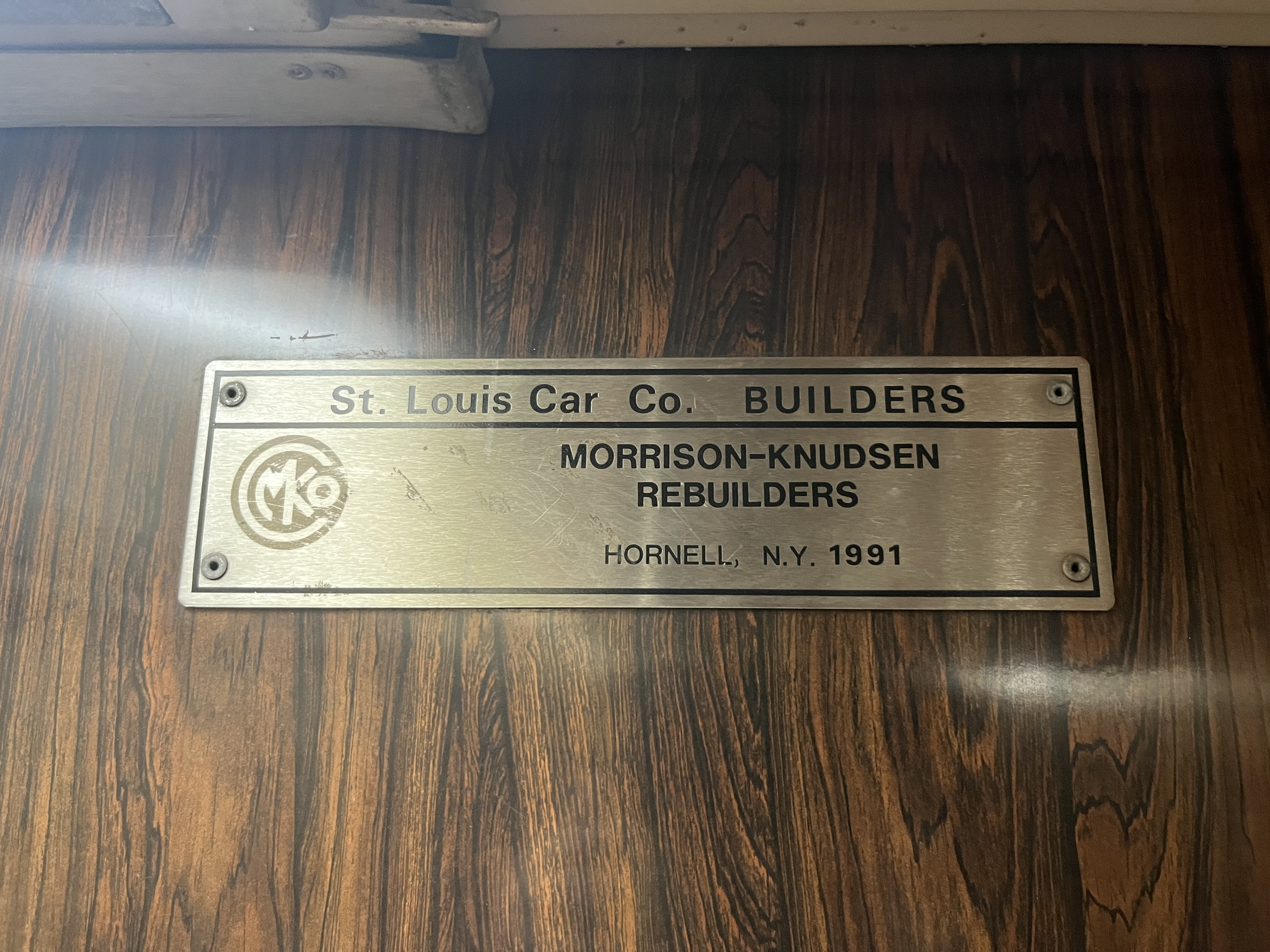
Overhaul plate of the R44MLs

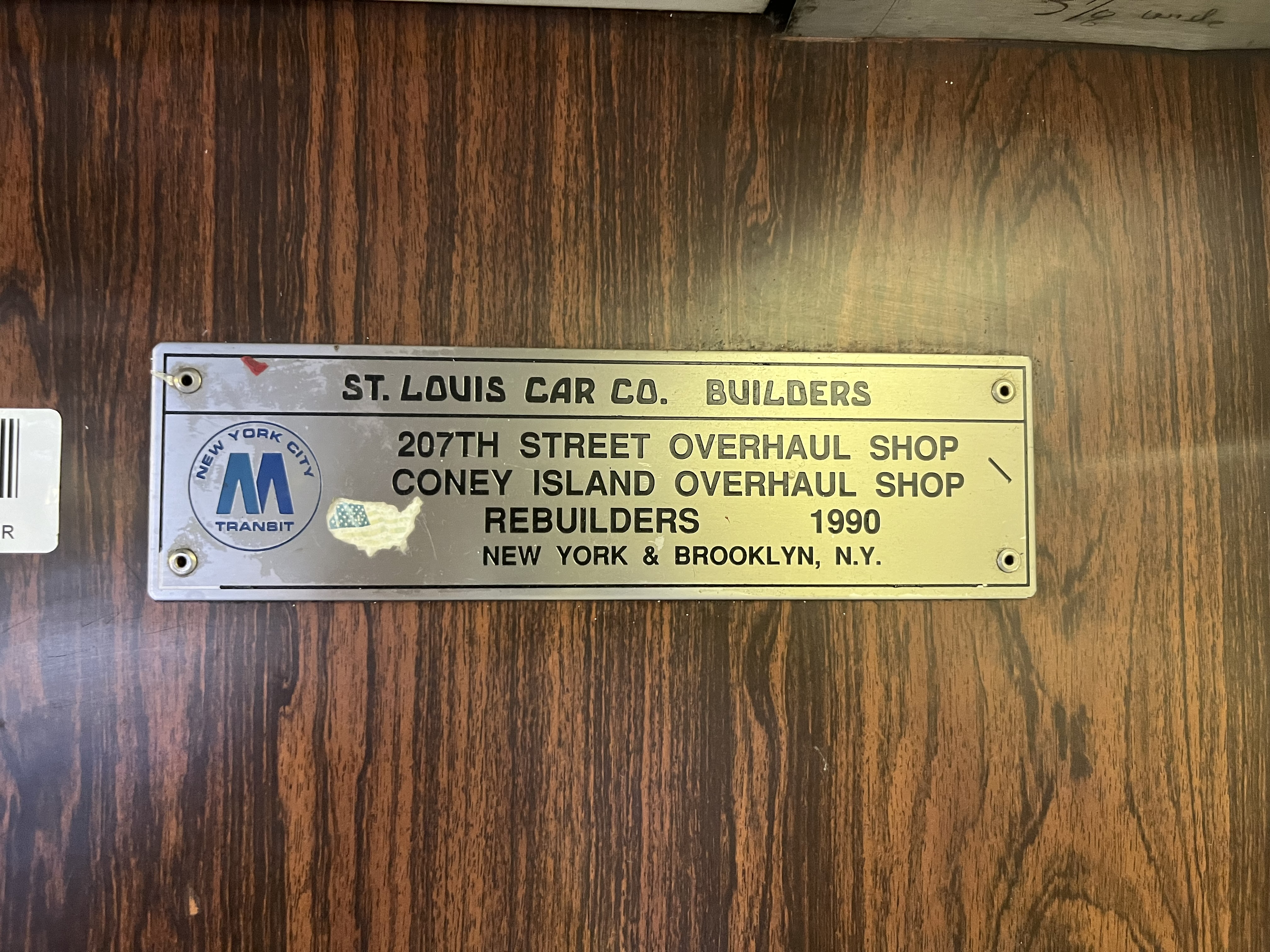
Overhaul plate of the R44S'

=== Retirement ===
==== New York City Transit cars ====
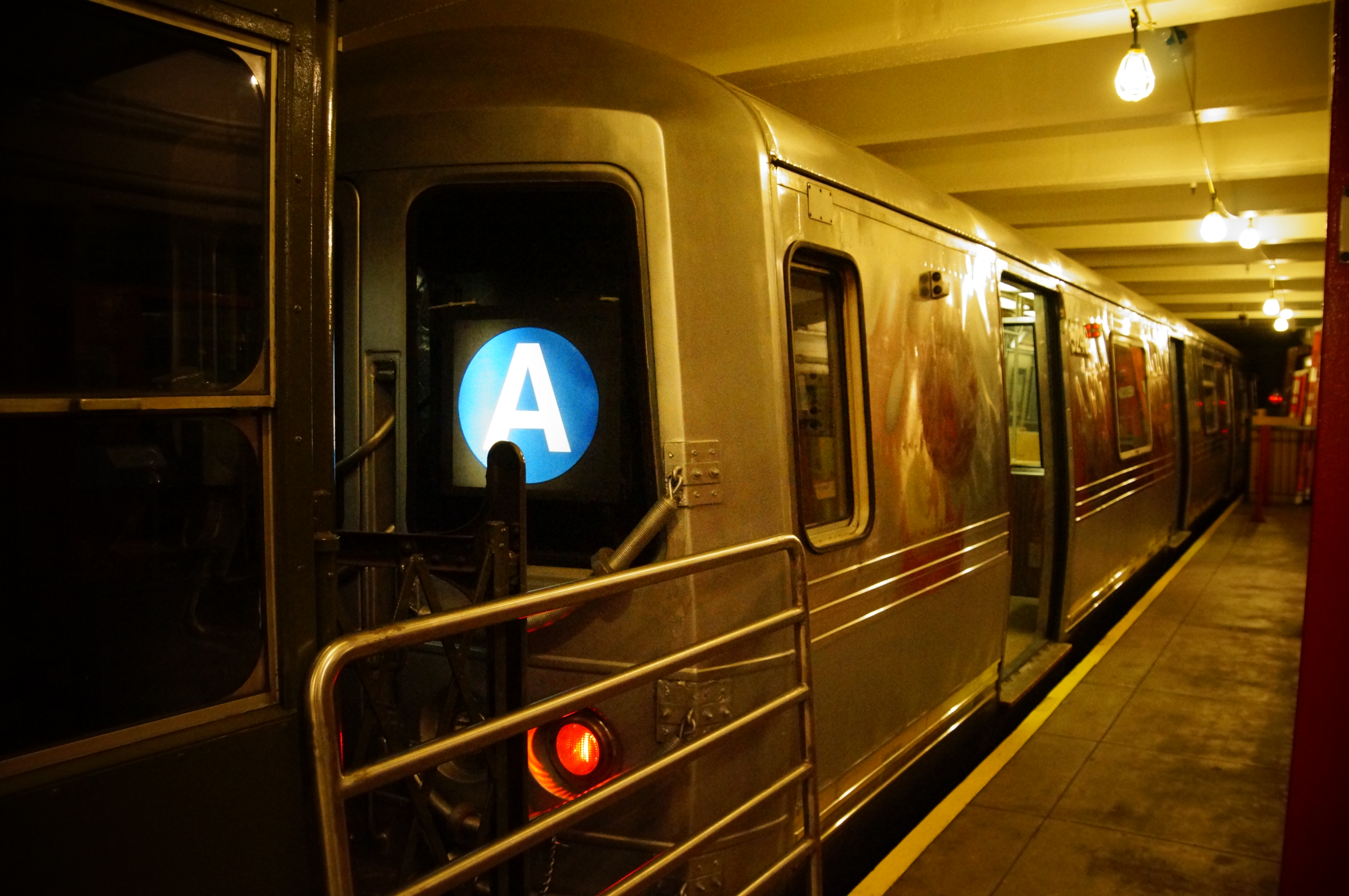
R44ML car 5240 (originally 172) on display at the New York Transit Museum

On December 18, 2009, two 4-car sets of New York City Transit (NYCT) R44s, one set being a contract Morrison-Knudsen rebuild and the other being an in-house Coney Island Overhaul Shop rebuild, were brought in to the 207th Street Overhaul Shop for inspection; the inspection revealed compromised structural integrity at various locations on all eight cars. The R44s were originally planned to be retired by the R179 order. Three months later in March 2010 following these inspections, the decision was made to retire the R44s with the remaining R160 order instead, in place of the R32 and R42 fleet that were being replaced with the R160 order at the time.

That same month, withdrawal of the NYCT R44s from revenue service began, and retirement of the remaining R32 and R42 fleet was postponed indefinitely until they would both eventually be replaced by the R179s in the late 2010s–early 2020s. Retirement progressed until September 16, 2010, when the last train made its final trip on the A. After retirement, the NYCT R44s were placed into storage system-wide.

Initially, the retired NYCT R44s were planned to be stripped of parts and sunk as artificial reefs. Car 5344, part of one of the sets brought in for the initial inspection, was the only NYCT R44 to be completely stripped to its bare shell with all internal parts, doors, lights, and windows removed in preparation for disposal as an artificial reef. However, the car presented a serious contamination hazard that was deemed dangerous to aquatic life in the ocean, and similar hazardous materials was also discovered on other NYCT R44s. It was also deemed too expensive and difficult to process the fleet for disposal as artificial reefs. As such, the plan to reef the NYCT R44s was ultimately canceled in favor of simply scrapping the cars; the reefing program as a whole concluded in April 2010. From May 2012 until summer 2013, most of the NYCT R44s were scrapped at Sims Metal Management's Newark facility. Only five cars remain. The only car that has officially been preserved by the New York Transit Museum is car 5240 (originally 172), which has since been restored and set aside for on-and-off display at the New York Transit Museum. Cars 5286–5289 were also not scrapped and remain stored decommissioned at Coney Island Yard; future plans for this 4-car set remain unknown.

==== Staten Island Railway cars ====
Since January 2022, the remaining R44s have been the oldest active rolling stock within the NYCT system at 53 years old, following the retirement of the R32s.

Like the NYCT cars, the SIR R44s were originally planned to be retired by the R179 order; however, this plan was dropped. Proposals to overhaul and operate some R46s on the SIR to replace the R44s there surfaced instead; however, this plan was also dropped. As such, the SIR R44s not written off received intermittent rounds of scheduled maintenance to extend their usefulness until retirement.

Ultimately, 75 R211S cars were ordered to replace the SIR R44s; these started entering service on October 8, 2024. The SIR R44s were gradually phased out from mid-2023 onwards, with a handful of cars being retired and cannibalized for parts to keep other cars running. By September 2025, enough R211S cars had entered service to fully replace the R44s on the Staten Island Railway; the remaining cars were relegated to a contingency fleet, only running when not enough R211S trains are available.

Since mid-2024, retired cars are being scrapped at Sims Metal Management's Jersey City facility.
