= St. Louis Car Company =

Former American manufacturer of transit vehicles

Coordinates: 38.710668°N 90.225509°W

- St. Louis Car Co. Builders—vehicle badge
- Industry: Builder
- Founded: April 1887; 139 years ago
- Founder: William Lefmann, Peter Kling, Julius Lefmann, Henry Schroeder, Daniel McAllister, Henry Maune, Charles Ernst
- Defunct: 1974; 52 years ago
- Fate: Ceased operations
- Headquarters: St. Louis, Missouri, United States
- Area served: United States; Canada
- Key people: George J. Kobusch, Peter Kling, John H. Kobusch, Henry F. Vogel, John I. Beggs, Robert McCulloch, Richard McCulloch, Robert P. McCulloch, Edwin B. Meissner
- Products: Railroad passenger cars, locomotives, streetcars, and trolleybuses; automobiles
- Parent: General Steel Industries (1960–)
- Subsidiaries: St. Louis Aircraft Corporation

The St. Louis Car Company was a major American manufacturer of railroad passenger cars, streetcars, interurbans, trolleybuses and locomotives. Based in St. Louis, Missouri, it operated from 1887 to 1974.

Among its most successful products were the Birney Safety Car, made from 1915 until 1930, and the PCC streetcar, from 1936 to 1952.

== History ==
The St. Louis Car Company was formed in April 1887 to manufacture and sell streetcars, trolleys, and other rolling stock to the street railway industry. The company supplied transit companies in various cities, including St. Louis, New York City, Chicago, and the Paris Metro in France.

From 1906 to 1911, the company built automobiles, including the American Mors, the Skelton, and the Standard Six.

In 1917, the company joined with Huttig Sash and Door to launch the St. Louis Aircraft Corporation. It operated for about a year, then went dormant. Revived in 1938, it built gliders, trainers, alligators, flying boats, and dirigible gondolas until 1945.

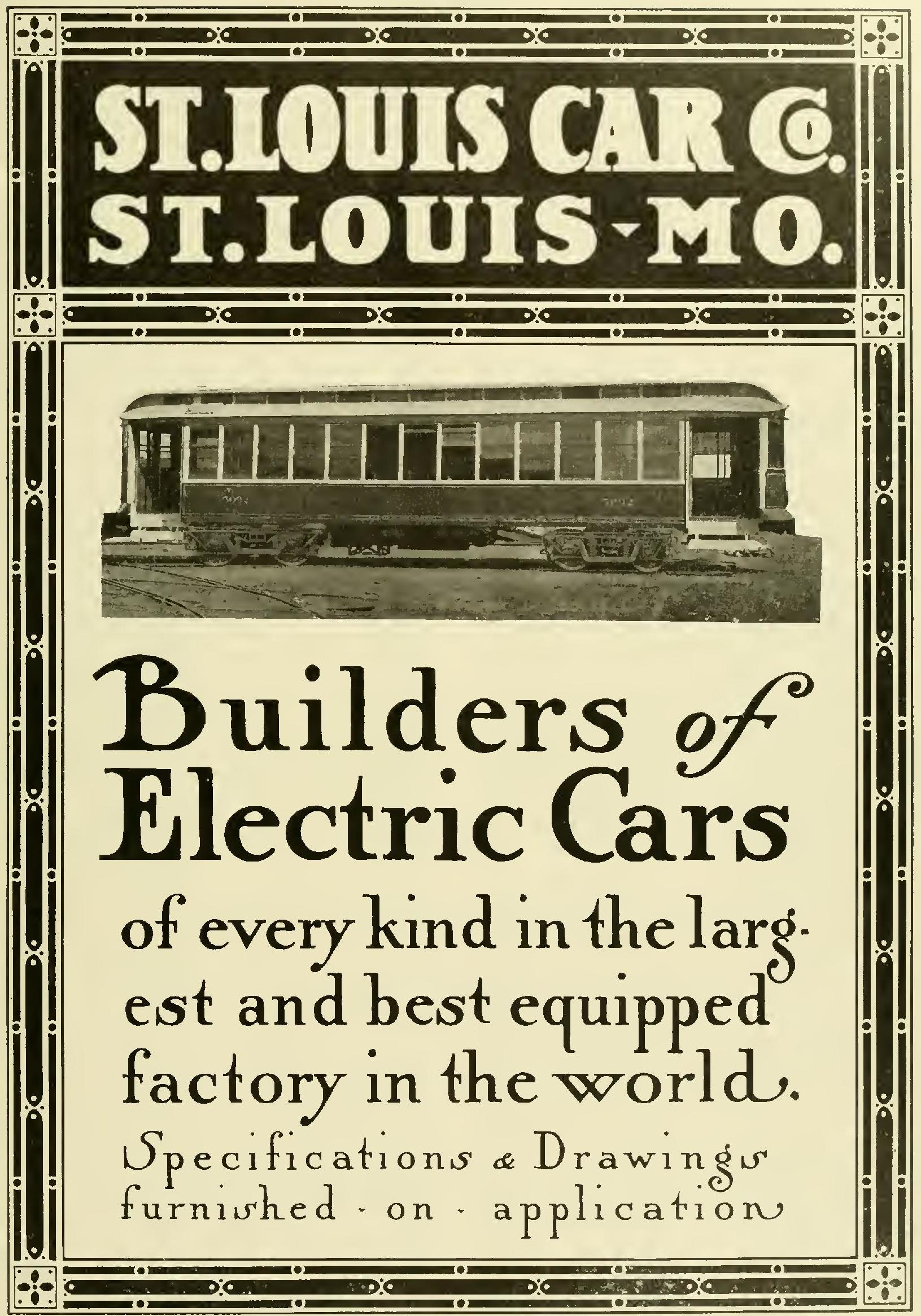
"ST. LOUIS CAR CO. ST. LOUIS MO." "Builders of Electric Cars of every kind" in Electric Railway Review, 1908

In 1939, it made the FM OP800 railcars for the Southern Railway.

Company president Edwin B. Meissner Sr. died at age 71 on Sept. 12, 1956. He was succeeded by Edwin B. Meissner Jr.

In 1960, St. Louis Car Company was acquired by General Steel Industries.

In 1964, it completed an order of 430 World's Fair picture-window cars (R36 WF) for the New York City Subway and was building 162 PA-1s (110 single units, 52 trailers) for the Port Authority of New York and New Jersey for their use on the Port Authority Trans-Hudson line to New Jersey.

In the mid-1960s, the company built the passenger capsules, designed by Planet Corporation, to ferry visitors to the top of the Gateway Arch at the Gateway Arch National Park in St. Louis.

St. Louis continued to do business until ceasing operations in 1974. The company's last products were R44 subway cars for the New York City Subway and Staten Island Rapid Transit, and in 1972, the R44-based USDOT State-of-the-Art Car rapid transit demonstrator set.

The St. Louis Car assembly plant and general office at 8000 Hall Street is now the St. Louis Business Center, a mixed-use industrial and commercial complex redeveloped starting in 2005.

== Products ==
- PCC streetcars (1935-1952)
- Peter Witt streetcars
- Trolley buses
- Interurban cars
- Gas-electric railcars
- CRT/CTA 5003-5004 PCC elevated-subway cars (1947) - retired 1985
- CTA 6000-series PCC elevated-subway cars (1950–59) - retired 1992
- CTA 1-50 PCC elevated-subway cars (1959–60) - retired 1999
- Chicago North Shore and Milwaukee Railroad Electroliner (1941)
- Electro-Motive Company (EMC) gas-electric railcars - car body shells (1920s)
- Fairbanks-Morse experimental center cab diesel switchers and FM OP800 railcars (1939)
- GCRTA Red Line "Bluebirds" (1954–55, 1958)
- MBTA #3 East Boston Tunnel cars (1951)
- State of the Art Car heavy rail transit demonstrator set for USDOT (1972–74) - now at Seashore Trolley Museum
- Illinois Terminal Railroad Streamliners (1948–50)
- IRT World's Fair Steinway Motors (1938) - built for 1939 World's Fair
- Metra Illinois Central Electric District Highliner electric MU cars (1971–72)
- NJ Transit/NJDOT/Penn Central Arrow I (PRR MP85E6) electric MU cars - push-pull coach conversion (1968)
- New York Central Railroad ACMU 4500 series (1950–51)
- NYCT R8A (1939)
- NYCT R17 (1954–55)
- NYCT R21 (1956–57)
- NYCT R22 (1957–58)
- NYCT R27 (1960–61)
- NYCT R29 (1962)
- NYCT R30 (1961–62)
- NYCT R33 (1962–63)
- NYCT R33S (1963)
- NYCT R36 (1963–64)
- NYCT R38 (1966–67)
- NYCT R40 (1967–68)
- NYCT R40A (1968–69)
- NYCT R42 (1969–70)
- NYCT R44 (1971–73)
- Chicago and North Western Railway Gallery 7600 series coaches #1-16 (1955)
- Pacific Electric Railway "Hollywood" cars (1920s)
- Philadelphia and Western Railroad original wood cars and freight motors (1907)
- Hudson & Manhattan Railroad/PATH "K-car"/MP51 (1958)
- PATH PA1 (1965) & PA2 (1967)
- San Diego Class 1 streetcars (1910-1912)
- Seaboard Air Line Railroad 2027-2028 Railcars (1936)
- SEPTA Silverliner III (PRR MP85) cars (1967)
- Staten Island Railway R44 (1973) (last St. Louis cars)
- U.S. Army (USAX) cars - various types including coaches, ambulance, cafeteria, sleepers
- Union Pacific Railroad lightweight passenger cars, express and baggage cars (1960–65)
- Victorian Railways Petrol Electric railmotor (1928)
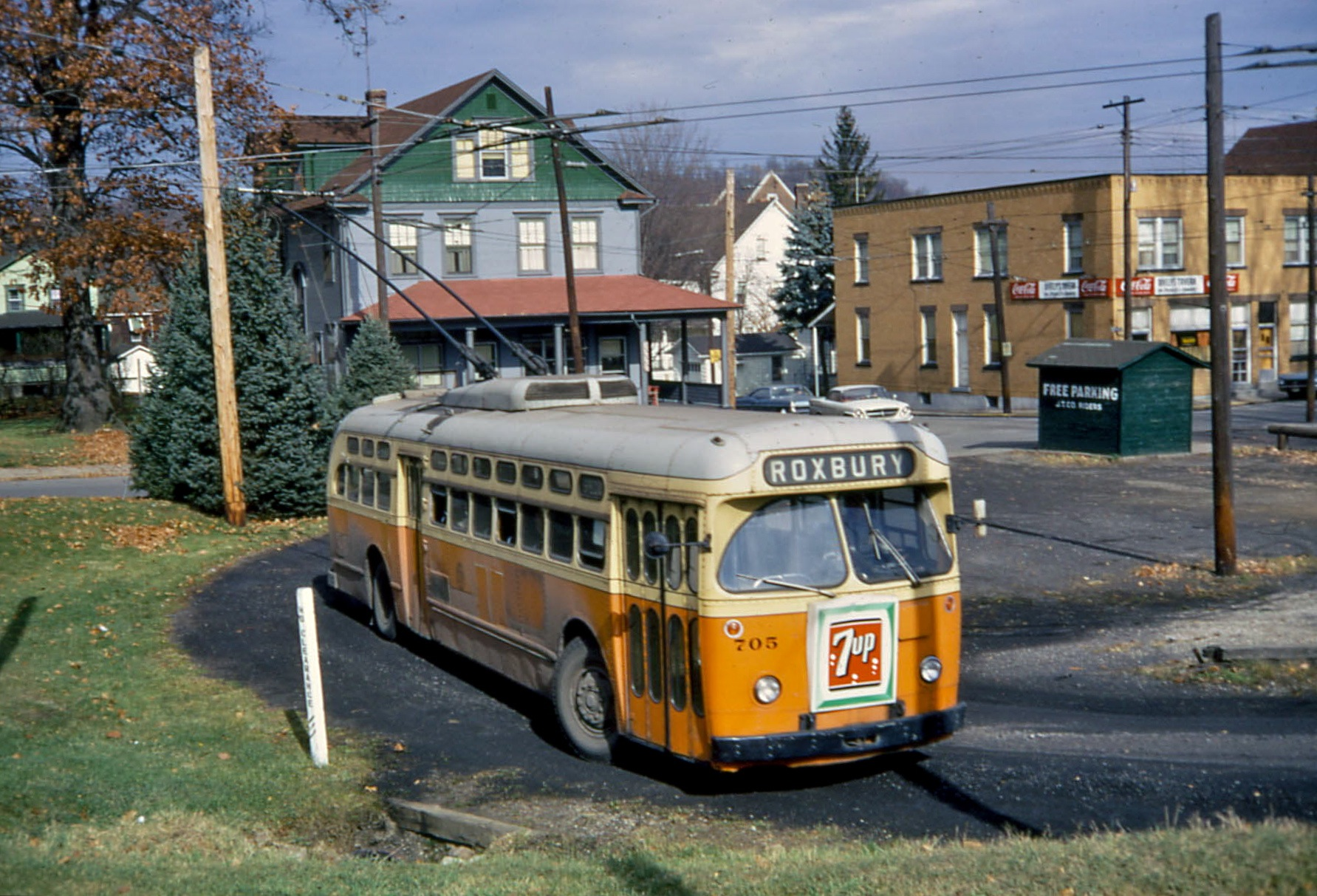
A St. Louis Car-built trolley bus in Johnstown, Pennsylvania, in 1967

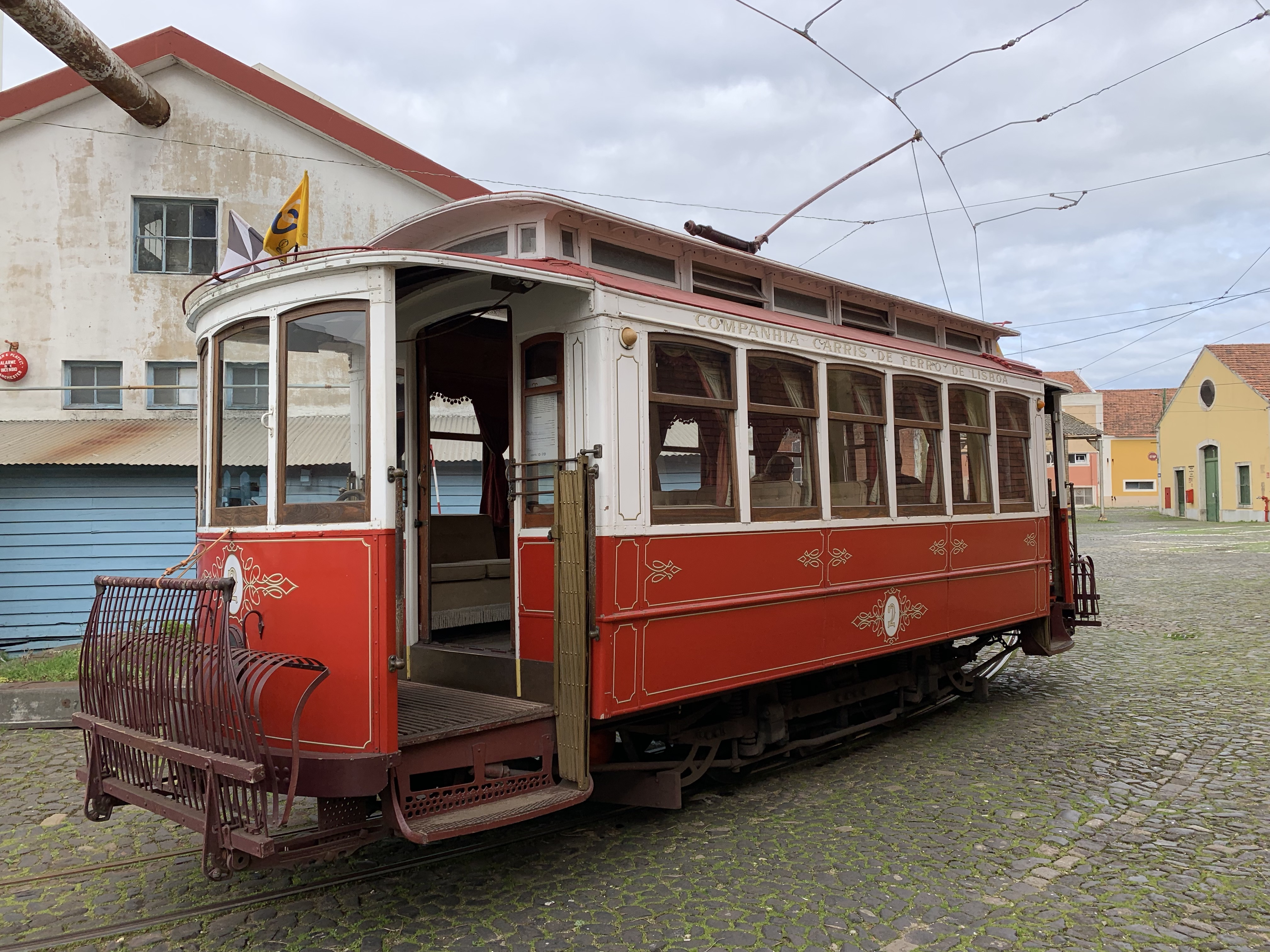
One of the few surviving Lisbon's São Luís type cars (series 400–474): of the original batch of 75 units, imported in 1901 and retired up to 1973, most were scrapped, three remain operational in Lisbon (a museum car restored to original condition and two modified for tourist duty since 1965, fitted with luxury upholstering — No.2, former No.435, on the photo), and five saw heritage use in Detroit in 1978–2003.

== See also ==
- Brownell Car Company
- Canada Car and Foundry
- Canadian Vickers
- F-Market & Wharves Streetcar Line
- John I. Beggs
- List of rolling stock manufacturers
- New York City Subway rolling stock
- Ottawa Car Company
