= Seashore Trolley Museum =

Transit vehicle museum in Arundel, Maine

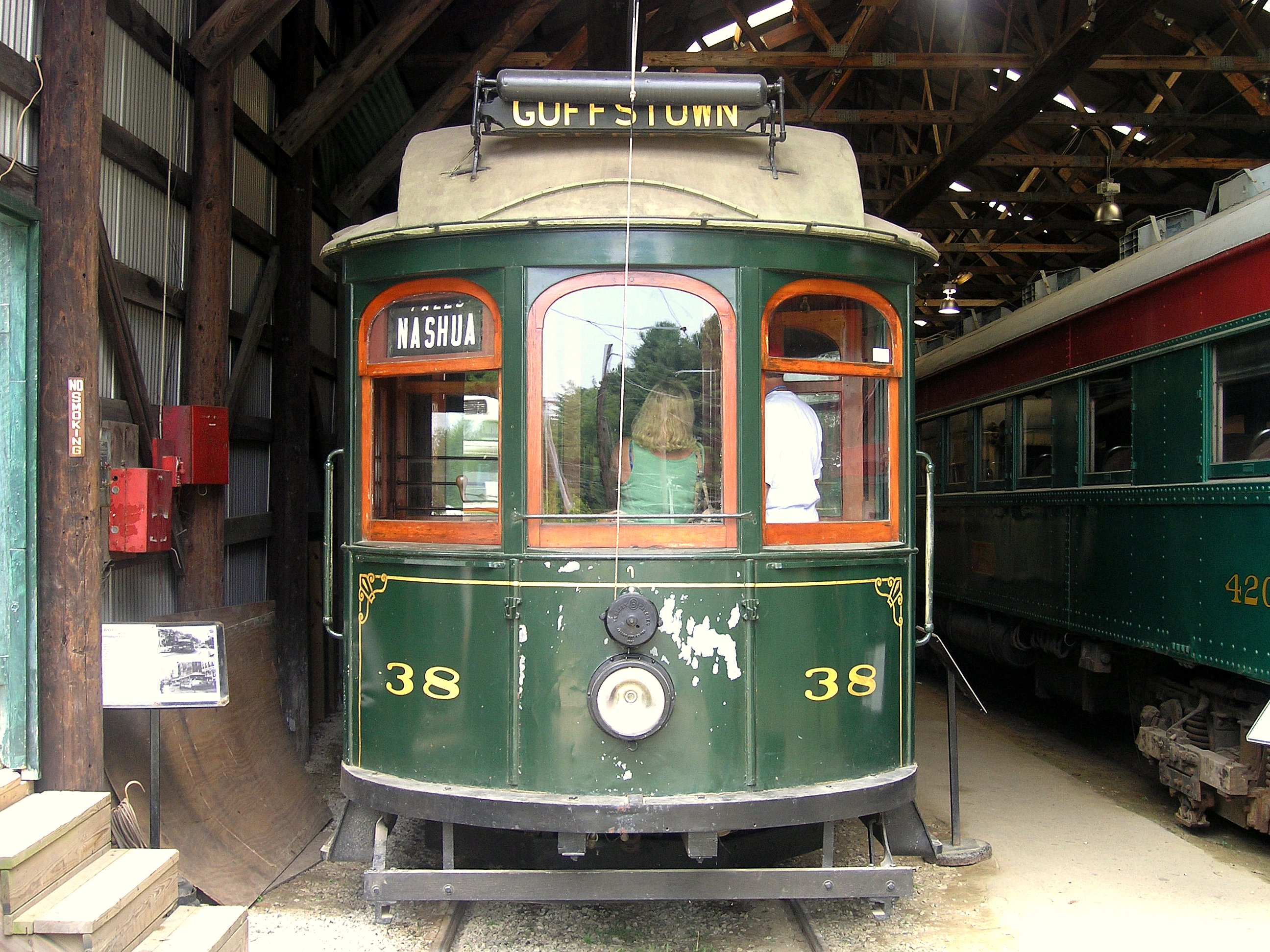
- Manchester Street Railway 38 is a Laconia built car preserved at the Seashore Trolley Museum
- Established: 1939
- Coordinates: 43.409112°N 70.489416°W
- Executive director: Katie Orlando
- President: James Schantz
- Chairperson: Robert Drye
- Historian: Richmond Bates
- Owner: New England Electric Railway Historical Society
- Website: trolleymuseum.org

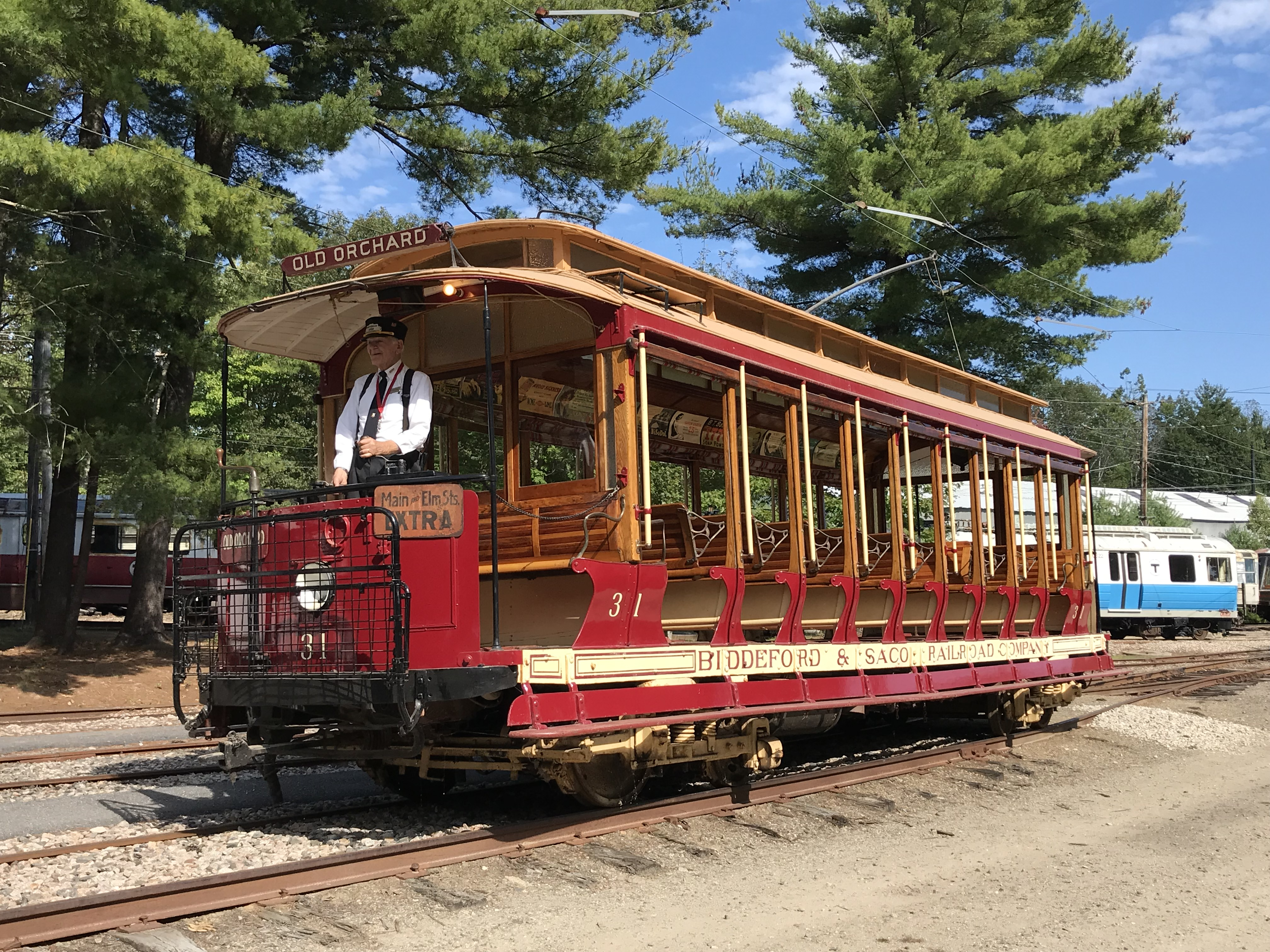
Biddeford & Saco car 31 is the first trolley ever preserved in the world.

The Seashore Trolley Museum, located in Kennebunkport, Maine, United States, is the world's first and largest museum of mass transit vehicles. While the main focus of the collection is trolley cars (trams), it also includes rapid transit trains, Interurban cars, trolley buses, and motor buses. The Seashore Trolley Museum is owned and operated by the New England Electric Railway Historical Society (NEERHS). Of the museum's collection of more than 350 vehicles, ten trolley and railroad cars that historically operated in Maine were listed on the National Register of Historic Places in 1980 as Maine Trolley Cars. A separate building houses the largest model railroad layout in the state of Maine.

== History ==
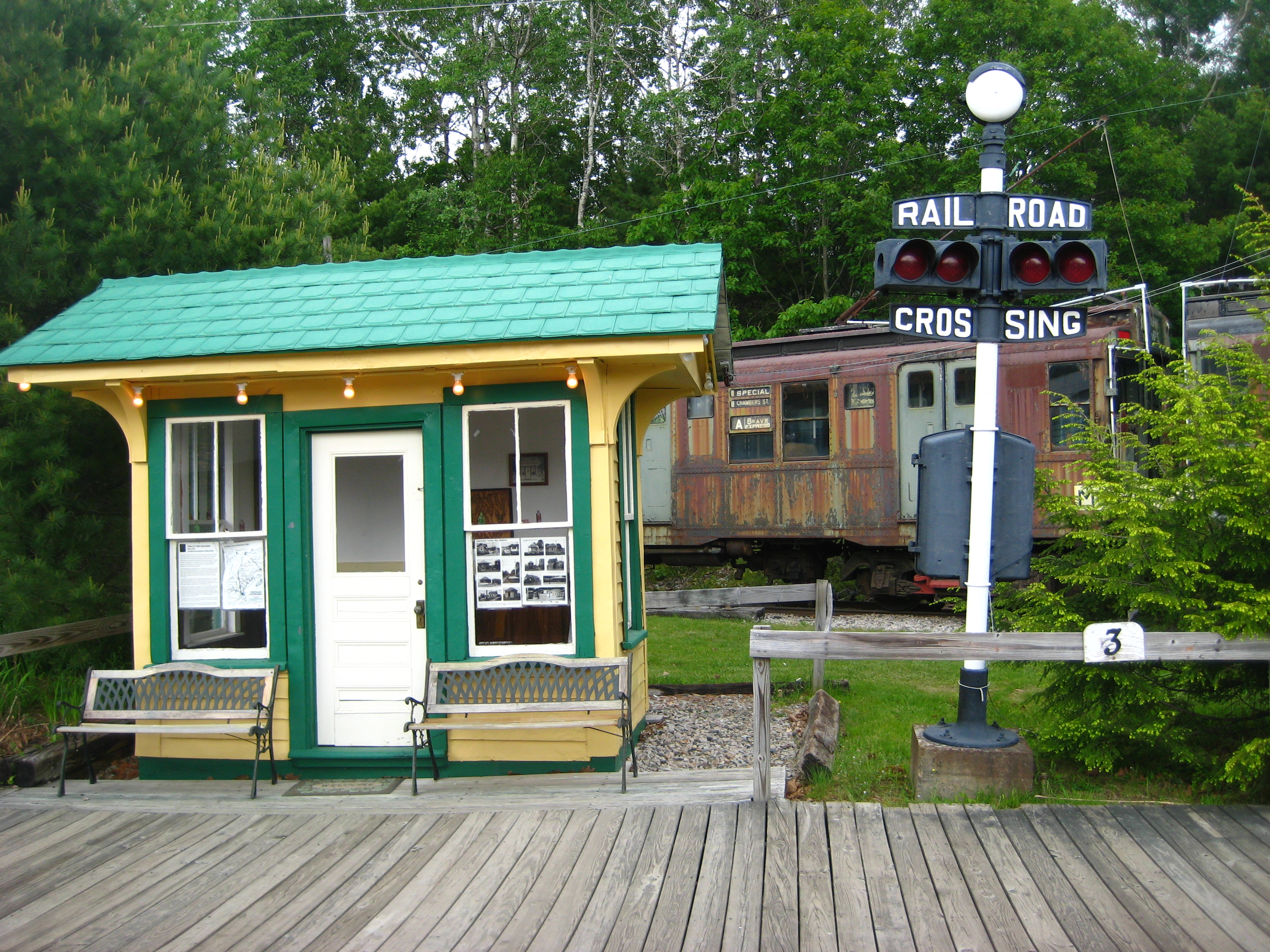
The Morrison Hill Station at the Seashore Trolley Museum

Theodore F. Santarelli de Brasch and Osmond Richard Cummings were two of the founders of the museum, which was initially operated as the Seashore Electric Railway. Santarelli graduated from Harvard University and led the museum until he died in 1987; Cummings, a New England railroad historian, died in 2013.

The events that led to the formation of the museum started in 1939 when a group of railfans learned that the Biddeford & Saco Railroad were purchasing motor buses to replace its fleet of trolley cars. More and more trolley companies were doing this as the technology of buses had developed to the point that they were reliable and economical.

The rail fans decided to find out if they could purchase a trolley to preserve it for posterity. The railroad was willing to sell them a car (#31, a 12 bench open trolley) for $150 ($3,472 in 2025). However, it would have to be moved to another location due to local ordinances that prohibited retired trolleys from being used as houses, even though this was not the rail fans' intention.

A portion of farmland was rented on Log Cabin Road in Kennebunkport, adjacent to the right-of-way for the Atlantic Shore Line Railway's Kennebunk-Biddeford route, and the trolley was moved to it.

At about the same time, another group of rail fans purchased a trolley from the Manchester and Nashua Street Railway. The two groups merged, and the Nashua trolley was brought to the Log Cabin Road site. The group of founders formally incorporated in 1941 as the New England Electric Railway Historical Society.

World War II caused the museum to be put on hold, as many members served in the armed forces for the duration. This also brought about a temporary revival of trolley services in many cities, as rubber and gasoline were rationed for the war effort.

After the war, conversion of trolley lines to buses resumed, and created a period of rapid growth for the museum's collection.

In the 1950s, a diesel-powered electric generator was used to allow the cars to move under their own power. Car 31 was moved into a small building so that it could be repaired and restored. The first major expansion occurred in late 1955 and early 1956, when the Society purchased land near the Biddeford city line along U.S. Route 1. In the summer of 1956, the Seashore Electric Railway began passenger operations on weekends over its 1/4-mile-long (0.40 km) track.

In 1980, ten of the museum's trolley and railroad cars were listed on the National Register of Historic Places (as "Maine Trolley Cars"). These include trolley #31 and other vehicles either built or operated in Maine. Two cars of the Aroostook Valley Railroad, and two built by the York Utilities Company of Sanford are included in this collection.

As of 2010, the museum had over 260 vehicles. While most are from New England and other areas of the United States, trolleys from Canada, Australia, Japan, Germany, Hungary, England, Scotland, Italy, and several other countries are also in the collection. One of the motor buses the museum owns is Biddeford and Saco #31, the bus that replaced trolley #31 in 1939. The bus was donated to the museum by the bus company. The Seashore Trolley Museum continues to acquire new vehicles for the collection.

== Equipment ==
Rapid Transit Cars
Name	Class	Images	Manufacturer	Year built	Year acquired by Museum	Retired	Notes
Budapest Metro 18	N/A	N/A	Halske / Schlick'sche	1896	1991	N/A	From Hungary
Interborough Rapid Transit 3352	Gibbs Hi-V	N/A	American Car & Foundry	1904	1956	1956	Only car in its class preserved
MTA/MBTA 210	#3 Main Line El (Orange Line)	N/A	American Car & Foundry	1906	1994	1994	None
MBTA 512-513	500-Series	N/A	Pullman-Standard	1923	1987	1987	Married-Pair configuration, train also known as #1 Cars
MBTA 546-547	500-Series	N/A	Pullman-Standard	1924	1987	1987	Married-Pair configuration, train also known as #2 Cars
Staten Island Railway/New York City Subway 366	ME-1	N/A	Standard Steel Car Company	1925	1993	1973	Donated from the Trolley Museum of New York
MTA/MBTA 719 & 753	#4 Cambridge-Dorchester	N/A	N/A	1927	1970	1970	None
MTA/MBTA 997 & 1000	#10 Main Line El (Orange Line)	N/A	Wason Manufacturing Company	1928	1980/1981	1980	Single units
Independent Subway System 800	R4		American Car & Foundry	1933	1989	1970s	Ran excursions with the New York Transit Museum from the 1970s to the 1980s
Independent Subway System 1440	R7		American Car & Foundry	1937	1990	1977	Ran excursions with the New York Transit Museum from the 1970s to 1990
SEPTA 1018 & 1023	B-II/B-III		J. G. Brill Company	1938	1984	1984	Single units
MBTA 559 & 562	500-Series	N/A	St. Louis Car Company	1951	1985	1985	Ran excursions with the New York Transit Museum from the 1970s to 1990
New York City Subway 7371	R22	N/A	American Car & Foundry	1957	2005	1987	Single unit
CTA 6599-6600	6000-Series		St. Louis Car Company	1957	1994	1994	Used PCC equipment
MBTA 1178-1179	1100-Series	N/A	Pullman-Standard	1951	1991	1981	None
Greater Cleveland RTA 113	N/A	N/A	St. Louis Car Company	1951	1991	1981	None
CTA 1	1-50 Series		St. Louis Car Company	1959	2016	1974	Used PCC equipment
New York City Subway 9327	R33S		St. Louis Car Company	1964	2005	2005	In a redbird scheme, single unit
MBTA 1450 & 1455	1400-Series (Red Line)		Pullman-Standard	1963	1997	1990s	Originally painted blue in the 1960s
United States Department of Transportation 1-2	SOAC		St. Louis Car Company	1974	1989	1970s	Built from R44 shells, the SOAC was an experimental train that toured New York, Boston, Chicago, Philadelphia and Cleveland
MBTA 622 & 623	600-Series (Blue line)		Hawker-Siddeley Canada	1978	2009	2009	Similar to the 1200-Series cars on the Orange Line

== Exhibits and features ==
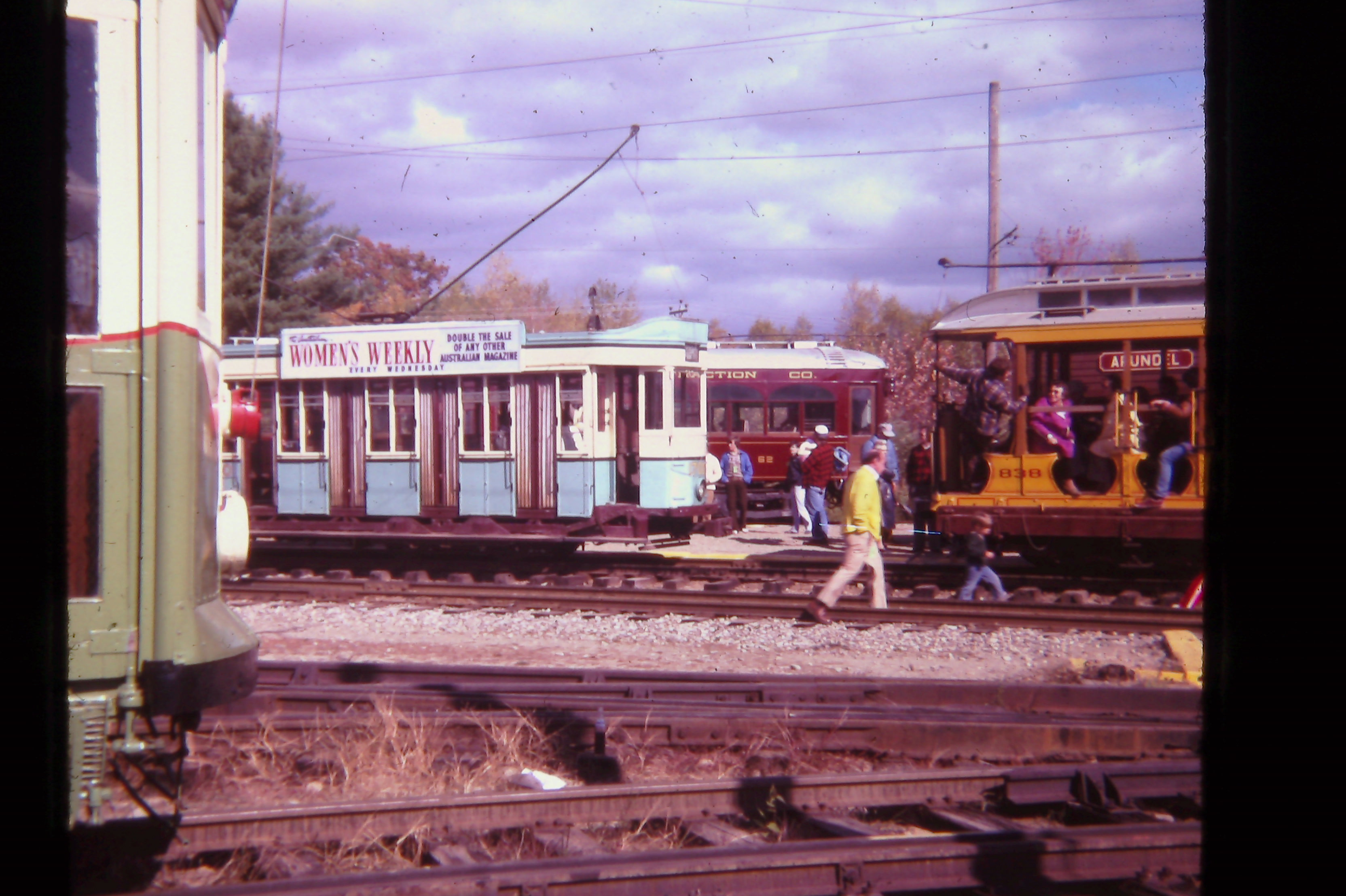
Cars 434 (Dallas, TX), 1700 (Sydney, Australia), 62 (Philadelphia, PA), and 838 (New Haven, CT)

The main building at the museum is the Visitors Center. It includes a ticket booth and a museum store.

The trolleys that have been restored to operating condition are shown on display in three car barns. A restoration shop with an elevated observation gallery shows visitors how the vehicles are maintained and restored. Additional storage barns and tracks, which are not accessible to the general public, contain vehicles that are awaiting restoration. A few of the restored trolleys are operating on the demonstration line at one time.

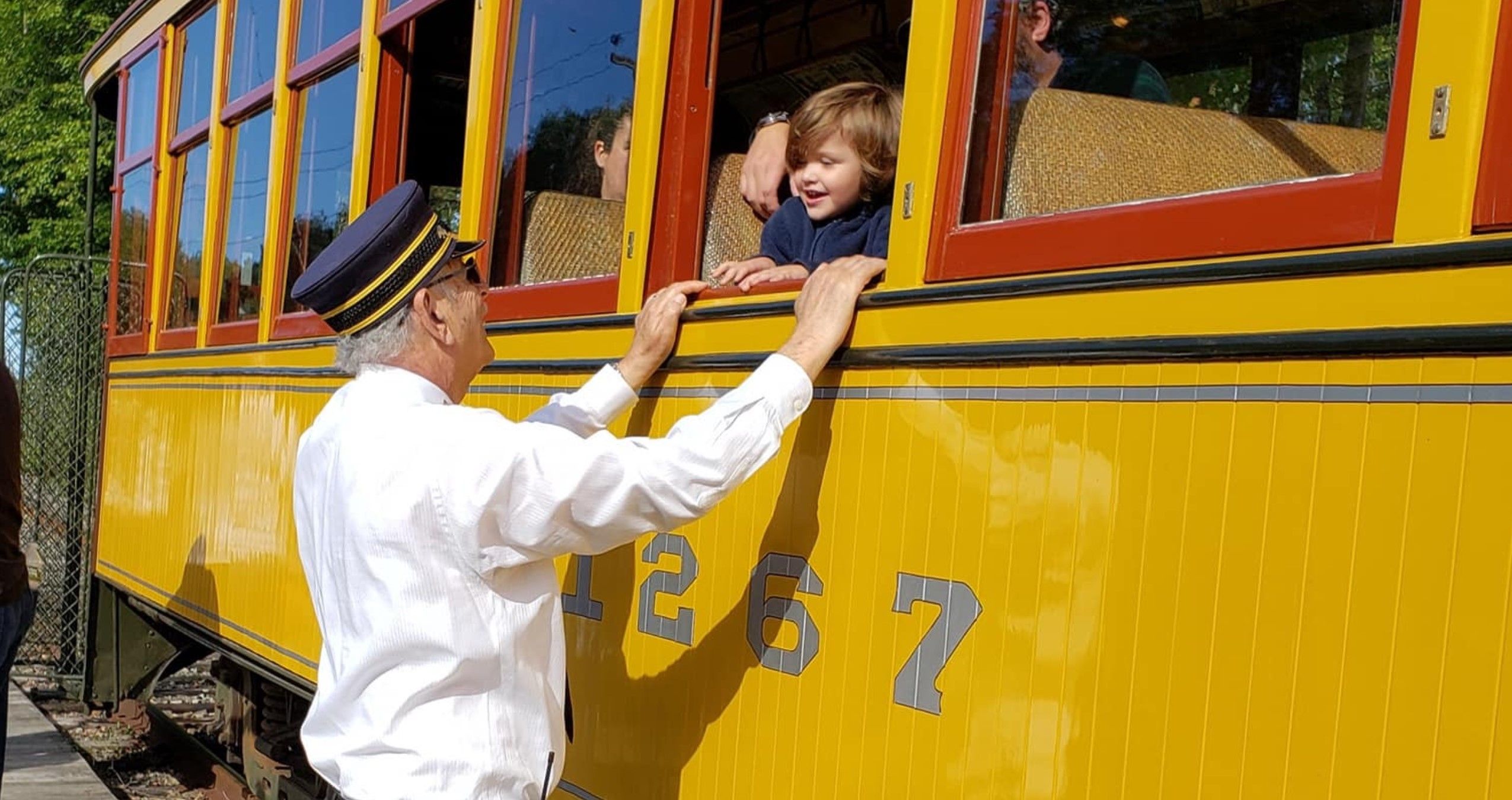
The museum relies on mostly volunteers for daily operations.

Restored trolleys are used on the museum's demonstration railway, which follows the route of the Atlantic Shore Line, a trolley line that ran on the current museum property and connected Kennebunkport to York Beach. Since the line was abandoned in the 1920s, museum volunteers have rebuilt one and a half miles (2.4 km) from scratch. Seashore owns the right of way to Biddeford, which is about 5 mi (8.0 km) from the Visitor Center. A demonstration route leads one and a half miles (2.4 km) to Talbott Park (which is a loop to turn around the trolleys) and back to the Visitor Center.

The collection of trolley buses includes vehicles from all over the country, and the world, of which about twenty are in operating condition. Restoration on as many as six to seven cars is underway at all times. Discussions are under way to extend the trolley bus line and to rehabilitate the existing line.

The museum holds many themed events throughout the operating season (May–December) including Pumpkin Patch Trolley, Daniel Tiger Visits Seashore, appreciation days for several operating fleet trolleys in its collection, free children's story time for guests and the community, and special holiday rides in November and December. The exhibit room may be rented for parties, gatherings, meetings or family reunions.

A new building to house the museum's model railroad layout opened in May 2024 and transitioned to year-round operation in early 2025. Presented in HO scale and based on the Maine Central Railroad, the original layout was donated to the museum in 2020 by a couple from Jonesport, Maine.

== See also ==
- Boston Street Railway Association
- Heritage railway
- List of heritage railways
- National Register of Historic Places listings in York County, Maine
- Shore Line Trolley Museum
- State of the Art Car
