= Aroostook Valley Railroad =

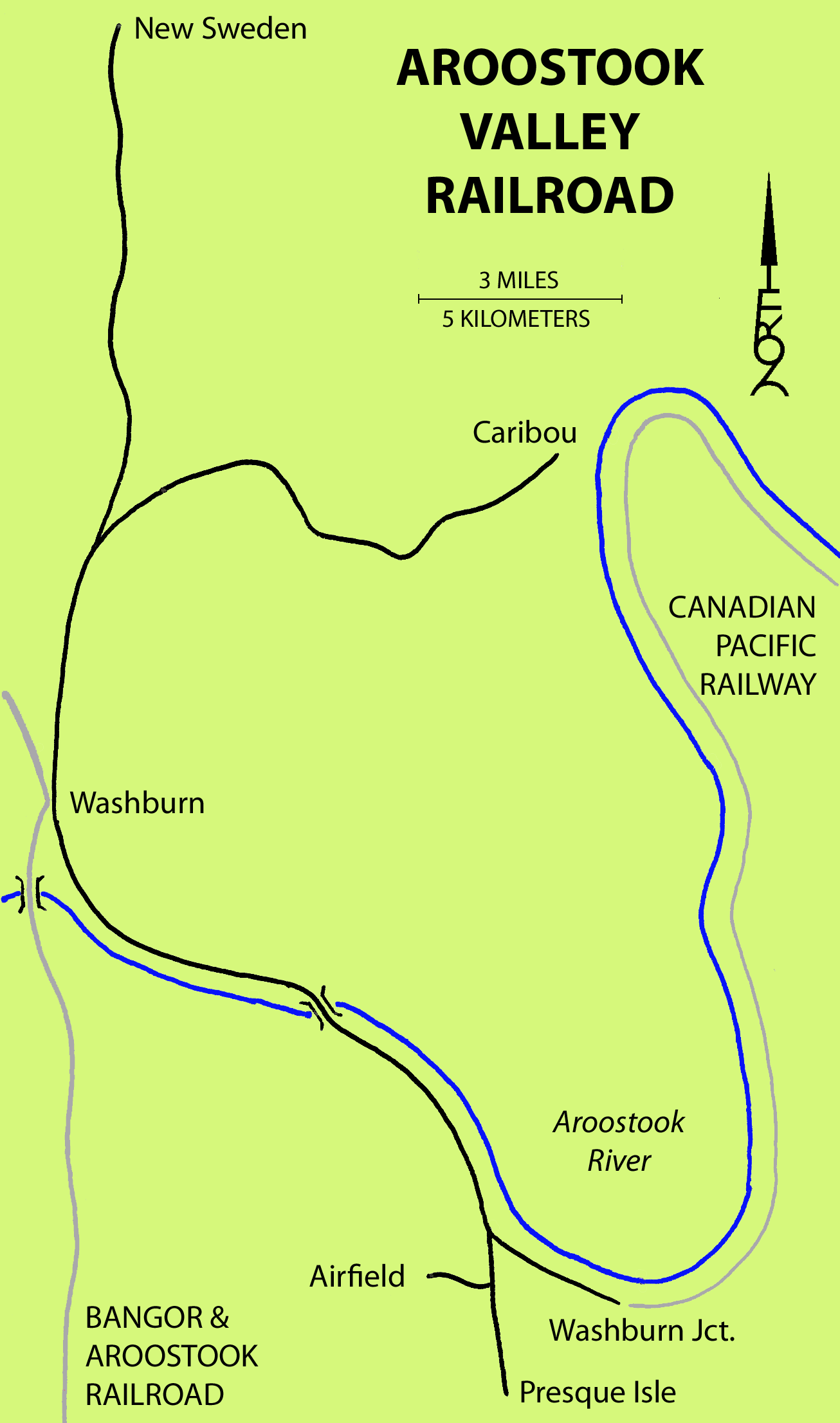

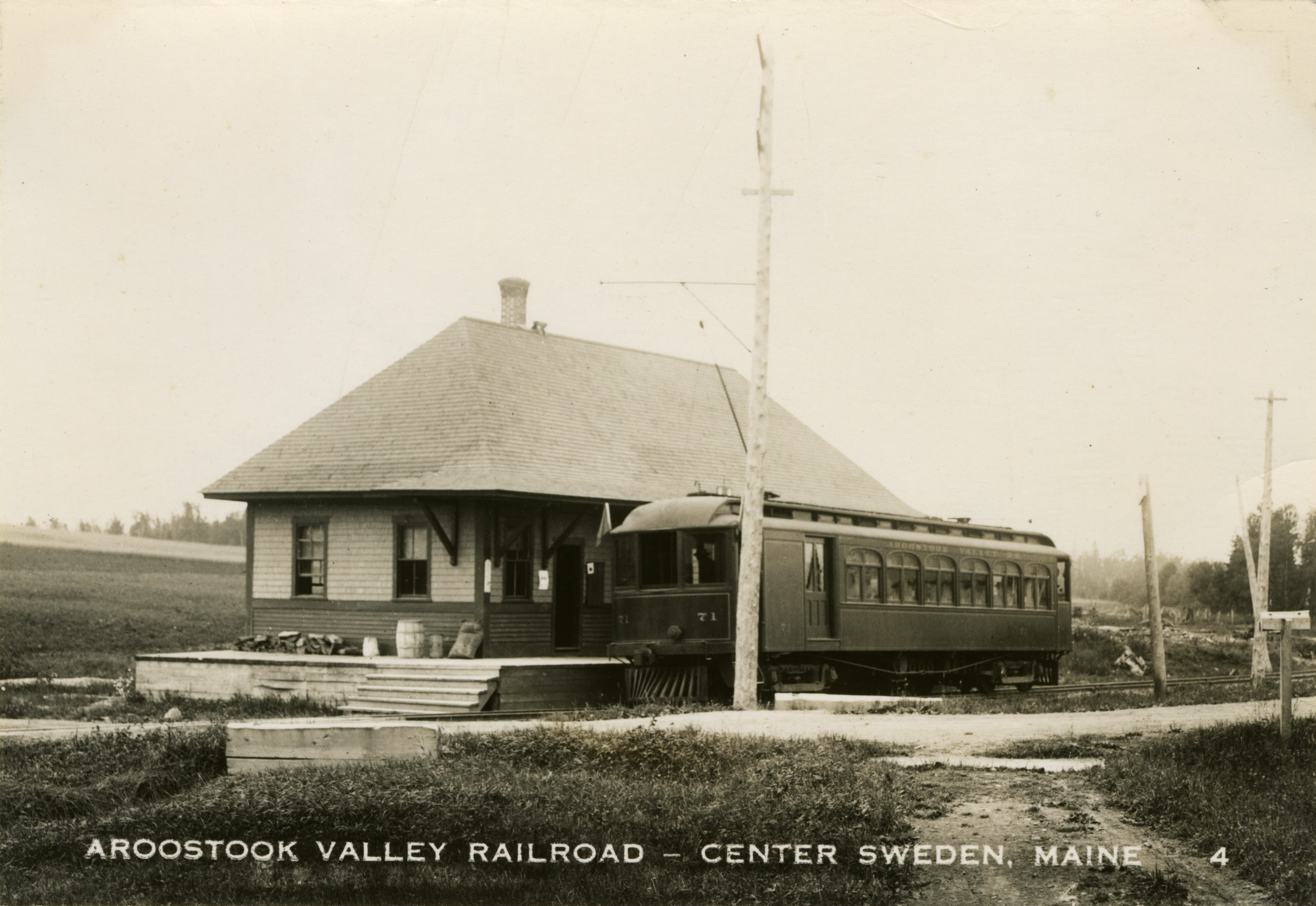
- Aroostook Valley Railroad Trolley Car 71 seen in New Sweden, Maine c. 1915. (NERHS collection.)

Overview
- Headquarters: Presque Isle, Maine
- Reporting mark: AVR
- Locale: Aroostook County, Maine
- Dates of operation: 1910–1996

Technical
- Track gauge: 4 ft 8 1/2 in (1,435 mm) standard gauge
- Electrification: Until 1945
- Length: 29.2 miles (47.0 km)

The Aroostook Valley Railroad (reporting mark AVR) was a railroad that operated between Presque Isle and Caribou, Maine from the early 1900s to 1996. The railroad operated maroon interurban cars with grey roofs on 1200 volt DC power until 1945.

== History ==
Arthur R. Gould purchased a Presque Isle sawmill in 1889. He began to investigate log driving on the Aroostook River as the supply of local logs was exhausted. He needed a railroad to move logs from the river to his sawmill; and recognized the possibility of using the river's water power to generate electricity. The railroad was founded in 1902 and the Maine Railroad Commission granted it approval to operate on 1 July of the same year. Its survey of the planned route was approved the next year, but not until 20 June 1910 was construction completed and the safety certificate approved. The AVR's official opening was on 1 July 1910; at the time it operated 10.8 miles (17.4 km) of track between Presque Isle and Washburn, Maine. In 1911, 11.3 miles (18.2 km) of track was added, extending the line's terminus to New Sweden and in 1912 track was extended to Caribou, a further 7.13 miles (11.47 km). The line was electrified for the early part of the railroad's history.

Gould considered extending the railroad to Lac-Frontière, Quebec through additional sources of timber and electricity, but after the World Wars this plan was dropped. In 1932, the Canadian Pacific Railway acquired a controlling interest in the railroad by buying Gould's share of the company for a price of $225 a share. Passenger service to New Sweden was discontinued in the late 1930s. With the onset of World War II, Presque Isle's airport was converted to a military base for ferrying aircraft to Europe; and the railroad built a 2.5 miles (4.0 km) branch line to handle fuel and equipment shipments to the airfield.

== Traffic ==
The railroad's traffic consisted largely of potatoes. Five thousand carloads were carried in an average year. Other farming products made up the bulk of the rest of early freight traffic, including hay, fertilizer, grain, flour and starch, as well as logs and lumber for Gould's sawmill. During its early years, the railroad made about $60,000 a year from freight traffic, about twice the amount made from passenger service. Passenger travel declined through the 1920s and 1930s. Military freight traffic became significant with the onset of World War II. Military shipments to the airfield were as much as eight or ten carloads per day; and the railroad began carrying passengers in a highway bus to avoid passenger schedule conflicts with expedited military freight shipments. Freight was interchanged with the Bangor and Aroostook Railroad at Washburn, and with the Canadian Pacific at Washburn Junction, near Presque Isle. Inbound heating oil and coal were important car loadings in later years; and a few loads of road salt and farm machinery contributed additional income. The railroad served Skyway Industrial Airpark occupants on the former Presque Isle Air Force Base after the base closed in 1961, including International Paper Company and Indian Head Plywood Company.

== Electric rolling stock ==
Number	Builder	Type	Length	power	Notes
1-10		flatcars		unpowered	wooden cars for carrying logs and lumber
40&41		coaches		unpowered trailers	wooden cars purchased from Quebec Central Railway
50	Brill	22-ton combine	46 feet (14 m)	Brill trucks with 4 GE217 motors	built 1910; seating for 38
51	Brill	22-ton combine	46 feet (14 m)	Brill trucks with 4 GE217 motors	built 1910; seating for 38
52	Brill	box motor	36 feet (11 m)	Brill trucks with 4 GE217 motors	built 1910; equipped with nose plows
53	GE	40-ton steel steeplecab	32 feet (9.8 m)	ALCO trucks with 4 GE205b motors	built 1911; painted black; equipped with nose plows; converted to an unpowered double-ended wedge plow in 1945
54	Westinghouse	60-ton semi-steeplecab	38 feet (12 m)	Baldwin trucks with 4 W582 motors	built 1924; painted black; equipped with nose and wing plows; sold to Cornwall, Ontario street railway in 1945
60-65		15-bench open excursion cars		unpowered trailers	
70	Wason	combine	56.5 feet (17.2 m)	Brill trucks with 4 GE217 motors	built 1913. Preserved at the Seashore Trolley Museum
71	Wason	combine	56.5 feet (17.2 m)	Brill trucks with 4 GE217 motors	built 1913
101		flatcar		unpowered	former Canadian Pacific car
102	Laconia	freight train caboose		unpowered	
103		work train caboose		unpowered	
350		railgrinder		unpowered	former Canadian Pacific 4-wheel caboose

== Diesel era ==
In July 1945, the electrification was ended, and the AVR bought two GE 44-ton switchers numbered 10 and 11. Switcher number 12 was later added in 1949. On 7 August 1945, passenger service on the line was ended. Aside from the three switchers, the railroad operated a caboose, maintenance-of-way flatcar number 101, and converted steeplecab snowplow number 53 through the later years. The flatcar was painted black with white lettering, while the other rolling stock was painted dark blue with yellow lettering and striping. Canadian Pacific MLW S-3 number 6500 worked on the line briefly in 1978 in an attempt to retire the aging 44-ton switchers, but was too heavy for the 70-pound rail.

During the 1970s, the railroad's potato traffic, its major revenue source, dropped, due to Interstate 95's extension to Houlton, Maine, as well as bad crops during this time and the Penn Central Railroad's unreliability in handling potatoes shipped by rail in southern New England. Canadian Pacific sold the railroad in 1980 to an investment group seeking the regulatory advantages of a home railroad for their fleet of leased boxcars. The line north of Washburn was abandoned in 1983.

An April 1987 flood destroyed two Canadian Pacific bridges, causing the AVR to lose its connection with the CP at Washburn Junction. Fewer than 1000 cars were handled on the surviving 10 miles (16 km) of trackage in 1989, and the railroad ended operations in 1996.

== See also ==
- Aroostook Valley Railroad at the Maine Memory Network.
- Aroostook Valley Railroad in the Seashore Trolley Museum (NERHS) Trolley Images Collection at DigitalMaine.
