= Hedley Hi-V (New York City Subway car) =

Retired class of New York City Subway car

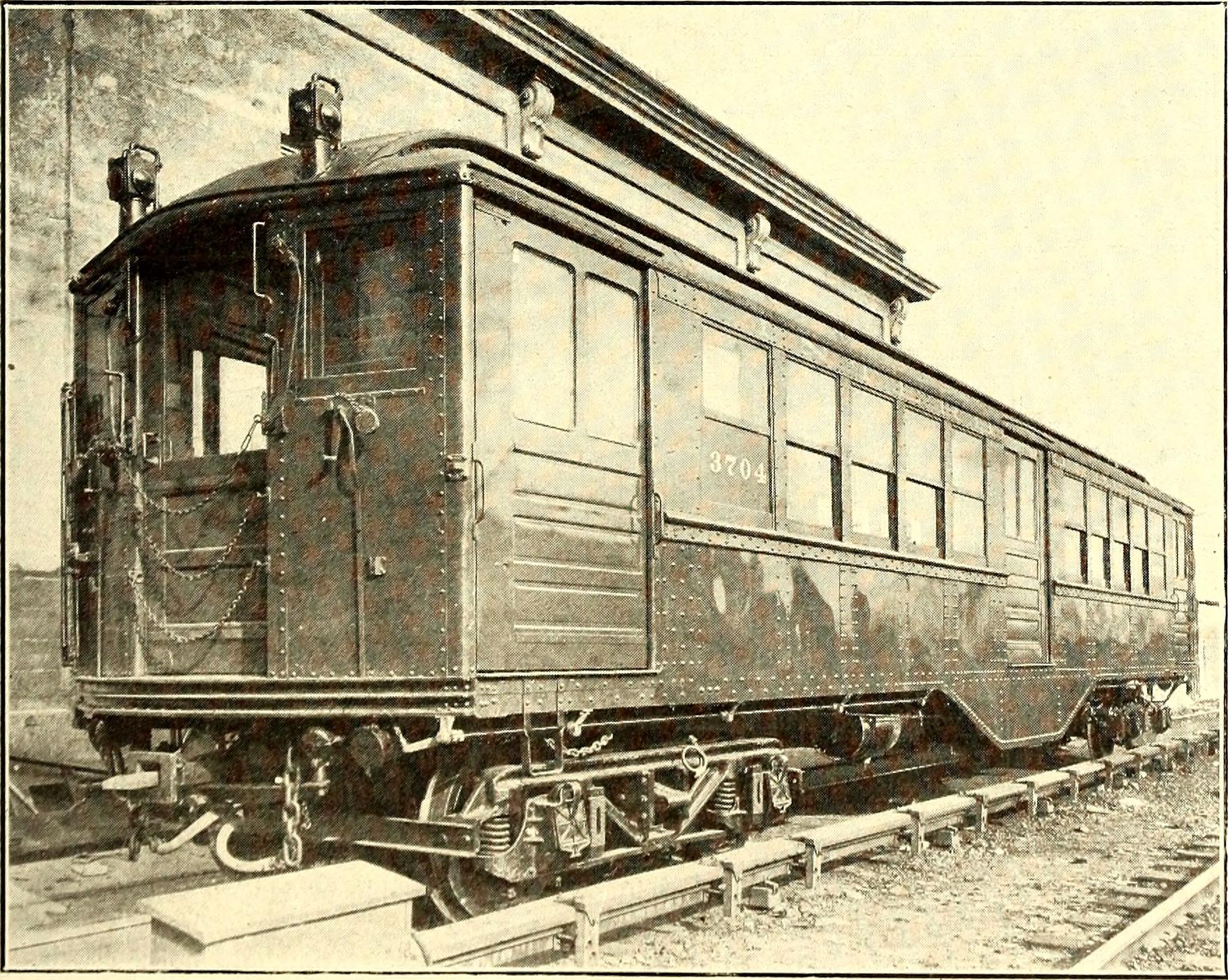
- A Hedley Hi-V car in 1910
- Manufacturers: American Car and Foundry, Standard Steel, Pressed Steel Car Company, Pullman
- Constructed: 1910–1911, 1915
- Scrapped: 1955–1961
- Number built: 617
- Number preserved: 0
- Number scrapped: 617
- Successor: R17; R21; R22
- Formation: Singles
- Fleet numbers: 3700–4024, 4223–4514
- Operators: Interborough Rapid Transit Company; NYC Board of Transportation; New York City Transit Authority

Specifications
- Car body construction: Riveted Steel
- Car length: 51 ft 1.5 in (15.58 m)
- Width: 8 ft 10 in (2,692 mm)
- Height: 12 ft 0 in (3,658 mm)
- Doors: Up until the early 1910s: 4 After the 1910s: 6
- Maximum speed: 55 mph (89 km/h)
- Traction system: 2 motors per motor car
- Power output: 200 hp (149 kW) per traction motor
- Electric systems: 600 V DC third rail
- Current collection: Top running contact shoe
- Braking systems: Before 1910: WABCO Schedule AM(P) with 'P' type triple valve and M-2 brake stand After 1910: WABCO Schedule AMRE with 'R' type triple valve and ME-21 brake stand
- Track gauge: 4 ft 8 1/2 in (1,435 mm)

The Hedley Hi-V was a New York City Subway car class built from 1910 to 1911, which were motor cars, and then in 1915 an order for trailers that were numbered 4223–4514. All were built by the American Car and Foundry, Standard Steel Car Company, Pressed Steel Car Company, and Pullman Company. These were the first cars built with center doors. They were also the last high voltage cars built for the system because high voltage cars were a hazard to both the train operators and track crews. Thus, all subway cars delivered afterward were low voltage cars.

== Service history ==
The order for Hedley High-V motors consisted of 325 cars, with 110 built by American Car and Foundry, 40 by Standard Steel and 175 by Pressed Steel.

As delivered, the Hedley High-V motors were the first cars to be delivered with center doors on the sides, with all side seats to provide for them; the facing cross seats of previous cars being eliminated. They were also the first with advanced couplers and an AMRE triple valve braking system. The older Gibbs and Deck Roof cars were retrofitted with these. As with the previous Gibbs and Deck Roof cars, they drew their motor equipment from the Composites that were being converted to trailers; however, many of these cars received new motors to enable them to enter service faster.

Most of these cars were converted to MUDC operation in 1923 (roughly 268 cars); however, that left about half of the American Car and Foundry group still with hand-operated doors as well as one each from the Standard Steel and Pressed Steel groups.

These cars ran mainly on both the West Side and Broadway–7th Ave. Lines and ran with both the Gibbs and Deck Roof High-V cars until being replaced by the R17, R21, and R22 cars. 64 of these cars were used in Pelham–Lenox services, and the last 10 were reserved for the 42nd St. Shuttle. These latter two groups were equipped with the center door cutout feature and indicated by a white line painted under the number outside as an instruction to keep these cars assigned to such services operating to South Ferry, City Hall, and certain shuttle services. The High-V Hedleys were retired by 1958 along with what was left of both the High-V Gibbs and High-V Deck Roofs, which were in very small numbers by that point. Several cars were used in work service until 1960 before getting scrapped. Cars 3712 and 3737 were used as welding cars. 3700–3701 became work motors, while 4267 was a pay car from the very beginning, having never been used in passenger service. The Hedley's standard car body would be incorporated into another fleet of cars known as the Low-V fleet, which were built from 1915 to 1925. Car 3938 sported a robin egg blue interior paint scheme during the late 1940s.

In 1915, as part of the Dual Contracts expansion, the Composites were completely rebuilt for expanded el service, with new motors, new trucks, and an improved low voltage operating system with the newest AMUE type braking, which was quickly becoming the industry standard. Therefore, it was necessary to order a new run of cars to serve as trailers in place of the Composites.

A run of 478 car bodies were ordered from Pullman, numbered 4037–4514, to be placed on the old Composite trucks. The cars were built with rudimentary skeleton cabs as a provision for these cars to be converted to motors, as actually took place with a number of these. However, after ordering this equipment, the IRT found itself left with 124 old Composite motors from cars that had never been converted to trailers. The question immediately arose what to do with these motors. The IRT was reluctant to revert to the older high voltage control system, having successfully used low voltage equipment in their recently put-into-service 12 Steinway Low-V motors for their initial Queens operation, as well as the fleet of rebuilt Composites just transferred to the elevated lines. It is also possible that high voltage control systems were no longer available, even though they ordered AMRE equipment for the entire run of cars under the assumption that it would be a clear run of High-V trailers. They rather ended up with a hybrid type car, using an AMRE braking system but operating as a low voltage car, which subsequently received the type name of Flivvers, the fleet of which consisted of 124 motors and 62 trailers. These were covered under the heading for those cars.

292 of this run of cars served as trailers for the High-Vs. Car 4267 served as a pay car from the very beginning and was never in passenger service. 133 of these cars were converted to MUDC in 1923, and the remainder were converted in 1936. A year later, in 1937, several of these cars were furnished with the center door cutout feature, and this was intended for consists used on Broadway Local service whose motor cars were not equipped with this feature. Even with this provision, however, all trailers could be freely used in all High-V consists regardless of which assigned fleet of cars.

In 1952, 20 older hand-operated motor cars were scrapped. Their motors were transferred into an equivalent number of trailers to be operated as blind motors or motorized trailers, indicated by a red M next to the number inside as well as outside of the car. This took place with an additional 8 cars in 1955, at which point the city put an end to this program, being that new cars were already on order. The last of these cars were retired in 1958. Three of the blind motors: 4223, 4230, 4237, served briefly in work service after having been retired from passenger service. None of the Hedleys were saved, as it was not thought of at the time to preserve for future generations, although car 3700 was briefly considered for this purpose.
