= R17 (New York City Subway car) =

Retired class of New York City Subway car

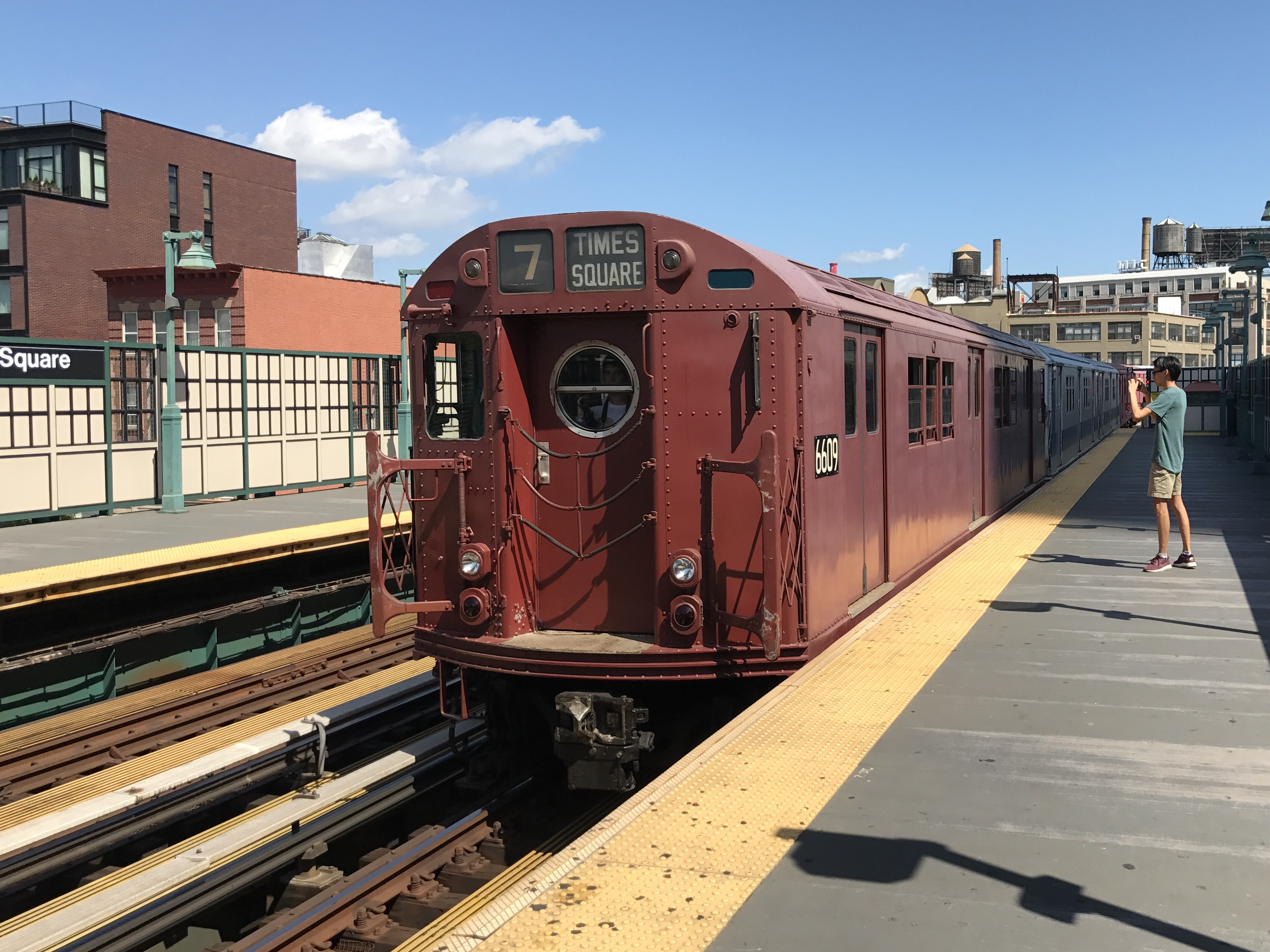
- R17 car 6609 at Court Square on the Train of Many Colors

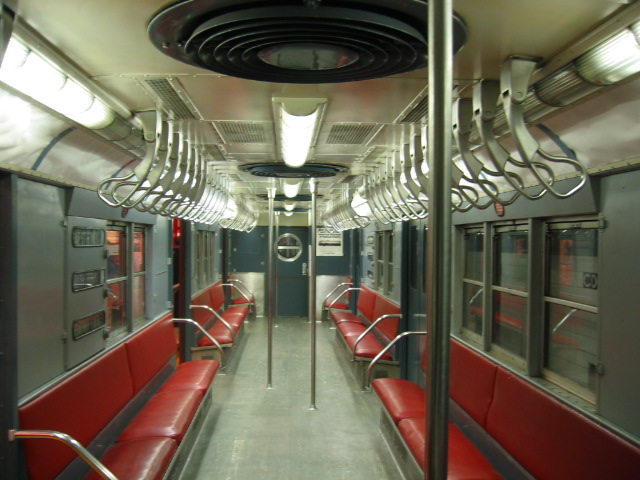
- Interior view of R17 car 6609
- In service: October 10, 1955 – February 29, 1988 (32 years)
- Manufacturer: St. Louis Car Company
- Built at: St. Louis, Missouri
- Replaced: All Gibbs Hi-Vs; All Deck Roof Hi-Vs; All Hedley Hi-Vs
- Constructed: 1954–1956
- Entered service: October 10, 1955
- Number built: 400
- Number in service: (2 in work service)
- Number preserved: 2
- Number scrapped: 396; 395; 1 in storage
- Successor: R62A
- Formation: Single unit cars
- Fleet numbers: 6500–6699 (General Electric); 6700–6899 (Westinghouse)
- Capacity: 44 (seated)
- Operator: New York City Transit Authority

Specifications
- Car body construction: LAHT Carbon steel
- Car length: 51 ft 0 1/2 in (15.56 m)
- Width: 8 ft 10 3/16 in (2,697 mm)
- Height: 11 ft 10 in (3,607 mm)
- Floor height: 3 ft 9 in (1.14 m)
- Doors: 6 sets of 50 inch wide side doors per car
- Maximum speed: 55 mph (89 km/h)
- Weight: General Electric cars: 77,887 lb (35,329 kg); Westinghouse cars: 79,193 lb (35,921 kg)
- Traction system: General Electric cars: GE MCM 17KG137D1, with 17KC76A1 master controller Westinghouse cars: WH Unit Switch UPC-631B, with XM-179 master controller, using Air Compressor: WABCO 2-C-Y
- Traction motors: GE 1240-A4 motors (100 hp per axle). 4 motors per car (2 per truck), WH 1447C motors (100 hp per axle). 4 motors per car (2 per truck).
- Power output: 100 hp (75 kW) per traction motor
- Electric systems: 600 V DC third rail
- Current collection: Top running contact shoe
- Braking systems: WABCO Schedule SMEE with A-1 Application package, J1 relay valve, ME-42A brake stand, and A.S.F simplex unit cylinder clasp brake rigging
- Safety system: Tripcock
- Coupling system: Westinghouse H2C
- Track gauge: 4 ft 8 1/2 in (1,435 mm)

The R17 was a New York City Subway car model built by the St. Louis Car Company in 1954 for the IRT A Division. A total of 400 cars were built, arranged as single units. Two versions were manufactured: Westinghouse (WH)-powered cars and General Electric (GE)-powered cars.

The first R17s entered service on October 10, 1955. Originally painted maroon red, the R17s subsequently received several different paint schemes, including bright red, platinum mist/blue, or plain white. The R17s were replaced by the R62As in the 1980s, and the final train of R17s ran on February 29, 1988. Some R17 cars were saved for various purposes, but most were scrapped.

== Description ==
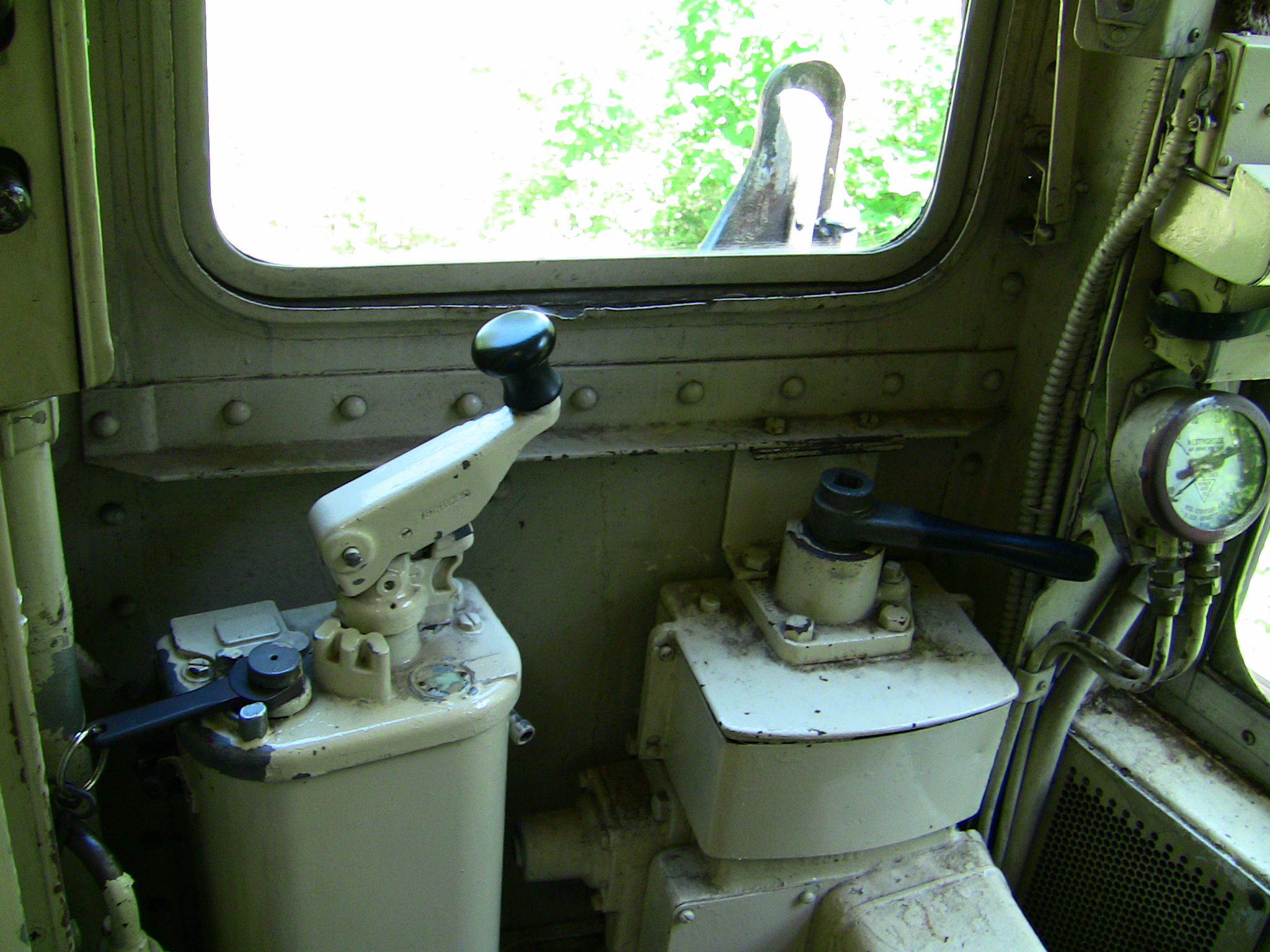
Operator's cab of R17 car 6688 at the Shore Line Trolley Museum

The R17s were selectively numbered 6500–6899. They were one of three car classes purchased in the mid-1950s by the New York City Transit Authority to replace much of the pre-World War II IRT High-Voltage (Hi-V) rolling stock, which included the Gibbs cars, the Deck Roofs, and the Hedley Hi-V cars. The cars were single unit cars capable of operating both independently or as part of a longer train.

There were two versions of the R17: General Electric-powered cars (6500–6699) and Westinghouse Electric-powered cars (6700–6899).

Cars 6800–6809 were factory equipped with air conditioning when delivered. However, the air conditioning experiment was considered a failure, and the cars were refitted with standard axiflow fans between 1962 and 1964.

As delivered, R17s came with low-running lights and very comfortable foam rubber seats. In 1957, sealed beam headlights were added to the cars. Additionally, vandalism and wear & tear contributed to rapid and frequent damage to the original seats, leading the Transit Authority to replace the seats with hard fiberglass benches similar in feel to the ones in use on New York City subway trains today.

While the cars received the fox red paint scheme like other cars that would go on to be later known as "Redbirds", that nickname was never given to these cars. The only nickname for the R17s was "Flat bottoms", which was given to the GE-powered cars by shop and operating personnel. The name was derived from the large box underneath the car that contained the switch group, resistor grids, and other propulsion control electrical equipment. Designed to simplify maintenance, in practice, the heavy box proved unwieldy. Resistance grids also generate a good deal of heat and therefore need to be cooled. Typically, this is done automatically on a subway car that uses a DC propulsion system, as the grids are exposed, and the train's natural movement creates a breeze that ventilates and cools the grids. But since the R17's grids were enclosed in the heavy box, ventilation and cooling would be provided by using the spinning rotor of the motor-generator to act as a fan feeding air into the box. The GE R17s were not the only subway cars with this arrangement. The GE-powered R16s, R21s, and R22s had a similar setup, and therefore the "Flat bottom" nickname applies to the GE cars in those classes as well for the same reason as above. The nickname never applied to the Westinghouse cars in either class. The GE cars built and delivered after the R22s have eliminated this unfortunate system, and reverted to the former exterior-mounted grids that are exposed as the train's natural movement creates a breeze that ventilates and cooled the grids starting with the R26s cars in 1959.

The major identifying characteristics of the R17 can all be found in its windows. These include the circular windows on the car end doors, similar to those found on the R15 and the B Division R11 and R16. The R17 also features large, rounded rectangle windows on its side doors, similar to those found on nearly every car in today's subway system. While similar to the R16 in outward appearance, as an A Division car, it is smaller and contains only three doors on each side of the car (instead of four). Side windows are of a two-pane, pull-down drop sash type (used until the Main Line R36s).

The R17, like many older New York City Subway cars built for the A Division, also features two sets of mid-car body passenger windows on each side. Normally arranged in two pairs of three on the R15, on the R17, one set of windows on each side contains a rollsign in lieu of a third window. The sign contains three readings arranged vertically on its box – the top two being the train's terminals, and the bottom being the train's route. This window and signbox pattern, first appearing on the R16, became the blueprint for the later R21 and R22, the Redbirds, and even influenced the design of trains still in service today.

Car 6812 was repainted with a gold exterior scheme with a view of being used in the Fifth Avenue Association's 50th Anniversary Parade; however, the car was withdrawn in favor of R22 7526.

Car 6552 received a speckled green interior paint scheme during the early 60s.

== History ==
The first consist of R17s were placed in service on the 6 line on October 10, 1955. All 400 cars were delivered by January 1956. Between 1959 and 1960, with the delivery of the R26s and R28s, the G.E.-equipped R17s were transferred to the West Side Lines and became part of the R21/22 fleet. On November 1, 1962, fifty cars (6500–6549) were transferred from the Mainline IRT to the Flushing Line, allowing for ten-car operation on the 7 line. Shortly thereafter, an additional thirty cars (6550–6577, 6580 and 6581) were transferred to augment this service.

The R17s were delivered in a maroon paint scheme. Some were repainted bright red ("tartar red") in the late 1960s. All cars received the TA sliver/blue paint job starting in 1970. In the early 1980s, they were painted plain white, and eventually, 16 cars were repainted fox red for 42nd Street Shuttle service in 1985–86. All 16 of the fox red cars were sent to the Flushing Line to fill in for the R33 singles while they were being overhauled. The red R17s were the last to remain in service, running on the 5 line and being mixed with both rebuilt and unrebuilt R26–R33 cars.

During the course of their careers, two cars (6673 and 6786) were wrecked in 1957 as a result of a collision near Zerega Avenue, and three cars (6595, 6597, and 6601) were all destroyed by a fire that took place at Grand Central on the 42nd Street Shuttle platform on April 21, 1964.

=== Retirement ===
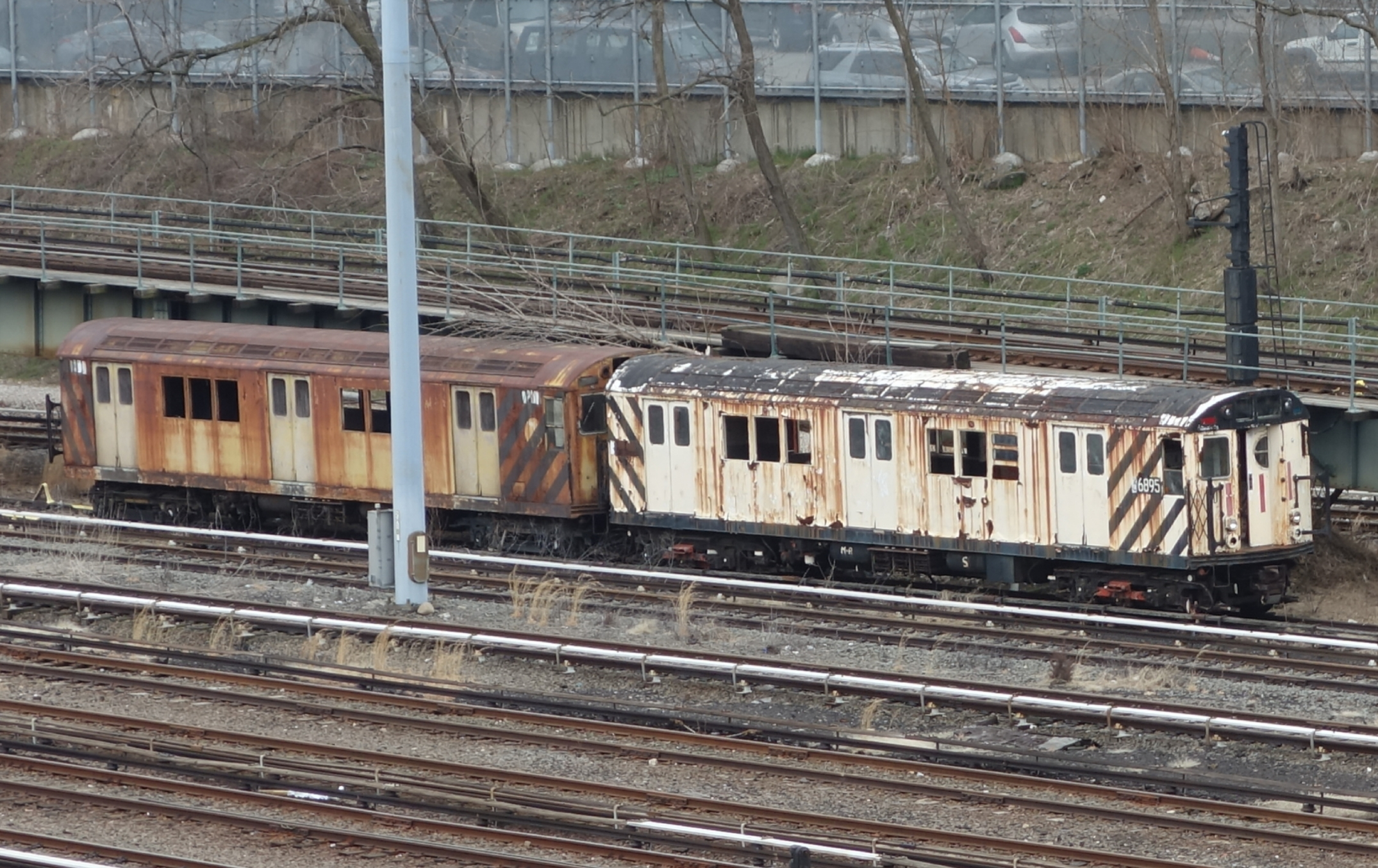
6895 (renumbered to 36895) at the Concourse Yard with R21 7267 (renumbered to G7267), both awaiting scrapping

The R17s were replaced by the R62As, as they had reached the end of their planned service lives. The final train of R17s ran on February 29, 1988 on the 42nd Street Shuttle.

The majority of the remainder of the fleet was scrapped, but some R17 cars were saved for various purposes throughout the New York City Subway system, including:

- Car 6609 – restored in 1976 and preserved by the New York Transit Museum. It is fully operational, periodically displayed at the Transit Museum in Brooklyn, and runs periodically on museum-sponsored "Nostalgia Trains", specifically on the Train of Many Colors. The car is currently in storage at the Coney Island Yard in Brooklyn. The number plates for the car were removed sometime in 2024.
- Car 6688 – preserved at the Shore Line Trolley Museum in East Haven, Connecticut. It is fully operational, though modified with trolley poles, and runs frequently during the summer months for rapid transit themed programming.
- Cars 6835 and 6899 survive as work service cars, converted to R71 hose reach cars, and overhauled under the R159 program.

Car 6895 (renumbered to 36895) is currently in storage at Concourse Yard with R21 7267 (renumbered G7267) and has not moved since 2002. This car is still classified as a work car and was used on a special trip sometime during the 1990s. Although it was reported that the cars may be operational and preserved, the car was stripped of parts in 2009 (such as sash windows and rollsigns). Both cars still remain, but are awaiting scrapping.

Car 6762 was converted to an R71 rider car after retirement, but was replaced with R161s (R33s converted into rider cars) in the mid-2000s and eventually reefed.

Cars 6813 and 6850 were converted to R123 continuous welded rail holder cars for set DCR and overhauled under the R128 program, but were replaced with R157 flat cars in the 2010s and eventually scrapped.

== In film ==
Cars 6671 and 6609 were featured at Grand Central Terminal in the 1971 film The French Connection in a scene where Gene Hackman's character is tailing a heroin smuggler. At that time, the cars were painted in the MTA platinum mist/blue band livery.

R17s can be seen on the 42nd Street Shuttle in Ron Howard's Night Shift (1982).

White painted (though clean) R17s on the Shuttle appear in a scene of Mike Nichols' Heartburn (1986) with Meryl Streep and Kevin Spacey, with cars 6699 and 6550. The shuttle platform at Grand Central was doubling for the Christopher Street Station on the 1.

The interior of a repainted red R17 operating on the 5 train can be briefly seen in the opening credits of Oliver Stone's Wall Street (1987).

A decommissioned R17 is featured in the film Mimic as the escape vehicle for the film's protagonists.

Car 6688, which belongs to the Shore Line Trolley Museum, appears in the 2014 film The Amazing Spider-Man 2 as well as the 2019 film Joker.
