= Gibbs Hi-V (New York City Subway car) =

Retired class of New York City Subway car

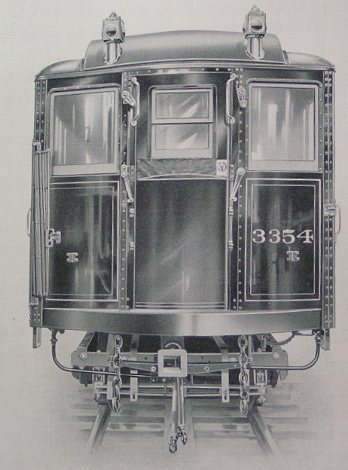
- 1904 Rendering of an IRT Gibbs Hi-V
- Manufacturer: American Car and Foundry
- Replaced: 1958
- Constructed: 1904–1905
- Number built: 300
- Number preserved: 1
- Number scrapped: 299
- Successor: R17; R21; R22
- Formation: Singles
- Fleet numbers: 3350–3649
- Operators: Interborough Rapid Transit Company; NYC Board of Transportation; New York City Transit Authority

Specifications
- Car body construction: Riveted Steel
- Car length: 51 feet 1.5 inches (15.58 m)
- Width: 8 feet 10 inches (2,692 mm)
- Height: 12 feet 0 inches (3,658 mm)
- Doors: Before 1909–1912: 4 After: 6
- Maximum speed: 55 mph (89 km/h)
- Weight: Motor car: ~89,450 lb (40,570 kg); Trailer car: ~
- Traction system: Motor car: GE69; WH86, 2 motors per car (both on motor truck, trailer truck not motorized). Trailer car: None
- Power output: 200 hp (149 kW) per traction motor
- Electric systems: 600 V DC third rail
- Current collection: Top running contact shoe
- Braking systems: Before 1910: WABCO Schedule AM(P) with 'P' type triple valve and M-2 brake stand After 1910: WABCO Schedule AMRE with 'R' type triple valve and ME-21 brake stand
- Track gauge: 4 ft 8 1/2 in (1,435 mm)

The Gibbs Hi-V was a New York City Subway car class built from 1904 to 1905 by American Car and Foundry for the IRT and its successors, the New York City Board of Transportation and the New York City Transit Authority. It was the first all-steel subway car ordered for New York City.

Because of the sliding doors which enclosed the motorman's vestibules from the rest of the car compartment, the cars were nicknamed Merry Widows. Early on, they were also known as Battleships, a reference to their second paint scheme where the siding was painted Battleship Grey. However, the nickname did not stick and was later given to the Deck Roof Hi-V cars, which were painted the same color. Today, references to the "Battleships" are generally assumed to be in reference to the Deck Roof cars, as opposed to the Gibbs cars.

== Background information ==
As the Interborough Rapid Transit Company's subway line was the first attempt at an underground rapid transit, the IRT and chief engineer George Gibbs felt compelled to develop a subway car that would be stronger and safer than any previously designed railway cars. This inevitably led them to the conclusion that it would be best to design an all-steel car to run in the new tunnels.

However, car manufacturers of the time were unwilling to undertake such an experimental proposition. Steel was deemed too heavy for any practical applications. The conventional wisdom of the day (since proven to be false) held that an all-steel car would vibrate itself to pieces, for wood was "necessary" for its damping effects on the car's vibration. It was also widely believed that a steel car would be very loud, and poorly insulated from temperature extremes such as heat and cold. With a large backlog of orders for wooden cars, manufacturers had no incentive to explore the new technology as there was still plenty of demand for wooden railcars. The IRT knew that the 1904 opening of the new subway route was fast approaching and that rolling stock had to be designed and built soon or the line would not be ready. With time running short to order rolling stock, a protected wooden alternative known as a Composite had been designed and ordered. But that did not stop Gibbs from his pursuit of an all-steel subway car.

== The all-steel prototype ==
In 1903, George Gibbs used his influence to contract with the Pennsylvania Railroad's shops in Altoona to build an all-steel prototype for the new subway. This car, numbered 3342, was tested in February 1904 and deemed to be too heavy for practical use in the new subway. It required further design changes before it could become serviceable. But most importantly, the all-steel prototype proved that an all-steel car could be feasible, and validated Gibbs' claims that the previously held fears of excessive vibration, poor insulation, and loud noise were unfounded. IRT engineers began modifying the all-steel design to lighten the cars to a more suitable weight. One of the largest breakthroughs came when engineers learned they could achieve a similar structural strength as the heavier car by constructing a "skeleton" floor frame made of thick, intersecting steel sills and crossmembers. This was in contrast to using a single thick, heavy sheet of steel for a large center sill that supported the car. Following this and other weight-reducing changes, the IRT was ready to go ahead with a production order of the new "Gibbs" cars, named after George Gibbs. Larger builders remained steadfast in their refusal to build all-steel cars. However, as a result of the generally successful introduction of the steel prototype car, the growing American Car & Foundry was willing to accept an order for steel cars. Three hundred were to be constructed, incorporating the latest modifications made by Gibbs and IRT engineers to reduce the weight of the cars. As it turned out, 200 of these cars were initially built, with an additional 100 as a supplementary order. The latter differed slightly from the base order by having aluminum trim on their roofs.

As they were being placed in service, many motors from the Composite cars were transferred to these cars. However, to speed the process of placing these cars in service to ready them for the subway's opening, many of the Gibbs cars had newly ordered motors.

In 1910–11, center doors were added to these cars, and the facing cross seats in the center, typical of el cars, were removed to accommodate the additional doors. Additionally, the cars were retrofitted with a more advanced type coupler, and the AMRE triple valve braking which was first introduced in the later Hedley High-V motor cars.

At this time, 8 of these cars: 3376, 3386, 3447, 3514, 3524, 3567, 3591, and 3638 were set aside for work service and were not modified (see below). 3350 was retired from service in 1930 and became a pay car, stationed at Corona Yard. The sample steel car, 3342, also served as a pay car, converted in 1905.

== Service history ==
In 1937, a huge consolidation of the High-V fleet occurred, which set an assignment for these cars.

First of all, to facilitate the operation of cars that still had hand-operated door systems with those that had been converted to MUDC operation in combination trains, as such consists were referred to, more cars had to be converted to MUDC. These consisted of 133 Gibbs cars, and the rest of the trailers, the first batch of which had been converted in 1923 along with around 268 Hedley motor cars.

Next, the High-V fleet was divided into three groups: for Pelham and Lenox Local service, Broadway service, and shuttle service. Cars in the Broadway Local service were enabled to use the Pelham–Lenox cars for the purpose. The motor cars were equipped with a center door cutout feature and were distinguishable by a white line painted outside under the number. This indicated that these cars were intended to be used in services that operated to South Ferry, City Hall, and shuttle services such as the 42nd St. and Bowling Green–South Ferry Shuttle. Broadway Local trains sharing the Broadway Express service cars that were not equipped with this feature had special trailer cars assigned for the purpose.

In 1942, car 3583 was involved in an accident and scrapped. Fortunately, the MUDC equipment from this car was salvaged. The economy-minded Board of Transportation took one of eight work cars set aside from this fleet in its early years, 3514 (the other seven are listed above). The car was converted back to passenger service, equipped with MUDC, and added the white line outside for the assigned service.

Gibbs High-Vs were used on the first subway line since 1904 and ran until 1958. They were primarily used in local service on the subway until 1952, when an equipment exchange to save on crews put many of these cars in the IRT Broadway–Seventh Avenue–Van Cortlandt Park 242nd St. Express service as well. 3342 was scrapped in 1956. All other work cars were retired and scrapped by 1960 as surplus Low-V cars entered work service. All hand-operated cars were removed from passenger service in 1957, and MUDC cars in 1958. They were replaced by the R17, R21, and R22 subway cars.

Car 3352 has been preserved at the Seashore Trolley Museum in Kennebunkport, Maine, and was restored back to its 1904 appearance. It is modified with trolley poles and in running condition, though it is not run often.
