= R21 (New York City Subway car) =

Retired class of New York City Subway car

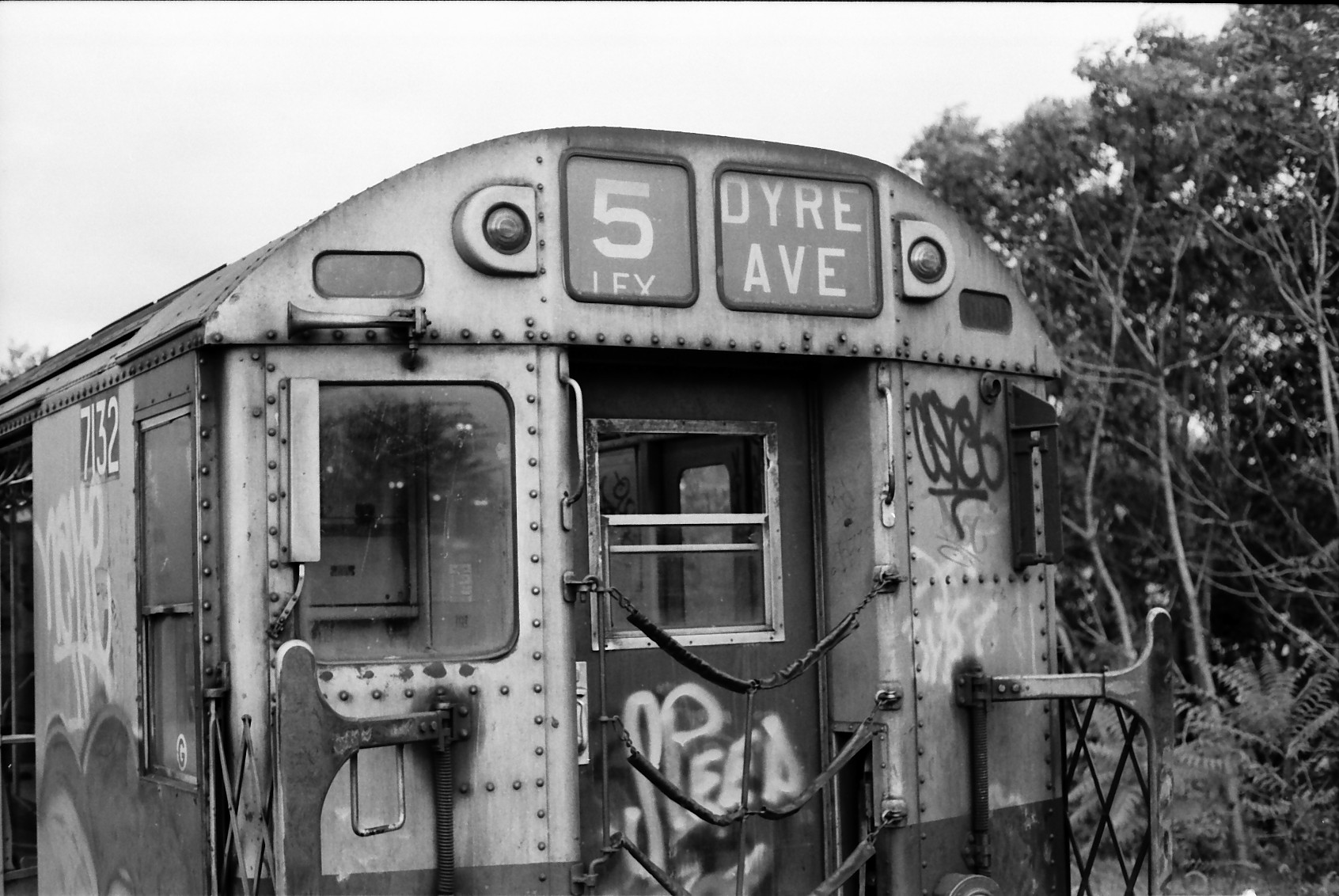
- Graffiti-covered 7132 on the 5
- In service: November 7, 1956 – December 30, 1987 (31 years)
- Manufacturer: St. Louis Car Company
- Built at: St. Louis, Missouri
- Replaced: All Gibbs Hi-Vs; All Deck Roof Hi-Vs; All Hedley Hi-Vs
- Constructed: 1956–1957
- Number built: 250
- Number in service: (2 in work service)
- Number preserved: 2
- Number scrapped: 246; 245 scrapped 1 in storage
- Successor: R62A
- Formation: Single unit cars
- Fleet numbers: 7050–7174 (General Electric); 7175–7299 (Westinghouse)
- Capacity: 44 (seated)
- Operator: New York City Transit Authority

Specifications
- Car body construction: LAHT Carbon steel
- Car length: 51 ft 0.5 in (15.56 m)
- Width: 8 ft 9 in (2,667 mm)
- Height: 11 ft 10 in (3,607 mm)
- Doors: 6 sets of 50 inch wide side doors per car
- Maximum speed: 55 mph (89 km/h)
- Weight: General Electric cars: 77,607 lb (35,202 kg); Westinghouse cars: 78,604 lb (35,654 kg)
- Traction system: Westinghouse 1447C or General Electric 1240A4
- Power output: 100 hp (75 kW) per traction motor
- Electric systems: 600 V DC third rail
- Current collection: Top running Contact shoe
- Braking system: WABCO ME42A
- Safety system: Tripcock
- Track gauge: 4 ft 8 1/2 in (1,435 mm) standard gauge

The R21 was a New York City Subway car built by St. Louis Car Company from 1956 to 1957 for the IRT A Division. A total of 250 cars were built, arranged as single units. Two versions were manufactured: Westinghouse (WH)-powered cars and General Electric (GE)-powered cars.

The first R21s entered service on November 7, 1956. The R21s were replaced by the R62As in the 1980s, and the final train of R21s ran on December 30, 1987. Four R21 cars were preserved, while the rest were scrapped.

== Description ==
The R21s were numbered 7050–7299. They were similar to the R17s, except that they featured windows of a slightly different design. The cab doors were mounted the same way as the newer R62 and R62A subway cars; however, this was not repeated on the next order for R22 subway cars, which reverted to the normally mounted cab doors.

There were two versions of the R21: Westinghouse Electric-powered cars (7050–7174) and General Electric-powered cars (7175–7299).

== History ==
The first set of R21s was placed in service on the 1 train on November 7, 1956, replacing most of the IRT "high-voltage" type cars. They ran in service for most of their service lives on the IRT Broadway–Seventh Avenue Line, but some cars were sent to the IRT Lexington Avenue Line in later years.

=== Retirement ===
The incoming R62A fleet began replacing the R21s in the 1980s. The R21 fleet subsequently retired on December 30, 1987 on the 5 line along with the R22s.

The majority of the fleet was scrapped, but some R21s have been set aside for preservation over the years, including:

- 7194 – converted to R95 revenue collection car 0R714. The car was retired in 2006 and is now preserved by the New York Transit Museum. This car is currently the only operating R21 on MTA property.
- 7203 – rebuilt as the "money train" in the 1995 American crime thriller film Money Train by Columbia Pictures, and given the car number designation 51050. After production, this car was donated to the New York Transit Museum. It is currently in storage at the Coney Island Complex.

As of 2016, two other R21s survive as work cars, including:

- 7121 – converted to R71 hose reach car P7121 and overhauled under the R159 program.
- 7287 – converted to R71 de-icer car RD345 and overhauled under the R159 program. This car is currently located at the Westchester Yard.

Car 7267 (renumbered G7267) is currently at Concourse Yard coupled up to R17 6895 (renumbered 36895) and is classified as a garbage motor. The mechanical condition of 7267 is unknown, and both cars have not been moved since 2002. In 2009, both cars were stripped of parts, such as sash windows and rollsigns, and are now awaiting scrapping.

Cars 7234, 7241, 7269, 7276, and 7287 were converted to R71 rider cars after retirement, but were replaced with R161s (R33s converted to rider cars) in the mid-2000s and eventually reefed.

Cars 7055, 7210, 7211, 7243, 7278, 7289, and 7296 were converted to R123 continuous welded rail holder cars for set CCR and overhauled under the R128 program, but were replaced with R157 flat cars in the 2010s and eventually scrapped.

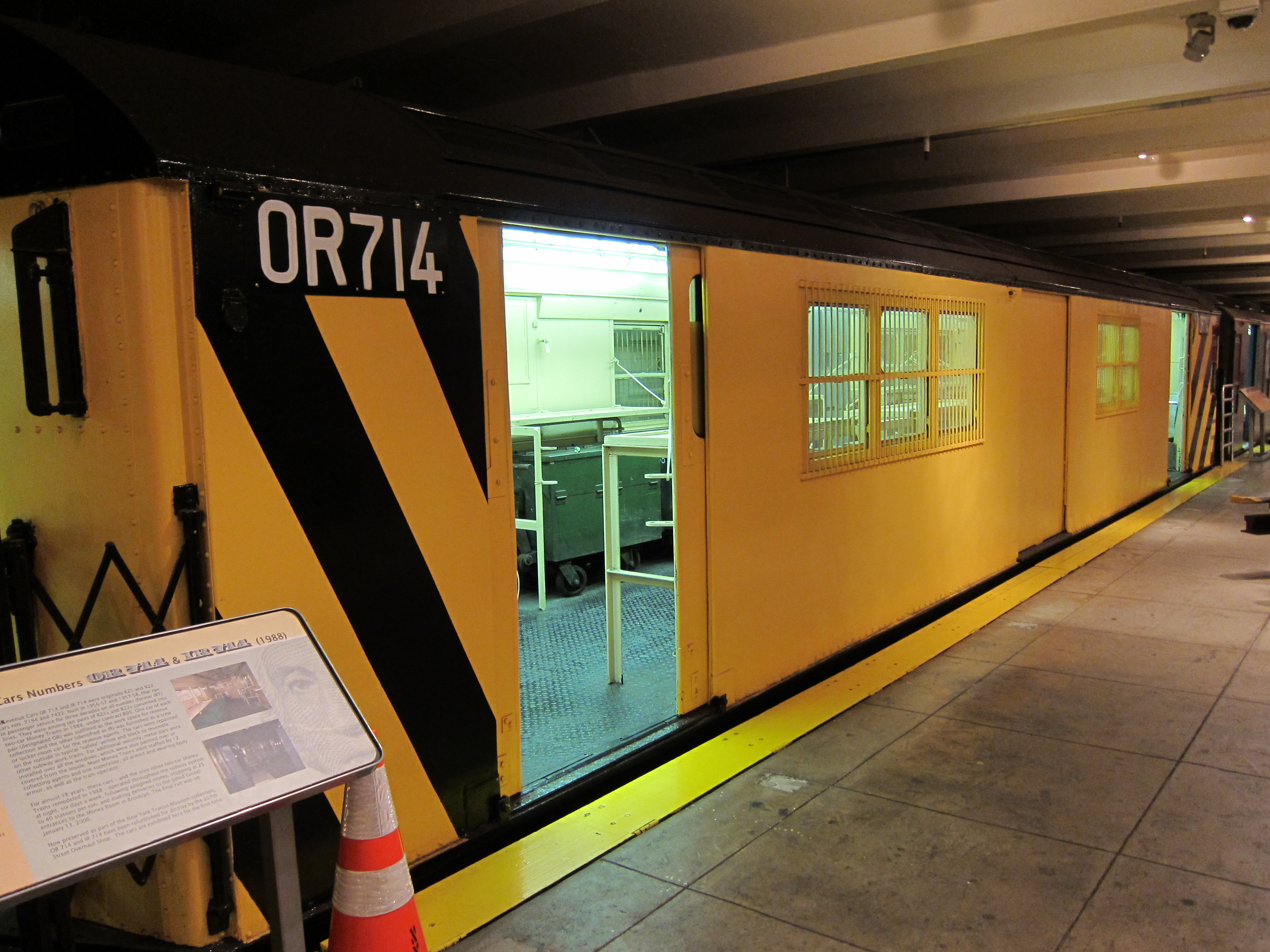
Car 0R714 on display at the New York Transit Museum

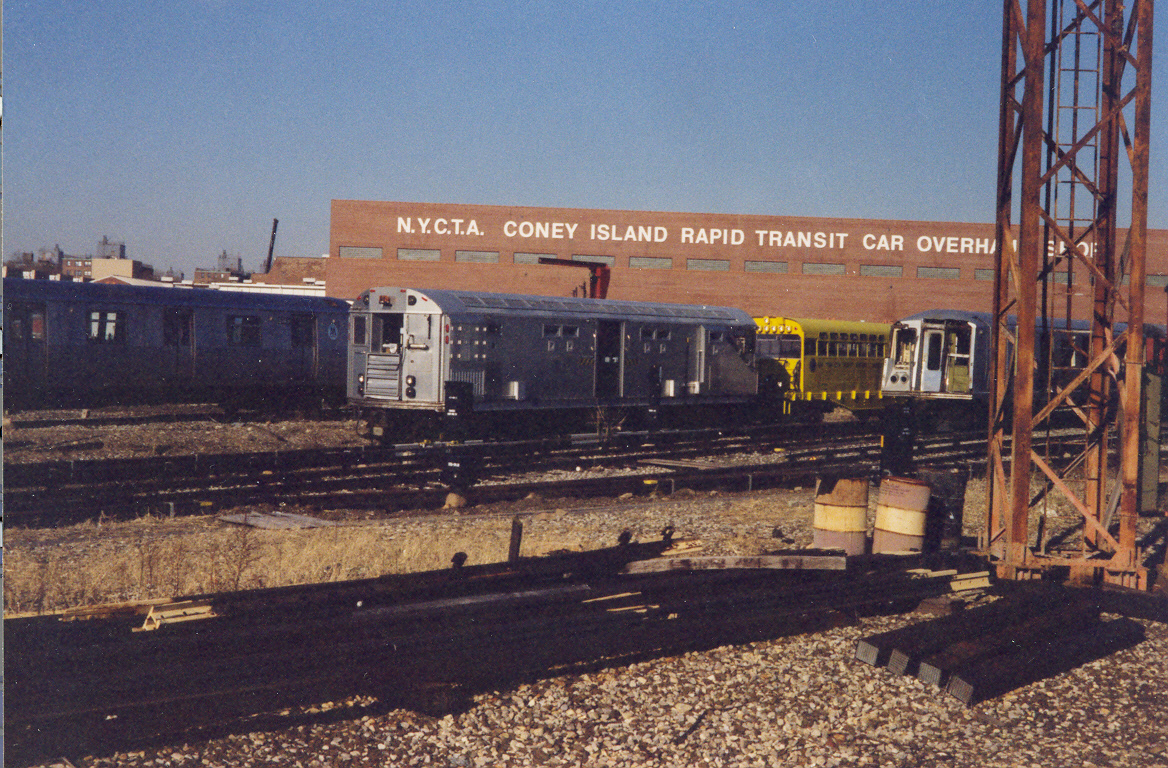
Car 7203, rebuilt for use in the film Money Train and numbered 51050
