= Composite (New York City Subway car) =

Retired class of New York City Subway car

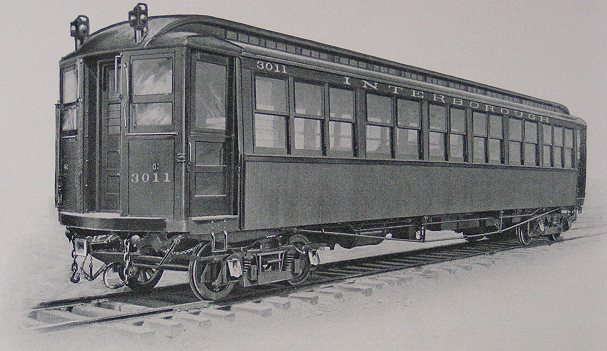
- 1904 Rendering of an IRT Composite
- Manufacturers: Jewett Car Company; St. Louis Car Company; Wason Manufacturing Company; John Stephenson Company
- Constructed: 1903–1904
- Entered service: 1904
- Refurbished: 1916
- Scrapped: 1950–1953
- Number built: 500
- Number preserved: 0
- Number scrapped: 500
- Fleet numbers: 2000–2059 (Jewett trailers); 2060–2119 (St. Louis Car trailers); 2120–2159 (Wason trailers); 3000–3039 (Jewett motors); 3040–3139 (Stephenson motors); 3140–3279 (St. Louis Car motors); 3280–3339 (Wason motors)
- Capacity: Before 1909–1912: 162: 52 (seated) 110 (standing); After: 162: 44 (seated) 118 (standing)
- Operators: Interborough Rapid Transit Company; NYC Board of Transportation

Specifications
- Car body construction: Wood with copper sheathing
- Car length: 51 feet 1.5 inches (15.58 m)
- Width: 8 feet 11.375 inches (2,727 mm)
- Height: 12 feet 1.375 inches (3,693 mm)
- Floor height: 3 ft 2.5 in (0.98 m)
- Doors: Before 1909–1912: 4 After: 6
- Maximum speed: 55 mph (89 km/h)
- Weight: Motor car (before 1916): ~81,600 lb (37,000 kg) (after): 73,788 lb (33,470 kg); Trailer car (before 1916): ~60,000 lb (27,000 kg) (Note all trailer cars were converted to motor cars in 1916)
- Traction system: Motor car (before 1916): Westinghouse Type 'M' switch group, using GE 69 or Westinghouse 86 motors (200 hp or 150 kW each). Two motors per car (both on motor truck, trailer truck not motorized). Motor car (after 1916): GE PC type switch group, using GE 259 motors (120 hp or 89 kW each). Two motors per car (one on each truck). Trailer car (before 1916): None (Note all trailer cars were converted to motor cars in 1916)
- Power output: Before 1916: 200 hp (149 kW) per traction motor After 1916: 120 hp (89 kW) per traction motor
- Electric systems: 600 V DC third rail
- Current collection: Top running contact shoe
- Braking systems: Before 1910: WABCO Schedule AM(P) with 'P' type triple valve and M-2 brake stand 1910–1916: WABCO Schedule AMRE with 'R' type triple valve and ME-21 brake stand After 1916: WABCO Schedule AMUE with UE-5 universal valve and ME-23 brake stand
- Coupling system: Before 1910: Van Dorn; After 1910: WABCO J
- Track gauge: 4 ft 8 1/2 in (1,435 mm)

The Composite was a New York City Subway car class built from 1903 to 1904 by the Jewett, St. Louis, Wason, and John Stephenson companies for the Interborough Rapid Transit Company and its successor, the New York City Board of Transportation.

The Composite derived its name from its build as a "protected wooden car". The car frame was made of steel, while the car body itself was made from wood encased in a layer of copper sheathing. The copper skin was intended to protect the car in the event of a fire in the subway. Therefore, the result was a body composed of several materials (as in a Composite material) and became known simply as a "Composite".

== Background ==
The first IRT subway in New York would prove to be the initial attempt at an underground heavy rail subway in America. For example, the underground portion of Boston's Green Line, which opened in 1897, had been light rail. Therefore, the IRT and its chief engineer George Gibbs felt compelled to develop a subway car that would be stronger and safer than any previously designed railway cars. This inevitably led them to the conclusion that it would be best to design an all-steel car to run in the new tunnels.

However, car manufacturers of the time were unwilling to undertake such an experimental proposition. Steel was deemed too heavy for any practical applications. The conventional wisdom of the day (since proven to be false) held that an all-steel car would vibrate itself to pieces, claiming wood was "necessary" for its damping effects on the car's vibration. It was also widely believed that a steel car would be very loud, and poorly insulated from temperature extremes such as heat and cold. With a large backlog of orders for wooden cars, manufacturers had no incentive to explore the new technology as there was still plenty of demand for wooden railcars. The IRT knew that the October 27, 1904 opening of the new subway route was fast approaching and that rolling stock had to be designed and built soon or the line would not be ready. With time running short to order rolling stock, a wood-based alternative had been proposed – a protected wooden car to be known as a Composite.

== Prototype construction ==
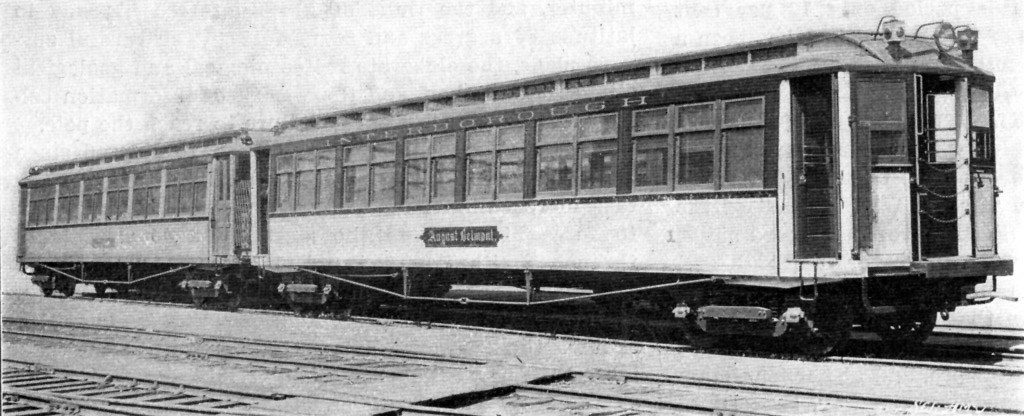
1902 Scientific American photograph of the IRT Composite Prototypes. August Belmont is in the foreground, while John B. McDonald is visible in the distance.

Engineering work began on the protected wooden cars, and two Composite prototypes were ordered from Wason in 1902. They were originally numbered 1 and 2, and named the August Belmont (after the president of the IRT) and the John B. McDonald (after the first subway's contractor), respectively. Each was designed to sample different features and amenities – the Belmont explored the possibility of offering a "first class" service (which never materialized), while the McDonald tested a layout intended to be more standard. After thorough evaluation of all features of both prototype cars, it was time to decide on a design for the Composites to be ordered for the subway. All engineering work on the cars was finally completed during 1902, and orders were placed with four manufacturers for 500 cars shortly thereafter.

The IRT was not finished visiting the all-steel car idea, however. In 1903, George Gibbs used his influence to contract with the Pennsylvania Railroad's shops in Altoona to build an all-steel prototype for the new subway. The all-steel prototype would serve as the inspiration for the Gibbs Hi-V cars, so named after George Gibbs, who had done so much to see to their creation. Along with similar all-steel equipment that arrived later, the Gibbs cars would eventually phase the Composites out of subway service. Meanwhile, as the effort to design a steel car continued in 1903, the IRT awaited the arrival of the Composites.

== Service history ==
=== Prototypes ===
The two Composite prototypes (cars 1 and 2 – the August Belmont and John B. McDonald) never saw passenger service in the tunnels of the IRT subway. They were renumbered 3340 and 3341 respectively, in 1903. August Belmont became an instruction car, while John B. McDonald was used to distribute payroll to employees until 1917. In 1917, one year after the production fleet of Composite cars had been converted for service on the elevated division, the prototype John B. McDonald was also converted and added to the elevated fleet where it ran alongside the rest of the Composite cars. Following retirement, both Composite prototypes were also scrapped.

=== Production cars ===
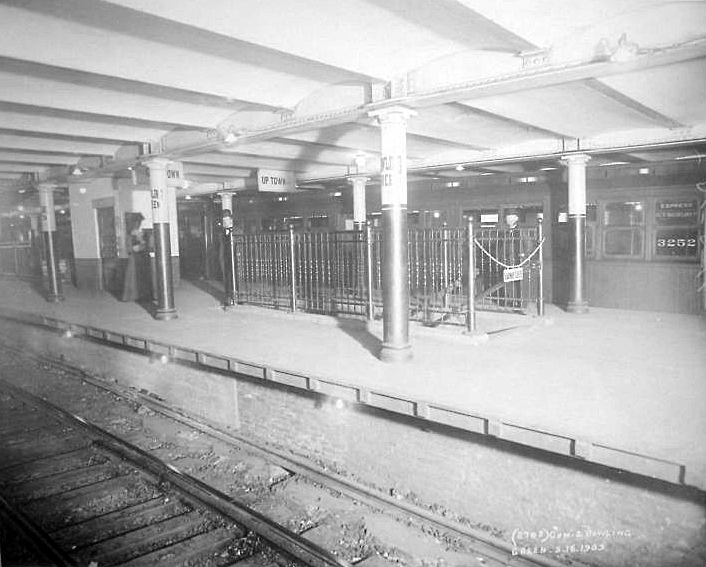
A view of Composite 3252 in service at Bowling Green in 1905

The mainline fleet of Composites began arriving in New York as early as 1903 and was tested on the IRT's elevated lines shortly thereafter as work continued on the IRT subway. They proved suitable for use. Along with the Gibbs Hi-Vs, the Composites were part of the original IRT fleet, which ran along New York City's first subway route (the IRT Manhattan Mainline) beginning October 27, 1904. The cars proved serviceable and continued onward in service from that point.

Not counting the two Composite prototypes, the IRT received 500 Composites: 340 motor cars and 160 trailers. Estimates by IRT engineers required a 3:1 ratio of motor cars to trailer cars. Therefore, when the 300 Gibbs Hi-V motors were added to these numbers, the new totals were 640 motor cars and 160 trailers. This was a surplus of motor cars. Shortly after delivery, therefore, the IRT began converting motor cars into trailers. As all Gibbs Hi-V cars were motors, the preference was to keep them that way while converting more Composite motors into trailers. By 1910, 208 of the 340 motorized Composite cars had been converted into trailers.

By 1909, it was determined that improvements needed to be made to the fleet. Since the design of the Composites was heavily influenced by both elevated equipment and railroad coaches of the time, the cars featured only two doors at the extreme ends of the subway car. It was determined that adding a center door for improved passenger flow would be a good idea. This required removing the transverse seats, which faced each other in the center of the car. After the modification, passenger seating would be in the longitudinal direction (along the sides of the car) only. This created more room for standees. This modification was completed on the cars by 1912.

Despite their copper sheathing, it was found that the subway cars were not that well "protected" from fire for service in the subway, as 23 Composites had been retired from service due to fire or minor accidents by 1916. They were outlawed from the subway by order of the Public Service Commission. In addition, since subsequent car orders for the IRT were all-steel, concerns had grown about the effects of running the wooden equipment alongside steel equipment, should a collision occur. Thankfully, one never did, save for a test done to see how the cars would fare. The Composite was badly crushed while the all-steel car suffered considerably less damage, proving the superior strength of the steel cars. As a result of these two fears – fire and collision – the 477 remaining Composites were transferred during 1916 to serve on the elevated division of the IRT. Doing so also meant modifying their weight accordingly so as to reduce the stress on the weaker elevated structures. On January 17, 1916, the first elevated trains of Composite cars were in service on the IRT Third Avenue and Second Avenue Lines, sharing tracks with the subway. Because of their added weight even with the lighter trucks, the Composites had to run without passengers in the anti-peak direction of their rush hour trips. The entire Composite car fleet had been transferred to the elevated lines in Manhattan by December 1916. The Composites remained on the elevated until their retirement in 1950.

Following their retirement, all of the Composite cars were scrapped by 1953.

== Description ==
=== Design ===
Because of the concerns over wooden construction, the Composites employed a number of vintage, turn-of-the-20th-century mechanisms to reduce the risk of fire. Most commonly, this involved the use of asbestos, electrobestos, or the asbestos-containing material transite. Since the adverse health effects of such were not yet fully known nor understood, asbestos was present in numerous locations throughout the car, most notably under the floors, and around any electrical wiring. All of the undercar electrical equipment was housed in steel boxes. Steel and wood were used to complement each other and give rigidity to the body by strengthening the frame. However, the side paneling of the car remained wood. But as an added fireproofing measure, the wood siding would be encased in a layer of copper sheathing that ran halfway up the side of the car.

Because of the Composites' copper sheathing, IRT crews and shop personnel coined the nickname for the cars: Copper Sides.

=== Interior ===
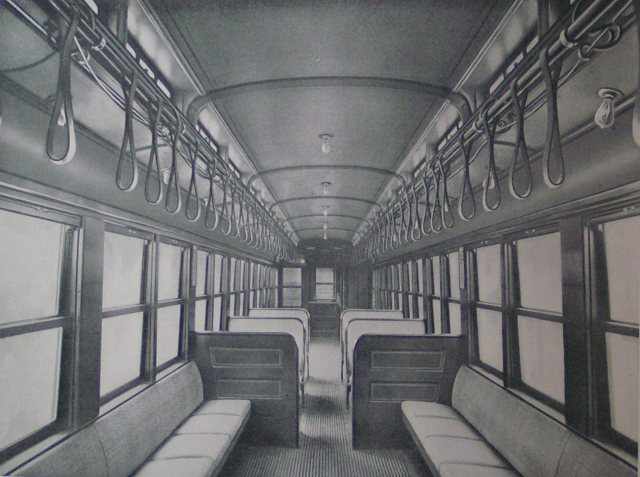
1904 rendering of the interior arrangement of an IRT Composite.

As originally delivered, the cars came only with two doors on each side of the car, located at the end vestibules. The original seating configuration was what was known as "Manhattan Style", a name given because the seating arrangement originated on the cars that ran on the Manhattan elevated lines during the 19th century. "Manhattan Style" seating featured eight transverse seats in the center of the car facing each other, and longitudinal benches down the sides of the remainder of the car. No seating was provided in end vestibules as they were primarily for entrance and exit, and to accommodate standees. Each end vestibule was accessible at all times except for the ones at the very front and very rear of a train, which were closed off by sliding vestibule doors to block entry. Because of this layout, crowd conditions were a true New York spectacle. IRT ridership and crowding conditions exceeded the expectations of the IRT's engineers. Exit was difficult, with riders needing to access the car's extremities for a pathway out of the car via the vestibule. Entering riders had to wait while exiting riders alighted from the train before they could begin a long boarding process. Consequently, the most prudent course of action was determined to be adding center doors to each Composite car. This modification took place from 1909 to 1912. Adding a center door to the car body, however, directly conflicted with the Manhattan style seating, so the center transverse seats had to be removed for these modifications. The car body had also not been designed with the strength necessary to support a center door, so when this modification was made, it was necessary to add fishbelly girders underneath the center doors to provide added strength for the car's frame.

The cars as delivered featured rattan seats and incandescent lighting, staples of most pre-WWII subway cars in New York City. All areas of the cars were lit, as bulbs were placed along the center roofline and down the sides of each car's interior. Additionally, pairs of bulbs on each end lit each end vestibule. As delivered, they did not come with fans, however, windows and clerestory vents along the upper roof could be opened for ventilation. All windows were drop sash type (rather than rising sash type) for improved safety and to reduce the amount of draught in moving cars. Floors were made of wood (maple), and grab holds were provided along the roof for standees. Originally, these grab holds were made of leather (as on elevated trains), and later replaced with the steel grab holds that were IRT standard for many years.

As originally delivered, the cars featured manual "Armstrong" doors, a reference to the "strong arm" that would be needed by trainmen to open them. Near each door, a large lever could be thrown by trainmen to open or close the doors. This meant that each train of Composites required a number of trainmen to operate doors at each station stop.

Route destinations and service patterns were indicated to riders by means of steel signs placed in holders along the side of the cars, near the doors. These signs could be physically removed and changed when a train was assigned to a different service pattern. Marker lights at the front and rear of each car also indicated the routes to crews en route, as well as astute riders who came to recognize their trains' marker light patterns over time.

Tunnel lighting was accomplished by means of kerosene lanterns hung on the front and rear of each train. Red was to be displayed in the rear of the train, and white was to be displayed at the front. At each terminal turnaround, lanterns would be changed to reflect the train's new direction of travel. Kerosene lamps were chosen because of their reliability. Even in the event of failure of subway third rail power, the kerosene lamps would remain lit.

=== Propulsion ===
All of the cars, as originally built, featured high voltage propulsion control equipment, which sent 600 volts through the motorman's control stand as well as through the train via the use of jumpers between cars. This had to be the case to make the electrical contacts to allow all of the motor cars of a train to draw power in a synchronized effort from the Third rail. However, this could be dangerous for motormen and shop personnel alike by creating an electrocution hazard. Even unpowered trailer cars had to carry the 600 volts through these jumpers because it was necessary to pass on the voltage to motor cars behind the trailer so as to synchronize them with the lead car. Motors, manufactured either by Westinghouse or General Electric, were 200 horsepower each. Each motor car was equipped with two motors.

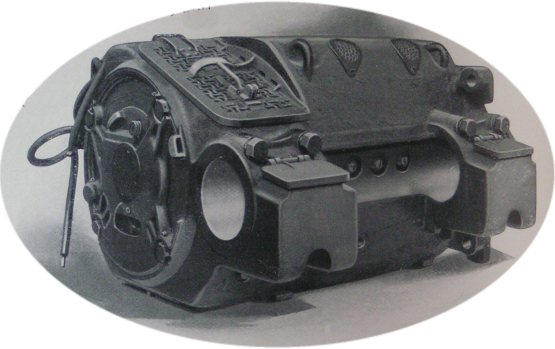
General Electric 69

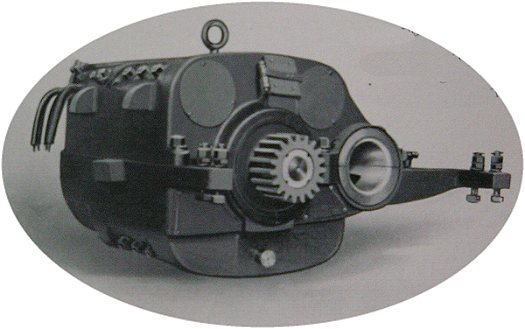
Westinghouse 86B

1904 Rendering of the types of 200hp motors used on Composites until 1916

Additionally, like all of the old high voltage equipment, the cars featured a ten-point brass controller with manual acceleration, which required motormen to notch up gradually as the train came up to speed. Should a motorman advance too quickly with the controller handle, however, a device would actually prevent the car's propulsion system from notching up at too rapid a rate. Mounted on the top of the controller handle was a button, which had to be depressed at all times acting as a deadman's switch, which would automatically apply the train's emergency brakes should the motorman let go. This was a safety feature designed to stop a train should a motorman become incapacitated. Variations of a deadman's switch, or deadman's device, have been used continuously since and are still used on all current New York City Subway rolling stock.

When it had been determined to transfer the Composites to the elevated division of the IRT in 1916, several changes were made to the equipment. As subway cars, the Composite motor cars were simply too heavy to run on elevated structures. Therefore, they were lightened. The trucks were replaced with the lighter elevated type, and smaller, less powerful motors (120 hp instead of 200 hp) were installed. As mentioned above, by 1916, 208 of the motorized Composites had already been converted into trailers. When the IRT looked at this and noted the reduction in power of motor cars associated with using the smaller motors, it decided to convert all Composite trailers to motors in 1916. While this modification added weight to the trailer cars, the load on each wheel was still within the acceptable range to run on elevated structures. Therefore, all Composites became motorized.

One other notable change occurred during the 1916 modifications. The high voltage propulsion control was replaced with a safer low voltage propulsion control, which utilized battery voltage (32 volts) to control the train's motors. This battery voltage was what would pass through the motorman's control stand and between cars. Tractive effort throughout the train was synchronized by the battery voltage in this way. Meanwhile, each car would respond individually to the battery voltage, by moving its own 600 volt contacts to direct power obtained locally by each car directly from the third rail toward the motors. Using 32 volts to control the propulsion in this way was a much safer proposition for trainmen and shop personnel than the 600 volts associated with the older high voltage setup.

=== Braking ===
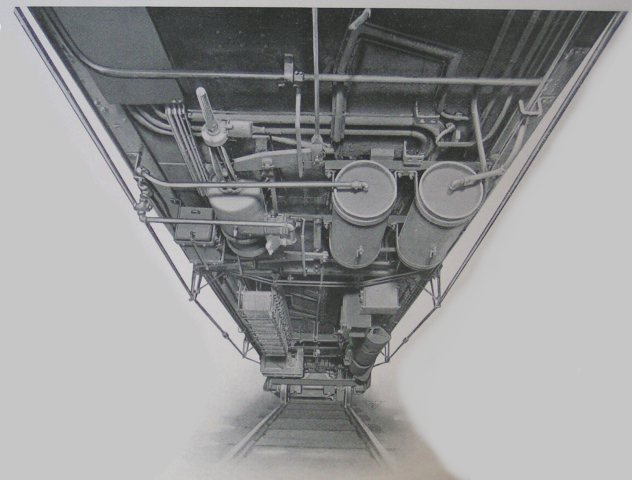
1904 rendering of the electric and pneumatic equipment underneath an IRT Composite.

The cars, as built, featured an old style of WABCO passenger braking equipment previously used on passenger railroads. The braking schedule was known as AM(P). Originally, it was known as AM, but the 'P' was added later to distinguish the setup from newer AM types like AML. Therefore, for the purposes of this notation, the P has been included in parentheses – as in Braking Schedule AM(P) – to acknowledge this change. On a train equipped with AM(P), there was no electric synchronization of braking throughout a train, so a braking effort took a few seconds to apply or release uniformly throughout a train as different cars reacted to the brake request (which was entirely pneumatic) at different times. Additionally, an operator could not partially reduce his braking effort so as to smooth out stops or correct if he had undershot the mark (a feature known as a graduated release of the brakes). The AM(P) setup required the train to fully release the brakes before they could be applied again. This made making precision stops in stations by motormen a real art, but a task that the majority of IRT motormen proved up to.

By 1910, an improved braking schedule had been introduced, known as AMRE. This setup and all others to come after, permitted graduated release of the brakes for finer control of brake applications. Additionally, AMRE allowed for the electric synchronization of braking throughout an entire train, causing all brakes on all cars of the train to apply uniformly and simultaneously. This created a smoother braking effort throughout the train. In order for the electric synchronization to work, it was necessary to insert an electric brake key to activate the feature. All of the older IRT cars, including the Composites, were refitted with the new AMRE system circa 1910.

When it had been decided to transfer the Composites to the elevated division of the IRT in 1916, the cars' braking was modernized further. In AMRE schedule braking, the electric brake must be activated at all times by the use of the electric brake key to synchronize the train's braking effort electrically. If it was not "cut in" or failed en route, the system could still be manipulated to apply the brakes pneumatically. This would still allow the train to stop, but deceleration would take longer such as on the older AM(P) schedule braking. However, in AMRE, the notches in the brake stand to cause this pneumatic application are completely separate from the notches to cause an electric application. Therefore, if a motorman with a defective or inactive electric AMRE brake were to electrically apply the brakes, nothing would happen. Valuable seconds would be lost while he realized his electric brake was inactive before he could move to the pneumatic apply notch to begin slowing his train down (which would still take longer than usual without electric synchronization of the brakes). In a serious scenario, this could cause him to overshoot a station or an important stopping point, or overspeed. In a new braking schedule known as AMUE, however, the electric and pneumatic notches are joined on the motorman's brake stand. Therefore, even if the electric brake is defective or inactive, his moving the brake handle to the apply position would still begin setting up a pneumatic application of the brakes, creating a much quicker response to the condition than possible under any other previous system. As part of the modifications for elevated service, the Composites were equipped with AMUE schedule braking from 1916 until their retirement.
