= R62A (New York City Subway car) =

Class of New York City Subway car

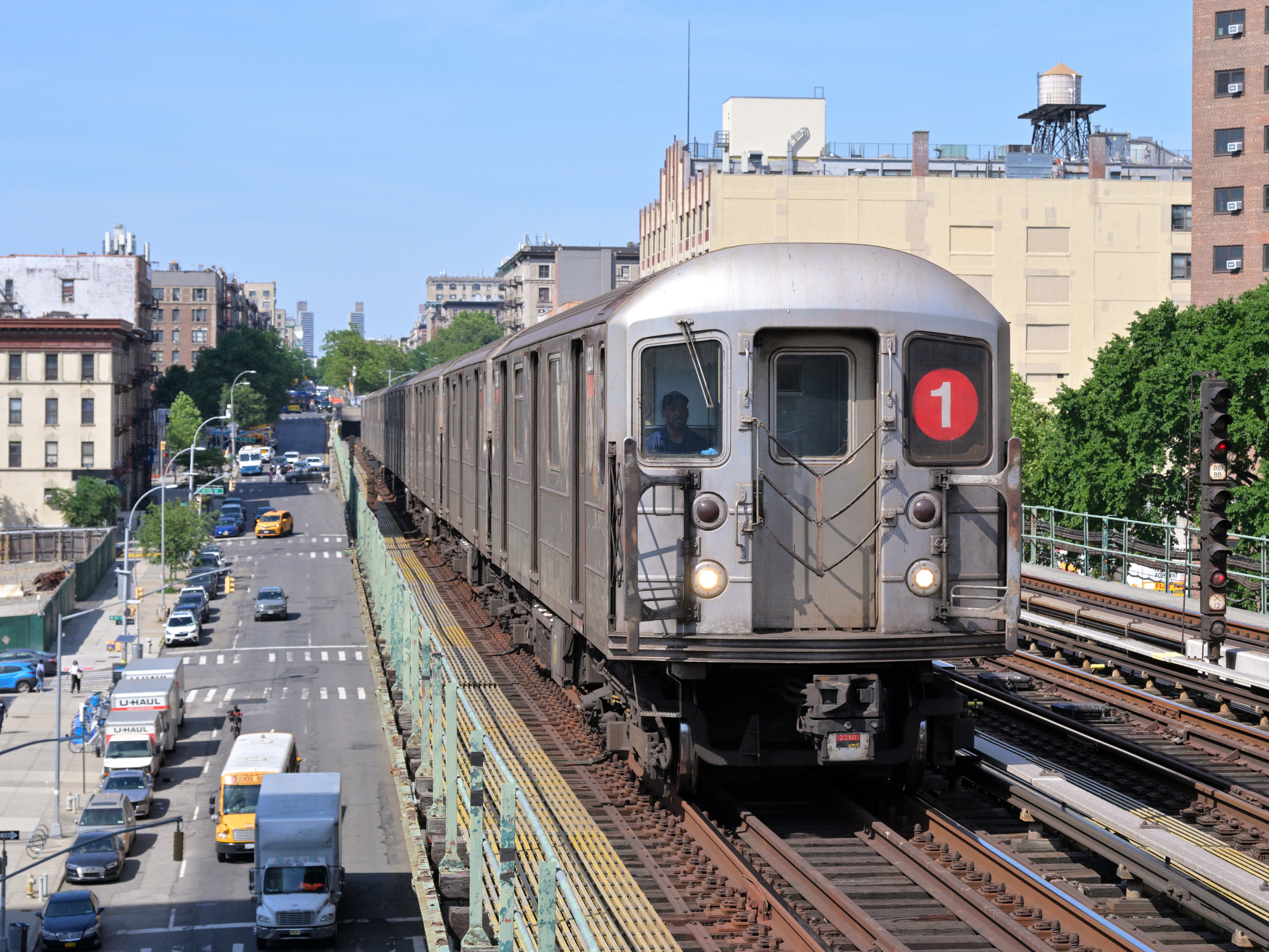
- An R62A train on the 1 approaching 125th St

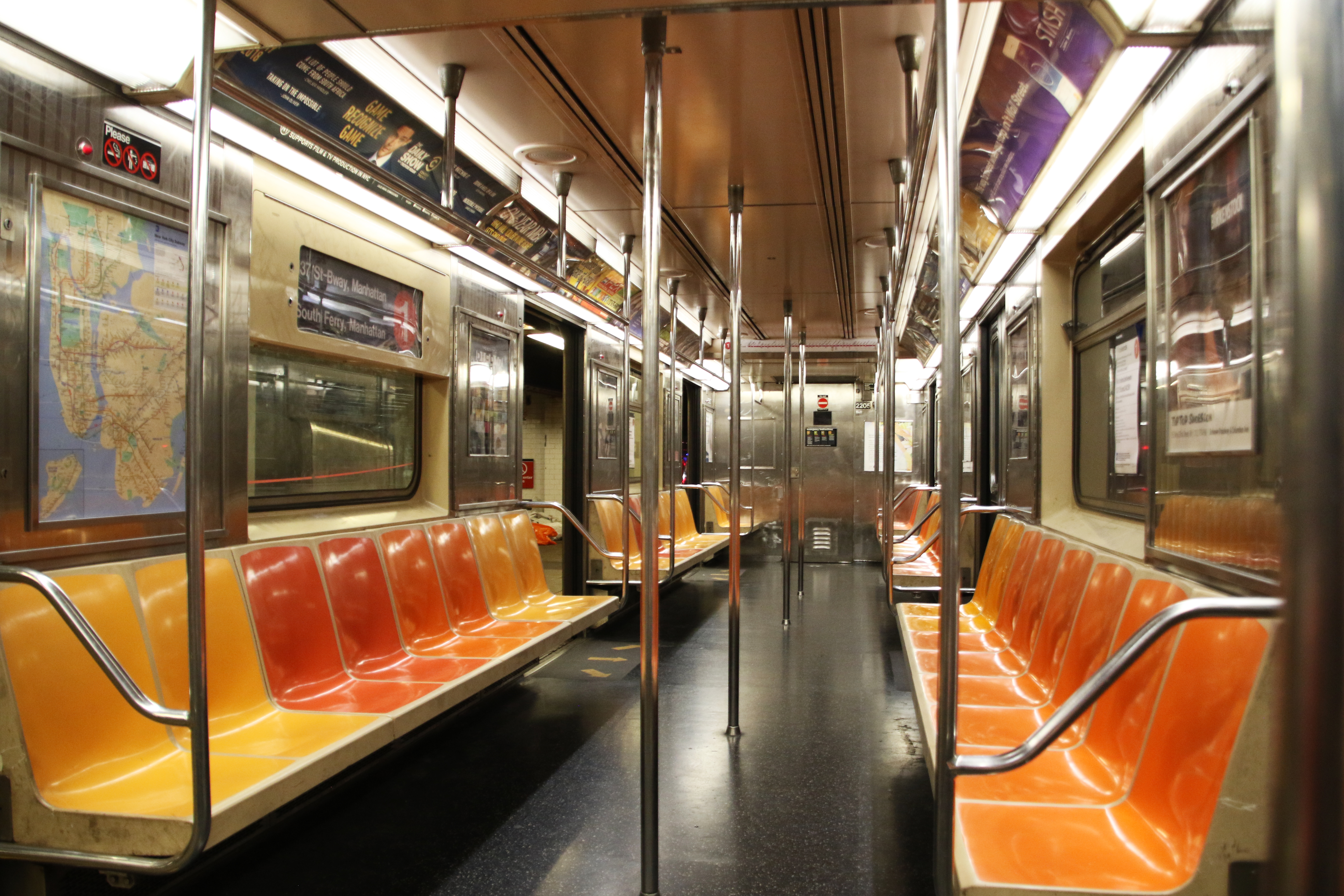
- Interior of an R62A car
- Stock type: Subway electric multiple unit
- In service: May 29, 1985 – present (41 years)
- Manufacturer: Bombardier Transportation
- Built at: La Pocatière, Quebec; Auburn, New York; Barre, Vermont (final assembly)
- Family name: SMEE
- Replaced: All R17s, R21s, and R22s
- Constructed: 1984–1987
- Entered service: May 29, 1985
- Refurbished: 1996–1999 (modified from single cars to 5-car sets; cars 1651–1900 & 2156–2475 only); 2017–2020 (42nd Street shuttle cars)
- Number built: 825
- Number in service: 823
- Number scrapped: 1
- Successor: R262
- Formation: 5-car sets (1651–1900, 1961–2475); Single units (select cars from 1906–1960); 6-car sets (other select cars from 1901–1960)
- Fleet numbers: 1651–2475
- Capacity: 42 (A car, full-width cab at one end, half width cab at other end); 44 (B car, half-width cabs at both ends)
- Operator: New York City Subway
- Depots: 240th Street Yard (360 cars); Livonia Yard (24 cars); Westchester Yard (430 cars)
- Services assigned: (Updated June 30, 2024)

Specifications
- Car body construction: Stainless steel with fiberglass end bonnets
- Train length: 6-car train: 306.24 feet (93.34 m); 10-car train: 510.4 feet (155.6 m)
- Car length: 51.04 feet (15.56 m)
- Width: 8.60 feet (2,621 mm)
- Height: 11.89 feet (3,624 mm)
- Platform height: 3.65 ft (1.11 m)
- Doors: 6 sets of 50 inch wide side doors per car
- Maximum speed: 55 mph (89 km/h)
- Weight: 75,550 lb (34,270 kg)
- Traction system: Adtranz E-Cam propulsion with 4 Westinghouse 1447J motors per car
- Power output: 115 hp (85.8 kW) per axle
- Acceleration: 2.5 mph/s (4.0 km/(h⋅s))
- Deceleration: 3.0 mph/s (4.8 km/(h⋅s)) (Full Service); 3.2 mph/s (5.1 km/(h⋅s)) (Emergency)
- Auxiliaries: SAFT NIFE PR80F Battery; SAFT SMT8 Battery
- Electric systems: Third rail, 625 V DC
- Current collection: Contact shoe
- Braking systems: NYAB GSX23 Newtran “COBRA SMEE” Braking System; NYAB Tread Brake Unit
- Safety systems: Dead man's switch, tripcock, emergency brakes
- Coupling system: Westinghouse H2C
- Headlight type: Halogen light bulb
- Track gauge: 4 ft 8 1/2 in (1,435 mm) standard gauge

The R62A is a New York City Subway car model built between 1984 and 1987 by Bombardier Transportation for the A Division. The cars were built in La Pocatière, Quebec, with final assembly done in Auburn, New York and Barre, Vermont, under a license from Kawasaki Heavy Industries, manufacturer of the previous R62 order. A total of 825 cars were built, arranged as sets of three, four, or five cars per set. The cars replaced the remaining R17s, R21s, and R22s, which were all retired by early 1988.

The R62As were a follow-up order to the R62 order from 1981, and the second order of stainless steel cars for the "A" Division. The contract had been given to Bombardier due to Kawasaki's refusal to build the additional cars under a separate order. The first R62As entered service on May 29, 1985, and all were delivered by 1988. The R62As are scheduled to remain in service until at least the mid 2030s, when they will be replaced with the R262s.

== Description ==
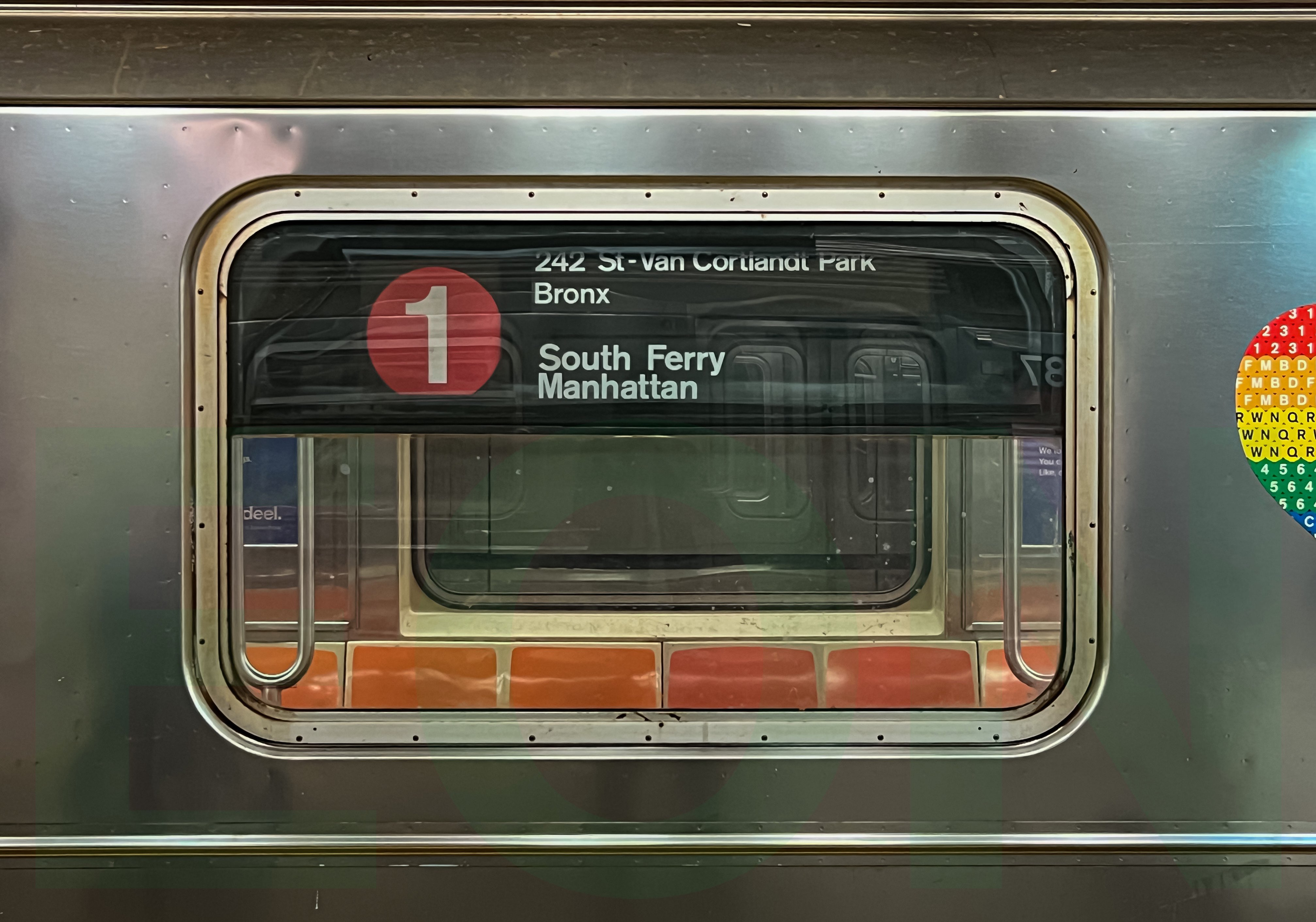
Exterior side destination and route rollsigns of an R62A

The R62As are numbered 1651–2475. Like the R62 order from Kawasaki Heavy Industries, the R62A was made of stainless steel and had air conditioning. A graffiti-resistant glaze was applied to all of the cars because of the extensive graffiti tagging of nearly all of the subway cars in the system since 1969. They continued a controversial interior design by employing bucket seating, which was very narrow, with each seat being about 17 inches (430 mm) wide. This reduced the number of seats per car when compared to standard bench seating, but allowed for higher standing capacity.

The cars were originally single cars with functioning half-width cabs at both ends, but were eventually linked into sets with full-width cabs at each end. All cars running on the 1 (based at 240th Street Yard in the Bronx) and almost all cars on the 6 (based at the Westchester Yard in the Bronx) are linked as five-car sets, while all cars running on the 42nd Street Shuttle (based at Livonia Yard in Brooklyn) are linked as six-car sets. All cars still have their intermediate half-width cabs in the remaining cab positions.

Many cars used on the 6 route feature LED lights on the sides of the cars around the rollsign where the service logo is indicated to help riders distinguish between an express train (red diamond) and a local train (green circle). These indicators were first introduced on the 7 when passengers claimed they could not clearly hear the announcements regarding whether the 7 was express or local, even though the "7 Express" sign was used on the front and sides prior to its implementation in 2008. Cars 1736–1740 and 2151 were used as test cars as early as April 12, 2007, and had red LED lettering displaying "LCL" and "EXP" on the front and the side; similar labeling was last seen on the Redbird fleet. When the R188s displaced the R62As from the 7 during the 2010s, the LED lights remained in use since both the 6 and the 7 local services have express variants that run in the peak direction during rush hours.

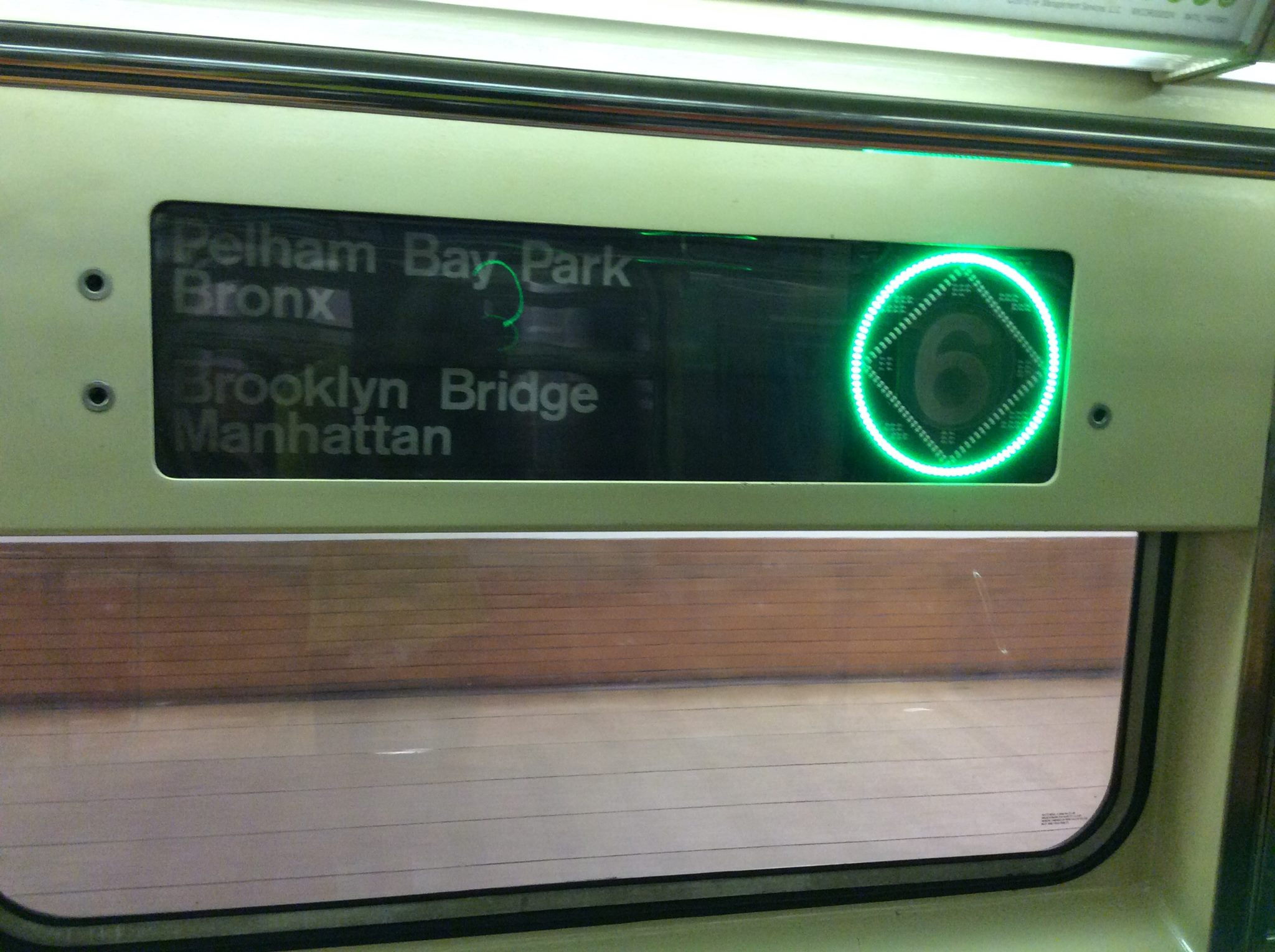
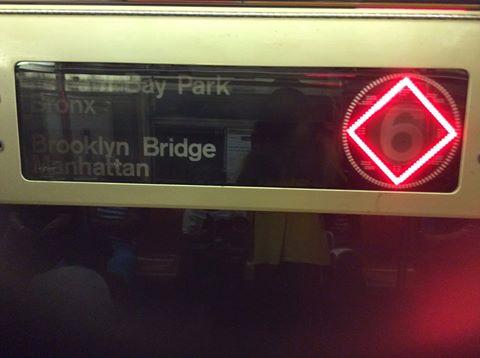
R62A LED destination sign set to a green circle (left, for local trains) and a red diamond (right, for express trains)

== History ==
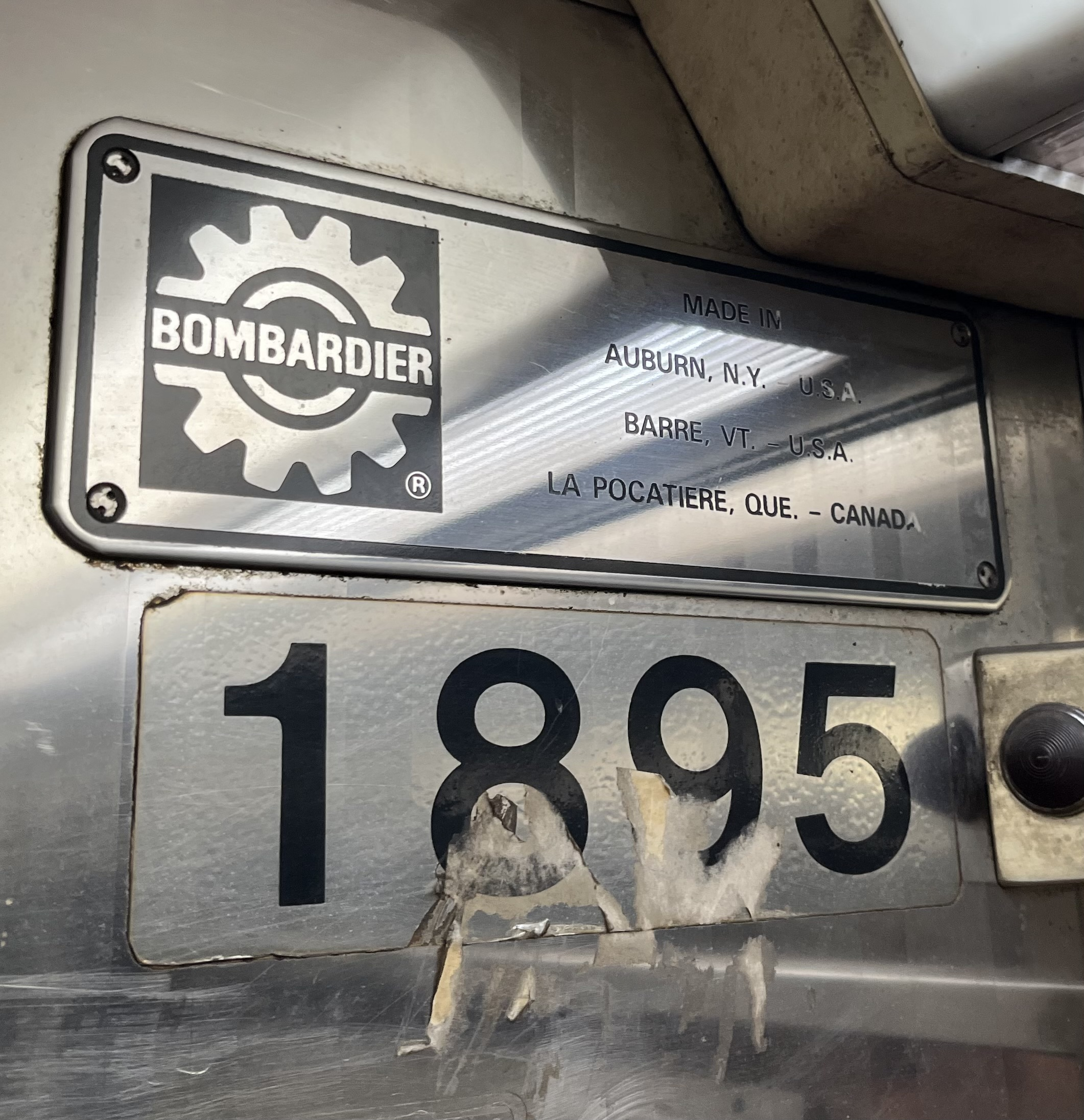
Builders plate of the R62A cars

Following the successful delivery of the 325-car R62 order, the New York City Transit Authority (NYCTA) put out a bid for an additional 825 cars. Kawasaki did not want to build the additional cars under a separate contract, so the R62A contract was awarded to Bombardier Transportation of Quebec, who won the bid over Budd Company of Pennsylvania. While Bombardier offered a higher price per car than Budd had, the NYCTA awarded the contract to Bombardier because the Canadian government offered a more favorable financing plan for the cars. In addition, Budd proposed using unapproved and untested motors, as well as similarly untested technology that frequently broke down on the R44 and R46 fleets.

The 825 cars were built between 1984 and 1987 and entered service between 1985 and 1988, though in August 1985, several cars were frequently taken out of service due to coupler and electrical problems, which almost forced the cancellation of the entire order itself. The first ten R62As, numbered 1651–1660, had their body shells built by Kawasaki Heavy Industries in Japan and were shipped to Bombardier for their use as samples during their production. They were placed in service on the 1 train on May 29, 1985, after arrangements were made to expand the Car Appearance Program to the route (following a successful implementation of the same on the 4 train with the R62s).

=== Post-delivery ===
Car 1687 was badly damaged at the Bombardier plant in the summer of June 3, 1985, prior to its delivery. However, it was repaired at the end of the order and entered service on December 1, 1987, on the 6 train.

On November 24, 1996, a ten-car train of R62As on the 6 train derailed south of Hunts Point Avenue. Cars 1716 and 1909 were significantly damaged. Car 1716 was rebuilt and returned to service, but 1909 was retired due to mid-body and frame damage and scrapped in 2001.

Starting in November 2017, as part of an action plan to fix the subway's state of emergency, several cars assigned to the 42nd Street Shuttle had most of their seats removed in order to increase capacity on that service. The other cars assigned to the shuttle also had most of their seats removed as all cars running on said line were linked into six-car sets.

On January 4, 2024, two 1 trains made up of R62A cars partially derailed and collided just north of the 96th Street station. One train was in service, while the other was out of service being moved. 24 minor injuries were reported. Car 2176 and various cars in consist 2411–2415 suffered severe damage on the front as a result. Cars 2177–2180 were ultimately linked with car 1934 and returned to service in March 2024. Cars 2411–2415 were repaired separately and returned to service as well. Car 2176 was retired and is currently being cannibalized for its spare usable parts to keep the rest of the R62A cars running.

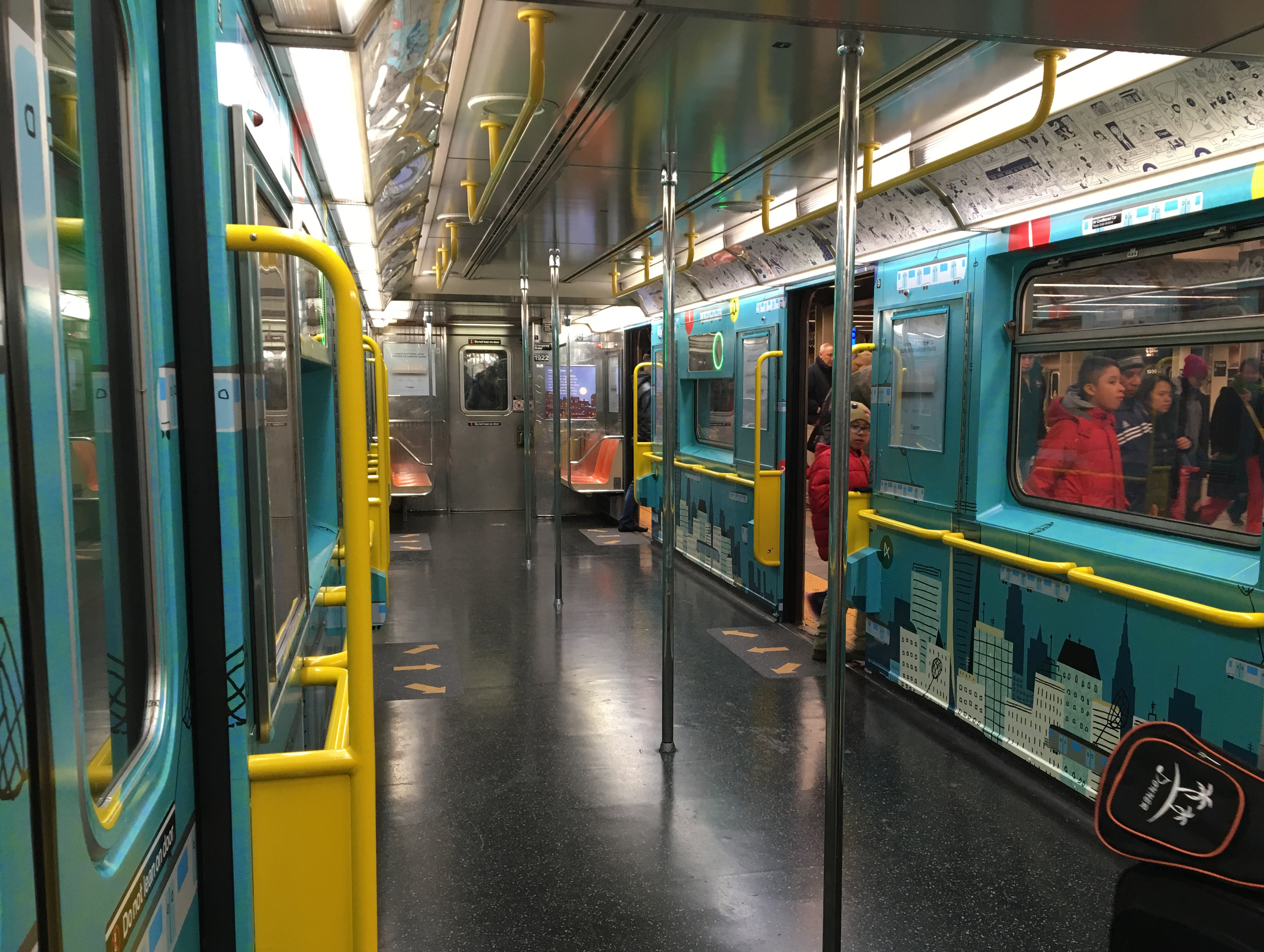
Interior of a refurbished R62A car on the 42nd Street Shuttle, with most seats removed to increase capacity

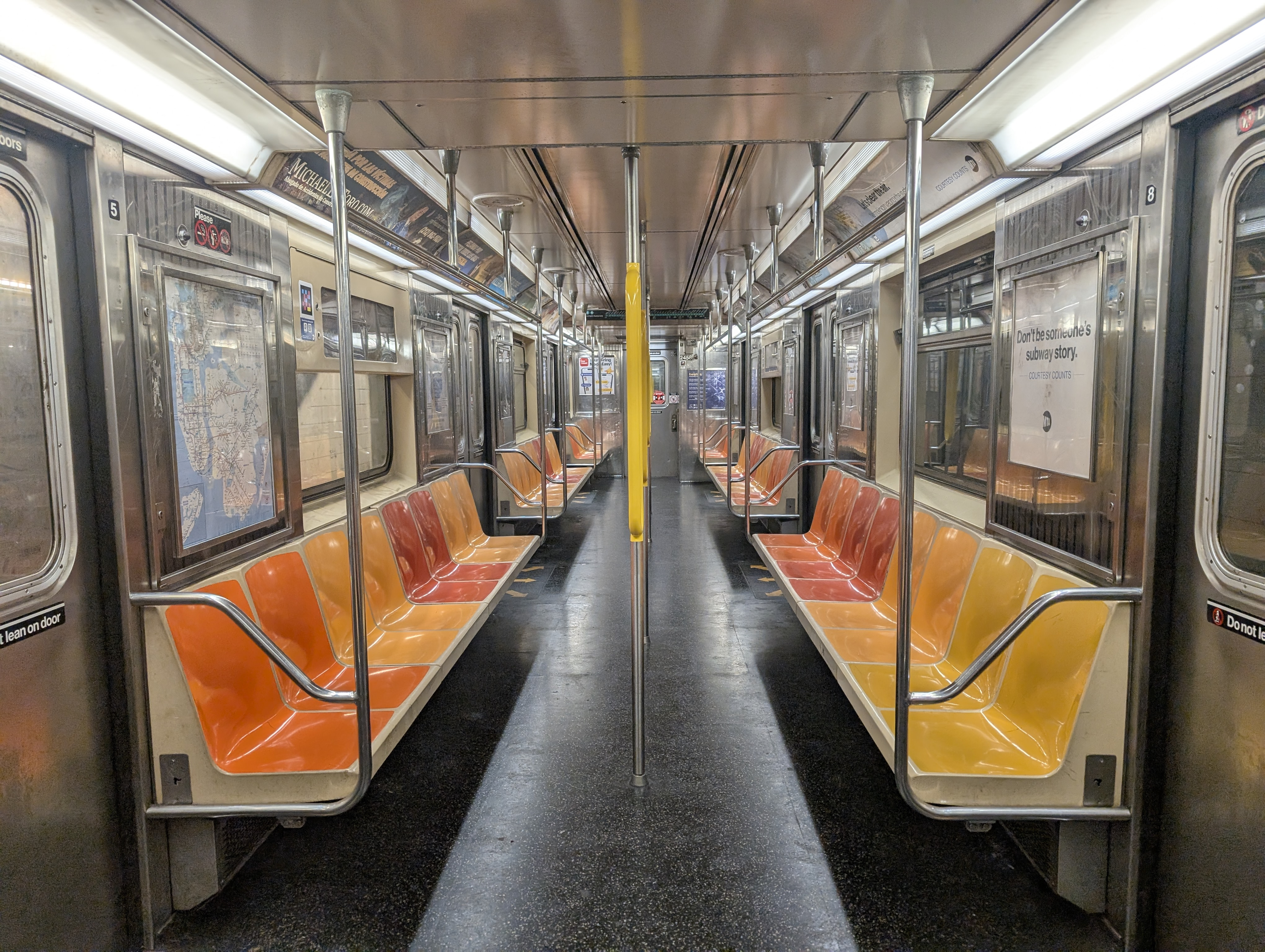
Interior of a refurbished R62A car on the 6 train

=== Replacement ===
The replacement of the cars is expected to start in the early-mid 2030s at earliest. The MTA has been maintaining the R62As through the SMS program, which consists of repainting bulkheads, rebuilding trucks, changing out floors, repainting damaged seats, and other minor interior work on a set schedule in order to extend useful service life. In 2010, the MTA proposed mid-life technological upgrades for the R62As, including LED destination signs and automated announcements.

In January 2019, the MTA announced that it would be replacing the R62/A fleets with the R262s, a new fleet that would be ordered as part of a future capital program. In early 2026, the MTA announced it would be placing the order of 1,140 new R262 train cars to replace the current R62 and R62A fleet.

== In popular culture ==
The main subway cars of Grand Theft Auto III are based on the R62As.

A set of R62As is featured at Grand Central–42nd Street station, on the 4 train for the movie Madagascar.

A group of R62As is featured at 14th Street–Union Square station, on the 4 train, for the movie Subway Stories.

An R62A is featured in Inside Llewyn Davis. However, the train is historically inaccurate, as the film is set in the early 1960s, decades before the R62As were constructed.
