= R22 (New York City Subway car) =

Retired class of New York City Subway car

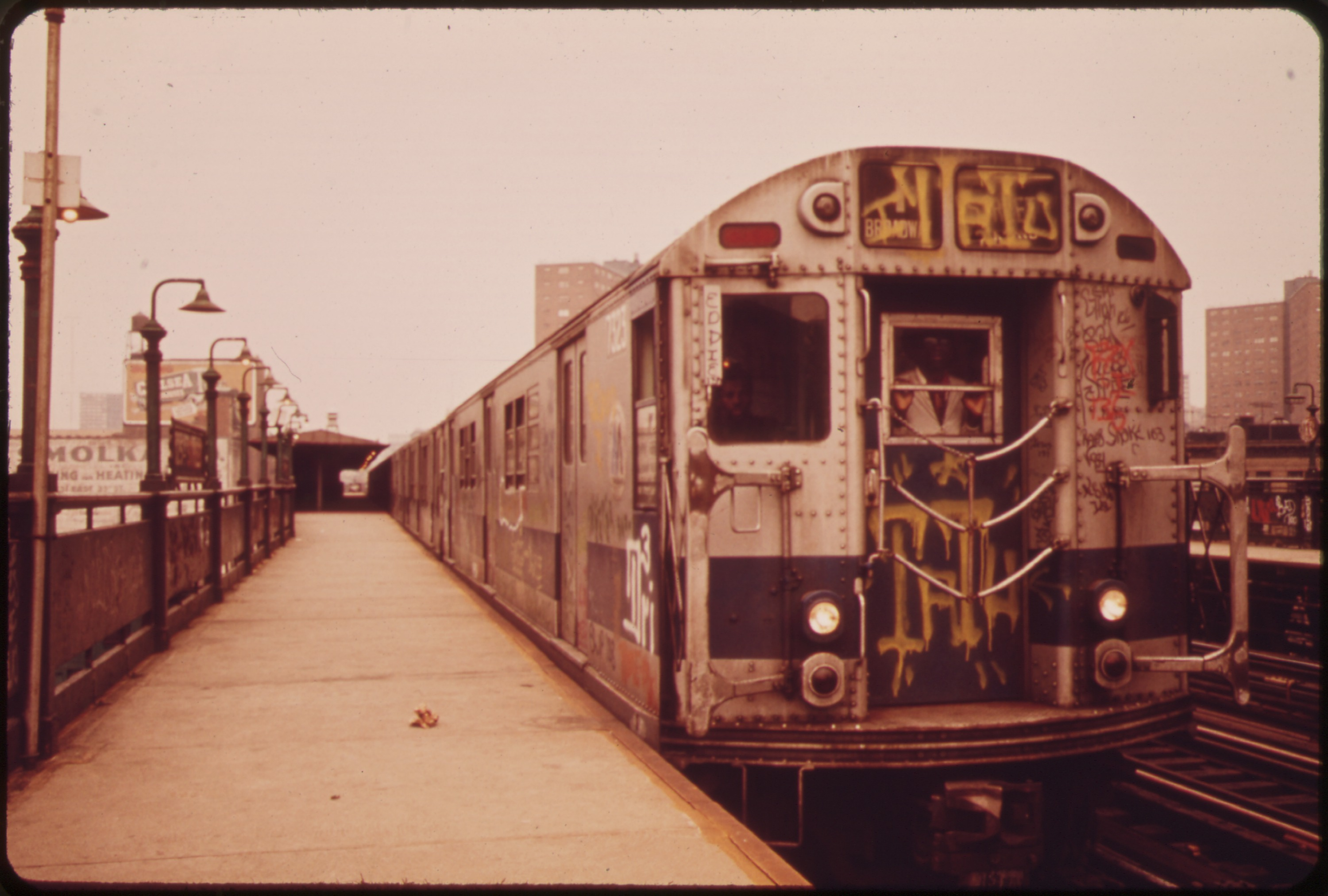
- A graffiti-covered R22 train on the 1 at 125th Street
- In service: April 13, 1957 – December 30, 1987 (30 years)
- Manufacturer: St. Louis Car Company
- Built at: St. Louis, Missouri
- Replaced: All Gibbs Hi-Vs; All Deck Roof Hi-Vs; All Hedley Hi-Vs
- Constructed: 1957–1958
- Entered service: April 13, 1957
- Scrapped: 1987
- Number built: 450
- Number in service: (10 in work service)
- Number preserved: 2
- Number scrapped: 438; 437 scrapped 1 in storage
- Successor: R62A
- Formation: Single unit cars
- Fleet numbers: 7300–7524 (Westinghouse); 7525–7749 (General Electric)
- Capacity: 44 (seated)
- Operator: New York City Transit Authority

Specifications
- Car body construction: LAHT Carbon steel
- Car length: 51 ft 0.5 in (15.56 m)
- Width: 8 ft 9 in (2,667 mm)
- Height: 11 ft 10 in (3,607 mm)
- Doors: 6 sets of 50 inch wide side doors per car
- Maximum speed: 55 mph (89 km/h)
- Weight: General Electric cars: 77,607 lb (35,202 kg); Westinghouse cars: 78,604 lb (35,654 kg)
- Traction system: Westinghouse 1447C or General Electric 1240A4
- Power output: 100 hp (75 kW) per traction motor
- Electric systems: 600 V DC third rail
- Current collection: Top running Contact shoe
- Braking system: WABCO ME42A
- Safety systems: Tripcock; ATO (1962–64, six-car test train)
- Track gauge: 4 ft 8 1/2 in (1,435 mm) standard gauge

The R22 was a New York City Subway car built by the St. Louis Car Company from 1957 to 1958. The cars were a "follow-up" or supplemental stock for the A Division's R21s and closely resemble them. A total of 450 cars were built, arranged as single units. Two versions were manufactured: Westinghouse (WH)-powered cars and General Electric (GE)-powered cars.

The first R22s entered service on April 13, 1957. Several cars in the fleet were retrofitted as part of an automated-signaling test on the 42nd Street Shuttle in 1962 and were destroyed in a 1964 fire. The R22s were replaced by the R62As in the 1980s, and the final train of R22s ran on December 30, 1987. Several R22 cars were preserved, though the majority were scrapped.

== Description ==
The R22s were numbered 7300–7749. They were the last single cars built prior to the R33S cars built in 1963.

The fleet had two-paned storm door windows that could be opened by dropping down the upper window, though cars 7515–7524 had single drop sash windows instead. Those cars also had Plextone-painted interiors and pink-molded fiberglass seats. In addition, the R22s were the first cars to have sealed beam headlights.

There were two versions of the R22: Westinghouse Electric-powered cars (7300–7524) and General Electric-powered cars (7525–7749).

== History ==
The R22s first entered service on April 13, 1957, starting to replace most of the IRT "high voltage" type cars. The R22s ran in service for most of their service lives on the IRT Broadway–Seventh Avenue Line painted in green livery.

Cars 7513, 7509, 7516, 7654, 7675, and 7686 were used as an automatic test train, which ran in revenue service on the 42nd Street Shuttle starting in January 1962. The experiment ended on April 21, 1964, when a fire partially destroyed the Grand Central shuttle platform as well as car 7740. Cars 7509, 7513, and 7516 were not in use at the time; thus, they were not damaged in the fire, but the cars never returned to revenue service. In 1973, car 7509 was converted to the 64-foot (19.51 m) test car XC375, which operated on various IRT lines until April 1982, and scrapped on July 12, 1996.

=== Retirement ===
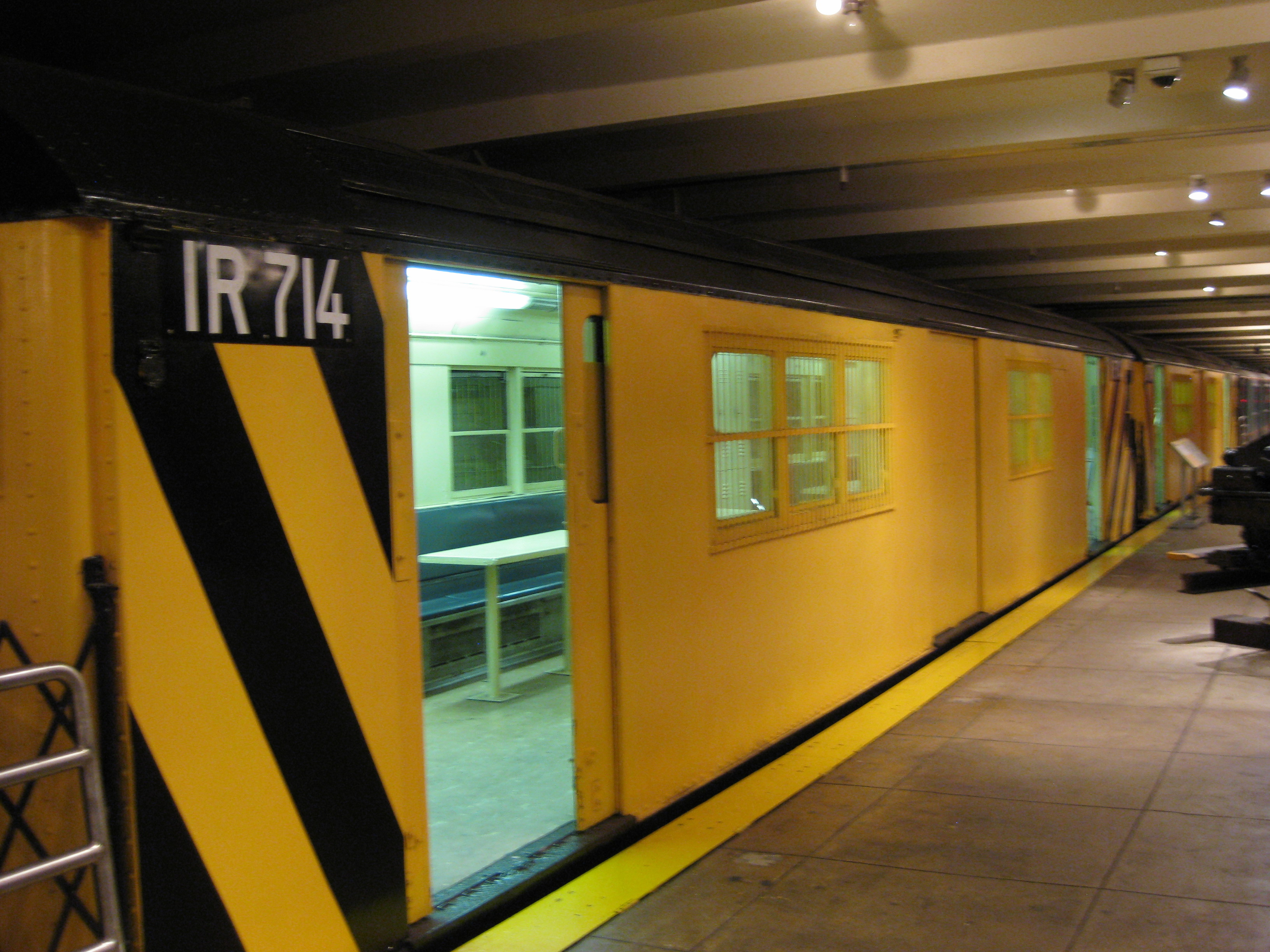
R22 car 1R714 on display at the New York Transit Museum

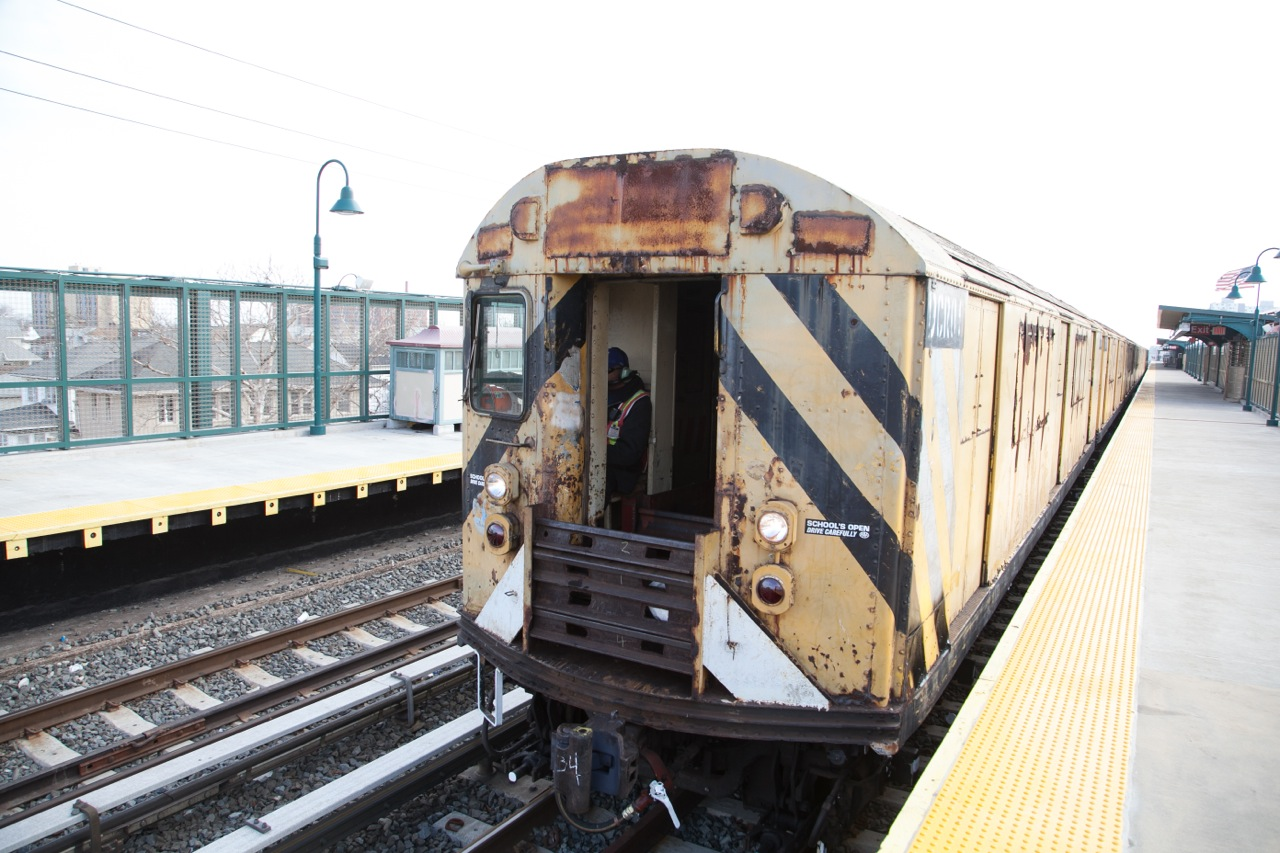
R22 Car DCR08 (formerly 7691) at Beach 67th Street

The incoming R62A fleet began replacing the R22s in the 1980s. The R22 fleet subsequently retired on December 30, 1987 on the 5 line along with the R21s.

The majority of the fleet was scrapped, but some R22s have been set aside for preservation over the years, including:

- 7371 – converted to a work car and used until 2004. The car was temporarily displayed at the New York Transit Museum and was used on a fan trip in May 2005 before being donated to the Seashore Trolley Museum in Kennebunkport, Maine. It is fully operational, though modified with trolley poles, and makes occasional runs around the museum, often coupled to R33S car 9327. The car lost its original number plates and now bears number plates from other retired R22 subway cars (7370, 7373, 7435, and 7460).
- 7422 – converted to R95 revenue collection car 1R714. The car was retired in 2006 and is now preserved by the New York Transit Museum.

A handful of R22 cars are currently in work service:

- 7346, 7376, 7413, 7432, 7571, and 7629 were converted to R71 hose reach cars and overhauled under the R159 program.
- 7397, 7441, 7608, and 7633 were converted to R71 de-icer cars and overhauled under the R159 program.

7486 (renumbered G7486) is currently at the 207th Street Yard. The car was stripped and was to be reefed, but is now awaiting scrapping.

19 R22s, including 7422, were converted to R95 revenue collection cars, but were retired in 2006 after tokens were discontinued. Car 1R714 (formerly 7422) was preserved, while the rest were reefed.

16 R22s were converted to R71 rider cars after retirement, but were replaced with R161s (R33s converted into rider cars) in the mid-2000s and eventually reefed.

Cars 7303, 7340, 7446, 7505, 7657, 7659, and 7691 were converted to R123 continuous welded rail holder cars and overhauled under the R128 program, but were replaced with R157 flat cars in the 2010s and eventually scrapped.

== In popular culture ==
A train of R22s was featured in The Taking of Pelham One Two Three, a 1974 film about the hijacking of a downtown 6 train. At least two different R22 cars portrayed Pelham 1-2-3. As it enters 28th Street station, the head car is labeled 7339. However, in an early scene at Grand Central, 7339 is seen on the express track across the platform. Later, after being cut from the rest of the train, the head car is labeled 7434.
