= Deck Roof Hi-V (New York City Subway car) =

Retired class of New York City Subway car

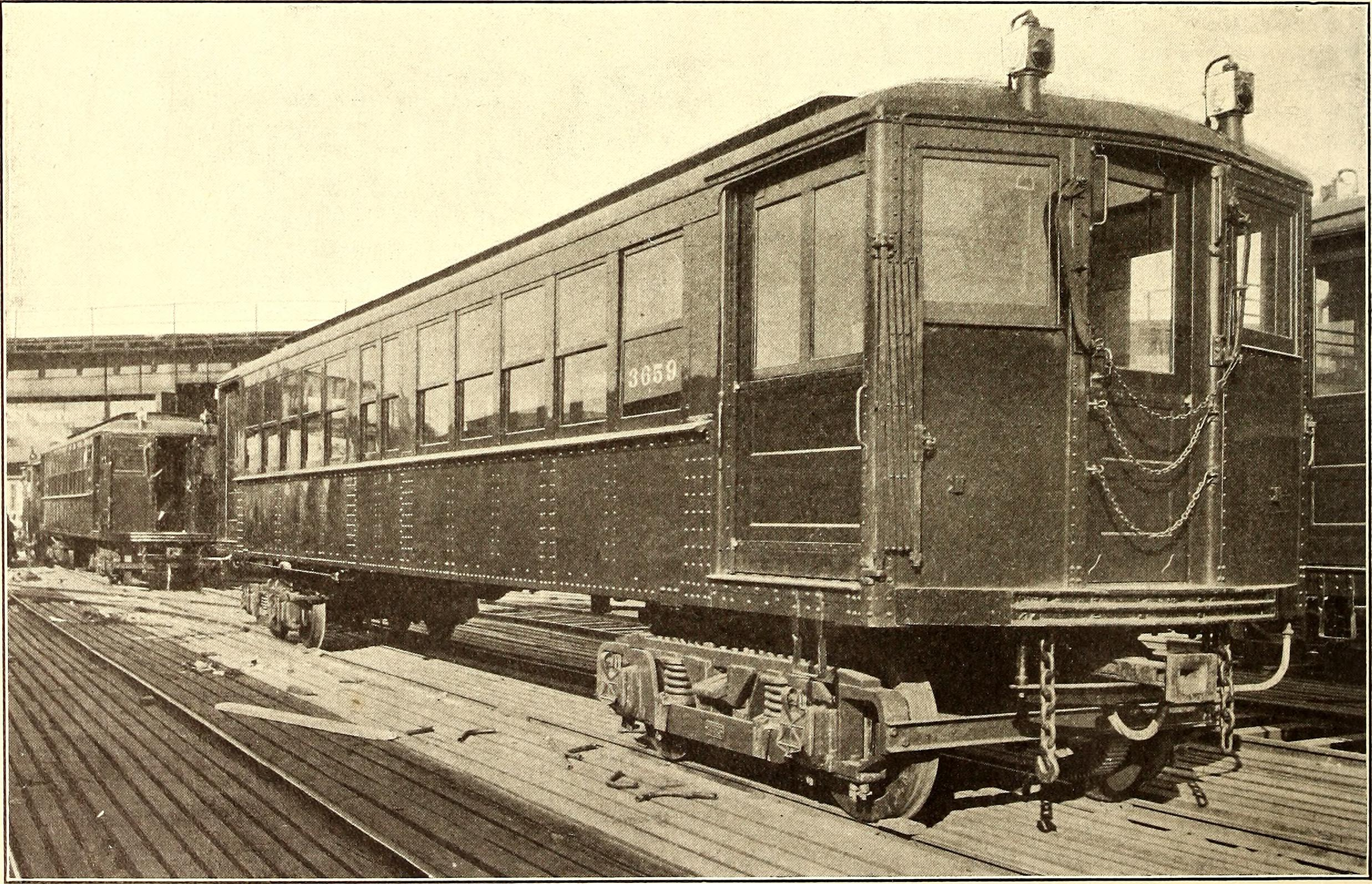
- A Deck Roof Hi-V car as it appeared in 1908.
- In service: 1907–1958
- Manufacturer: American Car and Foundry
- Constructed: 1907–1908
- Number built: 50
- Number preserved: 1
- Number scrapped: 49
- Successor: R17; R21; R22
- Formation: Singles
- Fleet numbers: 3650–3699
- Operators: Interborough Rapid Transit Company; NYC Board of Transportation; New York City Transit Authority

Specifications
- Car body construction: Riveted Steel
- Car length: 51 ft 1.5 in (15.58 m)
- Width: 8 ft 10 in (2,692 mm)
- Height: 12 ft 0 in (3,658 mm)
- Doors: Up until the early 1910s: 4 After the 1910s: 6
- Maximum speed: 55 mph (89 km/h)
- Weight: Motor car: ~83,780 lb (38,002 kg)
- Traction system: Motor car: GE212 2 motors per car.
- Power output: 200 hp (149 kW) per traction motor
- Electric systems: 600 V DC third rail
- Current collection: Contact shoe
- Braking systems: Before 1910: WABCO Schedule AM(P) with 'P' type triple valve and M-2 brake stand After 1910: WABCO Schedule AMRE with 'R' type triple valve and ME-21 brake stand
- Track gauge: 4 ft 8 1/2 in (1,435 mm)

The Deck Roof Hi-V was a New York City Subway car class built from 1907 to 1908 by the American Car and Foundry for the IRT and its successors, the New York City Board of Transportation and the New York City Transit Authority.

== Description ==
A total of 50 Deck Roofs were built, numbered 3650–3699. These cars were in service from 1907 to 1958. These cars were nicknamed the Battleships because of their paint scheme where the siding was painted Battleship Grey.

When these cars were delivered, they had two doors on each side until the early 1910s, when they received another door in the middle on each side. The facing cross seats in the center, typical of el cars, were removed to accommodate the added center doors.

At the same time, as with the Gibbs cars, these Deck Roof cars were retrofitted with the more advanced type couplers and AMRE triple valve braking system introduced in the later Hedley High-V motors.

As with the Gibbs cars, many of these Deck Roof cars received motors originally in the Composites which were converted to trailers, but a small number received brand new motors, to speed these cars into service faster. Just like the Gibbs cars, the Deck Roofs sent 600 volts into the controller, which was hazardous. Otherwise, these cars proved to be reliable throughout their career.

In 1923 and 1936, the High-V fleet was being converted to multiple-unit door control, with the exception of all 50 of the Deck Roofs and some Gibbs and Hedley cars. The Deck Roofs were often placed at either end of the train so that ten car trains of High-Vs could run.

== History ==
The Deck Roof cars served mostly in Broadway services, both Express and Local, throughout their lives. A number of trains served both rush hour Lexington Ave. Express services: Jerome Ave. and White Plains Rd., during the period that the regular Steinways were being used in Broadway Express service for a brief period from 1950 to 1952. These were returned to Broadway in 1952 as part of an equipment swap to save on crews.

The first 4 of these cars were held aside for the Bowling Green–South Ferry Shuttle and had the center door cutout feature, indicated by the white line outside under the number.

Until the late 1950s and early 1960s, the IRT platforms could not handle a full ten car train. Thus, the manual door controls of the Deck Roof were reliable, as the side vestibule doors at either end of the train can be opened manually even if the entire car isn't on the platform. However, two conductors were required for the operation of trains with manual door-controlled cars. Unlike the BMT and IND Divisions, full length trains of all older types of IRT cars always used two conductors.

=== Retirement ===
When all the platforms on the IRT were eventually lengthened to support ten car trains, the High-Vs were being phased out by the then new R17, R21, and R22 subway cars. The last of the High-Vs was retired in 1958.

Car 3662 is preserved by the Shore Line Trolley Museum, modified with trolley poles. It was previously operational, but a flood at the museum site damaged the car's electrical underfloor components. It is currently out of service awaiting restoration.
