= New York City Subway rolling stock =

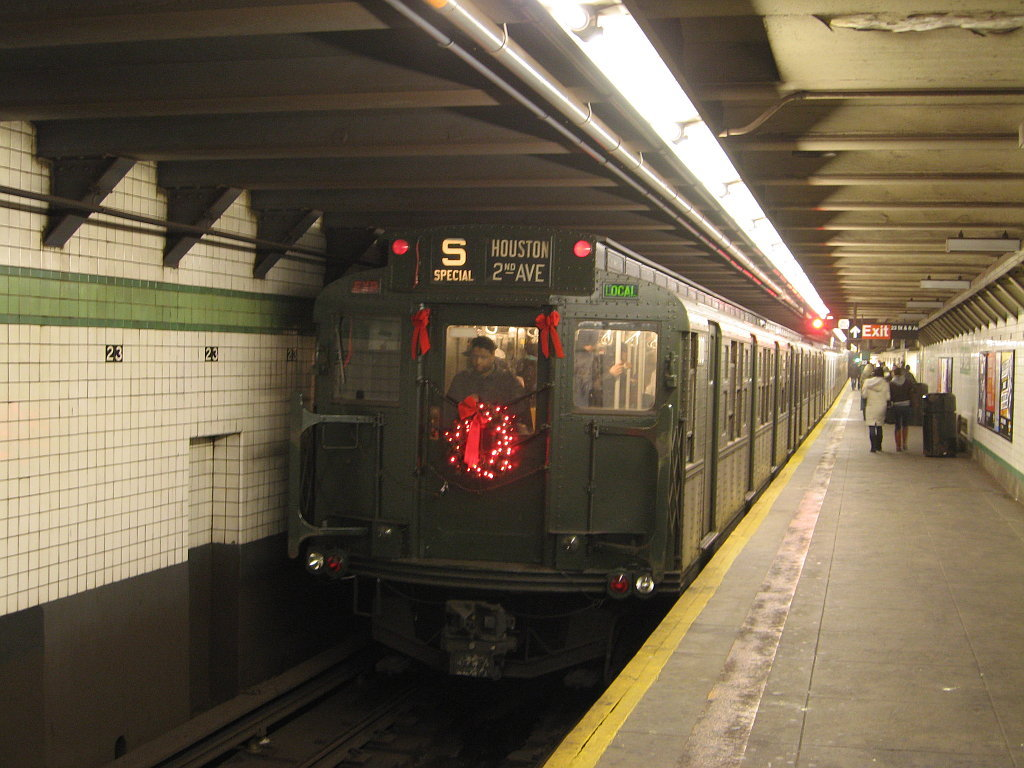
The "Holiday Shopper's Special", a train of R1, R4, R6, R7A, and R9 subway cars running in special service at the 23rd Street station on the IND Sixth Avenue Line

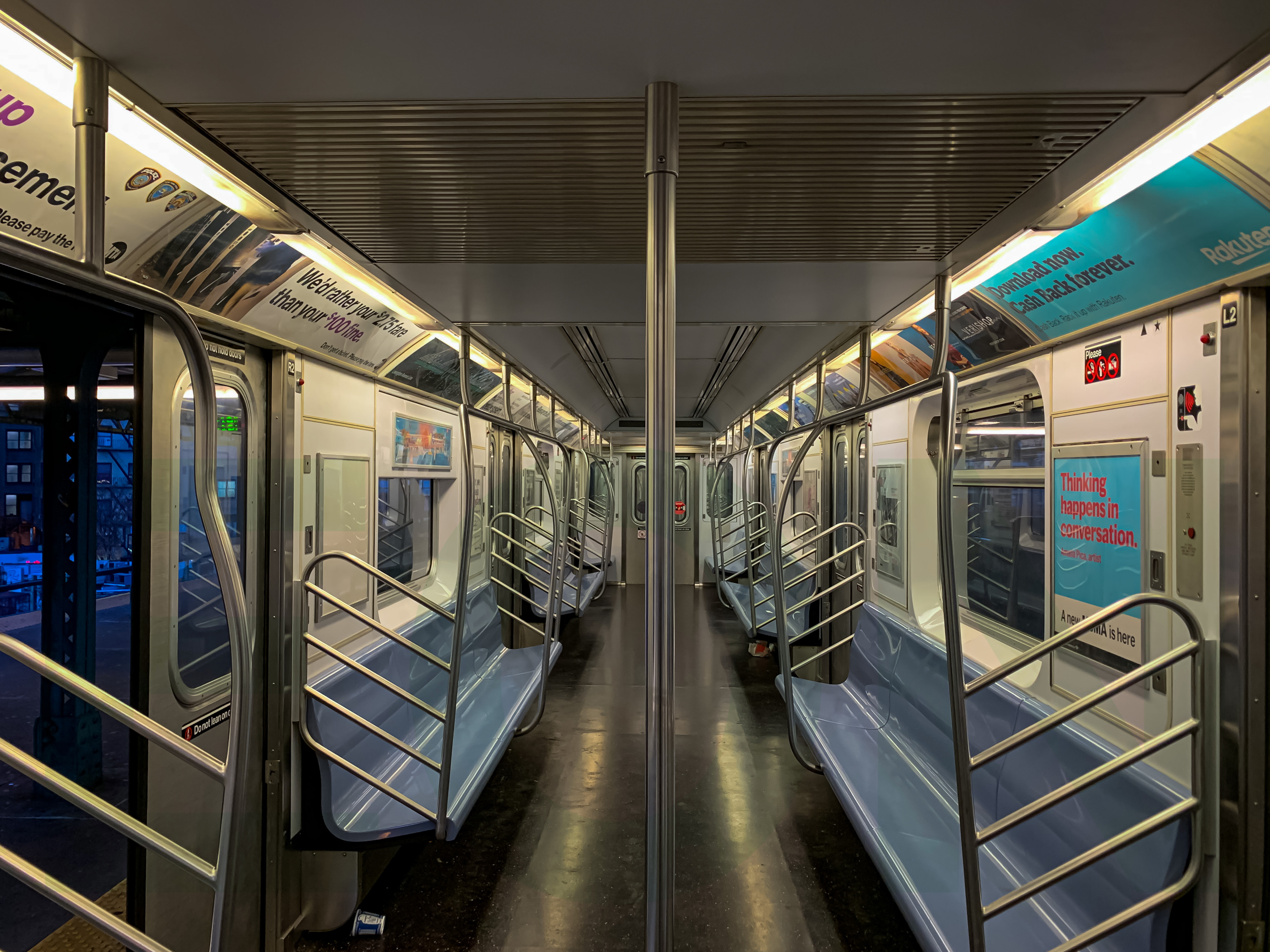
An R142A series car interior in service on the 4 route

The New York City Subway is a large rapid transit system and has a large fleet of electric multiple unit rolling stock. As of September 2024, the New York City Subway has 6712 cars on the roster.

The system maintains two separate fleets of passenger cars: one for the A Division (numbered) routes, the other for the B Division (lettered) routes. All A Division equipment is approximately 8 feet 9 inches (2.67 m) wide and 51 feet (15.54 m) long. B Division cars, on the other hand, are about 10 feet (3.05 m) wide and either 60 feet 6 inches (18.44 m) or 75 feet 6 inches (23.01 m) long. The A Division and B Division trains operate only in their own division; operating in the other division is not allowed. All rolling stock, in both the A and B Divisions, run on the same 4 foot 8.5 inches (1,435 mm) standard gauge and use the same third-rail geometry and voltage. Most revenue trains consist of between eight and ten cars, although some have as few as two cars and some as many as eleven.

The subway's rolling stock have operated under various companies: the Interborough Rapid Transit (IRT), Brooklyn–Manhattan Transit (BMT), and Independent Subway System (IND), all of which have since merged into the New York City Transit Authority. Cars purchased by the City of New York since the inception of the IND and for the other divisions beginning in 1948 are identified by the letter "R" followed by a number. Various kinds of cars are also used for maintenance work, including flatcars and vacuum trains.

== Current fleet ==
As of September 2024, the New York City Subway has 6712 cars on the roster. The system maintains two separate fleets of passenger cars: one for the A Division routes, the other for the B Division routes. There are 2,890 A Division cars and 3,822 B Division cars as of September 2024. All A Division equipment is approximately 8 feet 9 inches (2.67 m) wide and 51 feet (15.54 m) long. B Division cars are larger, about 10 feet (3.05 m) wide and either 60 feet 6 inches (18.44 m) or 75 feet 6 inches (23.01 m) long. The 75-foot cars, the R46s, R68s, and R68As, are not permitted on BMT Eastern Division – the J, L, M, and Z trains – because of sharper curves on those tracks. A typical revenue train consists of 8 or 10 cars. The exceptions are the Franklin Avenue Shuttle, which runs 2-car trains; the Rockaway Park Shuttle, which runs 4- and 5-car trains; the 42nd Street Shuttle, which runs 6-car trains; the G, which runs 5-car trains; and the 7, which runs 11-car trains.

All rolling stock, in both the A and B Divisions, run on the same 4 foot 8.5 inches (1,435 mm) standard gauge and use the same third-rail geometry and voltage. However, trains operate only in their own division; operating in the other division is not allowed. A Division sections have narrower tunnel segments, tighter curves, and tighter platform clearances than the B Division sections, so B Division trains cannot fit in the A Division tunnels and stations, while A Division trains would have an unacceptably large gap between the platform and train if they were allowed in service on B Division lines. Also, the safety train stop (trip cock) mechanism is not compatible between divisions, being located on opposite sides of the track and train in each division. However, service and maintenance trains are composed of A Division-sized cars, so they can operate with either division's clearances and have safety train stops installed on both sides of the trucks.

=== New Technology Trains ===
Newer rolling stock from the past two decades are part of the New Technology Train family, with the goal of introducing modern technology when replacing older rolling stock. They all feature digital signage, bench seating, improved operator controls, and are compatible with communications-based train control signalling. By January 2022, various older B Division cars, such as the entire fleets of R32s, R38s, R40s, R40As, R42s, and NYCT R44s, were retired and replaced by these newer models.

=== General Overhaul Program ===
The General Overhaul Program (GOH) was a mid-life overhaul program for neglected subway cars, which involved a thorough rebuilding of the fleet. Since the completion of the GOH program, the new Scheduled Maintenance System (SMS) program has replaced the GOH program by ensuring that trains do not reach a state in which they would need such an overhaul. The car types, which were part of the MTA NYCT GOH program, are the IRT Redbirds (R26, R28, R29, R33, R33S, R36), as well as IND/BMT cars (R30 GE, R32, R38, R40, R40A, R42, R44, and R46). These cars were rebuilt between 1985 and 1993. Some cars in various classes from R10 to R46 were also given lighter overhauls during this period.

=== "R"-prefixed orders ===
Cars purchased by the City of New York since the inception of the IND and for the other divisions beginning in 1948 are identified by the letter "R" followed by a number, e.g., R46. This number is the contract number under which the cars were purchased. Cars with nearby contract numbers (e.g., R1 through R9, or R21 through R36, or R143 through R179) may be virtually identical, simply being purchased under different contracts.

The New York City Board of Transportation settled on a system of documentation that is still in place under MTA New York City Transit. This included a prefix letter or letters that indicated the department that the specific documentation, followed by a series of numbers of a length defined by the specific department concerned. For example, the Surface Department used the letter "S", while the Rapid Transit Department used the letter "R". A new R- number is assigned for any vehicle purchase involving a bidding process. Since the 1970s, the system has suffered from "R- inflation" going through only 46 R- numbers in its first 40 years, but over 114 in its subsequent 30. Possible reasons include an increased number of specialized maintenance vehicles that were previously made in house or a lower floor for requiring a formal bidding process to reduce waste and abuse.

=== Fleet listing ===
Contract #	Division	Year built	Builder	Car Length	Car Width	Photograph	Fleet numbers (Total ordered)	Number in service	CBTC	Assigned Services	Yard assignment	Notes
R44	B	1971–1973	St. Louis Car	75 feet (22.9 m)	10 feet (3.0 m)		388–435; 436–466 (even numbers only) (64 total)	32 (contingency fleet only)	ATC	(reserve only)	Clifton	Single cars; even numbered cars ("A" cars) have single full-width cabs, odd numbered cars ("B" cars) have blind ends.; New York City Subway car numbers were originally 100–387 and renumbered 5202–5479.; New York City Subway cars retired.; Staten Island R44 railway cars fully phased out in 2025, and replaced with a full fleet of R211S cars.
R46	B	1975–1978	Pullman	75 feet (22.9 m)	10 feet (3.0 m)		5482–6207 (4-car sets); 6208–6258 (even numbers only) (754 total)	96	No	(Updated June 30, 2024)	Coney Island; Pitkin	5482–6207 are in A-B-B-A configuration as 4-car sets.; Even-numbered cars have single full-width cabs, and are known as "A" cars; Odd-numbered cars have blind ends, and are known as "B" cars.; 6208–6258 are in A-A configuration (even numbers only).; Car numbers were originally 500–1227 and 1228–1278 (even numbers only).; Two cars (941 & 1054) wrecked and scrapped prior to General Overhaul.; Currently being replaced.
R62	A	1983–1985	Kawasaki	51 feet (15.5 m)	8 feet 9 inches (2.7 m)		1301–1625 (325 total)	315	No	(Updated June 30, 2024)	Livonia	Originally single cars, now 5-car sets.; 10 cars (1366–1370, 1435–1437, 1439–1440) retired.; 1366–1370 were wrecked in 2000 due to an accident. Car 1369 was scrapped in 2005. Car 1366 and half of car 1370 are at the FDNY Randall's Island training center. Cars 1367 and 1368 were reefed in 2008.; 1435–1437 and 1439–1440 were wrecked in 1991 due to a derailment. 1437 and 1439–1440 were scrapped in 2001. Car 1436 was reefed in 2008. 1438 is now part of a 5-car set with 1431–1434.
R62A	A	1984–1987	Bombardier	51 feet (15.5 m)	8 feet 9 inches (2.7 m)		1651–2475 (825 total)	823	No	(Updated June 30, 2024)	240th Street; Livonia; Westchester	Originally single cars, most cars linked in 5 or 6-car sets.; 1651–1905, 1961–2475, and select other 1900s have full-width cabs at ends of sets.; 1909 was wrecked and scrapped.; 2176 was wrecked in 2024 sideswipe and derailment.
R68	B	1986–1988	Westinghouse-Amrail	75 feet (22.9 m)	10 feet (3.0 m)		2500–2924 (425 total)	421	No	(Updated June 30, 2024)	Concourse; Coney Island	2500–2915 originally single cars, now in 4-car sets.; 2916–2924 still single cars; used for the Franklin Avenue Shuttle.
R68A	B	1988–1989	Kawasaki	75 feet (22.9 m)	10 feet (3.0 m)		5001–5200 (200 total)	200	No	(Updated June 30, 2024)	Coney Island	Originally single cars, now in 4-car sets.
R142	A	1999–2003	Bombardier	51 feet (15.5 m)	8 feet 9 inches (2.7 m)		1101–1250, 6301–7180 (1,030 total)	1,025	Planned	(Updated June 30, 2024)	East 180th Street; 239th Street; Jerome	All cars are sequentially numbered in A-B-B-B-A configuration as 5-car sets.; Cars ending in 1, 5, 6, and 0 have single full-width cabs and are known as "A" cars.; Cars ending in all other digits have no cabs and are known as "B" cars.; Cars 6346–6350 were taken out of service after suffering fire damage in an arson attack.
R142A	A	1999–2005	Kawasaki	51 feet (15.5 m)	8 feet 9 inches (2.7 m)		7591–7810 (220 total)	220	Planned	(Updated June 30, 2024)	Jerome	All cars are sequentially numbered in A-B-B-B-A configuration as 5-car sets.; Cars ending in 1, 5, 6, and 0 have single full-width cabs and are known as "A" cars.; Cars ending in all other digits have no cabs and are known as "B" cars.; Original order was 7211–7810; cars 7211–7590 were converted to R188s between 2010 & 2016 for the IRT Flushing Line.
R143	B	2001–2003	Kawasaki	60 feet (18.3 m)	10 feet (3.0 m)		8101–8312 (212 total)	212	Yes	(Updated June 30, 2024)	East New York	All cars are sequentially numbered in A-B-B-A configuration.; Cars with single full-width cabs are known as A cars.; Cars with no cab are known as B cars.
R160	B	2005–2010	Alstom (R160A); Kawasaki (R160B)	60 feet (18.3 m)	10 feet (3.0 m)		8313–9974 (1,662 total)	1,662	Yes	(Updated June 30, 2024) (1 train is also used in Q service during morning rush, but is shown in the R assignment) (Updated June 30, 2024)	East New York; Jamaica	4-car sets (8313–8652, 9943–9974) are sequentially numbered in A-B-B-A configuration. All are classified under R160A-1 and are powered by Alstom ONIX 800 IGBT–VVVF.; 5-car sets (8653–9942) are sequentially numbered in A-B-B-B-A configuration.; 8653–8712, 9233–9802 are classified under R160A-2 and are powered by Alstom ONIX 800 IGBT–VVVF.; 8713–8842, 9103–9232, 9803–9942 are classified under R160B-1 and are powered by Alstom ONIX 800 IGBT–VVVF.; 8843–9102 are classified under R160B-2 and are powered by Siemens SITRAC IGBT–VVVF.; Cars with single full-width cabs are known as "A" cars.; Cars with no cabs are known as "B" cars.
R188	A	2010–2016	Kawasaki	51 feet (15.5 m)	8 feet 9 inches (2.7 m)		7211–7590, 7811–7936 (506 total)	506	Yes	(Updated June 30, 2024)	Corona	All cars are in 5-car or 6-car sets to form 11-car trains for IRT Flushing Line service.; Order consists of a combination of 126 new cars & R142A conversions by the manufacturer, totaling 380 car conversions.; Conversion sets numbered 7211–7590 are numbered as follows: Cars ending in 0, 1, 5, and 6 have single full-width cabs and are known as "A" cars.; Cars ending in all other digits have no cabs and are known as "B" cars.; Cars 7811–7898 are eight new 11-car trains (split into four 5-car trains and four 6-car trains), with cars sequentially numbered.; Cars whose numbers give a remainder of 0, 1, 5, and 6 when divided by 11 have single full-width cabs and are known as "A" cars.; Cars whose numbers give other remainders when divided by 11 have no cabs and are known as "B" cars.; Cars 7899–7936 are "C" cars that link with converted R142A sets to expand the sets to six cars.
R179	B	2016–2019	Bombardier	60 feet (18.3 m)	10 feet (3.0 m)		3010–3327 (318 total)	318	Yes	(Updated June 30, 2024)	East New York; 207th Street	4-car sets (3050–3237) are sequentially numbered in A-B-B-A configuration.; 5-car sets (3010–3049, 3238–3327) are sequentially numbered in A-B-B-B-A configuration.; Cars with single full-width cabs are known as A cars.; Cars with no cab are known as B cars.
R211T	B	2021	Kawasaki	60 feet (18.3 m)	10 feet (3.0 m)		4040–4059 (+80 cars TBD) (100 total)	20	Yes	"G" train	Coney Island	All cars are sequentially numbered in A-B-B-B-A configuration as 5-car sets.; Cars ending in 0, 4, 5, and 9 have single full-width cabs and are known as "A" cars.; Cars ending in all other digits have no cabs and are known as "B" cars.
R211A	B	2021–present	Kawasaki	60 feet (18.3 m)	10 feet (3.0 m)		3400–4039, 4060–4499 (+355 cars TBD) (1,435 total)	1,075	Yes	"A" train "B" train "C" train "D" train "G" train Rockaway Park Shuttle	Pitkin; Coney Island; Concourse	All cars are sequentially numbered in A-B-B-B-A configuration as 5-car sets.; Cars ending in 0, 4, 5, and 9 have single full-width cabs and are known as "A" cars.; Cars ending in all other digits have no cabs and are known as "B" cars.
R211S	B	2022–2024	Kawasaki	60 feet (18.3 m)	10 feet (3.0 m)		100–174 (75 total)	75	ATC	Staten Island Railway	Clifton	All cars are sequentially numbered in A-B-B-B-A configuration as 5-car sets.; Cars ending in 0, 4, 5, and 9 have single full-width cabs and are known as "A" cars.; Cars ending in all other digits have no cabs and are known as "B" cars.

== Maintenance vehicles ==
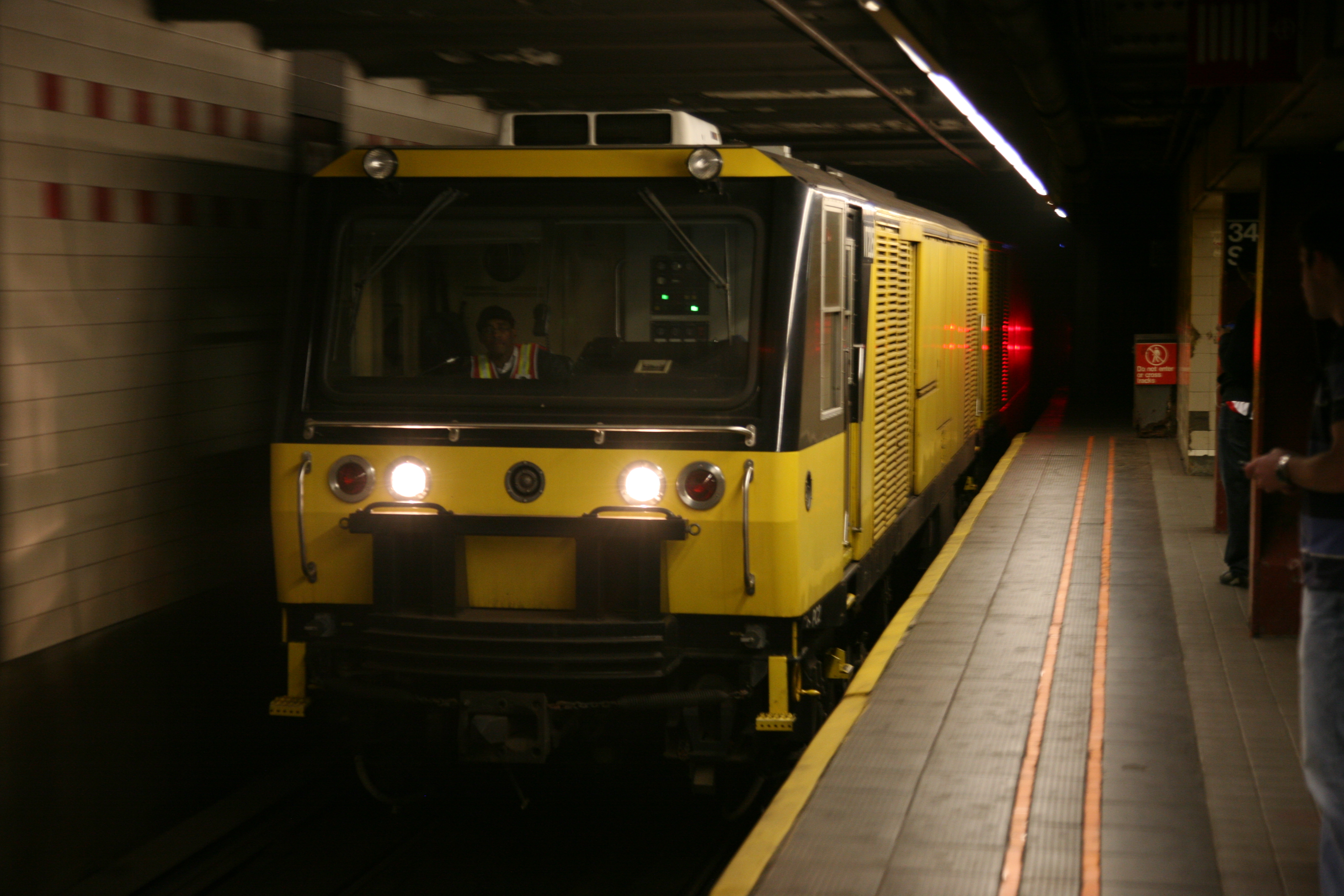
A Vaktrak track vacuuming train

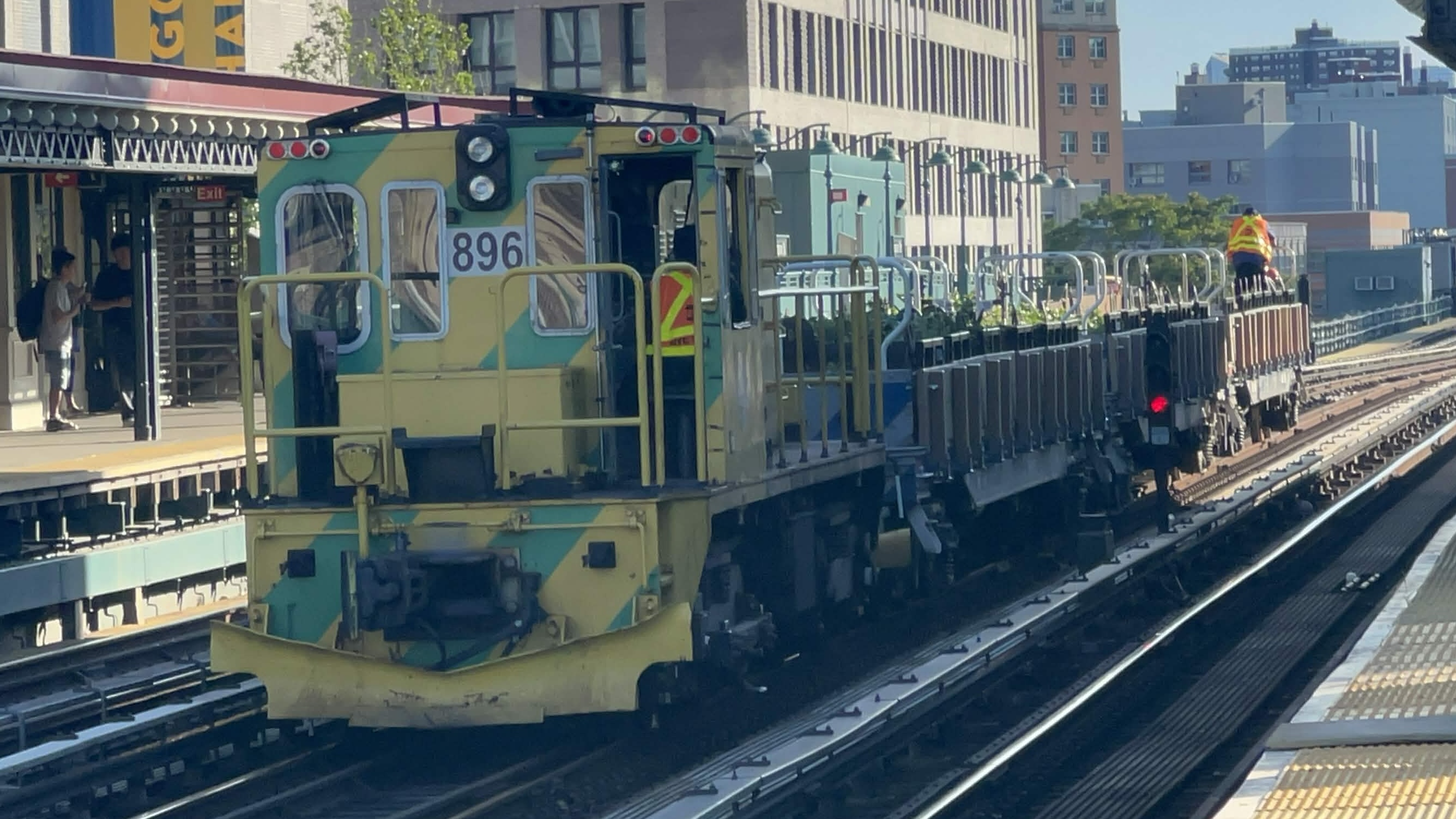
GE SL-50 (R77) diesel locomotive

Various kinds of cars are used for maintenance work, including flatcars and vacuum trains.

=== Track geometry car ===
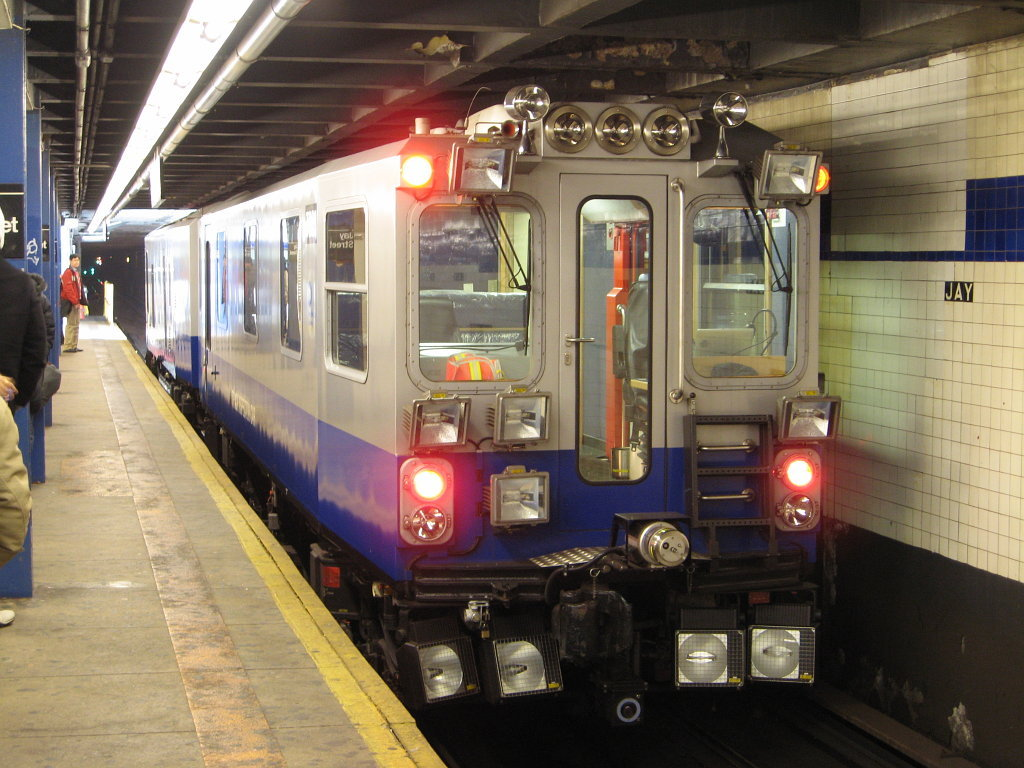
The track geometry car at Jay Street–MetroTech.

There are four track geometry cars on the New York City Subway that measure the system's track geometry to ensure that safe train operation is maintained. The cars are numbered TGC1–TGC4. TGC1 was ordered under contract R59 in 1984 for $1.4 million, TGC2 was ordered under contract R63 and cost $2.5 million. Contract R-34152 purchasing TGC3 was awarded on December 29, 2004, for $9,610,963, and after additional funding was later authorized by the Board, Modification 1 exercising the Option for TGC4 was awarded on January 18, 2006, for $9,622,858. Subsequent modifications added newer equipment, such as a more advanced laser scanner, to TGC4 prior to its delivery to NYCTA. The cars use sensors, measuring systems, and data management systems to get a profile of the tracks. The train crew consists of two-track equipment maintainers, one maintenance supervisor, and two to three engineers. The trains typically operate during off-peak weekday daytime hours so as to not interfere with more frequent rush hour service. A single car weighs 45 tons. The cars measure:

- Alignment – "Alignment is the projection of the track geometry of each rail or the track center line onto the horizontal plane," (FRA Definition). Also known as the "straightness" of the tracks.
- Crosslevel – The variation in the cant of the track over the length of a predetermined "chord" length (generally 62 feet or 18.90 meters). On straight or tangent track, ideally, there should be no variation, while on curves, a cant is generally desired.
- Curvature – The amount by which the rail deviates from being straight or tangent. The geometry car checks the actual curvature (in Degree of curvature) of a curve versus its design curvature.
- Rail gauge – The distance between the rails. Over time, rail may become too wide or too narrow. In North America and most of the world, standard gauge is 4 ft 8½ in (1,435 mm).
- Rail profile – Looks for rail wear and deviations from standard profile.
- Warp – The maximum change in crosslevel over a predetermined chord length (generally sixty-two feet).
- Corrugation of running rail surface
- Tunnel and station platform clearances
- Third rail height and gauge
- Vertical gap between third rail and protective board

The track geometry car typically checks each stretch of track about 6 times a year; the car is manually operated, and there are no plans to automate inspection of the track geometry, which is done manually with the help of high-tech equipment aboard the car.

== Future fleet ==
Contract #	Division	Year built	Builder	Total	Photograph (mock-up or rendering)	Notes
R262	A	TBA	TBA	1,140 cars (proposed); 2,390 cars (all options exercised)		To replace all R62s, R62As, R142s, and R142As. CBTC-equipped. Some cars are expected to feature open gangways. Originally 504 cars for the base and 1,364 cars with all options.
R268	B	2028–2030	Kawasaki	378 cars		To replace all R68As and remaining R68s. Will use the design of the R211 fleet, with 290 cars in 5-car sets and the other 88 cars in 4-car sets. Originally for 355 cars.

== History ==
When the Brooklyn Rapid Transit Company entered into agreements to operate some of the new subway lines, they decided to design a new type of car, 10 feet (3.05 m) wide and 67 feet (20.42 m) long. The subject of several patents, the car's larger profile was similar to that of steam railroad coaches, permitting greater passenger capacity, more comfortable seating, and other advantages. The BRT unveiled its design, designated BMT Standard, to the public in 1913 and received such wide acceptance that all future subway lines, whether built for the BRT, the IRT, or eventually the IND, were built to handle the wider cars.

When the R44s and R46s were rebuilt, the rollsigns on the side of the cars were replaced with electronic LCD signs while the front service sign remained as a rollsign. In sharp contrast, the rebuilt R32s and R38s retained rollsigns on the sides, but a flip-dot display was placed in the front. Between 1984 and 1989, some of the IRT trains were painted red, giving them the name Redbirds. (Note: Redbirds are R26, R28, R29, R33, and R36. All of these cars were replaced by more modern subway trains (R142/R142As) between 2001 and 2003, though many R33 cars are still in use as work trains. Sometimes, the term "Redbird" would also be used on the R27 and R30 cars as they were repainted Gunn red during the late 1980s and early 1990s before their retirement in 1993. These were known as the BMT Redbirds. Sixteen R17s were also given this paint scheme in 1985/86, but were retired by 1988, well before the name "Redbird" caught on.)

== Retired fleet ==
Old cars, some from the original companies (IRT, BMT, and IND), are preserved at the New York Transit Museum, while others have been sold to private individuals and/or other railway/trolley museums. Private companies and organisations include Railway Preservation Corp. whose equipment is kept at Coney Island Overhaul Complex and is often used on New York Transit Museum-sponsored excursions and the Illinois Railway Museum which maintains the donated Rolling Stock they receive from various Transportation Services and Organisations, including the New York City Transit Authority and runs them in their private train tracks.

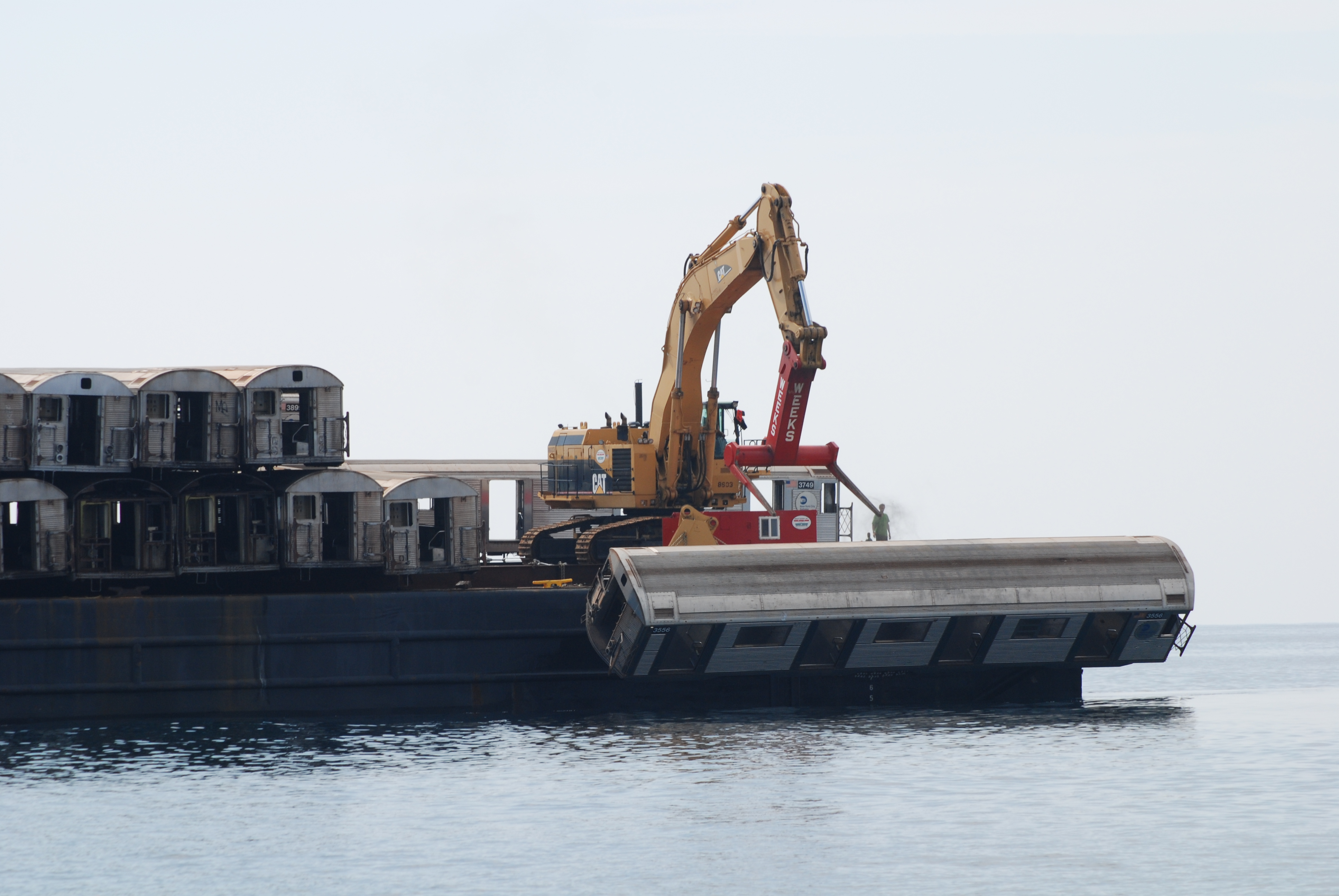
Many different subway cars being dropped off a barge into the Atlantic Ocean.

In 2001, the New York City Transit Authority started disposing of retired subway cars by dumping them at sea to create artificial reefs, with the intention of promoting marine life. This option was chosen because it was less expensive than removing asbestos from the cars; the asbestos was determined to not be a hazard in the ocean.

The artificial reefs would provide environmental and economic benefits, such as providing shelter for marine animals and creating new fishing opportunities. The first reef constructed was Redbird Reef at Slaughter Beach. Eventually, multiple states received retired subway cars for reefs. The program was discontinued in 2010, after more than 2,500 cars were reefed, because newer cars contained more plastic, which was too expensive to economically remove before reefing.

=== IRT Pre-Unification listing ===
Designation	Year built	Builder	Fleet total	Car numbers	Year retired	Denotes
Composite	1903–1904	Jewett, St. Louis Car, Stephenson, Wason	500	2000–2159, 3000–3339	1916; 1950	2000–2159: Non-powered trailers Retired from subway service in 1916; re-equipped with lightweight trucks and components and continued in elevated service until 1950.
Hi-V "Gibbs"	1904–1905	ACF	300	3350–3649	1958	
Hi-V "Deck Roof"	1907–1908	ACF	50	3650–3699	1958	
Hi-V "Hedley"	1910–1911	ACF, Standard Steel, Pressed Steel	325	ACF: 3700–3809; SS: 3810–3849; PS: 3850–4024	1958	
Hi-V "Hedley"	1915	Pullman	292	4223–4514	1958	Non-powered trailers 4223–4250 in their last years were motorized as blind motors with no controls.
Lo-V "Flivver"	1915	Pullman	178	4037–4214	1962	Were built with the original trucks and electrical components removed from the Composites.
Lo-V "Steinway"	1915–1916	Pullman	113	4025–4036, 4215–4222, 4555–4576, 4700–4770	1963	Equipped with special gearing for the steep grades of the Steinway Tunnels.
Lo-V "Standard"	1916–1917	Pullman	695	4515–4554, 4577–4699, 4771–5302	1964	4515–4554 and 4811–4965 were non-powered trailers
Lo-V "Standard"	1922	Pullman	100	5303–5402	1969	Non-powered trailers 5303–5377 equipped with air compressors for brakes
Lo-V "Standard"	1924–1925	ACF	225	5403–5627	1964	
Lo-V "Steinway"	1925	ACF	25	5628–5652	1969	Equipped with special gearing for the steep grades of the Steinway Tunnels.
Lo-V "World's Fair"	1938	St. Louis Car	50	5653–5702	1969	Single-ended cars used for the 1939 World's Fair.

=== BMT Pre-Unification listing ===
Designation	Year built	Builder	Fleet total	Car numbers	Year retired	Denotes
AB Standard	1914–1919	ACF	600	2000–2599	1969	
AB Standard	1920–1922	Pressed Steel	300	2600–2899	1969	
AB Standard	1924	Pressed Steel	50	4000–4049	1969	Non-powered trailers
BMT-SIRT (ME-1)	1925–1926	Standard Steel	25	2900–2924	1961	25 motor cars purchased from the Staten Island Railway in 1953–1954.
D-type Triplex	1925–1928	Pressed Steel	121	6000–6120	1965	
Green Hornet	1934	Pullman	1	7003	1941	Experimental unit; scrapped in 1942 for World War II.
Zephyr	1934	Budd	1	7029	1954	Experimental unit
Multi	1936	St. Louis Car	10	7004–7013	1961	
Multi	1936	Pullman	15	7014–7028	1961	
Bluebird	1938–1940	Clark	6	8000–8005	1955	

=== R-type listing ===
Contract #	Year built	Division	Builder	Photograph	Fleet total	Car numbers	Year retired
R1	1930–1931	IND	ACF		300	100–399	1976
R4	1932–1933	IND	ACF		500	400–899	1977
R-6-3	1935–1936	IND	ACF		250	900–1149	1977
R-6-2	1936	IND	Pullman		150	1150–1299	1977
R-6-1	1936	IND	Pressed Steel		100	1300–1399	1977
R7	1937	IND	ACF, Pullman		150	ACF: 1400–1474, Pullman: 1475–1549	1977
R7A	1938	IND	ACF, Pullman		100	Pullman: 1550–1599, ACF: 1600–1649	1977
R9	1940	IND, BMT	ACF, Pressed Steel		153	ACF: 1650–1701, PS: 1702–1802	1977
R10	1948–1949	IND, BMT	ACF		400	1803–1852 (Note: Car number series selected to bracket pre-unification BMT number series (1853–2999). Renumbered to 2950–2999 in 1970); 3000–3349	1989
R11	1949	IND, BMT	Budd		10	8010–8019	1977
R11	Test trains; rebuilt into R34 cars in 1965.						
R12	1948	IRT	ACF		100	5703–5802 (Note: Car number series to continue from pre-unification IRT number series (5702).)	1981
R14	1949	IRT	ACF		150	5803–5952	1984
R15	1950	IRT	ACF		100	5953–5999, 6200–6252	1984
R16	1954–1955	BMT, IND	ACF		200	6300–6499	1987
R17	1954–1956	IRT	St. Louis Car		400	6500–6899	1988
R21	1956–1957	IRT	St. Louis Car		250	7050–7299	1987
R22	1957–1958	IRT	St. Louis Car		450	7300–7749	1987
R26	1959–1960	IRT	ACF		110	7750–7859	2002
R26	Semi-married pairs Even-numbered cars have motor-generator and battery, odd-numbered cars have air compressor.						
R27	1960–1961	IND, BMT	St. Louis Car		230	8020–8249	1990
R27	Married pairs Even-numbered cars have motor-generator and battery, odd-numbered cars have air compressor.						
R28	1960–1961	IRT	ACF		100	7860–7959	2002
R28	Semi-married pairs Even-numbered cars have motor-generator and battery, odd-numbered cars have air compressor.						
R29	1962	IRT	St. Louis Car		236	8570–8805	2002
R29	Married pairs Even-numbered cars have motor-generator and battery, odd-numbered cars have air compressor. Rebuilt into R99 cars from 1985 to 1987.						
R30	1961–1962	IND, BMT	St. Louis Car		320	R30: 8250–8351; 8412–8569; R30A: 8352–8411	1993
R30	Married pairs Even-numbered cars have motor-generator and battery, odd-numbered cars have air compressor.						
R32	1964–1965	IND, BMT	Budd		600	R32: 3350–3649; R32A: 3650–3949 (Note: Car 3659 was renumbered to 3348 after being converted to an even-numbered car.)	2022
R32	Married pairs Even-numbered cars have motor-generator and battery, odd-numbered cars have air compressor.						
R33	1962–1963	IRT	St. Louis Car		500	8806–9305	2003
R33	Married pairs Even-numbered cars have motor-generator and battery, odd-numbered cars have air compressor.						
R33S	1963	IRT	St. Louis Car		40	9306–9345	2003
R33S	Single cars, built for IRT Flushing Line						
R34	see R11						
R36	1963–1964	IRT	St. Louis Car		424	9346–9769	2003
R36	Married pairs Even-numbered cars have motor-generator and battery, odd-numbered cars have air compressor.						
R38	1966–1967	IND, BMT	St. Louis Car		200	3950–4149	2009
R38	Married pairs Even-numbered cars have motor-generator and battery, odd-numbered cars have air compressor.						
R39	Never built	IRT, BMT	Intended to replace old equipment running on the BMT Myrtle Avenue Line and the IRT Third Avenue Line; Would have been built to IRT dimensions of the R38 and ordered in the late 1960s or early 1970s Order scrapped when the Myrtle Avenue Line south of the BMT Jamaica Line was discontinued in 1969 and the remaining Third Avenue Line in 1973; The Budd Company used a possible outline of this car as U.S. patent 3,151,538.				
R40	1967– 1968	IND, BMT	St. Louis Car		200	4150–4349	2009
R40	Slanted ends, married pairs Even-numbered cars have motor-generator and battery, odd-numbered cars have air compressor. Car numbers were originally 4150–4249, 4350–4449						
R40A	1968–1969	IND, BMT	St. Louis Car		200	4350–4549	2009
R40A	Married pairs Even-numbered cars have motor-generator and battery, odd-numbered cars have air compressor. Car numbers were originally 4250–4349 (straight ends), 4450–4549 (slanted ends)						
R42	1969–1970	IND, BMT	St. Louis Car		400	4550–4949	2020
R42	Married pairs Even-numbered cars have motor-generator and battery, odd-numbered cars have air compressor.						
R44 (NYCT cars)	1971–1973	IND, BMT	St. Louis Car		288	100–387	2010 (NYCT cars)
R44 (NYCT cars)	4-car sets (A-B-B-A) formation. A cars have cabs on one end, while B cars have no cabs. Car numbers were originally 100–387. 278 cars were renumbered to 5202–5479 between 1991 & 1993.						
R55	Never built	IND, BMT	The R55 was a proposed car for the B Division (IND/BMT). It was considered in the early 1980s, but never left the drawing board. This order later evolved into the future R68.				
R99	see R29						
R110A	1992	IRT	Kawasaki		10	8001–8010	1998
R110A	(Built as Contract R130); New Technology demonstrator Cars ending in 1, 5, 6, and 0 have single full-width cabs, and are known as "A" cars. Cars ending in 2, 3, 4, 7, 8, and 9 have no cabs, and are known as "B" cars. All cars are sequentially numbered in A-B-B-B-A configuration as 5-car sets. All cars were converted to pump train cars between 2013 and 2022.						
R110B	1992	IND, BMT	Bombardier		9	3001–3009	2002
R110B	(Built as Contract R131); New Technology demonstrator, 67-foot (20 m) car Cars 3002, 3005, and 3008 have no cabs and were known as "B" cars. Other six cars have single full-width cabs, and are known as "A" cars. All cars are sequentially numbered in A-B-A configuration as 3-car sets. Cars 3002–3003 and 3009 are stored at 207th Street Yard. Car 3007 is preserved by the New York Transit Museum. Cars 3001, 3004–3006, and 3008 are at various facilities.						

== Miscellaneous ==
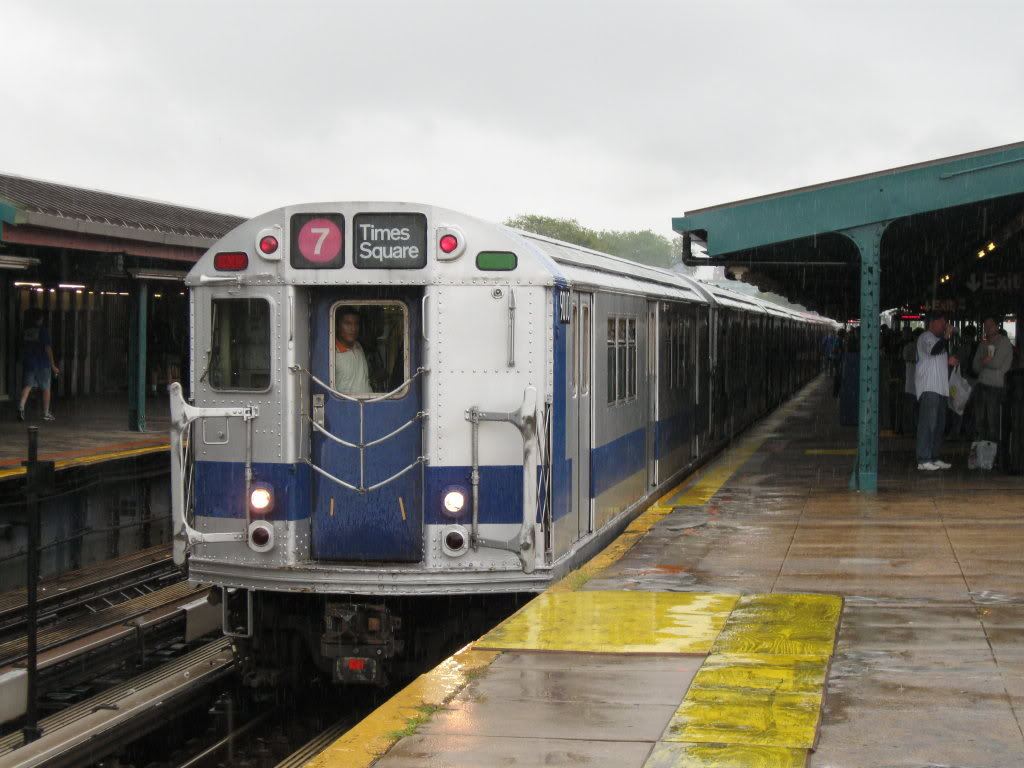
The "Train of Many Colors" makes another appearance on the 7 train in 2008, commemorating the last game at Shea Stadium

- Air conditioning is standard on all cars R42 and later. R38s 4140–4149 and R40s 4350–4549 were also delivered with A/C, and all cars not equipped with A/C from classes R26–R40 (with the exception of the R27, R30, and R33S) were later retrofitted with A/C. All active cars are equipped with air conditioning, and cars with malfunctioning air conditioning are not supposed to be put into service.
- During World War II, a group of late-19th-century New York elevated cars was sent west to the San Francisco Bay Area by the United States Maritime Commission for use by the Shipyard Railway, a temporary wartime electric line transporting workers to the Kaiser Shipyards. After the war, most were sold to be used as units in a local motel, but their whereabouts afterward is unknown. Two of them, however, were acquired and have been restored by the Western Railway Museum in Rio Vista, California.
- There are many examples of rolling stock built under contract that are not intended for revenue services, such as the R95 money train, R65 pump train, R127/R134 garbage train, and R156 work locomotive.
- After the September 11th attacks, an American flag decal was added to every active subway car in the system. This practice continued with new car orders through the early 2020s.
- The table below shows what year the TA had expected to retire several car models in 1981.

A Division fleet's planned retirement years
Car type	Year expected to retire	Actual retire- ment year
R26	1994	2002
R28	1995	2002
R29	1997	2002
R33	1998	2003
R36	1999	2003

B Division fleet's planned retirement years
Car type	Year expected to retire	Actual retire- ment year
R27	1995	1990
R30	1997	1993
R32	2000	2022
R38	2002	2009
R40	2003	2009
R42	2004	2020
R44	2007	2010, In-service (Note: The New York City Subway R44s were retired in 2010. The Staten Island Railway R44s are still in service.)
R46	2011	—N/a
