= R127/R134 (New York City Subway car) =

Class of New York City Subway work cars

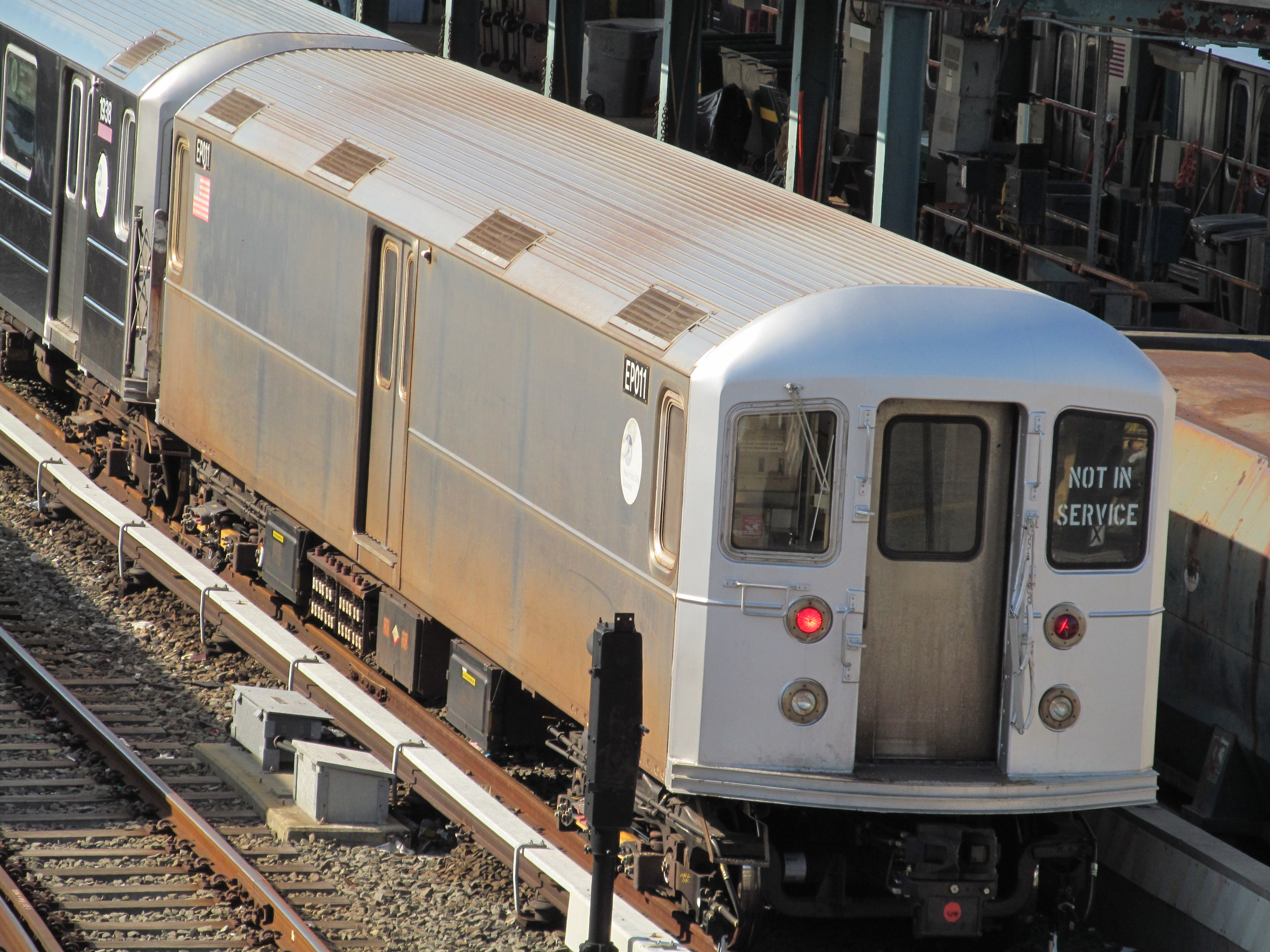
- R134 EP011 at Corona Yard

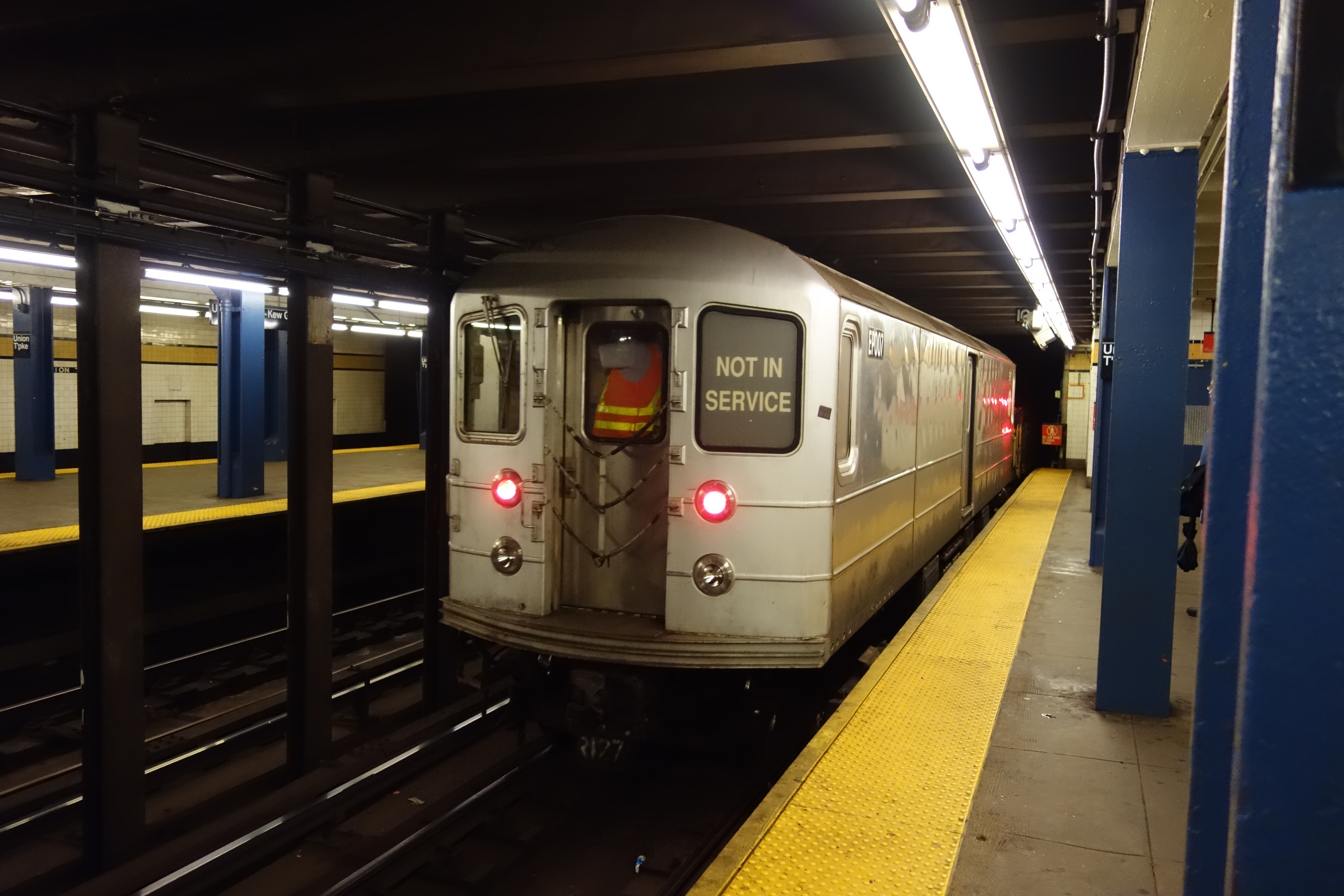
- R127 EP007 at Kew Gardens–Union Turnpike
- In service: R127 (1991–present); R134 (1994–present)
- Manufacturer: Kawasaki Heavy Industries
- Built at: Kobe, Japan
- Constructed: R127: 1990–1991; R134: 1994–1996
- Number built: R127: 10; R134: 8
- Number in service: 18 (work service only)
- Fleet numbers: R127: EP001–EP010; R134: EP011–EP018
- Operator: New York City Subway
- Depots: EP001–EP005, EP010, EP015, EP017: (239th Street Yard); EP006–EP009, EP011-EP013: (Corona Yard); EP014, EP016, EP018: (Coney Island Complex)

Specifications
- Car body construction: Stainless steel with fiberglass end bonnets
- Train length: 1 car train: 51.04 feet (15.56 m)
- Car length: 51.04 feet (15.56 m)
- Width: 8.60 feet (2,621 mm)
- Height: 11.89 feet (3,624 mm)
- Platform height: 3.65 ft (1.11 m)
- Doors: 2 sets of 50 inch wide side doors per car
- Maximum speed: 55 mph (89 km/h)
- Weight: 75,550 lb (34,270 kg)
- Traction system: General Electric SCM 17KG1924A1 propulsion with 4 GE 1257E1 motors per car
- Power output: 115 hp (85.8 kW) per axle
- Acceleration: 2.5 mph/s (4.0 km/(h⋅s))
- Auxiliaries: SAFT NIFE PR80F Battery; SAFT SMT8 Battery
- Electric systems: 625 V DC third rail
- Current collection: Contact shoe
- UIC classification: Bo’Bo’
- AAR wheel arrangement: B-B
- Braking systems: NYAB GSX23 Newtran “COBRA SMEE” Braking System; NYAB Tread Brake Unit
- Coupling system: Westinghouse H2C
- Track gauge: 4 ft 8 1/2 in (1,435 mm) standard gauge

The R127 and R134 are New York City Subway cars purpose-built by Kawasaki Heavy Industries in Kobe, Japan for work train service. The ten R127s, numbered EP001 to EP010, were built from 1990–1991, while the eight R134s, numbered EP011 to EP018, were built from 1994–1996.

The cars were built to the specifications of the subway's A Division (numbered routes), which are slightly narrower than those of the B Division (lettered routes), and are similar to the R62 and R62A passenger cars used on the A Division. However, they can be found on either division and are used as garbage train motors. They are not air-conditioned and instead have axiflow fans, resulting in these cars frequently replaced by air-conditioned passenger cars used on garbage trains in summer.
