= R188 (New York City Subway car) =

Class of New York City Subway car

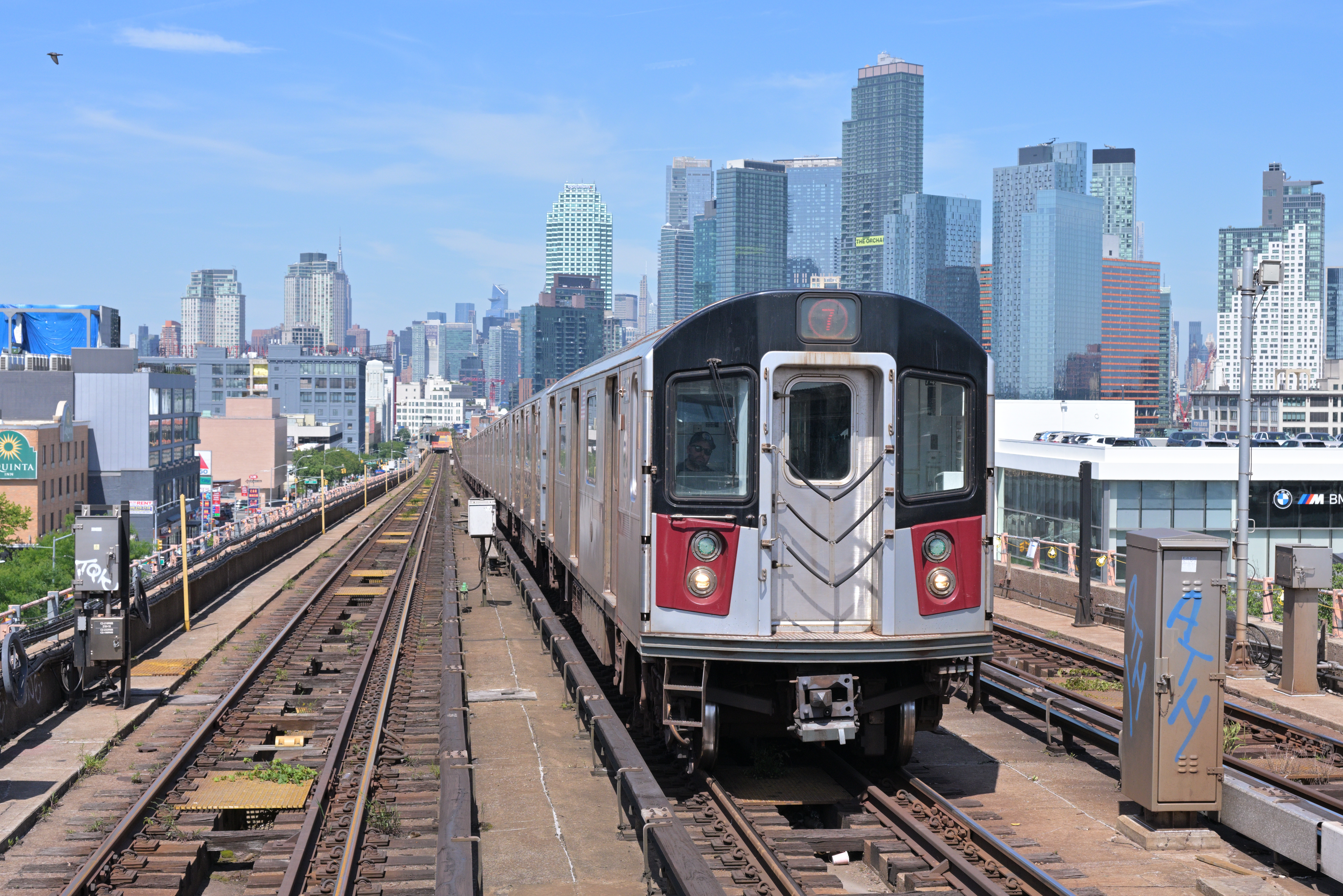
- An R188 train on the 7 route approaching 40th Street–Lowery Street station

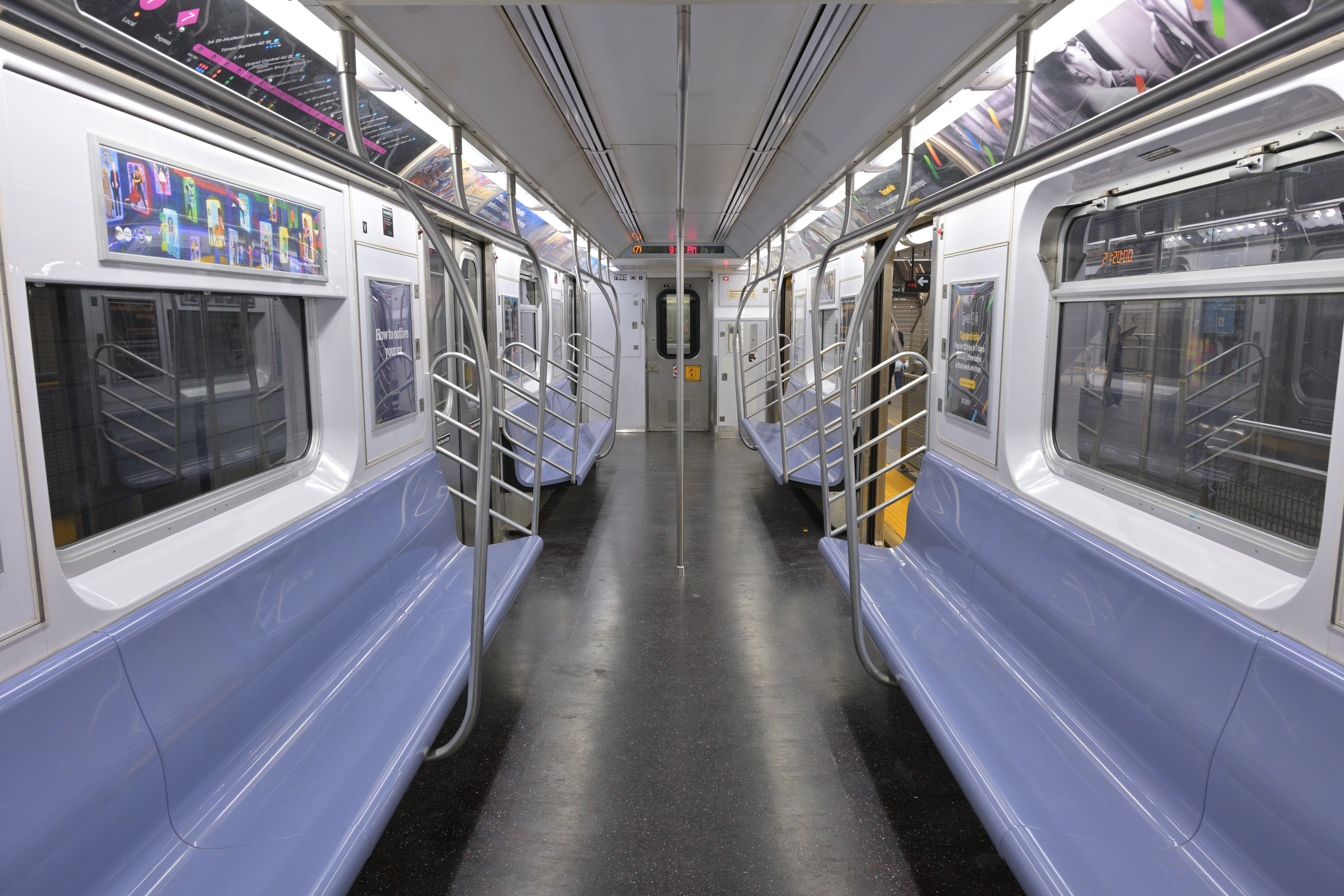
- Interior of a factory-built R188 car
- In service: November 9, 2013 – present (12 years)
- Manufacturer: Kawasaki Rail Car Company
- Built at: Yonkers, New York, US; Kobe, Hyōgo, Japan
- Family name: NTT (new technology train)
- Replaced: Displaced R62As on the 7 line
- Constructed: 2010–2016
- Entered service: November 9, 2013 (revenue service testing); December 15, 2013 (official service)
- Number built: 506 (126 new cars, 380 conversions)
- Number in service: 506
- Formation: 5-car sets (A-B-B-B-A); 6-car sets (A-C-B-B-B-A)
- Fleet numbers: R142A Conversion Sets: 7211–7590; New R188 Sets: 7811–7898; New R188 "C" Cars: 7899–7936
- Capacity: 176 (A car); 188 (B & C cars)
- Operator: New York City Subway
- Depot: Corona Yard
- Services assigned: (Updated June 30, 2024)

Specifications
- Car body construction: Stainless steel with fiberglass end bonnets
- Train length: 11 car train: 564 ft 8 in (172.11 m)
- Car length: 51 ft 4 in (15.65 m)
- Width: 8 ft 7 3/16 in (2,621 mm)
- Height: 11 ft 10 5/8 in (3,623 mm)
- Floor height: 3 ft 7 3/4 in (1.11 m)
- Platform height: 3 ft 7 3/4 in (1.11 m)
- Entry: Level
- Doors: 6 sets of 54 inch wide side doors per car
- Maximum speed: 66 mph (110 km/h) (design); 55 mph (89 km/h) (service)
- Weight: "A" car: 73,332 pounds (33,263 kg); "B" and "C" cars: 67,721 pounds (30,718 kg)
- Traction system: Bombardier PWM 2-level IGBT–VVVF
- Traction motors: 2 or 4 (Note: 4 on A cars, 2 on B & C cars) × Bombardier 1508C 150 hp (111.855 kW) 3-phase AC induction motor
- Power output: 2,100 hp (1,565.970 kW) (5-car set); 2,400 hp (1,789.680 kW) (6-car set)
- Acceleration: 2.5 mph/s (1.1 m/s^{2})
- Deceleration: 3.0 mph/s (1.3 m/s^{2}) (full service); 3.2 mph/s (1.4 m/s^{2}) (emergency)
- Electric systems: Third rail, 625 V DC
- Current collection: Contact shoe
- Braking systems: WABCO RT-96 tread brake system; Dynamic braking propulsion system.
- Safety systems: CBTC, dead man's switch, tripcock
- Headlight type: Halogen light bulb
- Track gauge: 4 ft 8 1/2 in (1,435 mm) standard gauge

The R188 is a class of new technology (NTT) New York City Subway cars built by Kawasaki Heavy Industries for the A Division. The fleet entered service in 2013, displacing the mid-1980s–era R62A cars that operated on the 7 and <7> services, in conjunction with the automation of the IRT Flushing Line's signal system with communications-based train control (CBTC). The R188 order also expanded the 7's fleet as part of the 7 Subway Extension, which opened in 2015.

Of the 506 cars in the fleet, only 126 were built brand-new; the remaining 380 cars were originally part of the R142A fleet that entered service in 2000, before being upgraded to R188s with the installation of CBTC equipment. The fleet first entered passenger service on November 9, 2013, and the final cars were delivered in June 2016.

== Description ==
The R188 fleet consists of 380 converted R142A cars and 126 brand-new cars. The converted R142As are numbered 7211–7590, as well as 126 brand-new cars numbered 7811–7936.

Cars 7211–7590 (380 cars) used to be R142As and were converted to R188s from 2010 to 2016, car numbers 7811–7898 (88 cars) are the new R188 cars built to supplement the increase in 7 service, and cars 7899–7936 (38 cars) are the new R188 "C" cars built to expand converted R142A sets from five cars to six cars (Most A Division lines use 10-car trains, while the 7 and <7> use 11-car trains, necessitating the addition of one new car to convert the sets).

The R188 contract was divided into two sub-orders: 33 main order cars (7211–7220, 7811–7832, and 7899) and 473 option order cars (7221–7590, 7833–7898 and 7900–7936).

Currently, all R188s are maintained at the Corona Yard and assigned to the 7 and <7>.

== Features ==
The R188s are equipped with modern control systems, HVAC, and public address systems. They are visually very similar to the R142s and nearly identical to the R142As, but due to electrical incompatibilities, in addition to being equipped with CBTC, the three types are not interoperable. Therefore, these cars are compatible only with the converted R142As that feature CBTC. The factory-made R188s are the first NTT trains to use LED interior lighting as opposed to fluorescent lighting in the R142As.

Like the R142s, R142As, and R143s, the R188s feature the electronic strip map with all stops on the 7 route. The maps have an indicator that can be set to either a local or express train.

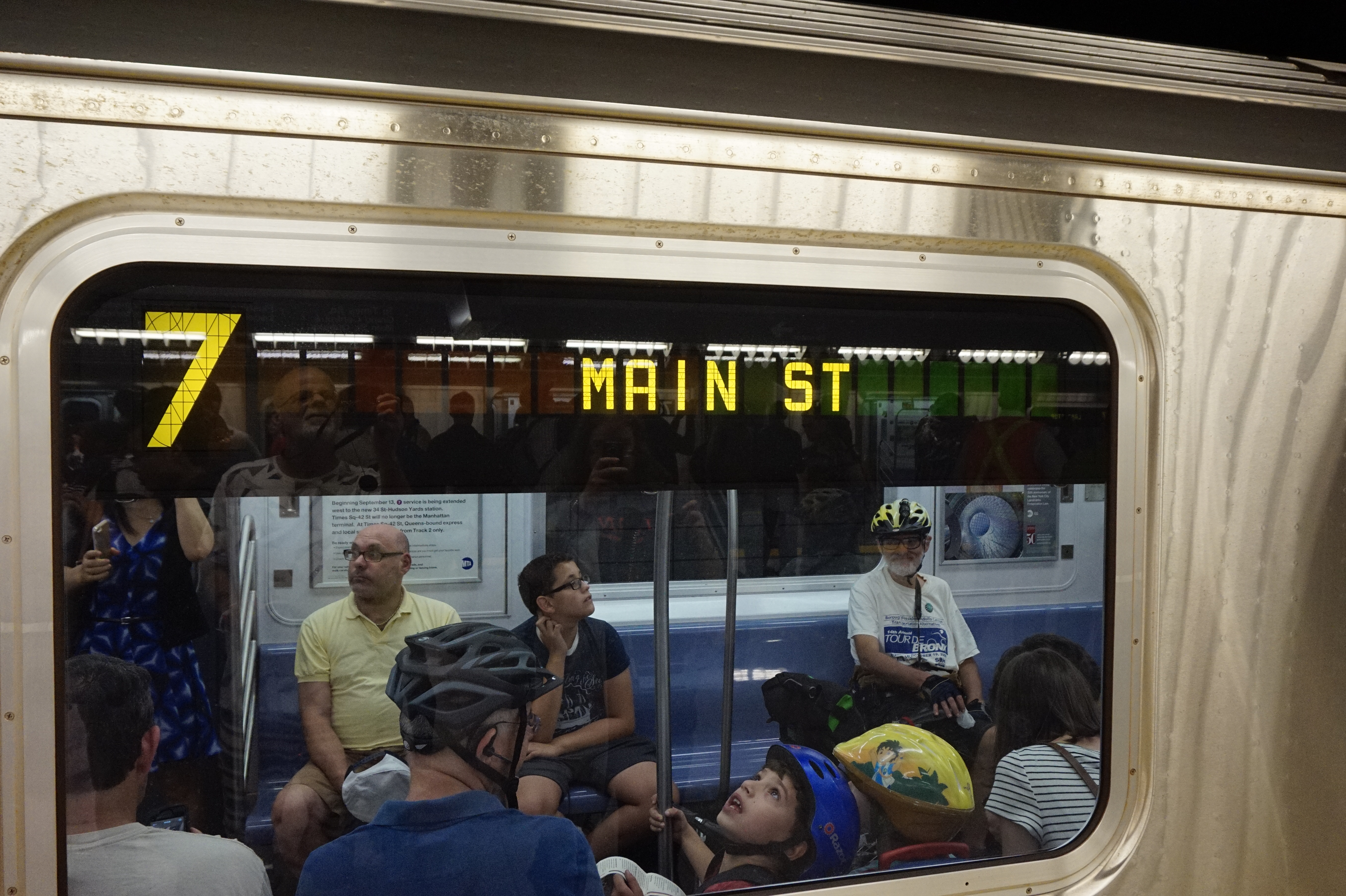
An unmodified electronic visual display on an R188 car

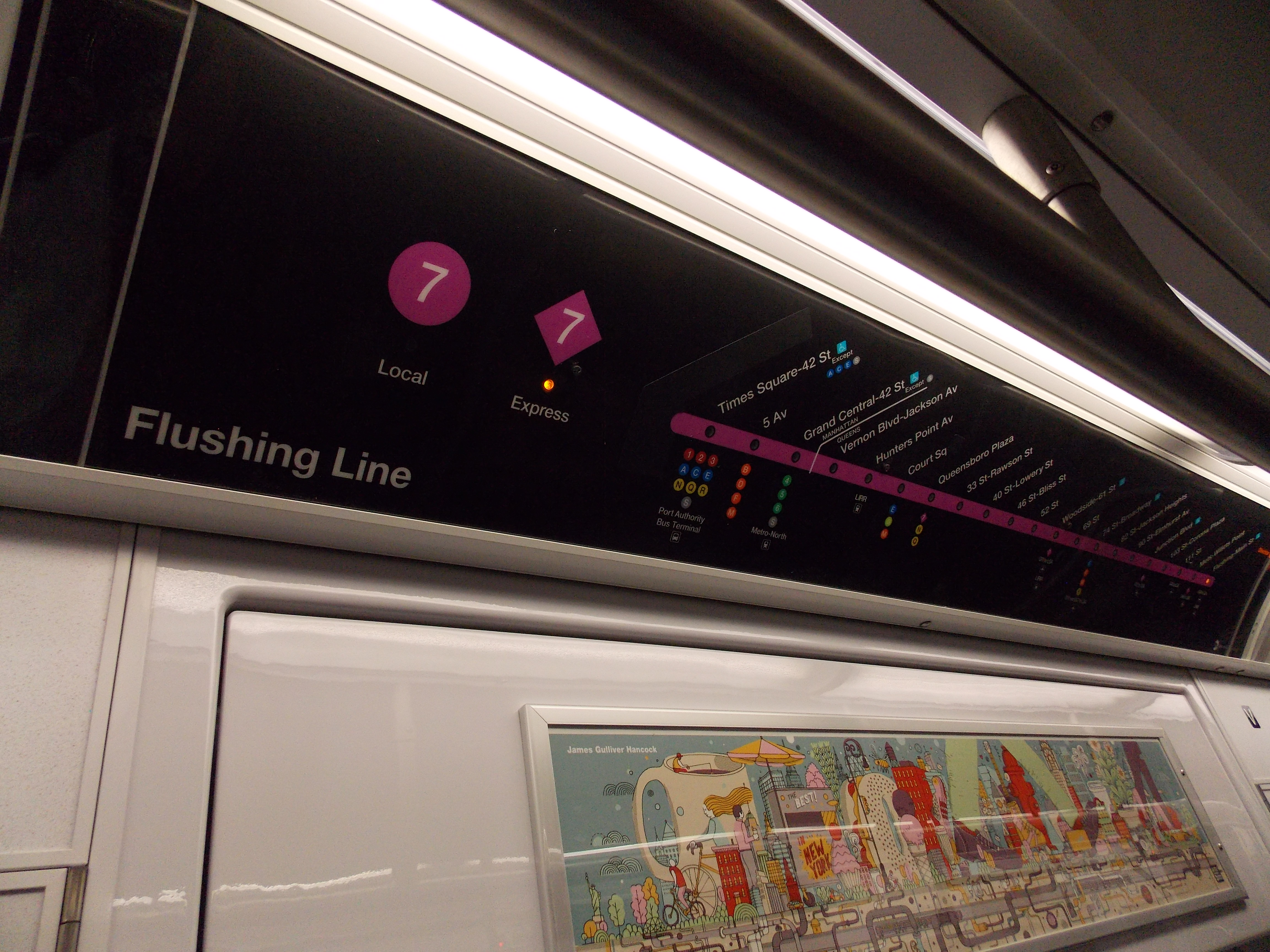
An electronic strip map on an R188 car

=== Experimental features ===
On June 10, 2016, cars 7501–7510 and 7928 had their route signs modified with green circle/red diamond LED signs and a LED numbered-route display, similar to those on the R62A sets that were previously used on the 7 before being moved to the 6. This modification was done to make it easier for passengers to differentiate between an express or a local train. In the following year, car 7501 had the LCD destination indicator parts of its destination signs replaced with LED panels to make it aesthetically similar to the aforementioned route display.

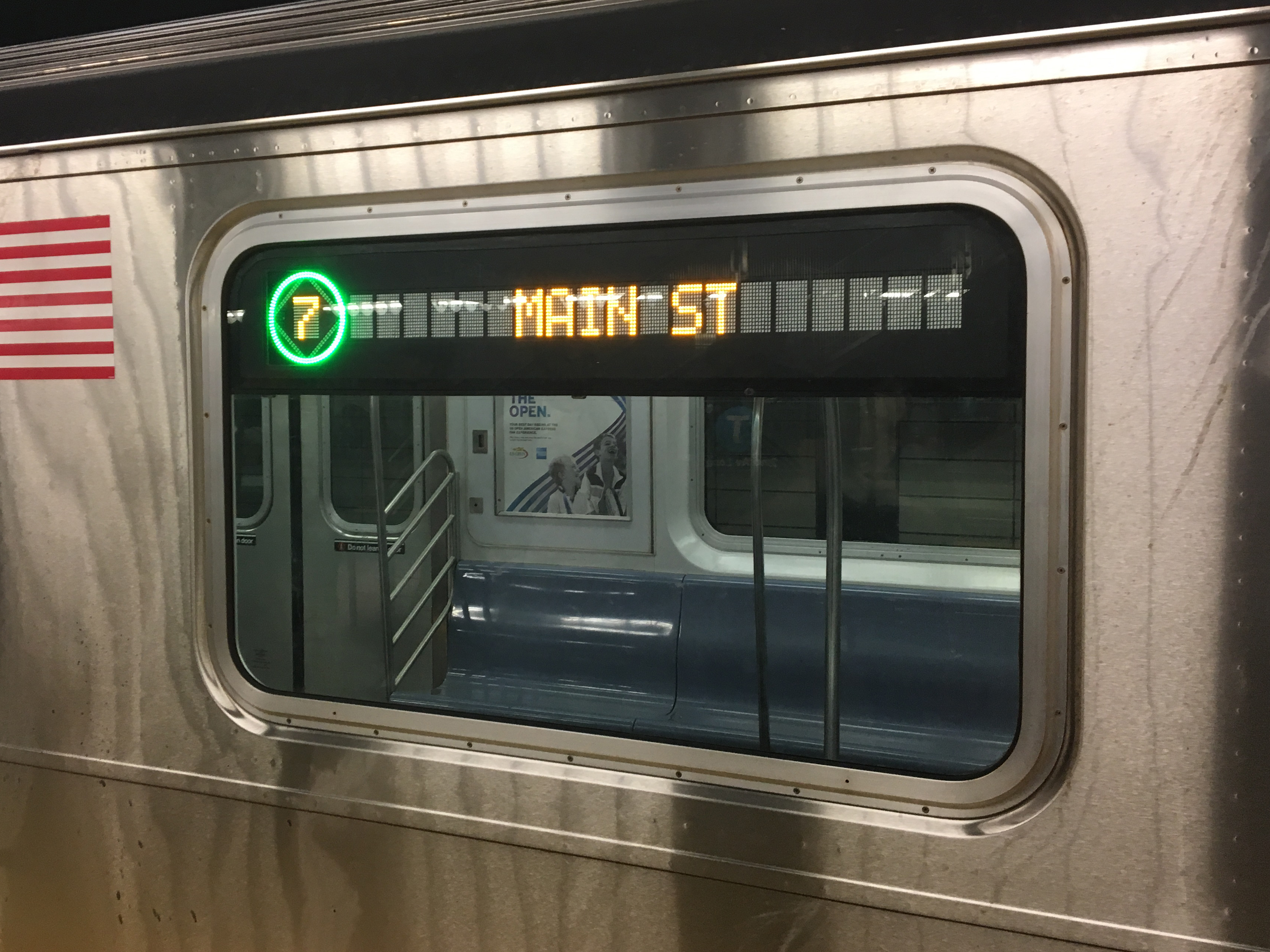
A modified electronic visual display on an R188 car (the green circle denotes a local train)

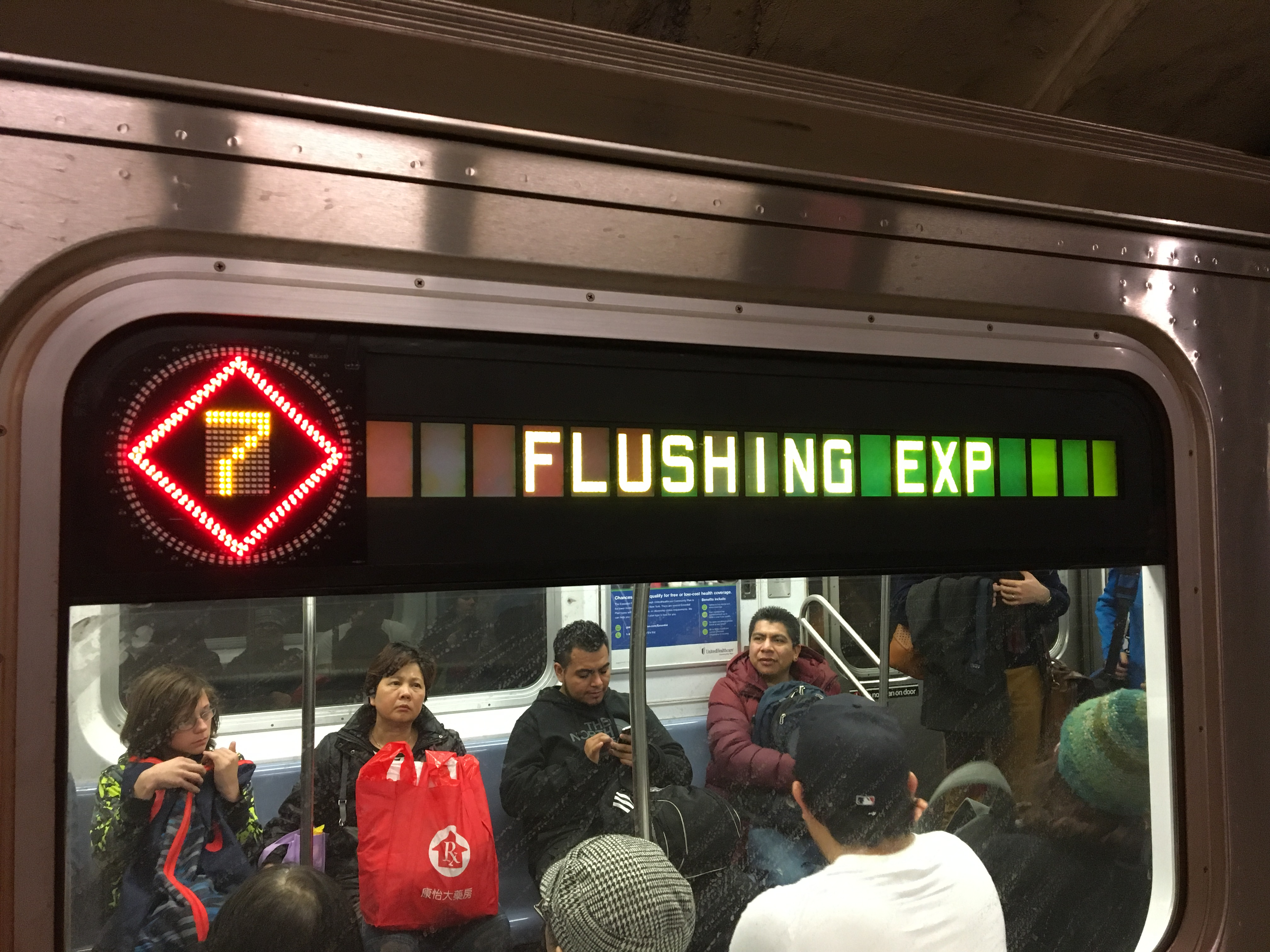
A modified electronic visual display on an R188 car (the red diamond denotes an express train)

== History ==
=== Timeline of contracts ===
All planned orders	# of converted cars		# of new C cars		# of new A & B cars	
All planned orders	Total		Total		Total	
All planned orders	Main order	Option order	Main order	Option order	Main order	Option order
Original proposal	140		14		352 (Note: This was the total of 131 converted R142A cars compatible with communication-based train control (CBTC) and an additional 189 R142A conversion kits. The option order of 473 cars was broken down as follows: 163 new R188 cars, conversion of 124 R142/R142A cars, and providing 186 conversion kits of R142/R142As.)	
Original proposal	10	130	1	13	22	330
2010–2014; Capital; Program	360		36		110	
2010–2014; Capital; Program	10	350	1	35	22	88
Final contract	380		38		88	
Final contract	10	370	1	37	22	66

At the time that the R188 order was placed, 40 eleven-car sets of R62As were assigned to the 7 service. The R188 order originally consisted of 186 new cars, as well as 131 converted R142A cars compatible with communication-based train control (CBTC) and an additional 189 R142A conversion kits for the MTA, totaling a possible 506 cars, or 46 eleven-car trains. Of these 506 cars, 230 are arranged in five-car sets while the remaining 276 are arranged in six-car sets. Six extra R188 trainsets were ordered in conjunction with CBTC installation and 7 Subway Extension. The trains are configured so that the five-car consist on each train is located on the Manhattan-bound end and the six-car consist is located on the Main Street-bound end, due to the position of conductor's boards on platforms along the 7 route.

According to the 2010–2014 Capital Plan, 146 new cars were to be purchased. Of these new cars, 110 cars would go to make up 10 new eleven-car trains, while the remaining 36 cars were to be "C" cars that would go to expanding 36 CBTC upgraded R142A five-car sets (360 existing cars) to six-car lengths. The original planned total of 46 eleven-car trains (506 cars) would still result from this order.

In the latest revision, however, only 88 new cars were to be purchased to form 8 new eleven-car trains, with 38 "C" cars, rather than 10 eleven-car trains. Likewise, the number of conversion cars was altered to 370. This change was made because only two sets of ten-car R62As were needed for fleet expansion of the mainline IRT, as opposed to the previously projected four sets, and thus the MTA and Kawasaki opted to convert two additional R142A train sets instead of manufacturing two new sets. The MTA also decided to have Kawasaki perform all of the conversions at the Yonkers plant instead of 207th Street Shop as part of that contract modification.

The R188 contract was awarded in spring 2010 to Kawasaki Heavy Industries, who won by default since only two manufacturers qualified, and Bombardier Transportation opted not to bid on the contract, citing the small order and large requirement for engineering resources. The contract was specified at $87,094,272 for the base order, which consisted of 33 cars (23 new cars and 10 conversions), and $384,315,168 for the option order, which consisted of 473 cars (123 new cars, and 350 conversions) for a total price of $471,409,440.

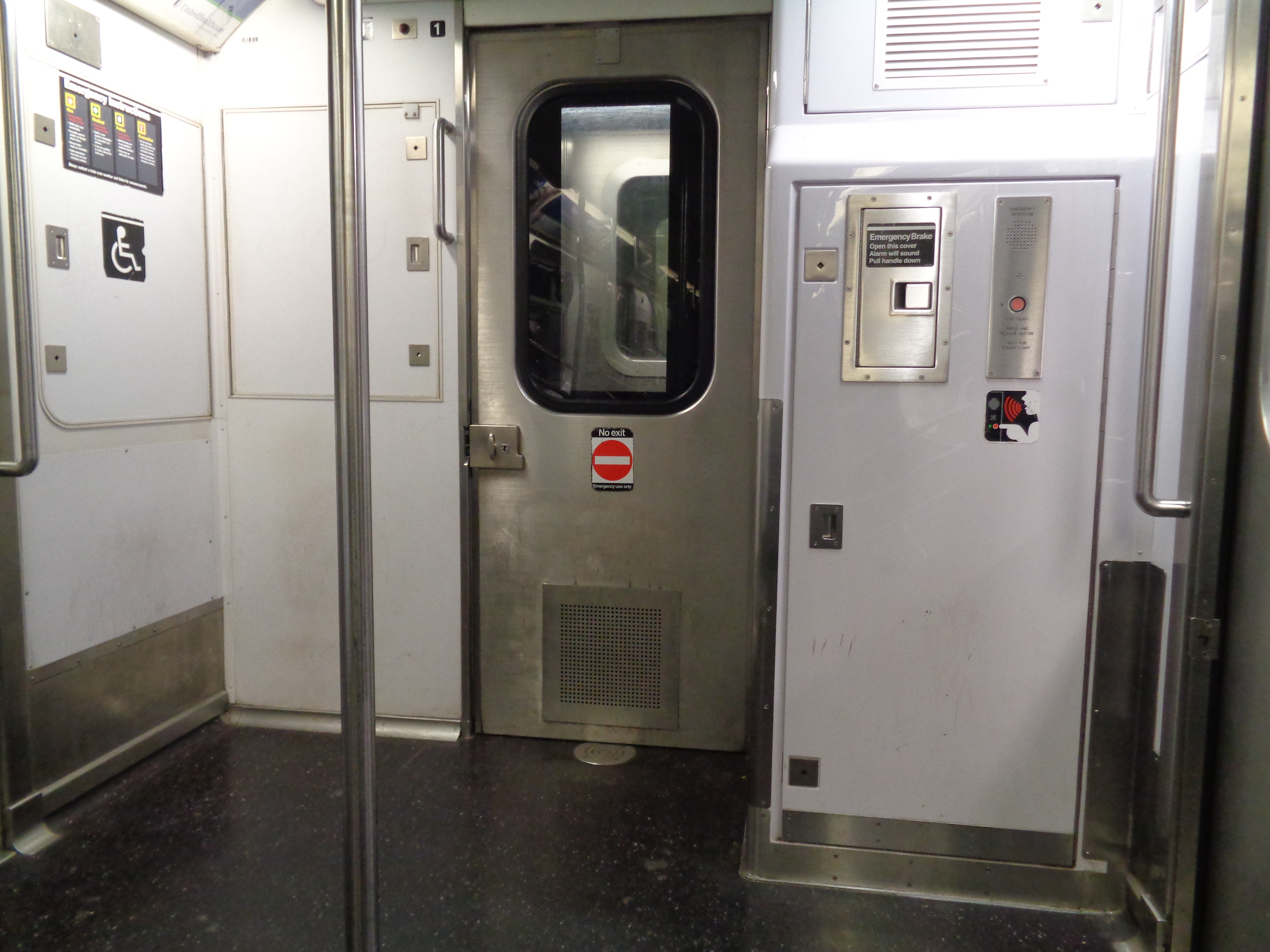
A data communication system (right) installed on an R188 car

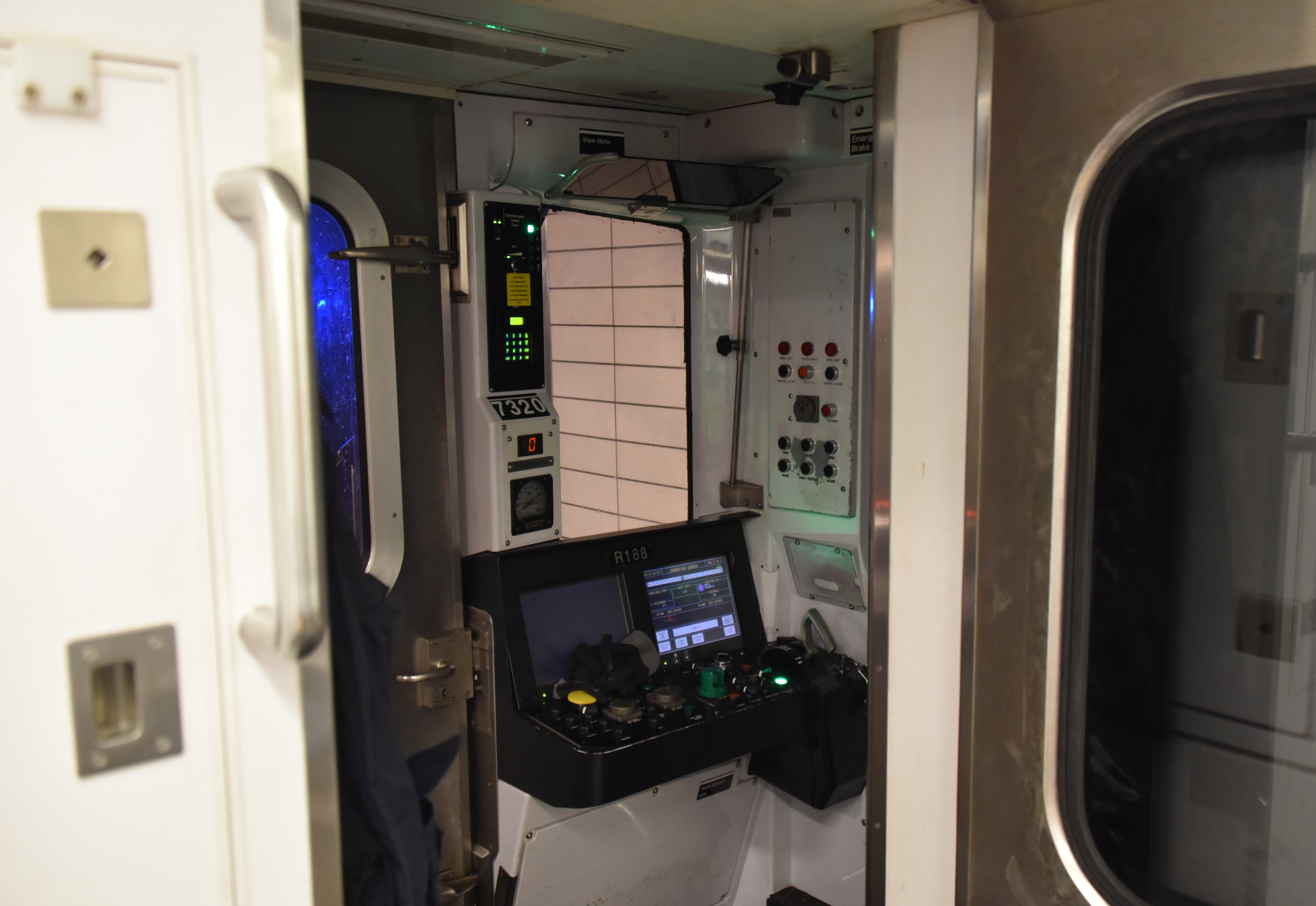
A driver's console on an R188 car

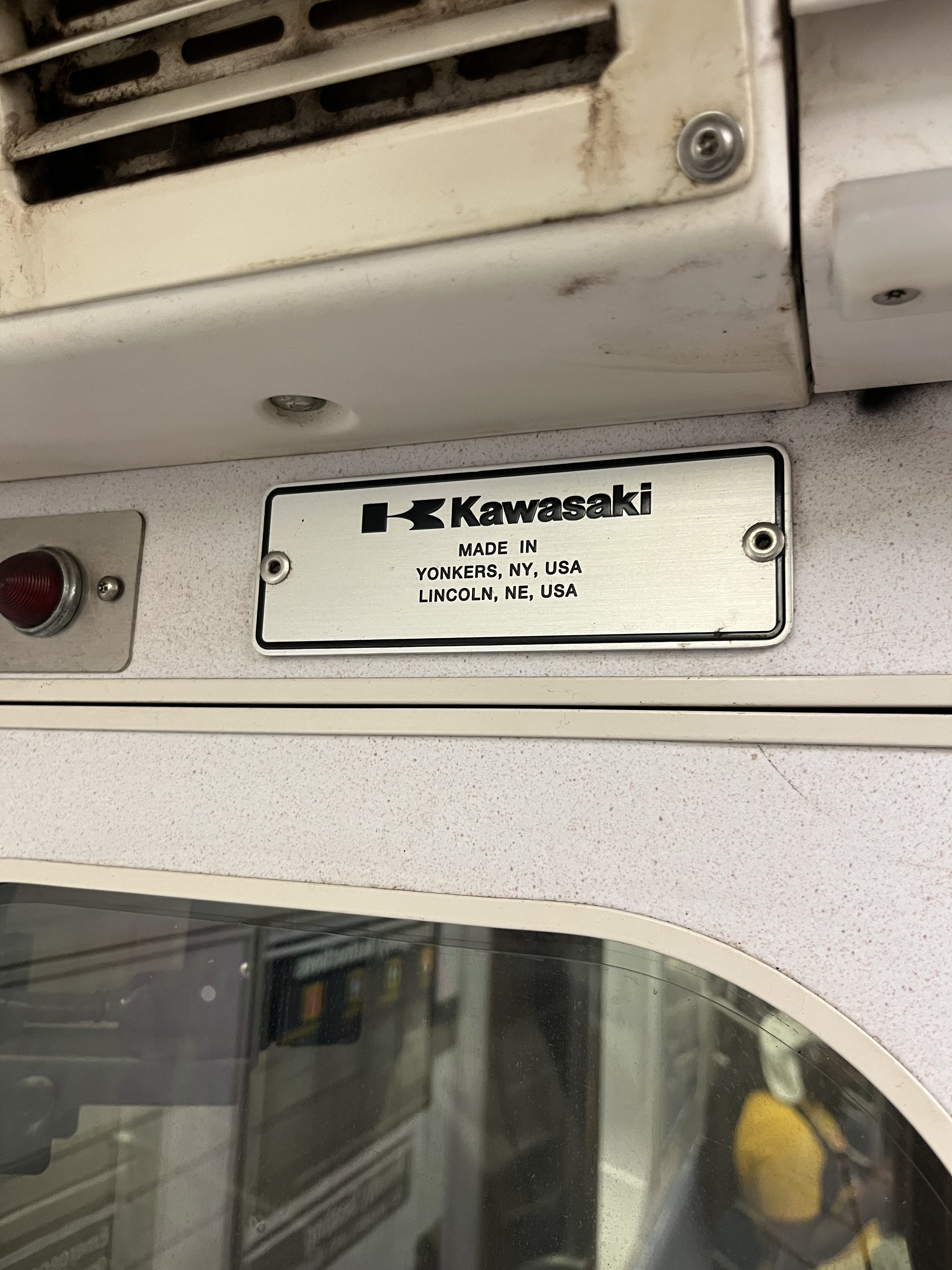
Builders plate of the R188 cars

=== Delivery ===
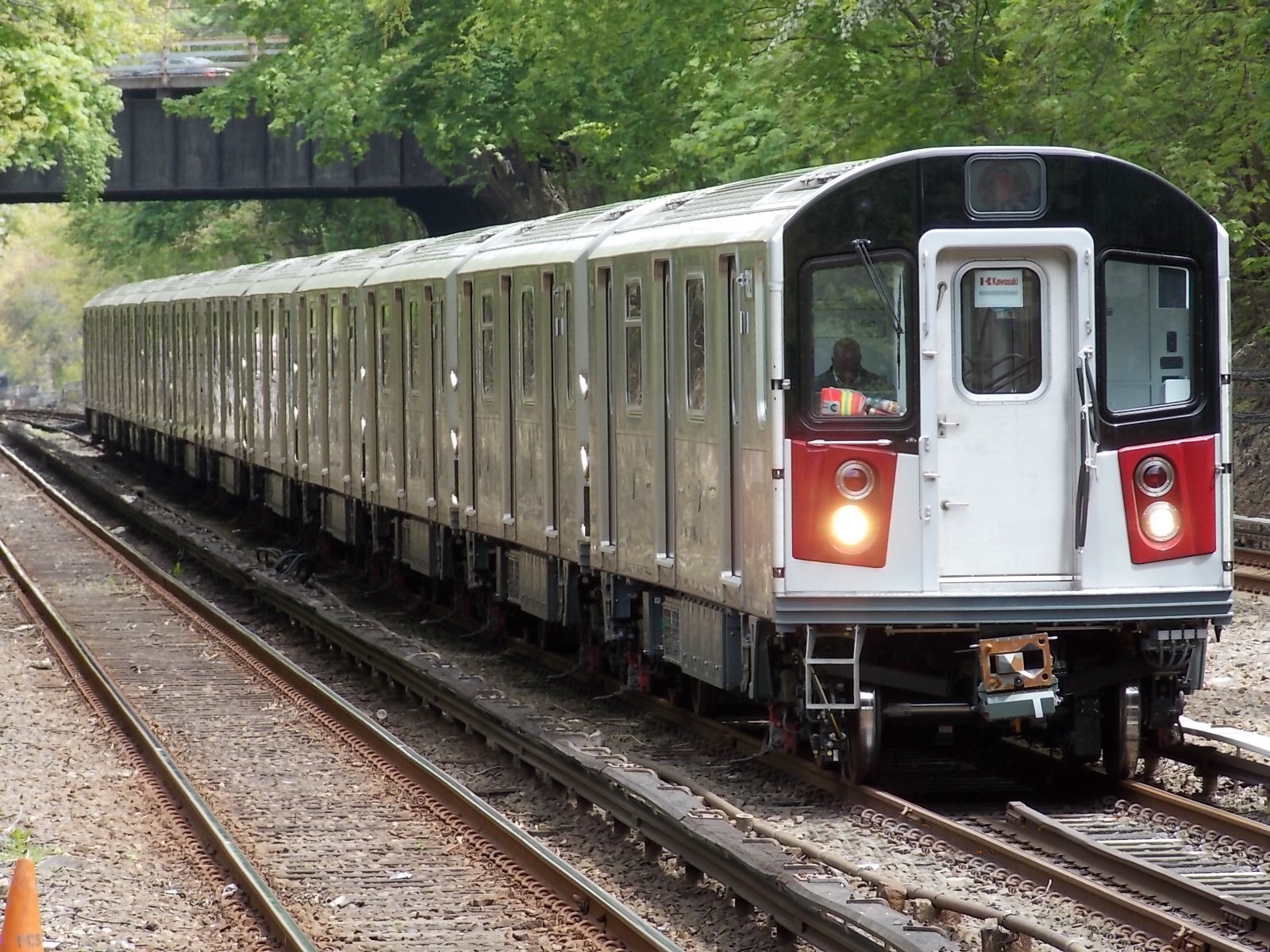
R188 cars 7811-7821 testing on the IRT Dyre Avenue Line at Gun Hill Road

According to a February 2012 update, the MTA had expected to have 8 conversion sets in service by the time that the 7 Subway Extension is opened for revenue service. In addition, the breakdown of the trainsets has been disclosed. Operationally, the R188s are coupled as such:

A-B-B-B-A+A-B-B-B-C-A

where dashes signify link bars, and the addition sign denotes couplers. Thirty-eight R142A B cars, therefore, were converted into R188 "C" cars, in addition to the 38 deliveries of new "C" cars (not including the "C" cars in the eight new 11-car sets).

The 10 converted R142A cars from the base order (7211–7220) were completed in December 2011 at Kawasaki's Yonkers facility and were delivered for testing on the Flushing Line in 2012. The 23 new R188 cars from the base order (two eleven-car sets, 7811–7832, and one conversion set "C" car, 7899) were completed in mid-2012, delivered in November 2013, and entered service in December 2013. The 66 new option cars (7833–7898) were also completed in mid-2012 and have been delivered, while the remaining 37 new cars and the 370 conversions were set to be converted and delivered from February 2014 until the 4th quarter of 2015.

On November 9, 2013, the first R188 train, consisting of cars 7811–7821, was placed in service on the 7 train as part of its 30-day revenue acceptance test. After successful completion, it entered revenue service by December 15, 2013. By July 2014, the delivery schedule had slipped by about 6–7 months. However, delivery of the cars sped up; all remaining R188 cars were expected to be delivered by the end of July 2016, but the last R188 cars were delivered on June 14, 2016. By July 22, 2016, all R188s were in service.

== Media and promotions ==
In January 2020, as part of an agreement between the MTA and Comedy Central to promote actress Awkwafina's TV show Nora From Queens, the default pre-recorded announcements on the R188s were replaced with those from Awkwafina for one week. The announcements from Awkwafina featured jokes in addition to the standard station announcements. The agreement was the first time that the MTA has replaced train announcements as a form of advertising. In September 2022, New York Mets television broadcast announcers Ron Darling, Keith Hernandez, and Gary Cohen recorded announcements for the R188s.

The R188s have also been the subject of promotional advertising wraps. For example, the exteriors of several trains have been covered in advertisements for the U.S. Open's sponsors during the U.S. Open. In 2024, the exterior of one set of R188s received temporary stickers depicting the McDonald's character Grimace.
