= List of heads of public transport authorities in London =

Overview of the heads of bus, rail and Underground planning in the English capital

Since the creation of the London Passenger Transport Board in 1933, non-mainline railway and road passenger transport in London and the surrounding area has been under central or local government control in a variety of forms. The following persons headed the public transport authorities responsible for managing these services.

== London Passenger Transport Board ==
Chairmen of London Passenger Transport Board:

- Albert Stanley, 1st Baron Ashfield, 1933–1947
- Charles Latham, 1st Baron Latham, 1947

== London Transport Executive ==
Chairmen of London Transport Executive:

- Charles Latham, 1st Baron Latham, 1948–1953
- Sir John Elliot, 1953–1959
- Sir Alexander Valentine, 1959–1963

== London Transport Board ==
Chairmen of London Transport Board:

- Sir Alexander Valentine, 1963–1965
- Sir Maurice Holmes, 1965–1969

== London Transport Executive ==
Chairmen of London Transport Executive:

- Sir Richard Way, 1970–1975
- Sir Kenneth Robinson, 1975–1978
- Ralph Bennett, 1978–1980
- Sir Peter Masefield, 1980–1982
- Sir Keith Bright, 1982–1984

== London Regional Transport ==
Chairmen of London Regional Transport:

- Sir Keith Bright, 1984–1988
- Sir Neil Shields, 1988–1989
- Sir Wilfrid Newton, 1989–1994
- Peter Ford, 1994–1998
- Sir Malcolm Bates, 1999–2001
- Bob Kiley, 2001
- Sir Malcolm Bates, 2001–2003

== Transport for London ==
Commissioners of Transport for London:

- Bob Kiley, 2000–2006
- Sir Peter Hendy, 2006–2015
- Mike Brown, 2015–2020
- Andy Byford, 2020–2022
- Andy Lord, 2023–present

== See also ==
- History of public transport authorities in London
- Transport in London
