= London Transport =

London Transport may refer to:

- London Transport (brand)

Transport authorities that operated services under the brand:

- London Passenger Transport Board (1933–1948)
- London Transport Executive (1948–1963)
- London Transport Board (1963–1970)
- London Transport Executive (GLC) (1970–1984)
- London Regional Transport (1984–2000)
- Transport for London (TfL) (2000 onward)

== See also ==
- History of public transport authorities in London
- Transport in London
- London Transit (London, Ontario)
