= 2017–2021 New York City transit crisis =

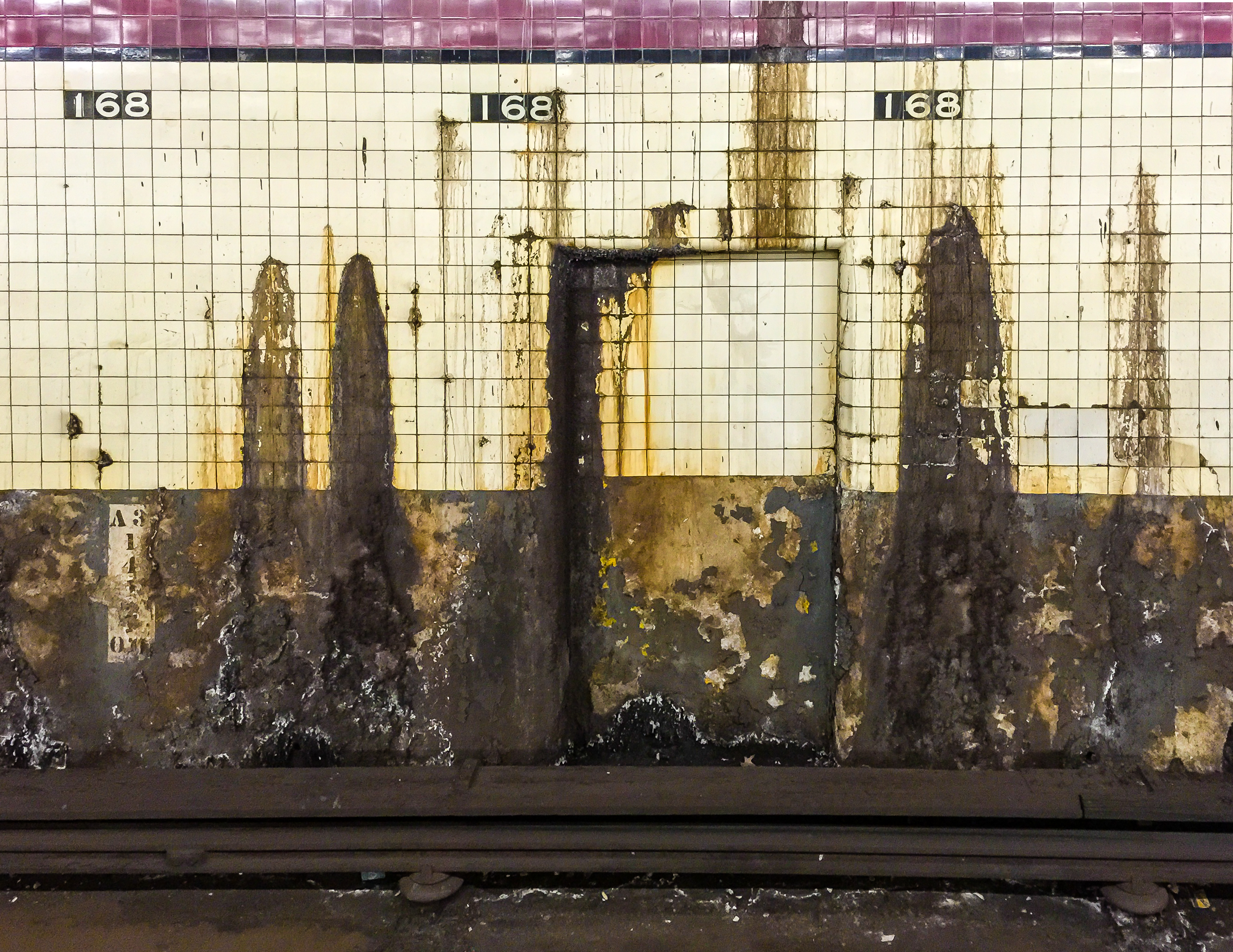
Deteriorating subway station wall at 168th Street

In 2017, New York Governor Andrew Cuomo declared a state of emergency for the Metropolitan Transportation Authority (MTA) due to ongoing reliability and crowding problems with mass transit in New York City. This order applied particularly to the New York City Subway, which was the most severely affected by dilapidated infrastructure, causing overcrowding and delays. With many parts of the system approaching or exceeding 100 years of age, general deterioration could be seen in many subway stations. By 2017, only 65% of weekday trains reached their destinations on time, the lowest rate since a transit crisis in the 1970s. To a lesser extent, New York City buses operated by the MTA were also affected. Both the subway and the buses are run by the New York City Transit Authority (NYCTA), a subsidiary of the MTA. A separate crisis at Penn Station affected the routes of the three railroad agencies that provided service into the station. Media outlets deemed these crises "the summer of hell".

There have been myriad causes attributed to inciting the transit crisis. The subway was affected by a lack of funds, signal slowdowns, and degrading infrastructure. The buses were also affected by a lack of funds, but individual routes had additional problems including low frequencies, slow speeds, and winding routes. Money from the MTA in general was withheld due to actions from politicians at both the city and state levels, from both the Democratic Party and Republican Party. These issues caused delays for passengers for both systems, ranging from moderate to severe, and also resulted in thousands of hours of lost time for passengers. Additionally, ridership on the subway began declining for the first time in several years, and ridership on buses continued a gradual decline that had started before the crisis.

Several solutions were proposed. In July 2017, MTA chairman Joe Lhota created a multifaceted "Subway Action Plan" that consisted of short- and long-term solutions. A corresponding "Bus Action Plan" was released in April 2018. Later that year, the Regional Plan Association released a report that advocated for large investments to the subway system. The MTA hired Andy Byford as the new NYCTA chief in 2018; Byford presented a report to tackle the issues plaguing the transit system before his resignation two years later. Service improved through 2019, but the onset of the COVID-19 pandemic in New York City in early 2020 further depleted the MTA's finances. Cuomo also proposed implementing congestion pricing in New York City to fund the MTA, which was approved in 2021 and took effect in 2025.

== Declaration of crisis ==
On June 27, 2017, thirty-nine people were injured when an A train derailed at 125th Street because the train's emergency brakes were activated as it hit an improperly secured piece of replacement rail. The next day, Governor Andrew Cuomo signed an executive order declaring a state of emergency for the subway system. This state of emergency had also arisen after several track fires and overcrowding incidents. As part of the order, he ordered MTA Chairman Joe Lhota to come up with a reorganization plan within 30 days. A day later, the MTA officially announced the Genius Transit Challenge, where contestants could submit ideas to improve signals, communications infrastructure, or rolling stock. At Pennsylvania Station in Midtown Manhattan, a separate transit crisis developed due to deferred maintenance. In early 2017, this culminated in numerous power outages, derailments, and delays due to track maintenance.

During July 2017, Cuomo and Mayor Bill de Blasio disagreed over whether the city or state controlled the subway system. Cuomo claimed that the city was responsible, while de Blasio argued that he had contributed enough to the system. On July 21, the second set of wheels on a southbound Q train jumped the track near Brighton Beach, constituting the system's second derailment within a month. Nine people suffered injuries due to improper maintenance of the car in question.

== Causes ==
=== Lack of funds ===
On November 18, 2017, The New York Times published its investigation into the crisis, with over 1,000 readers having submitted stories about the effects of the past year's subway delays. It found that politicians from both the Democratic and Republican parties, at the mayoral and gubernatorial levels, had gradually removed $1.5 billion of MTA funding. The Times stressed that no single event directly caused the crisis; rather, it was an accumulation of small cutbacks and maintenance deferments. The New York Times described MTA funds as a "piggy bank" for the state, with the issuance of MTA bonds benefiting the state at the MTA's expense. By 2017, a sixth of the MTA's budget was allocated to paying off debt, a threefold proportional increase from 1997. The city's $250 million annual contribution to the MTA budget in 2017 was a quarter of the contribution in 1990.

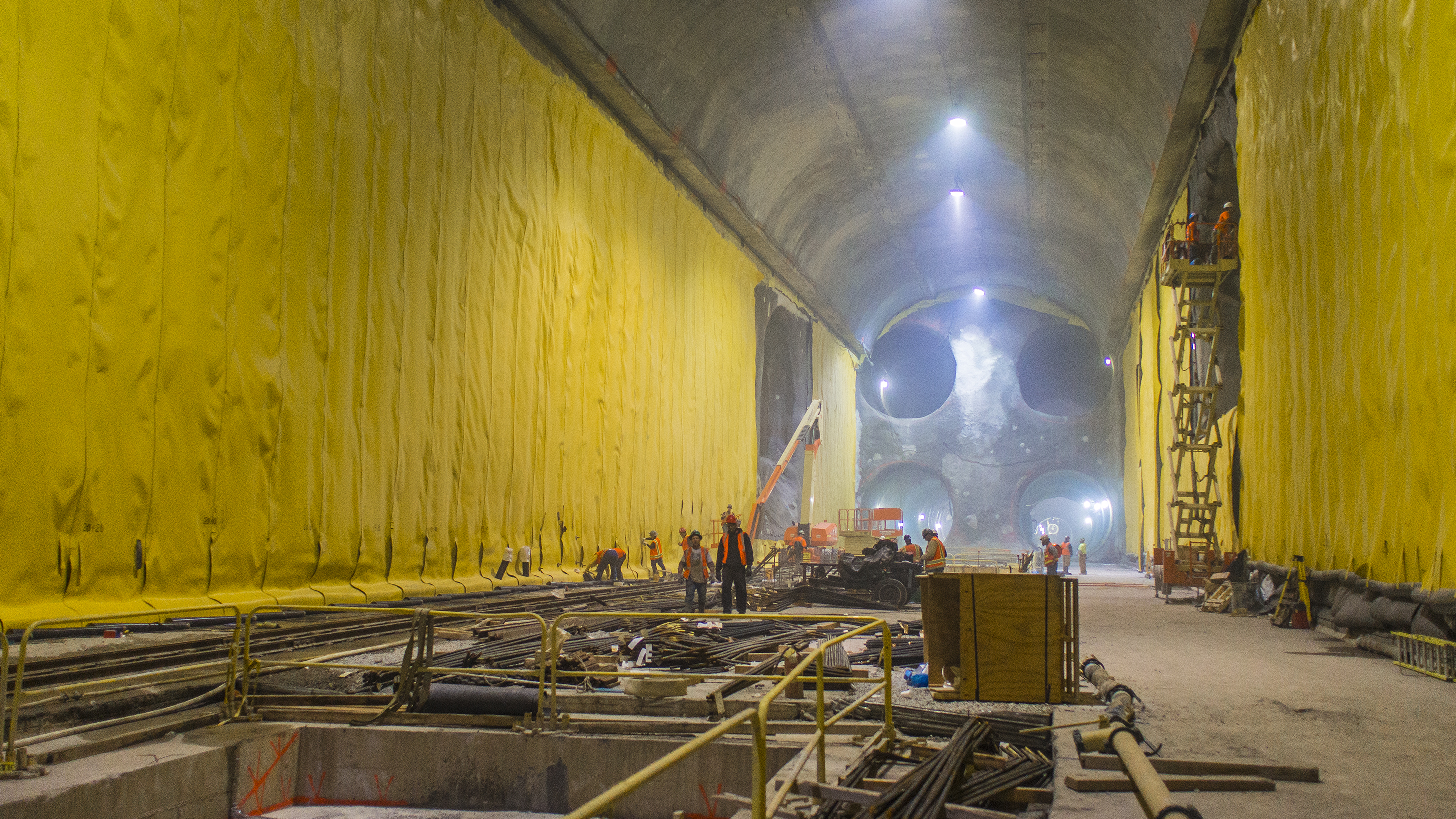
The MTA's East Side Access became the most expensive underground railway project in the world due to politicians' monetary mismanagement of the MTA, as well as costly, inefficient union rules.

The lack of funding was not only due to the gradual reduction of direct support. Other actions by city and state politicians, according to the Times, included overspending; overpaying unions and interest groups; advertising superficial improvement projects while ignoring more important infrastructure issues; and agreeing to high-interest loans in order to make up the deficit from the governmental reductions in funding. In December of the same year, the Times reported that the $12 billion East Side Access project, which would extend the MTA's Long Island Rail Road to Grand Central Terminal upon its completion, was the most expensive project of its kind in the world. The predicted cost of $3.5 billion per mile ($2.2 billion per kilometer) was attributed to various unnecessary expenditures, including hiring additional workers for little reason, as well as uncompetitive bidding processes.

=== Signal and work-zone slowdowns ===
The transit crisis was influenced partly by modifications to New York City Subway signals and work-zone policies that required trains to reduce their speeds. After a collision between two trains on the Williamsburg Bridge in 1995, in which a train operator was killed after speeding his train into the back of another, the MTA modified both signals and trains to lower their average speeds. Since some of the signals were malfunctioning, operators slowed trains further in case a defective signal forced trains to wait for longer than was indicated, resulting in lower frequencies and overcrowded trains. By 2012, over 1,200 signals had been modified, and by 2018, that number had grown to 1,800. Exacerbating the signal problems, some of the oldest block signals in the system were as much as 80 years old as of 2017, and they also broke down frequently.

Subway trains were also forced to slow down due to work-zone rules. These rules were created by a task force, and implemented in 2007 after a series of worker deaths. Prior to 2007, if one track was out of service, trains on adjacent tracks could operate at normal speeds; the rule changes forced trains on adjacent tracks to travel at 10 miles per hour or less. As a result, the proportion of delays caused by track work increased by 10% between 2013 and 2014, while the amount of track work remained constant.

=== Bus problems ===
A corresponding bus crisis existed simultaneously, however, it did not receive nearly as much media attention. In November 2017, New York City Comptroller Scott Stringer identified several causes for the bus system's unreliability. In the report, he stated that almost half of all bus routes ran at low frequencies during rush hours. He also reported that many bus routes were vulnerable to "bus bunching", where several buses travel the same route in quick succession. The average speeds of New York City buses were found to be 7 to 8 miles per hour (11 to 13 km/h), the slowest of any major bus system nationwide. Additionally, Stringer wrote that long, winding bus routes caused bus speeds to slow down.

== Effects ==
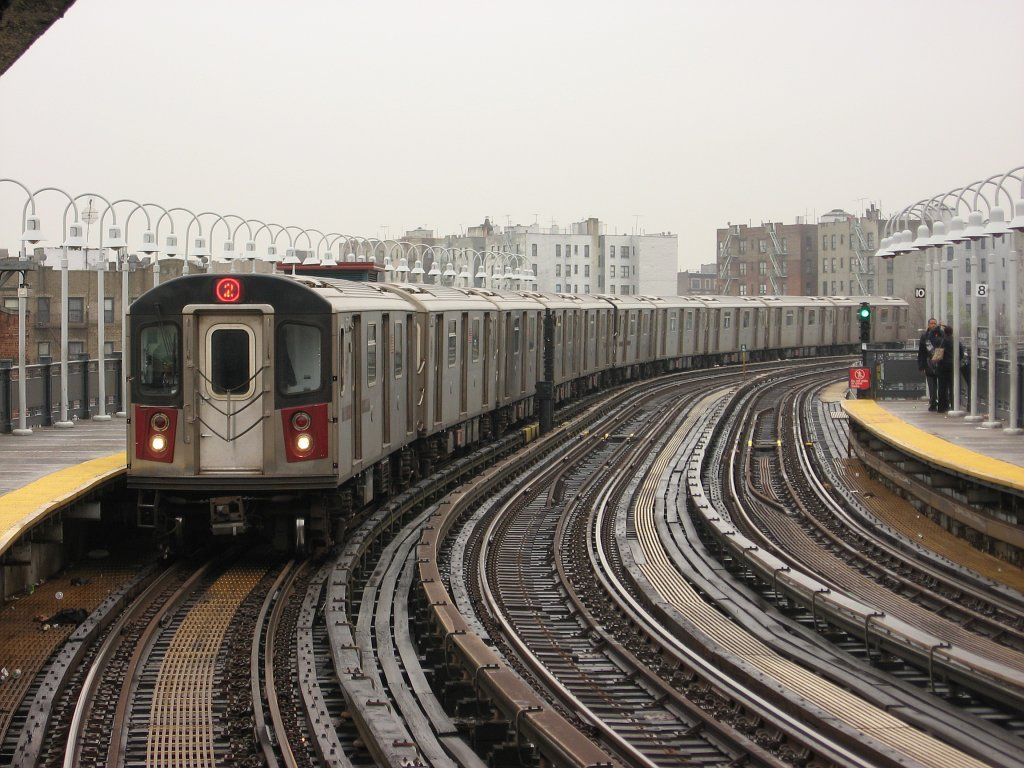
The 2 train, the "least reliable" route in the subway system as of 2017

Even before the crisis, every non-shuttle subway route's on-time performance had declined: in 2007, all of these routes had over 70% on-time performance, arriving at the last station within five minutes of the timetable, but in 2017, only three routes could claim that distinction. The least reliable route, the 2 train, reached its terminus on-schedule only 32% of the time, and the New York City Subway's 65% average on-time performance was the lowest among all major cities' transit systems. David L. Gunn, who helped end the 1980s transit crisis when he led the NYCTA in the mid-1980s, described the 2017 crisis as "heartbreaking".

In August 2017, The New York Times released an article about how the routes that serve the Lexington Avenue Line (the 4, 5, 6, and <6> trains) failed to meet its schedule count during weekday rush hours when demand is at its highest. Officials have often cited overcrowding as the reason for trains being cancelled. Chairman Lhota has stated that maintaining space between trains was more of a priority for him than meeting the schedules was. The overcrowding was really an effect, rather than a cause, of delays. Although average weekday ridership stayed largely constant from 2012 to 2018, the number of delays attributed to overcrowding increased, even as the number of other types of delays did not change by much.

In October 2017, Comptroller Stringer released an analysis of the effect of subway delays on the economy and on commuters, finding that "worst-case" subway delays of more than 20 minutes could cost up to $389 million annually in lost productivity. By comparison, "mid-case" delays of between 10 and 20 minutes could cost $243.1 million per year, and "best-case" delays of between 5 and 10 minutes could cost $170.2 million per year. As a result of the maintenance crisis, weekday subway ridership began declining for the first time in several years in 2017. With 5.712 million average weekday riders in September 2017, this translated to about 105,000 fewer riders per weekday compared to 2016. Bus ridership also maintained a continuing decrease, as one hundred million fewer riders rode MTA buses in 2017 than in 2008. Rider complaints on social media intensified during the crisis: by mid-2018, there were 2,500 daily complaints to the MTA's and subway's Twitter accounts.

In January 2018, average weekday on-time performance had dropped from 65% to 58.1%, and there were more than 76,000 delayed trains, which reached their terminus at least five minutes later than what was listed on the timetable. Over 10,000 trains, or 14%, had been delayed for "unknown causes"; exacerbating the situation, the MTA incorrectly classified causes of the unknown delays. It was so common for subway trains to be delayed that many commuters traveled earlier than usual to factor in any potential subway delays.

== Short-term solutions ==
After a particularly bad bout of delays in May 2017, the MTA devised a "six-point plan" to reduce subway delays. It planned to hasten the delivery of new R211 cars; perform testing on boarding and alighting patterns at stations; post emergency medical technicians at key stations to treat sick passengers; double the frequency of the monthly track-defect detection tests; reduce bottlenecks at junctions; and reorganize the leadership hierarchy. The plan would cost $20 million and be implemented at 21 stations as a trial. On the Eighth Avenue Line especially, there are an average of 25 subway-car breakdowns per month, with the average such delay lasting 19 minutes. The EMTs would be posted in five Eighth Avenue Line stations, and there would also be an increased police presence. The improved boarding and alighting patterns might include color-coded platforms and subway cars, as well as additional signage. Finally, there would be a new chairman position to be split off of the existing CEO position. Transit commentators viewed the plan positively, regarding the plan as a small step toward increasing the subway's reliability.

Also in May, Amtrak announced that it would be performing track maintenance around Penn Station over a period of one and a half months in summer 2017. Five tracks were closed for repairs as part of the reconstruction work, severely reducing track capacity in a situation media outlets deemed "the summer of hell". Many affected NJ Transit passengers were diverted to take the PATH instead. Regular service resumed on September 5, 2017.

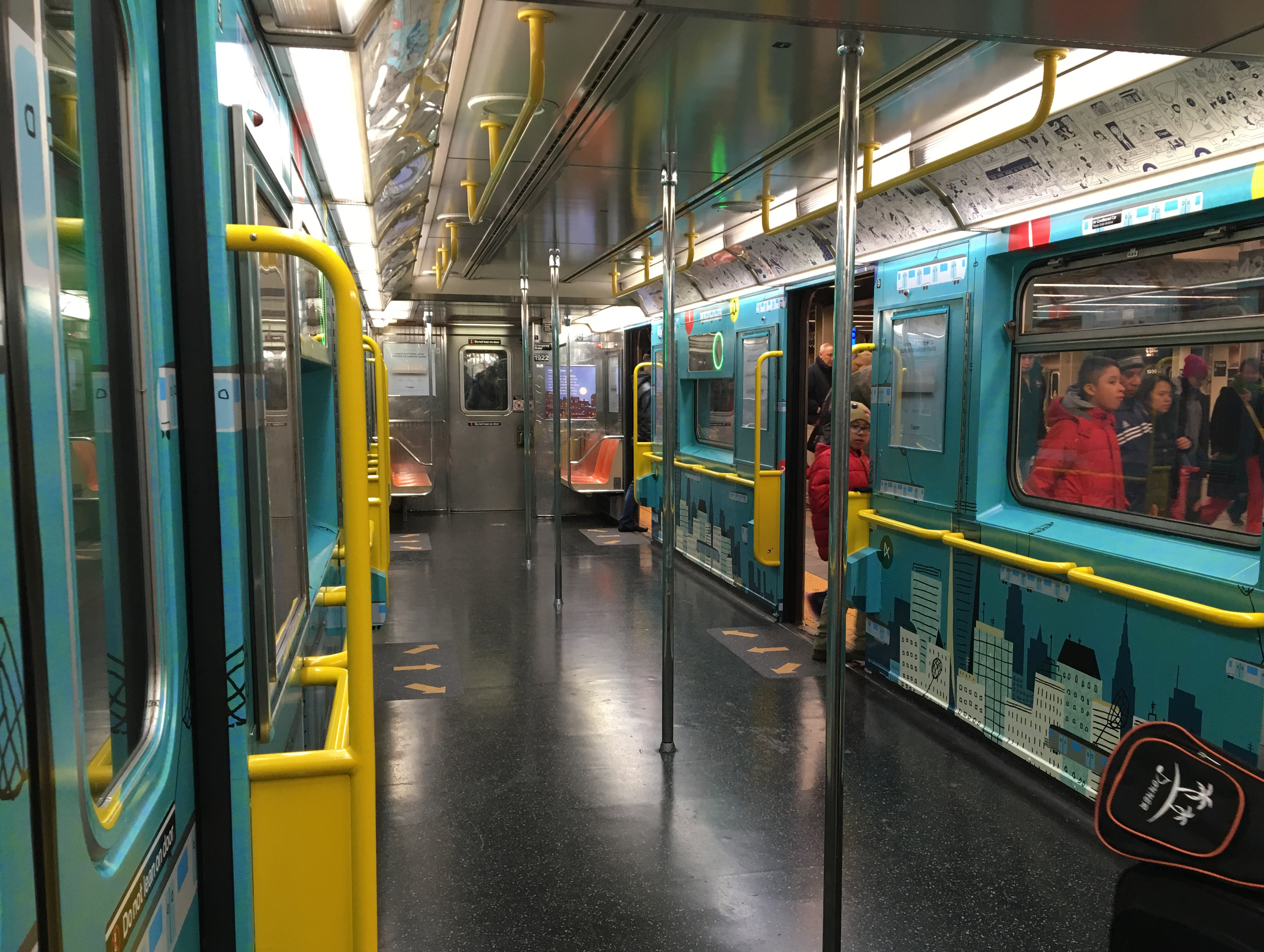
One aspect of the New York City Subway Action Plan involved removing seats from the 42nd Street Shuttle (pictured)

On July 25, Chairman Lhota announced a two-phase, $9 billion New York City Subway Action Plan to stabilize the subway system and to stall its continuing decline. It expanded on the six-point plan elaborated on in May. The $836 million first phase, to be effective immediately, focused on "stabilization" and consisted of five categories: Signal and Track Maintenance, Car Reliability, System Safety and Cleanliness, Customer Communication, and Critical Management Group. The $8 billion second phase would implement the winning proposals from the Genius Transit Challenge and fix more widespread problems. On July 27, Cuomo announced that his administration was working on a way for private sponsors to "adopt a station" for up to $600,000. City officials announced on August 6 that de Blasio would push for a tax on wealthy New York City residents to help pay for necessary improvements in the subway. The proposal would raise between $700 million to $800 million but was criticized by Cuomo and MTA Chairman Joe Lhota for not providing money soon enough.

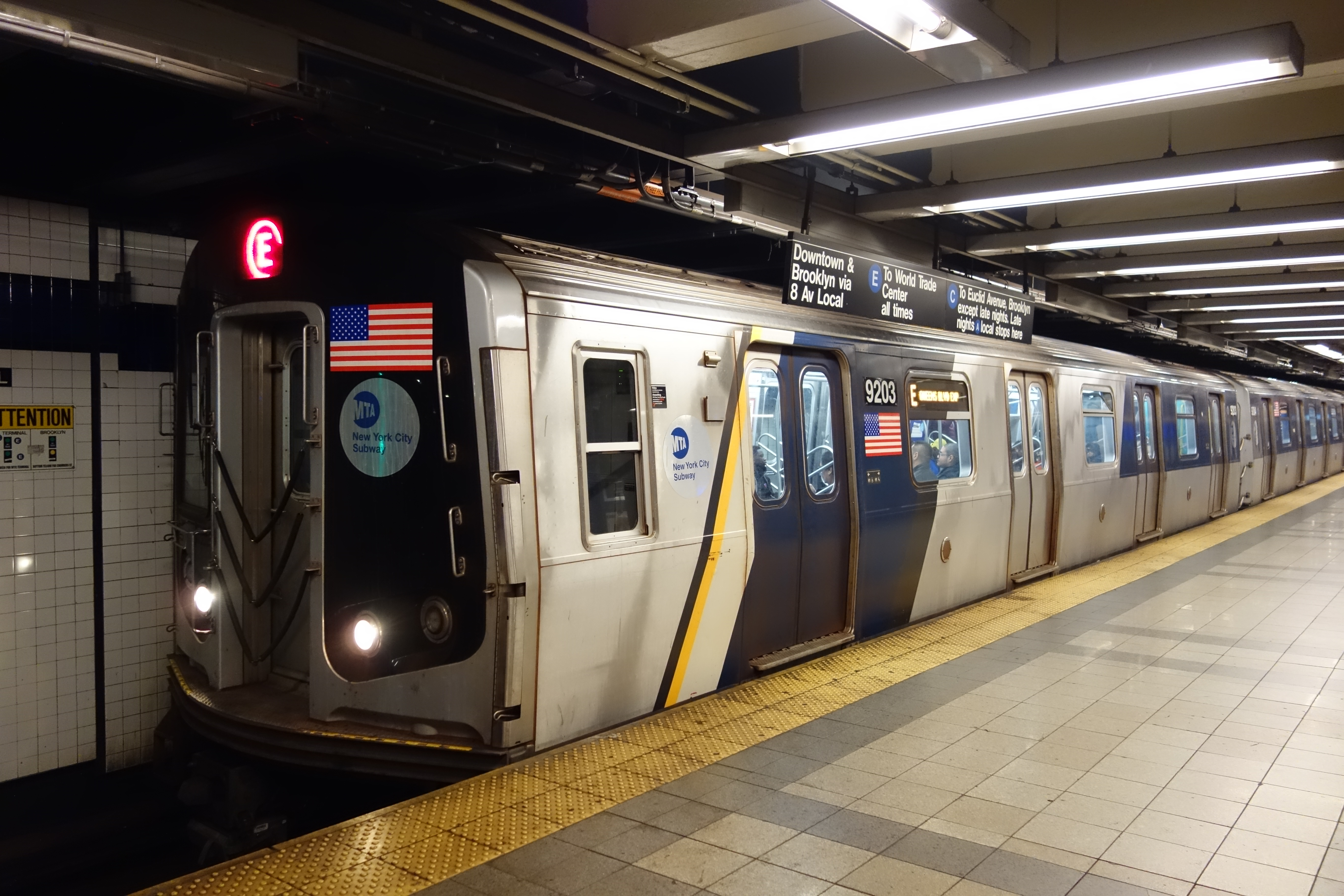
Refurbished R160 subway cars on the E route

In October 2017, as part of the action plan, a hundred R160 subway cars on the E train were retrofitted to provide extra capacity of 8 to 10 passengers per car, and some older R46 cars were also similarly refurbished. Additionally, officials started piloting a new fare system compatible with the LIRR and Metro-North's eTix electronic tickets, and several unspecified L train cars were being retrofitted with seats that folded up during rush hours. Officials also changed all announcements containing "ladies and gentlemen" and replaced them with gender-neutral terms to improve passenger service.

== Long-term solutions and proposals ==
In August 2017, Cuomo drafted a proposal for congestion pricing in New York City, with the primary intent of raising funds for city transit and reduce street gridlock, while balancing suburban commuter considerations. In October, the New York State Government created a task force, Fix NYC, to find solutions for fixing mass transit and lowering congestion. A preliminary proposal was released in January 2018. Mayor de Blasio, who initially opposed the congestion pricing plan, suggested a counter-proposal to raise taxes for the city's wealthiest residents. The Regional Plan Association also released its fourth Regional Plan on November 30, 2017, marking the first such plan since 1996. The plan, which had been prepared over the previous five years, suggested three changes for the subway system: constructing eight subway lines, modernizing the system, and accelerating the automation of the New York City Subway. The critic Justin Davidson wrote that many of the RPA's previous proposals had been implemented, unlike other regional planning associations, whose plans are typically ignored.

Improvements were also proposed for the bus system. These improvements included adding more bus lanes in New York City, which allow buses to use an exclusive bus lane without being blocked by other traffic. Traffic signal preemption, which changes traffic lights based on whether a bus is approaching, was also suggested for 1,000 traffic signals by 2020. In October 2017, de Blasio's administration announced that the city would add 21 Select Bus Service bus rapid transit routes through 2027. In April 2018, the MTA published a Bus Action Plan detailing 28 suggestions to improve the bus system, and the MTA also planned to test out a double-decker bus on the redesigned Staten Island bus routes.

=== New president ===
The MTA hired Andy Byford as the president of the New York City Transit Authority in November 2017. Previously CEO at the Toronto Transit Commission, Byford assumed his new position in January 2018. MTA leadership expected that Byford would be able to devise solutions to fix the NYCTA's reliability issues, particularly those of the subway. Within the first few months of his job, Byford was devising long-term plans for the bus and subway systems. In the five subsequent years, the subway's reliability increased from 58 percent to 80 percent. Byford also hired Sarah Meyer as the MTA's "chief customer officer"; for five years, Meyer responded to rider complaints convinced the MTA to change its announcements, posters, and brochures so they were easier for customers to understand.

=== Genius Transit Challenge ===
On May 23, 2017, Cuomo officially announced the Genius Transit Challenge, where contestants could submit ideas to improve signals, communications infrastructure, or rolling stock. The winner of each of the three challenges was to receive a million dollars and have their idea implemented systemwide; MTA employees were outright prohibited from applying. The program drew criticism from industry observers and MTA staff, as it created the perception that outside input was more valued by sheer virtue of coming from outside the agency, rather than any relevant industry experience, such as that of career transportation professionals who actually worked at the agency. The program was marketed to the tech industry and business professionals with little to no transit expertise, and was generally not promoted to private practitioners or researchers within the transportation industry itself. Nineteen finalists for the Genius Transit Challenge were announced in December 2017, out of 438 applicants from 23 countries, most of whom were large companies. Six winning submissions from eight entities were announced in March 2018.

=== Fast Forward report ===
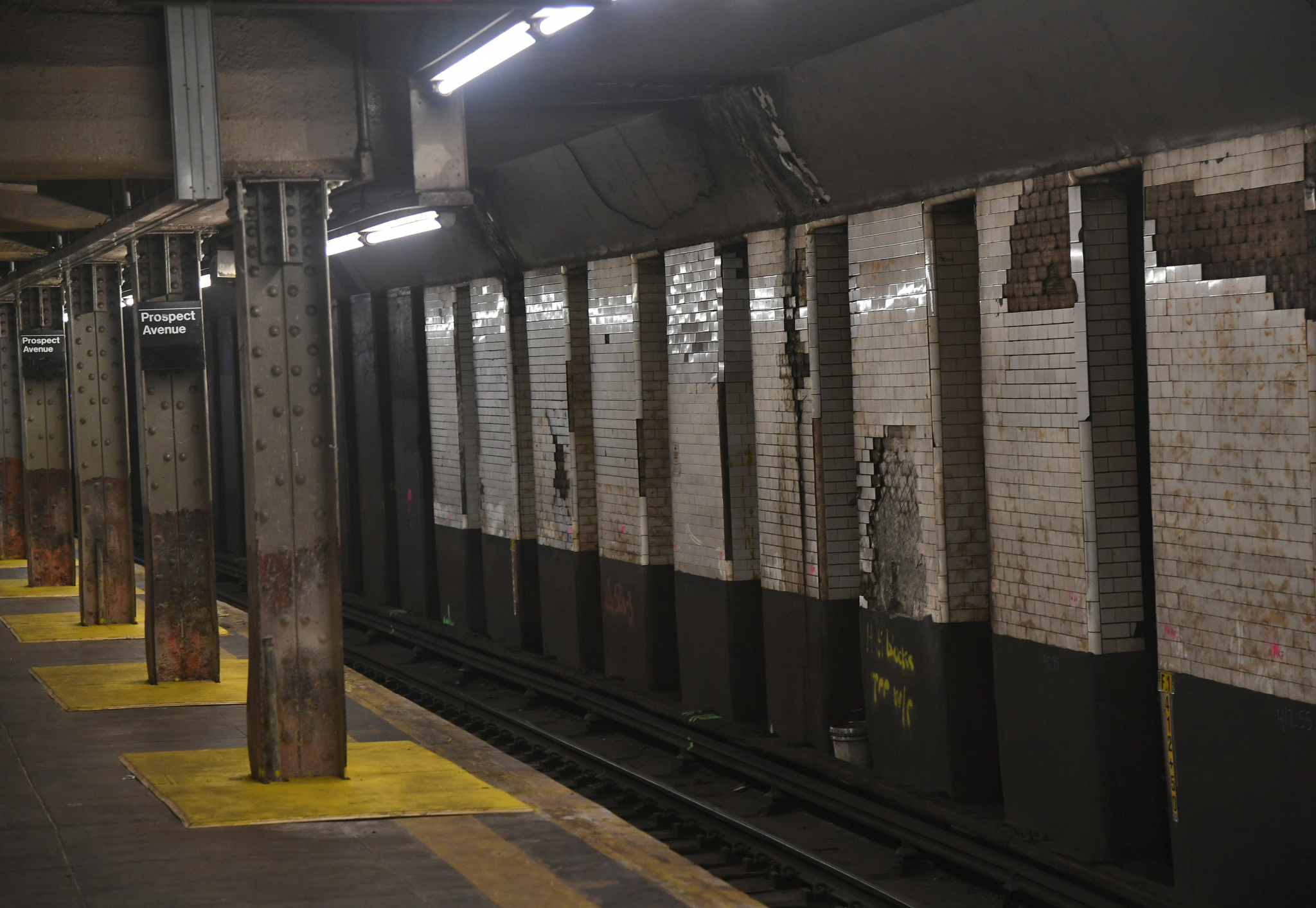
The Prospect Avenue station in 2017, prior to the declaration of the transit crisis; it has since been renovated under the Enhanced Station Initiative

Byford announced his subway and bus modernization plan at a MTA board meeting in May 2018. The plan involved upgrading signals on the subway system's five most heavily used physical lines; making 50 extra stations ADA-accessible; and installing an automatic train supervision system for routes that did not already have that system, which would help monitor train locations. The bus system would be streamlined and reorganized to make the service more reliable. The plan would cost $43 billion over 15 years, including an initial expenditure of $19 billion over the first five years.

Ten lines would receive automated signaling system by 2028. In addition to increase capacity, and to reduce reliance on important interlockings, potential route changes will be evaluated. Also part of the plan was a new fare payment system that was to be implemented by 2020, as well as 3,650 new subway cars to be ordered by 2028, including 650 cars to be ordered by 2023. The program to add 50 more ADA-accessible stations during the 2020–2024 Capital Program would allow most riders to have an accessible station every two or three stops, and it would be more than double the 19 stations outlined in the then-current 2015–2019 MTA Capital Program. Byford's May 2018 proposal also included suggestions to improve the bus system. As part of the plan, the Staten Island express bus and Bronx local bus network would be re-evaluated, and bus priority measures would be added and enforced. Bus stops would be consolidated for faster service, and existing bus stops would be improved with bus shelters and real-time travel information. To get the MTA to work more efficiently, employee communications, processes, and hierarchies would also be reorganized. Conditions at stations will be improved through the appointment of "group station managers" to stations within a geographic area.

In order to keep trains moving, New York City Transit started evaluating twenty places where signal timers affect service the most. Signal timers were added across the system since the fatal 1995 Williamsburg Bridge subway crash, so trains would be spaced further apart, thereby increasing safety. Some timers were installed in places where extra train spacing was unnecessary, increasing delays and reducing capacity. In addition, some timers had stopped functioning properly, forcing train operators to operate more slowly to ensure that their train did not activate the automatic braking system if they passed the signals at too high a speed. As part of Byford's plan, New York City Transit would ensure that signal timers were being cleaned and are functioning. In fall 2018, two new initiatives would begin on selected lines to reduce delays. The first initiative would ensure that train crews would be at the terminal to allow their train to leave on time, while the second would add countdown clocks for train operators so they can maintain speeds.

Under the Fast Forward report, New York City Transit would conduct a one-year pilot program in which it would increase off-peak bus frequencies on the Q6, Q69, B17, B65, and S93 bus routes in Queens, Brooklyn and Staten Island. These improvements would be implemented between September 2018 and January 2019. The Bx6 local bus route in the Bronx would also get articulated buses by January 2019 in order to increase passenger capacity. A separate program would involve removing every other stop on the Q22 route in Queens, as well as adjusting schedules and short turning certain bus trips based on demand, in order to increase bus reliability. The Q22 changes would become effective in September 2018.

== Long-term effects ==
=== 2018 developments ===
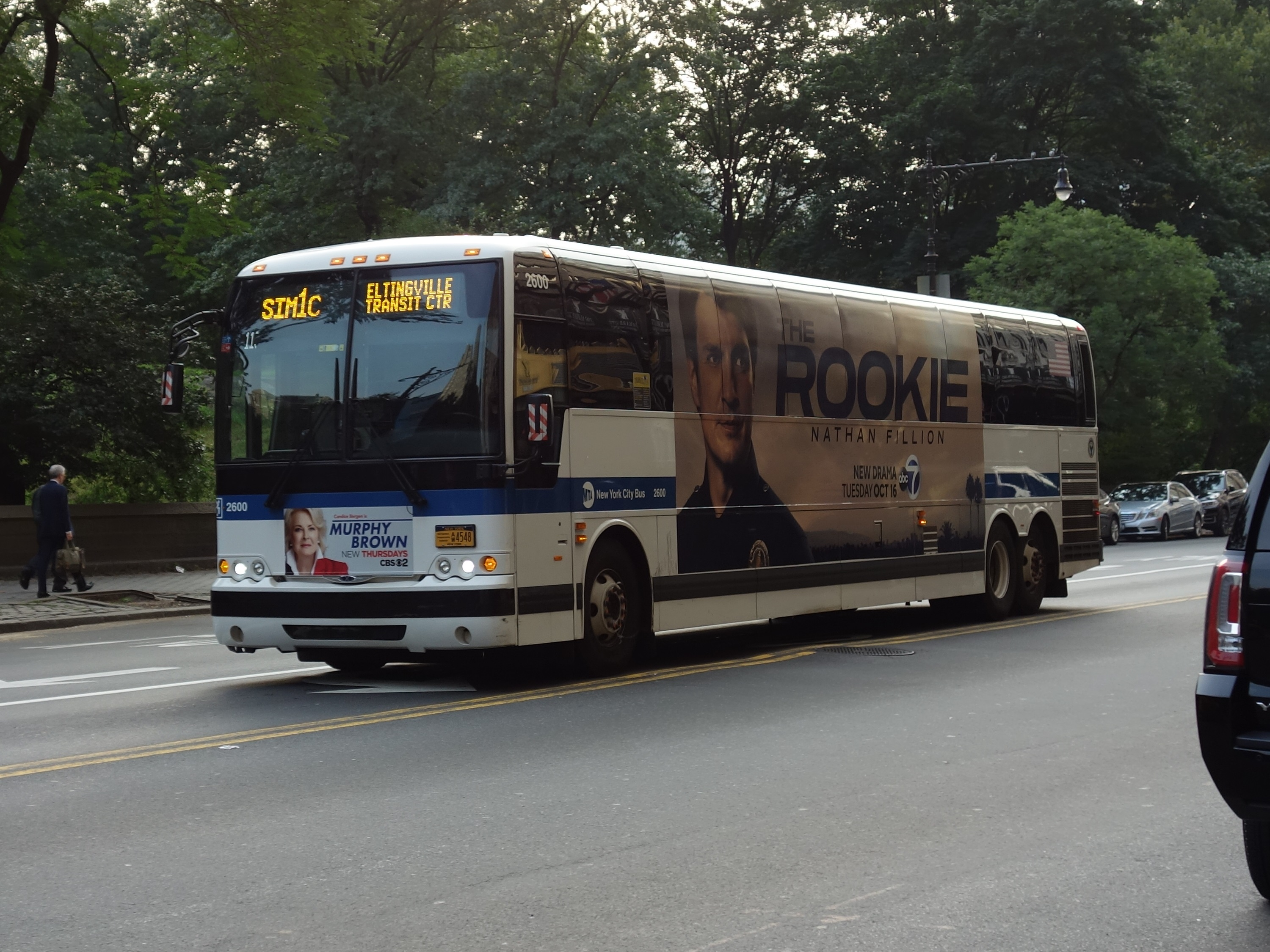
The SIM1 route, one of the bus routes added in the reorganized Staten Island express bus system

The newly reorganized Staten Island express bus network went into effect on August 19, 2018. The following day, Andy Byford held the first town hall for the Fast Forward plan at York College in Jamaica, Queens. In internal emails released the same month, the MTA indicated that as a result of budget cuts, some subway staffing and car-cleaning jobs might be eliminated. In addition, the expansion of Select Bus Service in the outer boroughs would be halted until 2021 while the city's bus network was being re-evaluated.

In the MTA's September 2018 board meeting, Byford stated that the subway was getting better. He said that in 2018, there were fewer major incidents that delayed 50 or more trains compared to in 2017, and the mean distance between failures (MDBF) for trains was higher than in the previous year. However, these figures included major-incident rates that were far above average in January 2018, and the MDBF figures in 2018 were much lower than in 2015. The transit advocacy group Riders Alliance stated that in August 2018, there was only one weekday where the subway system did not experience delays due to signal or equipment malfunctions. Subway trains had a 68% on-time rate in summer 2018; such a low reliability metric had not been seen since the 1970s transit crisis. Byford also stated that, thus far, the MTA had cleaned 285 miles (459 km) of track, fixed 1,300 signals, and modified 1,600 subway cars as part of the Fast Forward plan. At a subsequent event, Byford announced that 23 "group station managers" had been hired to manage groups of up to 25 stations each.

In October 2018, New York state comptroller Thomas DiNapoli published a report stating that the MTA could have $42 billion in debt by 2022. This was exacerbated by the declines in subway and bus ridership, which could not be offset by higher fares alone. Standard & Poor's had already reduced the MTA's credit rating and bond rating from an A+ to an A earlier that year because of the MTA's financial issues and political infighting. Also that October, the MTA launched another competition, this one targeted toward technology companies. There were two challenges: one to reduce traffic congestion along bus routes, and one to predict and alleviate subway delays. With the upcoming 14th Street Tunnel shutdown starting in April 2019, which would suspend service on the L train to Manhattan for a year, the MTA and New York City Department of Transportation (NYCDOT) finalized their mitigation plans for the shutdown.

Also in October 2018, it was revealed that the decline in subway ridership had accelerated in summer 2018, with a 2.5% decrease in weekday trips and an 8.8% decrease in weekend trips from August 2017 to August 2018. In a 60 Minutes television segment about the state of the subway, published on October 21, it was mentioned that the increasing delays had led to dissatisfied customers who, in some cases, had physically assaulted conductors. In the segment, Byford described how communications-based train control (CBTC) implementation was the key part of his Fast Forward plan, and that as a result of an investment of $800 million in emergency funds, critical maintenance of the subway was being carried out. However, though on-time performance had increased slightly since the plan's implementation, riders did not notice the improvements for the most part, according to Byford. By December 2018, the MTA had identified 130 locations in the subway system where the speed limit could be increased (or in some cases, doubled), as well as 267 faulty timer signals that needed to be fixed.

After the failure of the congestion pricing bill in early 2018, officials decided to look for other ways to fund the subway. In December 2018, an urban policy think tank proposed legalizing marijuana for non-medical uses in New York state, then collecting a tax to fund the New York City transit system. The same month, the MTA announced that as many as four percent of subway riders and 16 percent of bus riders each day might not be paying fares, amounting to 208,000 subway riders and 384,000 bus riders per day. This indicated that the decline in ridership on the subway and bus systems might not be as severe as previously indicated, because ridership counts only included riders who paid fares. In response, Byford stated that the MTA was studying ways to physically prevent fare evaders from jumping over subway turnstiles, or entering the rear doors of buses where they did not need to pay.

=== 2019 developments ===
In early January 2019, Cuomo announced that the 14th Street Tunnel would not completely shut down. Following the announcement, Cuomo stated that he wanted to "blow up" the MTA and restructure its entire operating hierarchy. The governor cited frequent cost overruns for MTA contracts, as well as a lack of clear leadership in the agency, as reasons to rearrange the agency. A few days later, de Blasio promised to improve the bus system in his State of the City address. His plan included raising bus speeds by 25% by the next year, increasing the enforcement of bus lanes, and adding bus priority signals to 1,200 intersections with traffic lights.

Also in January 2019, the MTA announced that a new fleet of about 1,500 R262 subway cars, to be built in the 2020s, would replace the R62 and R62A fleets, which were built in the 1980s and are used on the subway system's numbered routes, in order to expedite CBTC on the Lexington Avenue Line. The MTA also announced that 95% of signal timers had been tested, resulting in the discovery of 320 faulty timers, and that 68 locations were improved for increases in speed limits. Byford also promoted some of the other changes made under the Subway Action Plan, including sealing leaks; improving drainage; repairing tracks and signal components; and replacing subway car components. One facet of the Subway Action Plan, a $9.5 million contract for an extensive cleaning of 3,000 subway cars and 100 stations, almost resulted in a strike among unionized subway cleaners. The strike was averted when the MTA ensured that the contract would be for a one-time cleaning and agreed to have two unionized workers at each cleaning site.

In February 2019, Cuomo and de Blasio jointly announced a plan that outlined ten steps to fix MTA operations. Under this plan, similar operations in the MTA's subsidiaries would be combined, a form of congestion pricing would be enacted, a cap on fare increases would be reduced to 2% a year, and the Subway Action Plan would be sped up. To reduce unnecessary costs and delays, a fare evasion prevention strategy would be created, and new project contracts would be awarded as design–build contracts. In addition, board members' terms were tied to those of the official who appointed them, the MTA's capital programs would be reviewed by a committee of independent analysts, and the MTA would undergo an independent financial audit. The MTA, city, and state of New York would work with the state legislature to enact these provisions. Shortly after, Speaker of the New York City Council Corey Johnson unveiled a competing proposal to cede control of the city's subway and bus systems to the city.

The MTA released another progress report in March 2019, stating that the subway's on-time rate had increased to 76%. However, a New York Times analysis of the data found that the gains were not spread equally: the A Division (numbered services and the 42nd Street Shuttle) had an average on-time rate of 79%, compared to the B Division (lettered services) 68% on-time rate. The disparity was attributed to the Automatic Train Supervision system used on much of the A Division; the CBTC signaling system used on the IRT Flushing Line (7 and <7> trains); and the opening of the Second Avenue Subway, which alleviated congestion on the IRT Lexington Avenue Line (4, 5, 6, and <6> trains). At the end of the month, the state approved a congestion pricing plan, to go into effect by 2021 at the earliest. The congestion pricing plan was supposed to be implemented in June 2024 but was delayed by Cuomo's successor, Kathy Hochul, who postponed it to January 2025.

As part of state legislation passed in April 2019, the MTA was supposed to create a plan to reduce costs by the end of June. Additionally, that May, federal prosecutors started investigating alleged overtime fraud at the MTA, especially at the LIRR, which was thought to contribute to higher spending by the MTA. Following this, in July 2019, an MTA reorganization plan was published; the plan called for consolidating the MTA's 40 departments into six groups, as well as eliminating 2,700 jobs.

Two incidents affected the subway system in July 2019. The first was the Manhattan blackout of July 13, 2019, which resulted in suspended or limited service on most lines going through Midtown Manhattan for several hours. The MTA closed four Manhattan stations, and all of the A Division routes suffered extensive delays. The second incident occurred less than a week later, during the rush hour of July 20, 2019, and in the midst of a citywide heat wave: an ATS system issue caused service on most of the A Division routes to be suspended for more than an hour.

In September 2019, the MTA released a draft of their proposed $54 billion 2020–2024 capital plan. The draft calls for adding accessible features to 66 additional subway stations and adding CBTC or other modern signaling systems to parts of six more physical lines. Additionally, the Second Avenue Subway would be completed. Much of the funding would come from the new Manhattan congestion charge. A draft plan for a reorganization of Bronx bus routes was proposed in draft format in June 2019, and a final version was published in October 2019. This was followed by the publication of the Queens bus route reorganization draft in December 2019. During that year, annual subway ridership figures increased, reversing a ridership decline that had been ongoing since 2015.

=== 2020 developments ===
On January 15, 2020, New York City Comptroller Scott Stringer delivered a letter to Byford, demanding that the MTA develop, and make public, plans for restoring the "abundance" of shuttered entry points along New York City Subway routes currently contributing to severe overcrowding and longer commute times. A week later, on January 23, 2020, Byford officially resigned his position at the NYCTA, citing frequent conflicts with Cuomo. The New York Times later wrote that these conflicts had been gradual disagreements, rather than any single event, but that the "Byford-Cuomo estrangement was highly unusual", since New York state governors and MTA chiefs had previously interacted very little prior to the mid-2010s. Byford subsequently left New York to become Commissioner of Transport for London.

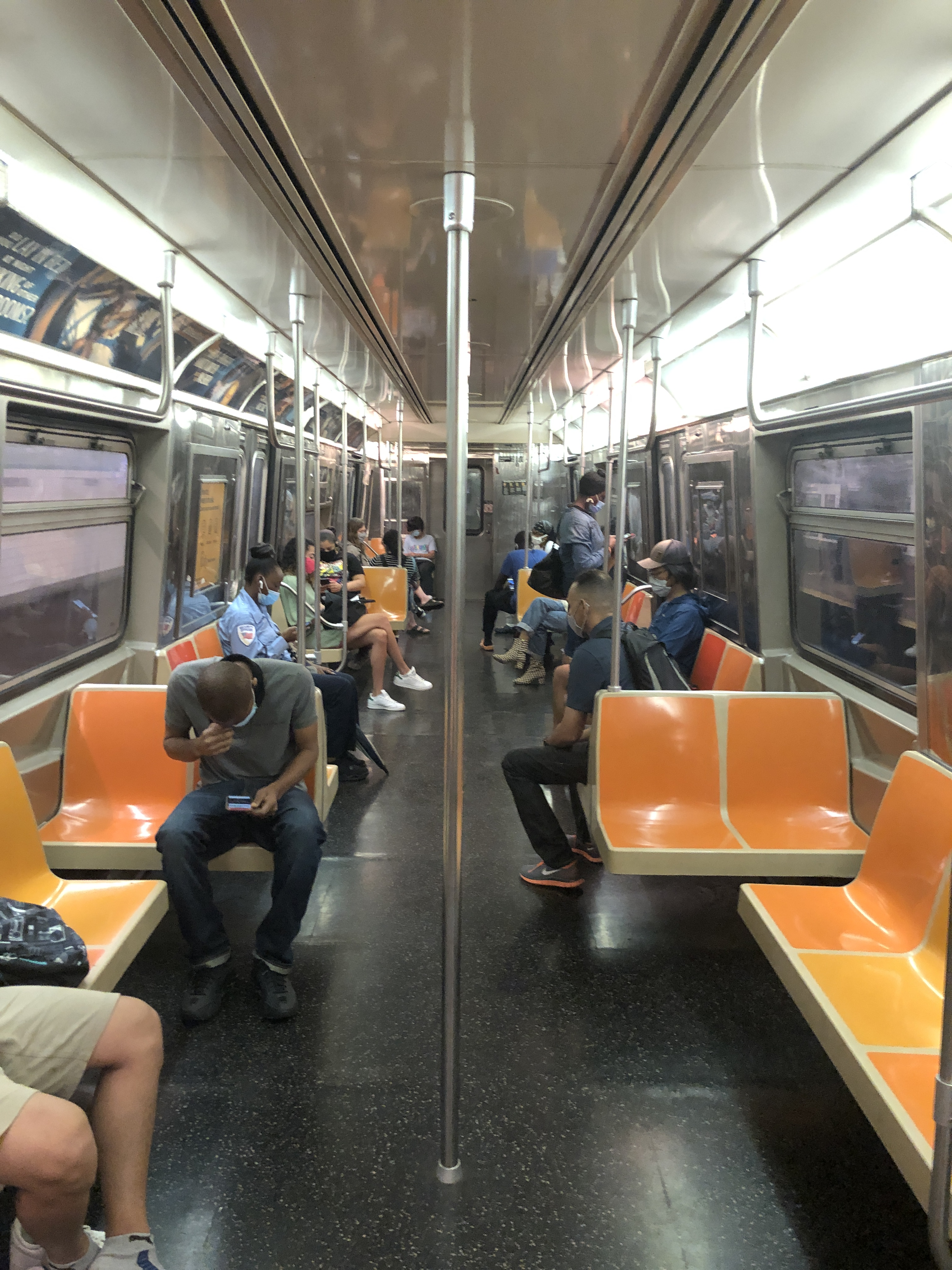
During the COVID-19 pandemic, People seen with face masks practicing social distancing.

In March 2020, the spread of the COVID-19 pandemic to New York state, and thus to the New York City area, resulted in mass closures of gathering spaces such as restaurants and schools. Though the subway, bus, and railroad systems remained open, ridership across all modes of transportation started to decrease, after the MTA recommended that only essential workers use the public transit system. On buses, riders were instructed to use the back door, making the bus system effectively fare-free. Following a 50% to 90% drop in ridership on all of the MTA's systems, the agency requested $4 billion in federal funds, since the decreased fare revenue left the already-struggling agency in a financially tenuous position. By March 25, following further ridership decreases, service on buses, subways, and commuter rail was reduced to at most 75% of their regular service levels. The subway system's five part-time services, the B, C, W, Z, and 42nd Street Shuttle, were temporarily suspended. Despite this, because of increased headways between trains, smaller ridership decreases were reported in poorer neighborhoods than in wealthier areas, and trains were reportedly crowded, despite social distancing guidelines put into place during the pandemic. After at least 41 MTA workers had died and 6,000 others had gotten sick or self-quarantined by April 8, many workers alleged that the MTA had done too little to protect workers from contracting COVID-19, even as up to 40% of daily trips had to be canceled due to crew shortages.

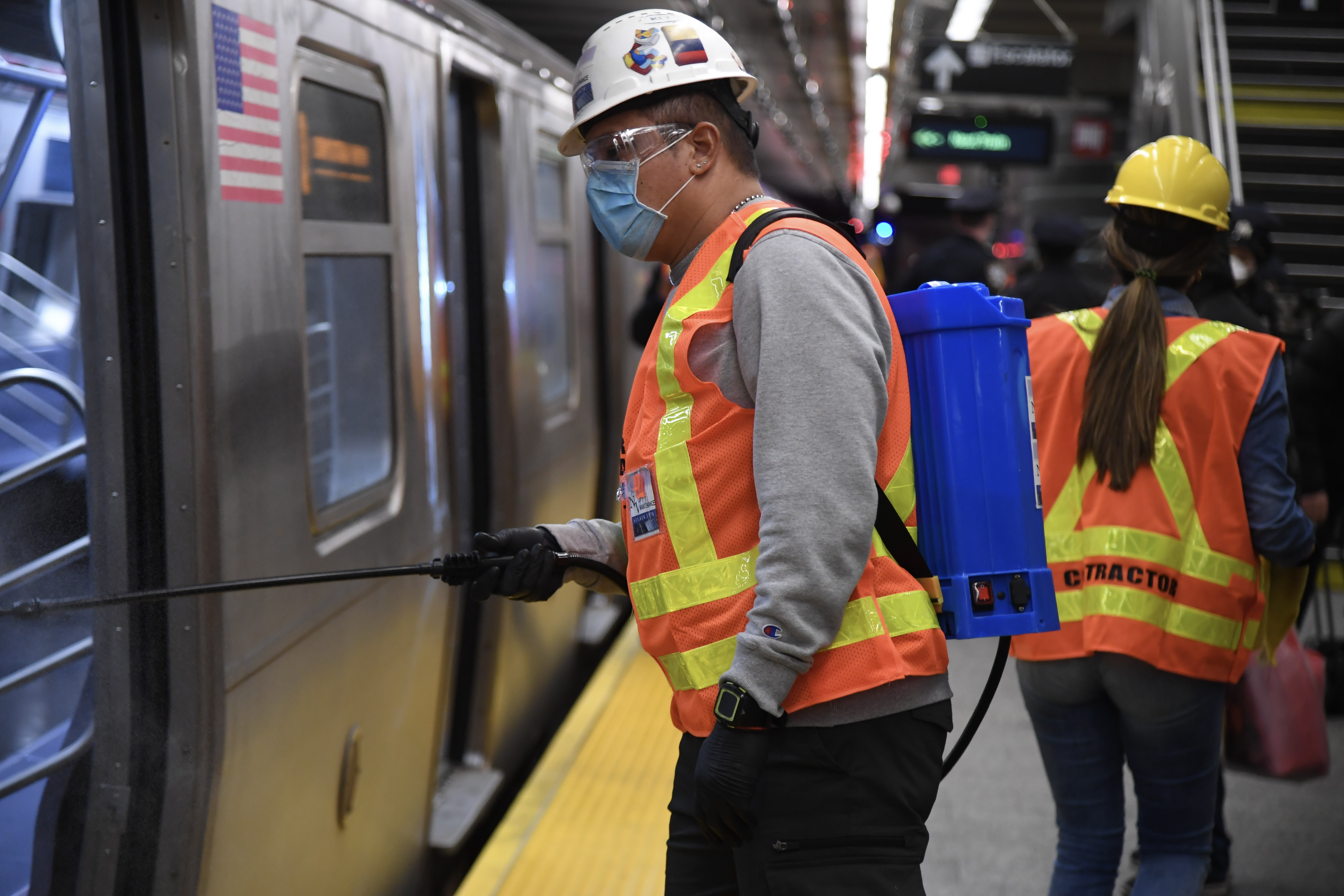
Due to the COVID-19 pandemic, the subway began temporary overnight closures in May 2020, the first such planned closure in the system's history.

By mid-April, ridership on the subway had decreased by 92% due to the pandemic. Bus ridership dropped less, with some routes retaining up to half their normal ridership. To cover a potential revenue shortfall of up to $8.5 billion, the MTA faced having to cut service more permanently, or deferring capital improvements, even though transit experts said that the New York metropolitan area could not function without an effective transit system. On April 20, four City Council members requested that subway service be temporarily suspended due to the spread of COVID-19 in the subway system, but interim New York City Transit president Sarah Feinberg opposed it. Other politicians such as de Blasio advocated for shutting down some terminal stations overnight to clean the trains. The number of homeless individuals in the subway had also increased, a situation that Cuomo described as "disgusting and disrespectful". Starting on May 6, 2020, stations were closed overnight for cleaning, in what became the first planned overnight closure in the subway's history. The overnight closures would be a temporary measure that would be suspended once the pandemic was over, and during the overnight closures, bus service was added. During the closures, trains and stations were cleaned more than usual. Although officials stated that only one percent of subway ridership occurred at night, trains continued to run overnight, leading to complaints that essential workers were being unnecessarily inconvenienced. Internal MTA sources stated that it was theoretically possible for the MTA to clean the system without closing it. The NYCTA also announced that families of workers who died of COVID-19 would be eligible for $500,000 in death benefits.

Ridership on the subway started to increase at the end of May, as the rate of new COVID-19 cases decreased, though bus ridership had surpassed subway ridership. On June 8, regular service resumed with Phase 1 of the city's reopening, though the overnight subway closure remained in place. Two weeks later, MTA Chairman Pat Foye reported that roughly 95 percent of mass transit riders were adhering to wearing face masks in accordance with state executive order No. 202.17 from April 15. From April to June, bus ridership was greater than subway ridership for the first time since the MTA started keeping these records in the 1960s; bus speeds increased on average by 19%. In conjunction with this, in June, de Blasio announced that additional busways would be installed citywide.

Continued budgetary issues forced the MTA to suspend all capital projects "indefinitely" due to a deficit that could grow to $10 billion by 2022. At a meeting in August 2020, the MTA stated that without $12 billion in federal funding to cover operations in 2020 and 2021, the agency would need to take extreme measures such as eliminating capital projects, laying off thousands of staff, raising fares and tolls, cutting Access-A-Ride service, cutting service on the LIRR and Metro-North by 50%, and cutting service on the subway and bus systems by 40%. The MTA was losing $200 million per week at the time. In the wake of such a large deficit, front-door entry on buses was reinstated on August 31. Α report published by the Daily News on September 29 asserted that there was "no correlation" between mass transit and COVID-19 infection rates. However, over 170 transit workers reported being assaulted or harassed for asking passengers to wear face masks, prompting officials to implement a $50 fine for riders who refused to wear a face mask.

=== 2021 and later ===
Following the election of Joe Biden as U.S. president in 2020, the MTA postponed a set of planned "doomsday" changes, since Biden was seen as more friendly to public transit than his opponent, incumbent president Donald Trump. By December 2020, the MTA had decided not to implement a budget that would have resulted in 40% service cuts and massive staff layoffs, under the assumption that Congress would give $4.5 billion of aid to the MTA. With the inauguration of Biden as U.S. president in 2021, transit officials expressed optimism that the Biden administration would allocate funding to congestion pricing. Pete Buttigieg, the U.S. secretary of transportation, prioritized the congestion pricing plan that February.

In February 2021, the overnight closures were shortened to between 2 and 4 a.m. This came after criticism of the overnight closures, which opponents said disproportionately affected minority residents and low-income workers. The same month, the U.S. Congress passed the American Rescue Plan Act of 2021, which provided the MTA with enough money to resume its capital plan. The following month, March 2021, state comptroller Thomas DiNapoli published a report showing that the subway was seeing 2 million daily riders on weekdays. The neighborhoods with the greatest increases in ridership, relative to their March 2020 lows, were generally clustered in low-income neighborhoods in the outer boroughs, while the neighborhoods with the smallest increases were largely in wealthy parts of Manhattan and Brooklyn. In early May 2021, Cuomo announced that the overnight closures would end on May 17, 2021, with 24-hour service resuming on that date.

Many residents expressed reluctance to go back on the system, citing crime rates. In a survey that the MTA conducted in April 2021, 72 percent of 17,000 self-identified frequent riders said they were more concerned with increased crime than with COVID-19 transmission in the subway, while 36 percent of riders who stopped using the system since the pandemic said they were reluctant to return to the system due to their concerns over crime. There had been six murders in the system in 2020, more than in the previous three years combined, and the number of rapes, robberies, and burglaries was also recorded as having increased that year. The long-term effects of the pandemic also resulted in over 4,000 workers quitting or retiring from the MTA, including 2,600 from the subway division, from 2019 to 2021. This was in part due to a hiring freeze implemented during the pandemic. In June 2021 alone, about 11,000 scheduled runs of subway trains were canceled due to staff shortages. Though the MTA promised to hire more workers, the staff shortage became such a critical issue that, by September 2021, the MTA was asking some of its recently retired workers to temporarily staff subway trains.

The state of emergency ended on June 30, 2021, after previously being renewed 49 times. The bus redesigns, which had been delayed during the pandemic, resumed two months later. The subway system continued to experience difficulties. In August 2021, Kathy Hochul replaced Cuomo as governor, promising that she would not "micromanage" MTA leadership. The same month, a power surge disrupted service on several subway routes, particularly the L train and all numbered routes.
