= Freight Enforcement Partnership =

The Freight Enforcement Partnership is an organisation established in October 2015 in London to police heavy goods vehicles which do not comply with the regulations.

It is made up of the Metropolitan Police Service, the City of London Police, Transport for London (TfL), the Driver and Vehicle Standards Agency and freight industry representatives. It has about 90 staff and has a board chaired by Sir Peter Hendy. It is hoped that this will establish a more effective enforcement and regulatory regime.

It will feed information gained by, among other methods, automatic number plate recognition to the Office of the Traffic Commissioner.
