= Pete Tomlin =

British electrical engineer and transit expert

- Born: United Kingdom
- Occupation: electrical engineer
- Known for: Has worked on upgrading the signals system of four major subway systems

Pete Tomlin is an expert in transit signalling systems, who was employed by the Toronto Transit Commission, the New York City Transit Authority, Hong Kong and the London Underground.

== Signalling systems ==
Tomlin was responsible for installing the signal system on London's Jubilee line, in 1997, and the West Rail and Ma On Shan subway lines in Hong Kong, before coming to Toronto to upgrade the signal system on the Yonge-University Line.

The New York City Transit President Andy Byford hired Tomlin in January 2019, having worked with him in London and Toronto. Byford described his hiring of Tomlin as a "coup", because multiple other systems had wanted to hire him. Tomlin was hired during the middle of a hiring freeze.

According to the New York Daily News, it was his expertise in upgrading the signal infrastructure subways use that put him in demand. Many major cities share the problem of their most used lines approaching or occasionally exceeding their maximum passenger carrying capacity. Improving the signals system allows trains to run closer together and more frequently, increasing a subway line's passenger capacity. It can postpone the need for new parallel lines to be installed.

In describing the challenge of gradually replacing a subway line's signals system, while it is still in use, Tomlin said “A colleague of mine once described it like … conducting open-heart surgery on a 100-year-old person while he’s eating his lunch.”

Byford repeatedly clashed with Governor Andrew Cuomo, and resigned on January 15, 2020. Tomlin resigned nine days later, on January 24, 2020.
