= Mike Brown (transport executive) =

Northern Irish-English transport planner and executive

Mike Brown CBE MVO FRICS FCILT

Commissioner of Transport for London
- In office 24 September 2015 – 29 June 2020
- Preceded by: Sir Peter Hendy
- Succeeded by: Andy Byford

Personal details
- Born: 14 April 1964 (age 61)

Michael William Tuke Brown (born 14 April 1964) is a British transport executive who was the Commissioner of Transport for London from September 2015, upon his appointment by Mayor of London Boris Johnson, until June 2020.

== Career ==
Brown started work for London Underground in 1989, rising to become its Chief Operating Officer in 2003. From 2008 to 2010, he moved to be Managing Director of Heathrow Airport. In 2010, he was appointed Managing Director of London Underground and London Rail.

On 16 July 2015, Brown became Interim Commissioner of Transport for London after the departure of Sir Peter Hendy. In September 2015, he was appointed commissioner on a permanent basis by the TfL board. Following the November 2016 Croydon tram derailment, he was one of two top Transport for London (TfL) officials to decline a performance bonus.

As of June 2017, Brown is a board member of London and Partners, chair of the Strategic Transport Apprenticeship Taskforce, and chair of the National Skills Academy for Rail.

In October 2019, TfL announced that Brown would be leaving his role as Commissioner in May 2020 to chair the Delivery Authority for the restoration of the Houses of Parliament.

In June 2022, he was appointed Chair of the Rail Safety and Standards Board.

== Honours and awards ==
Brown was appointed Member of the Royal Victorian Order (MVO) in the 2002 Birthday Honours "for services to the Golden Jubilee" for his work at TfL during what has been called "one of the Underground’s greatest-ever organisational challenges".

In 2016, he was awarded an honorary doctorate (LL.D.) by his alma mater, Queen's University Belfast, "for distinction in public service".

In 2020, he was appointed Commander of the Order of the British Empire (CBE) in the 2020 Birthday Honours for services to transport.
