= Andy Lord =

Transport executive (born 1970)

- Lord pictured in 2023

Commissioner of Transport for London
- Incumbent
- Assumed office 7 June 2023
- Preceded by: Andy Byford

Personal details
- Born: 1970 (age 55–56)
- Education: University of Manchester
- Occupation: Director of Operations, British Airways: (2008-2015); Managing Director, London Underground: (2019–2022)

Andrew Lord (born 1970) is the Commissioner of Transport for London, London's most senior transport official. He was appointed on a permanent basis in June 2023, after holding the role on an interim basis from October 2022.

== Early career ==
Educated at Repton School, Lord studied engineering at the University of Manchester, joining British Airways as an Engineering undergraduate in 1989. He then worked at the airline in a variety of roles, becoming Director of Operations in 2008. Leaving British Airways in 2015, Lord worked as a consultant, before joining John Menzies in 2016. Lord has also held director roles at companies and organisations such as NATS and Defence Equipment and Support.

== Transport for London ==
In July 2019, Andy joined Transport for London (TfL), as the managing director of London Underground and TfL Engineering. In February 2022, the Commissioner of Transport for London Andy Byford appointed him Chief Operating Officer of TfL. Following the departure of Andy Byford from TfL in October 2022, Lord became Acting Commissioner. In June 2023, Lord was appointed commissioner of Transport for London on a permanent basis by the TfL board and the mayor of London, Sadiq Khan. This makes him London's most senior transport official. Lord receives a base salary of £395,000, an increase of £40,000 from the previous commissioners. As of 2025, his take home pay was £639,164 – with TfL noting that similar senior executives "earn £2m a year in the private sector".

In July 2025, Lord noted TfL generates a surplus on its operating costs and that "there is only one other city operator in the world [MTR Corporation in Hong Kong] which has an operating surplus" – adding that TfL needs assistance to fund capital projects such as new trains and extensions to the transport network.

=== Accusations against anti-graffiti campaigners ===
In mid 2025, campaign group Looking for Growth (LFG) and journalist Tom Harwood filmed themselves cleaning graffiti off London Underground trains in protest of claimed inaction by TfL. Speaking to the London Assembly in July 2025, Lord claimed that he had evidence that the group had sprayed the graffiti themselves, then cleaned it up. Following freedom of information requests, no evidence surfaced, and Lord was accused of lying and smearing the campaigners. In December, Lord apologised for the claim, admitting that "there hasn’t been any evidence" that cleaners had sprayed graffiti on the trains. Lord noted that TfL and the British Transport Police were "making [...] good progress" on identifying "serial graffiti artists", and around £10 million a year was being spent cleaning graffiti.

Civic offices
Preceded by Andy Byford	Commissioner of Transport for London; 2023–present	Incumbent
