= Andy Byford =

British public transportation executive

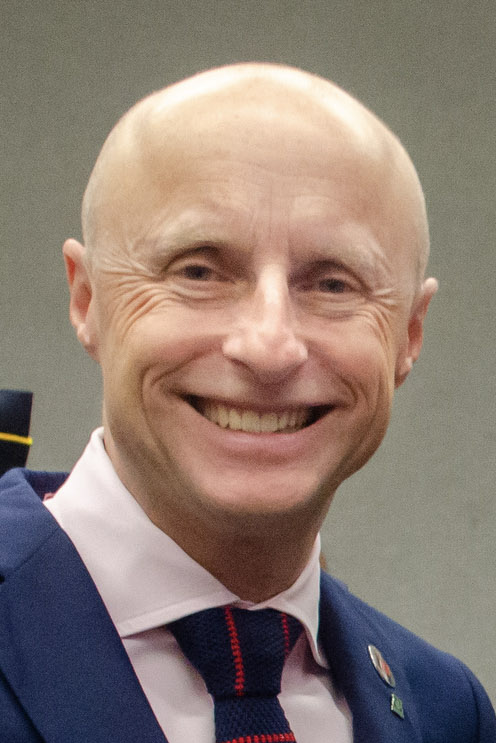
- Byford in New York City in 2019

Commissioner of Transport for London
- In office 29 June 2020 – 25 October 2022
- Preceded by: Mike Brown
- Succeeded by: Andy Lord

President of the New York City Transit Authority
- In office 16 January 2018 – 21 February 2020
- Governor: Andrew Cuomo
- Preceded by: Veronique Hakim
- Succeeded by: Sarah Feinberg (interim)

Chief executive officer of the Toronto Transit Commission
- In office 21 February 2012 – 17 December 2017
- Preceded by: Gary Webster
- Succeeded by: Rick Leary

Personal details
- Born: 1965 (age 60–61) Isle of Sheppey
- Spouse: Alison Byford
- Education: University of Leicester; University of London; University of Pau and the Adour Region

Andrew Byford (born 1965) is a British transport executive who has held several management-level positions in transport authorities around the world, such as the Toronto Transit Commission (TTC), New York City's Metropolitan Transportation Authority (MTA), Transport for London (TfL), and Sydney's then RailCorp. As of 2026, he is a special adviser to Amtrak, working on the redevelopment of New York Penn Station.

== Early life and education ==
Andrew Byford grew up in Plymouth, England, and graduated with double honours in French and German at the University of Leicester. He also holds a certificate and diploma in transport from the University of London and a diplôme supérieur d'études françaises from the University of Pau and Pays de l'Adour.

== Career ==
=== Early career ===
He started work as a graduate trainee for London Underground in 1989, before progressing through a number of operational roles including duty station manager in 1992, group station manager for King's Cross St Pancras Group in 1994, station operations manager for the Jubilee Line Extension in 1996, and train service delivery manager for the Metropolitan, Circle, and Hammersmith & City lines in 1998 before becoming general manager for Customer Service on the Bakerloo, Central, and Victoria lines in 2000.

Byford then moved to main line railway operations, becoming operations and safety director for South Eastern Trains from 2003 to 2006 and subsequently operations director for Southern Railway from 2006 to 2009. He was then approached to become chief operating officer with RailCorp in New South Wales, Australia.

=== Toronto Transit Commission ===
Byford was hired by the Toronto Transit Commission (TTC) in November 2011. Following the firing of Gary Webster, Byford became interim chief general manager (CGM). In March 2012, Byford was promoted as CGM and his role was renamed as CEO.

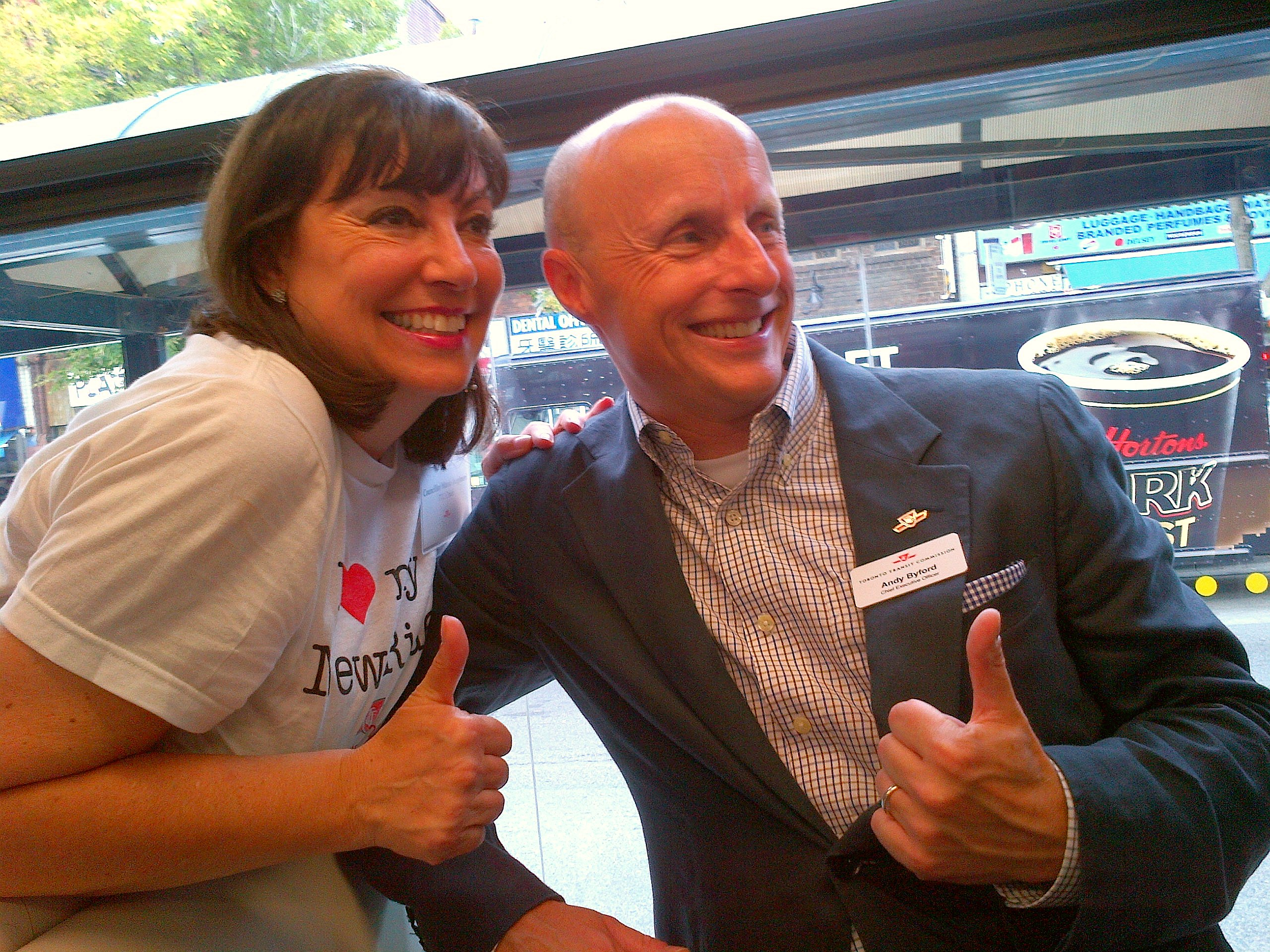
Byford with Toronto City Councillor Maria Augimeri at Spadina Station in 2014

Byford launched a Five-Year Corporate Plan in 2013 to "modernize the TTC", "transform our culture", "renew our equipment", and "update our processes" with a goal to "transform the TTC and deliver on our vision of a transit system that makes Toronto proud". This ambition was realized in June 2017 when the TTC was awarded the American Public Transportation Association (APTA) award for the 2017 Outstanding Transit System of the Year. In reaction to the award, Torontonians noted their experience of frequent delays and overcrowding, and members of a transit advocacy group mocked the award, given the underfunding of the TTC.

Byford was named Toronto's Communicator of the Year (2016) by the International Association of Business Communicators (IABC) in March 2017.

=== Boards, commissions, and panels ===
In June 2014, Byford was invited to serve on New York governor Andrew Cuomo's MTA Transportation Reinvention Commission to review the Metropolitan Transportation Authority (MTA) capital program, and its operations and maintenance practices in particular.

In 2015, Byford served on an APTA panel that reviewed the Boston-area Massachusetts Bay Transportation Authority's handling of winter operations.

In June 2016, Byford served on an international transit CEO panel convened by the Metropolitan Washington Council of Governments to advise the Washington Metro on best practice as it relates to funding, governance and operations. In June 2017, Byford was invited to present best practice to New York governor Cuomo's Genius Transit Challenge conference, as part of a panel of international experts.

In May 2020, Byford served on a Ministerial Advisory Council to advise the Government of Ontario on COVID-19 recovery, as it pertains to mass transit.

A member of the Institution of Railway Operators, Byford is the chair of FlyPlymouth, the company set up to reopen Plymouth City Airport and resume commercial flights from the city.

=== New York City Transit ===
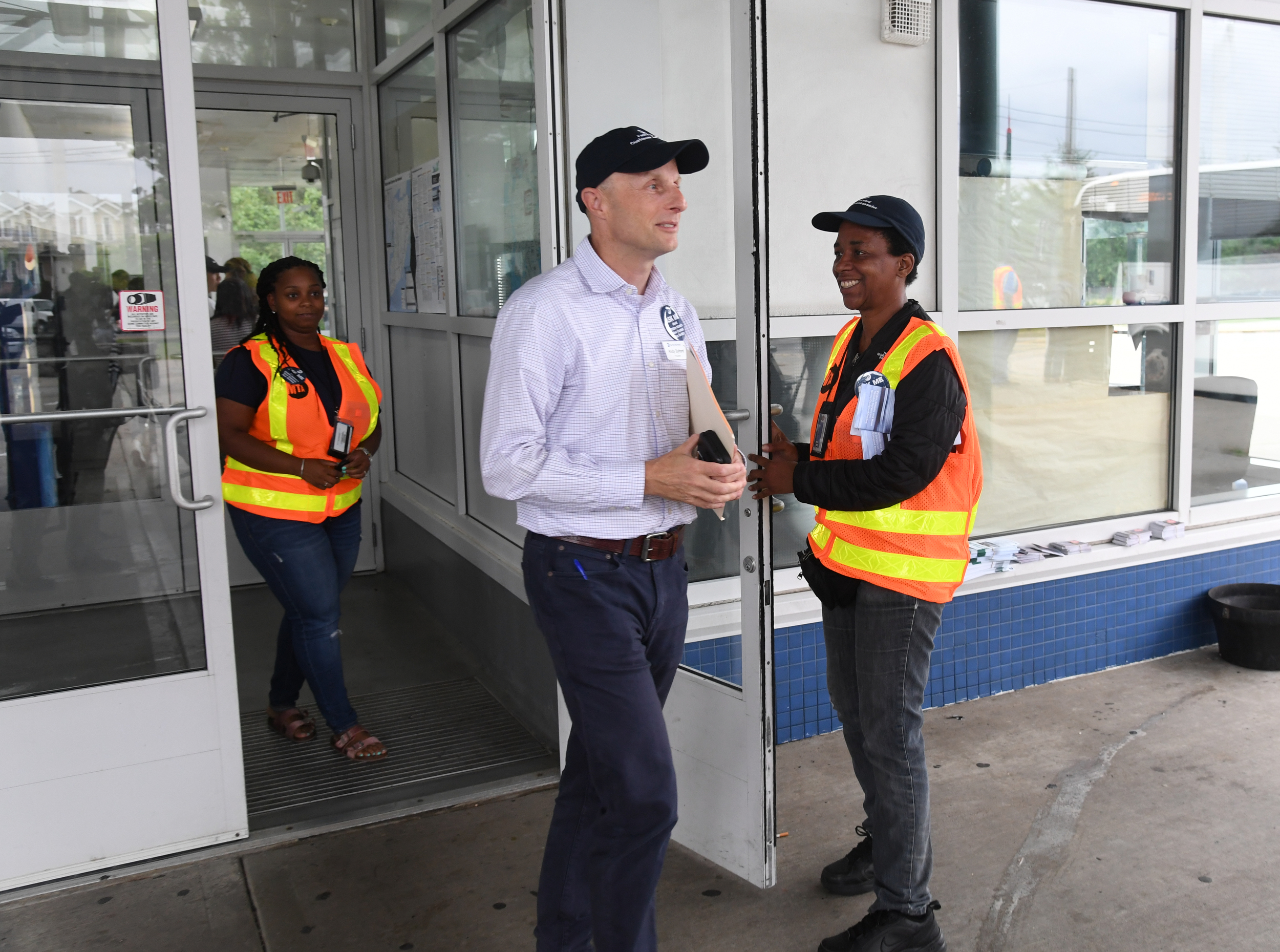
Byford on Staten Island in August 2018

On 21 November 2017, Byford announced he would leave the Toronto Transit Commission in mid-December 2017 to join the Metropolitan Transportation Authority (MTA) in New York City, becoming president of the New York City Transit Authority (NYCTA), where he would lead the modernization of its subway system. His appointment came in the midst of the 2017 New York City transit crisis, a few days after The New York Times published an in-depth investigative report chronicling decades of mismanagement and under-investment by the NYCTA's parent, the MTA. Byford was the second person to have headed both the TTC and the NYCTA, after David L. Gunn. He was also the first non-American director of the New York City Transit Authority. Two of his most prominent hires as president were Pete Tomlin, a transit signaling expert Byford knew from his days in London and Toronto, and Sarah Meyer, a former public relations executive from Edelman, who became the MTA's first chief customer officer.

Within the first few months on the job, Byford was devising long-term plans for the bus and subway systems. At an MTA board meeting in May 2018, he announced the "Fast Forward" program. This included plans to upgrade signals on the subway system's five most heavily used physical lines; making 50 extra stations ADA-accessible; and installing an automatic train supervision system for routes that did not already have it, which would help monitor train locations. Byford's May 2018 proposal also included suggestions to improve the bus system by redrawing local and express bus network in all five boroughs, as well as implementing the contactless OMNY fare system. These reforms earned Byford popularity among New Yorkers, with some giving him the nickname "Train Daddy".

As part of state legislation passed in April 2019, the MTA was supposed to create a plan to reduce costs by the end of that June. A draft of the plan indicated that several departments would be eliminated, undermining Byford's role.

Byford submitted a letter of resignation to the NYCTA in October 2019, but quickly rescinded it. On 23 January 2020, he officially resigned from his position, which took effect on 21 February 2020. News reports suggested that the cause was the "clashes" he had with Governor Andrew Cuomo over several issues, most recently a reduction in his authority. The Guardian wrote: "the final straw may have come after Cuomo reorganized the MTA, the state transport body, stripping Byford of some responsibilities. In his resignation letter, Byford referenced his 'reduced' role." The New York Times said that the "Byford–Cuomo estrangement was highly unusual", since New York state governors and MTA chiefs had previously interacted very little prior to the mid-2010s. Byford was replaced by interim president Sarah Feinberg.

=== Transport for London ===
In May 2020, Byford was appointed commissioner of Transport for London by the Transport for London (TfL) board and the mayor of London, Sadiq Khan. He replaced Mike Brown, making him London's most senior transport official. Byford received a base salary of £355,000, the same salary as the two previous commissioners. During his tenure as TfL commissioner, the authority negotiated a funding deal with the government to guarantee revenue through 2024 as it continued to recover from the COVID-19 pandemic. Byford also oversaw the completion of the long-awaited Elizabeth line, an east–west line directly connecting London suburbs with the core of the city – an achievement which he said was "without doubt, the highlight of my career". The Elizabeth line was officially opened on 17 May 2022, and one of the trains is named after Byford. In September 2022, Byford resigned as TfL commissioner, citing a desire to return to the U.S. and spend more time with his family. Byford left the position in October 2022, following the opening of the final Elizabeth line station, Bond Street.

=== Amtrak ===
In March 2023, it was reported that Byford would start serving as executive vice president in charge of high-speed rail for Amtrak on 10 April 2023. Byford led Amtrak's support for such regional initiatives in Texas, Florida, California, Nevada, the Midwest and along the Eastern Seaboard.

In May 2025, Byford was appointed by the second Trump administration as special advisor to the Amtrak Board of Directors for the redevelopment of New York Penn Station, after the United States Department of Transportation announced the previous month that it had taken over that project from the MTA.

== Personal life ==
Byford married his Canadian-born wife Alison in Ottawa, Ontario, Canada, in 1994. He is known for travelling for work in public transit while in executive positions in Toronto and later New York City. Byford's grandfather was a bus driver for London Transport.

In March 2019, Byford received a Lifetime Achievement Award from the University of Leicester in recognition of his 30-year career in public transport across two continents.

Civic offices
Preceded by Gary Webster as Chief General Manager	Chief Executive Officer of the Toronto Transit Commission; 2012–2017	Succeeded by Rick Leary
Preceded by Veronique Hakim	President of the New York City Transit Authority; 2018–2020	Succeeded by Craig Cipriano (acting)
Preceded by Mike Brown	Commissioner of Transport for London; 2020–2022	Succeeded by Andy Lord
