= Peter Hendy =

British transport executive and politician (born 1953)

The Right Honourable The Lord Hendy of Richmond Hill CBE
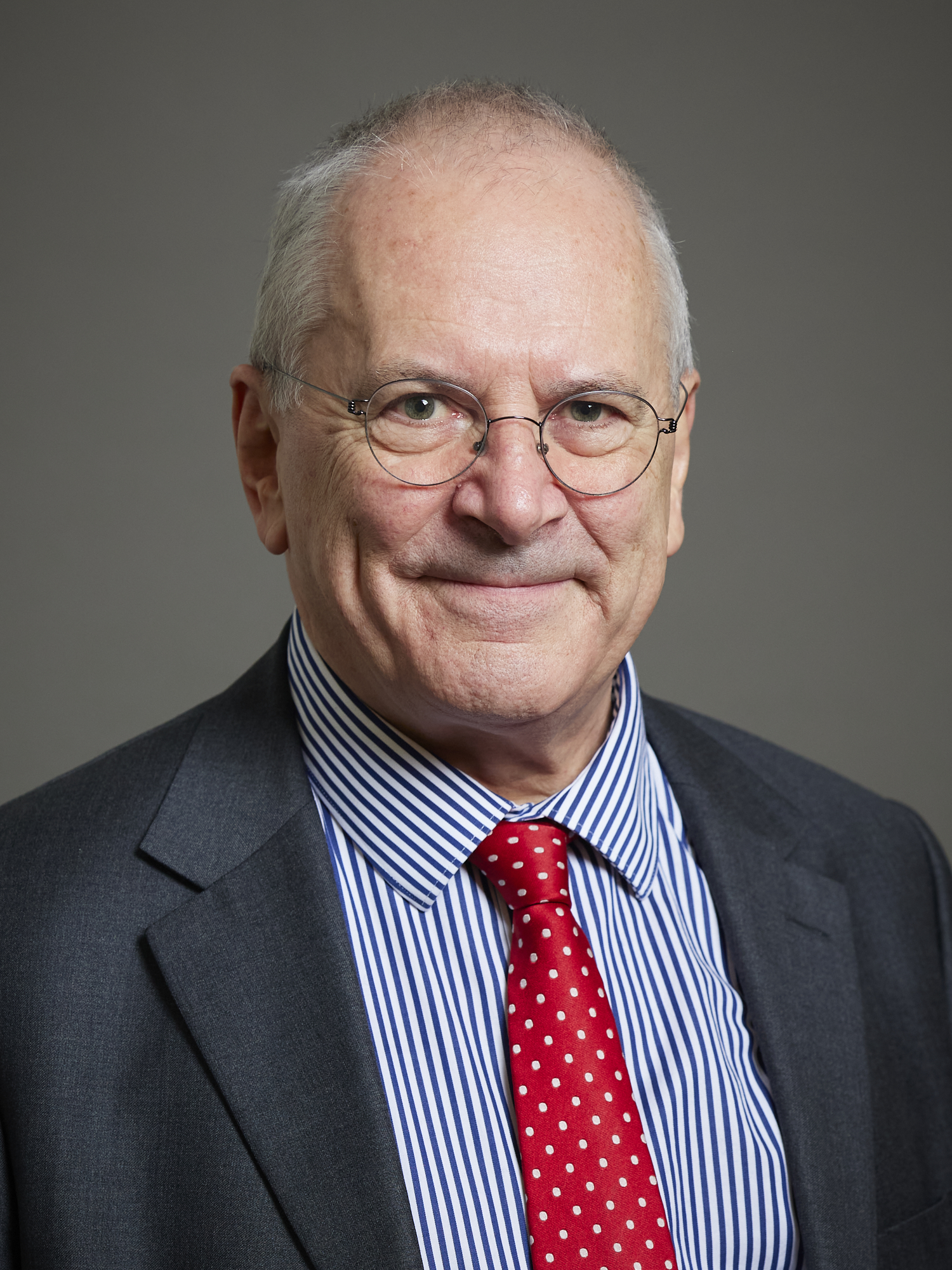
- Official portrait, 2024

Minister of State for Rail
- Incumbent
- Assumed office 8 July 2024
- Prime Minister: Keir Starmer; Andy Burnham
- Preceded by: Huw Merriman

Member of the House of Lords
- Lord Temporal
- Life peerage 17 November 2022

Commissioner of Transport for London
- In office 1 February 2006 – 24 September 2015
- Preceded by: Robert Kiley
- Succeeded by: Mike Brown

Personal details
- Born: Peter Gerard Hendy; 19 March 1953 (age 73)
- Party: Labour (since 2024)
- Other political affiliations: Crossbench (2022–2024)
- Occupation: Managing Director, CentreWest: (1994–1997); Deputy Director, FirstGroup: (1997–2001); Commissioner of Transport for London: (2006–2015); Chairman, Network Rail (2015–2024)

Peter Gerard Hendy, Baron Hendy of Richmond Hill, CBE (born 19 March 1953), is a British transport executive and politician who has served as Minister of State for Rail since July 2024.

== Early life and education ==
Hendy is the younger son of Jack Hendy and the Honourable Mary Best, youngest daughter of Philip George Best, 6th Baron Wynford. His older brother is John Hendy, Baron Hendy KC.

Hendy was educated at Latymer Upper School and the University of Leeds, where he graduated in Economics and Geography in 1975.

== Career ==
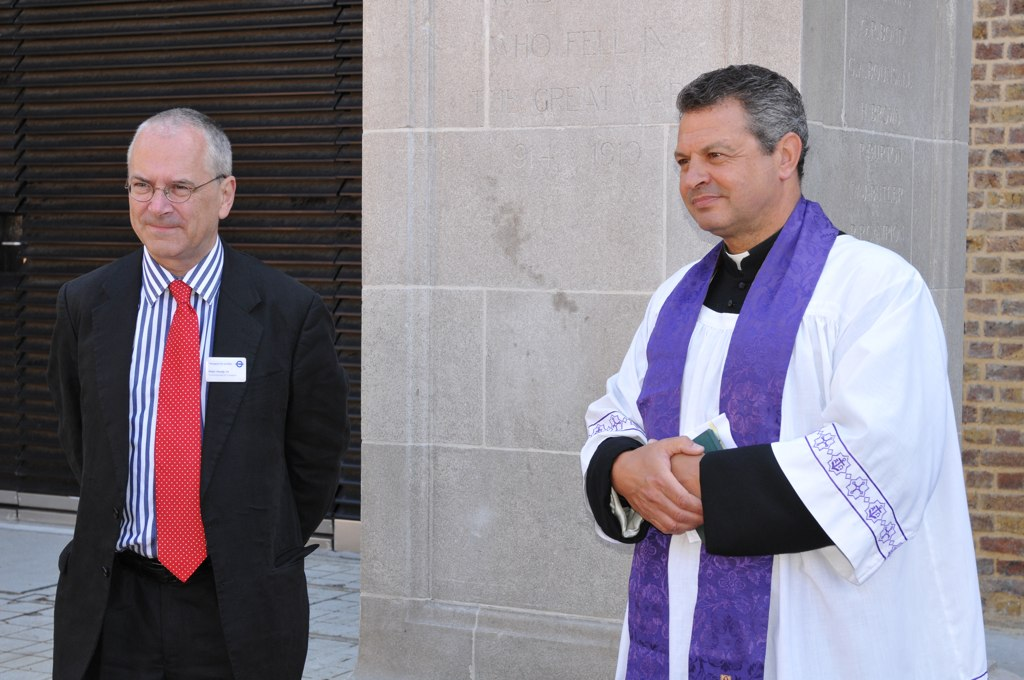
Transport for London's Commissioner, Peter Hendy, and the Revd James Westcott of St Chad's Church

=== London Transport ===
Hendy started his career in the public transport industry in 1975 as a London Transport graduate trainee. He moved up the career ladder, eventually taking on the role of managing director of CentreWest London Buses Ltd in 1989, managing it under London Transport ownership.

=== First Bus ===
In 1994, he led CentreWest through a management buyout with staff involvement, and subsequent expansion. After the takeover of CentreWest by FirstGroup in 1997, Hendy became Deputy Director UK Bus for FirstGroup, responsible for bus operations in London and southern England, bus development, and the operation of Croydon Tramlink. He also became a director of New World First Bus in Hong Kong.

=== Transport for London ===
In 2001, he was appointed to the position of managing director of Surface Transport for Transport for London (TfL), under Ken Livingstone's mayoralty of London. During this period, bus patronage in London grew substantially. On 1 February 2006, he took up the position of Commissioner of Transport for London. He continued in post after the election of Boris Johnson as Mayor of London in 2008.

During the London 2012 Summer Olympic and Paralympic Games, Hendy chaired the 2012 Games Transport Board, which worked with LOCOG, transport operators, local authorities and others to ensure transportation of athletes, officials, staff, media and spectators across London. He was subsequently knighted for his work at the Games. During 2014, Hendy reportedly spent over £1,200 in taxpayer-provided money on lunches and dinners, including on one occasion more than £90 in alcohol. During 2012, Hendy's salary was £650,000.

In February 2015, Hendy was criticised by the Fawcett Society for attending a men-only dinner held by the Transport Golfing Society, as a guest of Alexander Dennis. Hendy apologised and made a personal donation to the Fawcett Society.

In July 2015, Hendy left the position of Commissioner, replaced on an interim basis by Mike Brown (the managing director of London Underground and London Rail).

=== Network Rail ===
In July 2015 he was appointed chair of Network Rail by the then Secretary of State for Transport, Patrick McLoughlin. In June 2023, he was reappointed to the role to serve for a further two years.

In 2024, Hendy pressured engineering consultancy SYSTRA to take disciplinary action against rail engineer Gareth Dennis after he told a reporter for the The Independent that Euston station was "unsafe". Network Rail responded that an improvement notice from the Office of Rail and Road concerning a lack of risk assessments regarding crowding at the station had already been closed. In a further statement the company admitted the station could be “unpleasant and uncomfortable” during crowding, but not unsafe.

SYSTRA dismissed Dennis in early July 2024, stating in an email that he had "brought the name / reputation of SYSTRA Ltd and Network Rail into disrepute", referencing the article and Hendy's complaint about it. At the Railway Industry Association conference in November 2024 – having left Network Rail following his appointment to government – Hendy apologised for suggesting that Network Rail could withhold contracts from a company based on media comments by an employee. Since the controversy, changes have been made at Euston to platform announcements as well as changing an advertising screen to display passenger information.

=== Department for Transport ===
On 8 July 2024 he was appointed to Keir Starmer's new Labour government as a minister of state in the Department for Transport, thereby leaving his role as chairman of Network Rail. In July 2026, he was reappointed to the new government by Andy Burnham.

=== Other appointments ===
Between 2013 and 2015, Hendy was the chairman of International Association of Public Transport.

In 2015, he was appointed Chair of the newly formed Freight Enforcement Partnership.

In July 2017 he was appointed chair of the London Legacy Development Corporation, by the Mayor of London Sadiq Khan, which is developing the Queen Elizabeth Olympic Park.

In July 2019 he was appointed by the then Prime Minister Theresa May as a trustee of the Science Museum Group which incorporates the National Railway Museum in York. Hendy is also an independent trustee of the London Transport Museum. In March 2023, Hendy was appointed chairman of the Heritage Railway Association.

In June 2020, he was appointed chair of the Union Connectivity Review. The terms of reference were published on 3 October 2020. The review was published in November 2021.

He is also the Honorary Chairman of the London Bus Museum.

== Honours ==
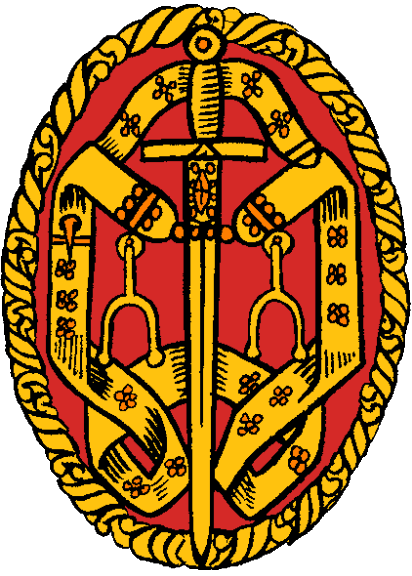
Insignia of Knight Bachelor

Hendy was appointed Commander of the Order of the British Empire (CBE) in the 2006 New Year Honours "for services to Public Transport and to the community in London." Following the successful operation of transport during the 2012 Olympic and Paralympic Games he was knighted for services to transport and the community in the 2013 New Year Honours.

Hendy has been awarded the following honorary degrees: Doctor of Science by City, University of London in 2010; Doctor of Engineering by the University of Bath in 2014; Doctor of Laws by the University of Leeds in 2015; and Doctor of Letters by Queen Mary University of London in 2018.

It was announced on 14 October 2022, that as part of the 2022 Special Honours, Hendy would receive a life peerage. On 17 November 2022, Hendy was created Baron Hendy of Richmond Hill, of Imber in the County of Wiltshire.

== Personal life ==
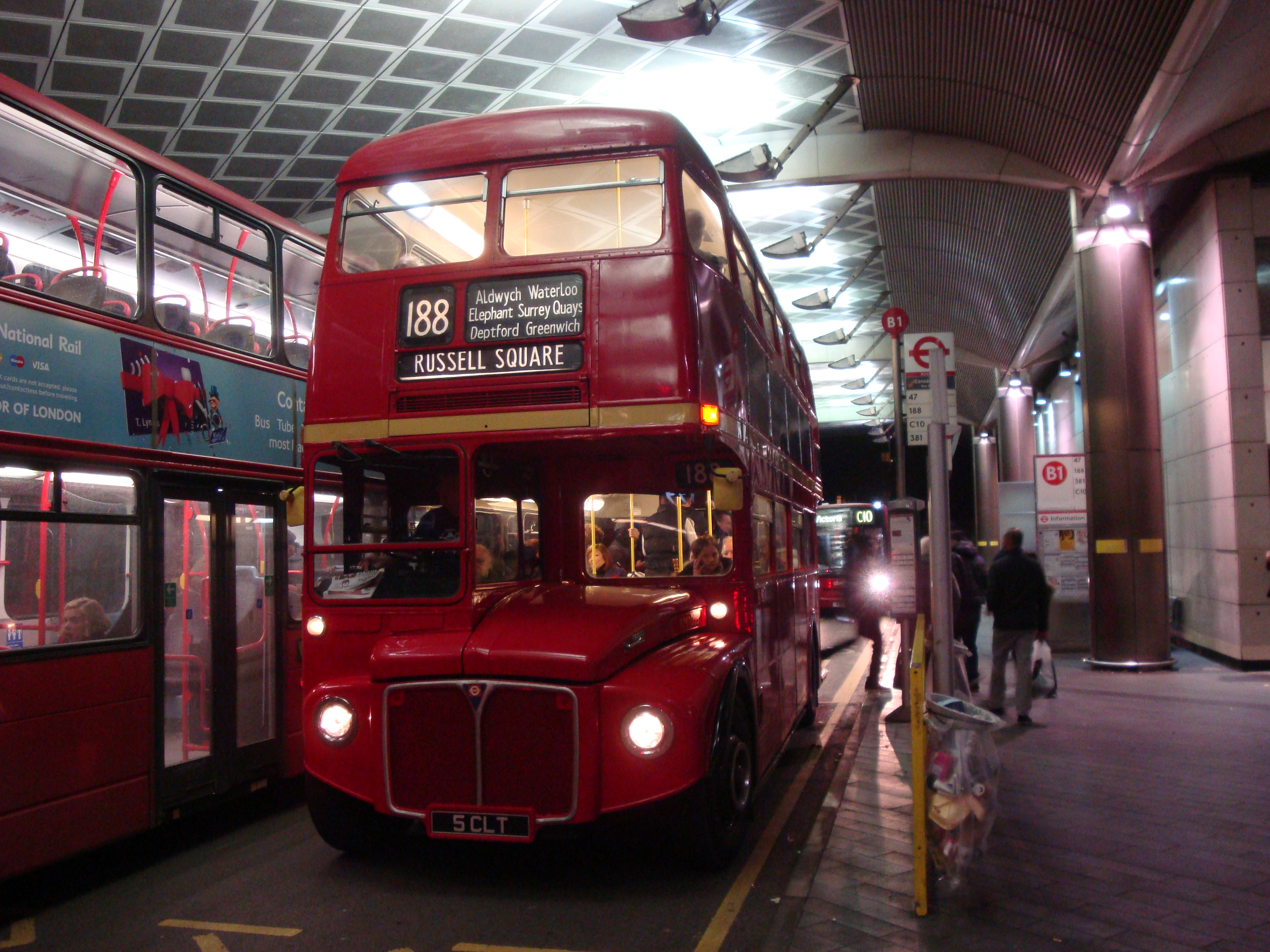
Sir Peter Hendy's RM1005 on Route 188, at Canada Water, London

Hendy is married to Sue Pendle, a human resources consultant; the couple, who live in Richmond, London, have two children.

Hendy owns two roadworthy London AEC Routemaster buses. He is part of the group of organisers of Imberbus, the 23A scheduled bus service that runs once a year, to raise money for charity, to the isolated and abandoned Wiltshire village of Imber, which is surrounded by military firing ranges on Salisbury Plain and is normally closed to the public. On the appointed day in 2019, 28 double-decker buses operated the route at 15-minute intervals from Warminster station.

In 2013, Hendy, who was then the Commissioner of Transport for London, was accused of engaging in a nine-month affair with a call girl (prostitute). She alleged that Hendy provided her with several Oyster cards loaded with £10 as gifts.

In April 2025, Hendy apologised after using his mobile phone while driving a vintage bus through London during rush hour, as part of a charity fundraiser. He was reported to the police for the offence by one of the bus's passengers.

Civic offices
Preceded by Robert Kiley	Commissioner of Transport for London; 2006–2015	Succeeded by Mike Brown
Orders of precedence in the United Kingdom
Preceded by The Lord Jackson of Peterborough	Gentlemen; Baron Hendy of Richmond Hill	Followed by The Lord Prentis of Leeds
