= Smarter Travel =

Transport planning policy in southwest London

The Smarter Travel scheme was an initiative aiming to ease congestion in two southwest London boroughs by enabling and encouraging people to substitute car journeys for more sustainable forms of transport, and to ensure that public transport systems, footpaths and cycle paths were running at optimum capacity.

== Sutton ==
Smarter Travel Sutton was a joint initiative between Sutton London Borough Council and Transport for London. It had a budget of £5 million, and installed new cycle stands in town centres.

Residents of Sutton were offered discounts on bicycles, and cycling equipment. As part of the scheme, individuals employed in Sutton, who did not have access to showers at work, were offered access to shower facilities at the Holiday Inn in Gibson Road.

== Richmond ==
Smarter Travel Richmond was a joint initiative between Richmond upon Thames London Borough Council and Transport for London. It had a budget of £4.3 million, and installed new cycle stands in schools, cycle stands in town centres.
