= Commissioner of Transport for London =

Chief executive of London's transport body

The commissioner of transport for London has management responsibility for Transport for London (TfL) and hence for the transport system throughout the City of London and Greater London in the United Kingdom. TfL is controlled by a board whose members are appointed by the Mayor of London, who also chairs the Board. The commissioner reports to the board and leads a management team with individual functional responsibilities. The commissioner is therefore the most senior transport official in the capital.

== History ==
In 2000, Transport for London (TfL) was created as part of the Greater London Authority, gaining many of its functions from its predecessor, London Regional Transport. The commissioner post was initially held from 2001, by Bob Kiley. His CV included the CIA, CEO of the Massachusetts Bay Transportation Authority, deputy mayor of Boston, Chairman and CEO of the Metropolitan Transportation Authority and President and CEO of the New York City Partnership. He was credited as being the architect of the revival of Boston and New York's ailing public transport systems in the 1970s and 1980s respectively.

Kiley announced his resignation in late 2005, and was replaced in February 2006 by Peter Hendy, previously TfL's Director of Surface Transport. In July 2015, Hendy left to become chairman of Network Rail and was replaced on an interim basis by Mike Brown (the Managing Director of London Underground and London Rail).

Mike Brown was appointed as the new commissioner in September 2015. Following the November 2016 Croydon tram derailment, Brown was one of two top TfL officials to decline a performance bonus. In October 2019, TfL announced that Brown would be leaving his role as commissioner in May 2020 to chair the Delivery Authority for the restoration of the Houses of Parliament.

In May 2020, Andy Byford, former president of the New York City Transit Authority (NYCTA) and former CEO of the Toronto Transit Commission was announced as the new commissioner by the TfL Board. Following the opening of the Elizabeth line, Byford resigned as commissioner in September 2022, citing a desire to return to the U.S. and spend more time with his family. Byford left the position in October 2022, replaced on an interim basis by Andy Lord (the Chief Operating Officer of London Underground).

In June 2023, Andy Lord was appointed commissioner on a permanent basis by the TfL board.

== List of commissioners of transport ==
1. Bob Kiley (2000–2006)
2. Sir Peter Hendy (2006–2015)
3. Mike Brown (2015–2020)
4. Andy Byford (2020–2022)
5. Andy Lord (2023–present)

== See also ==
- List of heads of public transport authorities in London
