= Transport for London =

English transport authority

- Abbreviation: TfL
- Formation: 3 July 2000; 26 years ago (Greater London Authority Act 1999)
- Type: Statutory corporation
- Legal status: Executive agency within GLA
- Headquarters: 5 Endeavour Square, London E20
- Region served: London, England
- Field: Transport authority
- Chairman: Mayor of London (Sadiq Khan)
- Commissioner: Andy Lord
- Main organ: London Underground; London Overground; Elizabeth line; Docklands Light Railway; London Buses; London Streets
- Parent organisation: Greater London Authority (GLA)
- Budget: 2019–20: £10.3 billion (47% of this from fares)
- Staff: 28,000
- Website: tfl.gov.uk

Integrated schematic map of all railway services managed by TfL presently and in the near future

Transport for London (TfL) is a local government body responsible for most of the transport network in London, United Kingdom.

TfL is the successor organisation of the London Passenger Transport Board, which was established in 1933, and several other bodies in the intervening years. Since the current organisation's creation in 2000 as part of the Greater London Authority (GLA), TfL has been responsible for operating multiple urban rail networks, including the London Underground and Docklands Light Railway, as well as London's buses, taxis, principal road routes, cycling provision, trams, and river services. It does not control all National Rail services in London, although it is responsible for London Overground and Elizabeth line services. The underlying services are provided by a mixture of wholly owned subsidiary companies (principally London Underground), by private-sector franchisees (the remaining rail services, trams and most buses) and by licencees (some buses, taxis and river services). Fares are controlled by TfL, rail services fares calculated using numbered zones across the capital.

TfL has overseen various initiatives and infrastructure projects. Throughout the 2000s, a new radio communication system was implemented across its underground lines. Passenger convenience systems, such as the Oyster card and contactless payments, were also provisioned around this time. During 2008, the consumption of alcohol was banned on TfL services; this move has led to a decrease in anti-social behaviour. On 16 August 2016, TfL oversaw the launch of the Night Tube scheme, which introduced through-the-night services on both the London Underground and London Overground. Perhaps the biggest undertaking it has been responsible for, in this case shared jointly with the national Department for Transport (DfT), was the commissioning of the Crossrail Project; since its completion in 2022, TfL has been responsible for franchising its operation as the Elizabeth line.

In addition to the GLA, the central British government used to provide regular funding for TfL. However, this was tapered off during the 2010s with the aim of the organisation becoming self-sufficient. Direct central government funding for operations ceased during 2018. During 2019–2020, TfL had a budget of £10.3 billion, 47% of which came from fares; the remainder came from grants, mainly from the GLA (33%), borrowing (8%), congestion charging and other income (12%). In 2020, during the height of the COVID-19 pandemic, fare revenues dropped by 90% and TfL obtained multiple rounds of support from the British government. It also responded with various cutbacks, including a proposal for a 40% reduction in capital expenditure.

== History ==
Logo prior to 2013

London's transportation system was unified in 1933, with the creation of the London Passenger Transport Board, which was succeeded by London Transport Executive, London Transport Board, London Transport Executive (GLC), and London Regional Transport. From 1933 until 2000, these bodies used the London Transport brand.

Transport for London was created in 2000 as part of the Greater London Authority (GLA) by the Greater London Authority Act 1999. The first Commissioner of TfL was Bob Kiley. The first chair was then-Mayor of London Ken Livingstone, and the first deputy chair was Dave Wetzel. Livingstone and Wetzel remained in office until the election of Boris Johnson as Mayor in 2008. Johnson took over as chairman, and in February 2009 fellow-Conservative Daniel Moylan was appointed as his deputy.

Transport for London Corporate Archives holds business records for TfL and its predecessor bodies and transport companies. Some early records are also held on behalf of TfL Corporate Archives at the London Metropolitan Archives.

On 17 February 2003, the London congestion charge was introduced, covering the approximate area of the London Inner Ring Road. The congestion charge had been a manifesto promise by Ken Livingstone during the 2000 London mayoral election. It was introduced to reduce congestion in the centre of the capital as well as to make London more attractive to business investment; the resulting revenue was to be invested in London's transport system. At the time of its implementation, the scheme was the largest ever undertaken by a capital city.

During 2003, TfL took over responsibility for the London Underground, after terms for a controversial public-private partnership (PPP) maintenance contract had been agreed. While the Underground trains themselves were operated by the public sector, the infrastructure (track, trains, tunnels, signals, and stations) were to be leased to private firms for 30 years, during which these companies would implement various improvements. The two consortiums awarded contracts were Tube Lines and Metronet. In July 2007, following financial difficulties, Metronet was placed in administration and its responsibilities were transferred back into public ownership under TfL in May 2008. During 2009, Tube Lines, having encountered a funding shortfall for its upgrades, was denied a request to TfL for an additional £1.75 billion; the matter was instead referred to the PPP arbiter, who stated that £400 million should be provided. On 7 May 2010, Transport for London agreed to buy out Bechtel and Amey (Ferrovial), the shareholders of Tube Lines for £310 million, formally ending the PPP.

TfL was heavily impacted by multiple bombings on the Underground and bus systems on 7 July 2005. Numerous TfL staff were recognised in the 2006 New Year honours list for the actions taken on that day, including aiding survivors, removing bodies, and restoring the transport system so that millions of commuters were able to depart London at the end of the workday. (Note: Those mentioned include Peter Hendy, who was at the time Head of Surface Transport division, and Tim O'Toole, head of the Underground division, who were both appointed CBEs. Others included David Boyce, Station Supervisor, London Underground (MBE); John Boyle, Train Operator, London Underground (MBE); Peter Sanders, Group Station Manager, London Underground (MBE); Alan Dell, Network Liaison Manager, London Buses (MBE) and John Gardner, Events Planning Manager (MBE).) The incident was heavily scrutinised, leading to various long-term changes being proposed by groups such as London Assembly, including the accelerated implementation of underground radio connectivity.

On 20 February 2006, the DfT announced that TfL would take over management of services then provided by Silverlink Metro. On 5 September 2006, the London Overground branding was announced, and it was confirmed that the extended East London line would be included. On 11 November 2007, TfL took over the North London Railway routes from Silverlink Metro. At the launch, TfL undertook to revamp the routes by improving service frequencies and station facilities, staffing all stations, introducing new rolling stock and allowing Oyster pay as you go throughout the network from the outset. This launch was accompanied by a marketing campaign entitled "London's new train set", with posters and leaflets carrying an image of model railway packaging containing new Overground trains, tracks and staff.

On 1 June 2008, the drinking of alcoholic beverages was banned on Tube and London Overground trains, buses, trams, Docklands Light Railway and all stations operated by TfL across London but not those operated by other rail companies. Carrying open containers of alcohol was also banned on public transport operated by TfL. The then-Mayor of London Boris Johnson and TfL announced the ban with the intention of providing a safer and more pleasant experience for passengers. There were "Last Round on the Underground" parties on the night before the ban came into force. Passengers refusing to observe the ban may be refused travel and asked to leave the premises. The GLA reported in 2011 that assaults on London Underground staff had fallen by 15% since the introduction of the ban.

TfL funded two joint schemes in the London Borough of Richmond upon Thames and London Borough of Sutton, called Smarter Travel, which promoted the use of cycling and other forms of sustainable transport.

Between 2008 and 2022, TfL was engaged in the Crossrail programme to construct a new high-frequency hybrid urban–suburban rail service across London and into its suburbs. TfL Rail took over Heathrow Connect services from Paddington to Heathrow in May 2018. In August 2018, four months before the scheduled opening of the core section of the Elizabeth line, it was announced that completion had been delayed and that the line would not open before autumn 2019. Further postponements ensued. Having an initial budget of £14.8 billion, the total cost of Crossrail rose to £18.25 billion by November 2019, and increased further to £18.8 billion by December 2020. On 17 May 2022, the line was officially opened by Queen Elizabeth II in honour of her Platinum Jubilee.

TfL commissioned a survey in 2013 which showed that 15% of women using public transport in London had been the subject of some form of unwanted sexual behaviour but that 90% of incidents were not reported to the police. In an effort to reduce sexual offences and increase reporting, TfL—in conjunction with the British Transport Police, Metropolitan Police Service, and City of London Police—launched Project Guardian. In 2014, TfL launched the 100 years of women in transport campaign in partnership with the Department for Transport, Crossrail, Network Rail, the Women's Engineering Society and the Women's Transportation Seminar (WTS). The programme was a celebration of the significant role that women had played in transport over the previous 100 years, following the centennial anniversary of the First World War, when 100,000 women entered the transport industry to take on the responsibilities held by men who enlisted for military service.

As early as 2014, an Ultra–Low Emission Zone (ULEZ) was under consideration under London Mayor Boris Johnson. Johnson announced in 2015 that the zone covering the same areas as the congestion charge would come into operation in September 2020. Sadiq Khan, Johnson's successor, introduced an emissions surcharge, called the Toxicity Charge or "T-Charge", for non-compliant vehicles from 2017. The Toxicity Charge was replaced by the Ultra Low Emission Zone on 8 April 2019, which was introduced ahead of schedule. On 29 August 2023, the ULEZ was expanded to cover all 32 London boroughs, bringing an additional five million people into the zone.

During 2020, passenger numbers, along with associated revenue, went into a sharp downturn as a result of the COVID-19 pandemic in the United Kingdom. In response, TfL services were reduced; specifically, all Night Overground and Night Tube services, as well as all services on the Waterloo & City line, were suspended from 20 March, while 40 tube stations were closed on the same day. The Mayor of London and TfL urged people to only use public transport if absolutely essential so that it could be used by critical workers. The London Underground brought in new measures on 25 March to combat the spread of the virus; these included slowing the flow of passengers onto platforms via the imposition of queuing at ticket gates and turning off some escalators. In April, TfL trialled changes encouraging passengers to board London buses by the middle doors to lessen the risks to drivers, after the deaths of 14 TfL workers including nine drivers. This measure was extended to all routes on 20 April, and passengers were no longer required to pay, so that they did not need to use the card reader near the driver.

== Organisation ==
Geographical map showing the route of railway services managed by TfL

TfL is controlled by a board whose members are appointed by the Mayor of London, a position held by Sadiq Khan since May 2016. The Commissioner of Transport for London reports to the Board and leads a management team with individual functional responsibilities.

The body is organised in two main directorates and corporate services, each with responsibility for different aspects and modes of transport. The two main directorates are:

- London Underground, responsible for running London's underground rail network, commonly known as the tube, and managing the provision of maintenance services by the private sector. This network is sub-divided into different service delivery units:
  - London Underground
    - Deep Tube: Bakerloo, Central, Victoria, Waterloo & City, Jubilee, Northern and Piccadilly lines.
    - SSL (Sub Surface Lines): Metropolitan, District, Circle and Hammersmith & City lines.
  - Elizabeth line, a high-frequency hybrid urban–suburban rail service on dedicated infrastructure in central London (built as part of the Crossrail Project); and on National Rail lines to the east and west of the city. Operation is undertaken by GTS Rail Operations, a private-sector concessionaire, and maintenance by Network Rail.
- Surface Transport, consisting of:
  - Docklands Light Railway (DLR): an automatically driven light metro network in East and South London, although actual operation and maintenance is undertaken by a private-sector concessionaire (KeolisAmey, a joint venture of Keolis and Amey).
  - London Buses, responsible for managing the red bus network throughout London and branded services including East London Transit and Superloop, largely by contracting services to various private sector bus operators. Incorporating CentreComm, London Buses Command & Control Centre, a 24-hour Emergency Control Centre based in Southwark.
  - London Dial-a-Ride, which provides community transport services for elderly and disabled people throughout London.
  - London Overground, which consists of certain suburban National Rail services within London. Operation is undertaken by First Rail London, a private-sector concessionaire, and maintenance by Network Rail. It contains six lines: the Mildmay line, Lioness line, Suffragette line, Windrush line, Weaver line and Liberty line.
  - Sponsored Services and Regulatory Compliance, responsible for licensing the black cab taxis, private hire vehicles, pedicabs, regulating micromobility schemes, London Service Permits for buses and coaches, and managing the Woolwich Ferry and schemes sponsored by TfL including London cable car and Santander Cycles.
  - London Trams, responsible for managing London's tram network, by contracting to private sector operators. At present the only tram system is Tramlink in South London, contracted to FirstGroup, but others are proposed.
  - London congestion charge, a fee charged on most cars and motor vehicles being driven within the Congestion Charge Zone in Central London.
  - Victoria Coach Station, which owns and operates London's principal terminal for long-distance bus and coach services.
  - Transport for London Road Network, which consists of Transport for London red routes, London's strategic road network.
  - Community Safety, Enforcement and Policing, responsible for tackling fare evasion on buses, delivering policing services that tackle crime and disorder on public transport in co-operation with the Metropolitan Police Service's Transport Operational Command Unit (TOCU) and the British Transport Police.
  - Walking and Cycling Commissioner
    - Promotes cycling in London, including the construction of cycle paths and Cycle Superhighways.
    - Promotes better pedestrian access and better access for walking in London.
  - Freight Unit, which has developed the "London Freight Plan" and is involved with setting up and supporting a number of Freight Quality Partnerships covering key areas of London.

=== Operations centre ===
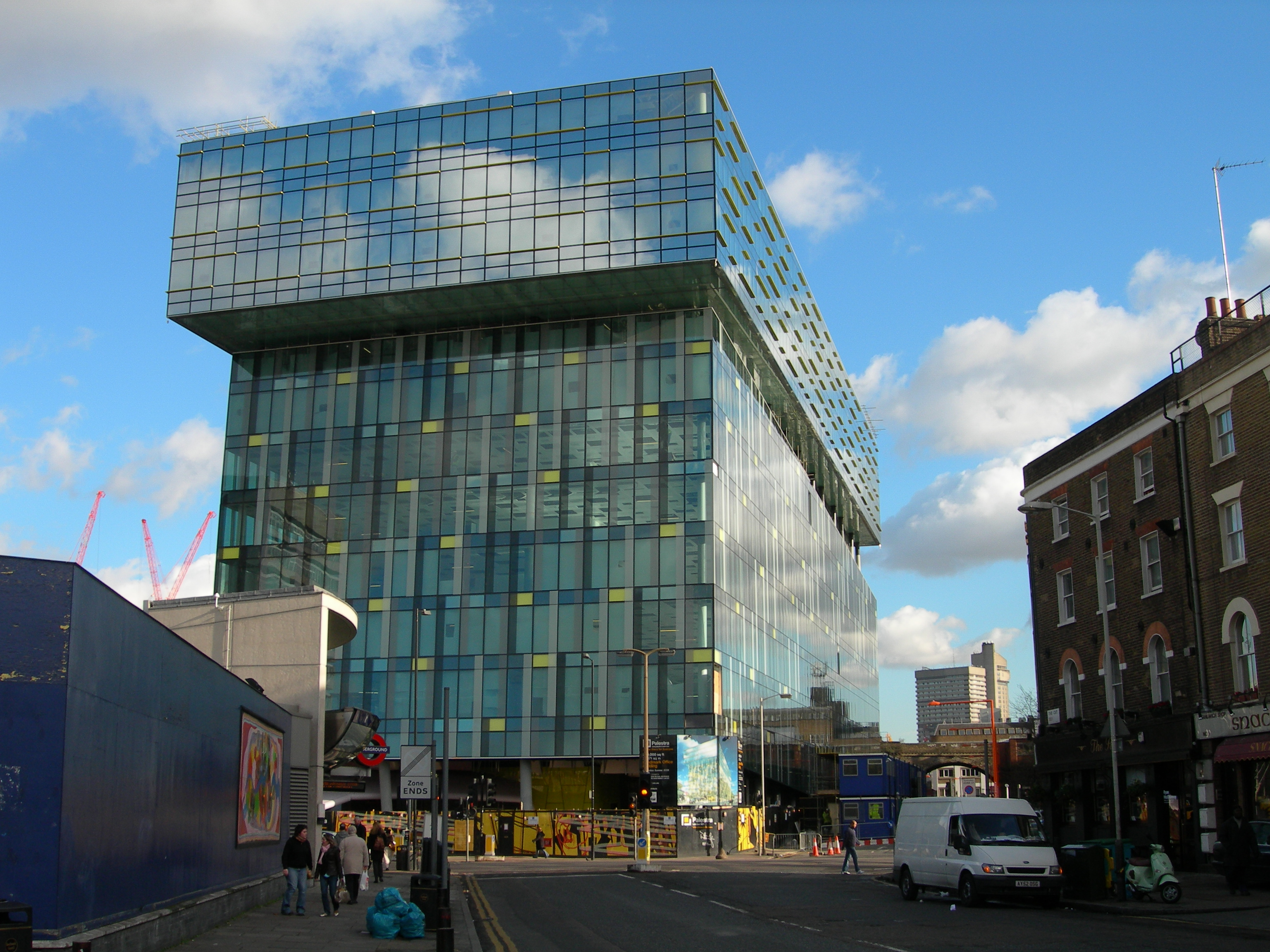
The Palestra building, home to TfL's Surface Transport and Traffic Operations Centre (STTOC)

TfL's Surface Transport and Traffic Operations Centre (STTOC) was officially opened by the then Prince Andrew, Duke of York (later Andrew Mountbatten-Windsor), in November 2009. The centre monitors and coordinates official responses to traffic congestion, incidents and major events in London. Network Management Control Centre (manages the bus network) (NMCC), London Streets Traffic Control Centre (LSTCC) and the Metropolitan Police Traffic Operation Control Centre (MetroComm) were brought together under STTOC.

STTOC played an important part in the security and smooth running of the 2012 Summer Olympics. The London Underground Network Operations Centre is now located on the fifth floor of Palestra and not within STTOC. The centre featured in the 2013 BBC Two documentary series The Route Masters: Running London's Roads.

=== Places for London ===
Places for London is the property-owning arm of Transport for London. Launched in 2015, it was re-branded as Places for London in 2023, as part of a programme of homebuilding. As of 2024, it owns and manages over 5,500 acres (2,200 ha) of land throughout London, making it one of the city's largest landowners. Places for London plans to build 20,000 new homes across London by the 2030s, with around half of them being affordable housing. TfL plans to reinvest profits made by Places for London back into the transport network, similar to the Rail + Property model used by the MTR Corporation in Hong Kong.

=== Connect project ===
Transport for London introduced the "Connect" project for radio communications during the 2000s, to improve radio connections for London Underground staff and the emergency services. The system replaced various separate radio systems for each tube line, and was funded under a private finance initiative. The supply contract was signed in November 1999 with Motorola as the radio provider alongside Thales. Citylink's shareholders are Thales Group (33 per cent), Fluor Corporation (18%), Motorola (10%), Laing Investment (19.5%) and HSBC (19.5%). The cost of the design, build and maintain contract was £2 billion over twenty years. Various subcontractors were used for the installation work, including Brookvex and Fentons.

A key reasoning for the introduction of the system was in light of the King's Cross fire disaster, where efforts by the emergency services were hampered by a lack of radio coverage below ground. Work was due to be completed by the end of 2002, although suffered delays due to the necessity of installing the required equipment on an ageing railway infrastructure with no disruption to the operational railway. On 5 June 2006, the London Assembly published the 7 July Review Committee report, which urged TfL to speed up implementation of the Connect system.

The East London line was chosen as the first line to receive the TETRA radio in February 2006, as it was the second smallest line and a mix of surface and sub-surface. That same year, it was rolled out to the District, Circle, Hammersmith & City, Metropolitan and Victoria lines, with the Bakerloo, Piccadilly, Jubilee, Waterloo & City and Central lines following during 2007. The final line, the Northern, was handed over in November 2008.

The 2010 TfL investment programme included the project "LU-PJ231 LU-managed Connect communications", which provided Connect with a new transmission and radio system comprising 290 cell sites with two to three base stations, 1,400 new train mobiles, 7,500 new telephone links and 180 CCTV links.

=== London Transport Museum ===
TfL also owns and operates the London Transport Museum in Covent Garden, a museum that conserves, explores and explains London's transport system heritage over the last 200 years. It both explores the past, with a retrospective look at past days since 1800, and the present-day transport developments and upgrades. The museum also has an extensive depot, situated at Acton, that contains material impossible to display at the central London museum, including many additional road vehicles, trains, collections of signs and advertising materials. The depot has several open weekends each year. There are also occasional heritage train runs on the Metropolitan line.

=== Financing ===
The majority of TfL's funding is provided by the GLA and the Mayor of London. Traditionally, the British government via the Department for Transport (DfT) also used to contribute considerably; however, throughout the 2010s, there was a concerted drive by the Conservative government to reduce central government expenditure on TfL, and that the organisation ought to pursue self-sufficiency and make greater efforts to generate its own revenue to supplement its grants. Accordingly, the operational budget of almost £700 million per year provided by the DfT by 2015 was to be entirely eliminated by 2020.

By February 2018, TfL was projecting a budget deficit of £1 billion, a roughly five-fold increase from 2013, which reportedly threatened its long-term investment plans. Revenue collected from fares was set to make up a greater proportion of TfL's budget, yet a £240 million downturn in ticket sales by mid-2018 had been recorded. In September 2019, a TfL application for government funding to upgrade the Piccadilly Line was rejected by the Treasury. That same month, TfL head Mike Brown publicly criticised the government's decision to impose borrowing limits upon the organisation, and there was little long term certainty in terms of funding, necessitating pauses on multiple upgrade programmes.

On 22 April 2020, amid the COVID-19 pandemic, London mayor Sadiq Khan warned that TfL could run out of money to pay staff by the end of the month unless the government stepped in. Two days later, TfL announced it was furloughing around 7,000 employees, about a quarter of its staff, to help mitigate a 90% reduction in fare revenues. Following the implementation of a lockdown in London on 23 March, Tube journeys had reportedly fallen by 95% and bus journeys by 85%, though TfL continued to operate limited services to allow "essential travel" for key workers. Without government financial support for TfL, London Assembly members warned that Crossrail, the Northern line extension and other projects such as step-free schemes at tube stations could be delayed.

On 7 May, it was reported that TfL had requested £2 billion in state aid to keep services running until September 2020. On 12 May, TfL documents warned it expected to lose £4 billion due to the pandemic and said it needed £3.2bn to balance a proposed emergency budget for 2021, having lost 90% of its overall income. Without an agreement with the government, deputy mayor for transport Heidi Alexander said TfL might have to issue a Section 114 notice - the equivalent of a public body going bust. On 14 May, the UK Government agreed £1.6 billion in emergency funding to keep Tube and bus services running until September - a bailout condemned as "a sticking plaster" by Khan who called for agreement on a new longer-term funding model.

On 1 June 2020, TfL released details of its emergency budget for 2020–2021; it involved a reduction in capital investment by 39% from £1.3 billion to £808 million along with cuts to maintenance and renewal spending by 38% to £201 million. In November 2021, the then Transport Secretary Grant Shapps criticised reports that senior TfL officials would be offered bonuses potentially in excess of £12 million per year in return for efforts to help break-even. By December 2021, the British government and the Mayor of London had implemented three consecutive short-term funding agreements cumulatively costing in excess of £4b to avert closures of several bus routes and tube lines.

In August 2022, additional British government support was granted to TfL; the organisation was still unable to meet all spending commitments. In response, a new facility was established to balance TfL's budget via the provision of up to £500 million; this facility restricted the GLA's future financial flexibility. During late 2023, TfL issued further urgent calls for long-term funding to support its operations; it claimed that the British government would need to provide one quarter of its capital investment plans for 2024. The Department of Transport's position has been that long term funding for TfL should be provided via the Mayor of London, and that in excess of £6 billion in extraordinary funding has already been provided.

=== Passenger safety and crime prevention ===
TfL publishes operational data on transport crime and antisocial behaviour in coordination with the British Transport Police and the Metropolitan Police Service, monitoring trends across the network and encouraging offence reporting to improve passenger confidence.

During the mid-2020s, passenger surveys indicated growing concerns about personal safety on the TfL network, including fears of robbery, threatening behaviour, and antisocial conduct, with some respondents reporting that these concerns had deterred them from using public transport. Police linked elevated levels of violent incidents and hate crime on the transport network to international events, including the Israel–Gaza conflict that began in late 2023, and the associated wave of pro-Palestinian protests in London. TfL has stated that it is working with law enforcement and partner agencies to prevent hate crimes and other incidents experienced by passengers, and in October 2025 launched a campaign encouraging Londoners to act as 'active bystanders' and support victims of hate crime and abuse on the transport network.

== Fares ==
Most of the transport modes that come under the control of TfL have their own charging and ticketing regimes for single fare. Buses and trams share a common fare and ticketing regime, and the DLR, Overground, Underground, and National Rail services another.

=== Zonal fare system ===
Rail service fares in the capital are calculated by a zonal fare system. London is divided into eleven fare zones, with every station on the London Underground, London Overground, Docklands Light Railway and, since 2007, on National Rail services, being in one, or in some cases, two zones. The zones are mostly concentric rings of increasing size emanating from the centre of London. They are (in order):

- Zone 1
- Zone 2
- Zone 3
- Zone 4
- Zone 5
- Zone 6
- Zones 7–9, C, G and W

=== Travelcard ===
Superimposed on these mode-specific regimes is the Travelcard system, which provides zonal tickets with validities from one day to one year, and off-peak variants. These are accepted on the DLR, buses, railways, trams, and the Underground, and provide a discount on many river services fares.

=== Oyster card ===
Oyster card

The Oyster card is a contactless smart card system introduced for the public in 2003, which can be used to pay individual fares (pay as you go) or to carry various Travelcards and other passes. It is used by scanning the card at a yellow card reader. Such readers are found on ticket gates where otherwise a paper ticket could be fed through, allowing the gate to open and the passenger to walk through, and on stand-alone Oyster validators, which do not operate a barrier. Since 2010, Oyster Pay as you go has been available on all National Rail services within London. Oyster Pay as you go has a set of daily maximum charges based on the zones used in the day.

=== Contactless payments ===
In addition to Oyster card, TfL developed a contactless payment system, codenamed CPAY. TfL was an early innovator and adopter of this technology for public transport, introducing contactless payment on buses in 2012 and the rest of the network by September 2014.

Almost all contactless Visa, Maestro, MasterCard and American Express debit and credit cards issued in the UK, and also most international cards supporting contactless payment, are accepted for travel on London Underground, London Overground, Docklands Light Railway, most National Rail, London Tramlink and Bus services. This works in the same way for the passenger as an Oyster card, including the use of capping and reduced fares compared to paper tickets. The widespread use of contactless payment - around 25 million journeys each week – has meant that TfL is now one of Europe's largest contactless merchants, with one in 10 contactless transactions in the UK taking place on the TfL network.

Mobile payments – such as Apple Pay, Google Pay and Samsung Pay – are also accepted in the same way as contactless payment cards. The fares are the same as those charged on a debit or credit card, including the same daily capping. During 2020, one in five journeys were made using mobile devices instead of using contactless bank cards, and TfL had become the most popular Apple Pay merchant in the UK.

The model has been copied across the world. Several cities, such as New York, Sydney, Brisbane and Boston have licensed the technology from TfL and Cubic.

== Identity and marketing ==
TfL's corporate roundels

Each of the main transport units has its own corporate identity, formed by differently coloured versions of the standard roundel logo and adding appropriate lettering across the horizontal bar. The roundel rendered in blue without any lettering represents TfL as a whole (see Transport for London logo), as well as used in situations where lettering on the roundel is not possible (such as bus receipts, where a logo is a blank roundel with the name "London Buses" to the right). The same range of colours is also used extensively in publicity and on the TfL website.

Transport for London has always mounted advertising campaigns to encourage use of the Underground. For example, in 1999, it commissioned artist Stephen Whatley to paint an interior – 'The Grand Staircase' – which he did on location inside Buckingham Palace. This painting was reproduced on posters and displayed all over the London Underground.

During 2010, TfL commissioned artist Mark Wallinger to assist them in celebrating the 150th anniversary of the Underground, by creating the Labyrinth Project, with one enamel plaque mounted permanently in each of the Tube's 272 stations.

In 2015, in partnership with the London Transport Museum and sponsored by Exterion Media, TfL launched Transported by Design, an 18-month programme of activities. The intention was to showcase the importance of both physical and service design across London's transport network. In October 2015, after two months of public voting, the black cab topped the list of favourite London transport icons, which also included the original Routemaster bus and the Tube map, among others. In 2016, the programme held exhibitions, walks and a festival at Regent Street on 3 July.

=== Typeface ===
The Johnston typeface

Johnston (or Johnston Sans) is typeface designed by and named after Edward Johnston. The typeface was commissioned in 1913 by Frank Pick, then commercial manager of the Underground Electric Railways Company of London (also known as 'The Underground Group'), as part of his plan to strengthen the company's corporate identity. Johnston was originally created for printing (with a planned height of 1 inch or 2.5 cm), but it rapidly became used for the enamel station signs of the Underground system as well.

Johnston was originally printed using wood type for large signs and metal type for print. Johnston was redesigned in 1979 to produce New Johnston. The new family comes in eight members: Light, Medium, Bold weights with corresponding Italics, Medium Condensed and Bold Condensed. After the typeface was digitised in 1981–82, New Johnston finally became ready for Linotron photo-typesetting machine, and first appeared in London's Underground stations in 1983. It has been the official typeface exclusively used by Transport for London and The Mayor of London ever since, with minor updates to specific letterforms occurring in 1990–1992 and 2008. A new version, known as Johnston 100, was commissioned by Transport for London from Monotype in 2016 to commemorate the 100th anniversary of the introduction of the typeface, and was designed to be closer to the original version of the Johnston typeface.

=== Advertising bans ===
In May 2019, TfL banned advertising from Saudi Arabia, Pakistan and the United Arab Emirates due to their poor human rights records. This brought the number of countries to 11 from which TfL has banned adverts, due to them having the death penalty for homosexuality. Countries previously banned from advertising were Iran, Nigeria, Saudi Arabia, Somalia, Sudan and Yemen.

In 2019, the Mayor of London, Sadiq Khan, introduced restrictions on advertising of unhealthy food and drinks across the TfL network. A study estimated that this led to a 7% reduction in the average weekly household purchase of foods high in fat, salt, and sugar. The largest reductions were seen in the sales of chocolate and sweets. There was no change in purchases of foods not classified as being high in fat, salt, and sugar.

== See also ==
- Articulated buses in London
- Passenger transport executive
- Selective vehicle detection
- Transport in London

Preceded by London Regional Transport	Transport for London; 2000–present	Succeeded by Current
