= Malcolm Bates (transport administrator) =

British industrialist (1934–2009)

Sir Malcolm Rowland Bates
- Bates in 1999
- Born: 23 September 1934; Portsmouth, United Kingdom
- Died: 30 May 2009 (aged 74)
- Occupation: Chairman of London Regional Transport: 1999–2001, 2001-2003

Sir Malcolm Rowland Bates (23 September 1934 - 30 May 2009) was a British industrialist. He served as the chairman of London Regional Transport from 1999 to 2003.

Bates was born in Portsmouth, attended Portsmouth Grammar School, and served in the Royal Air Force from 1956 to 1958. In 1976 he joined General Electric Company, rising up to become the deputy managing director, a position he remained in for twelve years. He led a group of three businessmen in advising the government on the structure of the planned public-private partnership for the London Underground, and replaced Peter Ford as the chairman of London Regional Transport, who had been against the PPP arrangement. He was replaced by Bob Kiley in 2001 who was appointed by Tony Blair to oversee the implementation of the PPP, however following Kiley's firing amid repeated clashes with the Transport Secretary Stephen Byers regarding the PPP arrangement, he was reappointed as chairman, a position he served in until 2003.

Under his second stint as chairman, he passed the £16 billion PPP proposal, with London Underground remaining a public company running the trains while private companies, Metronet and Tube Lines, were responsible for upgrading the railway. He was awarded a knighthood in 1998. He resigned as Chairman of London Regional Transport on 15 July 2003, as the organisation was succeeded by Transport for London. Metronet later collapsed in 2008, costing the UK Government £2 billion, and Tube Lines was bought out in 2010. The National Audit Office found that "there was limited assurance that the price of the three Tube PPPs was reasonable", and following the collapse of Metronet the arrangement was heavily criticised in the press. In 2010, the Transport Select Committee found that the PPP was "flawed" and failed to provide "value for money".

== See also ==
- List of heads of public transport authorities in London
- London Regional Transport
- London Underground
- Bob Kiley
