= Malcolm Bates =

Malcolm Bates may refer to:

- Malcolm Bates, a character in the soap opera Emmerdale played by Tom Adams
- Malcolm Bates (transport administrator), chairman of London Regional Transport from 1999 to 2003
