= 15 Westferry Circus =

Coordinates: 51°30′18.5″N 0°1′32.3″W

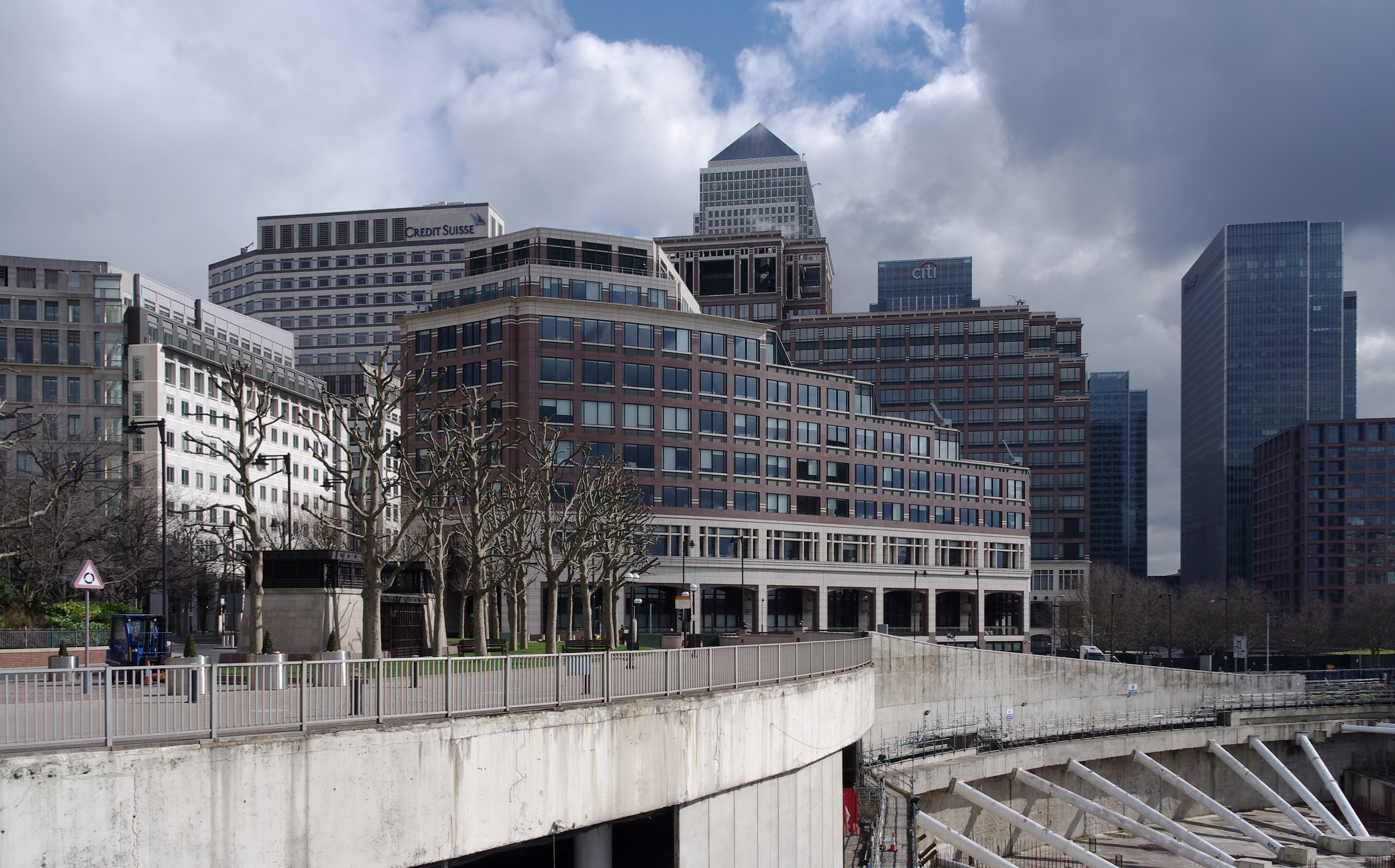
- Interactive map of the 15 Westferry Circus area

General information
- Location: Canary Wharf; London, E14; England
- Construction started: 1998
- Completed: 2001

Height
- Roof: 44.5 m (146 ft)

Technical details
- Floor count: 10
- Floor area: 16,255 m^{2} (174,970 sq ft)

Design and construction
- Architect: Terry Farrell & Partners
- Main contractor: Canary Wharf Contractors

15 Westferry Circus is a 16,250 m^{2} (174,900 sq ft) building located on the upper level of Westferry Circus, Canary Wharf. Construction began in November 1998. Its finish marked the completion of the Westferry Complex, the westernmost point of Canary Wharf financial estate.

The building was designed to fully incorporate the requirements of the tenant, Morgan Stanley Dean Witter, who also occupied the adjoining building. Their lease began in March 2000, the same month Citigroup leased 25 Canada Square.

Morgan Stanley Dean Witter sublet the building to Tube Lines. They share the building leading to the video wall, built for use in stock trading but used as a Recovery Silver Control for the London Underground in the aftermath of the 7 July 2005 London bombings. In 2013 Morgan Stanley vacated the building and it was taken over by London Underground, who had taken over Tube Lines. London Underground vacated the building in 2017.

15 Westferry Circus serves as the fifteen miles (24 km) marker in the London Marathon.

The ownership of this building was the subject of a protracted legal dispute in Ireland in 2012.

As of 2018, Morgan Stanley is once again occupying two floors of the building, with another floor sublet to a tenant.
