= 11 Westferry Circus =

Coordinates: 51.5060°N 0.0254°W

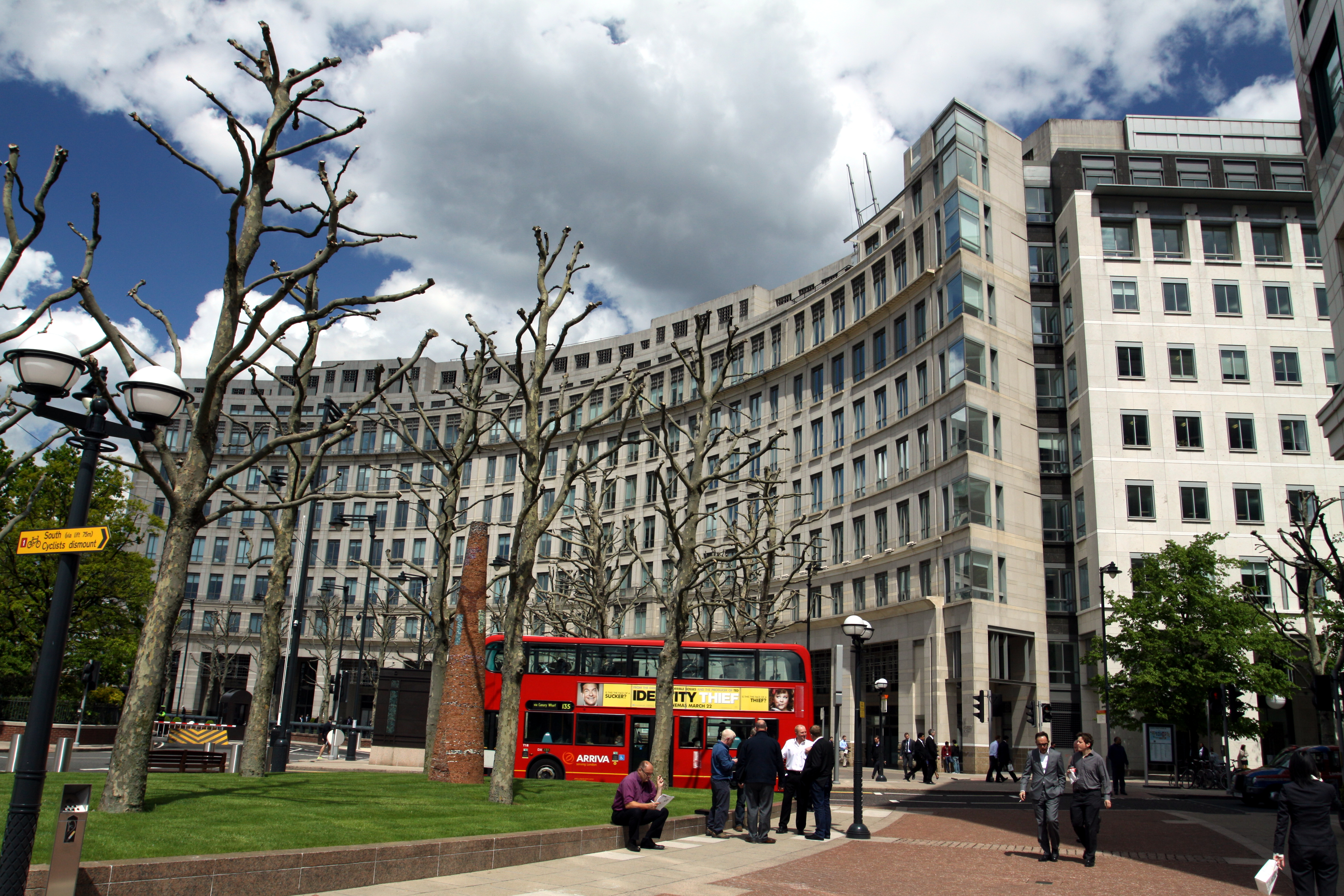

General information
- Status: Completed
- Completed: 1997

Technical details
- Floor count: 11
- Lifts/elevators: 4

11 Westferry Circus is an office building located on the upper level of Westferry Circus in Canary Wharf in London, United Kingdom. Reader's Digest owned and occupied the building until 1999, when the company sold the building and leased space in it from the new owner. The building was designed by a consortium of architectural firms.
