= History of the London Underground =

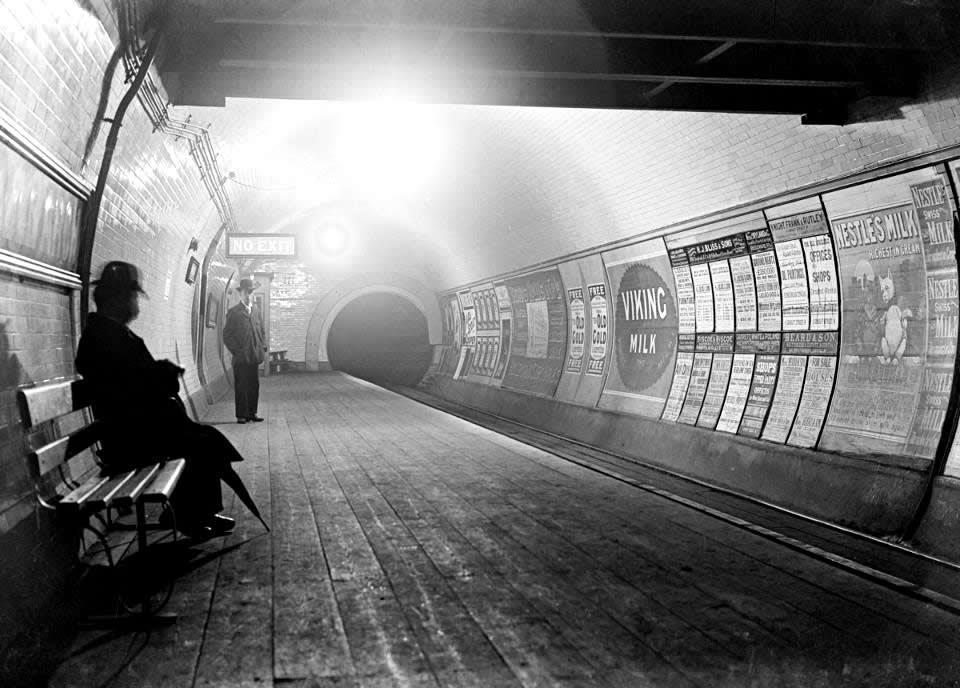
Marble Arch tube station, c. 1900

The history of the London Underground began in the 19th century with the construction of the Metropolitan Railway, the world's first underground railway. The Metropolitan Railway, which opened in 1863 using gas-lit wooden carriages hauled by steam locomotives, worked with the District Railway to complete London's Circle line in 1884. Both railways expanded, the Metropolitan eventually extending as far as Verney Junction in Buckinghamshire, more than 50 miles (80 km) from Baker Street and the centre of London. The first deep-level tube line, the City and South London Railway, opened in 1890 with electric trains. This was followed by the Waterloo & City Railway in 1898, the Central London Railway in 1900, and the Great Northern and City Railway in 1904. The Underground Electric Railways Company of London (UERL) was established in 1902 to fund the electrification of the District Railway and to complete and operate three tube lines, the Baker Street and Waterloo Railway, the Charing Cross, Euston and Hampstead Railway and the Great Northern, Piccadilly and Brompton Railway, which closed during 1906–1907. By 1907, the District and Metropolitan Railways had electrified the underground sections of their lines.

Under a joint marketing agreement between most of the companies in the early years of the 20th century, "UNDERGROUND" signs appeared outside stations in central London. The First World War delayed extensions of the Bakerloo and Central London Railways, and people used the tube stations as shelters during Zeppelin air raids by June 1915. After the war, government-backed financial guarantees were used to expand the network, and the tunnels of the City and South London and Charing Cross, Euston and Hampstead Railways were linked at Euston and Kennington, although the combined service was not named the Northern line until later. The Piccadilly line was extended north to Cockfosters and took over District line branches to Harrow (later Uxbridge) and Hounslow. In 1933, the underground railways and all London area tram and bus operators were merged into the London Passenger Transport Board (LPTB). The outlying branches of the Metropolitan were closed; various upgrades were planned. The Bakerloo line's extension to take over the Metropolitan's Stanmore branch, and extensions of the Central and Northern lines, formed part of the 1930s New Works Programme. The outbreak of the Second World War in 1939 interrupted some of this work; many tube stations were used as air raid shelters during the conflict.

The LPTB was nationalised during 1948, and the reconstruction of the mainline railways was given priority over the maintenance of the Underground. In 1953, an unpainted aluminium train entered service on the District line, and this became the standard for new trains. In the early 1960s, the Metropolitan line was electrified as far as Amersham, and steam locomotives no longer hauled passenger trains. The Victoria line, a new tube line across central London, opened in 1968–71 with trains driven automatically. In 1976, the isolated Northern City Line was taken over by British Rail and linked up with the mainline railway at Finsbury Park. In 1979, another new route, the Jubilee line, took over part of the Bakerloo line; it was extended through the Docklands to Stratford in 1999.

Under the control of the Greater London Council, London Transport introduced in 1981 a system of fare zones for buses and underground trains that cut the average fare. Fares increased following a legal challenge but the fare zones were retained, and during the mid-1980s the Travelcard and the Capitalcard were introduced. In the early years of the 21st century, London Underground was reorganised in a public–private partnership where private companies upgraded and maintained the infrastructure. In 2003, control passed to Transport for London (TfL), which had been opposed to the arrangement and, following financial failure of the infrastructure companies, had taken full responsibility by 2010. The contactless Oyster card first went on sale in 2003. The East London line closed during 2007 to be converted into a London Overground line, and in December 2009 the Circle line changed from serving a closed loop around the centre of London to a spiral also serving Hammersmith. Currently there is an upgrade programme to increase capacity on several Underground lines, and work concluded in 2021 on a Northern line extension to Battersea.

== The first underground railways (1863–1905) ==
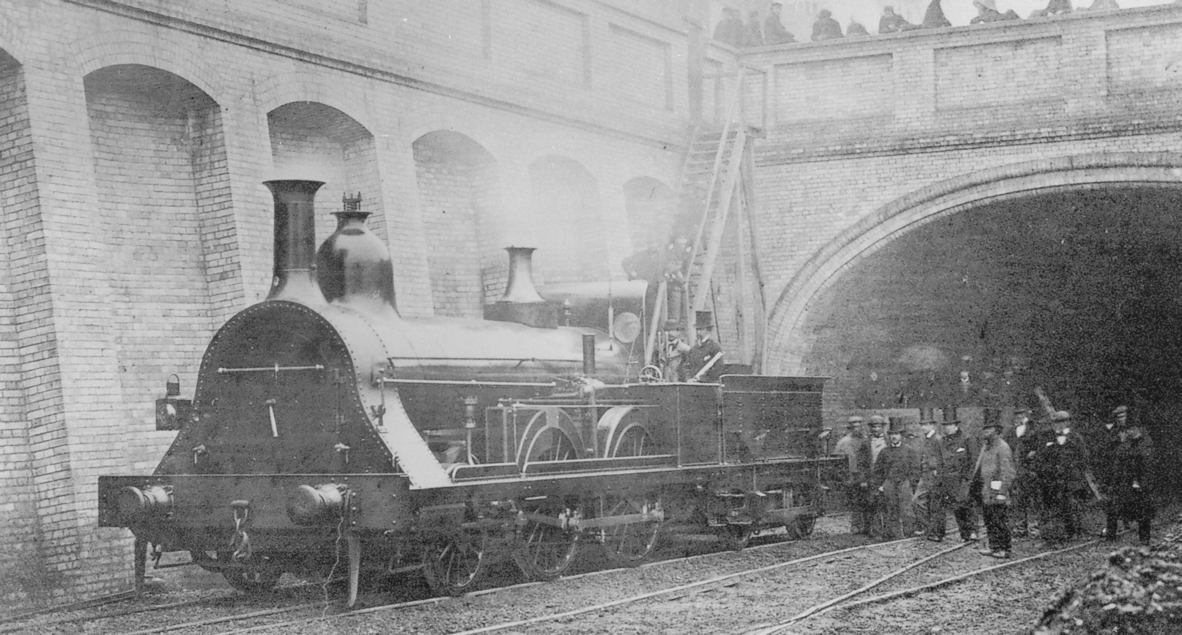
Fowler's Ghost was an experimental fireless steam locomotive designed by John Fowler to prevent smoke and steam underground. It was not considered a success, and condensing steam locomotives were used.

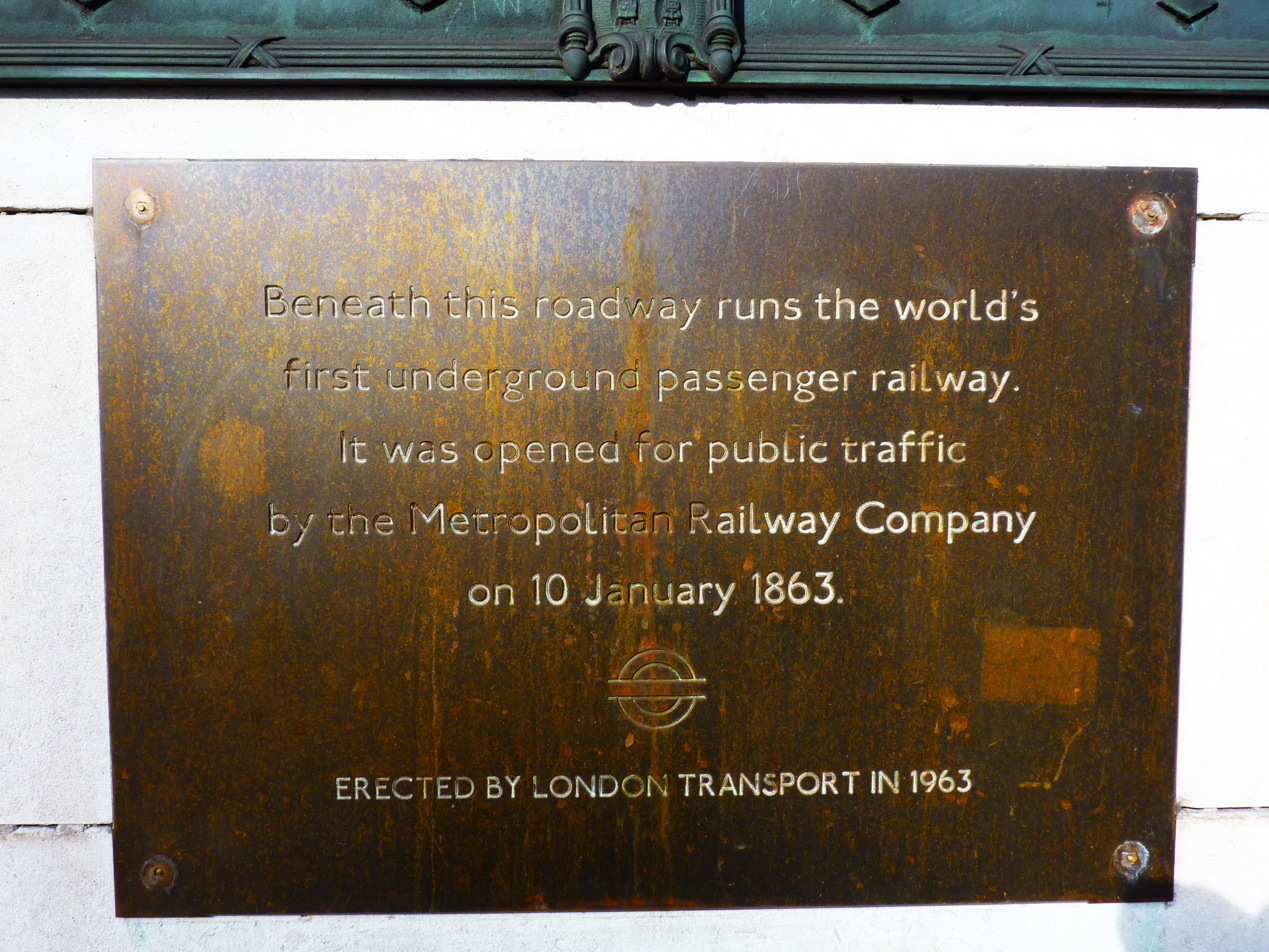
Sign on wall beside Marylebone Road beyond station entrance

During the first half of the 19th century, London had grown greatly and the development of a commuting population arriving by train each day led to traffic congestion with carts, cabs and omnibuses filling the roads. By 1850, there were seven railway termini located around the urban centre of London and the concept of an underground railway linking the City of London with these stations was first proposed in the 1830s. Charles Pearson, Solicitor to the City of London, was a leading promoter of several schemes, and he contributed to the creation of the City Terminus Company to build such a railway from Farringdon to King's Cross in 1852. Although the plan was supported by the City of London, the railway companies were not interested and the company struggled to proceed. During 1854, the Metropolitan Railway (also known as the Met) was granted permission to build an underground line at an estimated cost of £1 million. With the Crimean War under way, the Met found it hard to raise the capital, and construction did not start until March 1860. The railway was mostly built using the "cut-and-cover" method from Paddington to King's Cross; east of King's Cross it was built by tunnelling and then followed the culverted River Fleet in an open cutting to the new meat market at Smithfield. The 3.75-mile (6 km) railway opened to the public on 10 January 1863, using steam locomotives hauling wooden carriages. It was hailed as a success, carrying 38,000 passengers on the opening day, borrowing trains from other railways to supplement the service. In the first twelve months 9.5 million passengers were carried and in the second twelve months this increased to 12 million.

The Met's early success prompted a flurry of applications to Parliament during 1863 for various new railways in London, many competing for similar routes. The House of Lords established a select committee that recommended an "inner circuit of railway that should abut, if not actually join, nearly all of the principal railway termini in the Metropolis". Proposals to extend the Met were accepted, and the committee agreed a proposal that a new company, the Metropolitan District Railway (commonly known as the District Railway), be formed to complete the circuit. Initially, the District and the Met were closely associated and it was intended that they would merge. The Met's chairman and three other directors were on the board of the District, John Fowler was the engineer of both companies. The construction works for the extensions were let as a single contract and the Met initially operated all the services. Struggling under the burden of high construction costs, the District's level of debt meant that merger was no longer attractive to the Met and its directors resigned from the District's board. To improve its finances, the District terminated the operating agreement and began operating its own trains. Conflict between the Met and the District and the expense of construction delayed further progress on the completion of the inner circle. By 1879, the Met was seeking to access the South Eastern Railway via the East London Railway (ELR); an Act of Parliament was obtained to complete the circle and link to the ELR. After an official opening ceremony on 17 September and trial running, a complete Circle line service started on 6 October 1884.

The Metropolitan Railway had been extended soon after opening, reaching Hammersmith with the Great Western Railway in 1864 and Richmond over the tracks of the London and South Western Railway (L&SWR) in 1877. The Metropolitan & St John's Wood Railway opened as a single track branch from Baker Street to Swiss Cottage, and this was to become the Met's most important route as it expanded north into the Middlesex countryside, where it stimulated the development of new suburbs. Harrow was reached during 1880, and the line eventually extended as far as Verney Junction in Buckinghamshire, more than 50 miles (80 kilometres) from Baker Street and the centre of London. From the end of the 19th century, the railway shared tracks with the Great Central Railway route out of Marylebone.

By 1871, when the District began operating its own trains, the railway had extended to West Brompton and a terminus at Mansion House. Hammersmith was reached from Earl's Court and services reached Richmond, Ealing, Hounslow and Wimbledon. As part of the project that completed the Circle line in October 1884, the District began to serve Whitechapel. As a result of the expansion, by 1898, 550 trains operated daily. Services began running to Upminster in 1902, after a link to the London, Tilbury & Southend Railway had been built.

=== First terrorist attack ===
Harry Pitts (27 June 1861 – 30 April 1897) was the first person to be killed by a terrorist attack on the London Underground. Pitts died of injuries received from a bomb which exploded at Aldersgate Station (now Barbican) on 26 April 1897. The bomb was planted by Russian anarchists in revenge for one of their members being given a seven-year prison sentence. At an inquest into Pitts death a verdict of "wilful murder against person or persons unknown" was recorded. Pitts was born in Bradninch, Devon the son of a millwright. He briefly spent some time in Lancashire before settling in Tottenham, North London. He was married and had two daughters.

== Electric underground railways (1900–1908) ==
=== Deep-level tubes ===
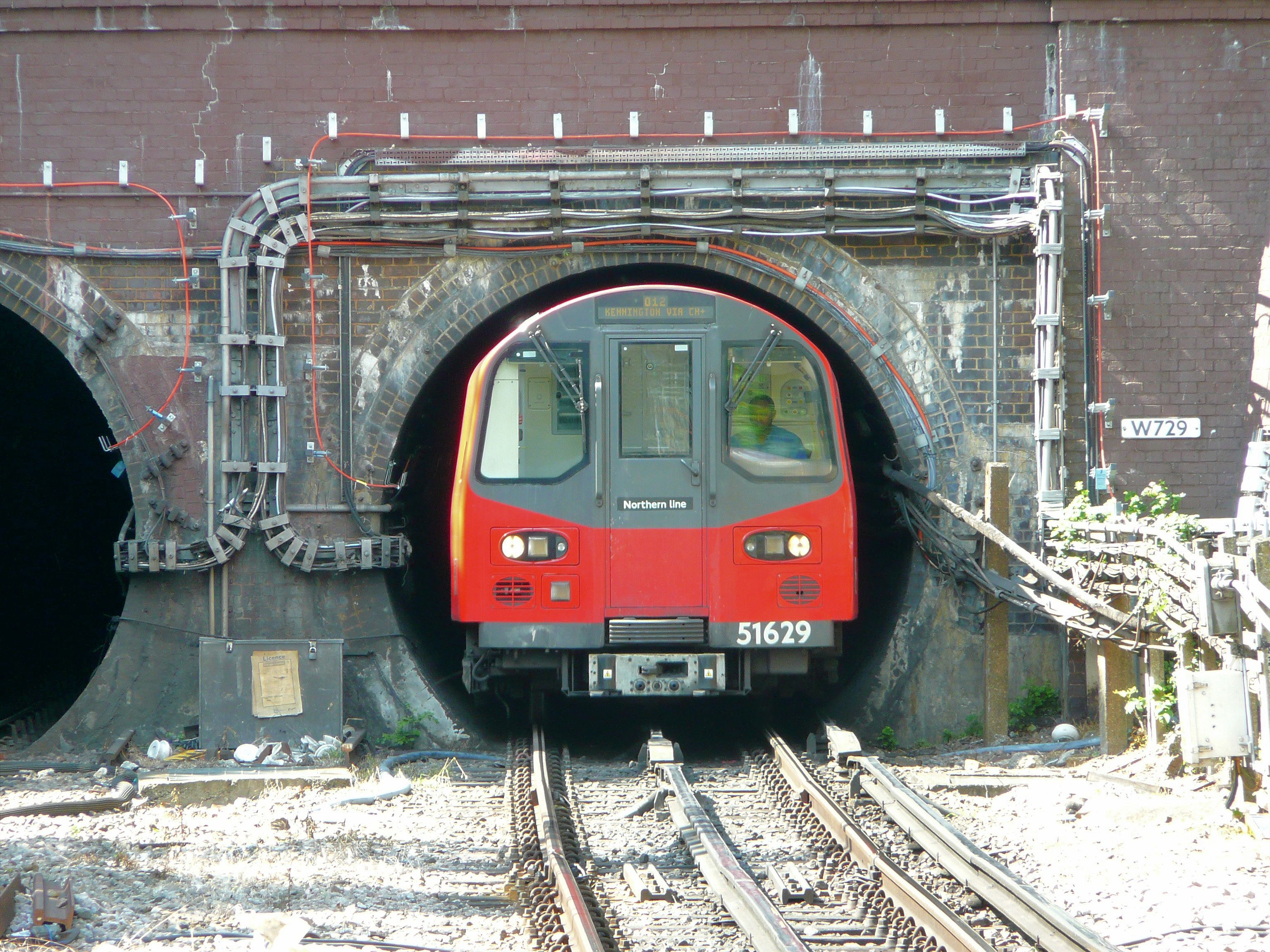
The Central line opened as the "Twopenny tube" in 1900. A Northern line train leaves a tunnel mouth just north of Hendon Central station.

During 1869, a passage was dug through the London Clay under the Thames from Great Tower Hill to Pickle Herring Stairs near Vine Street (now Vine Lane). A circular 7-foot-diameter (2.1 m) tunnel was dug 1,340 feet (410 m), using a wrought iron shield, a method that had been patented in 1864 by Peter William Barlow. A railway was laid in the tunnel and from August 1870 a wooden carriage conveyed passengers from one side to the other. This was uneconomic and the company went bankrupt by the end of the year and the tunnel was converted to pedestrian use, becoming known as the Tower Subway. Construction of the City and South London Railway (C&SLR) was started in 1886 by James Henry Greathead using a development of Barlow's shield. Two 10-foot-2-inch (3.10 m) circular tunnels were dug between King William Street (close to today's Monument station) and Elephant and Castle. From Elephant and Castle, the tunnels were a slightly larger 10 feet 6 inches (3.20 m) to Stockwell. This was a legacy of the original intention to haul the trains by cable. The tunnels were bored under the roads to avoid the need for agreement with owners of property on the surface. The original intention to cable-haul the trains changed to electric power when the cable company went bankrupt. A conductor rail energised with +500 volts DC conductor rail for the northbound tunnel and −500 volts for the southbound laid between the running rails, though offset from the centreline, powered the electric locomotives that hauled the carriages. The carriages were fitted with small windows and consequently were nicknamed padded cells. By 1907, the C&SLR had extended from both ends, south to Clapham Common and north to Euston.

In 1898, the Waterloo & City Railway was opened between London & South Western Railway's terminus at Waterloo station and a station in the City. Operated by the L&SWR, the short electrified line used four-car electric multiple units. Two 11 feet 8 1/4 inches (3.562 m) diameter tunnels were dug beneath the roads between Shepherd's Bush and Bank for the Central London Railway (CLR). In 1900 this opened, charging a flat fare of 2d (approximately 89p today), becoming known as the "Twopenny tube" and by the end of the year carrying nearly 15 million passengers. Initially electric locomotives hauled carriages, but the heavy locomotives caused vibrations that could be felt on the surface. During 1902–1903, the carriages were reformed into multiple units using a control system developed by Frank Sprague in Chicago. The CLR was extended to Wood Lane (near White City) in 1908 and Liverpool Street in 1912. The Great Northern & City Railway was built to take main line trains from the Great Northern Railway (GNR) at Finsbury Park to the City at a terminus at Moorgate. However, the GNR refused permission for trains to use its Finsbury Park station, so platforms were built beneath the station instead and public service on the line, using electric multiple units, began in 1904.

=== District and Metropolitan electrification ===
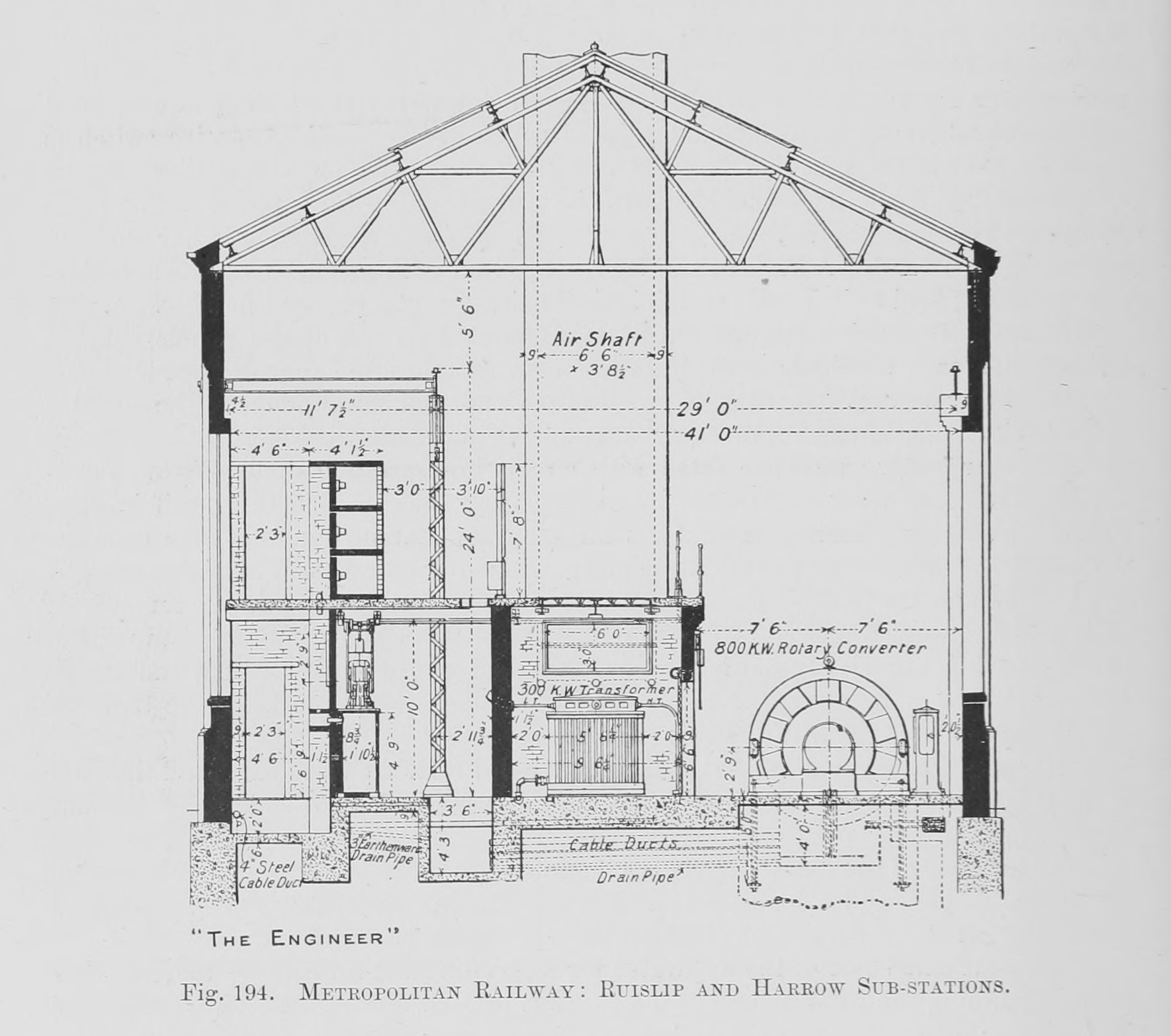
Electrification – 1907 drawing of Metropolitan Railway – Ruislip and Harrow sub-stations

On the District and Metropolitan Railways, the use of steam locomotives led to smoke-filled stations and carriages that were unpopular with passengers and electrification was seen as the way forward. Electric traction was still in its infancy and agreement would be needed between the two companies because of the shared ownership of the inner circle. A tender was announced for an electric system, and the largest European and American companies applied to win the contract. When the experts of the London Metro compared the design of the Ganz Works to the offers of the other large European and American competitors, however, they found that the newest type of AC traction technology of the Ganz Works was more reliable and cheaper, and considered its technology as a "revolution in electric railway traction". During 1901, a Metropolitan and District joint committee recommended the Ganz three-phase AC system with overhead wires. Initially this was accepted by both parties, until the District found an investor, the American Charles Yerkes, to finance the upgrade. Yerkes raised £1 million (adjusted for inflation, £106 million) and soon had control of the District Railway. His experiences in the United States led him to favour the classic traditional DC system similar to that in use on the City & South London Railway and Central London Railway. The Metropolitan Railway protested about the change of plan, but after arbitration by the Board of Trade the DC system was adopted.

The Metropolitan electrified its new line from Harrow to Uxbridge and the route to the inner circle at Baker Street, using separate positive and negative conductor rails energised at 550–600 V. The District electrified its unopened line from Mill Hill Park (now Acton Town) to South Harrow and used this line to test its new trains and to train drivers. Electric multiple units began running on the Metropolitan in January 1905 and by March all local services between Baker Street and Harrow were electric. Electric services began on the District Railway in June 1905 between Hounslow and South Acton. In July 1905, the District began running electric trains from Ealing to Whitechapel and on the same day the Met and the District both introduced electric units on the inner circle until later that day an incompatibility was found between the way the shoe-gear was mounted on the Met trains and the District track. The Met trains were withdrawn from the District lines and modified, full electric service starting on the circle line in September. In the same month, after withdrawing services over the un-electrified East London Railway and east of East Ham, the District were running electric services on all remaining routes. The GWR electrified the line between Paddington and Hammersmith and the branch from Latimer Road to Kensington (Addison Road). An electric service with jointly owned rolling stock started on the route in November 1906. During the same year, the Met suspended running on the East London Railway, terminating instead at the District's station at Whitechapel. The Metropolitan Railway beyond Harrow was not electrified so services were hauled by an electric locomotive from Baker Street and changed for a steam locomotive en route.

== Integration (1902–1933) ==
=== Underground Electric Railways Company of London ===
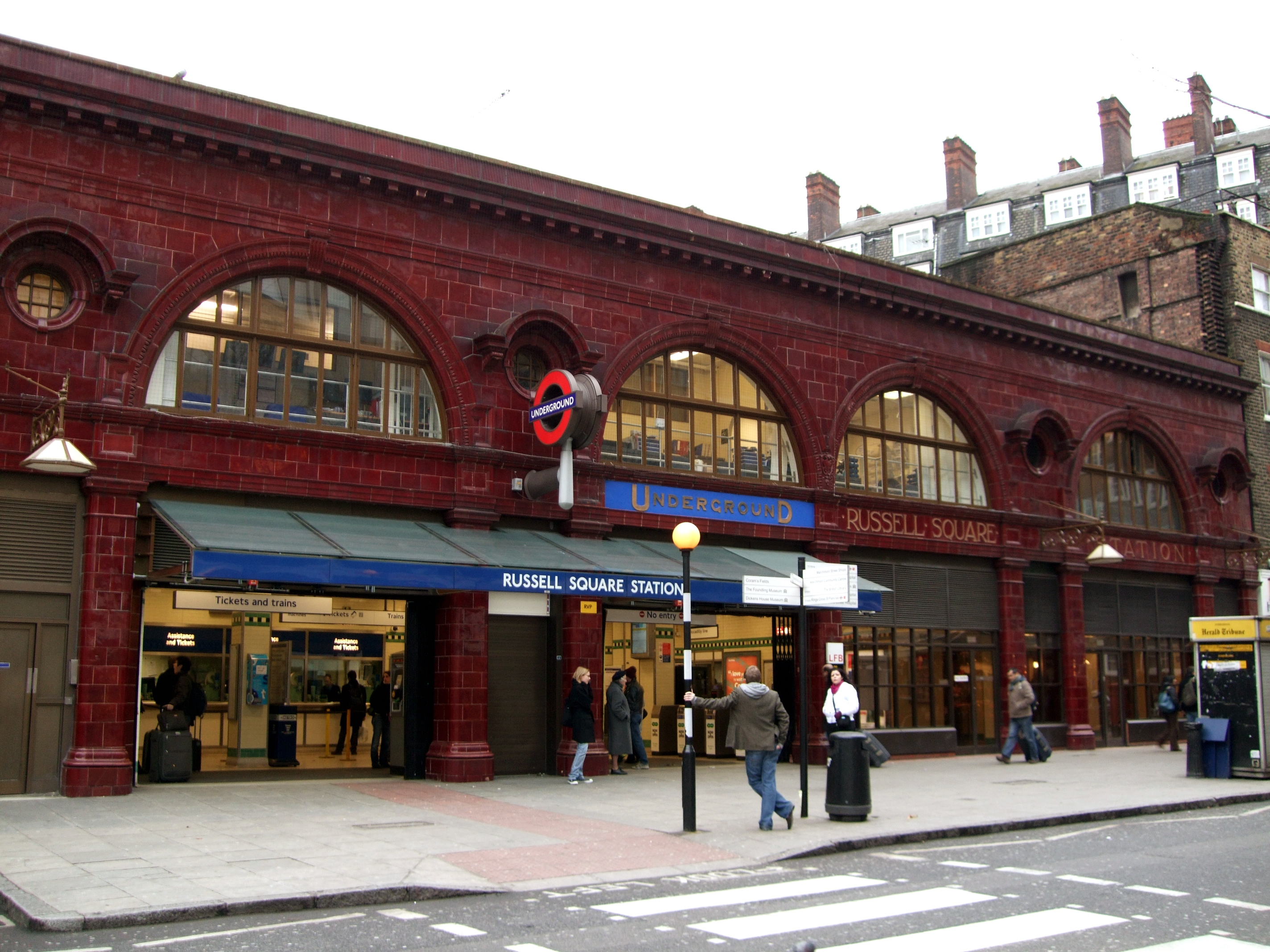
Russell Square station, an example of the Leslie Green design used for the UERL's stations

The Charing Cross, Euston and Hampstead Railway, was authorised from Charing Cross to Hampstead and Highgate in 1893, but had not found financial backing. Yerkes bought the rights in 1900, and obtained additional approval for a branch from Camden Town to Golders Green. The Baker Street and Waterloo Railway had been authorised to run from Baker Street to Waterloo station. Work began in 1898, and extensions to Paddington station and Elephant & Castle were authorised in 1900, but came to a halt with the collapse of their financial backers during 1901. Yerkes bought the rights to this railway in 1902. The District had permission for a deep-level tube from Earl's Court to Mansion House and in 1898 had bought the Brompton and Piccadilly Circus Railway that had authority for a tube from South Kensington to Piccadilly Circus. The District's plans were combined by Yerkes with those of the Great Northern and Strand Railway, a tube railway with permission to build a line from Strand to Finsbury Park, to create the Great Northern, Piccadilly and Brompton Railway. In April 1902, the Underground Electric Railways Company of London (UERL) was established, with Yerkes as chairman, to control these companies and manage the planned works.

On 8 June 1902, the UERL took over the Metropolitan District Traction Company. The UERL built a large power station that would be capable of providing power for the District and underground lines under construction. Work began in 1902 at Lots Road, by Chelsea Creek, and in February 1905 Lots Road Power Station began generating electricity. For the three lines similar electric multiple units were purchased, known as "Gate Stock" as access to the cars was via lattice gates at each end operated by gatemen. As on the District Railway the track was provided with separate positive and negative conductor rails, in what was to become a London Underground standard. A number of the surface buildings, with an exterior of glazed dark red bricks, were designed by Leslie Green and 140 electric lifts were imported from America from the Otis Elevator Company. A length of the Baker Street & Waterloo between Baker Street and Kennington Road (now Lambeth North) opened in March 1906, and the line reached Edgware Road the following year. It was named the 'Bakerloo' in July 1906, called an undignified "gutter title" by The Railway Magazine. The Great Northern, Piccadilly & Brompton Railway (the Piccadilly) opened from Finsbury Park to Hammersmith in December 1906, the Aldwych branch opening the following year. "Moving staircases" or escalators were first installed at Earl's Court between the District and Piccadilly line platforms, and at all deep level tube stations after 1912. The last, the Charing Cross, Euston & Hampstead (the Hampstead) opened in 1907, and ran from Charing Cross to Camden Town, before splitting into two branches going to Golders Green and Highgate (now Archway).

=== London Underground ===
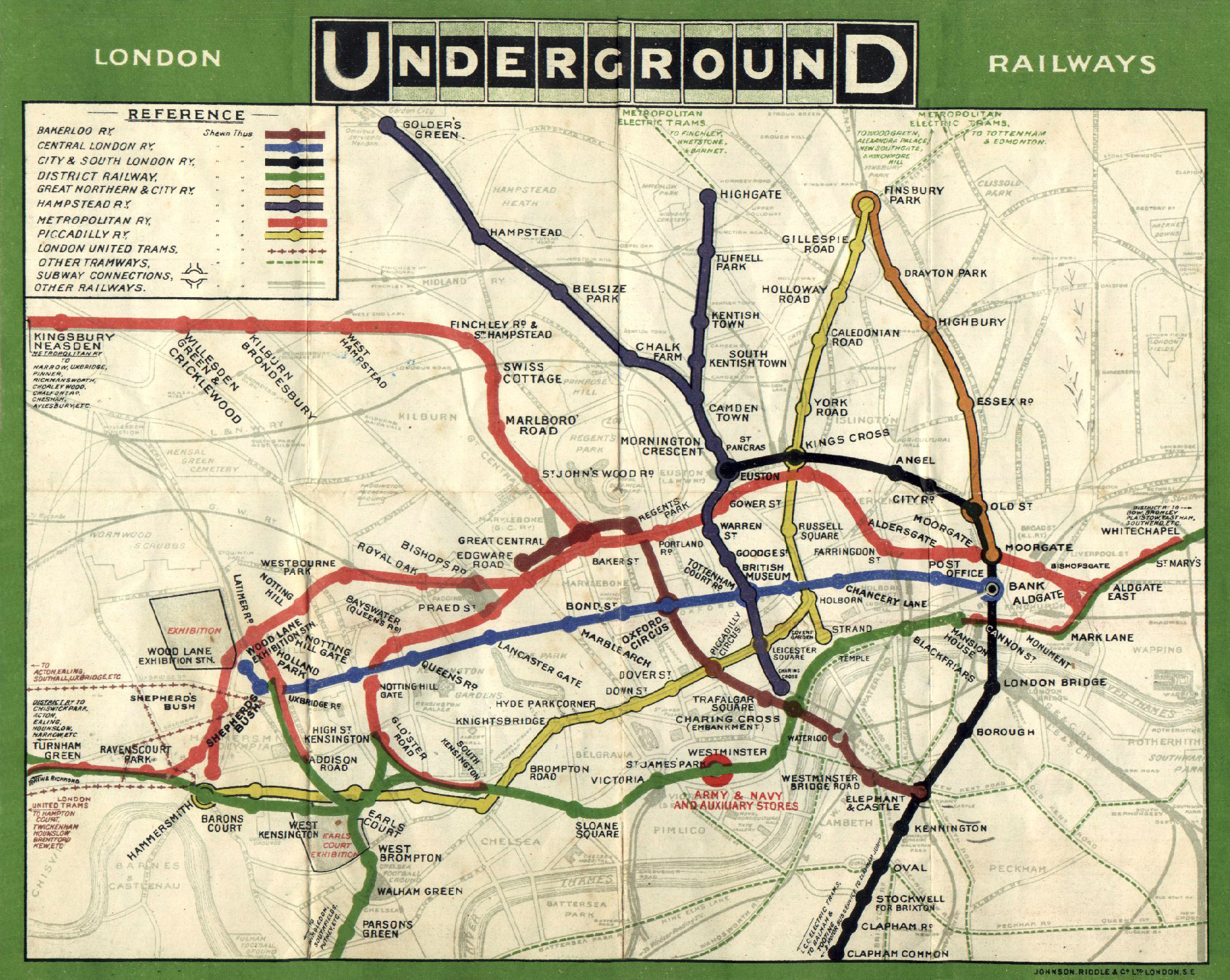
The joint map published in 1908.

To promote travel by the underground railways in London, a joint marketing arrangement was agreed that included maps, joint publicity and through ticketing. UNDERGROUND signs were used outside stations in Central London. The UERL acquired London bus and tram companies in 1912 and the following year the City & South London and Central London Railway joined the company. That year the Great Northern & City was taken over by the Met. Suggestions of merger with the Underground Group were rejected by the Metropolitan, a press release of November 1912 noting its interests in areas outside London, its relationships with main line railways and its freight business. Further coordination in the form of a General Managers' Conference faltered after the Metropolitan withdrew in 1911 when the Central London Railway, without any reference to the conference, set its season ticket prices significantly lower than those on the Met's competing routes. The UERL introduced station name boards with a red disc and a blue bar and the Met responded with station boards showing a blue bar on a red diamond.

During 1913, the Bakerloo line reached Paddington, and the following year the Hampstead line was extended south of its Charing Cross terminus to an expanded interchange station (currently known as Embankment) with the Bakerloo and District lines. The Bakerloo line was extended north to Queen's Park to link up with the London & North Western Railway's new electric line from Euston to Watford Junction. The start of the First World War in July 1914 delayed construction, trains reaching Queen's Park in 1915 and Watford Junction in 1917. An extension of the Central line west to Ealing was started in 1913 and, also delayed by the war, was completed in 1920. The war saw growth in traffic and a shortage of men, so women were recruited as temporary replacements in traditional men's jobs such as guards, clerks, painters and cleaners. London saw its first air raids in 1915, and people used the tube stations as improvised bomb shelters.

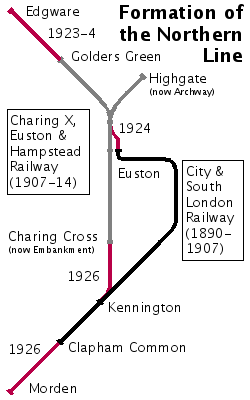
There was major expansion of what was to become the Northern line in the 1920s

After the conflict, new trains were purchased to run on the Metropolitan, District, Bakerloo and Piccadilly lines, the Piccadilly line trains having air-operated sliding doors. In the 1920s, taking advantage of government-backed financial guarantees for capital projects that promoted employment, there were major extensions of the City & South London and the Hampstead lines. The tunnels of the City & South London Railway were rebuilt to have the same diameter as the other tubes, and then extended north from Euston to a junction with the Hampstead line at Camden Town, and south to Morden. The Hampstead line was extended to the north from Golders Green to Edgware and south to another junction with the City & South London at Kennington, opening in 1926. Although physically connected, the lines were still officially named the City Railway and Hampstead & Highgate line. The lines were to be known as the Edgware, Highgate and Morden and the Morden-Edgware until finally renamed the Northern line in 1937. Also during the 1920s, the original tube gate stock was replaced with 1,460 cars of Standard Stock with air-operating sliding doors, except for the Central line, where the cars were refurbished. Busy central London stations were modernised with escalators replacing lifts.

Unlike other railway companies in the London area, the Met was able to develop land for housing. After the First World War, they promoted housing estates near the railway with the "Metro-land" brand and nine housing estates were built near stations on the line. Taking advantage of the Treasury guarantees, electrification was extended north from Harrow to Rickmansworth, and a short branch opened from Rickmansworth to Watford in 1925. During the 1920s, more powerful electric and steam locomotives were purchased, and Metropolitan Railway stations were redesigned by their architect Charles W Clark .

With finance guaranteed by the government, the Piccadilly lines and the Metropolitan were extended in the early 1930s. The Metropolitan opened a line from Wembley Park to Stanmore, and the Piccadilly line was to extend north from Finsbury Park to Cockfosters and west from Hammersmith and took over the District line Harrow and Hounslow branches. Several stations were rebuilt in a Modernist style influenced or designed by Charles Holden, who called them his 'brick boxes with concrete lids'. Piccadilly line trains took over the District service to South Harrow in 1932, reaching Uxbridge the following year. Piccadilly trains reached Cockfosters and Hounslow West in 1933, although District line services to Hounslow continued until 1964.

== London Passenger Transport Board (1933–1947) ==
During 1933, Harry Beck's diagrammatic tube map appeared for the first time. On 1 July 1933, the London Passenger Transport Board (LPTB), was created as a public corporation and the Metropolitan, the UERL underground railways, tramway companies and bus operators were merged into one organisation. On the former Metropolitan Railway, the Brill Branch closed in 1935, followed by the line from Quainton Road to Verney Junction in 1936. It was proposed to electrify to Amersham with additional tracks from Harrow to Rickmansworth and to extend the Bakerloo line to Stanmore to relieve the bottleneck on the Metropolitan from Baker Street to Finchley. Before any work was started on the Met, the 1935–1940 New Works Programme was announced. This included extending the Central line to Stratford and then onto Epping and Ongar and the Northern line was to be extended north to High Barnet, Alexandra Palace and Bushey Heath and link up with the isolated Great Northern & City Railway, renamed the Northern City Line, which was to be extended beyond Finsbury Park to link up at Highgate.

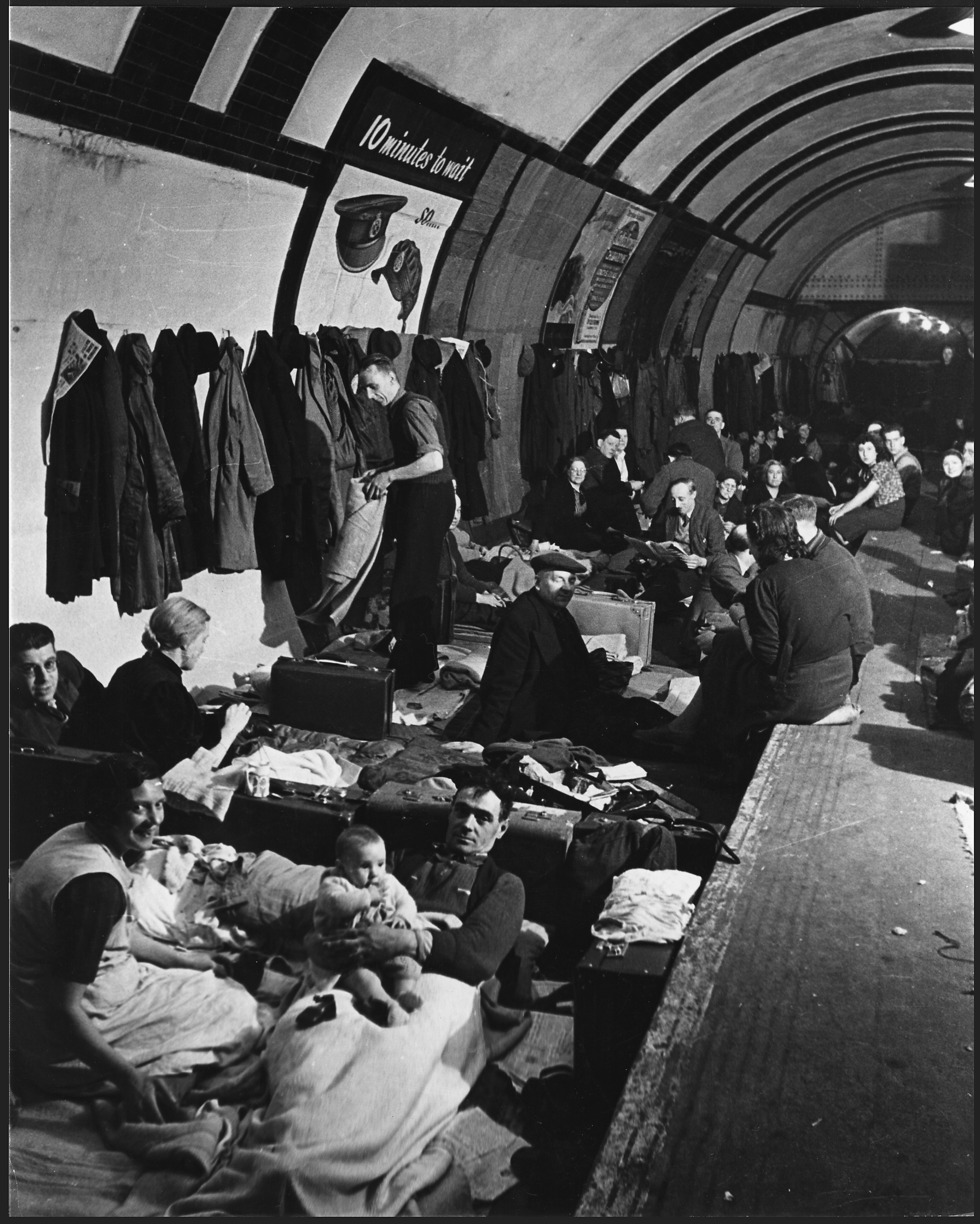
A tube station being used as an air raid shelter

New trains were delivered before the outbreak of the Second World War in September 1939, including 573 cars for the District and Metropolitan lines and 1,121 new cars (1938 Stock) for the tube lines. Following the outbreak of war, services on the Northern line between Strand (now Charing Cross) and Kennington were suspended as the tunnels under the Thames were blocked as a defence against flooding. The Metropolitan Pullman cars were placed into store and first class was removed from London Underground services. The New Works Programme continued, albeit at a reduced pace, the Bakerloo line taking over the Stanmore branch from the Metropolitan in November 1939. The Northern line reached Mill Hill East in May 1941, but by then, work on the other Northern and Central line extensions had been suspended. The bombing of London and especially the Blitz led to the use of many tube stations as air-raid shelters, with 175,000 people arriving every night in August 1940. Six stations were breached by a direct hit, and in March 1943, 173 people died in a crowd crush accident at the unfinished Bethnal Green station. In the 1940s, a depot built for the Northern line extension and an unfinished stretch of the Central line extension, the underground section between Newbury Park and Leytonstone, was turned into an aircraft factory. The closed Brompton Road station was used as an anti-aircraft control room. The closed Down Street station was used by Winston Churchill and the Railway Emergency Committee.

Before the conflict, the Olympia exhibition centre had been served by the Metropolitan line and by a service from Earl's Court to Willesden Junction. Following bombing during 1940, passenger services over the West London Line were suspended. This left the exhibition centre without a railway service so, after the war, the station was renamed Kensington (Olympia) and served by a District line shuttle from Earl's Court. The Central line extensions in east and west London were completed, tube trains running to Epping from 1949.

== Nationalisation (1947–2000) ==
Britain's railways were nationalised on 1 January 1948, and London Transport placed under the authority of the British Transport Commission (BTC). The BTC prioritised the reconstruction of the main line railways over the maintenance of the Underground and most of the unfinished plans of the 1935–40 New Works Programme were shelved or postponed. For the tube lines, new cars (1949 Stock) were built to run with the 1938 stock. Some of the cars on the District line were in need of replacement, and in 1953 an unpainted aluminium train (R Stock) entered service, and this became the standard for new trains, and was followed by 1959 tube stock. After experiments with an AEC lightweight diesel multiple unit in 1952, steam trains were removed from the Central line following the electrification of the Epping–Ongar section during 1957.

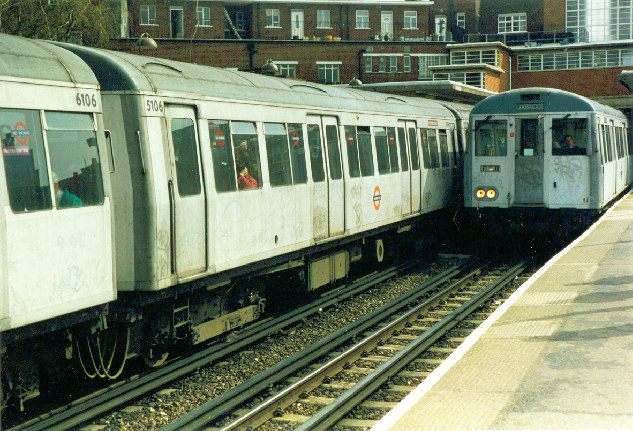
In the early 1960s the unpainted aluminium A Stock took over Metropolitan line services from Baker Street to Uxbridge, Watford and Amersham

Between 1963 and 1970, London Transport reported directly to the Minister of Transport, before control passed to the Greater London Council. Electrification work on the Metropolitan line, suspended due to the war, had restarted in 1959. The line was electrified to Amersham and the unpainted aluminium (A Stock) replaced steam trains, British Rail providing services for the former Metropolitan line stations between Amersham and Aylesbury.

=== Victoria line and Jubilee line ===
The Victoria line was recommended in a 1949 report as it would reduce congestion on other lines. After some experimental tunnelling during 1959, construction began in 1963 and, unlike the earlier tubes, the tunnels did not have to follow the roads above. The line was originally approved to run from Walthamstow to Victoria station, the extension to Brixton being authorised later. As part of the works, Oxford Circus station was rebuilt to allow interchange with the Central and Bakerloo lines. Cross platform interchanges were built at Euston, Highbury & Islington and Finsbury Park. After running trains from Walthamstow, first to Finsbury Park and then to Warren Street in 1968, the line to Victoria was officially opened in March 1969. The extension to Brixton opened in 1971. Designed for automatic train operation, access to the platforms was by using magnetically encoded tickets collected by automatic gates.

The Moorgate tube crash occurred on 28 February 1975 on the isolated Northern City Line when a southbound train failed to stop at the Moorgate terminus and crashed into the wall at end of the tunnel, killing forty-two people, with one more dying in hospital, bringing the death toll to forty-three. No fault was found with the train equipment, the subsequent report found that there was insufficient evidence to determine the cause. Following the incident, a system that stops a train automatically if the driver fails to brake was introduced at dead-ends on the London Underground. The Northern City Line was connected to British Rail tracks at Finsbury Park in the 1970s. The last tube train ran in October 1975, and British Rail services began in 1976. During 1977, the Piccadilly line was extended from Hounslow to Heathrow Airport, and in 1986 a platform serving Terminal 4 opened on a loop line.

The Fleet line through central London was first proposed during 1965, taking over the Bakerloo line's Stanmore branch at Baker Street and then running via Fleet Street to Lewisham. To simplify planning the construction was divided into stages, and the first stage from Baker Street to Charing Cross had all the necessary approvals by 1971. Work began the following year and tunnelling had been completed in 1976. After the line had been renamed the Jubilee line in honour of Queen Elizabeth's Silver Jubilee in 1977, it opened in April 1979 using trains that had been running on the Bakerloo line.

=== 1980s ===
In 1981, the Greater London Council (GLC) introduced the 'Fares Fair' scheme, a system of fare zones for bus and underground trains, cutting the average fare by 32 per cent. The GLC lost a legal challenge over this scheme, which led to fares being doubled during 1982. The fare zones were retained and fares dropped slightly the following year. During 1983, the Travelcard allowed travel within the specified zones on buses and underground trains, and was followed by the Capitalcard in 1985 that included British Rail services. In 1984, control of London Buses and the London Underground passed to London Regional Transport (LRT), which reported directly to Secretary of State for Transport.

By the early 1980s, the pre-war trains had been replaced by new unpainted aluminium trains. One person operation had been planned in 1968, but conflict with the trade unions delayed introduction. The Metropolitan, East London, District and Circle lines were converted during 1985–1986, the Piccadilly, Jubilee and Bakerloo lines following in 1987–1988. One Person Operation was introduced on the Central and Northern lines after they received new trains in the early 1990s.

==== King's Cross fire ====
On 18 November 1987, the King's Cross fire, caused by a carelessly discarded lit match that set fire to a wooden escalator, killed 31 people. In the subsequent report, London Underground was strongly criticised for its attitude to fires and its publication led to resignations of senior management in both London Underground and London Regional Transport and to the introduction of new fire safety regulations. A Fire Safety Code of Practice was drawn up for rolling stock and this led to internal refurbishment of the trains that included replacing the interior panelling and fitting or improving the public address systems.

=== 1990s ===
At the same time, the exterior of the trains were painted as it had proved difficult to remove graffiti from unpainted aluminium. The first refurbished trains were presented to the media in September 1989, and the project was launched during July 1991. In 1994, LRT took over control of the Waterloo and City line. The Epping–Ongar branch of the Central line and the Aldwych branch of the Piccadilly line closed in the same year. To link the growing Docklands area with central London, several options were considered, and an extension of the Jubilee line was chosen. Approved during 1993, the stations were built to be fully accessible and with platform edge doors. There was pressure on London Transport to get the line open in time for the opening of the Millennium Dome on 1 January 2000 and the extension opened in stages from Stratford, with through running from 22 November 1999, when the Charing Cross terminus closed.

== Transport for London (from 2000) ==
Transport for London (TfL) was created during 2000 as part of the Greater London Authority by the Greater London Authority Act 1999. TfL eventually replaced London Regional Transport, and discontinued the use of the London Transport brand in favour of its own brand. The transfer of responsibility was staged, with transfer of control of London Underground delayed until July 2003, when London Underground Limited became an indirect subsidiary of TfL.

=== Public–private partnership ===
During the mid 1990s, the Conservative government conducted a deep exploration of various options for involving the private sector in the operations of the London Underground. These options included its complete privatisation, akin to that of British Rail. This option was publicly opposed by the Labour Party, who stated in their New Labour, New Life for Britain manifesto for the upcoming general election that the wholesale privatisation of the Underground was not the answer and proposed the use of a public-private partnership (PPP) arrangement instead.

Following the election, the new Labour government promptly began work on setting up PPPs, stating that this would address the perceived period of underinvestment in the Underground. The selected model called for the operation of services on the Tube to remain in the hands of the public sector while the infrastructure (including the track, trains, tunnels, signals, and stations) would be leased to private firms for a 30 year period, during which they would enact various improvements. A public denial that the newly-formed railway infrastructure company Railtrack would be involved in the PPP was issued by the government after it was made clear that some parties would refuse to bid if it was. By the turn of the century, senior figures within the government was strongly advocating for the implementation of these PPPs.

=== Formation of the PPP ===
During 1999, prior to control being passed to TfL, London Underground was split up so that a public–private partnership (PPP) arrangement could be put in place, under which London Underground remained a public company that ran the trains while private companies were responsible for upgrading the infrastructure, such as the lines, signals, and other systems.

The bidding process was protracted by political factors, including public disagreements on the topic of PPPs between then-Mayor of London Ken Livingstone and Deputy Prime Minister John Prescott. Furthermore, in the aftermath of the Hatfield rail crash, there was a climate of both public and political skepticism in the involvement of the private sector in transport infrastructure. Livingstone was skeptical about the practicality of the PPP plan, and brought in the American Bob Kiley as the first commissioner of TfL to repeat his success with the New York City Subway using public bond finance. It was difficult for Livingstone to block the PPP process, which was entirely in the national Government's hands as it still owned London Underground, which was not transferred to local control until July 2003. Kiley was fired from the board of London Regional Transport (of which he had been chairman) during 2001 over his attempts to block the PPP scheme. Livingstone mounted a legal challenge, but eventually dropped it as it was unlikely to succeed. It was later revealed that the legal challenge had cost £4.2 million directly, as well as £36 million reimbursed to the bidders for costs incurred because of the six-month delay.

Three packages of 30-year franchises were drawn up, covering the Jubilee, Northern and Piccadilly lines (JNP), the Bakerloo, Central, Victoria and Waterloo and City lines (BCV) and the sub-surface lines, the Metropolitan, District, Circle, East London and Hammersmith & City lines (SSL). During May 2001, it was announced that two preferred consortiums had been selected – Tube Lines (a consortium of Amey plc, Bechtel and Jarvis plc) and Metronet (a consortium of Balfour Beatty, WS Atkins, Bombardier, EDF Energy and Thames Water). Tube Lines planned to subcontract work to achieve the lowest possible cost, while Metronet awarded contracts directly to its shareholders.

JNP was won by Tube Lines in December 2002 while the BCV and SSL contracts were won by Metronet in March 2003; these were known as the "infracos" (infrastructure companies). Contracts were worth around £17 billion over the 30-year period, with each contract receiving around £660 million each month from the Government, although this amount was subject to reductions if targets are not met. In 2003, overall control of the system passed to TfL, which had been opposed to the arrangement.

==== Performance ====
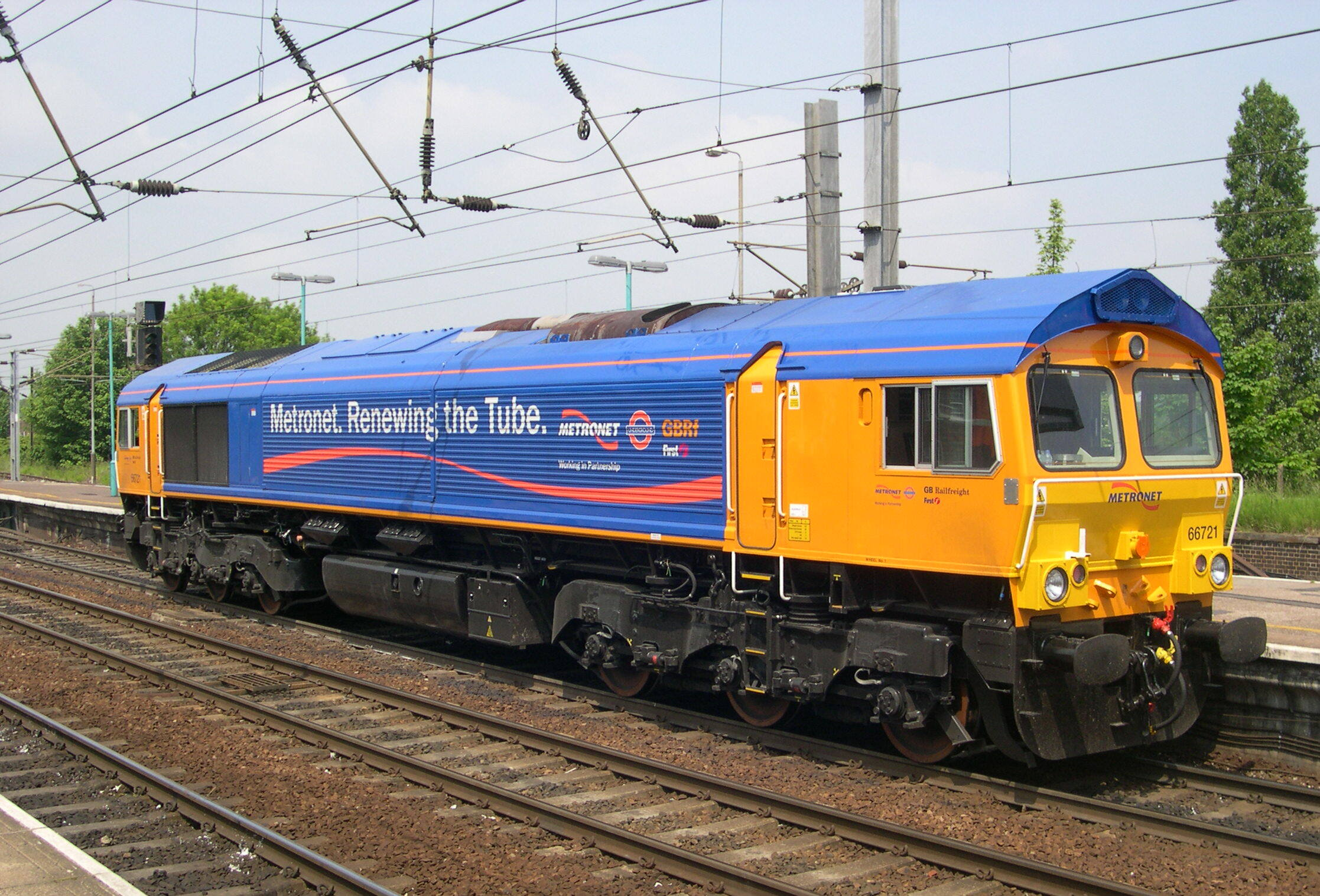
From 2006, Metronet used five Class 66 locomotives from GB Railfreight to help speed up track replacement works

In March 2005, the House of Commons Public Accounts Committee, charged with ensuring value for money in public spending, published a report concluding that it was "impossible to determine" whether the PPP was better value than a publicly run investment programme, primarily because of the untested periodic review structure of the 30-year contracts. These were to be revised every 7.5 years, meaning that the ultimate price for the promised £15.7 billion of investment was still unknown. It noted that using public bond finance would have saved £90 million per year in financing costs, even though the Government guaranteed repayment of 95% of costs in the event of premature termination, and the contracts placed limits and exemptions on financial risk transferred to the infrastructure companies. The system still received an annual public subsidy of £1 billion, but its spending was being determined entirely by the infracos' interpretation of their 2,000-page PPP contracts. Although the private operators were expected to receive at least 18–20% returns on capital (for Metronet), for the type of risk associated with major upgrades, most of the work was low-risk maintenance and replacement. The public-sector procurement option (using private companies for specific major projects) would also have saved the £455 million cost of concluding the PPP contracts, not to mention the five years' delay the contract negotiations caused.

In April 2005, the Commissioner of Transport for London, Bob Kiley, pressed for an urgent review of the PPP, describing its performance as "bordering on disaster". TfL also said that new technology promised by Metronet had yet to be seen — "We were supposed to be getting private sector expertise and technology with the PPP (Public Private Partnership) but instead they are just using the same old kit." One week later, the chief executive of Metronet was sacked, after complaints that the company had made £50 million profit despite being behind on all its major works. By April 2005, Metronet had started work on only 13 station refurbishments, instead of 32 as scheduled, and was more than a year behind on the refurbishment of 78 District line trains. It was also behind on its track replacement programme, having completed 28 km of the anticipated 48 km.

During March 2005, the House of Commons Transport Select Committee noted that "Availability is the most important factor for Tube travellers. All the infracos needed to do to meet their availability benchmarks was to perform only a little worse than in the past. On most lines, they did not even manage that." During November 2006, Metronet were heavily criticised by the arbiter of the PPP, the Office of Rail Regulation (ORR) over their performance from 2003 to 2006. Specific analysis included the finding that Metronet had not performed in an economic or efficient manner, and had failed to follow good industry practice. The ORR also stated that Metronet would be held responsible for £750 million in cost overruns.

Metronet was also declared at fault by an accident investigators' report into a May 2004 derailment at White City, for failing to implement sufficient safety checks despite being ordered to do so by TfL. Three years later, Metronet admitted that it may have caused a Central Line train derailment near Mile End, in which a train hit a fire blanket left by maintenance workers.

==== TfL takes over infracos ====
Metronet, which used its shareholders as its main contractors, was unable to meet its targets and track replacement and station refurbishments fell behind schedule. In April 2007, Mayor Ken Livingstone stated that Metronet could collapse due to a £750 million overspend. On 18 July 2007, the company went into administration; during May 2008, the company's responsibilities were formally transferred back into public ownership under the authority of TfL.

The British government tried to find another private firm to fill the vacuum left by the liquidation of Metronet. However, only TfL expressed a viable interest in taking over Metronet's responsibilities. The case for the PPP model was also weakened in 2008 when it was revealed that the demise of Metronet had cost the government £2bn. The five private companies that made up the Metronet alliance had to pay £70m each towards paying off the debts acquired by the consortium. However, due to a deal struck with the government in 2003, when the PPP scheme began operating, the companies were protected from any further liability, thus the British taxpayer therefore had to foot the rest of the bill. This outcome undermined the argument that PPP would place the risks involved in running the network into the hands of the private sector.

By early 2010, Tube Lines was behind schedule on the Jubilee line upgrade and after conflict arose over costs of future work in that year's PPP review, Prior to this point, Tube Lines had reportedly brought in almost all of its projects both on time and on budget. On 7 May 2010, Transport for London agreed to buy out Bechtel and Amey (Ferrovial), the shareholders of Tube Lines, in exchange for £310 million, formally ending the PPP. Combined with the takeover of Metronet, this meant that all maintenance was thereafter managed in-house, although TfL has continued to involve a large number of private suppliers and contractors.

Despite the collapse of the PPP, substantial investment to upgrade and modernise the Tube has taken place – with new trains (such as London Underground S7 and S8 Stock), new signalling, upgraded stations (such as King's Cross St Pancras) and improved accessibility (such as at Green Park).

=== Recent history ===
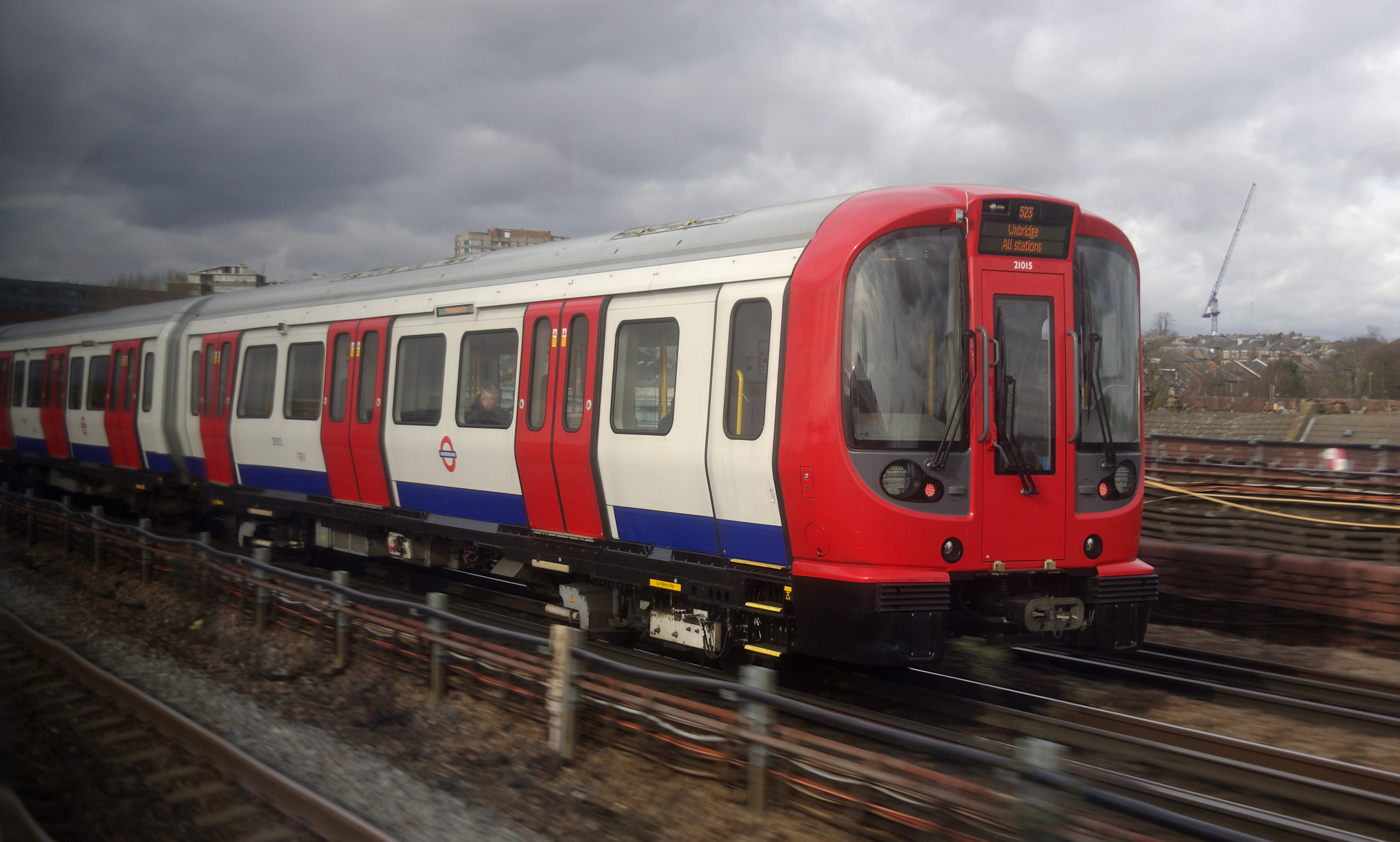
S Stock has now replaced older trains on the Metropolitan, Circle, Hammersmith & City & District lines

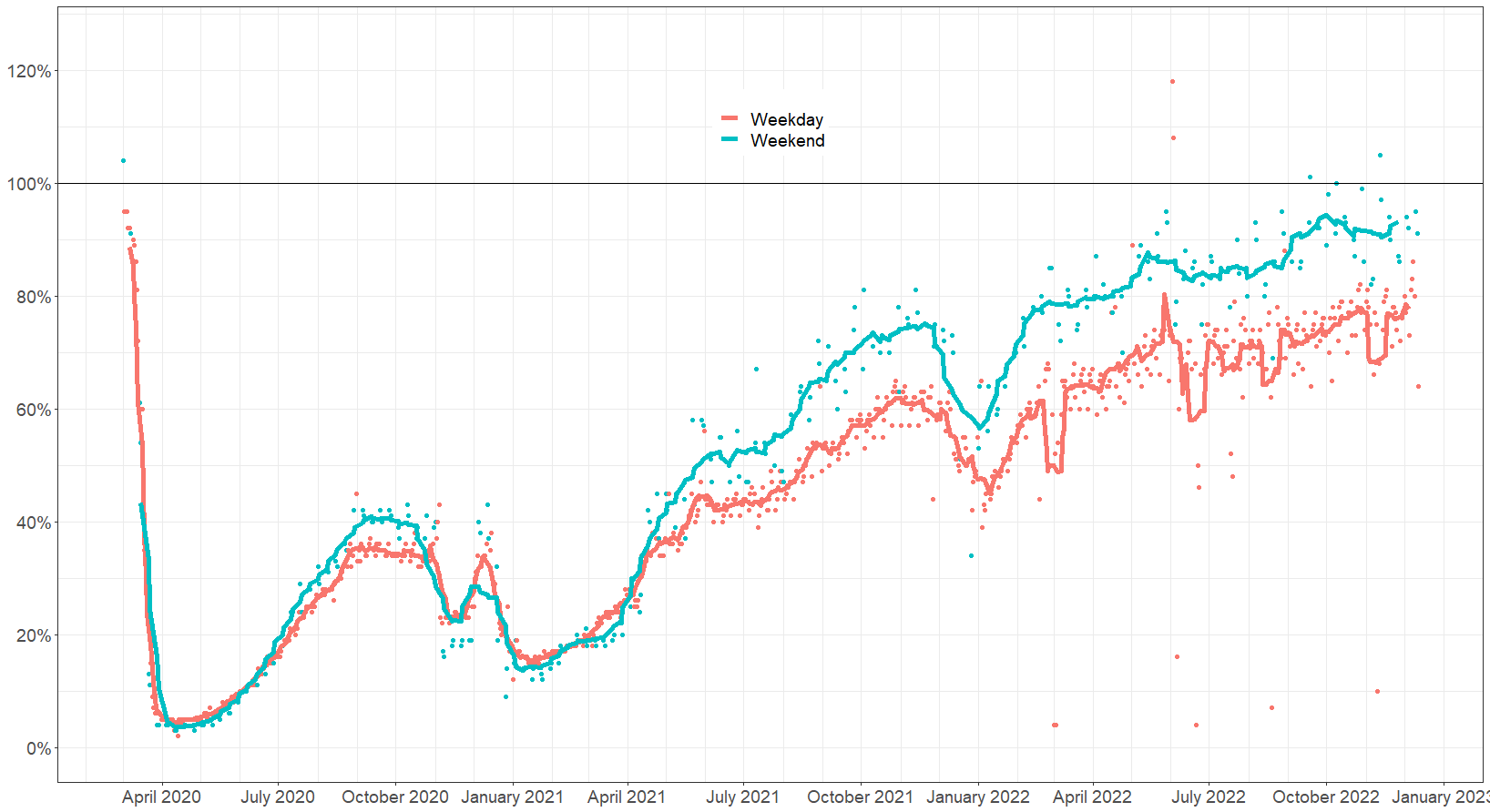
London Tube usage March 2020 to December 2022

The Oyster card, a stored-value contactless smart card that can be used on Transport for London services instead of a ticket, first went on sale during 2003. The scheme was originally managed as a PPP by TranSys; TfL bought the rights to the Oyster card name in 2008.

On 7 July 2005, three bombs exploded on underground trains, two on the Circle line at Aldgate and Edgware Road and the third on the Piccadilly line between King's Cross and Russell Square. Later that day, a bomb exploded on a bus in Woburn Place. Four suicide bombers had killed themselves and 52 other people, and it took over a month before underground services had been restored.

In 2007, the East London line, operated as an isolated shuttle since 1939, closed so that it could be converted into a London Overground line. In December 2009 the Circle line changed from serving a closed loop around the centre of London on the north side of the River Thames to a spiral serving Hammersmith.

On the Jubilee line a seventh car was added to all trains, in 2006 and a new signalling system allowing automatic operation was commissioned in 2011. On the Victoria line, new trains were introduced between July 2009 and June 2011, and a new signalling system has allowed 33 trains per hour from January 2013. The sub-surface (Metropolitan, District, Circle and Hammersmith & City) lines have been upgraded, with new air-conditioned S Stock. Also, the sub-surface track, electrical supply and signalling systems are also being upgraded in a programme allowing an increased peak-hour capacity by the end of 2018. A single control room for the sub-surface network is to be established in Hammersmith and an automatic train control (ATC) system will replace signalling equipment installed from the 1940s.

During the London 2012 Olympic and Paralympic Games, the Underground saw record ridership levels, with over 4.3 million people using the Tube on some days. This record was subsequently beaten in future years, with 4.82 million riders in December 2015. In 2013, the Underground celebrated its 150th anniversary, with celebratory events such as steam trains and installation of a unique Labyrinth artwork at each station.

In the 2010s, the Crossrail project was built at a cost of £18.8bn to connect two mainline railways with a new east west tunnel under central London, similar to Paris' Réseau Express Régional. Designed to increase rail capacity and reduce cross London journey times, the line opened as the Elizabeth line in May 2022. Although not part of the Underground, the line connects with many Underground stations, with the project rebuilding and expanding several central Underground stations including Tottenham Court Road.

Usage of the Underground was heavily affected by the COVID-19 pandemic of the early 2020s. After growing concern that amongst the outbreak and despite government advice on social distancing, tube services were still crowded. All Night Overground and Night Tube services, as well as all services on the Waterloo & City line, were suspended from 20 March, while 40 tube stations were closed on the same day. The Mayor of London and TfL urged people to use public transport only if absolutely essential, so that it could be used by critical workers. London Underground brought in new measures on 25 March to combat the spread of the virus by slowing the flow of passengers onto platforms, which included the imposition of queuing at ticket gates and turning off some escalators. Even with these measures in place there was still criticism that, especially in the rush hour, some stations and trains were experiencing crowding; however, statistics showed that the tube was experiencing some of the lowest passenger journey numbers since the 1800s.

The Northern Line Extension opened in September 2021, extending the Northern line from Kennington to Battersea Power Station via Nine Elms. The extension was privately funded, with contributions from developments across the Battersea Power Station, Vauxhall and Nine Elms areas.

== Goods traffic ==
Goods trains ran over Metropolitan tracks from 1866 when the Great Northern Railway (GNR) and then the Midland Railways began a service to south of the Thames via Farringdon and Snow Hill tunnel. Goods depots were opened in the Farringdon area, accessed from the City Widened Lines. The GWR opened Smithfield Market Sidings in 1869, the GNR opened its depot in 1874, and the Midland during 1878. The Midland also negotiated running rights over the District Railway from the London & South Western Railway at Hammersmith to South Kensington in 1876; two years later, it opened coal depots at Kensington High Street and West Kensington.

Goods traffic was to play an important part of Metropolitan traffic on the extension line out of Baker Street. During 1880, the Met started conveying coal from Finchley Road to Harrow. Goods and coal depots were provided at most of the stations on the extension line as they were built. Goods for London were initially handled at Willesden, with delivery by road or by transfer to the Midland. In 1909, the Met opened Vine Street goods depot near Farringdon with a regular service from West Hampstead. Coal for the steam locomotives, the company's electric power station at Neasden and local gasworks were brought in via Quainton Road. Milk was delivered to the London suburbs and foodstuffs from Vine Street to Uxbridge. Fish to Billingsgate Market via the Met and the District joint station at Monument caused some complaints, leaving the station approaches in an "indescribably filthy condition". The District suggested a separate entrance for the fish, but nothing was done. The traffic reduced significantly when road transport was introduced from to Marylebone, but the problem remained until 1936, being one reason the LPTB gave for abolishing the carrying of parcels on trains. The LPTB was also not interested in running the Metropolitan goods services. Vine Street goods station closed in 1936, and the London and North Eastern Railway (LNER) took over all freight traffic from 1937.

When the Northern line was extended over the lines of the LNER to High Barnet and Mill Hill East in 1940, the stations retained their goods service. Starting at midnight trains would leave Highbury every five to ten minutes and access the line from Finsbury Park via Highgate High Level. The Central line stations also kept their goods service, worked from Temple Mills and accessed via Leytonstone, the Hainault loop stations being served via Woodford.

Goods services were gradually withdrawn during the 1950s and 1960s. The GNR goods depot on the City Widened Lines was closed in 1956 and Smithfield Market was last served by freight trains in 1962. Goods yards on the Uxbridge branch closed in 1964, and Northern line stations saw their last goods train in the same year. The closure of West Kensington yard the following year meant the withdrawal of goods trains from District and Piccadilly tracks. On the Central line, Hainault loop stations lost their goods service in 1965 and the rest of the line followed during the following year.

== See also ==
London transit:

- Docklands Light Railway
- London Overground
- Tramlink

Other subway histories:

- History of the New York City Subway
