= Westferry Circus =

Public space in Canary Wharf

Coordinates: 51°30′20.61″N 0°1′36.73″W

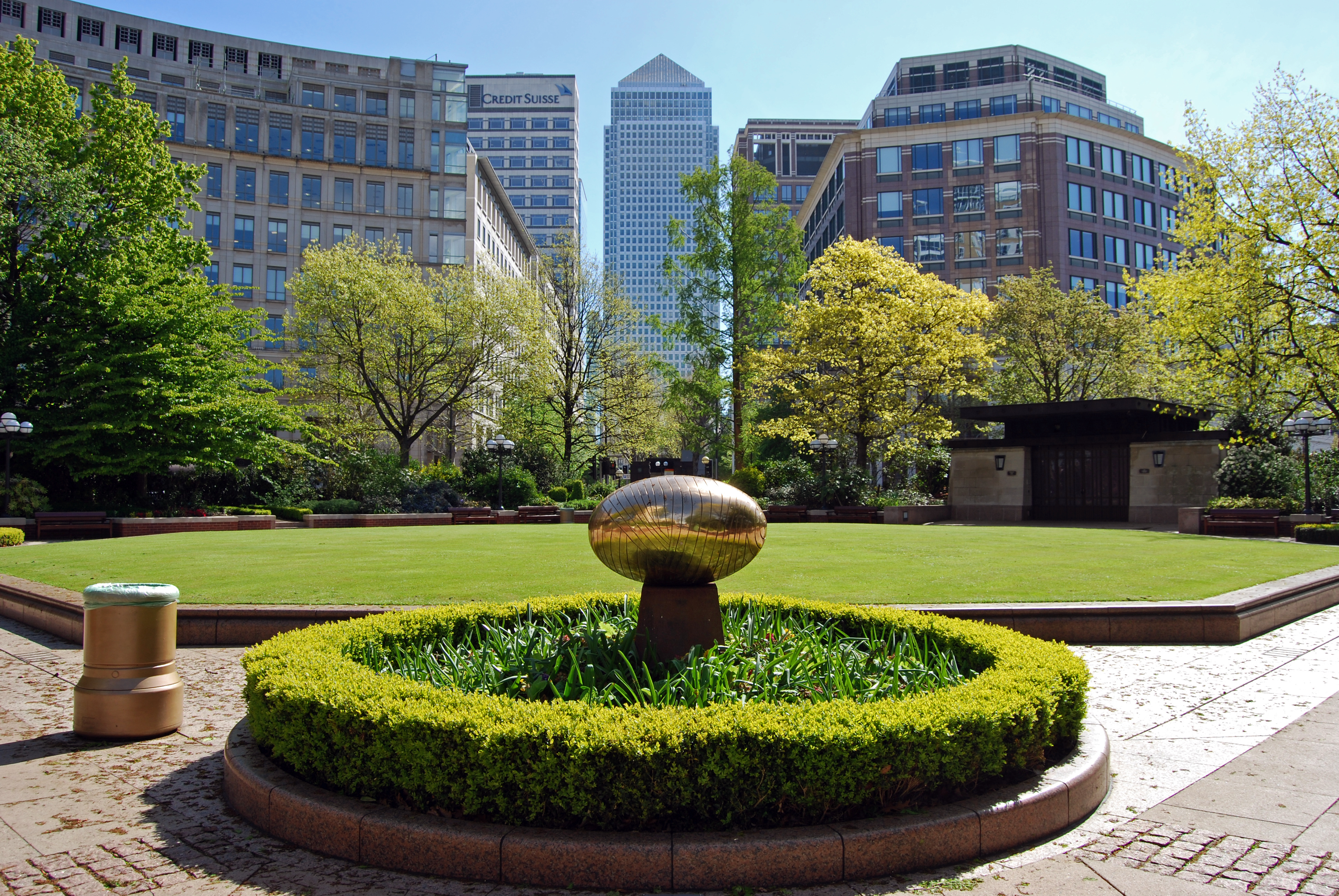
View eastwards from Westferry Circus upper roundabout towards One Canada Square

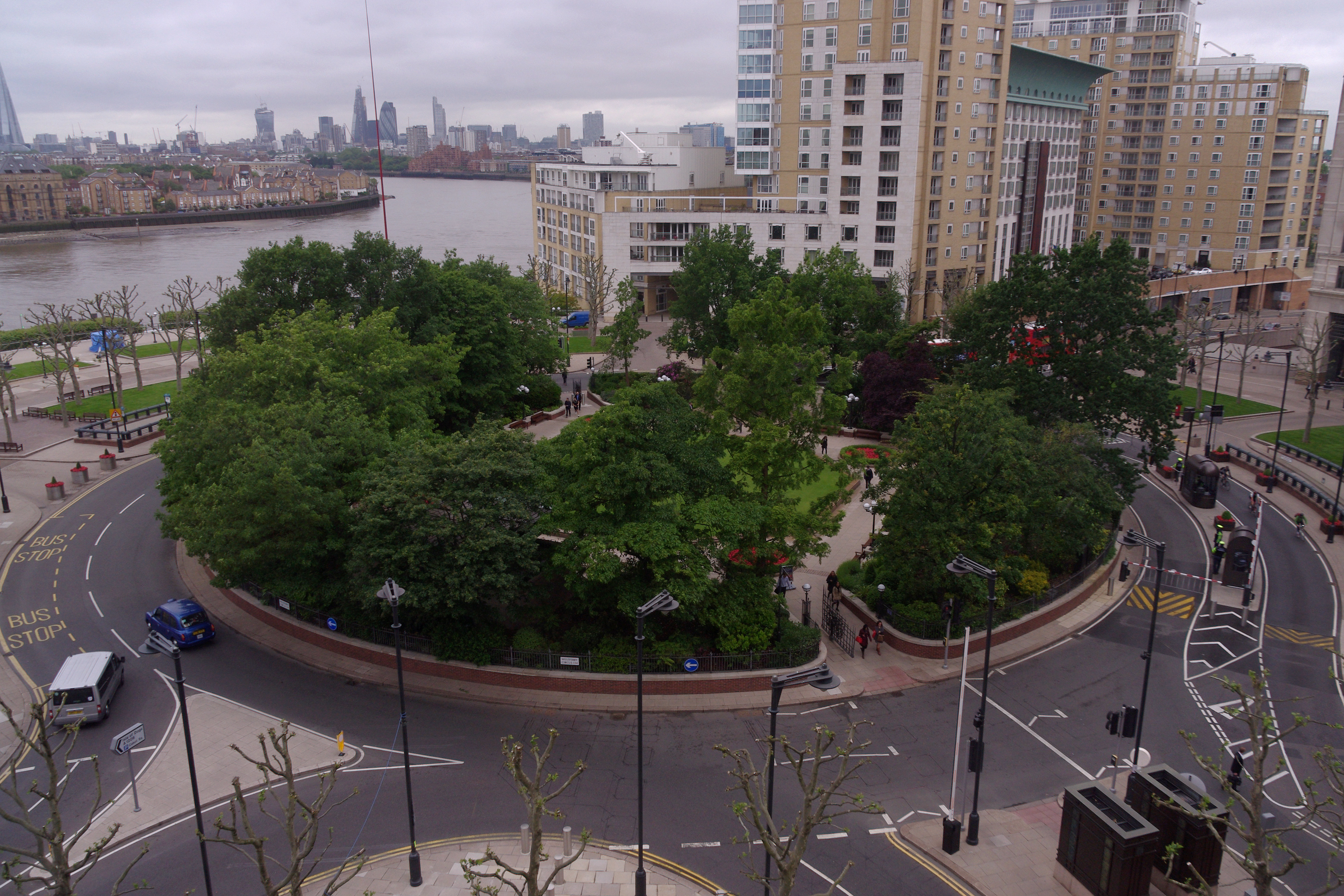
The roundabout

Westferry Circus is a road interchange and public space in Canary Wharf estate in London, and contains a two-level road interchange. There are two roundabouts, one above the other. It was designed by Laurie Olin. In this context, a circus, from the Latin word meaning "circle", is a round open space at a street junction.

Notable buildings on the street include 11 Westferry Circus and 15 Westferry Circus.

Tower Hamlets Council pays for the lighting in the lower roundabout, which is on all the time. This costs £34,800 per annum.
