= Terry Morgan =

British engineer (born 1948)

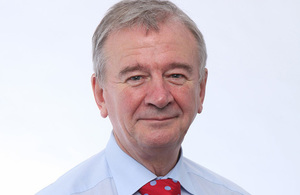
Sir Terry Morgan

Sir Terence Keith Morgan CBE FREng FIEE (born 28 December 1948) is a British engineer.

== Early life ==
Terry Morgan was born in 1948. His early education was at Croesycelliog Secondary Modern School. He studied for an HND at Newport and Monmouthshire College of Technology. Morgan graduated from Birmingham University with an MSc degree in Engineering Production and Management.

== Career ==
Morgan became Chairman of Crossrail in 2009. Between 2002 and 2009 he was Chief Executive Officer of Tube Lines, the public–private partnership company that was responsible for the maintenance, renewal and upgrade of the infrastructure of three London Underground lines. Morgan is Non-Executive Chairman of the Manufacturing Technology Centre and of the National Skills Academy for Railway Engineering. He is a past president of the Chartered Management Institute.

Morgan was appointed a Fellow of the Royal Academy of Engineering in 1994. He was appointed a Fellow of the Institute of Electrical Engineers in 1996. He has been awarded the Silver Medal of the Institute of Management. Morgan was appointed Commander of the Order of the British Empire (CBE) in the 2009 New Year Honours for services to public transport and was knighted in the 2016 Birthday Honours for services to infrastructure, skills, and employment. Morgan was awarded the honorary degree of Doctor of Engineering by Birmingham University in 2013.

Business positions
Preceded by	Chairman of Crossrail; 2009 -	Succeeded by Incumbent
Preceded by	Chairman of High Speed 2; 2018 -	Succeeded by Incumbent
Preceded by	Chief Executive of Tube Lines; 2002 - 2009	Succeeded by
