= Bob Kiley =

Transport executive

Robert R. Kiley
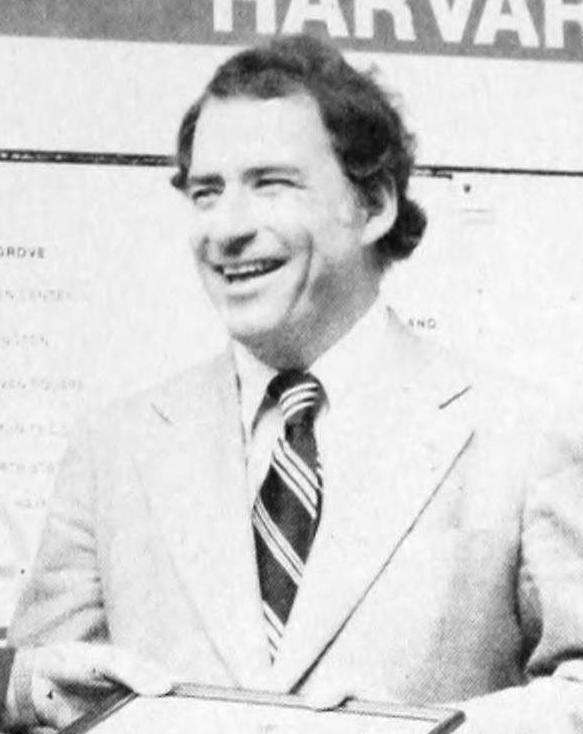
- Kiley at Harvard station in 1978

Commissioner of Transport for London
- In office October 2000 – 2006
- Appointed by: Ken Livingstone
- Preceded by: Position established
- Succeeded by: Peter Hendy

5th Chairman and CEO of the Metropolitan Transportation Authority
- In office November 16, 1983 – January 2, 1991
- Governor: Mario Cuomo
- Preceded by: Richard Ravitch
- Succeeded by: Peter Stangl

CEO of the Massachusetts Bay Transportation Authority
- In office 1975–1979
- Preceded by: Joseph C. Kelly
- Succeeded by: Robert Foster

Deputy Mayor of Boston
- In office 1972–1975
- Appointed by: Kevin White
- Succeeded by: Katherine Kane

Personal details
- Born: September 16, 1935 Minneapolis, Minnesota
- Died: August 9, 2016 (aged 80) Chilmark, Massachusetts
- Education: University of Notre Dame, Indiana
- Occupation: Deputy mayor of Boston, 1974-1977; CEO of the Massachusetts Bay Transportation Authority, 1975-1979; Chairman, Metropolitan Transportation Authority (MTA), 1983-1990; Commissioner of Transport for London, 2001-2006
- Known for: Public transport planner

Robert R. Kiley (September 16, 1935 – August 9, 2016) was an American public transit planner and supervisor known for his ability to rehabilitate transit systems experiencing serious problems. From 2001 to 2006 he was the first commissioner of Transport for London, the public organisation that runs and maintains London's public transport network.

Kiley also worked as a CIA agent, CEO of the Massachusetts Bay Transportation Authority, deputy mayor of Boston, chairman and CEO of the Metropolitan Transportation Authority, and president and CEO of the New York City Partnership. He is credited as being the architect of the revival of Boston and New York's ailing public transport systems in the 1970s and 1980s respectively.

Kiley unsuccessfully ran for mayor of Boston in 1983.

== Minneapolis, Boston and New York ==
Kiley was born in Minneapolis, Minnesota and educated at the University of Notre Dame in Indiana. He graduated magna cum laude and went on to study at Harvard's Graduate School. In 1963 he joined the Central Intelligence Agency. The BBC reported that although former colleagues say it would be incorrect to regard Bob Kiley as a "spook," he did travel around the world in his role as manager of intelligence operations. He later served as executive assistant to agency director Richard Helms.

Kiley left the CIA in 1970 and embarked on a career in management. He first worked as an assistant director at the Police Foundation in Washington D.C. Two years later, he became deputy mayor of Boston, a position he held for three years. During his time as deputy mayor, he prioritised public safety during the court-mandated desegregation of schools. In 1975 Kiley took on two new roles – one as adjunct professor of public management at Boston University and the other as chairman and CEO of the Massachusetts Bay Transportation Authority. He left the MBTA in 1979 and became a vice president at the Management Analysis Center (now part of Capgemini).

In 1983 Kiley moved to New York City to become the chairman and CEO of the Metropolitan Transportation Authority (MTA). He remained in the position until 1990 and in his time in the role secured state funding to the tune of $16bn to revitalise the railroads, buses and subways in the MTA region. Gene Russianoff, of the New York Straphangers Campaign, said that the money was spent wisely – "Even normally grudging New Yorkers say he did a good job," Russianoff said. The clean-up campaign involving arresting fare dodgers and cleaning up graffiti is now regarded as a prelude to the citywide policy of "zero tolerance" enforced by Rudy Giuliani during his time as Mayor in the 1990s.

In 1991 Kiley became president of the New York construction company Fischbach Corporation. He briefly held the role of chairman before moving again to become president and CEO of the New York City Partnership in 1995. From 1994 to 1998 he was also principal of Kohlberg & Company, a financial company. Kiley's Transport for London biography notes that Kiley was also "Member of the Council on Foreign Relations, board member of the Salzburg Seminar, the American Repertory Theater, MONY Group Inc, the Princeton Review Inc and Edison Schools, Inc. He was on the Advisory Board of the Harvard University Center for State and Local Government".

== London ==
In October 2000, Kiley was recruited to become the first commissioner of Transport for London (TfL), London's new integrated transport body, reporting directly to the mayor of London. Following his appointment, Kiley was criticised by the press due to his £4m four-year contract, the use of a £2m grace and favour property in Belgravia, and his expatriate status. He was regarded by the press as "a strange bedfellow" for Ken Livingstone, the socialist elected in 2000 as London's first mayor. However, Livingstone considered Kiley "the best candidate," with very similar views on transportation to himself. In January 2001 Kiley became Chairman of London Regional Transport (the public body appointed by the Secretary of State for Transport to run London's Underground network of trains), replacing Sir Malcolm Bates.

Livingstone's and Kiley's were opposed to the government's plans for public-private partnerships (PPP) to run London Underground. Kiley was sacked as chairman of London Regional Transport in July 2001 amid repeated clashes with his boss, Transport Secretary Stephen Byers, and was replaced by Malcolm Bates, who returned to lead the organisation. Remaining as commissioner of Transport for London, he and Livingstone took the government to court in trying to prevent PPP. They failed, and in January 2003 two separate private companies – Metronet and Tube Lines – took control of maintaining various tube lines. In July 2003 powers for running the rest of the Tube network, including manning and maintaining the stations, was transferred to TfL and London Regional Transport became defunct. Kiley welcomed the opportunity to take greater control over the running of the Tube, but warned that he felt he would be hampered by PPP:

"I maintain that the Government’s Public Private Partnership (PPP) is not the right way to manage the maintenance and renewal of the Tube. As they stand, the PPP contracts do not satisfactorily address the improvements to the Underground that TfL and the public demand. Nevertheless, we will do everything within our power to hold the infrastructure companies to account on those Tube improvements they have promised to deliver."

— Robert Kiley

Subsequently, the PPPs collapsed due to financial difficulties in the late 2000s.

In November 2005, Kiley announced that he would be standing down in January 2006, after five years in the job, albeit three years earlier than expected. Kiley was credited as helping Livingstone bring in the London congestion charge, introducing the Oyster card payment system, as well as improving the quality and frequency of Buses in London. He was paid almost £2 million in a settlement for standing down, and remained as a £3,200-a-day consultant. In a controversial interview with the London Evening Standard, he admitted he was unsure exactly what he did to deserve his consultancy fee, and denied rumours of a rift with Livingstone. He also revealed his struggles with alcoholism, exacerbated by overwork and the loss of his family in a car accident, followed by the death of his father shortly afterwards. He was replaced as Commissioner by Peter Hendy in February 2006.

== Personal life ==
Kiley's first wife and two children died in a car accident in 1974. He was married to his second wife, Rona, at the time of his death. They have two sons.

== Films ==
- 2025 - Cover-Up

== See also ==
- Richard Ravitch
- Christopher O. Ward

Civic offices
Preceded by Richard Ravitch	Chairman & CEO of the MTA; 1983-1991	Succeeded by Peter Stangl
Preceded by Sir Malcolm Bates	Chairman of London Regional Transport; 2001	Succeeded by Sir Malcolm Bates
New title	Commissioner of Transport for London; 2000–2006	Succeeded by Sir Peter Hendy
