= Tube Lines =

British infrastructure company

Tube Lines Limited
- Type: Limited company
- Industry: Railways
- Founded: 7 February 2000; 26 years ago
- Fate: Sold to public sector on 7 May 2010; equity acquired by Transport for London
- Headquarters: 15 Westferry Circus, London, England
- Key people: Brian Sedar (Bechtel); Lee Jones (Ferrovial); Terry Morgan Chief Executive
- Owner: Bechtel; Amey; Jarvis
- Number of employees: 3,500 (initially)
- Website: www.tubelines.com

Tube Lines Limited, initially known as Infraco JNP (an amalgamation of infrastructure and company), was an asset-management company responsible for the maintenance, renewal and upgrade of the infrastructure, including track, trains, signals, civils work and stations, of three London Underground lines.

It was established in 2000 as a consortium of several private companies (Amey plc, Bechtel and Jarvis plc) to bid for public-private partnership (PPP) opportunities on the Underground. During April 2003, Tube Lines began to maintain, upgrade and renew infrastructure on the Jubilee, Northern and Piccadilly lines under a 30 year contract. It was one of two such infrastructure companies (the other being Metronet) to enter into a public-private partnership (PPP) with London Underground at that time. Under the terms of the PPP, Tube Lines was committed to the delivery of substantial improvements to the network via the refurbishment, upgrading and renewing of track, trains, tunnels, signals and stations. To encourage high reliability rates, financial deductions were incurred for poor performance at twice the rate of increase in revenue for improved performance.

The PPP arrangement was closely scrutinised by the British government; by early 2005, both the House of Commons Transport Select Committee and the Public Accounts Committee were criticising the opaque nature of the PPP as well as questioning the value for money in comparison to a publicly run investment programme. That same year, Jarvis plc divested itself from involvement in the consortium. Several of the improvements promised by Tube Lines were delayed considerably or ultimately cancelled. During late 2009, Tube Lines requested that Transport for London (TfL) provide an additional £1.75 billion to cover a funding shortfall to perform upgrades to which TfL declined.

During May 2010, TfL agreed to buy out Bechtel and Amey (Ferrovial), the shareholders of Tube Lines, for £310 million. Having followed a similar takeover of Metronet, this meant that all maintenance on the London Underground was thereafter managed in-house and no longer involved any PPPs, although numerous private suppliers and contractors have continued to be used by TfL. In this manner, Amey continued to provide TfL with management and maintenance services for the Jubilee, Northern and Piccadilly lines until the end of 2017. Tube Lines has been a wholly owned subsidiary of TfL since May 2010, and was rebranded as "London Underground".

== History ==
=== Background ===
During the mid 1990s, the Conservative government conducted a deep exploration of various options for involving the private sector in the operations of the London Underground. These options included its complete privatisation, akin to that of British Rail. This option was publicly opposed by the Labour Party, who stated in their New Labour, New Life for Britain manifesto for the upcoming general election that the wholesale privatisation of the Underground was not the answer and proposed the use of a public-private partnership (PPP) arrangement instead.

Following the election, the new Labour government promptly began work on setting up PPPs, stating that this would address the perceived period of underinvestment in the Underground. The selected model called for the operation of services on the Tube to remain in the hands of the public sector while the infrastructure (including the track, trains, tunnels, signals, and stations) would be leased to private firms for a 30 year period, during which they would enact various improvements. A public denial that the newly-formed railway infrastructure company Railtrack would be involved in the PPP was issued by the government after it was made clear that some parties would refuse to bid if it was. By the turn of the century, senior figures within the government was strongly advocating for the implementation of these PPPs.

Tube Lines was founded in 2000 by a consortium of Amey plc (a subsidiary of Ferrovial), Bechtel and Jarvis plc to jointly bid for the PPP contract. During January 2005, Jarvis sold its stake in the consortium to fellow shareholder Amey in exchange for £147 million. Tube Lines planned to subcontract work to achieve the lowest possible cost, while Metronet (the other PPP consortium) awarding contracts directly to its shareholders.

=== Formation of the PPP ===
The bidding process was protracted by political factors, including public disagreements on the topic of PPPs between then-Mayor of London Ken Livingstone and Deputy Prime Minister John Prescott. Furthermore, in the aftermath of the Hatfield rail crash, there was a climate of both public and political skepticism in the involvement of the private sector in transport infrastructure. During early 2001, Bob Kiley, the first commissioner of Transport for London (TfL) and an outspoken critic of the prospective PPPs, was put in charge of the process. Kiley was also empowered to revise the terms of the prospective contracts; he promptly produced updated briefs for the PPPs, a move which thus necessitated the submission of revised bids.

During May 2001, it was announced that both Metronet and Tube Lines had been selected as the preferred consortiums. Tube Lines emerged as the successful bidder for the 30 year JNP (tube) lines contract, serving the Jubilee, Northern and Piccadilly lines. A second PPP consortium, Metronet, held the other two contracts for the nine remaining London Underground lines. Both Metronet and Tube Lines were colloquially referred to as "infracos"; there was repeated speculation that the two companies planned to merge. Contracts were worth around £17 billion over the 30-year period, with each contract receiving around £660 million each month from the Government, although this amount was subject to reductions if targets are not met.

On 31 December 2002, Tube Lines began to maintain, upgrade and renewal London Underground infrastructure at the PPP came into force. Amongst its first actions was a review of ongoing upgrades, efforts to restructure rolling works packages into longer-term framework agreements, and reduce the number of suppliers involved in pursuit of a 10 per cent reduction in operating costs. Tube Lines won the contract to operate the London Underground emergency response unit – servicing all Underground lines and other transport services.

=== Commitments under the PPP ===
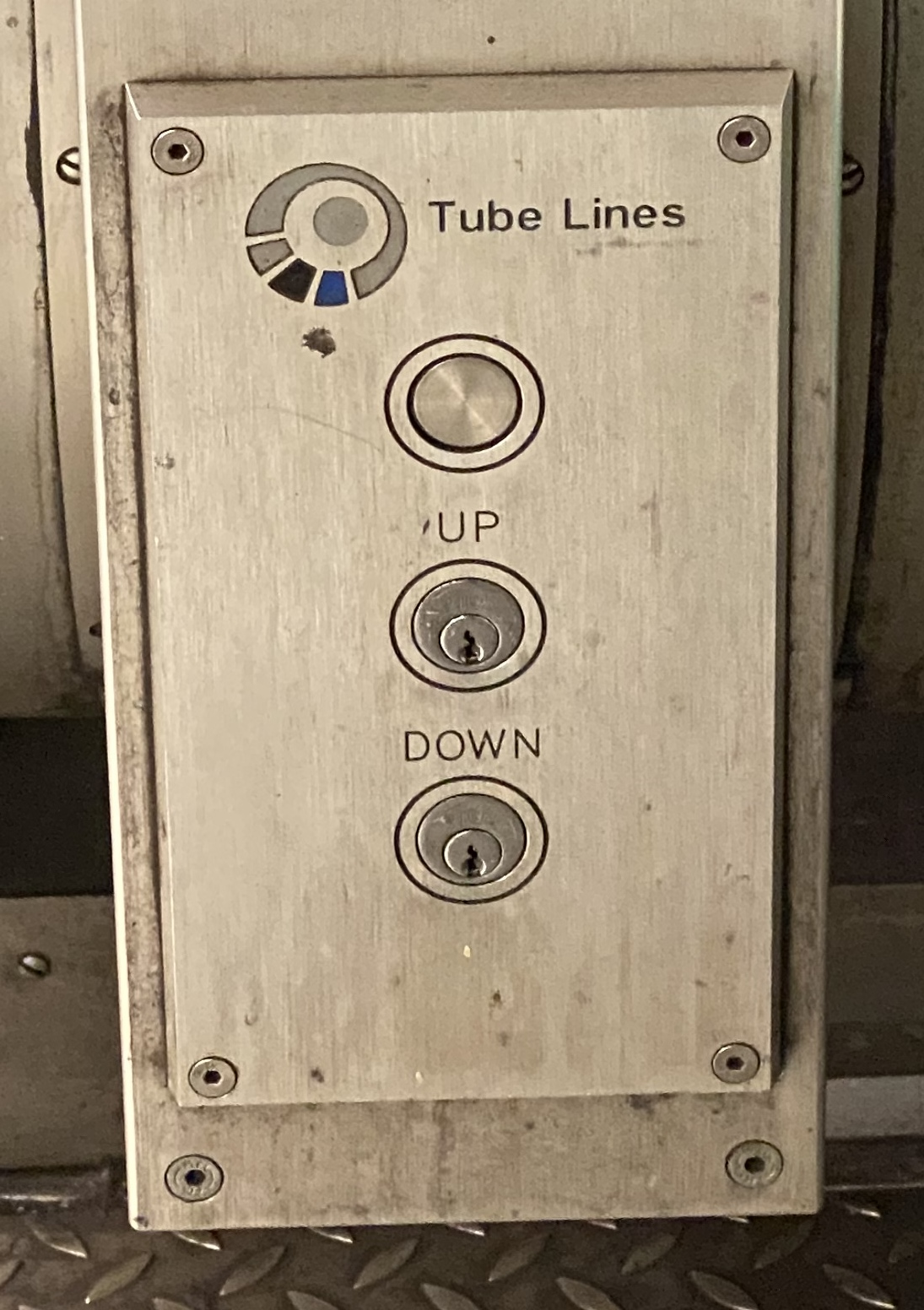
Some escalators on the London Underground have Tube Lines branding.

Under the terms of the PPP contracts, Tube Lines agreed to maintain London Underground infrastructure (track, trains, tunnels, signals, and stations) to the standards and performance levels set in the contract. Furthermore, the company committed to the delivery of various improvements across the network, to be achieved via the refurbishment, upgrading and renewing of the track, trains, tunnels, signals and stations. To encourage high reliability, deductions suffered for poor performance were set at twice the rate of increase in revenue for improved performance.

At a cost of £4.4 billion, Tube Lines promised substantial investment during the first 7.5 years of the contract (2003 to 2010):

- 100 stations (including lifts and escalators) modernised or refurbished
- 42 miles (68 km) of track replaced
- Upgrade and refurbishment of tunnels, bridges, embankments, track drainage and other civil structures
- Reconstruction and expansion of Wembley Park station
- Improvements to existing trains to improve reliability and reduce delays
- Additional carriage added to 1996 Stock trains to increase capacity on the Jubilee line
- New signalling system for the Jubilee and Northern lines
- 93 new Piccadilly line trains, which would enter service by 2014 (cancelled following the collapse of the PPP)

=== Performance and criticism ===
In June 2004, the National Audit Office criticised the complexity of the PPP deals, noting they offered "the prospect, but not the certainty" of improvements. During March 2005, the House of Commons Transport Select Committee noted that "Availability is the most important factor for Tube travellers. All the infracos needed to do to meet their availability benchmarks was to perform only a little worse than in the past. On most lines, they did not even manage that." In March 2005, the House of Commons Public Accounts Committee, charged with ensuring value for money in public spending, published a report concluding that it was "impossible to determine" whether the PPP was better value than a publicly run investment programme.

By November 2006, Metronet, the other PPP consortium, was £750 million over budget, whereas Tube Lines was delivering projects on time and on budget. Chief Executive of Tube Lines, Terry Morgan, noted the use of competitive procurement to minimise costs, unlike the closed shop approach of Metronet. During July 2007, Metronet collapsed and was placed into administration. In the following year, Metronet was subsequently taken over by TfL.

By 2008, Tube Lines had commenced negotiations for the next part of the 30-year contract. At the time, it noted that all of its major projects had been delivered on time (unlike the Metronet consortium), and that the Underground lines which it managed had become considerably more reliable - up to 70% more reliable in the case of the Piccadilly line.

During late 2009, Tube Lines had encountered a funding shortfall for its upgrades and requested that TfL provide an additional £1.75 billion to cover the shortfall. TfL refused, and referred the matter to the PPP arbiter, who stated that £400 million should be provided. Tube Lines was also criticised over the number of weekend and late night closures required to upgrade the Jubilee line signalling system.

=== Takeover by TfL ===
On 7 May 2010, Transport for London agreed to buy out Bechtel and Amey (Ferrovial), the shareholders of Tube Lines, for £310 million, formally ending the PPP. Commentators blamed the complex and "onerous" contracts for its failure. Combined with the takeover of Metronet, this meant that all maintenance was thereafter managed in-house, despite TfL using a large number of private suppliers and contractors. Some of the improvements promised by Tube Lines were subsequently delivered (such as new signalling on the Northern line), while other improvements were subsequently cancelled or delayed.

Amey continued to provide TfL with management and maintenance services for the Jubilee, Northern and Piccadilly lines until the end of 2017, when London Underground Limited took over from Amey. Tube Lines itself now been rebranded as "London Underground".

== See also ==
- History of the London Underground
- Metronet, the other PPP consortium responsible for London Underground infrastructure
