= Metronet (British infrastructure company) =

1999–2009 British railway maintenance company

Metronet Rail Ltd
- Company type: Private / consortium
- Industry: Railway infrastructure
- Founded: 1999
- Defunct: 2009
- Fate: Administration
- Headquarters: Templar House, High Holborn, London
- Key people: Andrew Cooper (BCV MD); David Crawley (SSL MD); Andrew Lezala (group CEO)
- Number of employees: approx. 6,000
- Parent: Atkins; Balfour Beatty; Bombardier Transportation; EDF Energy; Thames Water

Metronet Rail was an asset-management company responsible for the maintenance, renewal and upgrade of the infrastructure, including track, trains, signals, civils work and stations, on several London Underground lines. It was one of two infrastructure companies (the other being Tube Lines Ltd) in a public-private partnership (PPP) with the Underground.

Metronet was founded in 1999 as a consortium of several private companies to bid for a PPP, the British Government having signaled its intention to transfer such activity from the public sector, although the bidding process was protracted by political disagreements. Metronet emerged as the successful bidder for two 30-year contracts covering various tube and sub-surface lines; starting in 2003, it was responsible for the maintenance, renewal, and upgrade of the infrastructure (track, trains, tunnels, signals, and stations) on a total of nine Underground lines. To encourage high reliability rates, financial deductions were incurred for poor performance at twice the rate of increase in revenue for improved performance.

The PPP arrangement was closely scrutinised by the British government; by early 2005, both the House of Commons Transport Select Committee and the Public Accounts Committee were criticising the opaque nature of the PPP as well as questioning the value for money in comparison to a publicly run investment programme. In August 2004, Metronet was declared at fault for a May 2004 derailment at White City. In April 2005, the chief executive of Metronet was sacked following complaints that it had made £50 million profit despite being behind on all its major works. During November 2006, Metronet were heavily criticised by the Office of Rail Regulation (ORR) over their performance from 2003 to 2006. In July 2007, the company admitted that it may have caused a Central Line train derailment near Mile End.

Following financial difficulties, the company was placed in administration during July 2007. In May 2008, the company's responsibilities were transferred back into public ownership under the authority of Transport for London (TfL). In June 2009, the National Audit Office estimated that the failure of the Metronet PPP contract cost the taxpayer up to £410 million, adding that "most of the blame for Metronet's collapse lay with the consortium itself." The company was wound up in December 2009. After TfL opted to buy out the Tube Lines consortium in 2010, all Underground infrastructure maintenance was thereafter managed in-house.

== History ==
=== Background ===
During the mid 1990s, the Conservative government conducted a deep exploration of various options for involving the private sector in the operations of the London Underground. These options included its complete privatisation, akin to that of British Rail. This option was publicly opposed by the Labour Party, who stated in their New Labour, New Life for Britain manifesto for the upcoming general election that the wholesale privatisation of the Underground was not the answer and proposed the use of a public-private partnership (PPP) arrangement instead.

Following the election, the new Labour government promptly began work on setting up PPPs, stating that this would address the perceived period of underinvestment in the Underground. The selected model called for the operation of services on the Tube to remain in the hands of the public sector while the infrastructure (including the track, trains, tunnels, signals, and stations) would be leased to private firms for a 30 year period, during which they would enact various improvements. A public denial that the newly-formed railway infrastructure company Railtrack would be involved in the PPP was issued by the government after it was made clear that some parties would refuse to bid if it was. By the turn of the century, senior figures within the government was strongly advocating for the implementation of these PPPs.

Metronet was founded in 1999 as a consortium of companies to bid for PPP contracts. The equal shareholders in the venture were Atkins, Balfour Beatty, Adtranz (later Bombardier Transportation), SEEBOARD (later EDF Energy), and Thames Water.

To pay for the works, each company provided £70 million of equity; a further £2 billion was raised using bank loans, and £600 million from the European Investment Bank. The consortium awarded contracts to its own shareholders, for example rolling stock contracts were awarded to Bombardier Transportation. This closed shop supply chain approach was later criticised for causing high costs for the consortium.

=== Formation of the PPP ===
The bidding process was protracted by political factors, including public disagreements on the topic of PPPs between then-Mayor of London Ken Livingstone and Deputy Prime Minister John Prescott. Furthermore, in the aftermath of the Hatfield rail crash, there was a climate of both public and political skepticism in the involvement of the private sector in transport infrastructure. During early 2001, Bob Kiley, the first commissioner of Transport for London (TfL) and an outspoken critic of the prospective PPPs, was put in charge of the process. Kiley was also empowered to revise the terms of the prospective contracts; he promptly produced updated briefs for the PPPs, a move which thus necessitated the submission of revised bids.

During May 2001, it was announced that both Metronet and Tube Lines had been selected as the preferred consortiums. Metronet emerged as the successful bidder for two 30-year contracts, covering various tube and sub-surface lines; specifically, the BCV (tube) lines contract involved the Bakerloo, Central, Victoria and Waterloo & City lines, while the SSL (sub-surface) lines contract covered Circle, District, East London, Hammersmith & City and Metropolitan lines.

Separately, Tube Lines was awarded the contract for the other London Underground lines – Jubilee, Northern and Piccadilly. Both Metronet and Tube Lines were colloquially referred to as "infracos"; there was repeated speculation that the two companies planned to merge. Contracts valued at around £17 billion over the 30-year period were issued, under which these companies received around £660 million each month from the Government, although this amount was subject to reductions if targets are not met.

In April 2003, Metronet began to maintain, upgrade and renew London Underground infrastructure as the PPP came into force.

=== Commitments under the PPP ===
Under the terms of the PPP contracts, Metronet agreed to maintain London Underground infrastructure (track, trains, tunnels, signals, and stations) to the standards and performance levels set in the contract. Furthermore, Metronet committed to delivering substantial improvements to the network, by refurbishing, upgrading and renewing track, trains, tunnels, signals, and stations. To encourage high reliability, deductions suffered for poor performance were set at twice the rate of increase in revenue for improved performance.

At a cost of £7 billion, Metronet promised substantial investment during the first 7.5 years of the contract (2003 to 2010):

- 147 stations (including lifts and escalators) modernised or refurbished by 2012
- 127 miles (204 km) of track renewed and 166 points/crossings replaced
- Upgrade and refurbishment of tunnels, bridges, embankments, track drainage and other civil structures
- Refurbishment of existing rolling stock, as well as making them more reliable
- 47 new trains with upgraded signalling on the Victoria line by 2012 (delivered as 2009 Stock)
- 190 new air conditioned trains for the District, Circle, Hammersmith & City and Metropolitan lines by 2015 (delivered as S Stock)
- 24 new Bakerloo line trains by 2019 (cancelled following the collapse of the PPP)

=== Performance and criticism ===
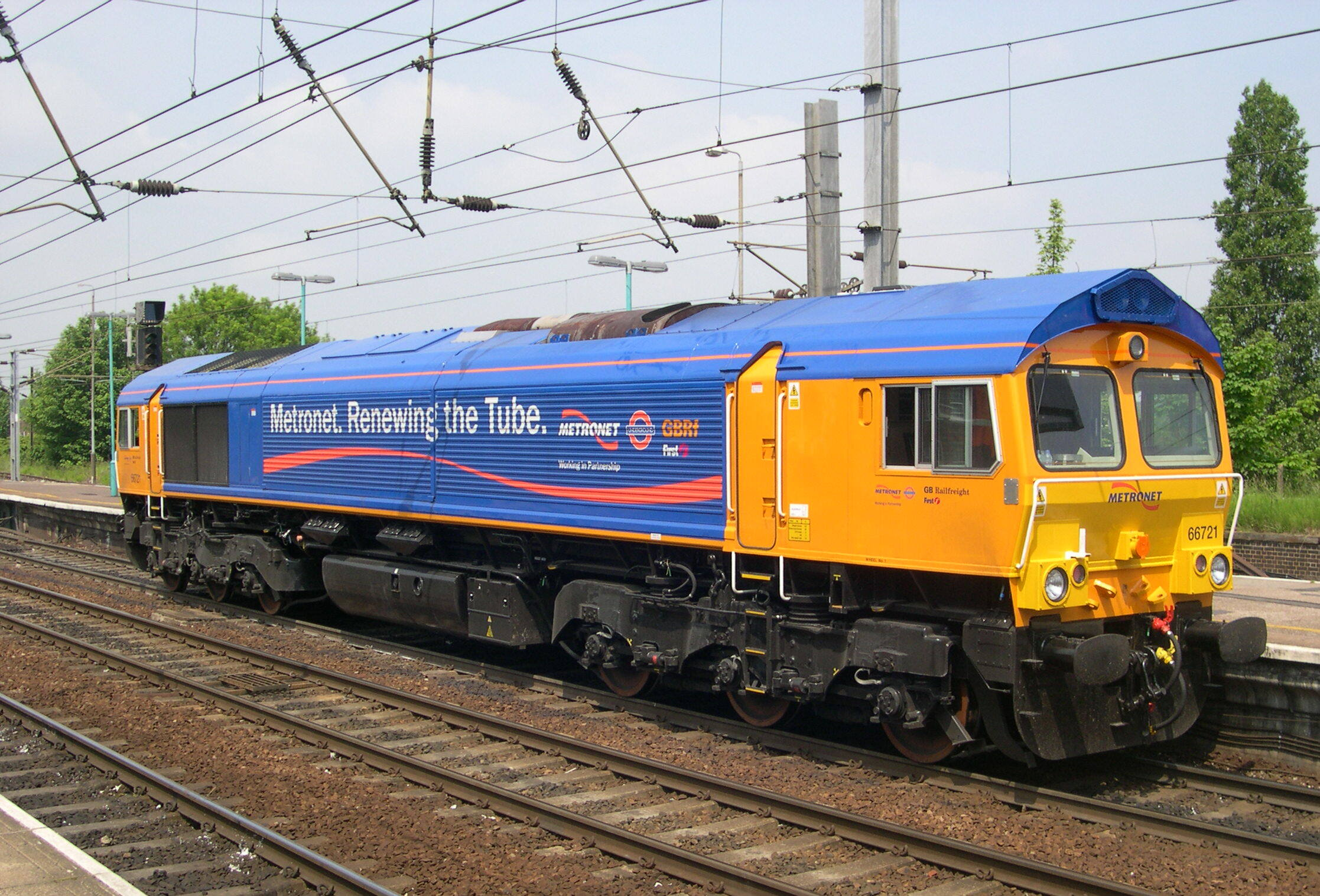
From 2006, Metronet used five Class 66 locomotives from GB Railfreight to help speed up track replacement works

In June 2004, the National Audit Office criticised the complexity of the PPP deals, noting they offered "the prospect, but not the certainty" of improvements. In August 2004, Metronet was declared at fault by an accident investigators' report into a May 2004 derailment at White City, for failing to implement sufficient safety checks despite being ordered to do so by TfL.

During March 2005, the House of Commons Transport Select Committee noted that "Availability is the most important factor for Tube travellers. All the infracos needed to do to meet their availability benchmarks was to perform only a little worse than in the past. On most lines, they did not even manage that." That same month, the House of Commons Public Accounts Committee, charged with ensuring value for money in public spending, published a report concluding that it was "impossible to determine" whether the PPP was better value than a publicly run investment programme.

In April 2005, the Commissioner of Transport for London, Bob Kiley, pressed for an urgent review of the PPP, describing its performance as "bordering on disaster". TfL also said that new technology promised by Metronet had yet to be seen — "We were supposed to be getting private sector expertise and technology with the PPP (Public Private Partnership) but instead they are just using the same old kit." One week later, the chief executive of Metronet was sacked, after complaints that the company had made £50 million profit despite being behind on all its major works. By April 2005, it had started work on only 13 station refurbishments, instead of 32 as scheduled, and was more than a year behind on the refurbishment of 78 District line trains. It was also behind on its track replacement programme, having completed 28 km of the anticipated 48 km.

During November 2006, Metronet were heavily criticised by the arbiter of the PPP, the Office of Rail Regulation (ORR) over their performance from 2003 to 2006. Specific analysis included the finding that Metronet had not performed in an economic or efficient manner, and had failed to follow good industry practice. The ORR also stated that Metronet would be held responsible for £750 million in cost overruns. The other PPP consortium, Tube Lines, noted that they were delivering projects on time and on budget.

In July 2007, Metronet admitted that it may have caused a Central Line train derailment near Mile End, in which a train hit a fire blanket left by maintenance workers.

=== Administration ===
In April 2007, Mayor Ken Livingstone stated that Metronet could collapse due to a £750 million overspend. In July 2007, it was reported that Metronet was "teetering on the brink of administration". The situation arose because it had received only £121 million out of the £551 million that was needed to cover cost over-runs. By contrast, Tube Lines, the other PPP consortium, had brought in almost all of its works on time and on budget. On 18 July 2007, the company was placed into administration.

To enable its business activities to be kept going while the winding-up of the company was in progress, the British Government provided Metronet with £2 billion in 2008. Following negotiations with Bombardier, Metronet modified contracts to allow for continued delivery of 2009 Stock and S Stock trains, while releasing Bombardier from its obligation to resignal the sub-surface lines.

== Aftermath ==
On 27 May 2008, Metronet came out of administration, and its contracts and employees were transferred to TfL under two new temporary companies, LUL Nominee BCV Ltd and LUL Nominee SSL Ltd. On 3 December 2009, the PPP business of Metronet Rail became an integral part of London Underground. Some of the improvements promised by Metronet were delivered (such as new 2009 Stock and S Stock trains), however other improvements were cancelled or delayed.

During early 2008, the Department for Transport rejected claims that the PPP was to blame for the collapse of Metronet, and that it was "predominantly a corporate failure", with "structural weaknesses [that] led to its own downfall." In 2010, the House of Commons' Public Accounts Committee reprimanded the Department for Transport for its failure to heed National Audit Office warnings about the company's management. According to the report from the Public Accounts Committee, around £170 million to £410m of taxpayer money was lost due to the failure of Metronet. The companies involved in the consortium collectively lost around £350 million in the collapse.

In May 2010, it was announced that TfL would buy out the Tube Lines consortium, formally ending the PPP. Commentators blamed the complex and "onerous" contracts for its failure. Combined with the takeover of Metronet, this meant that all maintenance was thereafter managed in-house, although TfL has continued to use a large number of private suppliers and contractors. By the beginning of 2011, with the formal liquidation process having been completed, the Metronet brand and group of companies had ceased to exist.

== See also ==
- History of the London Underground
- Tube Lines, the other PPP consortium responsible for London Underground infrastructure from 2003 to 2010
