= London Pass =

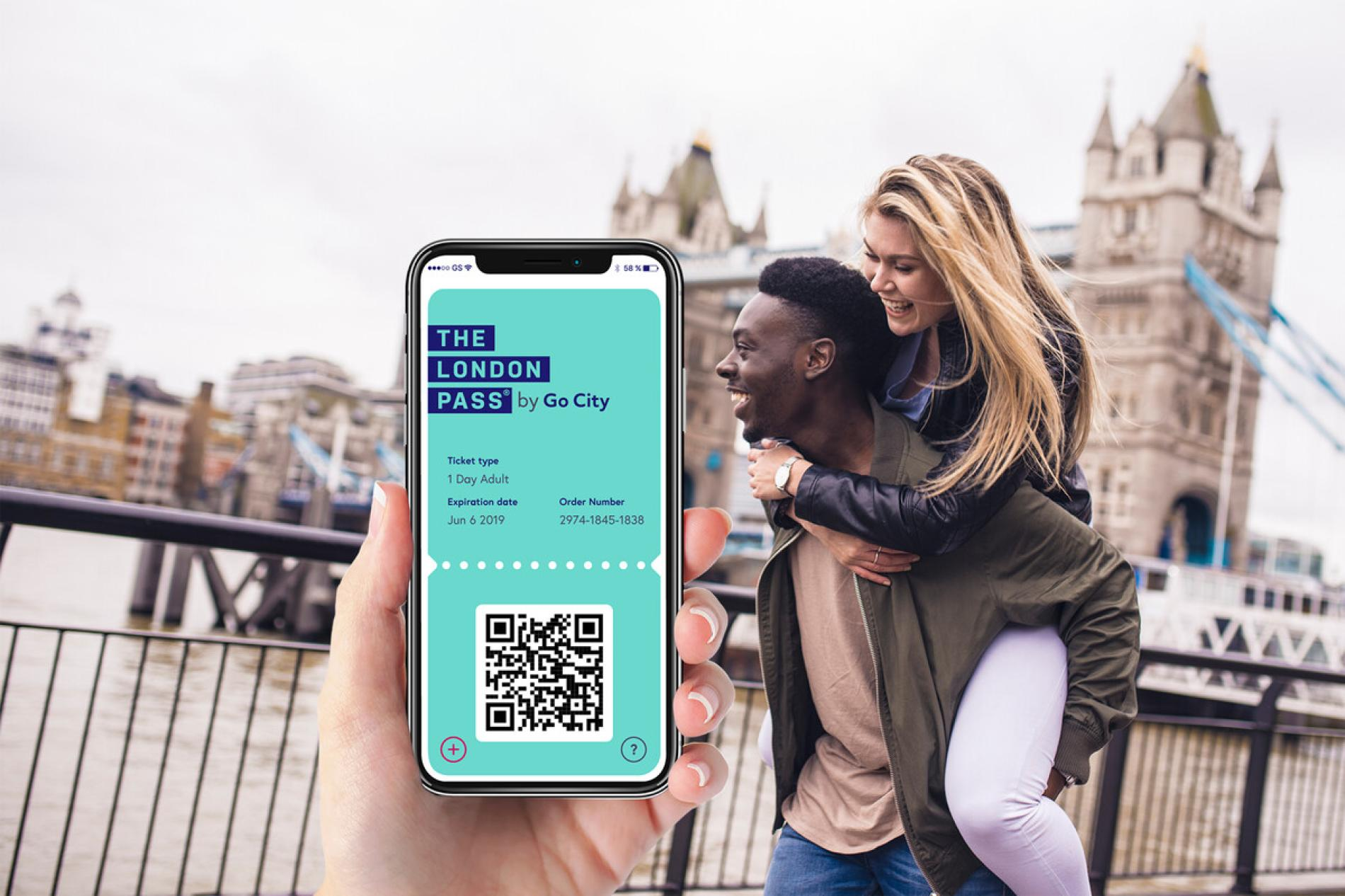

The London Pass is a sightseeing pass for tourists coming to London, the capital of United Kingdom. It consists of a smart card which entitles the holder to enter a number of tourist attractions in and around the London region having paid a set fee in advance. It is one of many such 'city passes' worldwide aimed at the international tourist market.

The pass comes in two basic forms: admissions only, or admissions plus Travelcard. The value any individual traveller or travellers derives from the pass depends on their own personal sightseeing preferences, and can be hard to determine.

The London Pass generally is available as a 1-day, 2-days, 3-days and 6-days pass that can be used within 12 months after purchasing it. This means, that tourists can order the pass before they travel. It becomes active as soon as the first site is visited. The time frame available for visiting with the pass is based on a calendar day, not on 24 hours.

== Attractions included on the London Pass ==
The pass includes entry to a number of attractions including:

- ArcelorMittal Orbit
- All Hallows by the Tower
- Apsley House
- Benjamin Franklin House
- British Music Experience
- The Cartoon Museum
- Charles Dickens Museum
- Chelsea FC Stadium Tour
- Chelsea Physic Garden
- Chislehurst Caves
- Churchill War Rooms
- Cutty Sark
- Eltham Palace
- Estorick Collection of Modern Italian Art
- Eton College
- Fan Museum
- Guards Museum
- Hampton Court Palace
- Handel House Museum
- HMS Belfast
- Imperial War Museum
- Jewel Tower
- Kensington Palace
- Kew Gardens
- The London Bridge Experience
- London Canal Museum
- London Transport Museum
- London Wetland Centre
- London Zoo
- National Gallery
- National Maritime Museum
- National Portrait Gallery
- Royal Air Force Museum
- Royal Albert Hall
- Royal Mews
- Royal Observatory Greenwich
- Shakespeare's Globe Theatre
- Southwark Cathedral
- St. Paul’s Cathedral
- Tate Britain
- Tate Modern
- The Banqueting House
- The Monument
- Tower Bridge Exhibition
- Tower of London
- The Postal Museum
- Wellington Arch
- Westminster Abbey
- Wimbledon Lawn Tennis Museum
- Windsor Castle

Each of these attractions has a London Pass machine at the ticket desk. An attendant scans the London Pass through this machine and allows the holder entry to the attraction without additional payment.

== See also ==
- Tourism in London
- Transport in London
- Explorer Pass
- All-inclusive Pass
