= Transport in London =

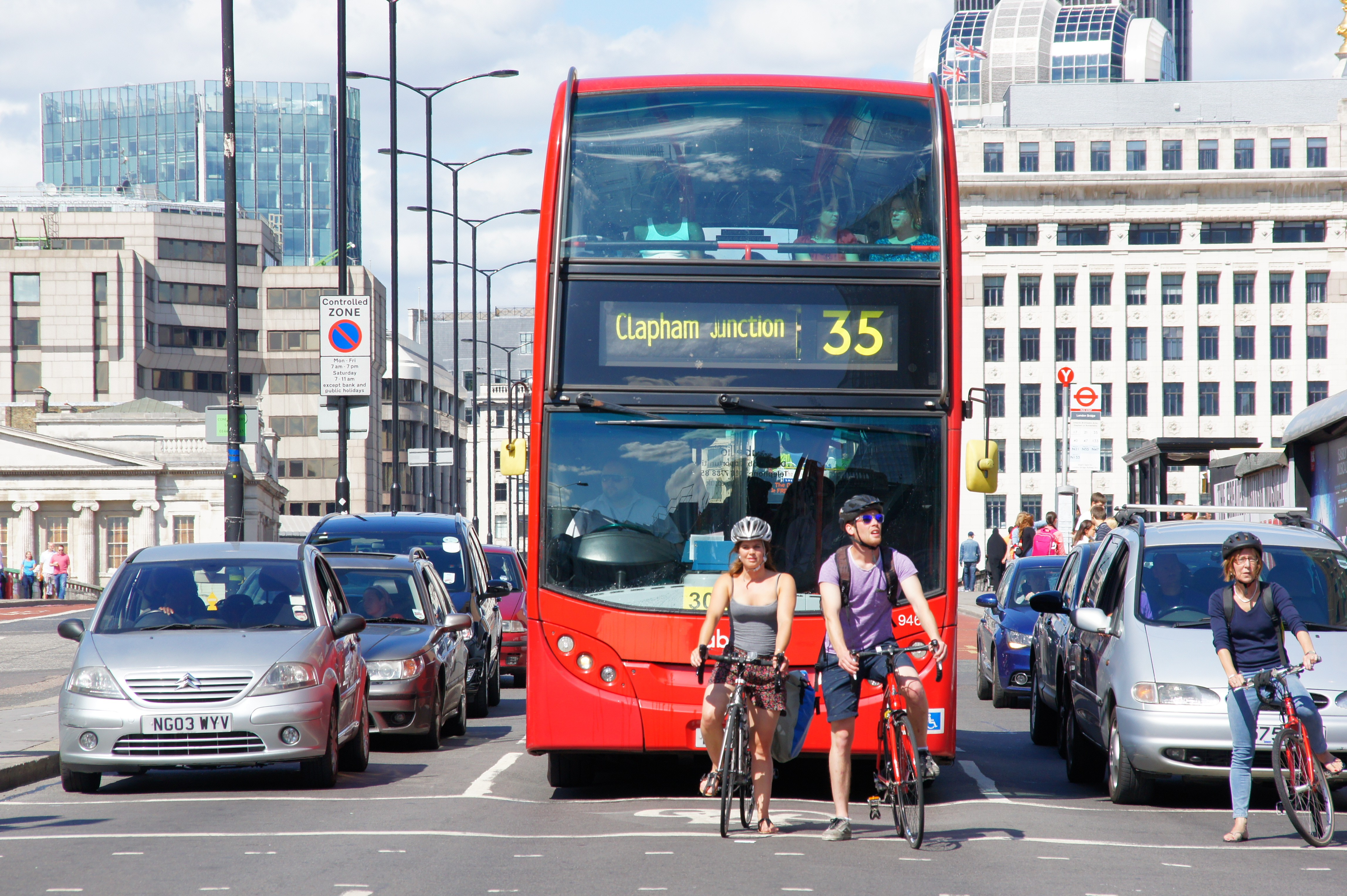
- Cars, bikes and a double-decker bus on London Bridge

Overview
- Locale: London and surrounding regions
- Transit type: Rapid transit, commuter rail, light metro, light rail, buses, private automobile, Taxicab, bicycle, pedestrian

London has an extensive and developed transport network which includes both public and private services. Journeys made on its integrated transport network account for 37% of London's journeys while private services accounted for 36% of journeys, walking 24% and cycling 2%, according to numbers from 2017. London's public transport network serves as the central hub for the United Kingdom in rail, air and road transport.

Public transport services are dominated by the city's executive agency for transport, Transport for London (TfL). TfL controls the majority of public transport, including the Underground, Buses, Tramlink, the Docklands Light Railway, London River Services, Elizabeth line and the London Overground.

Other rail services are either franchised to train operating companies by the Department for Transport (DfT) or, like Eurostar and Heathrow Express, operated on an open-access basis. TfL also controls most major roads in London, but not minor roads. In addition, there are several independent airports serving London, including Heathrow, the busiest airport in Europe.

== History ==
Management of London Transport 1933–2000
| Dates | Organisation | Overseen by |
|---|---|---|
| 1933–1947 | London Passenger Transport Board | London County Council |
| 1948–1962 | London Transport Executive | British Transport Commission |
| 1963–1969 | London Transport Board | Minister of Transport |
| 1970–1984 | London Transport Executive (Greater London only) | Greater London Council |
| 1970–1986 | London Country Bus Services (Green Line only) | National Bus Company |
| 1984–2000 | London Regional Transport | Secretary of State for Transport |
| 2000(2003)–present | Transport for London | Mayor of London |

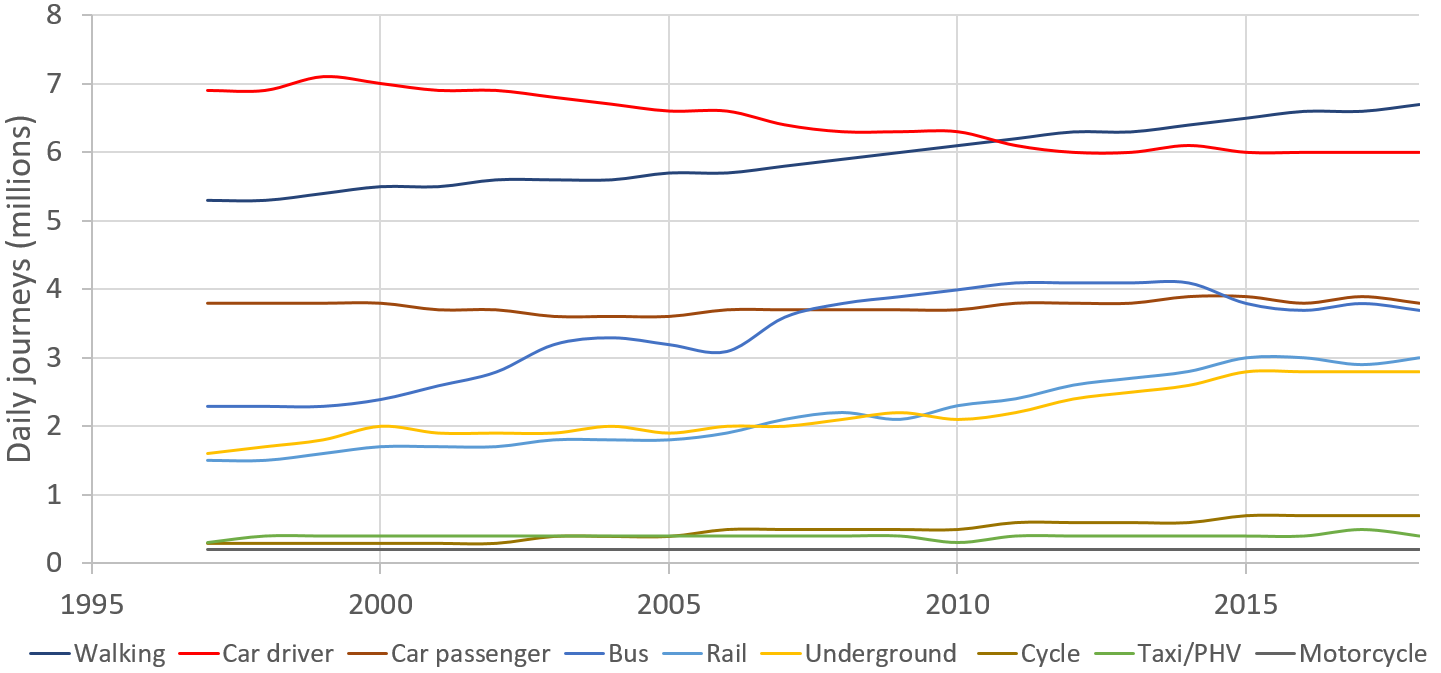
Journeys in Greater London by mode from 1997 to 2018

Early public transport in London began with horse-drawn omnibus services in 1829, which were gradually replaced by the first motor omnibuses in 1902. Over the years the private companies which began these services amalgamated with the London General Omnibus Company (LGOC) to form a unified bus service. The Underground Electric Railways Company of London, also formed in 1902, unified the pioneering underground railway companies which built the London Underground; in 1912 the Underground Group took over the LGOC and in 1913 it also absorbed the London tramway companies. The Underground Group became part of the new London Passenger Transport Board (LPTB) on 1 July 1933, which also took over the Metropolitan Railway. Underground trains, Green Line coaches, trolleybuses and trams then began to operate as London Transport, although the name 'General' continued to be seen on buses and their timetables for a few months longer.

The London Transport name continued in use until 2000 (2003 on the Underground), although the political management of transport services changed several times. The LPTB oversaw transport from 1933 to 1947 until it was re-organised as the London Transport Executive (1948 to 1962). Responsibility for London Transport was subsequently taken over to the London Transport Board (1963 to 1969), the Greater London Council (1970 to 1984) and London Regional Transport (1984 to 2000/2003).

Following the privatisation of London bus services in 1986, bus services were spun off to a separate operation based on competitive tendering, London Buses. On 3 July 2000, as part of the formation of the new Greater London Authority, responsibility for most of London Transport was taken over by a new transport authority, Transport for London (TfL), which is the publicly owned transport corporation for the London region now.

However, because of the continuing controversy over public-private partnerships in connection with London Underground maintenance, the new GLA led by Mayor Ken Livingstone was not permitted to take control of the Underground until the PPP contracts had been signed. In the event, London Regional Transport continued in existence as the owner of London Underground Ltd until July 2003. London Regional Transport was wound up on 15 July.

== Metro and light rail ==
The radial form of the London railway network (light, heavy, and metro)

TfL operates three different railway systems across London. The largest is the London Underground, a rapid transit system operating on sub-surface lines and in deep-level "tube" lines. TfL also operates the Docklands Light Railway (DLR), an automated light metro system in the east of the city, and the Tramlink system.

The London Underground and the DLR account for 40 per cent of the journeys between Inner London and Outer London, making them the most highly used systems in all of London. These three systems extend to most points of London, creating a comprehensive and extensive system. One major area missed by these systems is South London, which is dominated by a large suburban rail network.

=== London Underground ===
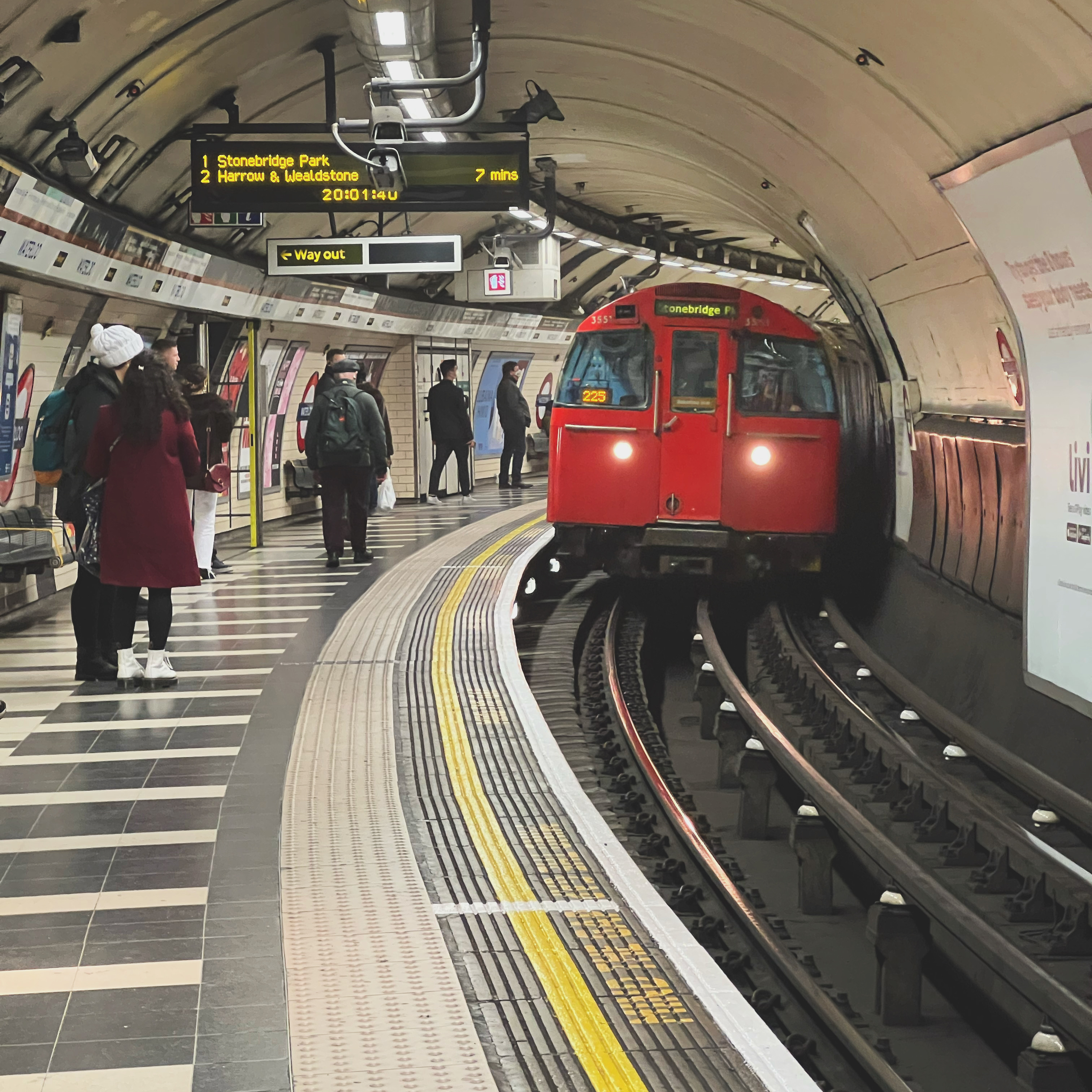
A London Underground Bakerloo line train entering into Waterloo station

Colloquially known as the Tube, the London Underground was the first rapid transit system in the world, having begun operations in 1863. More than 3 million passengers travel on the Underground every day, amounting to over 1 billion passenger journeys per year for the first time in 2006. The Underground has 11 lines, most of which connect the suburbs to Central London and together form a dense network in central London, linking major railway stations, central business areas and icons. The Underground serves North London much more extensively than South London. This is the result of a combination of unfavourable geology, historical competition from surface railways and the historical geography of London which was focused to the north of the River Thames. South London is served primarily by surface railways (the majority of London Underground's route length is actually on the surface rather than in tunnel).

Carrying nearly 50% of London's commuters, the Tube is the most heavily used mode of public transport in the area.

=== Docklands Light Railway ===
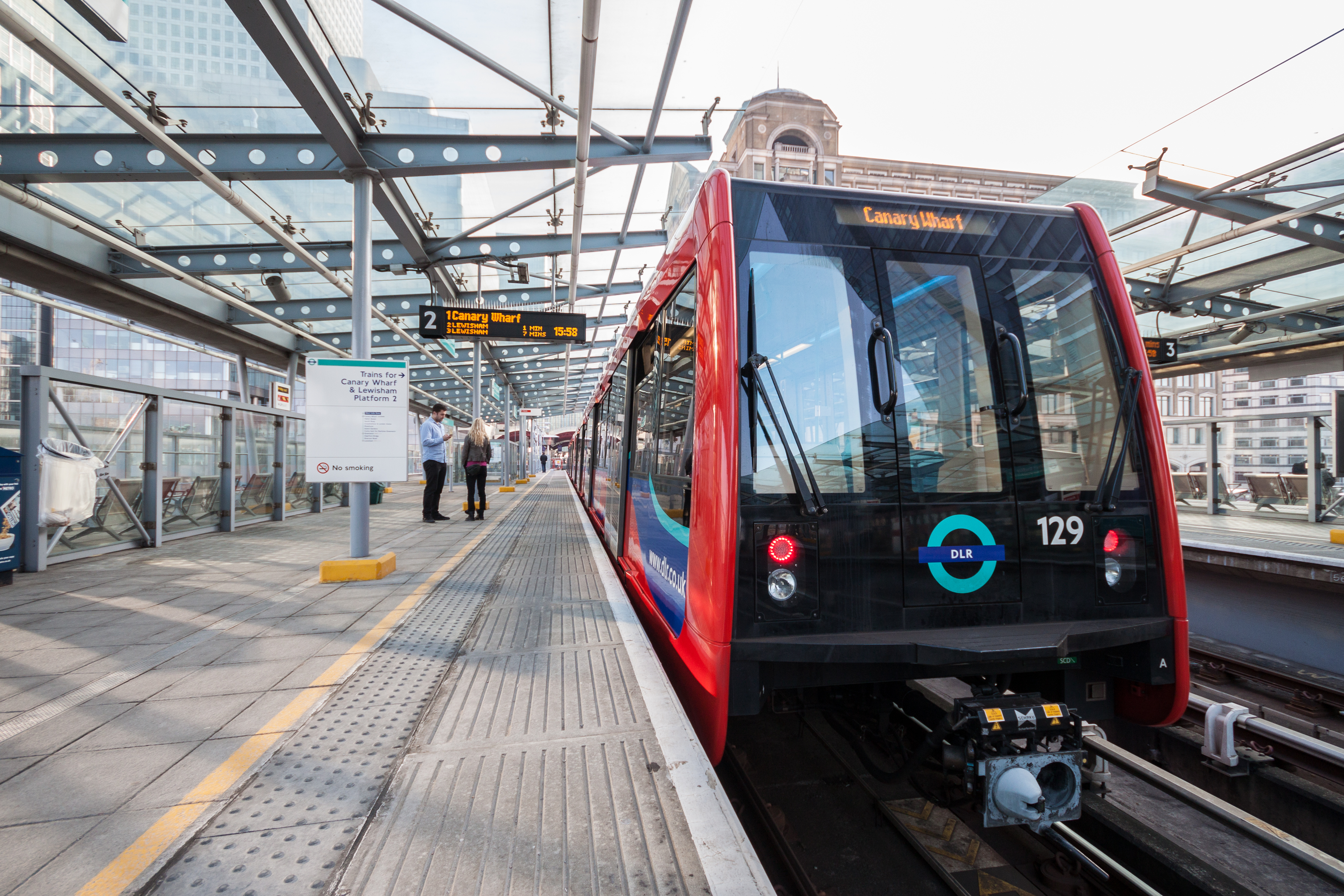
An automated Docklands Light Railway train at West India Quay, in the Canary Wharf financial district

The Docklands Light Railway (DLR) is an automated light metro system serving the Docklands area of east London. It complements the London Underground, using the same fares system and having a number of interchanges with it.

The DLR serves over 101 million passengers a year and is an essential piece of infrastructure to East London. The DLR's most heavily used stations are Bank, Canary Wharf, Canning Town, Lewisham and Woolwich Arsenal.

Partly thanks to the success of Canary Wharf, the system has expanded several times and now has five main branches connecting the Isle of Dogs and Royal Docks to each other and to the City of London, Stratford, Woolwich and Lewisham south of the river. It also serves London City Airport and Stratford International. A further extension to Dagenham Dock was proposed, but later cancelled by Mayor of London Boris Johnson in 2008. The Dagenham Dock extension has featured in later plans, but its status is uncertain. Further extensions are under consideration.

=== Tramlink ===
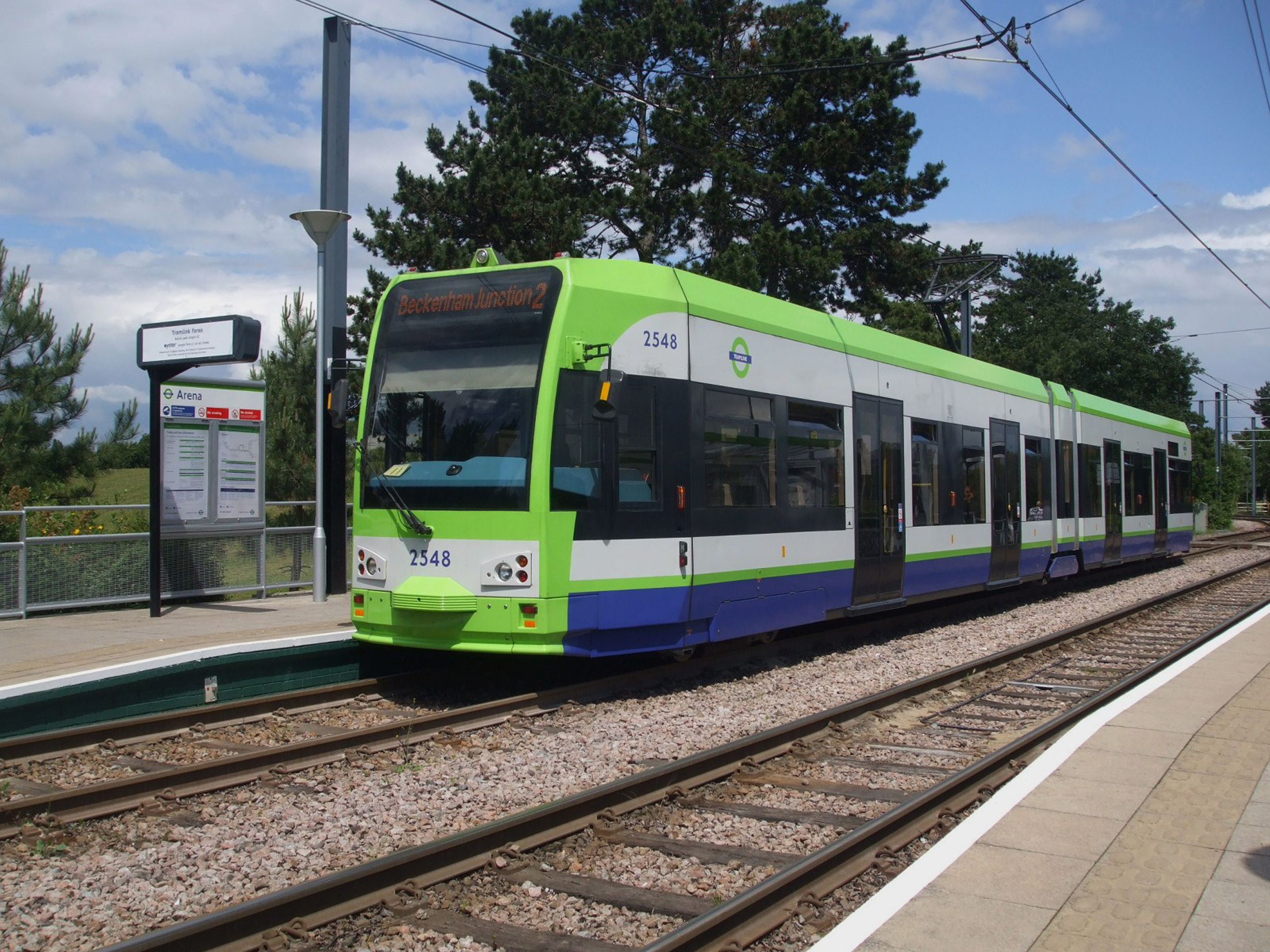
A Tramlink tram bound for Beckenham Junction stopping at Arena station

The Tramlink is a tram and light rail system serving Croydon and surrounding areas. It operates in the boroughs of Bromley, Croydon and Merton and Sutton and has 39 stations. In 2011, it carried over 28 million passengers, up from 18 million in 2001.

The network consists of 39 stops along 28 km (17 mi) of track, on a mixture of street track shared with other traffic, dedicated track in public roads, and off-street track consisting of new rights-of-way, former railway lines, and one right-of-way where the Tramlink track runs parallel to a third rail-electrified Network Rail line.

The system runs on its own right of way, mixed use rails and with street traffic. The network has connections with the London Underground, the London Overground and the National Rail system. There are several extensions planned for the system, such as expanding its coverage and further integrating it into the Underground system.

== Heavy rail ==
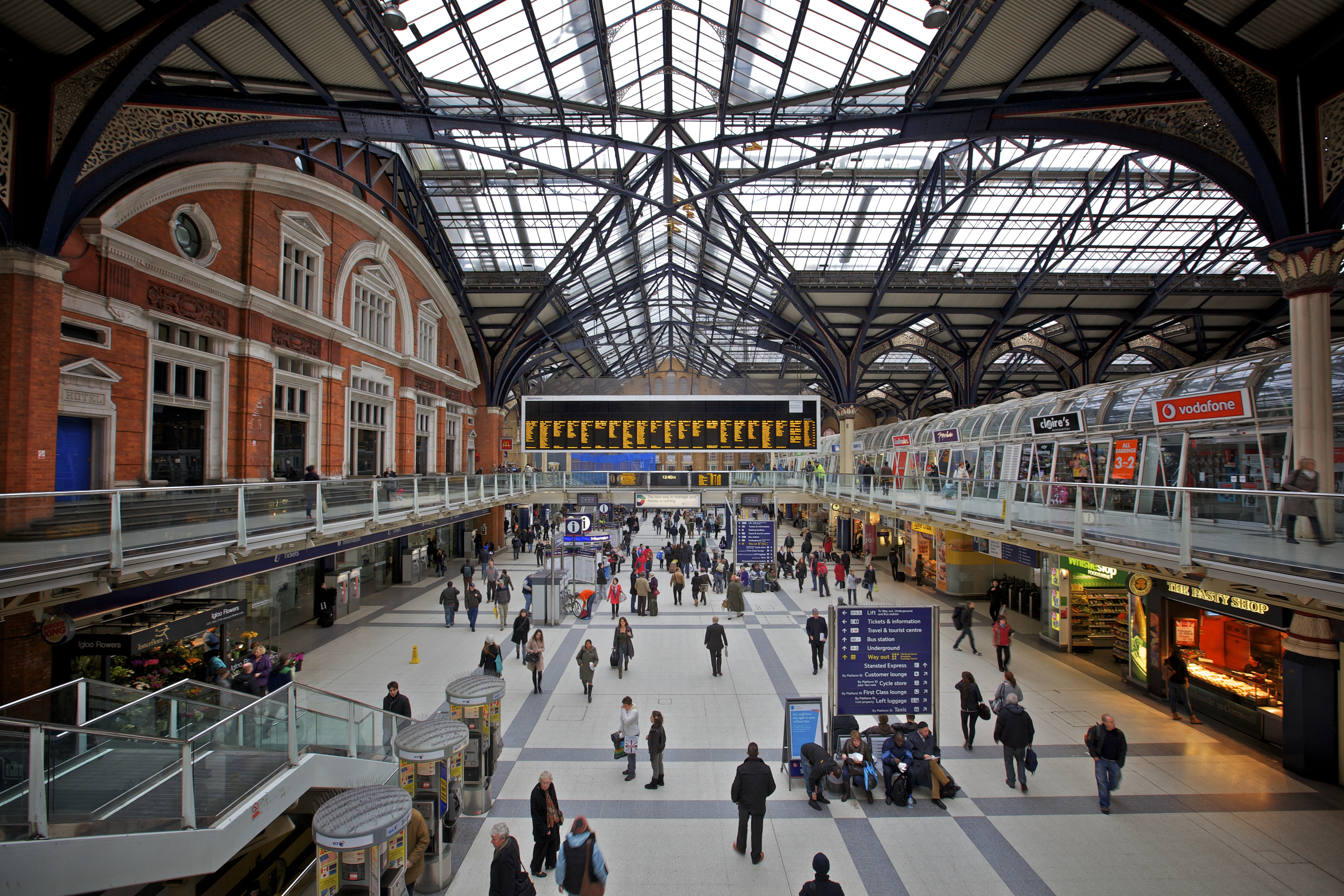
London Liverpool Street is the busiest railway station in London and the UK, with nearly 100 million entries and exits from the station every year.

London is the focal point of the British railway network, with 18 major stations providing a combination of suburban, intercity, airport and international services; the stations are a mix of termini and through stations. Most areas of the city not served by the Underground or DLR are served by suburban heavy rail services into one of these stations. These suburban rail services are not part of Transport for London (apart from London Overground and Elizabeth line) but are owned and operated by a number of private rail firms and use TfL's Oyster card system.

The terminal (only) stations are Cannon Street, Charing Cross, Euston, Fenchurch Street, King's Cross, Liverpool Street, Marylebone, Moorgate, Paddington, Victoria and Waterloo. Paddington and Liverpool Street do have Elizabeth line services going through them.

The through stations are Waterloo East, City Thameslink, Old Street, and Vauxhall. The 'mixed' stations are St Pancras, Blackfriars and London Bridge. London is also linked by rail to mainland Europe by High Speed 1 (HS1) through the Channel Tunnel Rail Link. High-speed Eurostar trains serve Paris, Brussels and Amsterdam central station. Eurostar's London terminus is at St Pancras International and the HS1 route passes through Stratford International and two stations in the county of Kent, Ashford International and Ebbsfleet International.

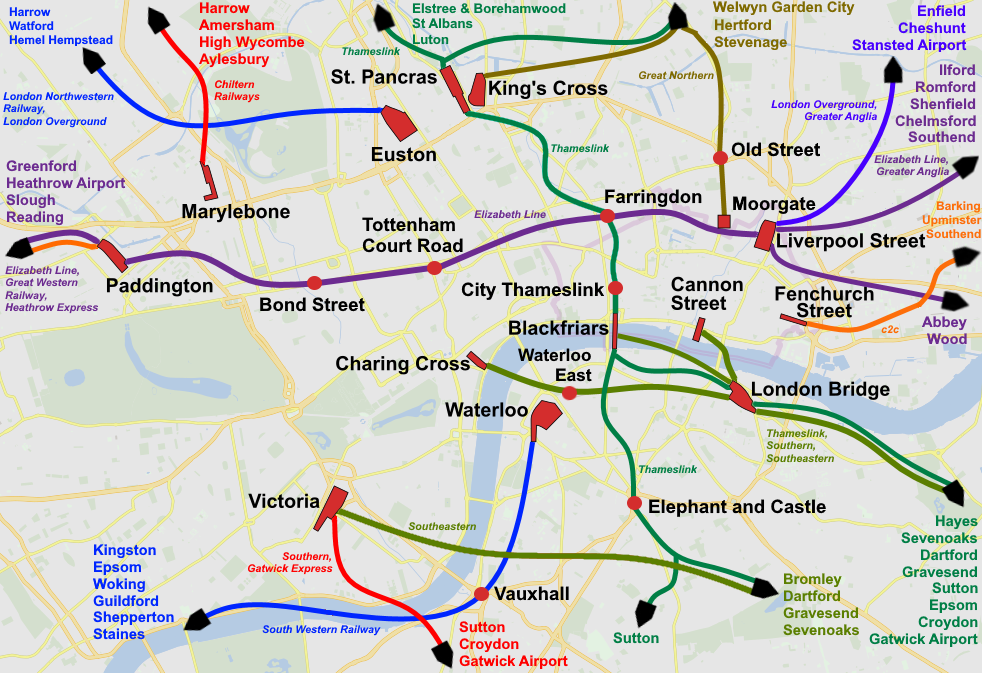
Stations, lines and termini of commuter suburban and regional railways in central London as of 2022 (excluding international services)

=== Suburban and regional ===
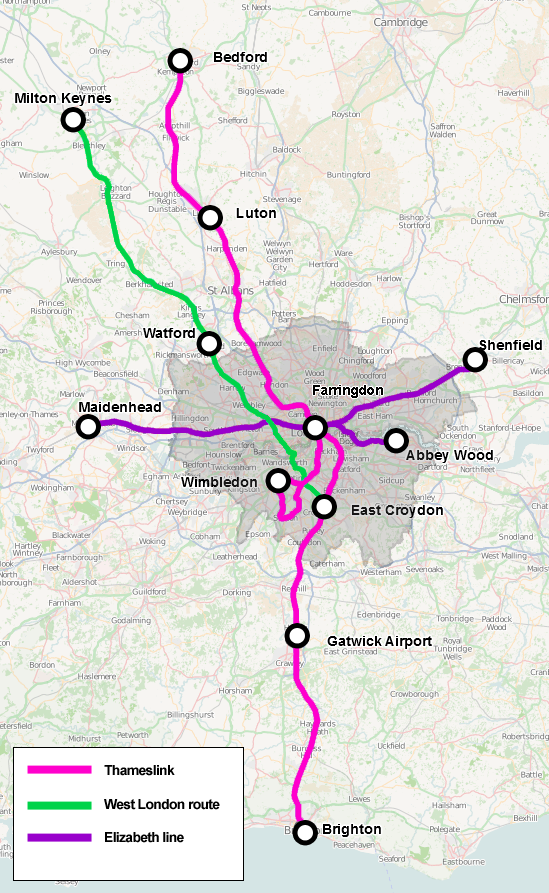
Cross-London rail routes

London is the centre of an extensive radial commuter railway network which, along with Paris, is the busiest and largest in Europe, comprising 368 railway stations in the London fare zones, serving Greater London and the surrounding metropolitan area. Each terminus is associated with commuter services from a particular segment of this area. The majority of commuters to central London (about 80% of 1.1 million) arrive by either the Underground (400,000 daily) or by surface railway into these termini (860,000 daily).

For historical reasons, London's commuter rail network is arranged in a radial form, and as a result the majority of services entering London terminate at one of the terminal stations around the edge of the city centre. Two long-distance National Rail lines currently go across London: the Thameslink route runs between the more distant towns of Bedford in the north and Brighton on the south coast, passing through the City of London north-south, London suburbs as well as Luton Airport Parkway and Gatwick Airport, while the Elizabeth line passes through the city east–west and is operated by MTR Elizabeth line running between Reading in the west and Shenfield in the east. A major expansion of the Thameslink route is planned 2013–18, in which a number of existing regional rail services will be redirected via the cross-London Thameslink corridor.

Constantly increasing pressure on the commuter rail systems and on the Underground to disperse passengers from the busy terminals led to the multibillion-pound Crossrail project to develop the Elizabeth line. When it opened in May 2022, the Elizabeth line added further cross-London line passing through Paddington and Liverpool Street. New or upgraded stations have been provided at key city centre locations, linking to the Underground.

While most stations in central London are termini, there are a few notable exceptions. London Bridge station has several through lines to the more central termini at Cannon Street and Charing Cross, and trains to the latter also call at Waterloo East, linked to Waterloo by a footbridge. London Bridge's through platforms are also used by the Thameslink services of Govia Thameslink Railway, which cross the city centre, calling at Blackfriars, City Thameslink, Farringdon and St Pancras.

==== London Overground ====
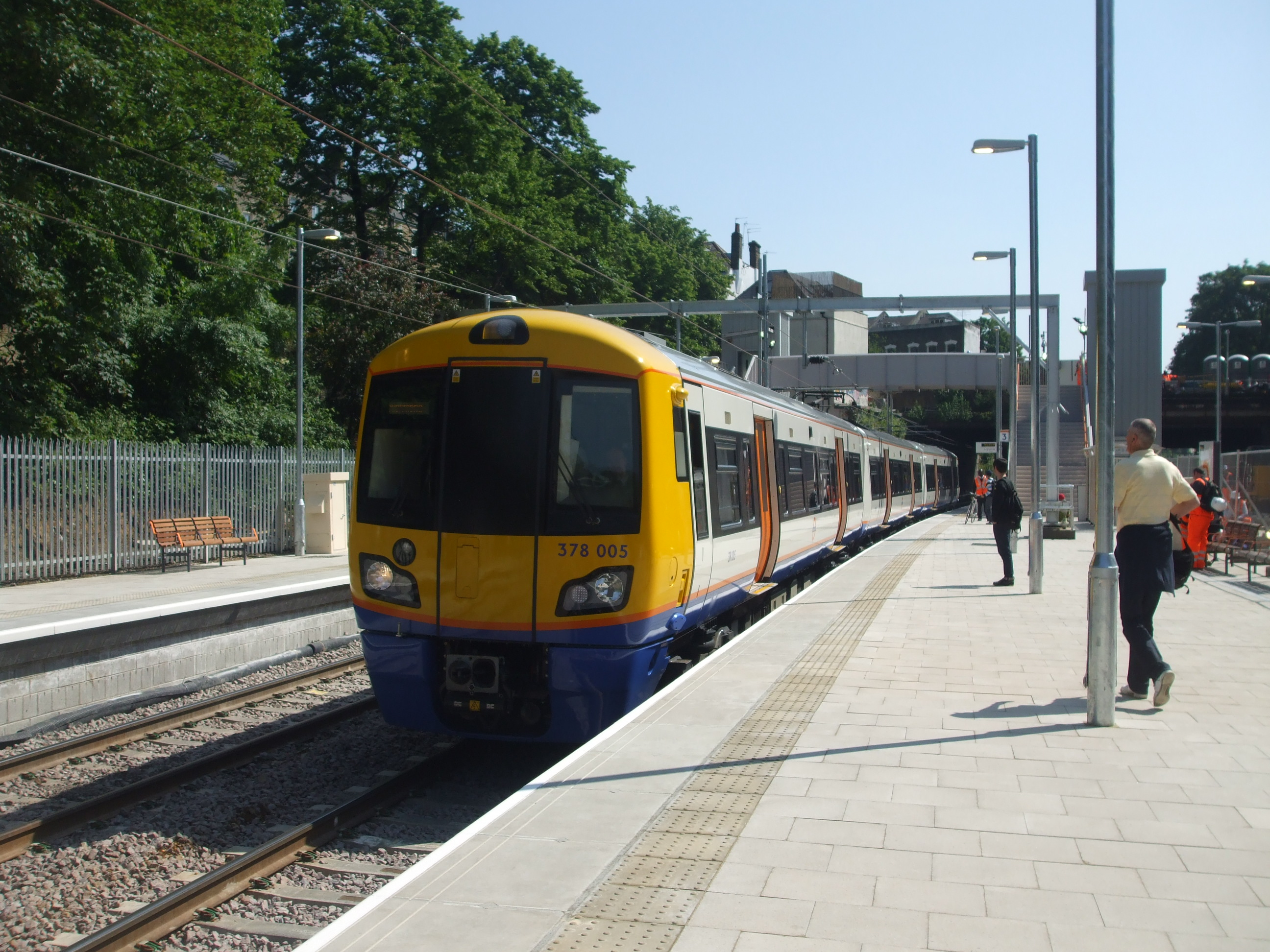
London Overground running a Mildmay line service on the North London line. This forms part of London's orbital route.

In addition to London's radial lines and cross-London routes, there are also several orbital National Rail lines connecting peripheral inner-London suburbs. These lines have been under the management of TfL since November 2007 and are operated by private contract under the London Overground brand. This commuter transport is operated as a rapid transit system with high-frequency services around a circular route with radial branch lines and is designed to reduce use of the inner-city Tube network by allowing commuters to travel across London without going through the central Zone 1.

London Overground was formed by joining a series of existing railway lines to form a circular route around the city. It incorporates the oldest part of the Underground's history, the Thames Tunnel under the River Thames, which was completed in 1843 and is now part of the East London line, on which parts of the Windrush line service are run. The services operated by London Overground are:

- The Mildmay line, which starts from Stratford and goes across North London before branching off in two directions via Willesden Junction. One branches off to Richmond in the west and the other branches off to Clapham Junction to connect with the Windrush line.
- The Windrush line service starts at Highbury and Islington interchanging with the Mildmay line, running alongside it before diverging off at Dalston Junction where it runs through East London at its "core" before splitting at Surrey Quays to one of 3 paths. The first heads to Wandsworth Road where it again splits off into one of two paths. One of them goes to Clapham Junction where it connects with a terminus of the Mildmay line. The other branch goes for a very limited service to Battersea Park. The second branch from Surrey Quays goes directly to New Cross; with the final branch from Surrey Quays goes to Sydenham, where there is a further split to Crystal Palace and to West Croydon.
- The Suffragette line, which links inner North London to the northeastern suburbs, and runs from Gospel Oak to Barking Riverside.
- The inner-suburban Lioness line from Euston to Watford Junction.
- Weaver line services from Liverpool Street to Chingford, Enfield Town and Cheshunt via Hackney Downs.
- The Liberty line, which runs from Romford to Upminster via Emerson Park.

==== Airport services ====
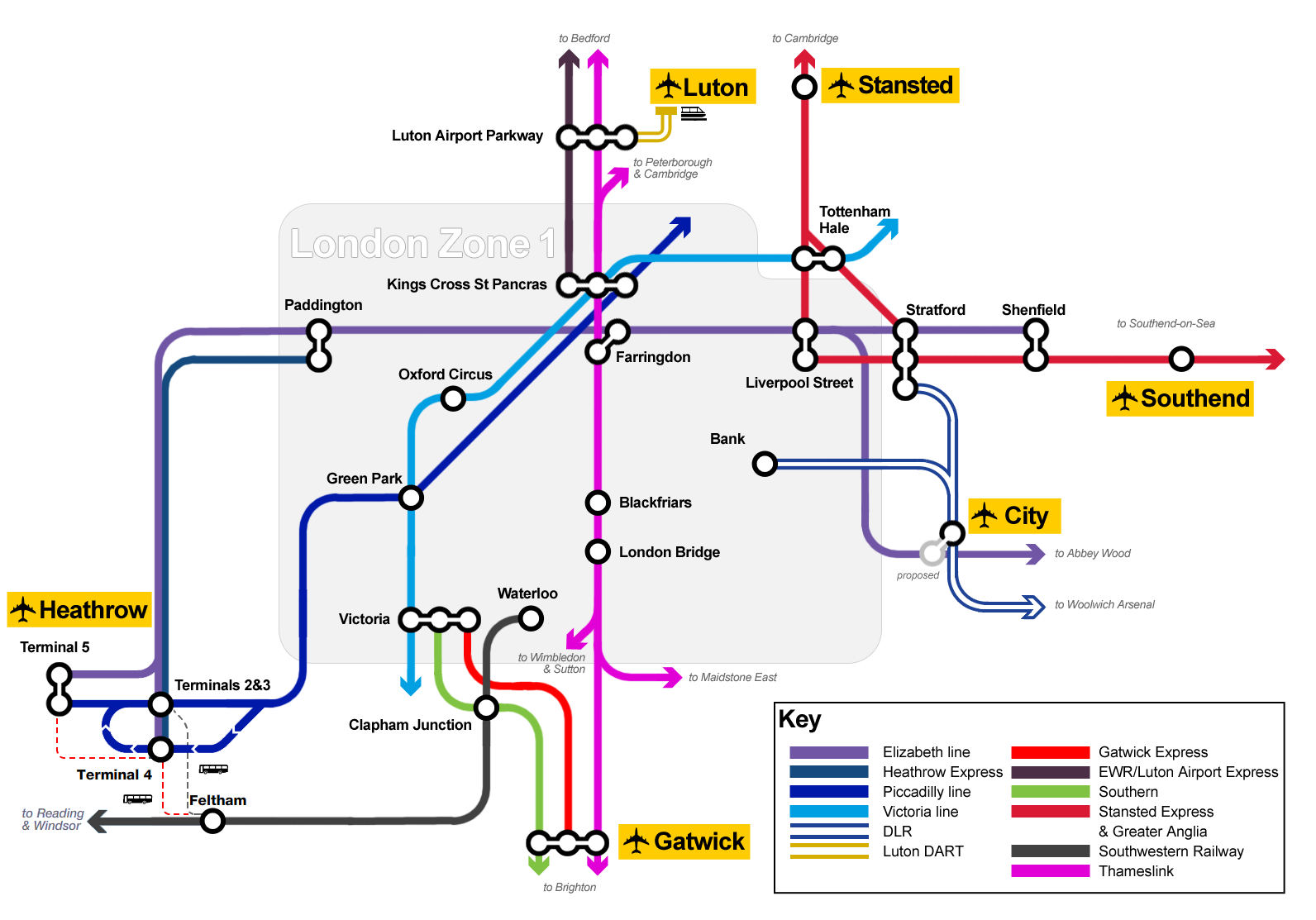
Map of rail and Tube links to London Airports

Heathrow, Gatwick and Stansted airports are served by dedicated train services, and are also served by standard commuter services. The Heathrow Express service from Paddington is provided by the airport operator, Heathrow Airport Holdings, whilst the Gatwick Express from Victoria and Stansted Express from Liverpool Street are provided by franchised train operating companies.

Airport transfer services by rail in London
| Airport | Train operator | Central London station | Notes |
|---|---|---|---|
| City | DLR | Bank/Tower Gateway | |
| Gatwick | Gatwick Express | Victoria | Non-stop service, sub brand of Govia Thameslink Railway |
| Gatwick | Southern | Victoria | Semi-fast and fast service via Clapham Junction |
| Gatwick | Thameslink | St Pancras/Farringdon/City Thameslink/Blackfriars/London Bridge | Thameslink route service |
| Heathrow | Heathrow Express | Paddington | Non-stop service between Central London and the Airport, serves Terminals 2 & 3, then terminates at Terminal 5 |
| Heathrow | London Underground | Several including Earl's Court and King's Cross St Pancras | Piccadilly line service |
| Heathrow | Elizabeth line | Paddington, Bond Street, Tottenham Court Road, Farringdon, Liverpool Street | Stopping service, formerly Heathrow Connect |
| Luton | Thameslink | St Pancras/Farringdon/City Thameslink/Blackfriars/London Bridge/Elephant & Castle | Thameslink route service |
| Luton | East Midlands Railway | St Pancras International | Regional services from St Pancras to Corby |
| Stansted | Stansted Express | Liverpool Street | Limited stop service, sub brand of Greater Anglia |
| Southend | Greater Anglia | Liverpool Street | |

==== Operators ====
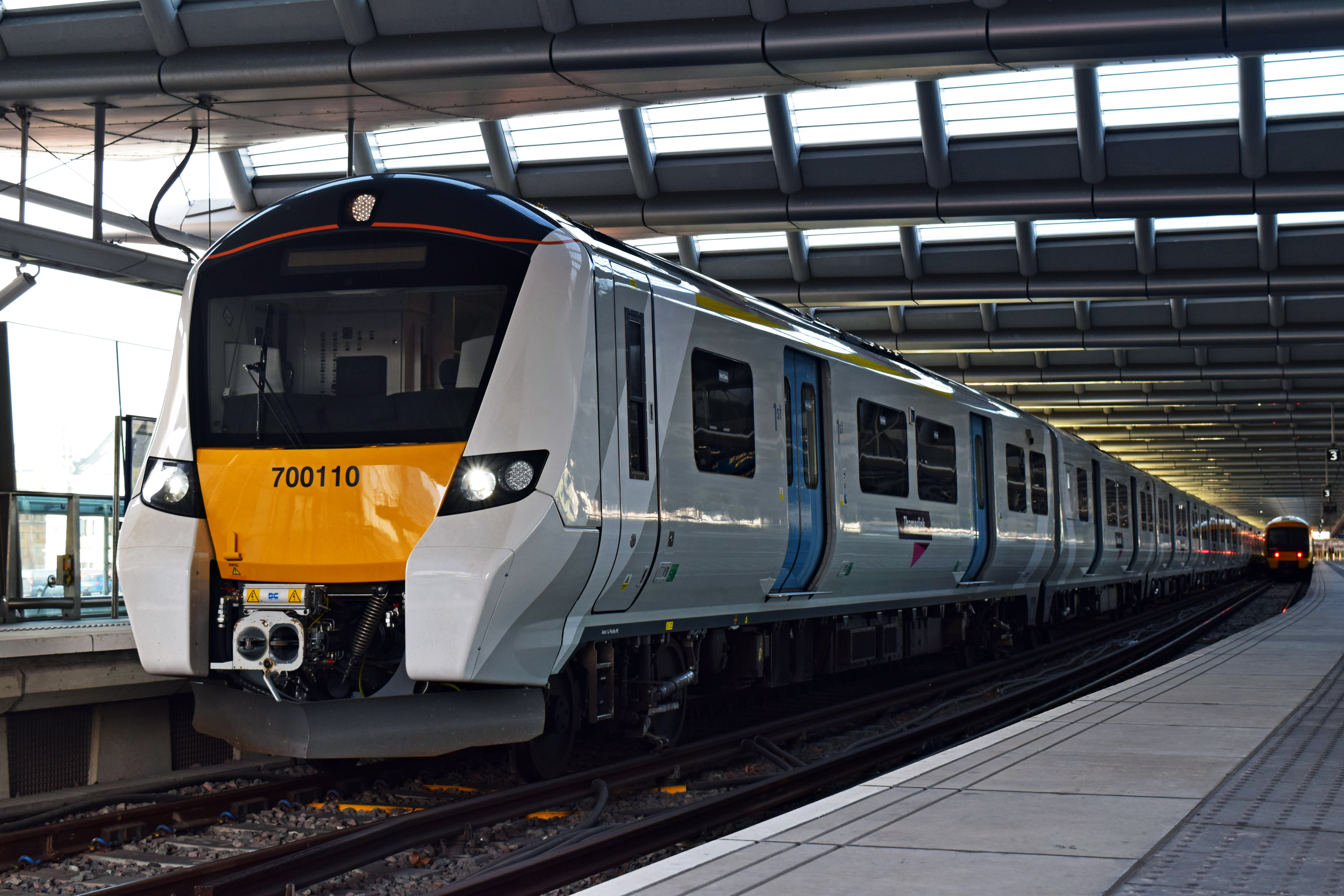
A Thameslink train on a cross-London route at Blackfriars station in central London

Unlike the Underground, which is a single system owned and operated by Transport for London, National Rail lines in and around London are run by a number of separate train operating companies (TOCs) under contract with the Department for Transport. This results from the privatisation of British Rail in the 1990s which split the former state railway operator British Rail into a number of smaller franchises in order to increase competition and allow railways to operate in a free market. This structure has now been abandoned in favour of operating contracts, for which the commercial risk is taken by the government. The former franchises were abolished in September 2020.

Among the firms operating passenger services in London, some are owned by foreign companies or by state-owned railways of other European countries. London Overground is operated by a private company under contract to Transport for London, as is Docklands Light Railway. Heathrow Express is not part of the National Rail contract system, being an open-access operator instead.

Train operators in London
| Train operator | Franchise/services | Parent company/owner |
|---|---|---|
| c2c | Essex Thameside – local and regional/commuter services from Fenchurch Street to East London and South Essex | DfT Operator |
| Chiltern Railways | London to Aylesbury Line – local and regional/commuter services from Marylebone to North West London, Buckinghamshire | Arriva |
| First Rail London | London Overground metro service across London | FirstGroup on behalf of TfL as a concessionary contract |
| GTS Rail Operations | Elizabeth line cross-London regional / commuter service from Reading and Heathrow Airport in the west, through the centre of the city to Stratford and Shenfield in the east | Go-Ahead Group, Tokyo Metro and Sumitomo Corporation on behalf of TfL as a concessionary contract |
| Greater Thameslink Railway | Thameslink Southern & Great Northern franchise – operate under the Gatwick Express, Great Northern, Southern, and Thameslink brands from King's Cross, Moorgate, Blackfriars, London Bridge and Victoria to North London, South London, Hertfordshire, Cambridgeshire, Bedfordshire, Kent and Sussex, also operate cross city services via the Thameslink route | DfT Operator |
| Great Western Railway | Greater Western franchise – local and regional/commuter services from Paddington to West London and the Thames Valley; Heathrow Express Non-stop service from Paddington to Heathrow Airport (infrastructure owned by Heathrow Airport Holdings) | FirstGroup |
| Greater Anglia | East Anglia franchise – local and regional/commuter services from Liverpool Street to Essex, Hertfordshire and Cambridgeshire, also operate the Stansted Express | DfT Operator |
| London Northwestern Railway | Local and regional/commuter services from Euston to Hertfordshire, Buckinghamshire and Northamptonshire, Warwickshire, Staffordshire and Birmingham | DfT Operator |
| South Western Railway | South Western franchise – local services from Waterloo to South West London and regional/commuter services to Surrey, Hampshire, Dorset & Berkshire | DfT Operator |
| Southeastern | South Eastern franchise – local metro services across South East London and commuter and regional services from Victoria, Charing Cross, Cannon Street, Blackfriars and high speed services from St Pancras to Kent | DfT Operator on behalf of Department for Transport |

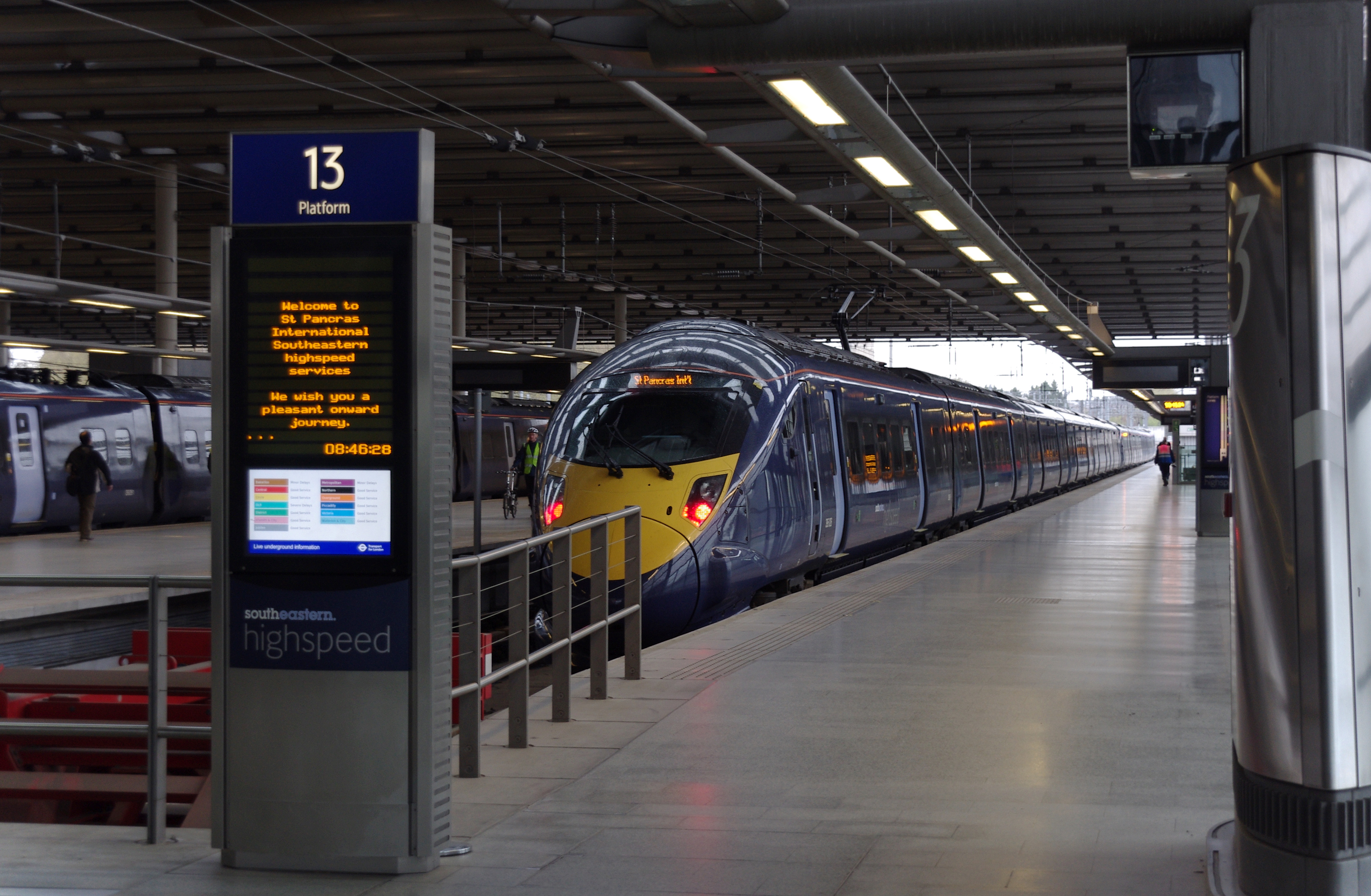
St Pancras station is one of London's main domestic and international transport hubs providing both commuter rail and high-speed rail services across England.

=== National InterCity ===
Long-distance intercity services are provided at some London rail termini. Because the termini and intercity routes were largely built by competing companies, many termini serve cities in overlapping regions or different parts of the same region:

- London Euston for the West Midlands, Wales, North West England and Scotland
- London King's Cross for the East Midlands, Yorkshire and the Humber, North East England and Scotland
- London Paddington for South West England, the West Midlands and Wales
- London St Pancras for the East Midlands, Yorkshire and the Humber and Kent
- London Liverpool Street for East of England
- London Waterloo for trains to the south coast and South West England.

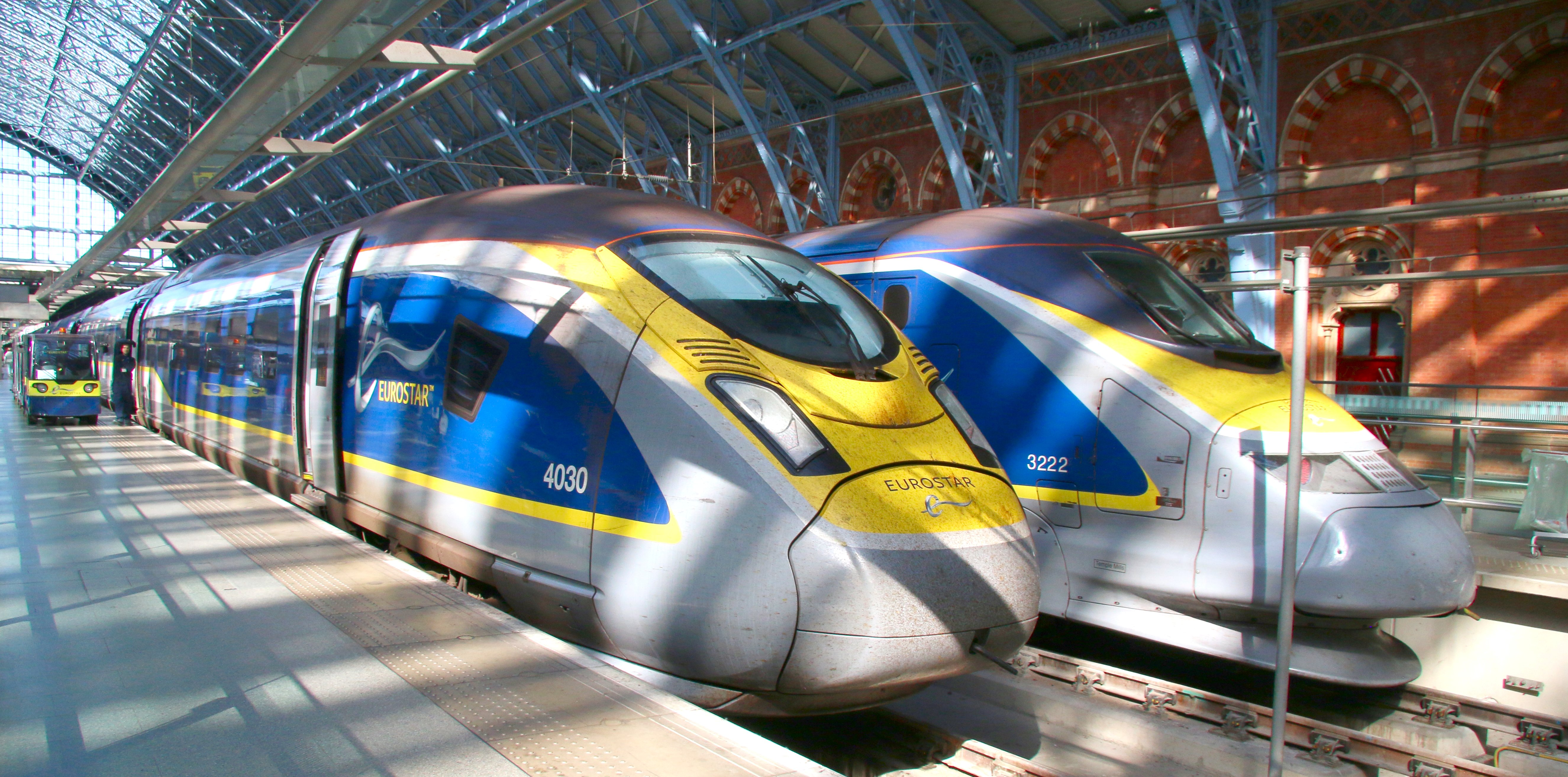
Eurostar high speed trains at St Pancras station

=== International ===
St Pancras provides international Eurostar services via the Channel Tunnel to cities including Paris, Brussels, Lyon and Marseille, with journeys to Paris in around 2 hours 15 minutes and to Brussels in around 1 hour 50 minutes. Journeys have also started to Amsterdam.

It is also possible to purchase combined train and ferry tickets on the Dutchflyer service to the Netherlands as well as the Irish Ferries service to the Republic of Ireland.

== Ticketing ==
The TfL Oyster card electronic ticket

London commuters mostly gain access to public transport services in London by using one of the inter-modal travel tickets provided by Transport for London. Oyster card is a credit-card-sized electronic ticket which offers almost unlimited use on the London Underground, London Overground, Docklands Light Railway, Tramlink, London Buses and National Rail services in the Greater London area. Commuters entering London from further afield may rely on the older paper Travelcard (combined with a National Rail ticket) which offers the same inter-modal access but is valid at the regional railway stations not yet equipped to offer electronic ticketing. Oyster card is generally not valid outside the London fare zones or on certain airport express services.

Both Travelcard and Oyster card fares are calculated by using a system of fare zones which divides London's transport network into concentric circles numbered 1–6. Individual transport operators may also offer their own ticketing and fare tariffs for travel on one mode of transport.

The London Pass offers tourists visiting London a combination of the Travelcard and admissions to a number of tourist attractions for a set fee in advance.

== Roads ==
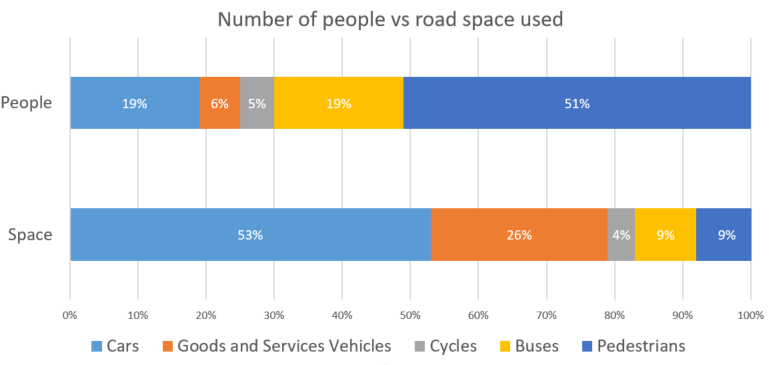
Numbers of people using different transport types in the City of London in 2017 against the road space used by that type

London has a hierarchy of roads ranging from major radial and orbital trunk roads down to minor "side streets". At the top level are motorways and grade-separated dual carriageways, supplemented by non-grade-separated urban dual carriageways, major single carriageway roads, local distributor roads and small local streets.

Most of the streets of central London were laid out before cars were invented, and London's road network is often congested. Attempts to tackle this go back at least to the 1740s, when the New Road was built through the fields north of the city; it is now just another congested central London thoroughfare. In the late 19th and early 20th centuries, new wide roads such as Victoria Embankment, Shaftesbury Avenue and Kingsway were created. In the 1920s and 1930s a series of new radial roads, such as the Western Avenue and Eastern Avenue, were constructed in the new suburban outskirts of London, but little was done in the congested central area.

A 1938 report, The Highway Development Survey, by Sir Charles Bressey and Sir Edwin Lutyens for the Ministry of Transport and Sir Patrick Abercrombie's 1943 County of London Plan and 1944 Greater London Plan all recommended the construction of many miles of new roads and the improvement of existing routes and junctions; but little was done to implement the recommendations. In the 1960s the Greater London Council prepared a drastic plan for a network of London Ringways including the construction of the London Motorway Box which would have involved massive demolition and huge cost to bring motorways into the heart of the city. Resistance from central government over the costs, and campaigns of objections from local residents, caused the cancellation of most of the plans in 1973. By the end of the 20th century policy swung towards a preference for public transport improvements, although the 118-mile (190 km) M25 orbital motorway was constructed between 1973 and 1986 to provide a route for traffic to bypass the London urban area.

=== Major routes ===
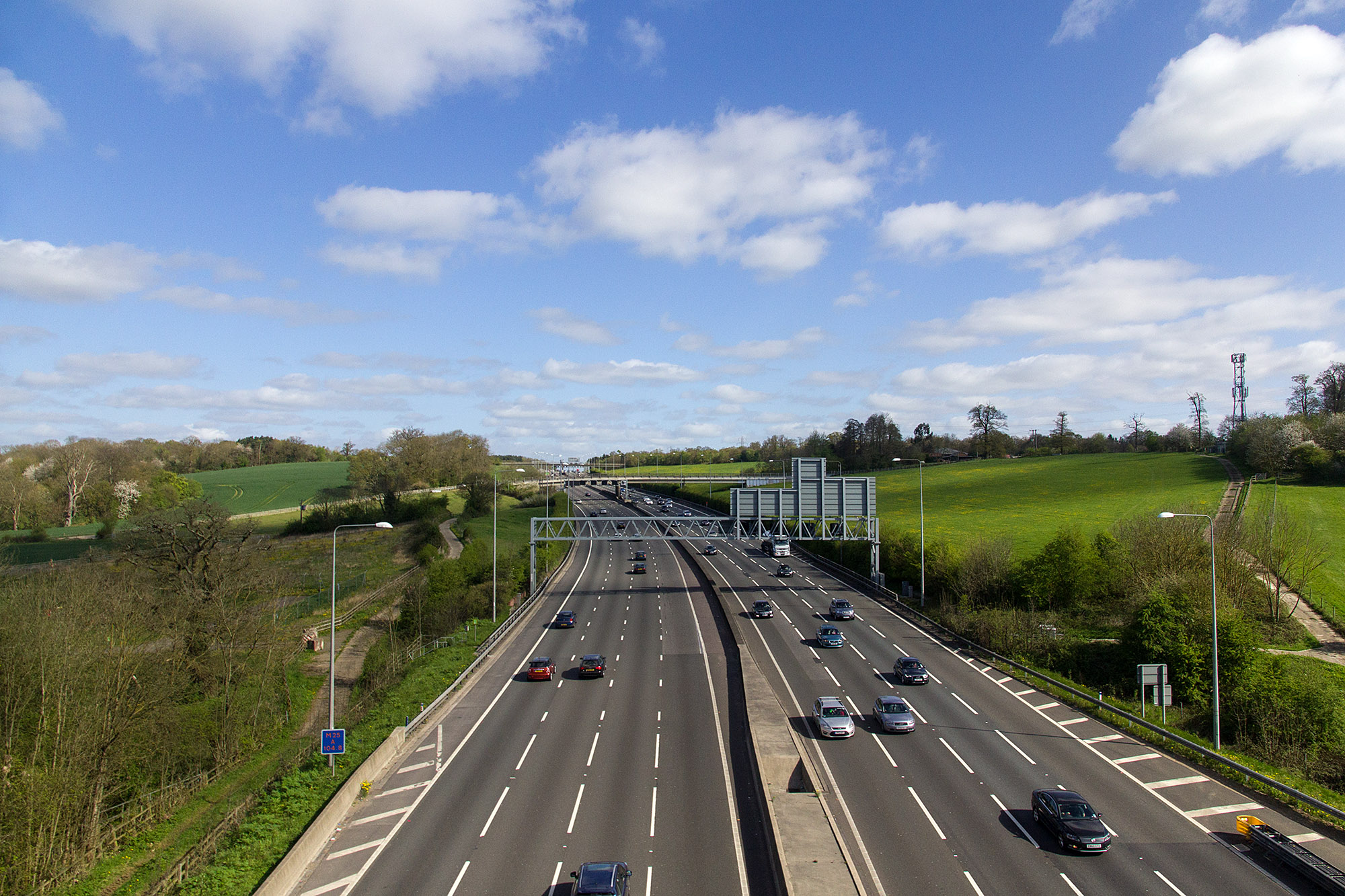
The busy M25 motorway that circles the urban area

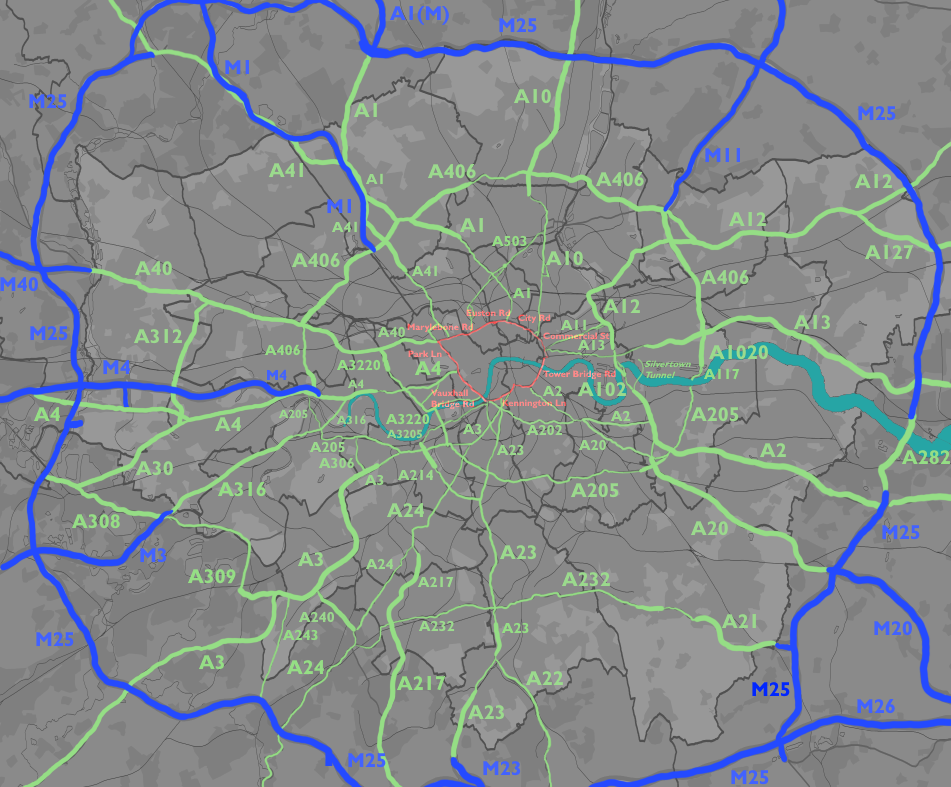
Map of all primary routes and motorways in Greater London

Due to the opposition to the Ringway plan and earlier proposals there are few grade-separated routes penetrating to the city centre. Only the western A40, northeastern A12 Leyton By-pass, eastern A13 and southeastern A2 are grade-separated for most of the way into central London. There is also the eastern A1203, a dual carriageway tunnel around the Docklands area, which directly links onto the A13.

There is a technical distinction between the motorways, operated by National Highways, and other major routes, operated by TfL as the Transport for London Route Network (TLRN). Many of London's major radial routes continue far beyond the city as part of the national motorway and trunk road network.

From the north, clockwise (and noting a key commuter location served by each rather than the final destination), the major radial routes are the A10 (north to Hertford), the M11 (north to Cambridge), the A12 (northeast to Chelmsford), the A127 (east to Southend), the A13 (also east to Southend), the A2/M2 (east to Chatham), the A20/M20 (east to Maidstone), the A23/M23 (south to Gatwick Airport and Brighton), the A3 (southwest to Guildford), A316/M3 (southwest to Basingstoke), the A4/M4 (west to Heathrow Airport and Reading), the A40/M40 (west to Oxford), the M1 (northwest to Luton & Milton Keynes) and the A1 (north to Stevenage).

There are also three ring roads linking these routes orbitally. The innermost, the Inner Ring Road, circumnavigates the congestion charging zone in the city centre. The generally grade-separated North Circular Road (the A406 from Gunnersbury to East Ham) and the non-separated South Circular Road (the A205) form a suburban ring of roughly 10 km (6.2 miles) radius. Finally, the M25 encircles most of the urban area with roughly a 25 km (16 miles) radius. The western section of the M25 past Heathrow Airport is one of Europe's busiest, carrying around 200,000 vehicles per day.

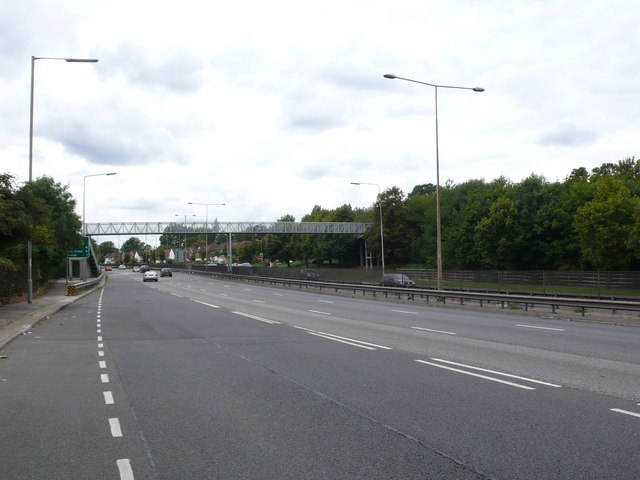
A406 North Circular Road

None of these roads have tolls, although the Dartford Crossing, which links the two ends of the M25 to the east of London, is tolled. The Blackwall Tunnel and Silvertown Tunnel will be tolled from 2025, with charges expected to be similar to the Dartford Crossing.

=== Distributor and minor routes ===
The major roads mentioned above are supplemented by a host of standard single-carriageway main roads, operated as part of the aforementioned TLRN. These roads generally link suburbs with each other, or deliver traffic from the ends of the major routes into the city centre.

The TLRN is supplemented by local distributor roads operated by the local authorities, the London boroughs. These non-strategic roads only carry local traffic.

=== Congestion charge and emissions charges ===
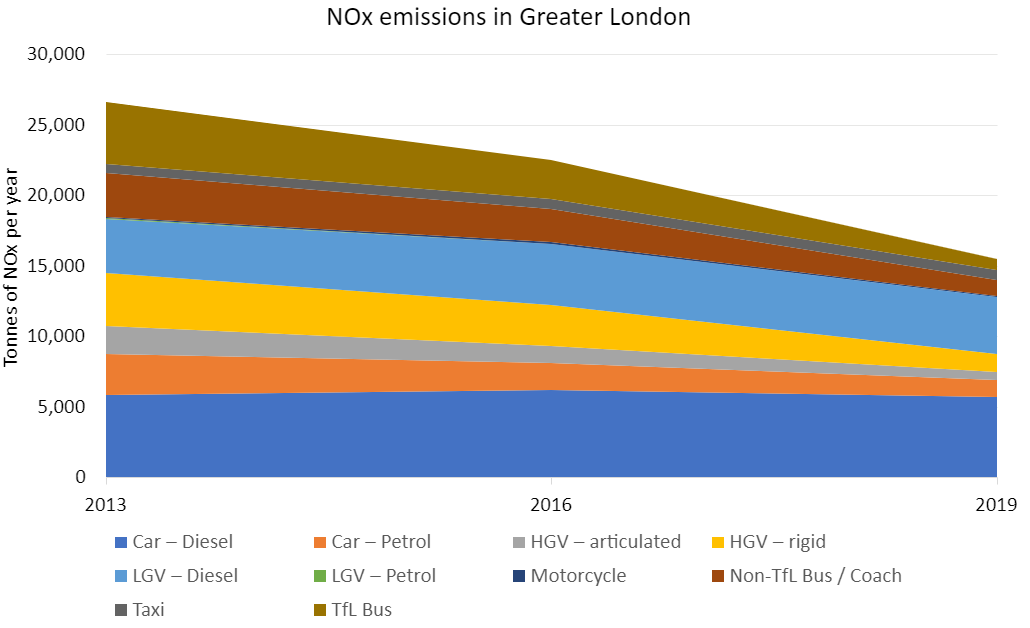
NOx emissions from road transport in Greater London (GLA boundary) from 2013 to 2019

In 2003, TfL introduced a congestion charge for all non-exempt vehicles entering Central London during busy periods with the aim of reducing traffic congestion and improving journey times for buses, cars, and delivery vehicles. Within three years, traffic congestion within the operational area had dropped by 30%, with delays dropping from 2.3 to 1.8 delay minutes per kilometre, though its effectiveness is contested by critics. The charge was increased to £8 per day in 2005. From 2007 to December 2010, the zone was extended to cover most of Kensington and Chelsea. As of 2019, around 90,000 vehicles drive into the congestion charging zone each day, down from over 100,000 in 2017.

In April 2019, the Ultra Low Emission Zone (ULEZ) came into force across Central London, which operates 24/7 and applies to vehicles which do not meet Euro 4 standards for petrol and Euro 6 for diesel. ULEZ replaced the older T-charge which only required Euro 4 standards.

In October 2021, the ULEZ was extended to the North and South Circular Roads, covering an area containing 3.8 million people, meaning an estimated 100,000 cars, 35,000 vans and 3,000 lorries would pay the charge daily. In August 2023, it was extended to cover all of Greater London, and is the largest low emission zone in Europe.

=== Road casualties in London ===
Fatal road casualties have decreased by half in since the mid-2000s, with a Vision Zero target of 2041 for no deaths and serious injuries on London's transport network. Work to reduce road casualties has included:

- introduction of lower speed limits (often 20 mph)
- redesign of junctions & removal of gyratories such as Elephant and Castle
- introduction of segregated cycle lanes on key corridors
- improving safety of larger vehicles like buses & heavy goods vehicles through the Direct Vision Standard (which ensures drivers have a reasonable view of the road)
- education and marketing (such as Think! Road safety campaign)
- training for vulnerable road users (such as motorcyclists and cyclists)

The following table shows the number of casualties, grouped by severity, on the roads of Greater London (including the City of London), over recent years. However, data from the years 2017 and onwards should not be directly compared with previously collected data due to the introduction of online self reporting.

Road casualties in London by year
| | 2008 | 2009 | 2010 | 2011 | 2012 | 2013 | 2014 | 2015 | 2016 | 2017 | 2018 | 2019 | 2020 |
|---|---|---|---|---|---|---|---|---|---|---|---|---|---|
| Fatal | 204 | 184 | 126 | 159 | 134 | 132 | 127 | 136 | 116 | 131 | 112 | 125 | 96 |
| Serious | 3,322 | 3,043 | 2,760 | 2,646 | 2,884 | 2,192 | 2,040 | 1,956 | 2,385 | 3,750 | 3,953 | 3,780 | 2,974 |
| Total | 3,526 | 3,227 | 2,886 | 2,805 | 3,018 | 2,324 | 2,167 | 2,092 | 2,501 | 3,881 | 4,065 | 3,905 | 3,070 |
| Slight | 24,627 | 24,752 | 26,003 | 26,452 | 25,762 | 24,875 | 28,618 | 28,090 | 27,769 | 28,686 | 26,526 | 26,102 | 21,275 |
| Grand Total | 28,361 | 27,979 | 28,889 | 29,257 | 28,780 | 27,199 | 30,785 | 30,182 | 30,270 | 32,567 | 30,591 | 25,341 | 21,001 |

== Active travel and micromobility ==
=== Walking ===
London contains several footpaths.

Several areas in London are pedestrianised. In 2026, Oxford Street became partially pedestrianised by the Oxford Street Development Corporation.

=== Cycling ===
Cycling in London is a widely popular mode of transport and leisure activity within London. As of 2008 more than one million Londoners owned bicycles, an 83 per cent increase over ownership in 2000.

There are currently an estimated 480,000 cycle journeys each day in the capital. The growth in cycling can partly be attributed to the launch in 2010 by Transport for London (TfL) of the capital's cycle hire system throughout the city's centre. By 2013, the scheme was attracting a monthly ridership of approximately 500,000, peaking at a million rides in July of that year.

=== Public hire schemes ===
==== Santander Cycles ====
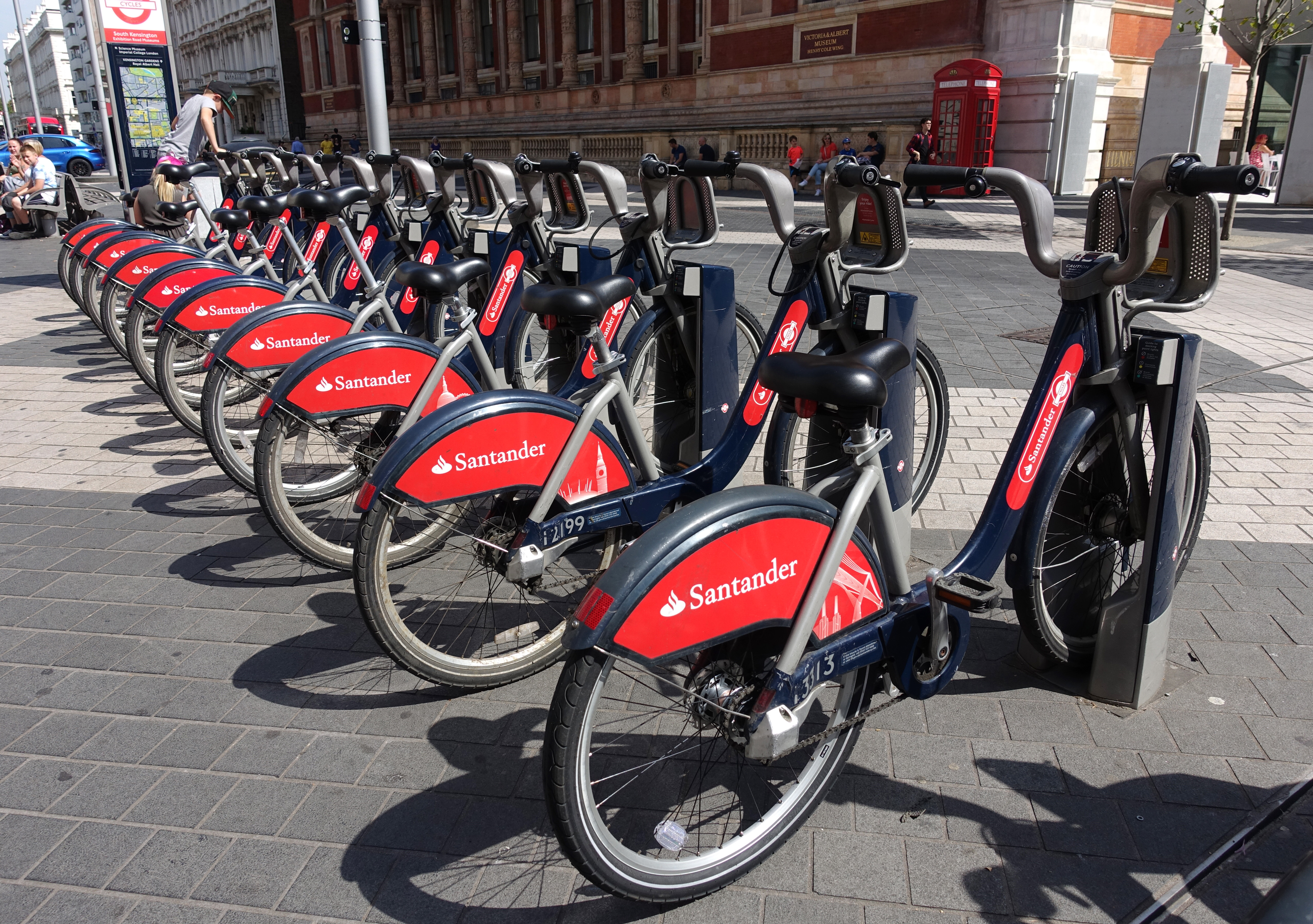
Santander Cycles docking station on Exhibition Road

Around 12,000 Santander Cycles (originally named Barclays Cycle Hire) are available at 800 docking stations across London.

==== Dockless schemes ====
The first dockless electric bicycle scheme in London was launched in 2017.

As of 2026, dockless bicycle schemes and dockless scooter schemes are regulated by individual agreements between local authorities and the operators of the schemes.

The English Devolution and Community Empowerment Act 2026 would allow for a regulatory single framework for London to be established.

In 2026, there were 350,000 shared dockless electric bicycle journeys taken on average per day.

== Buses ==
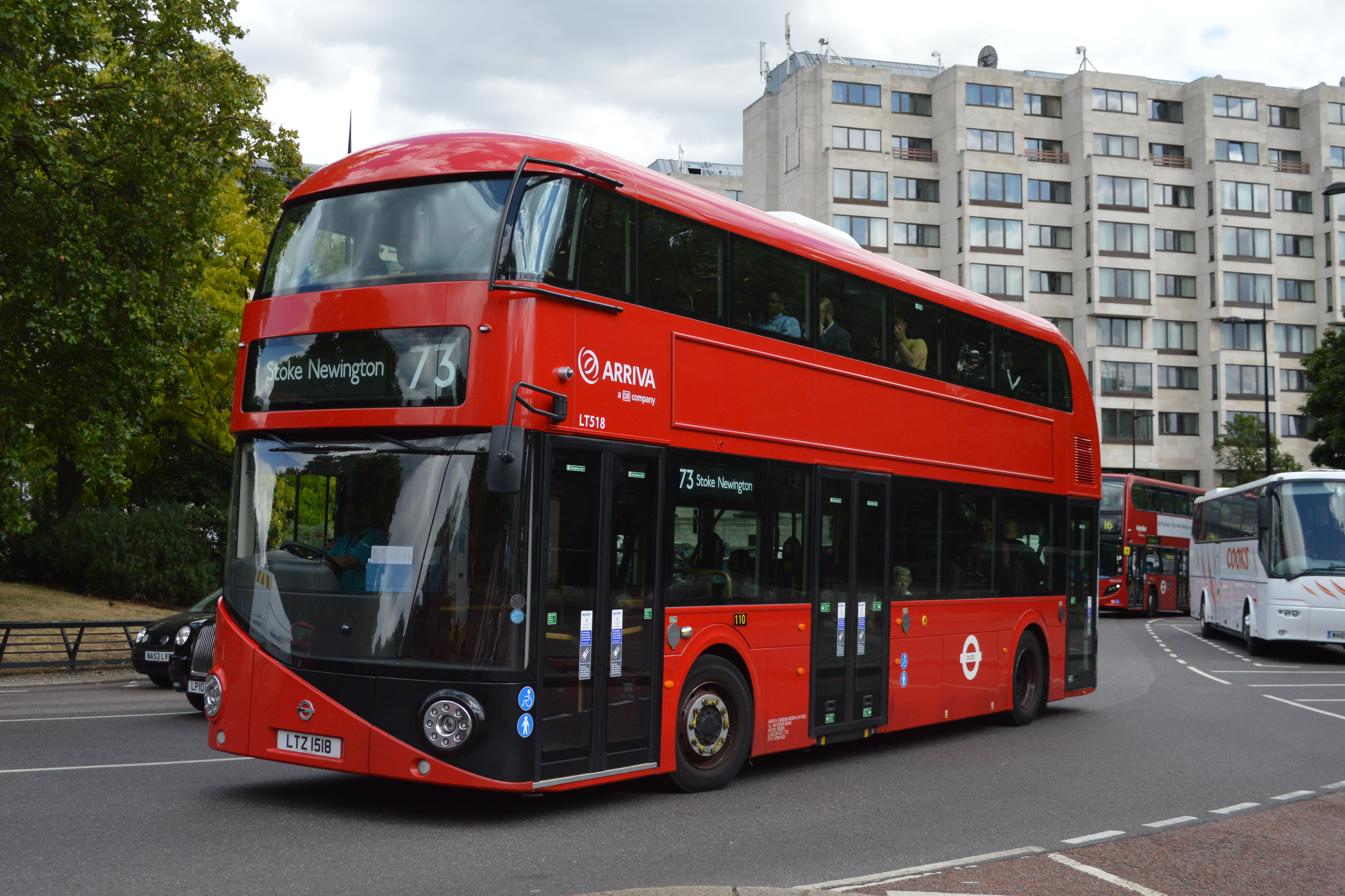
A New Routemaster bus entering Park Lane on route 73 to Stoke Newington

The London bus network is extensive, with over 6,800 scheduled services every weekday carrying about six million passengers on over 700 different routes making it one of the most extensive bus systems in the world and by far the largest in Europe. Catering mainly for local journeys, it carries more passengers than the Underground. In addition to this extensive daytime system, a 100-route night bus service is also operated, providing a 24-hour service.

Over 2,000 buses in the 8,700 strong bus fleet are battery electric and hydrogen fuel cell buses, the 2nd largest zero emission bus fleet in Europe (behind Moscow). In 2006, London became one of the first major cities in the world to have an accessible, low floor bus fleet.

The London Buses network and its branded services, the Superloop and East London Transit systems are managed by TfL through its arms-length subsidiary company, London Buses Ltd. As a result of the privatisation of London bus services in the mid-1990s, bus operations in London are put out to competitive tendering; routes are operated by a number of private companies, while TfL sets the routes, frequencies, fares and types of vehicle used (Greater London was exempted from the bus deregulation in Great Britain). Transport companies may bid to run London bus services for a fixed price for several years, with incentives and penalties in place to encourage good performance against certain criteria. The tendering system is open to transport operators from a global market, with the result that some London bus services are now operated by international groups such as ComfortDelGro.

Bus operators in London
| Operator | Routes | TfL routes | Parent company |
|---|---|---|---|
| Arriva London | London | Yes | Arriva |
| Carousel Buses | Buckinghamshire | No | Go-Ahead Group |
| First Beeline | Berkshire | No | FirstGroup |
| First Bus London | London | Yes | FirstGroup |
| Go-Ahead London | London | Yes | Go-Ahead Group |
| Green Line Coaches | Express services to Berkshire & Hertfordshire | No | Arriva |
| London Sovereign | North London | Yes | FirstGroup |
| London Transit | North, West & Central London | Yes | FirstGroup |
| London United | West & Central London | Yes | FirstGroup |
| Metrobus | South and South-east London, and parts of Surrey, Kent, West and East Sussex | No | Go-Ahead Group |
| Metroline | North & West London | Yes | ComfortDelGro |
| Stagecoach London | South and East London | Yes | Stagecoach Group |
| Sullivan Buses | Hertfordshire & North London | Yes | - |
| Transport UK London Bus | London | Yes | Transport UK Group |
| Uno | Hertfordshire & North London | Yes | University of Hertfordshire |

Many services are operated with the iconic red double-decker buses, using modern low-floor accessible vehicles rather than the traditional open-platform AEC Routemasters which were phased out in 2006.

The bus system has been the subject of much investment since TfL's inception in 2000, with consequent improvements in the number of routes (particularly night services), their frequency, reliability and the standard of the vehicles used. By 2010, bus journeys in London had increased by 69 per cent since 2000, despite the growth rate in passengers slowing since the late 2000s.

== Taxis and private hire vehicles ==
=== Black cabs and hire cars ===
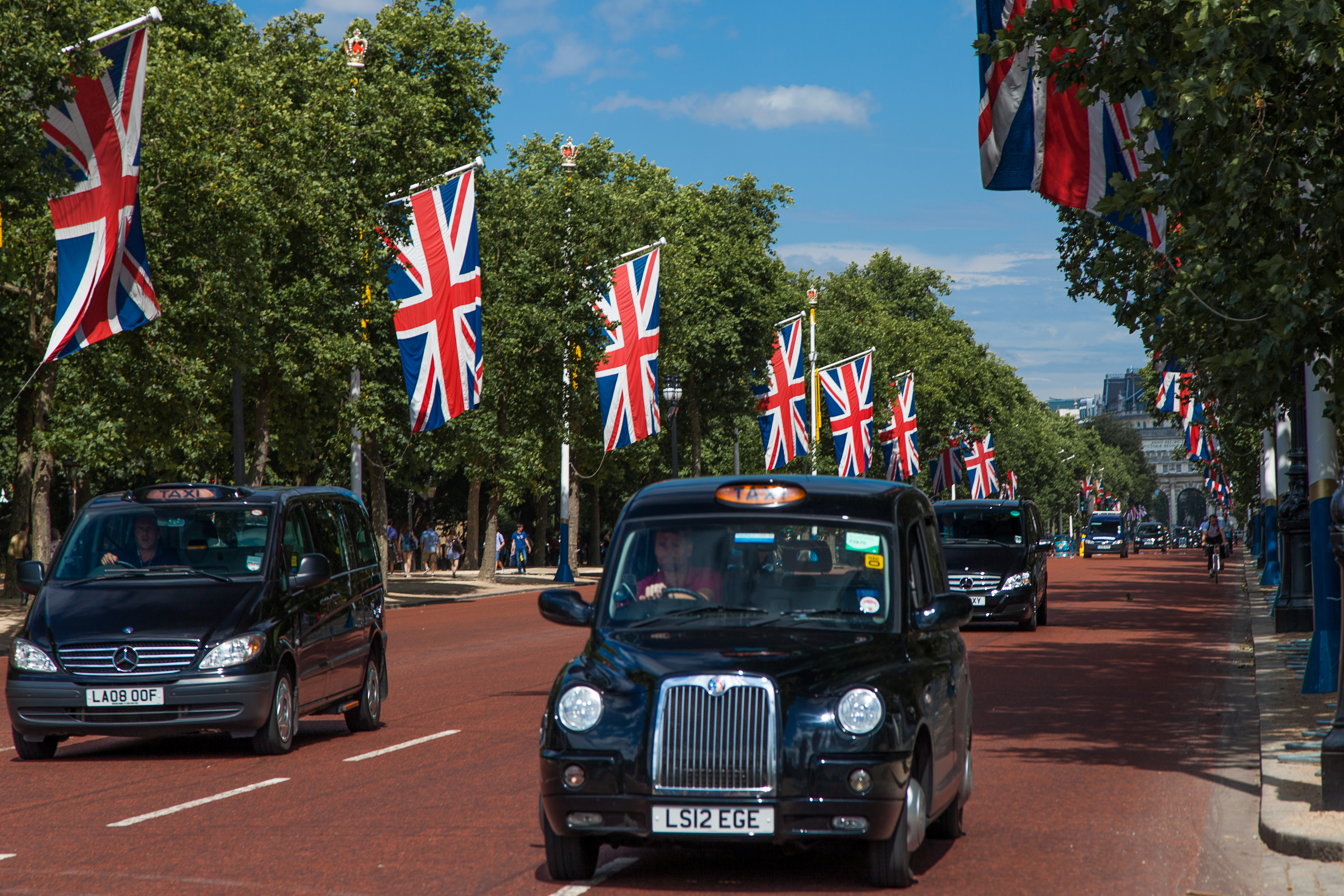
The iconic Hackney carriage or black cab

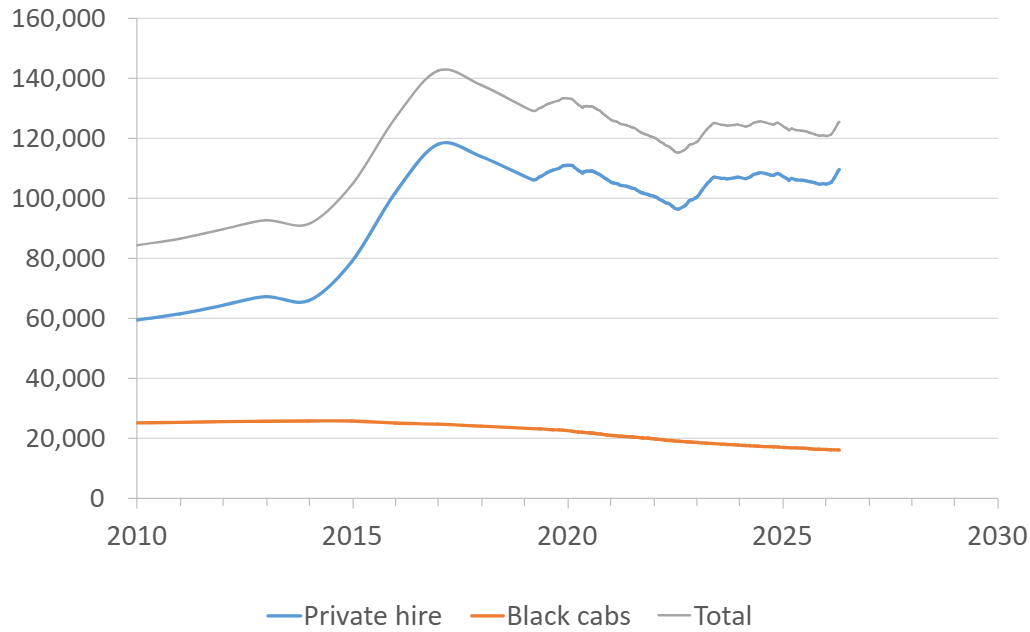
Taxis and private hire driver licences in London from 2010 to 2022

The iconic black cab remains a common sight. They are driven by the only taxicab drivers in the world who have spent at least three years learning the city's road network to gain "The Knowledge". All London taxicabs are licensed by TfL's Public Carriage Office (PCO), who also set taxicab fares along with strict maximum vehicle emission standards. Black cabs can be hailed on the street or hired from a taxicab rank (found at all the mainline railway termini and around the major business, shopping and tourist centres). Taxicab fares are set by TfL and are calculated using a taximeter in the vehicle (hence the name "taxicab") and are calculated using a combination of distance travelled and time.

Private hire vehicles (PHVs or minicabs) are cars which are not licensed to pick people up on the street. They must always be booked in advance by phone or the internet or at the operator's offices. From 1 January 2023, all PHVs licensed for the first time must be Zero Emissions Capable and conform to Euro 6 pollution standards.

=== Bicycle taxis and pedicabs ===
Pedicabs are a fairly recent addition, being mostly used by tourists and operating in the central areas. Cambridge Trishaws Ltd moved from Cambridge to London in 1998 as the first such company to work within the city. There are now 5–10 such companies providing competing services. The Licensed Taxi Drivers Association (LTDA) went to the High Court to try to force them to become licensed, but lost their case in 2004.

There has been a move, led by Chris Smallwood, chairman of the London Pedicab Operators Association, to bring in more relevant legislation. Smallwood helped to draft an amendment to a bill to be put before the House of Lords that would introduce these 'lighter' pedicab regulations. This was followed in 2005 by Transport Committee scrutiny to determine the future of the then nascent industry. This led in turn, to a 2006 TfL consultation "for the introduction of a licensing regime that is appropriate for pedicabs and their riders".

== Airports ==
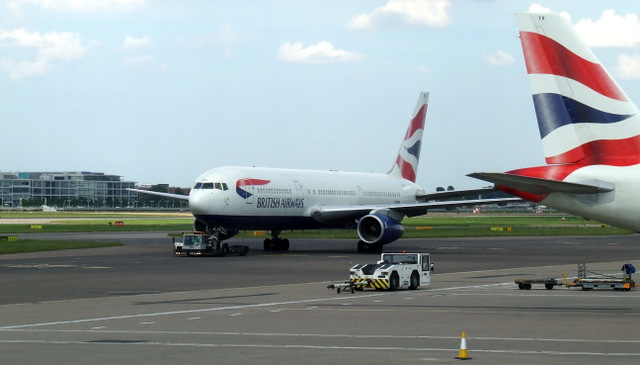
London's Heathrow Airport is one of the busiest airports in the world.

The London airport system is the busiest in the world, with more than 170 million passengers using its six airports in 2017. In order of size, these airports are Heathrow, Gatwick, Stansted, Luton, London City, and Southend.

Heathrow and Gatwick serve long-haul, European and domestic flights; Southend is used mostly for European flights; Stansted and Luton handle low-cost European and domestic services; whilst London City caters for business passengers to short-haul and domestic destinations. A small number of long-haul flights depart from Stansted and London City.

The closest airport to the city centre is London City in the Docklands area, about 10 km east of the City of London financial district. A branch of the Docklands Light Railway links the airport to the City in under 25 minutes.

Two other airports are at the edge of the city but within the Greater London boundary: Biggin Hill, around 23 km (14 miles) southeast of the centre, and London's principal airport, Heathrow, 20–25 km (12–16 miles) from central London.

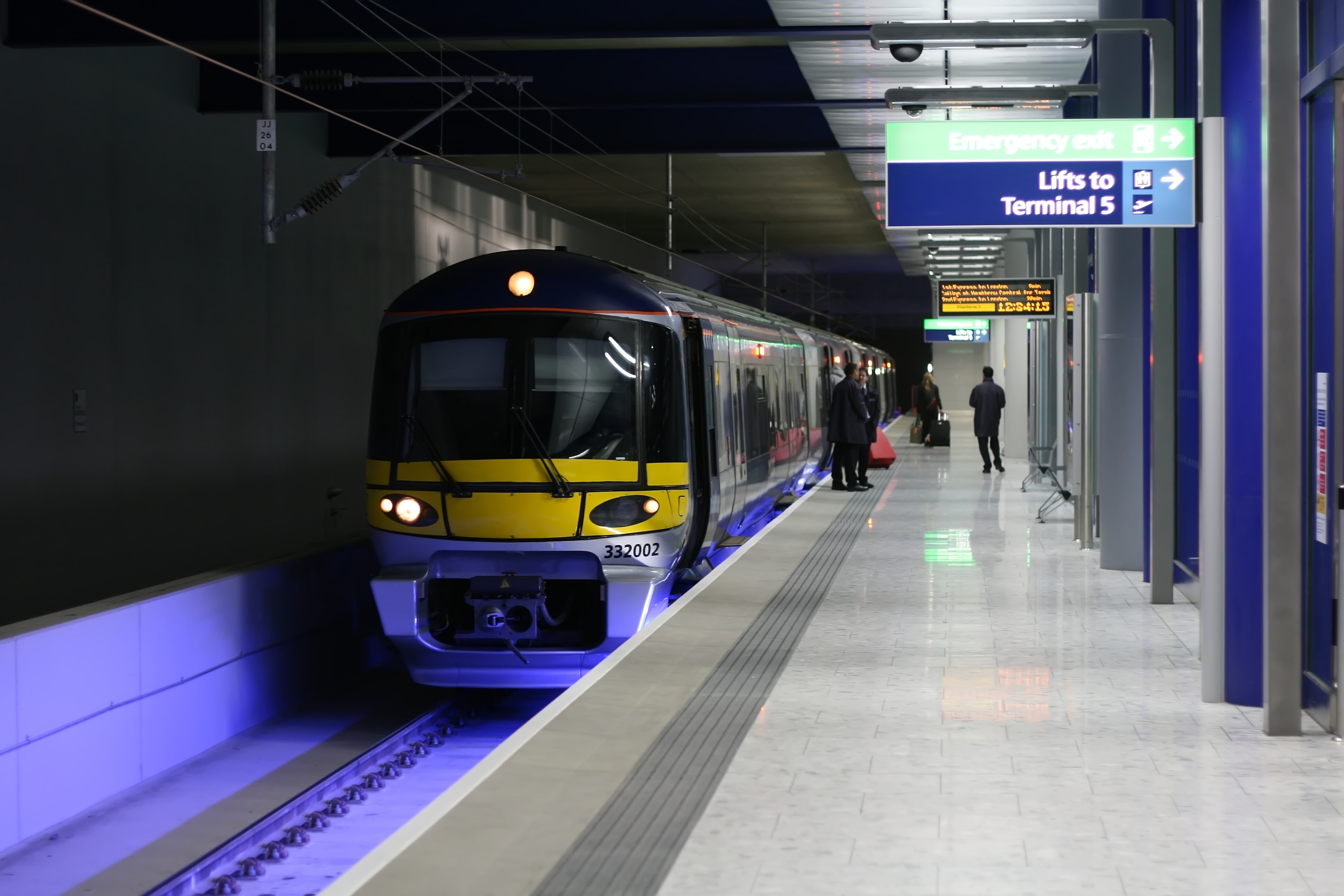
Heathrow Express train prepares to depart from platform 3 at Heathrow Terminal 5 station with a service to London.

Heathrow handles nearly 80 million passengers per annum, making it Europe's busiest airport. On the western edge of the city in the London Borough of Hillingdon, it has two runways and four passenger terminals (numbered as Terminals 2 to 5). It is connected to central London by the dedicated Heathrow Express rail service, the Elizabeth line local rail service and London Underground's Piccadilly line, and is connected to the M4 and M25 motorways. Gatwick is just under 40 km (25 miles) south of central London in Sussex, some distance outside London's boundary. With a single runway and two terminals, it handles about 32 million passengers per year from domestic, short-haul and long-haul flights, and is linked to London by the Gatwick Express, Thameslink and Southern rail services, and by the M23. It is the busiest single-runway airport in the world.

Southend is to the east of London, and was developed rapidly to be usable by short-haul passenger flights in time for the 2012 Summer Olympics. It is connected to London via the A127 road, and an on-airport station with services through Stratford to London Liverpool Street. Passenger numbers have risen significantly from April 2012 when low-cost flights commenced to 13 European destinations.

Stansted is London's most distant airport, about 50 km (31 miles) north of the centre, in Essex. With a single runway and terminal, it handles about 20 million passengers annually, mostly from low-cost short-haul and domestic leisure flights. It is connected to London by the Stansted Express rail service and the M11 motorway.

Luton Airport is about 45 km (28 miles) north-west of London, connected to it by the M1 and Thameslink trains from nearby Luton Airport Parkway station. It has a single terminal and a runway considerably shorter than the other London airports, and like Stansted it caters mainly for low-cost short-haul leisure flights.

RAF Northolt in west London is used by private jets, and London Heliport in Battersea is used by private helicopters. There are also Biggin Hill and Farnborough Airfield. Croydon Airport was originally London's main airport, but was replaced by Heathrow, and closed in 1959.

An airfield at Lydd has been rebranded London Ashford, but currently has little traffic. In August 2009, Oxford Airport, around 95 km (59 miles) from London's city centre, rebranded itself as London Oxford Airport, while Kent International was briefly called London Manston; it is 120 km (75 miles) from London.

In addition, RAF Brize Norton with direct flights to the Falkland Islands is less than two hours away by car. Though not generally considered London airports, Birmingham Airport and Southampton Airport have been suggested as alternative airports for London due to the existence of direct rail links serving Central London.

=== Airport transit ===
Four of London's airports provide varieties of automated people mover (APM) along guided tracks to shuttle passengers between terminals. These small-scale transport systems operate independently of London's main transportation network.

The Gatwick Airport inter-terminal transit, originally built in 1983 and refurbished in 2010, was the first airport driverless train system outside the USA; a similar system, the Stansted Airport Transit System, was opened in 1991 at Stansted Airport to provide airside terminal transfers. At Luton Airport, the Luton DART (Direct Air-Rail Transit), opened in 2023, conveys travellers from Luton Airport Parkway station to the airport terminal.

At Heathrow Airport, an automated people mover system called the Transit operates airside at the newer Heathrow Terminal 5, and since 2011 a personal rapid transit system called Heathrow Pod has operated between Terminal 5 and the car parks.

== Water transport ==
=== River Thames ===
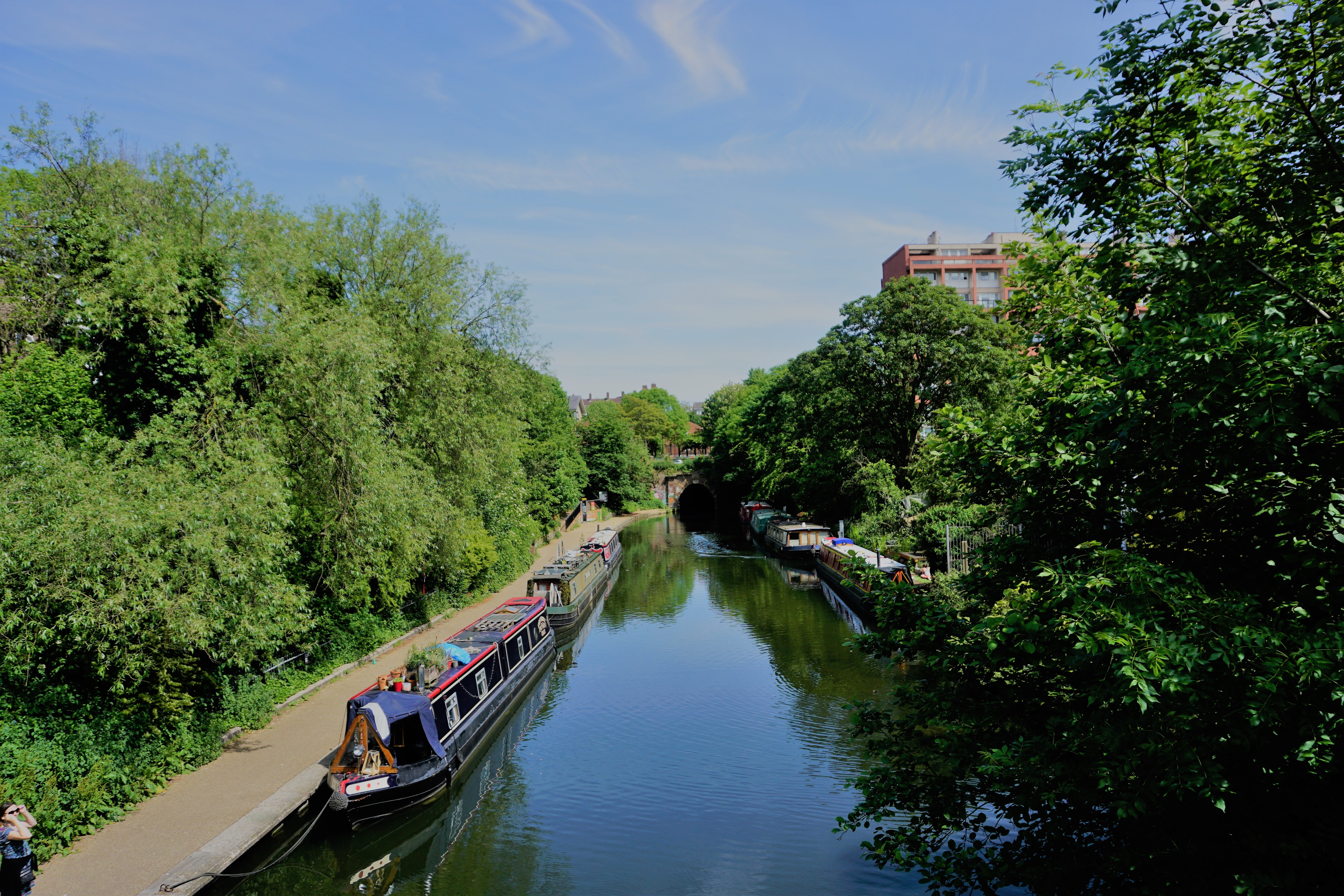
Regent's Canal in Islington

The River Thames is navigable to ocean-going vessels as far as London Bridge, and to substantial craft well upstream of Greater London. Historically, the river was one of London's main transport arteries. Although this is no longer the case, passenger services have seen something of a revival since the creation in 1999 of London River Services, an arm of Transport for London. LRS now regulates and promotes a small-scale network of river bus commuter services and a large number of leisure cruises operating on the river. Boats are owned and operated by a number of private companies, and LRS manages five of central London's 22 piers.

=== Canals ===
Map of canals in London.

London also has several canals, including the Regent's Canal, which links the Thames to the Grand Union Canal and thus to the waterway network across much of England. These canals were originally built in the Industrial Revolution for the transport of coal, raw materials and foods. Although they now carry few goods, they are popular with private narrowboat users and leisure cruisers, and a regular "water bus" service operates along the Regent's Canal during the summer months.

=== Cargo ===
Some bulk cargoes are carried on the Thames, and the Mayor of London wishes to increase this use. London's port used to be the country's busiest when it was located in Central London and east London's Docklands. Since the 1960s, containerisation has led to almost all of the port's activities moving further downstream and the ceasing of port-related activity at the extensive network of docks (which were built in the 19th and early 20th centuries). A purpose-built container port at Tilbury in Essex, around ten kilometres outside the Greater London boundary, is today the busiest part of the port, though activity remains along stretches of the Thames, mainly downstream of the Thames Barrier. Fifty riverside wharfs have been safeguarded from development in Greater London. Today the port is the UK's second largest by cargo handled (53 million tonnes in 2008). The Port of London Authority is responsible for most port activities and navigation along the River Thames in London and on the Thames estuary.

== Cable car ==
The London Cable Car is a cable car link across the River Thames. The service opened on 28 June 2012 and is operated by Transport for London (TfL). In addition to transport across the river, the service advertises "a unique view of London".

The service comprises a 0.62-mile (1.00 km) gondola line that crosses the Thames from the Greenwich Peninsula to the Royal Victoria Dock, to the west of ExCeL London. The cable car is based on monocable detachable gondola (MDG) technology, a system which uses a single cable for both propulsion and support, used also on the Metrocable in Medellín, Colombia. The MDG system was reportedly cheaper and quicker to install than a more complex three-cable system which would have allowed larger-capacity cars.

== Children ==
Children aged between 5 years old and 10 years old can use a 5-10 Zip Oyster photocard which allows free travel on all bus, Tube, London Overground, Elizabeth line, tram, DLR, (except between West Drayton and Reading) and most National Rail services in London. Children aged between 11 years old and 15 years old can use a 5-10 Zip Oyster photocard which allows free bus and tram travel and child-rate fares on the Tube, DLR and other services.

Individual boroughs and the City of London are responsible for education transport for children aged under 16.

== Accessibility ==
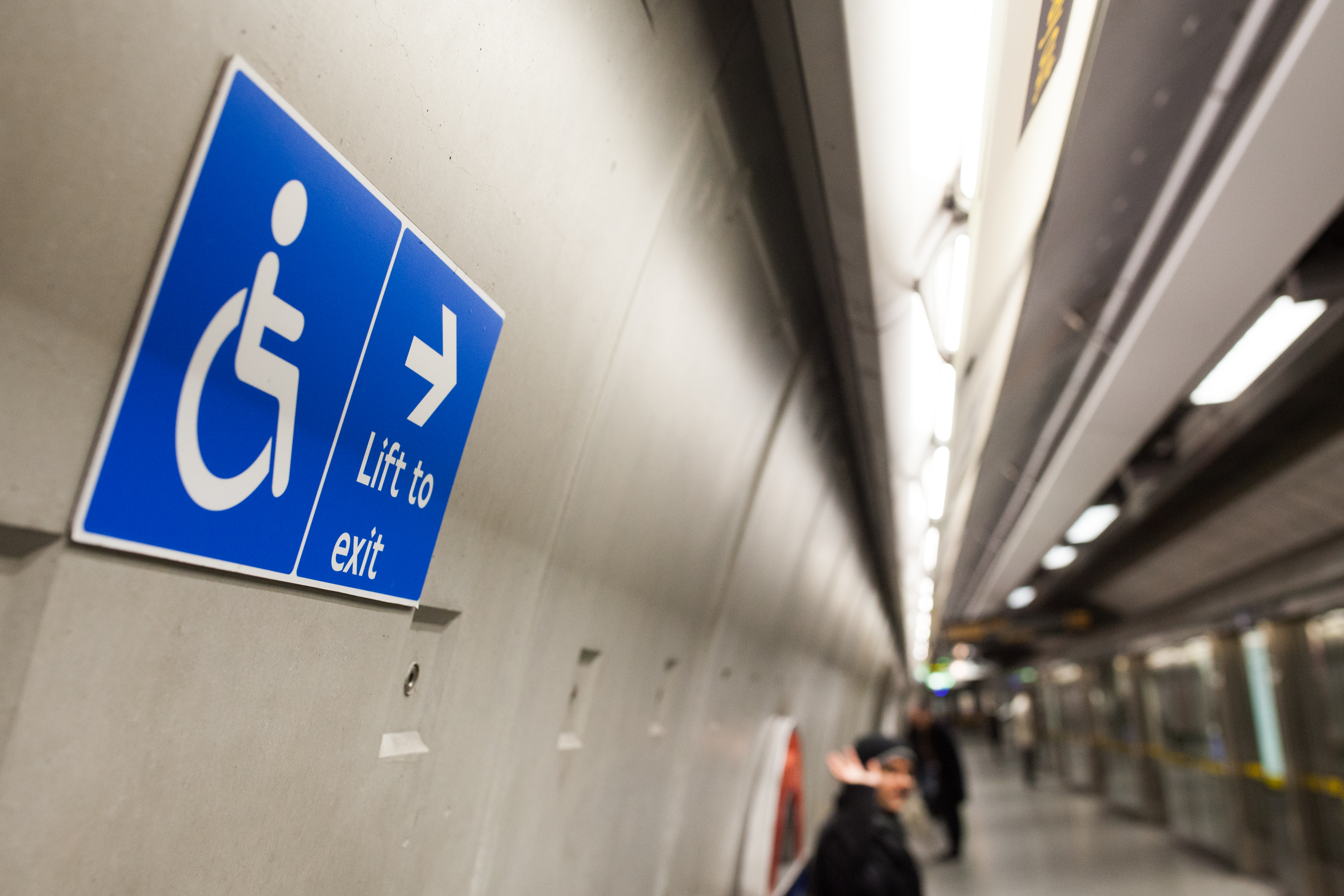
Signs for lifts at Southwark station

The accessibility of public transport services across Greater London is incomplete. Much of the rail network in London (including the London Underground and London Overground) was built before accessibility was a requirement. Until 1993, wheelchair passengers were not permitted to use the Underground. In recent years, major station upgrades and new infrastructure such as the Elizabeth Line has increased the number of step-free stations on the Transport for London (TfL) network to over 270, with all new Underground stations since 1999 opened as accessible stations.

Other modes of transport are significantly more accessible. The Docklands Light Railway and Tramlink have been accessible since opening in 1987 and 2000 respectively. In 2006, London became one of the first major cities in the world to have an accessible, low floor bus fleet – 10 years ahead of the national requirement. Taxis in London have been accessible since 2000.

== Public transport statistics ==
The average amount of time people spend commuting with public transport in London, for example to and from work, on a weekday is 84 minutes, and 30% of passengers ride for more than 2 hours every day. The average length of time people wait at a stop or station for public transit is 10 minutes. The average length of a public transport journey is 8.9 km (5.5 miles), while 20% travel for over 12 km (7.5 miles) in a single direction.

Figures from the DfT show in 2018 there were over 15,000 public electric vehicle charging devices in the UK, with more devices per person in London. In Autumn 2018, crowding across both morning and afternoon peaks on trains into London was at the lowest level since 2013. People made 4.8 billion local bus passenger journeys in England, 58% of all public transport journeys. There were 1.8 billion rail passenger journeys in England. Light rail and tram travel also continued to grow, to the highest level (0.3 million journeys) since comparable records began in 1983.

== Transport strategy of the Mayor of London ==
Since its first iteration in 2001, the transport strategy of the Mayor of London has included different policies.

- The 2001 transport strategy established a framework for an integrated transport network and introduced a congestion charge for the first time.
- The 2004 transport strategy proposed a western extension of the congestion charge to Kensington and Chelsea.
- The 2008 strategy scrapped the extension of the congestion charge and proposed rephrasing traffic lights.
- The 2010 strategy included measures to improve radial connections between outer and inner London.
- The 2017 strategy proposed an increase in the number of bike lanes, and proposed implementing the ULEZ scheme.

== See also ==
- List of bus routes in London
- History of public transport authorities in London
- List of heads of public transport authorities in London
- London fare zones
- Transport in England
