= April 1917 =

Month in 1917

| << | April 1917 | | | | | >> |
| Su | Mo | Tu | We | Th | Fr | Sa |
| 1 | 2 | 3 | 4 | 5 | 6 | 7 |
| 8 | 9 | 10 | 11 | 12 | 13 | 14 |
| 15 | 16 | 17 | 18 | 19 | 20 | 21 |
| 22 | 23 | 24 | 25 | 26 | 27 | 28 |
| 29 | 30 |

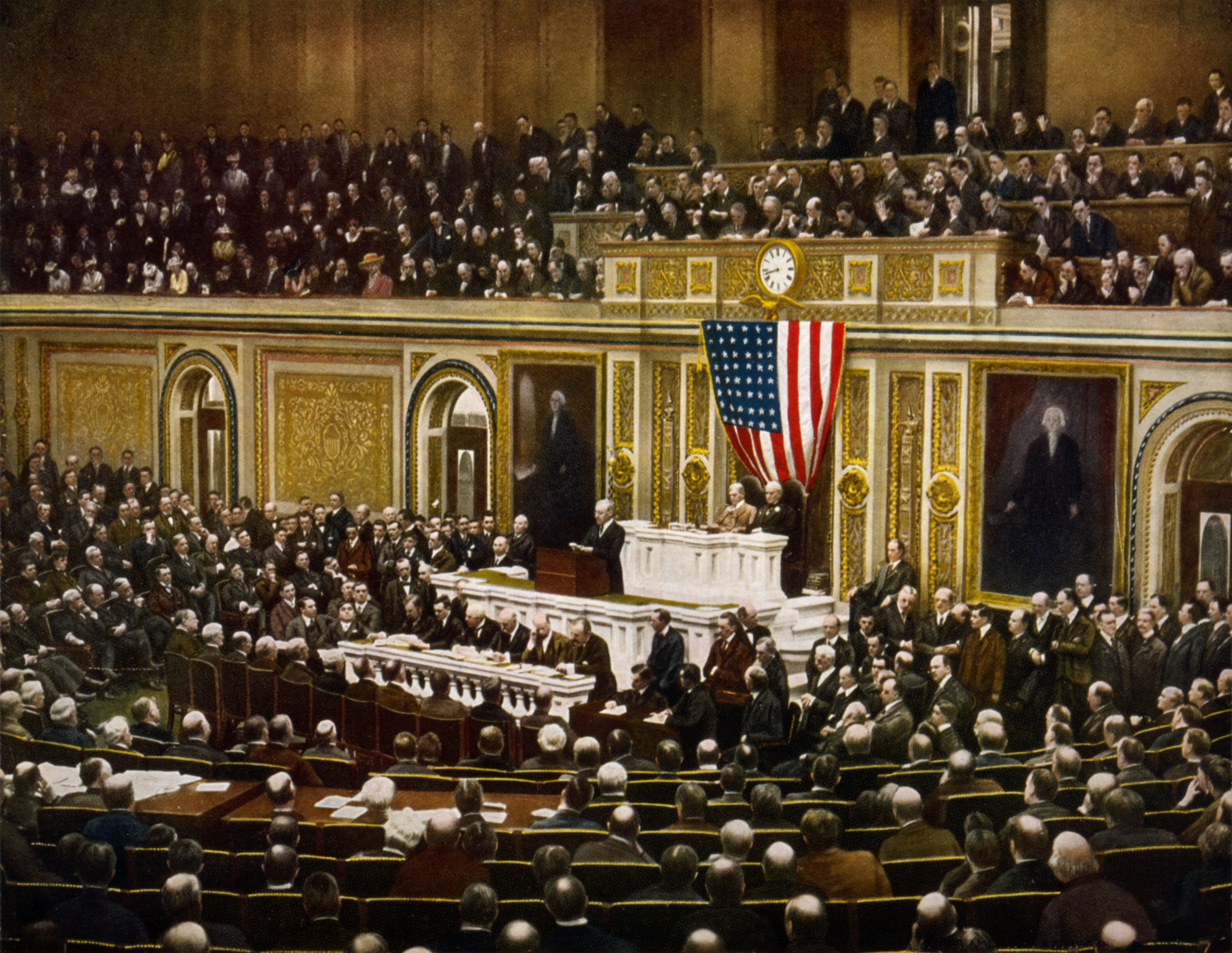
April 6, 1917: U.S. Congress votes to enter World War One at the request of President Woodrow Wilson

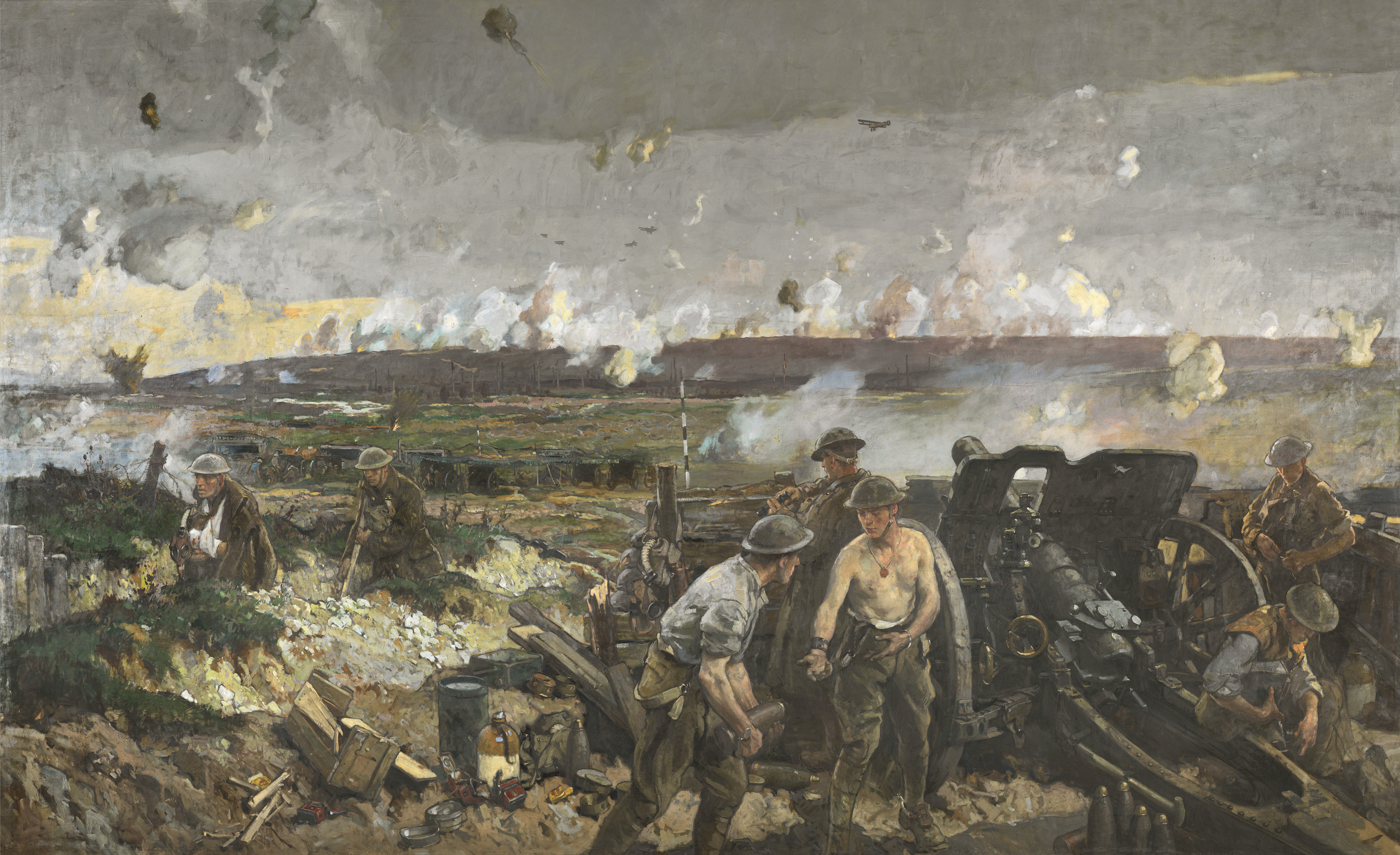
The Battle of Vimy Ridge, painting by Richard Jack.

The following events occurred in April 1917:

== April 1, 1917 (Sunday) ==
- Federico Tinoco Granados, President of Costa Rica, held the first general elections since staging a military coup in January. The election results where Granados was declared the winner were contested as fraudulent after votes for former president and main opponent Rafael Yglesias Castro were considered invalid.
- The United States Army established the 41st Infantry Division as a National Guard unit, five days before the United States entered World War I. It was changed to an infantry unit in July.
- The 243rd Infantry Division was established as part of the last wave of new divisions created for the Imperial German Army. It was dissolved in 1919.
- The Dutch news agency Aneta was established as the first news organization in the Dutch East Indies (now Indonesia), and was the predecessor to Antara.
- The Russian newspaper Pravda Severa (Truth of the North) released its first edition in Arkhangelsk, Russia.
- The Spanish newspaper El Ideal Gallego released its first edition in A Coruña, Spain.
- The Nuneaton Museum & Art Gallery opened in Nuneaton, England.
- The Mære Station for the Norwegian State Railways line opened at Mære, Norway and operated until 2001.
- Born:
  - Sydney Newman, Canadian television producer, created popular television shows including The Avengers and Doctor Who; as Sydney Cecil Nudelman, in Toronto, Canada (d. 1997)
  - Michel Donnet, Belgian air force officer, commander of the No. 64 and 350th Squadrons of the Royal Air Force during World War II, recipient of the Distinguished Flying Cross and Croix de guerre; in Richmond, London, England (d. 2013)
  - Mark Evans Austad, American broadcaster and diplomat, leading news broadcaster with WTTG in Washington, D.C. and diplomat for Gerald Ford and Ronald Reagan; in Ogden, Utah, United States (d. 1988)
  - Bonnie Baker, American jazz and big band singer, best known for the hit single "Oh Johnny, Oh Johnny, Oh!"; as Evelyn Underhill, in Orange, Texas, United States (d. 1990)
  - Dinu Lipatti, Romanian pianist, known for his interpretations of Johannes Brahms and Frédéric Chopin; as Constantin Lipatti, in Bucharest, Kingdom of Romania (present-day Romania) (d. 1950)
- Died: Scott Joplin, 48, American composer and pianist, most popular of the ragtime musical artists, including compositions "Maple Leaf Rag" and "The Entertainer" (b. 1867)

== April 2, 1917 (Monday) ==
- U.S. President Woodrow Wilson asked the United States Congress for a declaration of war on Germany, stating that the war would "make the world safe for democracy" and later that it would be a "war to end war".
- The Lillestrøm football club was founded after the merger of two local clubs. The team currently plays out of the Åråsen Stadion in Lillestrøm, Norway.
- Born: Dabbs Greer, American actor, best known for the role of Reverend Robert Alden on the television show Little House on the Prairie; as Robert William Greer, in Fairview, Missouri, United States (d. 2007)

== April 3, 1917 (Tuesday) ==
Vladimir Lenin

- Vladimir Lenin left Switzerland for Russia using a "sealed train" to cross Germany.
- Louis J. Wilde was elected 17th mayor of San Diego, beating George Marston with 58 percent of the vote.
- Battle of Toboly - Central Powers troops captured in a rapid attack Russian bridgehead over the Stochod river around the villages of Toboly and Helenin, Volynska Oblast, nowadays north-western Ukraine. Action also showed a successful strategy of coordination of infantry and artillery implemented by German general Georg Bruchmüller.
- The Brazilian football club Maruinense was established in Maruim, Brazil as the Socialista Sport Club before it was renamed in the 1960s.
- Died:
  - Arthur Graeme West, 25, British poet, author of The Diary of a Dead Officer; killed in action (b. 1891)
  - Milton Wright, 88, American religious leader, bishop of the Church of the United Brethren in Christ, father to the Wright brothers (b. 1828)

== April 4, 1917 (Wednesday) ==
- Walter Edward Foster replaced James Alexander Murray as Premier of New Brunswick, with the latter only serving two months.
- The first test flight of the French SPAD S.XIII was conducted.
- The National Sylvan Theater, the first federally-funded outdoor public theater, opened in Washington, D.C., in the presence of U.S. President Woodrow Wilson.
- Born:
  - Richard John Cork, British air force officer, commander of the 880 Naval Air Squadron, recipient of the Distinguished Flying Cross and Distinguished Service Cross for actions during the Battle of Britain during World War II; in London, England (d. 1944, killed in a plane crash)
  - William J. Hovde, American air force officer, commander of several squadrons in World War II, Korean War and Cold War including the 14th Fighter Group, six-time recipient of the Distinguished Flying Cross, Silver Star and Legion of Merit; as William Johnston Hovde, in Crookston, Minnesota, United States (d. 1996)

== April 5, 1917 (Thursday) ==
Aerial shot of the defunct Hindenburg Line at Bullecourt, France 1920.

- The Imperial German Army completed its withdrawal to the Hindenburg Line, the new main defensive line in the Western Front.
- Brazilian steamship Paraná was torpedoed by a German submarine, killing three crewmen. The attack on shipping from neutral countries boosted public pressure for Brazil to enter the war.
- The British government issued a Food Hoarding Order to prevent households from hoarding food in short supply during World War I.
- New U.S. military aircraft began landing at Kelly Field in San Antonio, Texas, to improve military aircraft capacity for the Mexico–United States border.
- Born: Robert Bloch, American writer, author of many best-selling science fiction and horror fiction including Psycho; in Milwaukee, United States (d. 1994)
- Died: E. H. Coombe, 58, Australian politician, member of the South Australian House of Assembly from 1901 to 1912, and 1915 to 1917 (b. 1858)

== April 6, 1917 (Friday) ==
- The United States declared war on Germany after passing U.S. President Woodrow Wilson's resolution for military action against the Empire. The United States House of Representatives voted 373 to 50 in favor of declaring war. The United States Senate also voted 82 to 6 in favor of war.
- Ottoman authorities deported the entire civilian population of Jaffa and Tel Aviv on orders from Ottoman Syria Governor Djemal Pasha. Muslim evacuees were eventually allowed to return, but Jewish evacuees were not able to return until after the British conquest of Palestine.
- German flying ace Hans Berr died when he and his wingmate collided during a dogfight with planes from the Royal Flying Corps No. 57 Squadron. He had 10 victories to his credit.
- The United States Marine Corps aviation unit was built to a total strength of seven commissioned officers and 43 enlisted men.
- The Independent Social Democratic Party of Germany was formed by expelled members of the Social Democratic Party of Germany, with Hugo Haase as the party's first chair.
- Born:
  - Leonora Carrington, English-born Mexican painter, best known for her work in surrealism including El Mundo Magico de los Mayas and Mujeres conciencia as part of the women's liberation movement in Mexico; as Mary Leonora Carrington, in Clayton-le-Woods, England (d. 2011)
  - Howard L. Fogg, American artist, best known for his railroad art, particularly for the American Locomotive Company; as Howard Lockhart Fogg, in New York City, United States (d. 1996)
- Died: Prince Friedrich Karl of Prussia, German noble and champion horse rider, bronze medalist in the 1912 Summer Olympics; died of gunshot wounds after being shot down in combat (b. 1893)

== April 7, 1917 (Saturday) ==
- Cuba and Panama declared war on Germany as allies to the United States.
- German merchant raider ship SMS Cormoran was scuttled at Guam shortly after the crew learned the United States had declared war on Germany, but nine crew members were accidentally killed during detonation.
- American songwriter George M. Cohan completed the most famous World War I-themed song, "Over There", but would not have it published until June 1.
- The American Friends Service Committee was established by members of the Religious Society of Friends to assist civilian victims in World War I.
- Born:
  - R. G. Armstrong, American actor, best known for his collaborations with film director Sam Peckinpah including Ride the High Country, Major Dundee and Pat Garrett and Billy the Kid; as Robert Golden Armstrong Jr., in Pleasant Grove, Alabama, United States (d. 2012)
  - Mongo Santamaría, Cuban-American jazz musician and composer, best known for developing Afro-Caribbean Latin jazz including the standard "Afro Blue"; as Ramón Santamaría Rodríguez, in Havana, Cuba (d. 2003)
- Died:
  - Spyridon Samaras, 55, Greek composer, known for operas including Messidor, Lionella and Rhea (b. 1861)
  - George Brown, 81, British missionary, founder of the Piula Theological College in Samoa (b. 1835)

== April 8, 1917 (Sunday) ==
- In Petrograd, 40,000 ethnic Estonians demanded national autonomy within Russia.
- Born: John Whitney, American animator, pioneer in computer animation including Five Film Exercises and Moondrum; in Pasadena, California, United States (d. 1995)
- Died:
  - Richard Olney, 81, American politician, 40th United States Attorney General (b. 1835)
  - Arsenio Cruz Herrera, 53, Filipino politician, first indigenous mayor of Manila and leader of the Progresista Party from 1907 to 1914 (b. 1863)
  - Wilhelm Frankl, 23, German air force officer, commander of Jagdstaffel 4 for the Luftstreitkräfte, recipient of the Iron Cross; killed in action (b. 1893)

== April 9, 1917 (Monday) ==
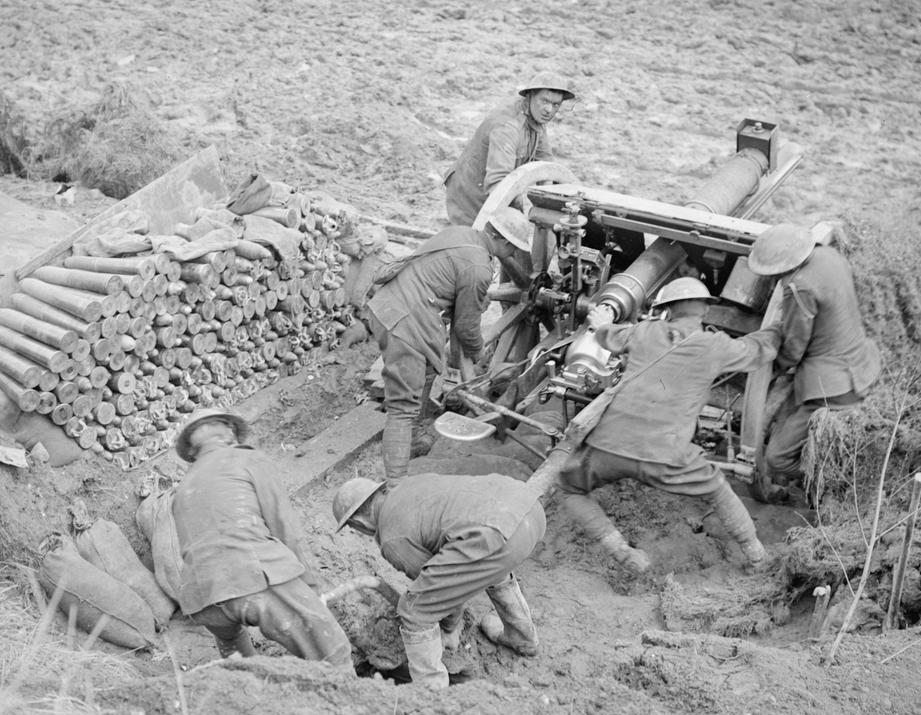
British gun crew in action during Battle of Arras.

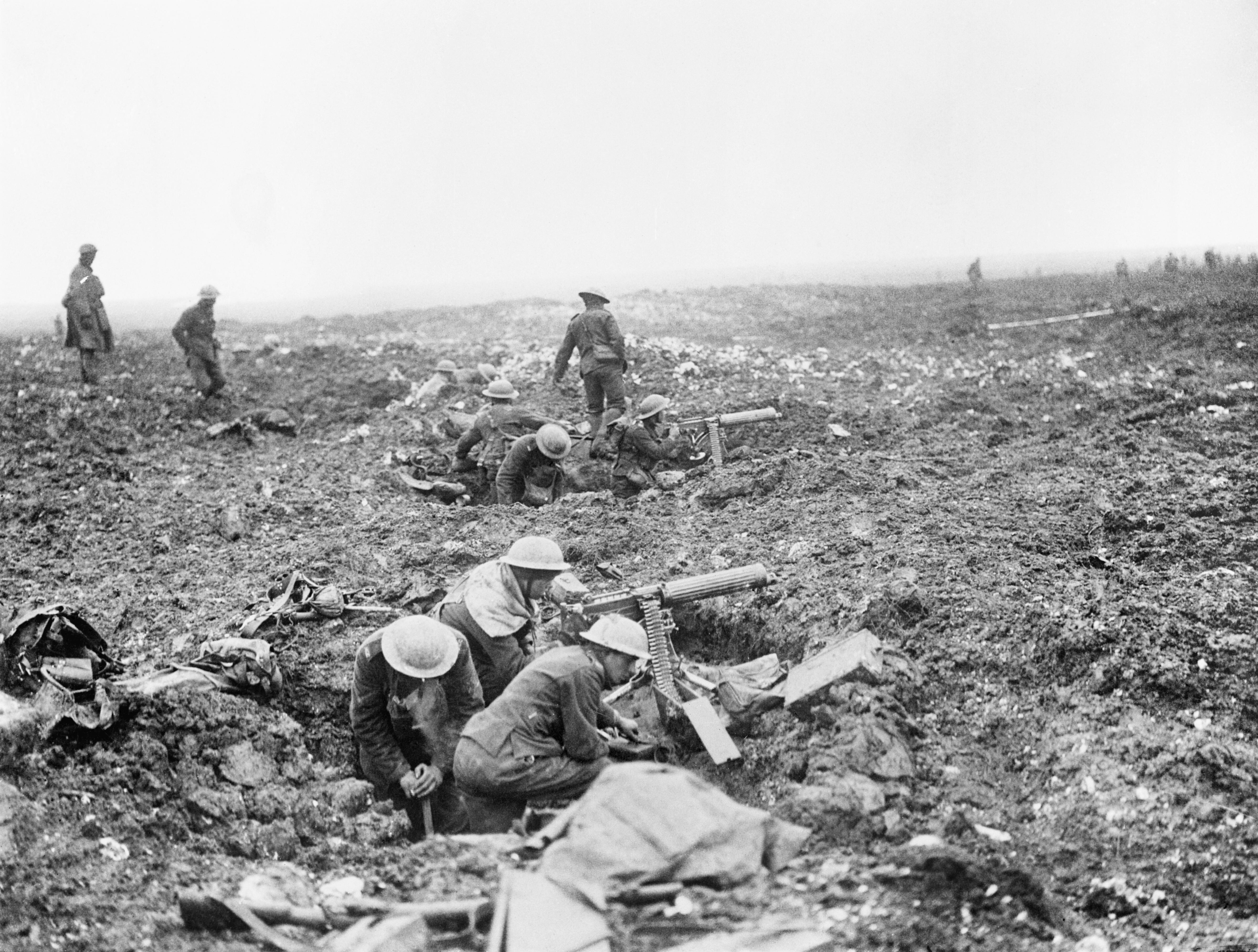
Canadian machine gun squad at the Battle of Vimy Ridge.

- Battle of Arras – Fourteen British, Australian, Canadian, New Zealand and South African divisions attacked an 11 mi (18 km) portion of the German line near the city of Arras, France. The French Third Army also provided support by attacking the German line at St. Quentin–Arras, France.
- Battle of Vimy Ridge – Four divisions of the Canadian Corps attacked Vimy Ridge held by three divisions of the German Sixth Army as part of the Arras offensive, capturing most of the escarpment on the first day of the attack.
- Charles Burke, first commander of the No. 2 Squadron, was killed by a shell burst on the opening day of the Arras offensive while rejoining his old regiment. Although he wasn't part of the Royal Flying Corps at the time of death, his death became part of Bloody April. The Corps lost 245 aircraft — 140 in the first two weeks — out of an initial strength of 365. Casualties included 211 killed or missing and 108 captured. The opposing Germans lost only 66 aircraft.
- The Patriot Youth League of Sweden was established to promote the preservation of the monarchy and the official church of Sweden.
- Born:
  - Brad Dexter, American actor, known for roles in The Magnificent Seven and Run Silent, Run Deep; as Boris Michel Soso, in Goldfield, Nevada, United States (d. 2002)
  - Irene Morgan, American activist, noted plaintiff in Morgan v. Virginia, which was the first case to successfully challenge state segregation laws; in Baltimore, United States (d. 2007)
  - Johannes Bobrowski, German poet, known for his lyric poetry collections including The Land of Sarmatia and Shadowland; in Tilsit, East Prussia, German Empire (present-day Sovetsk, Lithuania) (d. 1965)
  - Vincent O'Brien, Irish horse trainer, trained six champion race horses including the only British Triple Crown winner since World War II; as Michael Vincent O'Brien, in Ireland (d. 2009)
- Died:
  - Edward Thomas, 39, British poet, known for his poetry collections Six Poems, Poems and Last Poems; killed in action (b. 1878)
  - R. E. Vernède, 41-42, English poet, known for poetry collection War Poems, And Other Verses, published posthumously; killed in action (b. 1875)
  - Charlie Gould, 69, American baseball player, first baseman for the Cincinnati Red Stockings from 1869 to 1870 (b. 1847)

== April 10, 1917 (Tuesday) ==
- Battle of Arras – The British 3rd and 12th Divisions captured much of German line along the Scarpe River, known as Monchyriegel, between the French villages of Feuchy and Wancourt. However, Germany still retained control of the village of Neuville-Vitasse in the center.
- Battle of Vimy Ridge – Canadian forces captured the French village of Thélus, forcing the German divisions to evacuate most of Vimy Ridge except for a defensive position on a hill code-named "The Pimple".
- An explosion at an ammunition factory in Chester, Pennsylvania, killed 139 workers.
- Red Cross hospital ship HMHS Salta struck a mine and sank at Le Havre, France with the loss of 130 of the 205 people on board. A British patrol boat that came to rescue survivors also struck a mine and sank, with the loss of 19 of 59 crewmen.
- Born: Robert Burns Woodward, American chemist, recipient of the Nobel Prize in Chemistry for his research into organic synthesis; in Boston, United States (d. 1979)

== April 11, 1917 (Wednesday) ==
- Brazil severed diplomatic relations with Germany after submarines began targeting shipping from neutral countries.
- Battle of Arras – The British 56th Division forced German defenders out of the French village Neuville-Vitasse, securing most of the Monchyriegel line. However, attempts to capture and hold Bullecourt by the British 62nd Division and the Australian 4th Division failed.
- The New York State Police was established through state legislation.
- The Marinens floatplane, based on a design by Maurice Farman of Farman Aviation Works, took its first test flight. It would be used by the Royal Norwegian Navy Air Service until 1924.
- Japanese electric equipment manufacturer Nissin Electric was established in Kyoto.
- Born:
  - Morton Sobell, American spy, member of a New York spy ring for the Soviet Union; in New York City, United States (d. 2018)
  - Danny Gallivan, Canadian sports commentator, broadcaster for Hockey Night in Canada from 1952 to 1984; as Daniel Leo Gallivan, in Sydney, Nova Scotia, Canada (d. 1993)
  - Barney McCosky, American baseball player, outfielder for the Detroit Tigers, Philadelphia Athletics, Cincinnati Reds and Cleveland Indians from 1939 to 1953; as William Barney McCosky, in Coal Run, Pennsylvania, United States (d. 1996)
- Died: Percy Black, 39, Australian army officer, commander of the 16th Battalion, Royal Western Australia Regiment, recipient of the Distinguished Service Order and the Croix de guerre; killed in action (b. 1877)

== April 12, 1917 (Thursday) ==
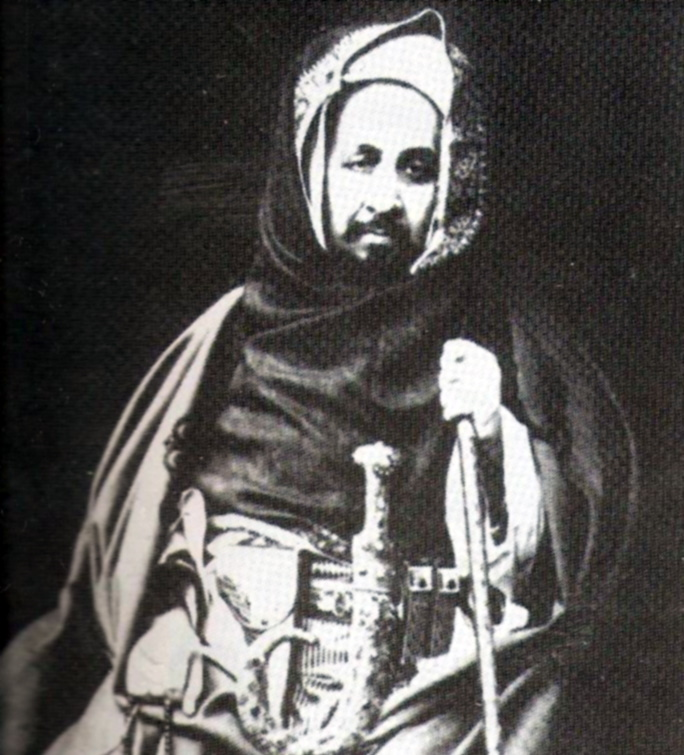
Senussi rebel leader Sayed Ahmed

- Battle of Vimy Ridge – Canadian forces captured the hill known as "The Pimple", the last German defense position on Vimy Ridge. The victory came at a cost of 10,602 casualties, including 3,598 killed and 7,004 wounded. German casualties for the battle were unknown but 4,000 men were prisoners. Four Canadian soldiers were awarded the Victoria Cross: William Johnstone Milne and Ellis Wellwood Sifton (posthumously as both were killed on the first day of battle), and John George Pattison and Thain Wendell MacDowell.
- The Autonomous Governorate of Estonia was formed within Russia from the Governorate of Estonia and the northern part of the Governorate of Livonia.
- Senussi campaign – A peace deal was brokered between the British and the Senussi, with Prince Idris recognized as Emir (ruler) of Cyrenaica in what is present-day Libya. Senussi rebel leader Sayed Ahmed was able to escape to Constantinople where he remained for the remainder of World War I.
- The daily newspaper Tiesa released its first edition, becoming the first official newspaper of Lithuania.
- Norwegian football club Grand Bodø was established in Bodø, Norway.
- Born:
  - Džemal Bijedić, Yugoslav state leader, 27th Prime Minister of Yugoslavia; in Mostar, Austria-Hungary (present-day Bosnia and Herzegovina) (d. 1977)
  - William A. Campbell, American air force officer, member and commander of the 332d Expeditionary Operations Group, better known as the Tuskegee Airmen, during World War II, recipient of the Bronze Star Medal and Legion of Merit; in Tuskegee, Alabama, United States (d. 2012)
  - Helen Forrest, American big band singer, lead vocalist for Artie Shaw, Benny Goodman, and Harry James; as Helen Fogel, in Atlantic City, New Jersey, United States (d. 1999)
  - Robert Orville Anderson, American industrialist, founder of the oil company ARCO; in Chicago, United States (d. 2007)

== April 13, 1917 (Friday) ==
- U.S. President Woodrow Wilson made an executive order to establish the Committee on Public Information as an independent agency of the U.S. Government to influence public opinion on the United States entry into World War I.
- Royal Naval Air Service flying boats began flying "spider web" patrols over the North Sea to detect German submarines in the area. The new patrol pattern, resembling a spider web, allowed four aircraft to search a 4,000-square-mile (10,000-square-kilometer) area in about five hours, only half the time it took a surfaced submarine to transit the area. The flying boats made 27 patrols in the next 18 days, sighted eight German submarines, and made bombing attacks against three of them.
- U.S. Navy battleship New Mexico was launched by the New York Naval Shipyard in New York City. It was most famous for supporting the major amphibious landings during World War II against the Japanese in the Pacific before it was decommissioned in 1946.
- Danish composer Carl Nielsen premiered his most popular piano composition Chaconne.
- Born:
  - Bill Clements, American politician, 42nd and 44th Governor of Texas; as William Perry Clements Jr., in Dallas, United States (d. 2011)
  - Journal Kyaw Ma Ma Lay, Burmese writer, known for works including short story collections A Slow Stream of Thoughts and Burmese Medicine Tales; in Bogale Township, British Burma (present-day Myanmar) (d. 1982)
  - Ian Bruce Ferguson, New Zealand-Australian army officer, commander of 1st and 3rd Battalions of the Royal Australian Regiment during World War II and the Korean War, recipient of the Military Cross and Distinguished Service Order; in Wellington, New Zealand (d. 1988)
  - Albert Wattenberg, American physicist, member of the Manhattan Project; in New York City, United States (d. 2007)
- Died: Diamond Jim Brady, 60, American business leader, leading sales agent for Manning, Maxwell and Moore and Pressed Steel Car Company, known for lavish lifestyle and collection of rare jewels (b. 1856)

== April 14, 1917 (Saturday) ==
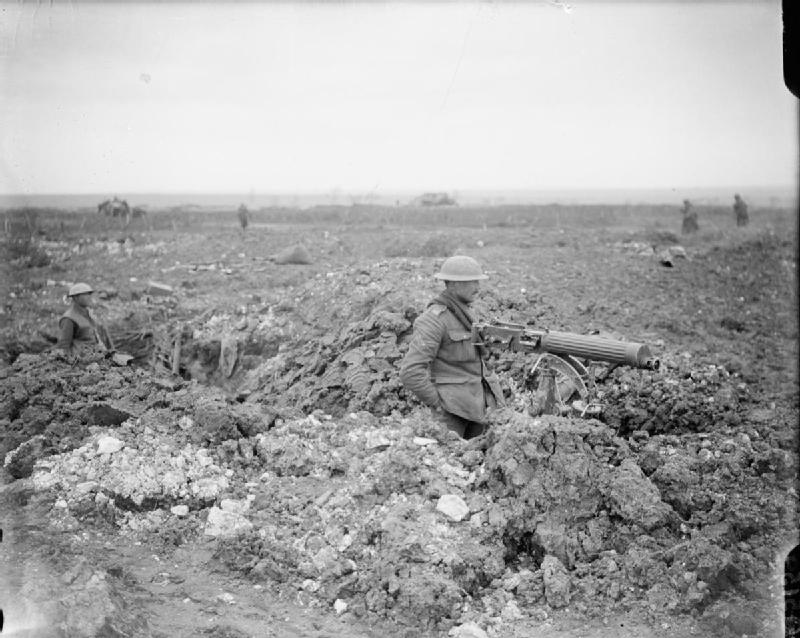
A British machine gun post near Feuchy.

- Battle of Arras – British forces took control of the French commune Monchy-le-Preux, completing the objective to capture the entire German-held Monchyriegel line between Feuchy and Wancourt, France and ending the first phase of the battle for Scarpe River.
- German flying ace Hartmuth Baldamus died in a plane crash following a mid-air collision with a French aircraft near Sainte-Marie-à-Py, France. He was credited with 18 victories.
- Born:
  - Valerie Hobson, Irish-born British actress, best known for her roles in Great Expectations and Kind Hearts and Coronets; as Babette Louisa Valerie Hobson, in Larne, Ireland (d. 1998)
  - Francis B. Wai, American army officer, recipient of the Medal of Honor for action during the Philippines Campaign during World War II; in Honolulu, Territory of Hawaii, United States (present-day Hawaii, U.S.) (d. 1944, killed in action)
  - Marvin Miller, American sports executive, executive director of the Major League Baseball Players Association from 1966 to 1982; in New York City, United States (d. 2012)
  - Joe Kuharich, American football player and coach, guard for the Notre Dame Fighting Irish football team from 1935 to 1937, and coached the team from 1959 to 1962; as Joseph Lawrence Kuharich, in South Bend, Indiana, United States (d. 1981)
- Died: L. L. Zamenhof, 57, Polish physician, creator of Esperanto (b. 1859)

== April 15, 1917 (Sunday) ==
- Battle of Arras – German forces attacked the 1st and 2nd Australian Divisions defending the French village of Lagnicourt. The Australians repelled the attack at a cost of 1,010 casualties; the Germans suffered 2,313 casualties.
- Royal Navy troopship SS Arcadian was torpedoed and sunk in the Sea of Crete northeast of Milos, Greece by German submarine SM UC-74 with the loss of 277 lives.
- Royal Navy troopship Cameronia was torpedoed and sunk in the Mediterranean Sea east of Malta by German submarine SM U-33. Estimated casualties ranged from 140 to 210 of the 2,650 people on board.
- The Royal Flying Corps established air squadron No. 99.
- Born:
  - Hans Conried, American voice actor, best known for the voice of Captain Hook in the Disney animated film Peter Pan; in Baltimore, United States (d. 1982)
  - Elmer Gedeon, American baseball player and air force officer, center fielder for the Cleveland Indians, bomber captain with the European Theater of Operations during World War II; in Cleveland, United States (d. 1944, killed in action)
  - Ishrat Hussain Usmani, Pakistani physicist, second chairman of the Pakistan Atomic Energy Commission and associate director of the Space & Upper Atmosphere Research Commission; in Aligarh, British India (present-day India) (d. 1992)
- Died:
  - Frank Rockefeller, 71, American industrialist, member of the Rockefeller family, younger brother to John D. Rockefeller and William Rockefeller Jr., president of Columbus Castings from 1905 to 1908 (b. 1845)
  - John Harry Grainger, 62, British-Australian architect and engineer, designer of key bridges in Australia including the Princes Bridge in Melbourne, father to Percy Grainger (b. 1854)

== April 16, 1917 (Monday) ==
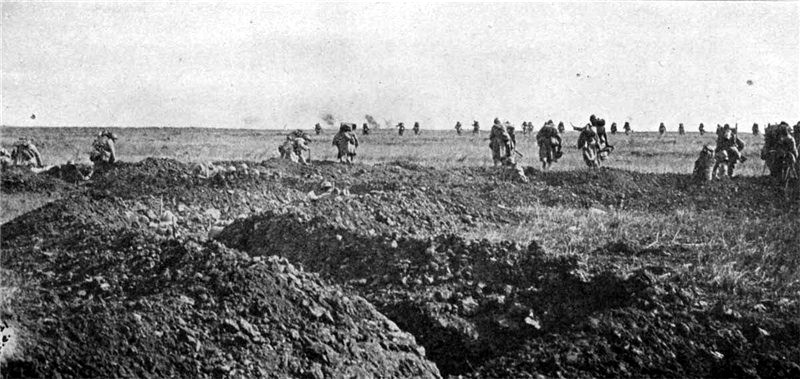
French infantry advance on the Chemin des Dames line during the Second Battle of the Aisne.

- The Nivelle offensive commenced with the Second Battle of the Aisne, with the Fifth and Sixth French Armies attacking the German line at Chemin des Dames, France.
- Royal Navy destroyer HMS Melampus accidentally struck British submarine HMS C16 and sunk it, killing all 16 crew on board.
- Vladimir Lenin arrived at the Finland Station in Petrograd.
- The London Underground extended the Bakerloo line with new tube stations at Bushey, Harrow & Wealdstone, Hatch End, Headstone Lane, Kenton, North Wembley, Wembley Central, Harlesden, Watford Junction, and Watford High Street.
- The Charlie Chaplin comedy The Cure was released in one of the few films that year where Chaplin did not appear as The Tramp.
- The city of Urbandale, Iowa, was incorporated.
- Born:
  - Betty Clay, leader of the Scouting and Guiding organizations, daughter of Scouting founder Robert Baden-Powell; as Betty St Clair Baden-Powell (d. 2004)
  - Barry Nelson, American actor, first to play James Bond, in the 1954 television film version of Casino Royale; as Robert Haakon Nielsen, in San Francisco, United States (d. 2007)
  - Charlotte Salomon, German painter, known for her works, including the series (Life? or Theater?: A Song-play); in Berlin, German Empire (present-day Germany) (d. 1943, gassed at Auschwitz)

== April 17, 1917 (Tuesday) ==
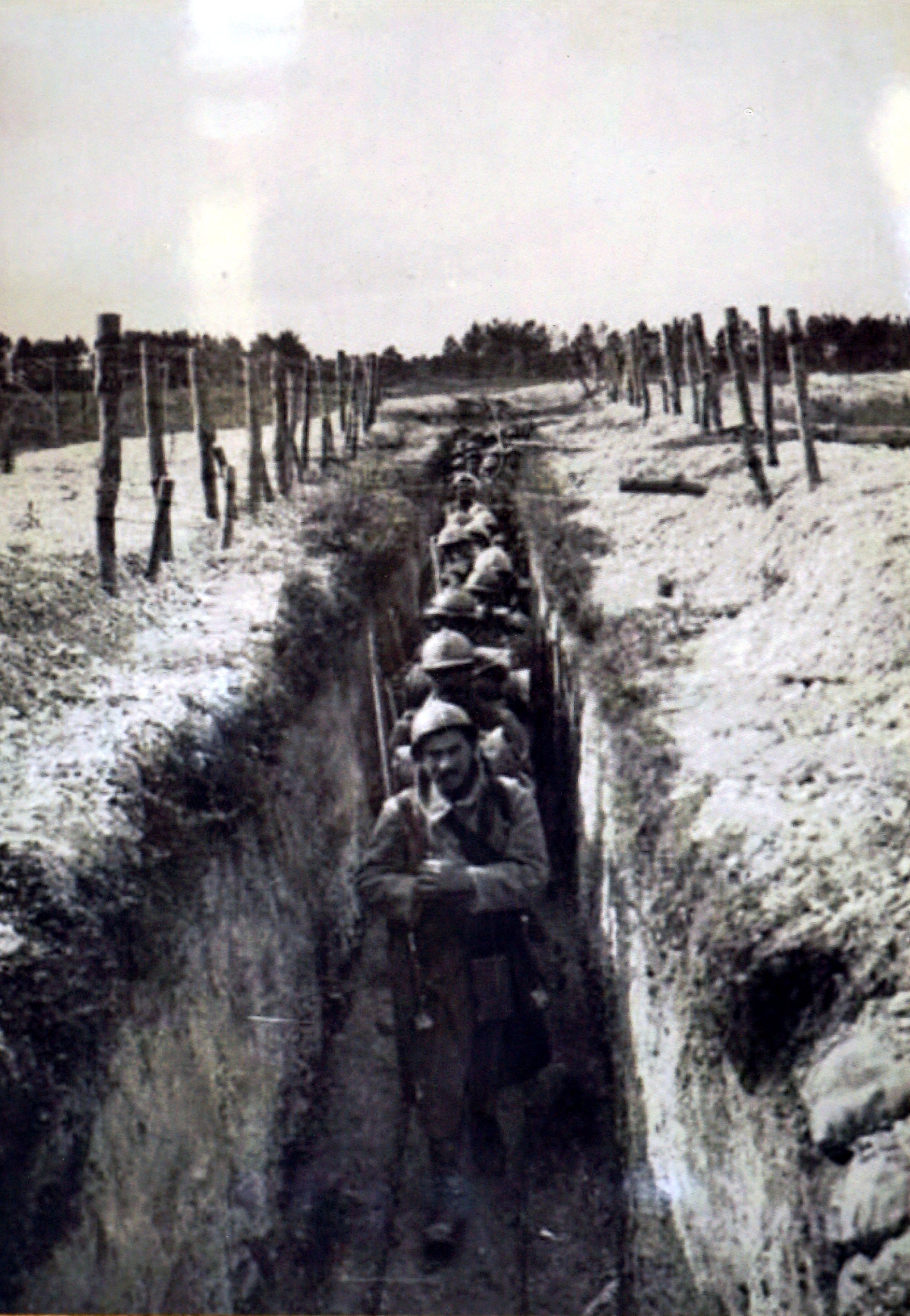
French trench in the rear during the Battle of the Hills.

- Battle of the Hills – As part of the Nivelle offensive, thirteen divisions with the French Fourth Army attacked an 11-kilometre (6.8 mi) front east of Reims, France defended by 17 divisions with the German Fourth Army, with the bulk of the fighting occurring around the trench lines code-named Konstanzlager.
- Second Battle of Gaza – Three infantry divisions with the Egyptian Expeditionary Force under command of Lieutenant-General Charles Macpherson Dobell attacked Ottoman-held Gaza, which was well-fortified with some 21,000 troops.
- British hospital ships Donegal and HMHS Lanfranc were torpedoed and sunk in the English Channel by German submarines, with each losing 40 passengers and crew.
- Vladimir Lenin's April Theses were published, and would become very influential in the following July Days and October Revolution.
- London newspapers The Times and the Daily Mail (both owned by Lord Alfred Northcliffe) printed atrocity propaganda of the supposed existence of a German Corpse Factory processing dead soldiers' bodies.
- American fighter pilot Edmond Genet was shot by anti-aircraft artillery and killed in France, the first American flier to die since the United States entered World War I.
- The Ukrainian Socialist-Revolutionary Party was established in Kiev.
- The River Forest Township was established in Cook County, Illinois.
- Born: José Soriano, Peruvian football player, goalkeeper for Club Atlético River Plate and the Peru national football team from 1940 to 1947; in Chiclayo, Peru (d. 2011)
- Died: Jane Barlow, 60, Irish poet, known for her collections including Irish idylls (b. 1857)

== April 18, 1917 (Wednesday) ==
- Battle of the Hills – French forces completed their capture of the Konstanzlager line.
- Second Battle of Gaza – After overrunning Ottoman outposts, British forces bombarded Gaza from land and sea before commencing frontal attacks east of the city and on the coast.
- Born:
  - Frederica of Hanover, German-Greek noble, queen consort for Paul of Greece; in Blankenburg, German Empire (present-day Germany) (d. 1981)
  - Brian Mason, New Zealand geologist and chemist, pioneered the study of meteorites found in the Antarctic; in Port Chalmers, New Zealand (d. 2009)
- Died: Moritz von Bissing, 73, German army officer, commander of the VII Corps for the Imperial German Army during World War I (b. 1844)

== April 19, 1917 (Thursday) ==
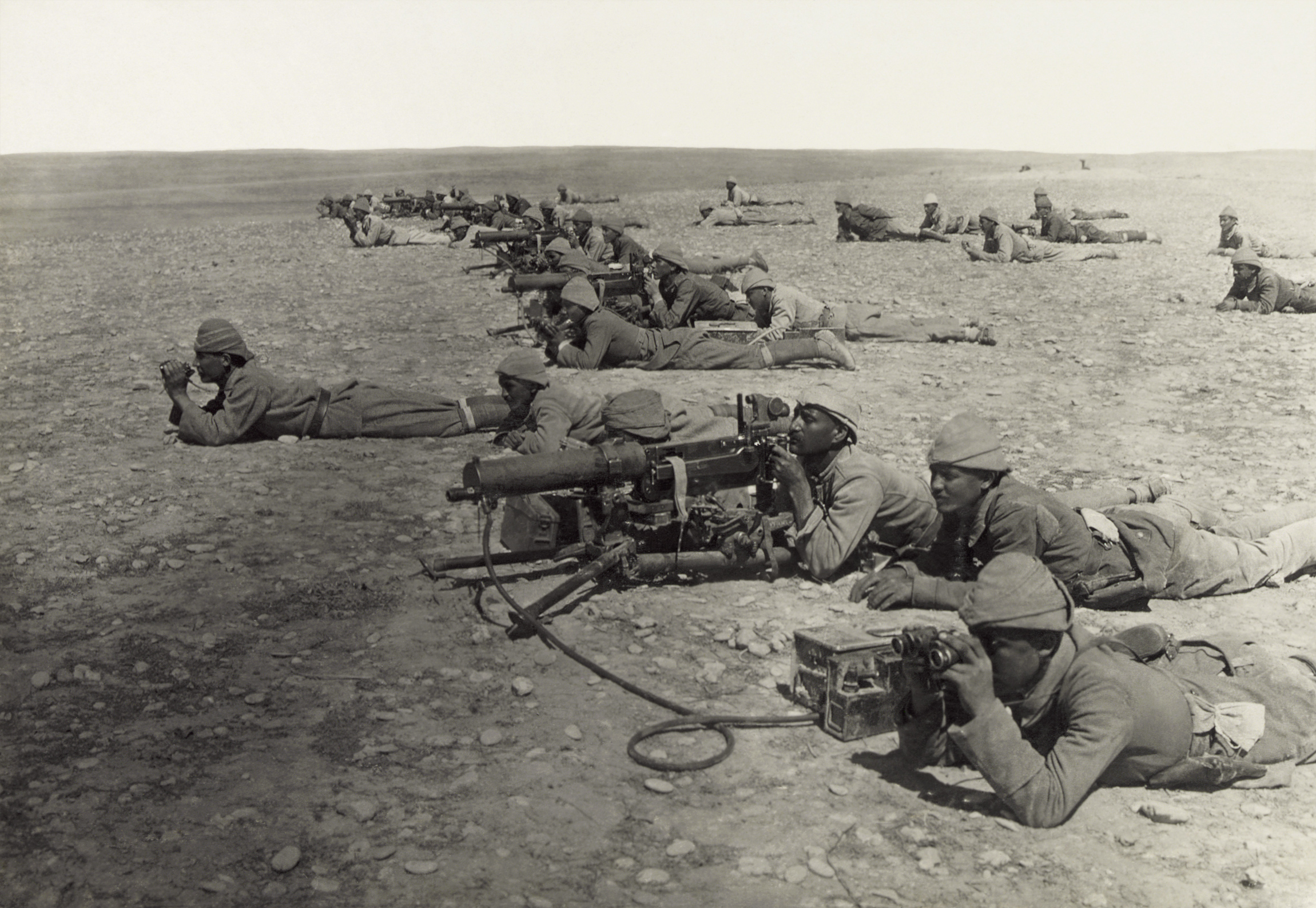
Ottoman machine gun corps defending Gaza against the British.

- Battle of the Hills – French forces captured the commune of Aubérive, France from the Germans.
- Second Battle of Gaza – The Egyptian Expeditionary Force failed to breach Ottoman defenses out of Gaza. With the cost heavy at 6,444 casualties and ammo running low, the attack was called off. Commander-in-Chief General Archibald Murray and Lieutenant-General Charles Macpherson Dobell were dismissed as a result and the stalemate in Southern Palestine began.
- U.S. Army transport ship Mongolia fired the first American shots in anger in World War I when her gun crew drove off a German U-boat in the English Channel seven miles southeast of Beachy Head, England.
- The All-Ukrainian National Congress was established in Kiev.
- German cruiser SMS Seeadler was destroyed in an accidental explosion after it was stripped down to a hulk in Wilhelmshaven, Germany. No casualties were reported but the wreck was never salvaged.
- Born: John Bushemi, American photographer, best known for his war photography during the Asiatic-Pacific Theater of World War II; in Centerville, Iowa, United States (d. 1944, killed in action)
- Died: Georgina Hogarth, 90, English literary editor, adviser and sister-in-law to Charles Dickens and editor of two volumes of his letters (b. 1827)

== April 20, 1917 (Friday) ==
- The Nivelle offensive took 20,000 German prisoners and 147 guns, but no breakthrough on the German front around Aisne was achieved.
- Battle of the Hills – French forces captured the commune of Bois Noir, France, ending most of the fighting in the area. The French suffered 21,617 casualties but had taken 6,120 German prisoners. German casualties were unknown.
- The Rikken Seiyūkai party led by Hara Takashi emerged as the largest party in the House of Representatives after winning 165 of the 381 seats in the Japanese general election.
- The United States Navy flew its first airship DN-1 at Pensacola, Florida. However, the aircraft proved to be a failure and test flights ended only nine days later.
- Born: Charles M. Williams, American academic, leading professor at the Harvard Business School for commercial banking; in Romney, West Virginia, United States (d. 2011)
- Died:
  - James Blenk, 60, German American clergy, Bishop of Puerto Rico from 1899 to 1906, and Archbishop of New Orleans from 1906 to 1917 (b. 1856)
  - David C. Montgomery, 47, American actor, best known for his stage role of the Tin Man in the 1902 Broadway musical The Wizard of Oz (b. 1870)

== April 21, 1917 (Saturday) ==
- Second Battle of the Aisne – The French Tenth Army was mobilized to assist the Fifth and Sixth Armies at Chemin des Dames, France, but the added manpower and equipment did little to break through the German line.
- Battle of Dover Strait – Royal Navy destroyers HMS Broke and Swift engaged a half dozen German torpedo boats involved in the Dover Barrage, sinking two of the vessels.
- German submarine SM UC-30 struck a mine and sank in the North Sea with the loss of all 26 crew.
- The Royal Navy destroyer Teazer was launched by John I. Thornycroft & Company in Southampton, England. It would serve with the Harwich Force for the remainder of World War I.
- Colorado industrialist Albert E. Carlton bought the Colorado Midland Railway after it declared bankruptcy for a second time.
- New York City Subway stations for the IRT Flushing Line, including Junction Boulevard, Rawson Street, Lowery Street, Bliss Street, 52nd Street, Woodside, 69th Street, Roosevelt Avenue, Jackson Heights, Elmhurst Avenue, and 103rd Street were opened for service.
- Born: Wu Zuguang, Chinese playwright and filmmaker, known for plays including City of Phoenix and Return on a Snowy Night, and films such as The Soul of the Nation; in Beijing, Republic of China (present-day China) (d. 2003)
- Died: F. C. Burnand, 80, English playwright, best known for his comic opera Cox and Box (b. 1836)

== April 22, 1917 (Sunday) ==
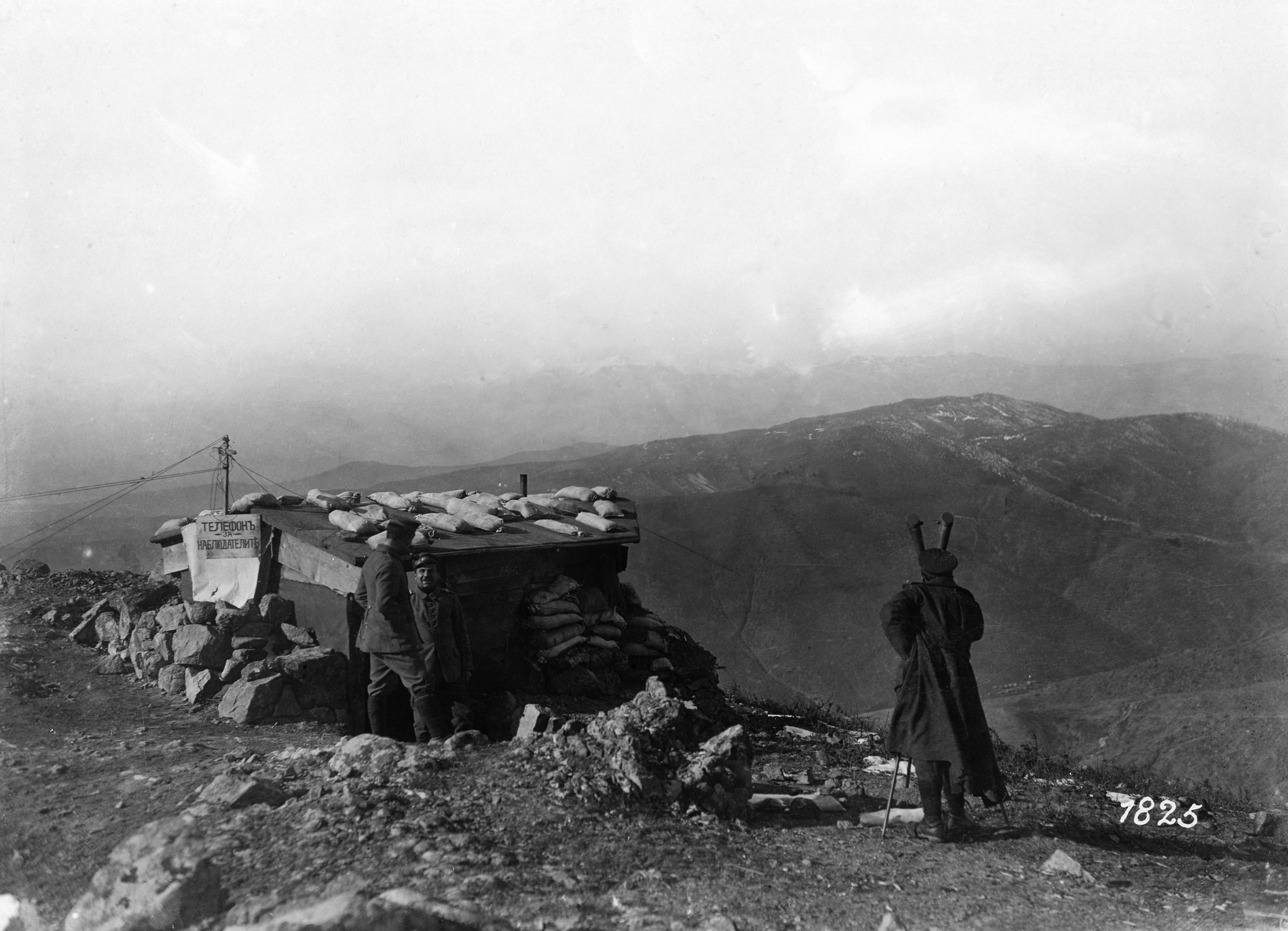
Bulgarian soldiers observing the enemy's position during the Battle of Doiran.

- Battle of Doiran – A British force of 43,000 men under command of Lieutenant-General George Milne engaged a Bulgarian force of 30,000 men commanded by Colonel Vladimir Vazov entrenched at Doiran Lake in Serbia, beginning with a bombardment that while massive in shells spent failed to do significant damage on Bulgarian defenses.
- British Foreign Secretary Arthur Balfour met with the U.S. government on a formal diplomatic mission to discuss the country's role in World War I.
- The Uruguayan football Club Plaza Colonia de Deportes was established in Colonia del Sacramento, Uruguay.
- Born:
  - Yvette Chauviré, French ballet dancer, considered one of the greatest performers with the Paris Opera Ballet, recipient of the Legion of Honour; in Paris, France (d. 2016)
  - Sidney Nolan, Australian artist, known for paintings including The Trial; in Carlton, Victoria, Australia (d. 1992)
  - Leo Abse, Welsh politician and activist, Member of Parliament for Pontypool from 1958 to 1983, leading advocate for gay rights; as Leopold Abse, in Cardiff, Wales (d. 2008)
- Died:
  - Anton Eilers, 78, American industrialist, co-founder of the American Smelting and Refining Company (now Asarco) (b. 1839)
  - Marijan Varešanin, 70, Croatian state leader, 7th Governor of Bosnia and Herzegovina (b. 1847)

== April 23, 1917 (Monday) ==
- Samarra offensive – British forces captured Samarra in Mesopotamia (now Iraq) and took control of the 130 km (81 mi) railroad that ran south to Baghdad, ensuring control of much of the region from the Ottoman Empire. British casualties were 18,000, along with 38,000 who had taken ill. Casualties from the Ottoman Empire were 15,000.
- Battle of Arras – The British Third Army launched new assaults against German-held positions along the Scarpe River, capturing the French villages of Guémappe, Gavrelle, and Cojeul.
- Buster Keaton made his film debut in the comedy short The Butcher Boy, which was also the first of Roscoe "Fatty" Arbuckle's series of films with the Comique Film Corporation.
- Born: Dorian Leigh, American model, considered one of the first supermodels; as Dorian Elizabeth Leigh Parker, in San Antonio, United States (d. 2008)
- Died: Robert Koehler, 66, German-born American painter, known for works such as Rainy Evening on Hennepin Avenue and First Snow Minnesota (b. 1850)

== April 24, 1917 (Tuesday) ==
- Battle of Arras – German counterattacks to regain lost ground around the Scarpe River failed.
- Battle of Doiran – British infantry launched a night attack against Bulgarian forces at Doiran Lake in Serbia.
- The U.S. Treasury issued the first liberty bonds through the Emergency Loan Act.
- German air force pilot Eduard W. Zorer completed the first ever close air support action against enemy troops, when he dropped his Halberstadt aircraft down to an altitude of 60 feet (18 meters) and fired 500 rounds from his machine gun on counterattacking British trenches during the Battle of Arras.
- German submarine U-43 sank the British passenger steamer Abosso in the North Atlantic Ocean northwest of Ireland, resulting in 65 casualties. Among the casualties were several officials from the Gold Coast, including E. V. Collins, Inspector General of Police and Prisons; Treasurer E. B. Reece; K. R. Chatfield, Provincial Engineer, Public Works Department; and J. R. Whitaker, Assistant District Commissioner.
- Washington Federal bank was established as the Ballard Savings and Loan Association and changed to its present name when it merged in 1958 with the Washington Federal Savings and Loan Association.
- Died: Gordon Alexander, 31–32, British Olympic fencer; killed in action at Villers-Plouich, France.

== April 25, 1917 (Wednesday) ==
- Morale among French infantry reached all-time lows as casualties from the Nivelle offensive reached 96,125, contributing to widespread mutinies in May.
- Battle of Doiran – Bulgarian forces pushed back British attacks.
- The Imperial German Navy cruiser SMS Dresden was launched by AG Vulcan Stettin in Hamburg.
- Thomas Lincoln Tally co-founded the First National Pictures Exhibitors Circuit.
- Born: Ella Fitzgerald, American jazz singer, best known for her hits "Dream a Little Dream of Me", "Cheek to Cheek", "Into Each Life Some Rain Must Fall", and "It Don't Mean a Thing (If It Ain't Got That Swing)", winner of 14 Grammy Awards and recipient of the Presidential Medal of Freedom; in Newport News, Virginia, United States (d. 1996)

== April 26, 1917 (Thursday) ==
- The Agreement of Saint-Jean-de-Maurienne was signed between France, Italy and the United Kingdom to settle interests in the Middle East.
- The Pacific Aero Products Company was renamed the Boeing Airplane Company.
- The city of Clifton, New Jersey, was incorporated, replacing the Acquackanonk Township.
- Born:
  - I. M. Pei, Chinese-born American architect, best known for his modern designs including the John F. Kennedy Presidential Library and Museum; as Ieoh Ming Pei, in Guangzhou, Republic of China (present-day China) (d. 2019)
  - Virgil Trucks, American baseball player, pitcher for the Detroit Tigers, St. Louis Browns, Chicago White Sox, Kansas City Athletics, and New York Yankees from 1941 to 1958; in Birmingham, Alabama, United States (d. 2013)
- Died: Mary Bangs, 54, American spiritualist, noted promoter of "spirit portraits" with sister Elizabeth, later proven to be a hoax (b. 1862)

== April 27, 1917 (Friday) ==
- Battle of Doiran – After three days of intense hand-to-hand combat, the British withdrew to their initial positions.
- A mine explosion in Hastings, Las Animas County, Colorado, killed 121 people.
- Romanian politician George Diamandy formed the Labor Party of Romania to focus on issues of land reform (some historians also attribute May 1 as the official date of the party's formation).
- Born: Tetratema, Irish race horse, thirteen-time race champion including the 2000 Guineas Stakes and July Cup in 1921; in Thomastown, Ireland (d. 1939)
- Died: Frederick Gutekunst, 85, German American photographer, best known for his portrait photography that included Abraham Lincoln, Grover Cleveland and Caroline Still Anderson (b. 1831)

== April 28, 1917 (Saturday) ==
- Battle of Arras – British and Canadian troops attacked the German-held French village of Arleux-en-Gohelle along the Souchez River.
- Flagler County, Florida, was established using portions of Saint Johns and Volusia counties, with its county seat in Bunnell, Florida.
- Norwegian sports club Flint was established in Tønsberg, Norway. The club currently hosts football, team handball, volleyball, track and field and table tennis.
- Born:
  - Minoru Chiaki, Japanese actor, best known for his collaboration with Akira Kurosawa in Rashomon, Seven Samurai and The Hidden Fortress; as Katsuji Sasaki, in Onnenai, Hokkaido, Empire of Japan (present-day Bifuka, Japan) (d. 1999)
  - Robert Cornthwaite, American actor, best known for starring in thrillers The Thing from Another World, The War of the Worlds, and What Ever Happened to Baby Jane?; in St. Helens, Oregon, United States (d. 2006)

== April 29, 1917 (Sunday) ==
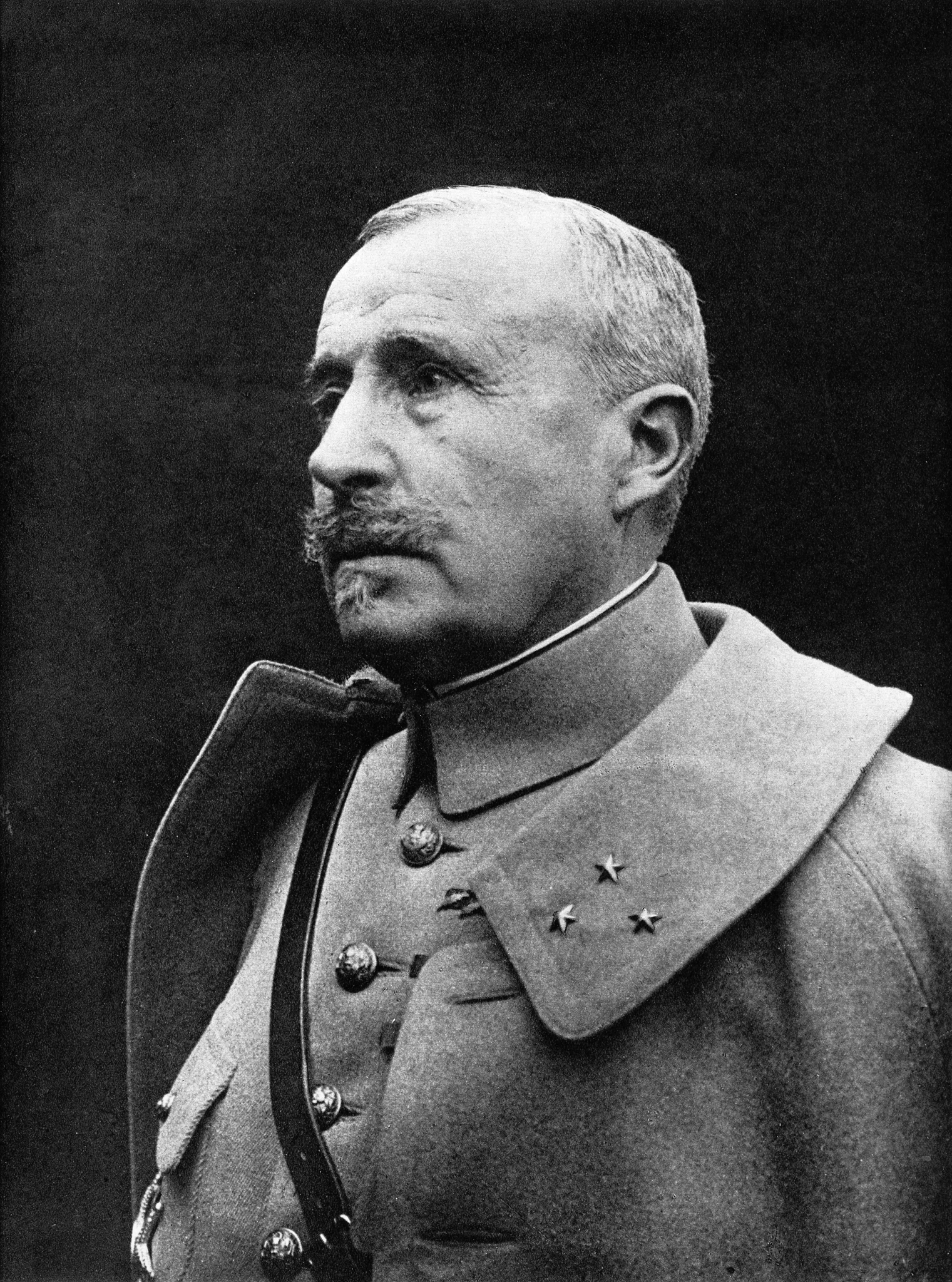
French General Robert Nivelle

- Robert Nivelle, commander-in-chief of the French armies on the Western Front, was now pressured to resign from his position as his planned offensive began to unravel.
- Battle of Arras – The 1st Canadian Division captured Arleux-en-Gohelle, France from the Germans.
- The first Moon Pie pastries were sold at Chattanooga Bakery in Chattanooga, Tennessee, at a nickel a piece.
- Born:
  - Celeste Holm, American actor, first female lead for the stage musical Oklahoma!, recipient of the Academy Award for Best Supporting Actress for Gentleman's Agreement and nominee for Come to the Stable and All About Eve; in New York City, United States (d. 2012)
  - Urie Bronfenbrenner, Russian-born American psychologist, developed the ecological systems theory for child development; in Moscow, Russian Empire (present-day Russia) (d. 2005)
  - Shirley Becke, British law enforcer, first British female police officer to attain Chief Officer rank; as Shirley Cameron Jennings, in Chiswick, London, England (d. 2011)
  - Fritz Loots, South African army officer, founder and first commander of the South African Special Forces; as Frederich Wilhelm Loots, in Britstown, Union of South Africa (present-day South Africa) (d. 2008)
- Died:
  - Florence Farr, 56, British actress activist, best known for her collaborations with George Bernard Shaw and a leading advocate of women's suffrage (b. 1860)
  - H. D. Harvey-Kelly, 26, British flying ace, first British pilot to land in France and first British pilot to shoot down an enemy aircraft, recipient of the Distinguished Service Order; died of wounds received in an enemy attack (b. 1891)

== April 30, 1917 (Monday) ==
- The Norwegian government established the Ministry of Industrial Provisioning to handle materials shortages during World War I.
- The Uruguayan football club Progreso was established in Montevideo.
- Born:
  - Bea Wain, American big band singer, best known for her hits "Deep Purple" and "Heart and Soul"; as Beatrice Ruth Wain, in New York City, United States (d. 2017)
  - Mervyn Wood, Australian rower, three-time Olympic medalist including gold for the 1948 Summer Olympics, silver of the 1952 Summer Olympics and bronze in the 1956 Summer Olympics; in Kensington, New South Wales, Australia (d. 2006)

== Sources ==
- The Times History of the War. Vol. XIV (online scan ed.). London: The Times. 1914–1921. OCLC 70406275 – via Archive Foundation.
