= Battle of Toboly =

1917 battle of the Eastern Front during WWI

- Part of Eastern Front of World War I
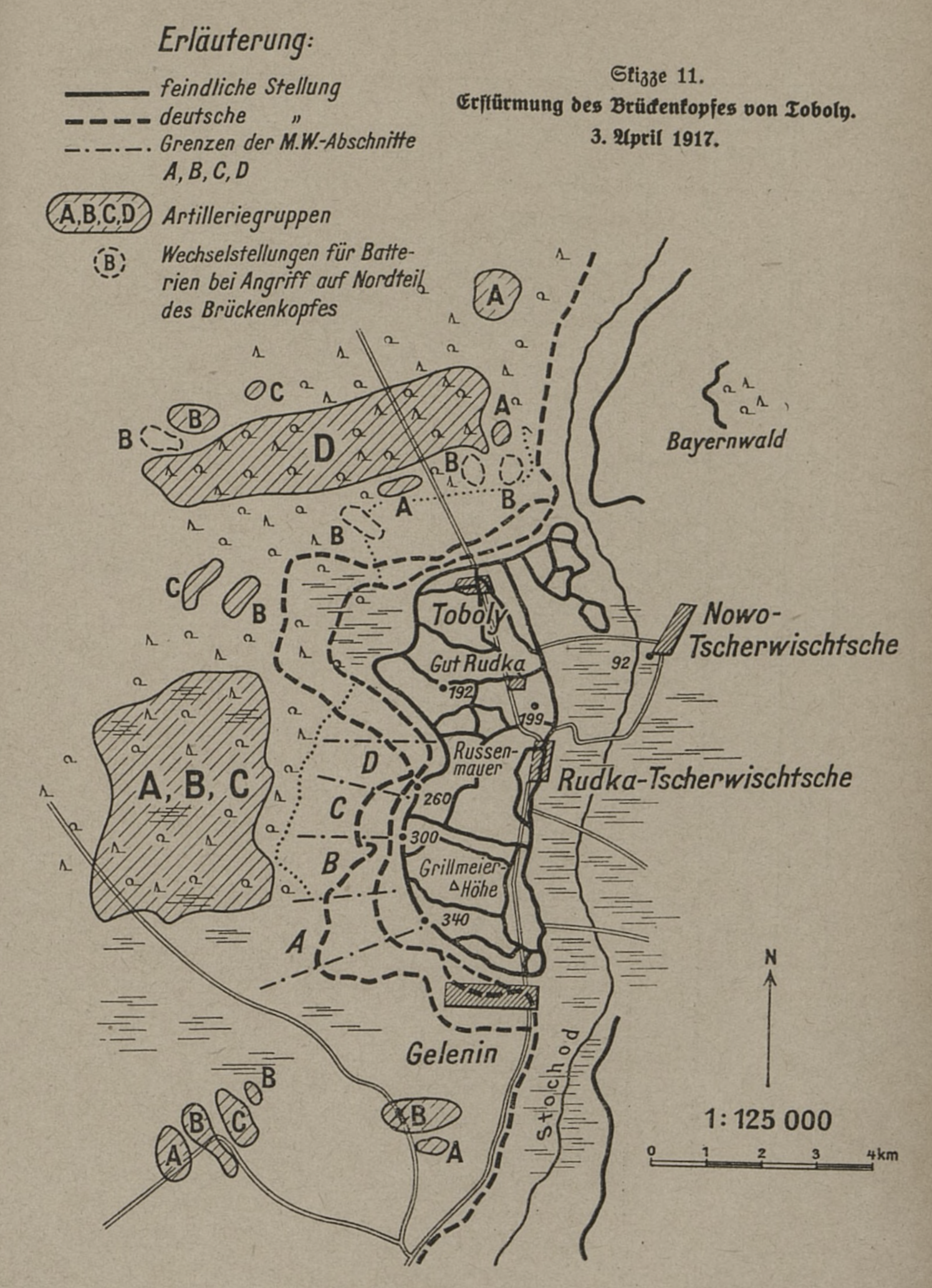
- German map of the storming of the Toboly bridgehead (1921)
Date	3 April 1917
Location	Toboly, nowadays Volynska Oblast, Ukraine 51°35′01″N 25°20′41″E
Result	Central Powers victory

Belligerents
German Empire; Austria-Hungary	(Russian Empire) Russian Republic

Commanders and leaders
(German Empire) Georg Bruchmüller; (German Empire) Prince Leopold of Bavaria; (German Empire) Albano von Jacobi; (Austria-Hungary) Leopold Freiherr von Hauer	(Russian Empire) ?

Units involved
(German Empire) 1st Landwehr Division; (German Empire) 86th Infantry Division; (German Empire) 91st Infantry Division; (Austria-Hungary) 26th Landwehr Division	(Russian Empire) 27th Infantry Division; (Russian Empire) 73rd Infantry Division; (Russian Empire) 5th Rifle Division

Strength
Unknown	Unknown

Casualties and losses
Unknown killed; Unknown wounded or missing	c. 400 killed; c. 3,000–9,500 captured; Unknown wounded or missing

The Battle of Toboly was a military engagement between the joint armies of Austria-Hungary and German Empire against the forces of Russian Republic in April 1917. In a rapid attack Central Powers troops were able to capture the enemy bridgehead over the Stochod river around the villages of Toboly and Helenin, Volynska Oblast, nowadays north-western Ukraine. Action also showed a successful strategy of coordination of infantry and artillery implemented by German general Georg Bruchmüller.

== Prelude ==
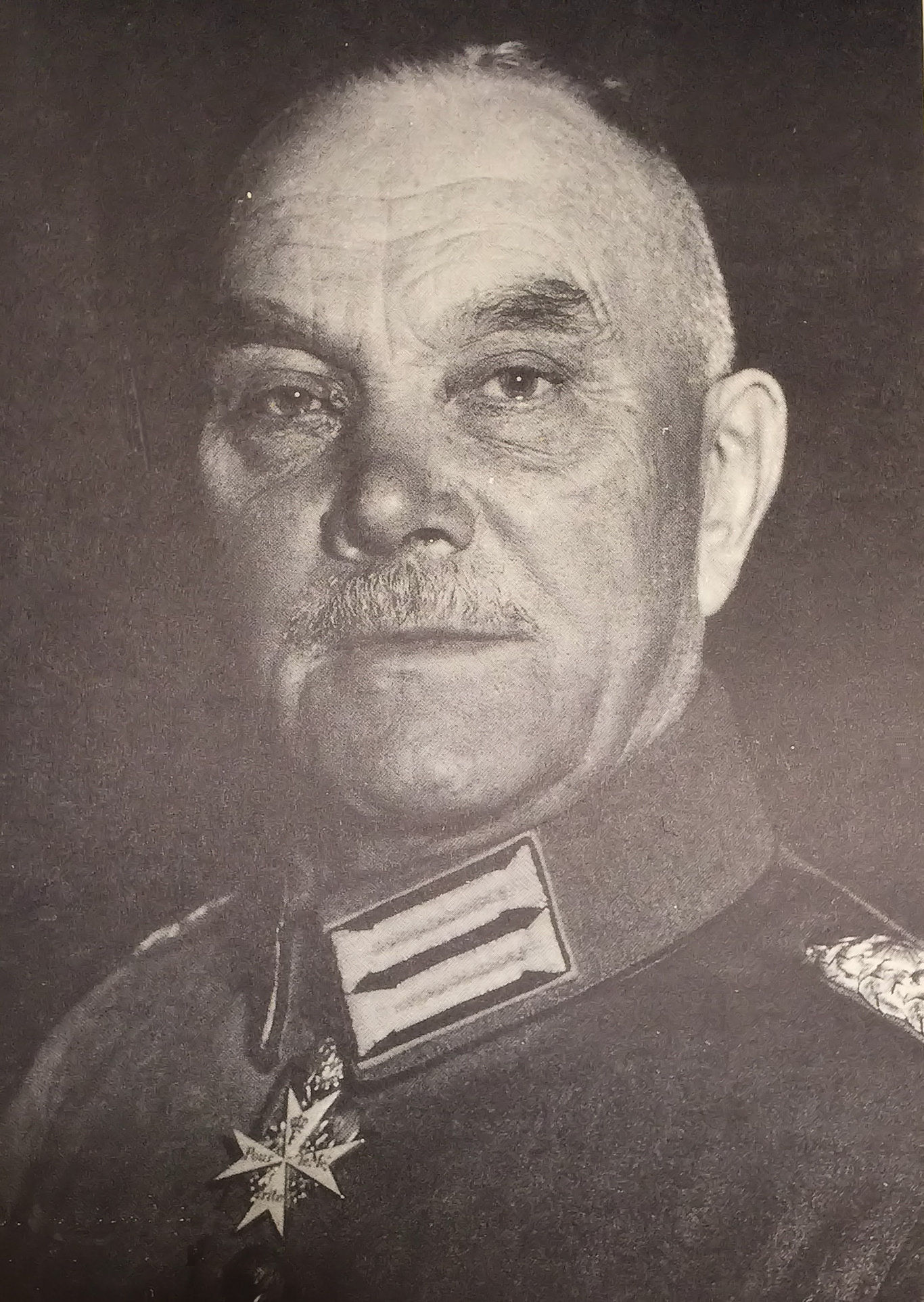
Georg Bruchmüller

During the Brusilov Offensive in the summer of 1916, in a front section defended by the troops of Austro-Hungarian 9th Cavalry Division of General Baron Leopold von Hauer Russian army succeeded in driving an eight-kilometer-wide bridgehead across the Stokhod near and south of the village of Toboly. This point could eventually serve as an important starting point if the Russian offensive had been resumed. To support Central Powers positions there the German 1st Landwehr Division under the Infantry General von Jacobi was deployed.

In the autumn of 1916, Colonel General von Linsingen had ordered preparations to be made for the recapture of the Russian positions west of the river. The attack originally planned for January 1917, but was postponed due to intense fighting at the other parts of the Eastern front. Operation was planned for two days, concentrating the attacking forces to the centre of Russian defense positions between the villages of Helenin and Toboly. Trenches around Helenin should be captured the first day, northern part of the bridgehead around and south of Toboly was to be reserved for a second day of fighting. German General Georg Bruchmüller, commander of 86th Infantry Division, artillery tactics specialist, led the preparations to cooperate the artillery support for the attacking infantry.

On 27 February all the troops reserved for the operation were gathered near Toboly bridgehead, including three infantry regiments from the 86th and 91st Infantry Divisions, and also some troops of the Austro-Hungarian 26th Landwehr Division. The 91st Infantry Division and the German 9th Cavalry Division were attached to the northern wing of the battlefield to support the main attack. Central Powers Artillery disposed with 75 batteries of 285 guns, as well as around 100 mortars. Attackers were facing Russian 27th and 73rd Infantry Divisions and the 5th Rifle Division, who were deposed to defend the bridgehead.

Further proceeding of the attack was again delayed due to the February Revolution in Russia, as the Central Powers waited for the political result of this governmental crisis, and also the spring floods on Stochod, in some places replacing the river with the water surface about one kilometer wide.

== Battle ==
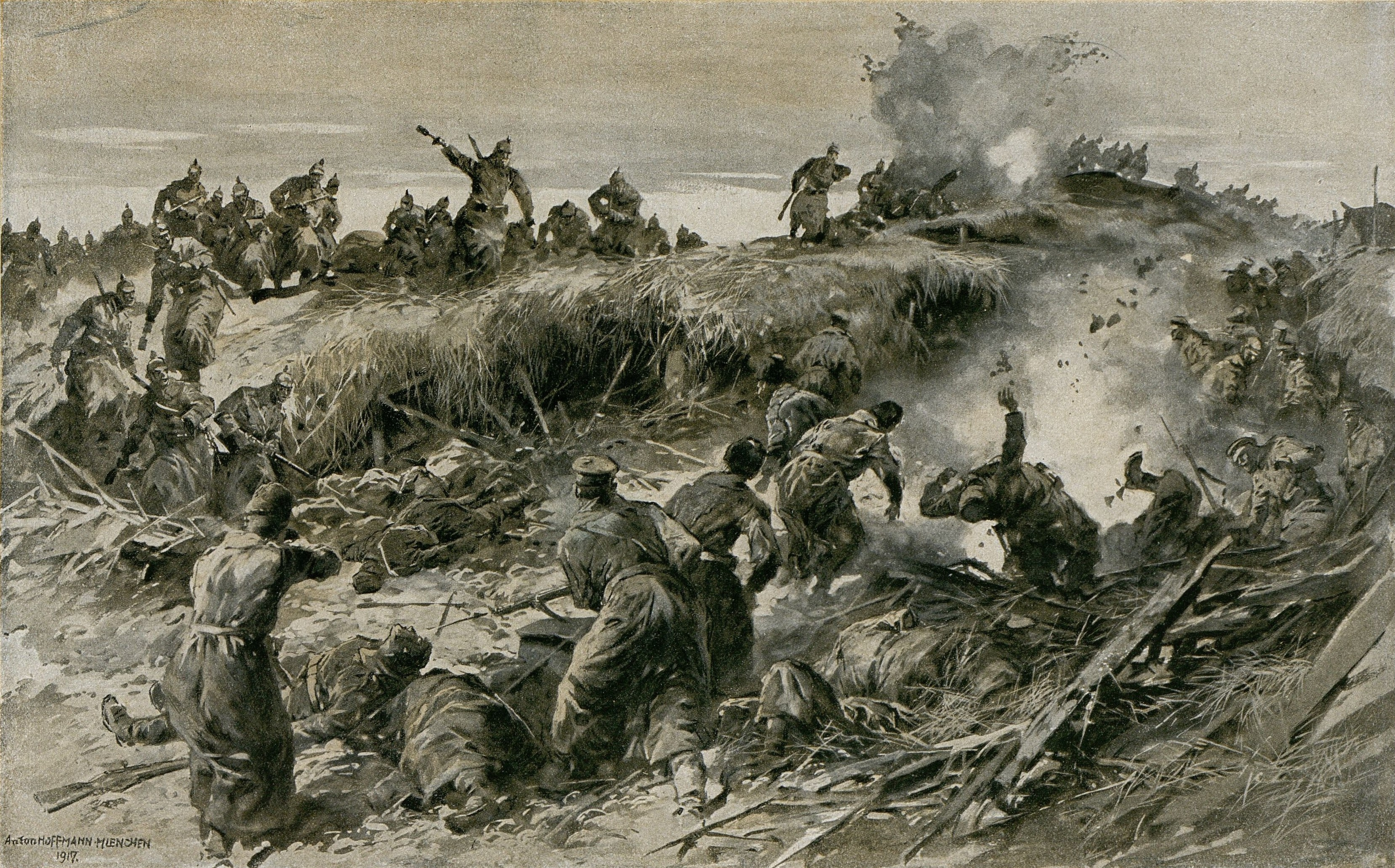
Depiction of the battle by German painter Anton Hoffmann

At the very beginning of April 1917 German general Iacobi finally decided that the attack. On 3 April at 6 a.m. artillery barrage started announcing the infantry attack, which started on 3 April at 6 a.m. Troops supported by the artillery and also visually covered by the smoke grenades round were advancing and around 2 p.m. reached and recaptured the Austro-Hungarian position at Stochod from the summer 1916. The Russian forces completely surprised by the enemy action weren't able to effectively resist and also couldn't depend on their artillery, which rounds showed to be imprecisely targeted. Until 8 p.m. German troops possessed positions in the villages of Helenin, Rudka Czerwiszeze and in the evening finally Toboly, also securing a certain area on the eastern bank of Stochod.

Germans declared enemy losses of about 400 men, some drowned during the retreat in flooded Stochod, 3 000–9 500 captured, 10 to 15 guns, 90 machine guns and 42 mortars.

== Aftermath ==
Central Powers victory secured their position on the Ukrainian front sections for next several months, until Kerensky offensive in July 1917. German high command, including Chief of German staff Erich Ludendorff, and German Chancellor were informed about this success and also German and Austro-Hungarian media celebrated that as an important military achievement. Nevertheless, on 5 April General Ludendorff informed the Commander-in-Chief East that there is by no means the intention of the Supreme Army Command to proceed any other promising operations to improve the position on the Eastern Front, although they were quite useful in clarity a weak state of the Russian army forces. Russian high command informed about their defeat on 5 April.

=== Rewards ===
Successful attack plan contributed to the decision of Bruchmüller's awarding of Pour le Mérite, Germany's highest military award, on 1 May 1917. Bruchmüller became one of only four senior artillery officers to receive this honor during the World War I.

== See also ==
- Brusilov Offensive
- Kerensky Offensive
- Ukraine in World War I

== Bibliography ==
- Der Weltkrieg 1914–1918. Dem deutschen Volke dargestellt. Band 2. p. 104. Tradition W. Kolk, Berlin 1929.
