= Dominique Willem Berretty =

Dutch journalist and entrepreneur

- Born: November 20, 1891; Djokjakarta, Dutch East Indies
- Died: December 20, 1934 (aged 43) near Rutbah Wells, Kingdom of Iraq
- Occupations: Journalist, media entrepreneur
- Known for: Founder of Aneta, Dutch East Indies’ first news agency
- Spouse: 6 marriages
- Children: Several, including son Dodo

Dominique Willem Berretty (20 November 1891 – 20 December 1934) was a journalist, media entrepreneur from the Dutch East Indies. He was the founder of Aneta, the first news agency in the Dutch East Indies (now Indonesia). Berretty was one of the most prominent media figures in the colonial Dutch East Indies before World War II.

He died at the age of 43 in the 1934 KLM Douglas DC-2 crash.

== Personal life ==
Berretty was born in Djokjakarta, Java, in 1891. His father was Dominique Auguste Leonardus Berretty, a teacher and head of a private school and his mother was Marie Salem. His father was of Indo-European descent, and his mother was Javanese. Despite the social divide between races in the colony, Berretty embraced both sides of his heritage. At a reception for the governor-general, he famously appeared arm-in-arm with his mother in traditional Javanese attire.

Berretty was married six times. From his marriage to the actress Mien Duymaer van Twist, which lasted from April 1925 to November 1928, he had a son and a daughter.

Berretty was known for his ambition and restlessness. His friend and Aneta director Herman Salomonson described him as a brilliant but lonely man, always chasing an undefined goal. His six marriages and frequent affairs were widely gossiped about in colonial society.

== Career ==
=== Education ===
After attending MULO and briefly studying at HBS, he left home at age 17 to work in Batavia. His first job was as a postal clerk for the colonial PTT, where he learned the technical infrastructure of telegraphy.

=== Rising career ===
In 1910, Berretty was hired as a proofreader by Karel Zaalberg at the Bataviaasch Nieuwsblad, where he soon became a city reporter. Around 1915, he worked as an editor at the Java-Bode, also based in Batavia.

Inspired by a 1916 trip to the United States, especially a visit to San Francisco's telephone exchange, Berretty founded the Algemeen Nieuws- en Telegraaf-Agentschap later known as Aneta on 1 April 1917; with borrowed money including from painter, editor, and art critic Henry van Velthuysen. At the time, news arrived in the Dutch East Indies with delays via telegraph cables. For the raw materials trade between the Indies and the Netherlands, timely information was of great value. His experience with telegraph lines from his postal job helped him build a robust network to distribute news across the colony and to the Netherlands. Including using a network of correspondents, he managed to transmit news significantly faster than his competitors.

In the spring of 1919, Berretty acquired his two main competitors in the Indies, establishing Aneta’s news monopoly in the colony. He signed contracts with local newspapers to supply them with telegraphed news at fixed rates. Additionally, he ensured the newspapers included content favorable to the colonial administration, maintaining good relations with authorities. This success and monopoly brought him great wealth. He became known as "the gossip king of Bandoeng." In 1920, Berretty inaugurated the Aneta Building in the Weltevreden district of Batavia, at the time the tallest in the colony.

=== Decline ===
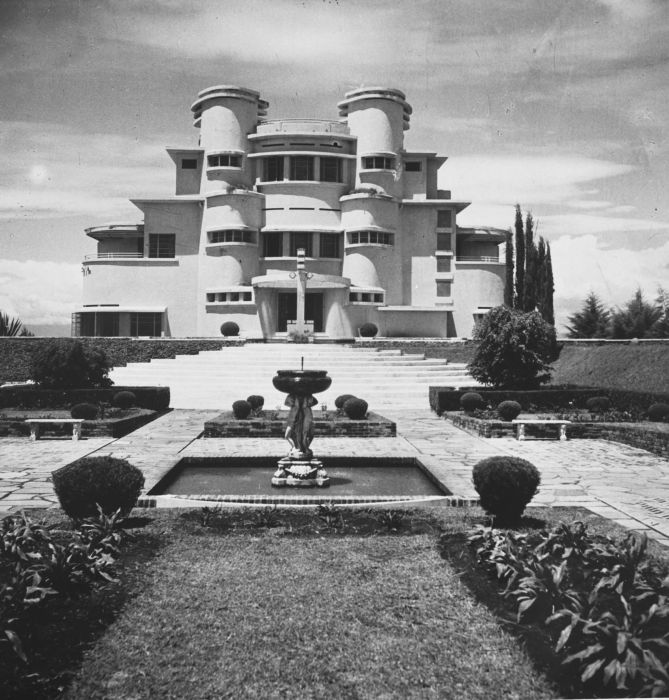
Last residence of Berretty, Villa Isola in Bandoeng

As communication lines became faster and more numerous in the 1920s, Berretty gradually lost his monopoly. Envy and growing criticism also began to take a toll. In response, he launched the publication De Zweep in 1920, writing sharp, biting pieces under the pseudonym Jan Karwats. Distribution of the paper was made mandatory for other newspapers—failure to comply would result in being cut off from news supplied by Aneta. After losing a lawsuit, he sold De Zweep in 1923. It continued as D'Oriënt, a friendlier and illustrated weekly magazine.

In 1930, due to the dominance of his news agency, the colonial government launched an investigation into Aneta, concluding that Berretty had abused his power. His public image suffered, and he turned his attention to the construction of Villa Isola near Bandoeng, considered at the time to be the most beautiful and modern house in the Indies. It was completed at the end of 1933 and still exists today. The villa was designed by architect C.P. Wolff Schoemaker, known for several striking buildings in Bandoeng.

== Style and public image ==
Berretty became a symbol of success and modernity. He owned luxury cars, boxed and fenced, and had a reputation as a djago—a fearless leader and man of action in Indo culture. He was often surrounded by women and married six times. His public behavior often attracted both admiration and criticism.

== Controversy and criticism ==
Berretty's agency faced accusations of monopolistic practices and biased reporting, especially in suppressing Indonesian nationalist news. In 1930, the Dutch parliament investigated Aneta and found serious abuses but also praised its importance. He retained his position.

It is said that Berretty was a Japanese spy, but this has never been verified. Berretty owned a magazine with a huge circulation where he wrote slander himself. That Berretty was in Japanese service could be argued from the fact he always paid slander fines in the Dutch East Indies in Japanese yen. Berretty’s owned Villa Isola was said to be funded by the Japanese secret service. It was said that the tennis court was so firmly founded that there could be stationed a field artillery battery. As Berretty tried to do business with the Germans, it remains unknown if Berrretty worked with the Japanese; with the Germans; with both or with neither. According to newspaper Het Vrije Volk it was “most likely” he worked as a double spy for the political intelligence service in Batavia.

== Death ==
On 19 December 1934, Berretty boarded from Schiphol the KLM aircraft Uiver, heading back to Java for Christmas. Tragically, the plane crashed the following night near Rutbah Wells, Kingdom of Iraq and burned down. Nobody survived the crash. Berretty died at the age of 43.

=== Unverified crash theory ===
Reuters journalists' stories from the crash location were forwarded to England. These long press releases contained other information than the official readings. At Schiphol, Berretty was the last passenger who boarded the airplane, after he arrived by plane from London. According to the Reuter story he made a nervous and hurried impression. He would have told pilot Wim Beekman he was a Japanese spy, who was chased by the English police, because he had top secret documents with him. Berretty would have offered Beekman f. 50.000 and later f. 100.000 if he would an emergency landing in the desert instead of landing in Baghdad; at the time British property where Berretty would be arrested. In Cairo, pilot Beekman would have called KLM director Plesman to discuss the situation. Plesman would have ordered Beekman to continue as planned. While flying over the desert, Berretty would have shot and shortly after the airplane crashed. According to Reuters, there were bullet-shaped holes in the wing; which were attributed to lightning in the official report.

Frans van Reijsen was Head of the Rijksluchtvaartdienst in 1984. His predecessor had told him that Berretty would be arrested in Baghdad. He had heard from people from Indonesia that Berretty would be a Japanese spy. He stated that no gunshot wounds were found during the autopsy. According to Van Reijsen it's unlikely there was a shooting because if there had been a shooting, that would have been favored by Plesman as the reason for the crash.

=== Funerals ===
A memorial service was held for the crew and passengers. All victims were buried at the English cemetery in Baghdad on 23 December 1934. They were however exhumed again, on 22 January 1936. With the "Drachenfels" they were transported to the Netherlands. Beekman was reburied on 1 April 1936 together with other crew members in a communal grave at the Zorgvlied cemetery in Amsterdam, as often happened after deadly KLM flying accidents.

== Legacy ==
In 2018, a biography about him was published.
