= Villa Isola =

Building in Bandung, West Java, Indonesia

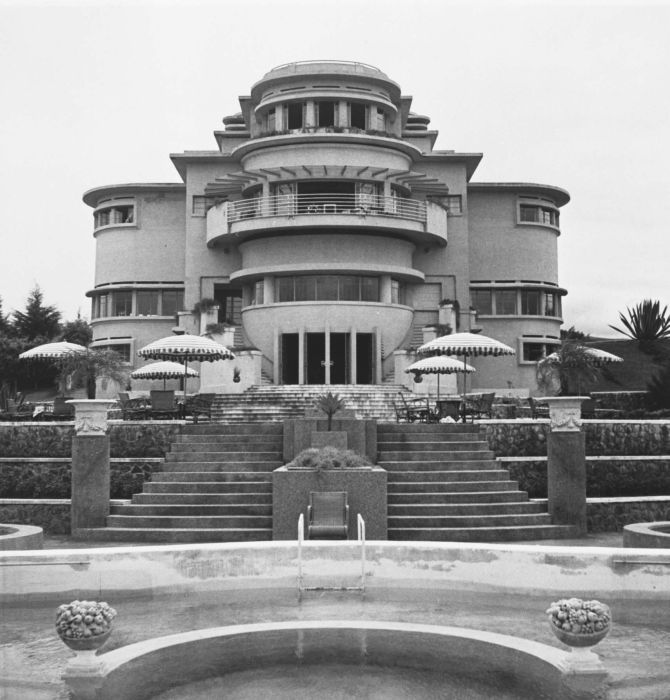
- Frontal view (ca.1933-40)

- Location within Java Villa Isola (Indonesia)

General information
- Architectural style: Art-deco
- Location: Bandung, Indonesia
- Coordinates: 6.861°S 107.594°E
- Construction started: October 1932
- Completed: March 1933
- Cost: 500,000 guilders
- Client: Dominique Willem Berretty

Design and construction
- Architect: C.P. Wolff Schoemaker

Villa Isola (now Bumi Siliwangi) is an art-deco building in the northern part of Bandung, the capital of West Java province of Indonesia. Overlooking the valley with the view of the city, Villa Isola was completed in 1933 by the Dutch architect Wolff Schoemaker for the Dutch media tycoon Dominique Willem Berretty, the founder of the Aneta press-agency in the Dutch East Indies. The original purpose of the building was for Berretty's private house, but then it was transformed into a hotel after his death and now it serves as the rectorate building of Indonesia University of Education.

== Construction ==
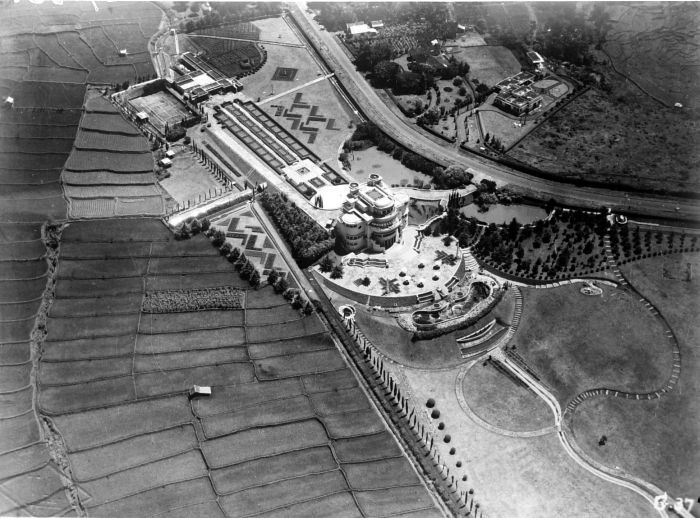
Aerial view 1937

Villa Isola was constructed within six months (October 1932 — March 1933), which was quite fast at that time. The foundation was built of steel and concrete was used to fill the skeleton and the floors between iron bars. The Villa Isola complex consists of the building itself and two large gardens and it covered an area of about 120,000 square metres (1,300,000 sq ft).

The total cost to build the complex was about 500,000 guilders, despite the fact that Dominique Berrety almost went bankrupt. The building was celebrated during the opening ceremony in December 1933. Berretty invited several journalists and friends to show his new villa. The guests were impressed by the meticulous details of the decoration. The rooms were filled with warm furniture, Venetian crowns and paintings of famous Indies and western painters. There were a reception room, a dining room, a wide billiards room, a study room, sleeping rooms, family room with a balcony, open terraces at both west–east sides, and a cozy bar equipped with a movie projector. A placard with "M’ISOLO E VIVO" (I isolate myself and live) sign is adorned on the wall above the reception room.

Berretty lived there only for a few months before he died in a plane crash in Syria on the DC-2 Uiver Batavia—Amsterdam flight in December 1934. The building is still standing without major changes, except for its usage and its surrounding environment. Villa Isola was transformed first into a hotel. During the Japanese occupation in Indonesia, the building was used as the Japanese army's headquarters for Bandung in 1942. After the Indonesian independence, Villa Isola was renovated with one more floor added on top of the roof and the name was changed into "Bumi Siliwangi". In October 1954, the then Indonesia minister of education Mohammad Yamin designated the building and its surrounding complex for the new pedagogical institute in Bandung. The building still serves as the rectorate building of the Indonesia University of Education (Indonesian: Universitas Pendidikan Indonesia), while the surrounding complex is the campus of the university.

== Architecture ==
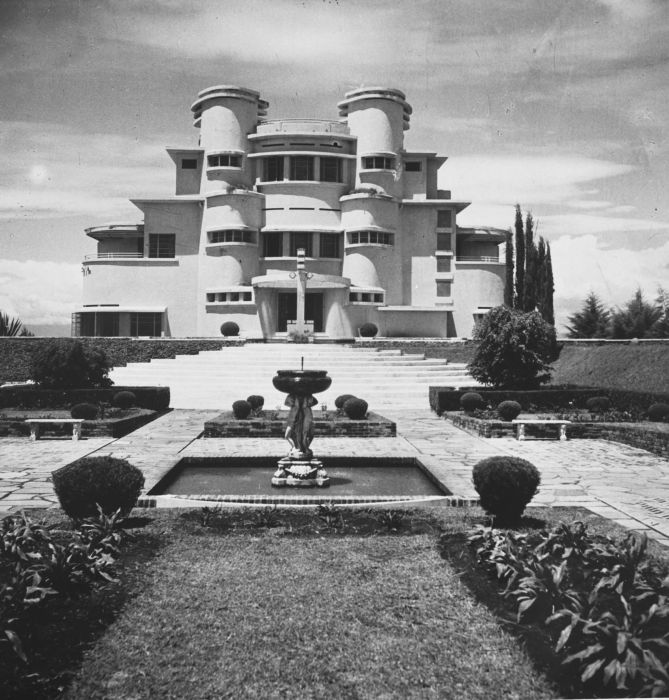
Villa Isola, northern facade and garden.

The design of the Villa Isola by the architect Wolff Schoemaker, was influenced by indigenous Javanese philosophy. The orientation of the building is according to the north—south axis, where the building faces Mount Tangkuban Perahu to the north and the city of Bandung to the south. Schoemaker was a firm follower of the art-deco style, which he mixed with local ornaments. Many circular shapes decorated the whole complex, the design of which reminds people of the shape of Candi in the east of Java. Circle is the main theme of the complex, both inside and outside the villa, including the gardens.

The main entrance is located at the center of the north facade shaded by a concrete canopy arch supported only by one pillar. The interior of the first floor consists of a lobby with a twisted staircase to the second floor, and a family room. A large window in a half-circled curve shape decorates the family room completed with an open balcony with a parapet of steel bars, with a panoramic view of the city. The family room is also equipped with a circular shape of toilet.

On the second floor, a master bedroom is located facing south, connected by two corridors to the west and the east terraces. Besides as connecting halls to the terraces, the west and east corridors function as "pipelines" to regulate air in the building, isolating the thermal condition of the tropical climate. Hence, the bedroom has a room temperature during the hot sunny days.

The third floor consists of guest rooms and an entertainment room (a bar). Due to the difference in height between the north and the south sides, the south side has an extra floor. The fourth floor in the south was mainly used as service area. Integrating a service area within a house was new at that time, as the usual colonial residential houses separated service rooms from the main house.

== Gardens ==
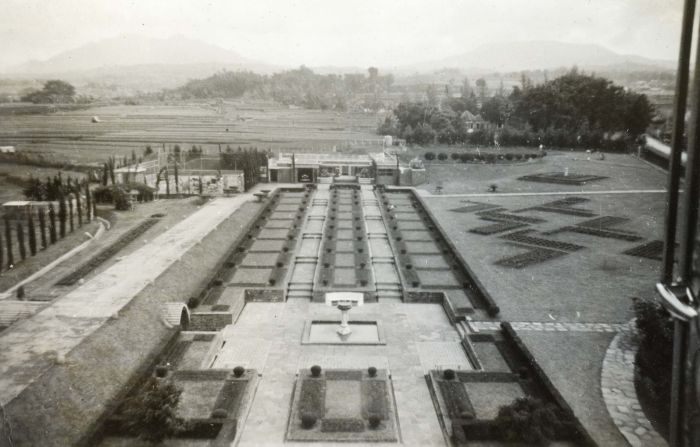
Gardens (1934-37)

Two gardens at different levels surrounded the complex. The higher north garden, was a European style garden with a rectangular pond and a statue in the middle. Orchard flowers dominated the garden and five black swans were specially imported to garnish the pond. A road divided the garden symmetrically to allow cars pass through from and to the garage. A half-circled staircase attached to the main building enhanced the symmetrical design of the garden.

The large south garden occupied most of the complex. Circular ornaments filled the south garden, starting from the building by another half-circled staircase. There are also similar staircases on the west and the east sides of the building. The garden was divided into circular areas whereas the building was positioned at the center of these circles, creating the impression that the building was an integral part of the garden.

== Rumors ==
Unverified stories exist that Dominique Willem Berretty was a Japanese spy and the villa was said to be funded by the Japanese secret service. It was said that the tennis court was so firmly founded that there could be stationed a field artillery battery.

== See also ==
- Indonesian architecture
