= Patriot Youth League of Sweden =

Sveriges fosterländska ungdomsförbund (Patriot Youth League of Sweden), an organization constituted on April 9, 1917, by representatives of the so-called National Democratic Youth Movement. The organization worked for preservation of monarchy and the official church.

One year after founding, the organization had 75 local units and around 6,000 members. An annual national meeting elected an eleven-member Central Committee which appointed a five-member Executive Committee. The organ of the organization was Nationaldemokraten (The National Democrat).

When Swedish speakers from Finland arrived to Sweden during the Finnish Civil War, the organization mobilized logistical support for them.
