= Java-Bode =

- Type: Daily newspaper
- Founded: August 11, 1852
- Language: Dutch
- Ceased publication: March 1957
- City: Batavia/Jakarta
- Country: Dutch East Indies, Indonesia

De Java-Bode was a newspaper that was published from 1852 to 1957 in Batavia in the Dutch East Indies.

== History ==
The newspaper was first published on August 11, 1852, initially appearing twice a week. Under editor-in-chief Conrad Busken Huet, the Java-Bode became a daily newspaper as of December 1, 1869. From March 1942 to 1949 publication was suspended due to the Japanese occupation of the Dutch East Indies. The last issue appeared in March 1957. Batavia was already Jakarta in independent Indonesia.

The newspaper had a liberal tone, but under Busken Huet it became more conservative. From 1932 onwards, under Henri Zentgraaff, who remained as editor-in-chief until 1939, the course even became very "right-wing", which was heavily criticized by the writer E. du Perron.

Well-known editors and journalists have been associated with the Java-Bode, including Conrad Busken Huet (editor-in-chief 1868-1873), Jan Eduard van Someren Brand (feuilleton writer from 1889), Dirk Verbeek (editor-in-chief until 1911), Dominique Willem Berretty (editor from around 1915), Johan Alberts (editor from around 1918), Herman Salomonson (editor-in-chief 1923-1926 and author of the Rhyme Chronicles section as Melis Stoke), Johan Ernst Jasper (editor-in-chief 1929-1932) and Alfred van Sprang (editor 1940-1942) .

== Archives ==
An important historical source, some of the Java-Bode archives are available in microfiche. They can also be accessed through Delpher, the digitized news paper portal of the Koninklijke Bibliotheek in The Hague.

== Literature ==
- H.F. Joël, Honderd jaar Java Bode: De geschiedenis van een Nederlands dagblad in Indonesië. Uitg. De Koninklijke Unie, Djakarta, 1952, 124 p.

== See also ==
- De Indische Courant

== Links ==
Wikimedia Commons
