= Georg Bruchmüller =

German artillery officer (1863–1948)

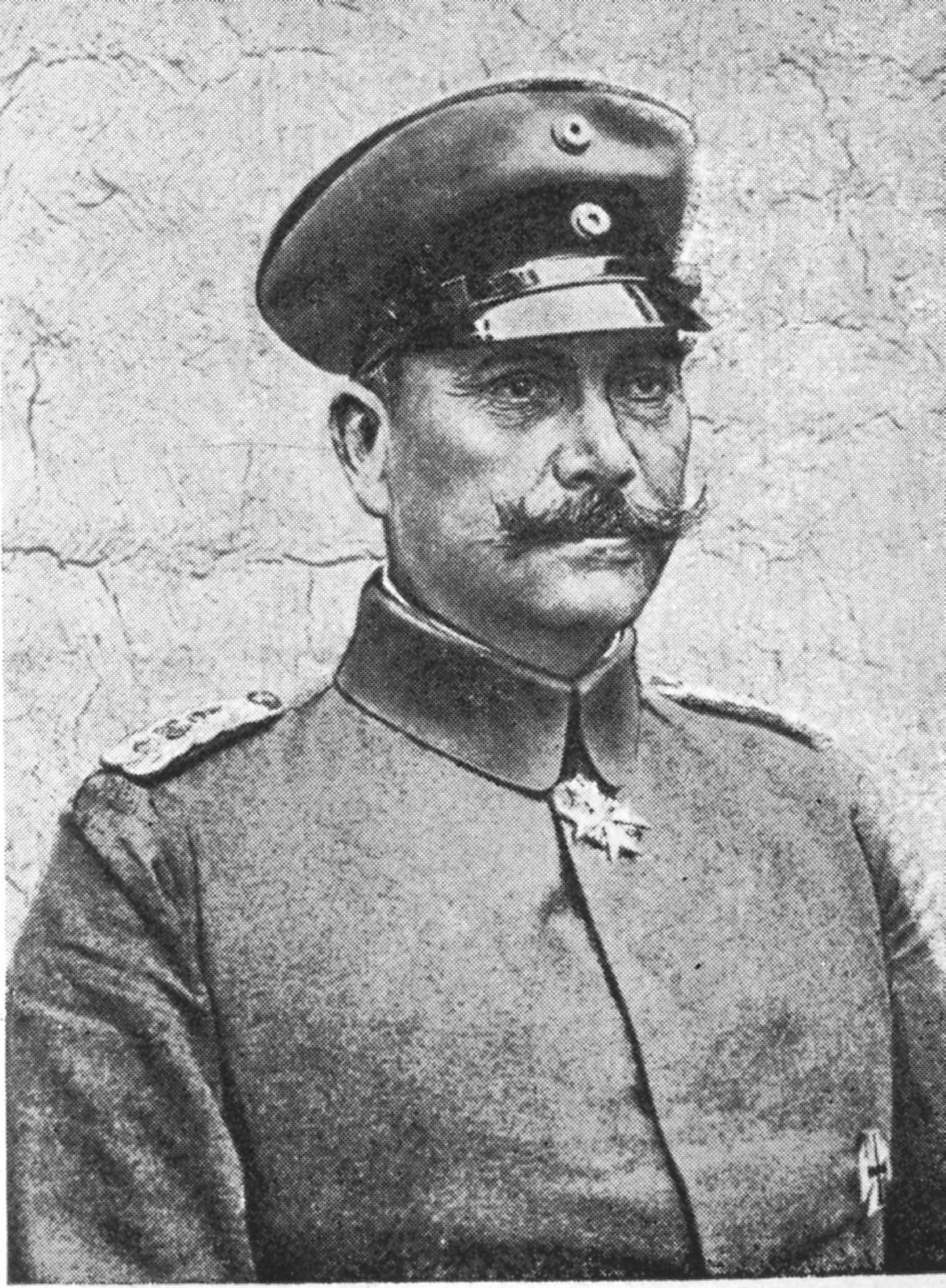
- Georg Bruchmüller, published June 1929
- Born: Georg Heinrich Bruchmüller; 11 December 1863; Berlin, Province of Brandenburg, Kingdom of Prussia, German Confederation
- Died: 26 January 1948 (aged 84); Garmisch-Partenkirchen, Bavaria, Allied-occupied Germany
- Military career
- Allegiance: German Empire
- Branch: Imperial German Army
- Service years: 1885–1919
- Rank: Colonel; Generalmajor (Tannenberg general)
- Nicknames: Durchbruchmüller (German: "Breakthrough Müller")
- Conflicts: World War I: Battle of Jugla, Battle of Riga (1917); Battle of Cambrai; Battle of St. Quentin (1918); Battle of Lys (1918); Third Battle of Aisne (1918), Chemin des Dames Offensive; Hundred Days Offensive (1918) 2nd Battle of Noyon; Champagne-Marne (1918)
- Awards: Pour le Mérite with Oak Leaves; Iron Cross 1st and 2nd class Prussian Military Service Cross; Albert Order, Officer's Cross with Swords (Saxony); Austrian Military Service Cross; Order of the Iron Crown, 3rd class (Austria); Military Merit Order, 3rd class (Bavaria); Hanseatic Cross (Bremen); The Honour Cross of the World War 1914/1918

Georg Bruchmüller (11 December 1863 – 26 January 1948) was a German artillery officer who greatly influenced the development of modern artillery tactics. He was nicknamed Durchbruchmüller, a combination of the German word Durchbruch (breakthrough) with his name.

== Early life ==
Bruchmüller was born in Berlin into a middle-class family. He studied physics at Berlin University; when he left in 1883, he became a three-year volunteer and officer candidate in the Prussian Army on 7 August 1883 serving with the Fußartillerie-Regiment „von Linger“ (Ostpreußisches) Nr. 1 in Königsberg. Two years later, he was commissioned in this Fußartillerie (foot artillery), the branch of the German army armed with heavier guns, howitzers and mortars, designed principally for siege warfare, which now was assuming a role in field operations.

In 1897 and 1898, Bruchmüller served as a battery commander in Fußartillerie-Regiment Nr. 3 in the Fortress of Mainz. Next, he commanded a battery in the Lehr-Bataillon (Demonstration Battalion) of the Royal Prussian Fußartillerie-Schießschule (Foot Artillery Firing School) in Jüterbog from 1901 to 1902. During this time, he worked with one of the instructors at the Fußartillerie-Schießschule, Hauptmann Arthur Bilse, a heavy artillery specialist. (Bilse, when General der Fußartillerie 15, was killed in action on New Year's Day 1916, at Les Baraques France.) In 1908, Bruchmüller was promoted to major and assigned to write the tactical manual for foot artillery.

On 14 September 1909, Bruchmüller was appointed commander of the 2nd Battalion of the Foot Artillery Regiment “von Hindersin” (1st Pomeranian) No. 2. He gave up this command on 30 September 1912 and then acted as a teacher at the foot artillery shooting school. Due to health problems (diabetes), he was medically discharged on 30 September 1913 and placed at disposal (z. D.; de facto retired) as a lieutenant colonel, but with major's pay.

== World War I ==
At the beginning of World War I, Bruchmüller was recalled to active duty and soon became artillery commander of the 86th Division on the Eastern Front. In 1915 he fought in thirteen actions, winning the Iron Cross First Class and Second Class. The Russians conducted the Lake Naroch Offensive from 18 to 30 March 1916. For the counter-attack, Bruchmüller persuaded the commander of the Tenth Army, Generaloberst Hermann von Eichhorn, to centralize the artillery command. Bruchmüller planned the leading of the infantry attack with a creeping barrage, which contributed to the German victory, for which he was awarded the Pour le Mérite, Germany's highest military award, in 1917 (one of only four senior artillery officers to receive this honor during the war).

The French and British used prolonged bombardments before an infantry assault, to try to destroy the defenders, like the seven-day barrage opening the Battle of the Somme, while the Germans favored short, intense bombardments, sometimes called hurricane bombardments, like the ten-hour barrage which opened the Battle of Verdun. Bruchmüller devised intricate, centrally-controlled firing plans for intense bombardments. His operations emphasized fire in depth throughout the enemy positions, switching rapidly from target to target and then back again, which required strict, detailed control of every gun, to cause maximum disruption of the defenders. Each battery of each type of weapon received fire missions on a timetable. The first stage hit headquarters, phone links, command posts, enemy batteries and infantry positions; the fire was sudden, concentrated, and made extensive use of gas shells. In the second stage, more guns engaged the enemy batteries; much firing was required (for example, 100 shells from 6 in (150 mm) howitzers were considered necessary to eliminate a gun pit). The third stage directed fire for effect on targets; some batteries continued to shell infantry positions, while heavy pieces engaged long-range targets to cut off reinforcements. Advancing infantry followed a precisely organized creeping barrage, the Feuerwalze. For some of the key counter-attacks during Russia's Brusilov Offensive, Bruchmüller directed the 76 artillery batteries of Heeresgruppe von Linsingen. In July 1917, he commanded 134 batteries during the counter-attack that recovered Tarnopol from the Russians, after its loss during the Kerensky Offensive.

Surprise was essential for creating maximum disruption, so Bruchmüller adopted the Pulkowski Method, for bombardments without the customary registration fire. The position of each gun was surveyed. Knowing the muzzle velocity of the gun, taking into account variables like air temperature, wind velocity and direction, using tables provided by mathematicians, and pre-registering guns on firing ranges, it was possible to fire fairly accurately at targets on the gunnery maps. The Germans concealed their attack preparations but their initial target data had to be precise. (The British had fired from the map in their assault at Cambrai on 20 November 1917.)

Bruchmüller commanded the artillery of the 8th Army (General Oskar von Hutier) in the victory at Riga in September 1917. The 8th Army moved west soon thereafter and, in the first months of 1918, Bruchmüller's techniques were taught to gunners at a special school in Belgium before the German spring offensive of 1918. Infantry officers were also taught his methods and there were joint infantry-artillery exercises with live ammunition, with advances shielded by the creeping barrage. The first attack, Operation Michael, began with a barrage of 3.5 million shells in five hours, almost 200 shells a second. Defying instructions, Bruchmüller eliminated preliminary registration by firing from the map and then directed the artillery during the next attack at the Battle of the Lys on Flanders, where the artillery had not yet been trained in the Pulkowski method. The guns were registered by observation during the first phase of the bombardment. Bruchmüller was awarded the oak leaves to his Pour le Mérite on March 26, 1918, one of just two higher artillery commanders decorated this way. Still only a lieutenant-colonel and a retired officer on temporary recall, he commanded the artillery in Heeresgruppe Deutscher Kronprinz in the Third Battle of the Aisne and the Second Battle of the Marne. The artillery fired from the map in darkness and the infantry advanced at first light. Ludendorff cited him as an example of "the decisive influence of personality on the course of events in war".

British military historian B.H. Liddell Hart said that Bruchmüller was "the greatest artillery expert of the war."

== Post-war ==
Bruchmüller was not eligible for the post-war Reichswehr, because the Versailles Treaty prohibited heavy artillery, and he was retired in 1919 as a full colonel. He wrote several books on artillery that were translated into English, French and Russian. In 1939, on the 25th anniversary of the Battle of Tannenberg, he was promoted to major-general on the retired list. Bruchmüller died at Garmisch-Partenkirchen in 1948.

== Cited works ==
- Broad, C. N. F. (1922). "Artillery Intelligence and Counter-Battery Work". Journal of the Royal Artillery. 49. Woolwich: Royal Artillery Institution. OCLC 4241960.
- Ludendorff, Erich (1920). My War Memories 1914–1918. Vol. II. London: Hutchinson. OCLC 804986618.
- "Rangliste der Königlich Preußischen Armee und des XIII. (Königlich Württembergischen) Armeekorps für 1902. Mit den Dienstalterlisten der Generale und Stabsoffiziere und einem Anhange enthaltend das Reichsmilitärgericht, die Ostasiatische Besatzungs-Brigade, die Marine-Infanterie, die Kaiserlichen Schutztruppen und die Gendarmerie-Brigade in Elsaß-Lothringen. Nach dem Stande vom 1. Juni 1902. Auf Befehl Seiner Majestät des Kaisers und Königs" [Ranking List of the Royal Prussian army and XIII. (Royal Württemberg) army corps for 1902. With the Official Age Lists of the Generals and Staff Officers and an Appendix Containing the Imperial Military Court, the East Asian occupation-brigade, the Naval Infantry, the Imperial Bodyguard and the Gendarmerie Brigade in Alsace-Lorraine. According to the state from 1 June 1902. On the Order of His Majesty the Emperor and King]. Preußen. Kriegsministerium. Geheime Kriegs-Kanzlei. Berlin: Mittler und Sohn. 1902. OCLC 72901312.
- Van der Kloot, William (2014). Great Scientists Wage the Great War: The First War of Science 1914–1918. Stroud: Fonthill. ISBN 978-178155-402-9.
- Sulzbach, Herbert (1981). With the German Guns. Four Years on the Western Front 1914–1918. Hamden, CT: Archon Books. ISBN 978-020801-964-6.
- "Vollständige Dienstaltersliste der Kavallerie-Offiziere der Königlich Preussischen Armee und des XIII. (Königl. Württ.) Armeekorps mit Angabe d. Datums d. Patente zu den früheren Dienstgraden" [Full Seniority list of Cavalry Officers of the Royal Prussian Army and XIII. (Royal. Württ.) Army Corps with information of Starting Date and Patents to the Earlier Grades]. Preußen Armee. Burg: Verlag von August Hopfer. 1898. OCLC 84738054.
- Zabecki, David T. (1994). Steel Wind: Colonel Georg Bruchmǔller and the Birth of Modern Artillery. Westport, Conn.: Praeger. ISBN 0-275-94750-5.
- Zabecki, David T. (1996). "Bruchmüller, Georg (1863–1948)". In Tucker, Spencer C.; Matysek Wood, Laura; Murphy, Justin D. (eds.). The European Powers in the First World War: An Encyclopedia. Garland Reference Library of the Humanities. Vol. 1483. New York: Garland. ISBN 978-081533-351-7.
- Zabecki, David T. (2006). The German 1918 Offensives: A Case Study in the Operational Level of War. Cass: Strategy and History. Vol. XVI. London/New York: Routledge. ISBN 978-041535-600-8.
