= 1st Landwehr Division (German Empire) =

1st Landwehr Division (1. Landwehr-Division)
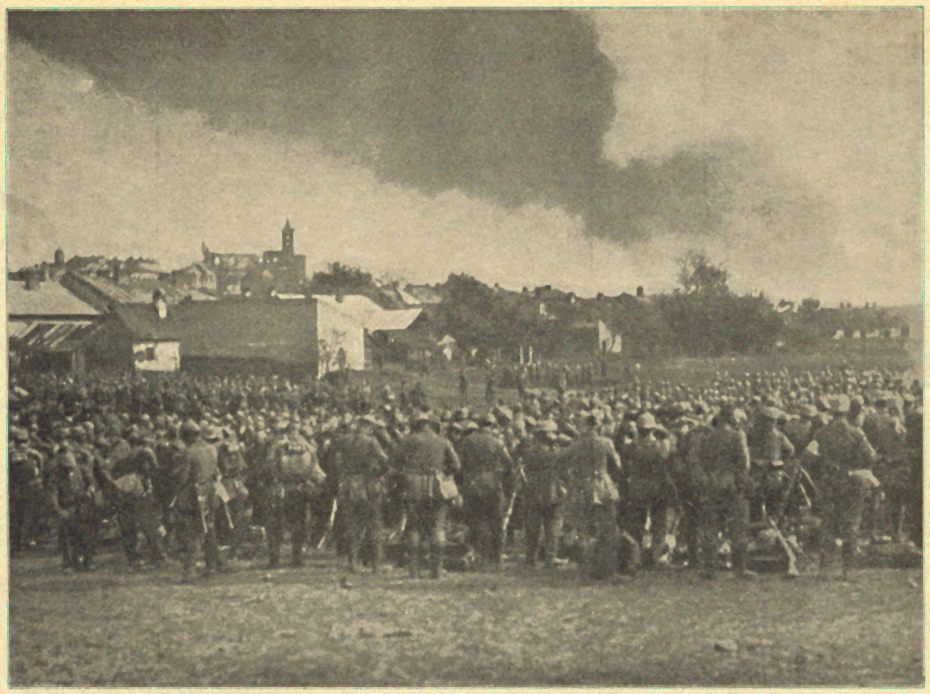
- Active: 1914-1919
- Country: Germany
- Branch: Army
- Type: Landwehr infantry
- Size: Approx. 15,000
- Engagements: World War I: Gumbinnen, Tannenberg, 2nd Masurian Lakes, Gorlice-Tarnów Offensive

The 1st Landwehr Division (1. Landwehr-Division) was an infantry division of the Imperial German Army during World War I. It was formed on the mobilization of the German Army in August 1914 under the "Higher Landwehr Commander 1" (Höherer Landwehr-Kommandeur 1) and, initially, also referred to as the "Landwehr-Division Goltz" after its commander. The Landwehr was the third category of the German Army, after the regular Army and the reserves. Thus Landwehr divisions were made up of older soldiers who had passed from the reserves, and were intended primarily for occupation and security duties rather than heavy combat.

== Organization at mobilization ==
On mobilization, the 1st Landwehr Division was created by aggregating four mixed Landwehr brigades (gemischte Landwehr-Brigaden), each of which generally included its own infantry, cavalry and artillery. Its initial wartime organization was as follows:

- 33rd Mixed Landwehr Brigade
  - Landwehr Infantry Regiment No. 75
  - Landwehr Infantry Regiment No. 76
  - 2nd Guard Landwehr Squadron
  - 1st Landwehr Squadron/IX Corps
  - 1st Landwehr Battery/IX Corps
- 34th Mixed Landwehr Brigade
  - Landwehr Infantry Regiment No. 31
  - Landwehr Infantry Regiment No. 84
  - 3rd Guard Landwehr Squadron
  - 2nd Landwehr Squadron/IX Corps
  - 2nd Landwehr Battery/IX Corps
- 37th Mixed Landwehr Brigade
  - Landwehr Infantry Regiment No. 73
  - Landwehr Infantry Regiment No. 74
  - 2nd Landwehr Squadron/X Corps
  - II. Landwehr Field Artillery Battalion/X Corps
- 38th Mixed Landwehr Brigade
  - Landwehr Infantry Regiment No. 77
  - Landwehr Infantry Regiment No. 78
  - 3rd Landwehr Squadron/X Corps

The 33rd and 34th Mixed Landwehr Brigades were raised in the IX Corps area (the Province of Schleswig-Holstein, part of the Province of Hanover, the Grand Duchies of Mecklenburg-Schwerin and Mecklenburg-Strelitz, and the Hanseatic Cities of Bremen, Hamburg, and Lübeck). The 37th and 38th Mixed Landwehr Brigades were raised in the X Corps area (the Province of Hanover, the Grand Duchy of Oldenburg, and the Duchy of Brunswick).

On 27 August, the division was ordered to reinforce the eastern front; however, the 37th and 38th Mixed Landwehr Brigades were left behind to guard the northern coast and later transferred to the western front.

== Combat chronicle ==
The 1st Landwehr Division began the war on the Eastern Front. In 1914-15, it participated in the battles of Gumbinnen, Tannenberg, and 2nd Masurian Lakes. It then took part in the Gorlice-Tarnów Offensive. The division was then primarily employed in positional warfare until the armistice on the Eastern Front. In early 1918, it was transferred to the Western Front, where it was primarily employed in positional warfare in Flanders and Alsace-Lorraine.

== Late World War I organization ==
Divisions underwent many changes during the war, with regiments moving from division to division, and some being destroyed and rebuilt. During the war, most divisions became triangular - one infantry brigade with three infantry regiments rather than two infantry brigades of two regiments (a "square division"). In the case of Landwehr divisions, the mixed Landwehr brigades were converted to regular infantry brigades before being triangularized, and were often used to form new units. The 1st Landwehr Division's order of battle on 15 January 1918 was as follows:

- 34th Landwehr Brigade:
  - Landwehr Infantry Regiment No. 31
  - Landwehr Infantry Regiment No. 33
  - Landwehr Infantry Regiment No. 84
  - 3rd Squadron, Light Cavalry Regiment No. 12
- Artillery Command 128:
  - Field Artillery Regiment No. 96
- Staff, Pioneer Battalion No. 401:
  - 1st Ersatz Company, Pioneer Battalion 'Prinz Radziwill' (East Prussian) No. 1
  - 2nd Landwehr Pioneer Company/II Corps
  - Mortar Company No. 301
- Divisional Signals Command 501
