= Pravda Severa =

Правда Севера
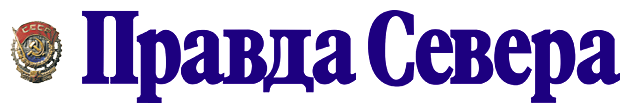
- Type: regional broadsheet
- Founded: 1 April [O.S. 19 March] 1917
- Language: Russian
- Headquarters: Arkhangelsk
- Circulation: 7,000-20,500
- Website: www.pravdasevera.ru

Pravda Severa (Russian: Правда Севера, lit. 'Truth of the North') is a Russian Arkhangelsk-based newspaper, published since 1917. It is issued three times a week on Tuesday, Wednesday and Saturday in the A3 format. The Wednesday circulation is 20,050 copies, with 7,000—8,000 copies on Tuesday and Saturday.
