= Herman Salomonson =

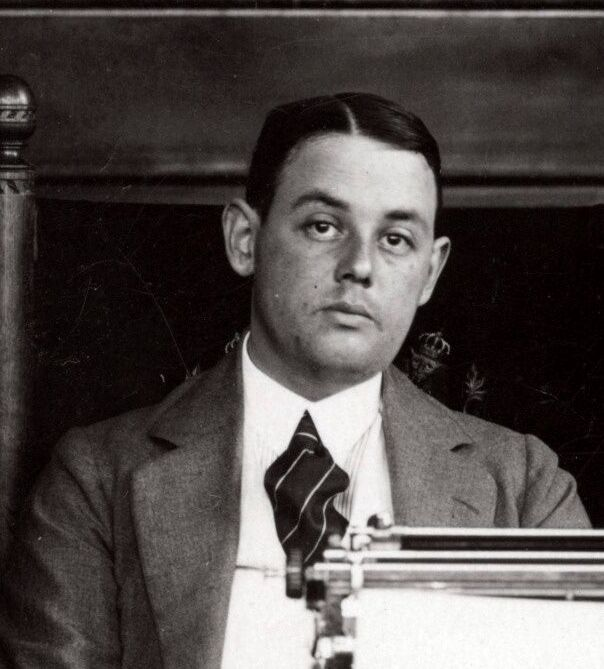
Herman Salomonson in 1922

Herman Salomonson, also known as Melis Stoke, (March 24, 1892, in Amsterdam – October 7, 1942, in Mauthausen concentration camp) was a Dutch journalist, writer, and poet of Jewish heritage. In 1940 he was arrested by the German occupiers of the Netherlands and murdered in 1942.

== Biography ==
Herman Salomonson was born in 1892 as the son of Dinah Wertheim, daughter of an Amsterdam banker, and Maurits Salomonson, child of a Jewish merchant family. He grew up in a wealthy, liberal environment. He initially studied at the Technical University in Delft. After the outbreak of the First World War, he broke off his studies and moved to Belgium, from where he reported on the war events for an Amsterdam newspaper.

In 1915, Salomonson returned to the Netherlands and became editor of the weekly newspaper De Groene Amsterdammer. He gained notoriety through humorous “rhyming chronicles” of daily news and wrote his first novel. He published often under the pseudonym Melis Stoke, referring to the 13th-century Dutch chronicler Melis Stoke, who also wrote in rhyme. In 1916/17 he completed his compulsory military service and was trained as a reserve officer. In 1922 he married Josine Annette Maas Geesteranus (1896–1992) also known as J. A. Maas Geesteranus or "Annie". The couple had two children: son Herman Arnold Nicolaas “Hans” (1922–1945) and daughter Nannette “Netje” (born 1925).

From 1923 to 1927, he was editor-in-chief of the well-known daily newspaper Java-Bode in Batavia, the capital of the Dutch East Indies. He brought the renowned but struggling newspaper back on the road to success. His experiences in the colony had a lasting influence on his work. Of the “Indian” novels that he published, Zoutwaterliefde (Salt Water Love, 1929) is best known. His magazine columns also often had an “Indian” focus.

From 1927, Salomonson and his family lived in The Hague. He directed the local branch of the Dutch-Indian press office Aneta (Algemeen Nieuws-en Telegraaf-Agentschap). He converted to Christianity.

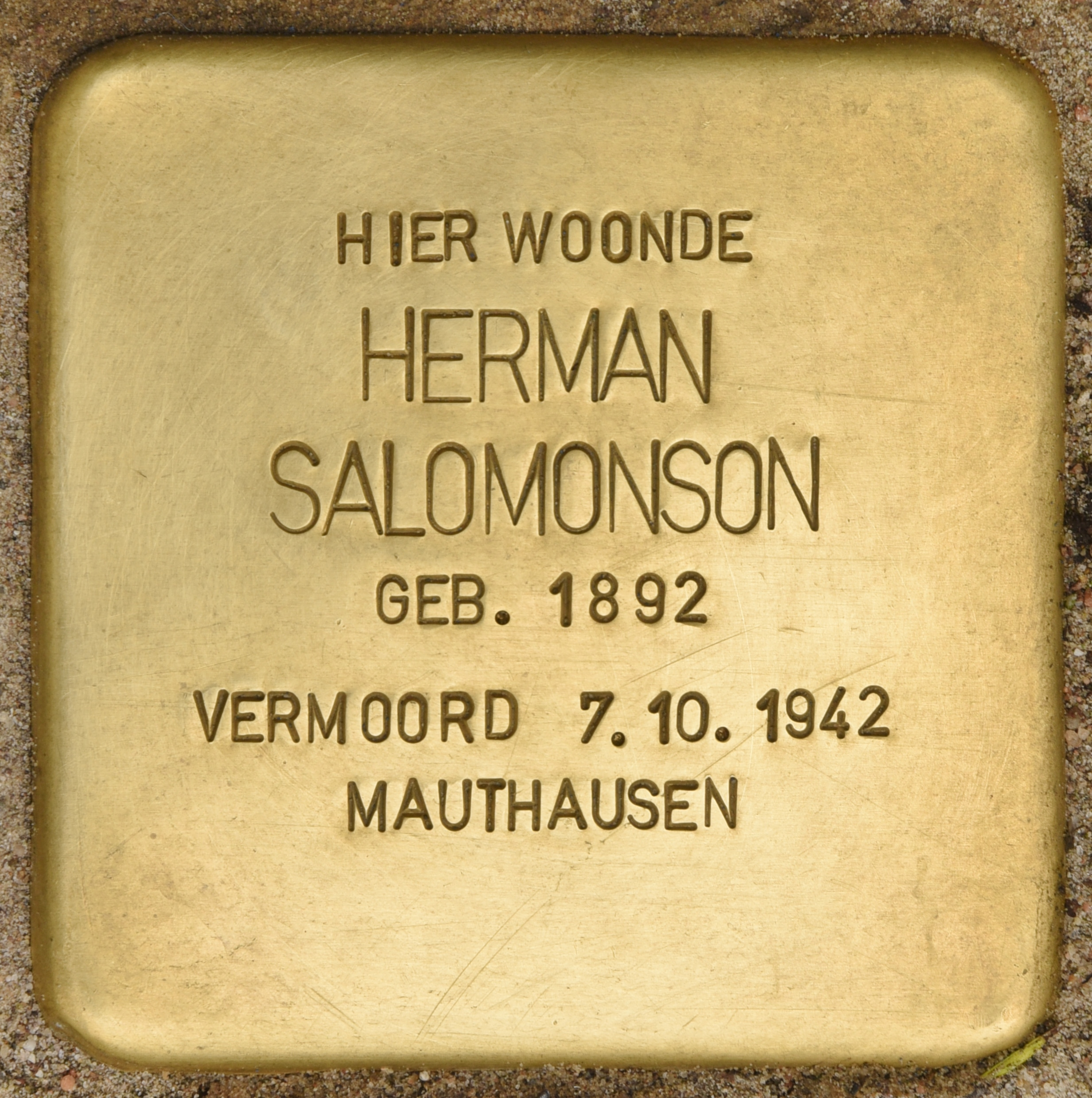
Commemorative stolperstein for Herman Salomonson in Den Haag, Laan Copes van Cattenburch 129

== Nazi era ==
When the Netherlands mobilized on September 1, 1939, at the beginning of the Second World War, Salomonson was called up a “reserve captain for special services” in the Vrijwillig Landstormkorps Luchtafweerdienst (Voluntary Army Air Defense Corps). Before the German occupation in May 1940, he broadcast the news on the radio about German aircraft invading Dutch airspace. He also produced together with reserve officer L.C. Reedijk made a short documentary about Dutch air defense under his name; Melis Stoke wrote the script. In February 1940, the film, Luchtgevaar!, published, the employees were the same. The film premiered at the Hotel Krasnapolsky and the two makers were honored by Prince Bernhard.

Salomonson remained on the air until May 10, 1940, the day of the German occupation. In his history of the Netherlands during WWII (Het Koninkrijk der Nederlanden in de Tweede Wereldoorlog) Loe de Jong wrote that on May 15, 1940, the cultural attaché of the German embassy Heinrich Hushahn, refused access to Salomonson to the building of the Algemeen Nederlands Persbureau (ANP). Hushahn had previously personally fired all Jewish employees of the ANP. Herman Salomonson subsequently illegally distributed poems he had written .

On October 26, 1940, the Gestapo seized Herman Salomonson from his apartment at Laan Copes van Cattenburch 129 in The Hague. His work for the Dutch air defense was viewed as “anti-German,” and he was considered a Jew by the Germans despite his conversion. During his imprisonment as a “protective prisoner” in the Oranjehotel in Scheveningen, he was violently brutalized. He wrote poems for his fellow prisoners, which were published in 1946 under the title Recruit School. After the war, survivors testified to “his astonishing selflessness.” Salomonson believed in the “power of love to conquer evil.” On April 12, 1942, he was deported from the Amersfoort transit camp to Buchenwald, then to the Nazi concentration camp of Mauthausen, in Austria, where he was murdered on October 7, 1942. The death notice reads “shot while trying to escape“.

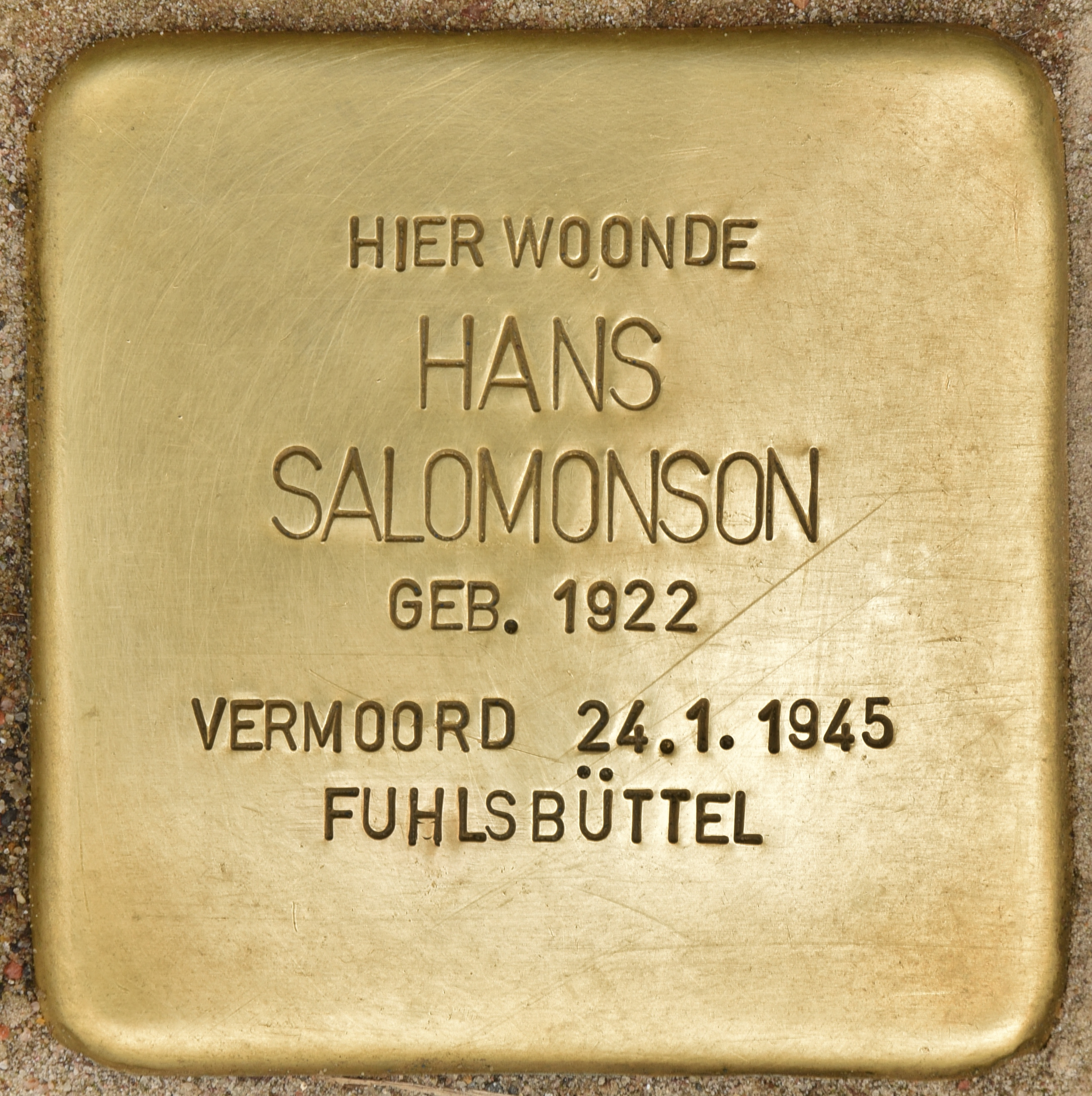
Stolperstein for Salomonson's son Hans, also in front of the house at Laan Copes van Cattenburch 129 in The Hague

For Herman Salomonson and his son Hans – a resistance fighter who was murdered in the Fuhlsbüttel concentration camp in January 1945 – commemorative stumbling blocks were laid on March 9, 2019, in front of their former home in The Hague, 129 Laan Copes van Cattenburch. Hans Salomonson's grave is located on the Dutch Ehrenfeld Hamburg. Herman Salomonson's wife Annie and daughter survived the war. Nannette Salomonson married the Dutch painter Edgar Fernhout (1912–1974) in 1947.

== Art collection ==
His wife Annie (J. A. Maas Geesteranus) owned the painting by Vincent van Gogh, The Old Tower, currently in the Emil Bührle Collection.

== Selected works ==
- De collage van Ferdinand Volnay (1916)
- Van aardappelmes tot officiersdegen. Uit het dagboek van een landstormplichtige (1917).
- Bomston (1920).
- Een man van geld. Avonturen-roman van eenvoudige lui (1930).
- Er waren eens twee koningskinderen. Een vroolijke filmfantasie (1932).
- De Reis zonder einde (1937).
- Hoogwaardigen. De geschiedenis eener ideale echtverbintenis (1937).
- Rieman en Co. (1938).
- De man die het Britsch Museum cadeau kreeg. Een fantastische roman (1939, Science-Fiction, die im Jahr 2000 spielt).
- Recrutenschool en andere gevangenisverzen van Herman Salomonson (Melis Stoke).
- Melis Stoke (Pseudonym von Herman Salomonson): Zoutwaterliefde. Kroniek van een reis per mailboot (2006). Nachdruck mit ausführlicher Biographie.

== Literature ==
- Gerard Termorshuizen: Een humaan koloniaal. Leven en werk van Herman Salomonson alias Melis Stoke. Nijgh & Van Ditmar, 2015, ISBN 978-90-388-0071-4
