= Arleux-en-Gohelle =

- Commune
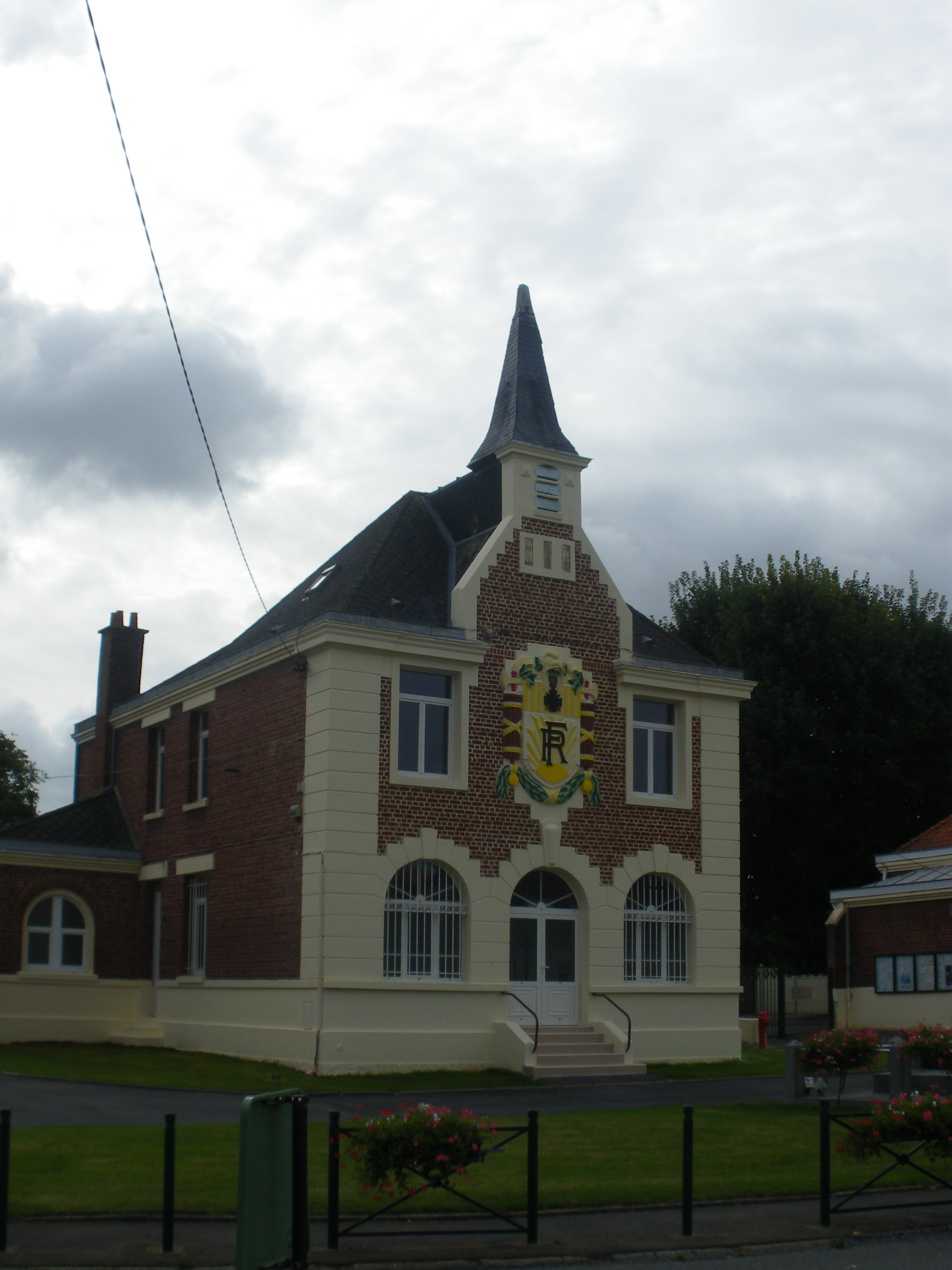
- The town hall of Arleux-en-Gohelle

- Coat of arms
- Location of Arleux-en-Gohelle
- Location within France Location within Hauts-de-France
- Coordinates: 50°21′49″N 2°52′19″E
- Country: France
- Region: Hauts-de-France
- Department: Pas-de-Calais
- Arrondissement: Arras
- Canton: Brebières
- Intercommunality: CC Osartis Marquion

Government
  - Mayor (2020–2026): Norbert Grobelny
- Area^{1}: 6.27 km^{2} (2.42 sq mi)
- Elevation: 69 m (226 ft)
- Highest elevation: 75 m (246 ft)
- Lowest elevation: 50 m (160 ft)
- Population (2023): 960
  - Density: 150/km^{2} (400/sq mi)
- Time zone: UTC+01:00 (CET)
  - Summer (DST): UTC+02:00 (CEST)
- INSEE/Postal code: 62039 /62580
- ^{1} French Land Register data, which excludes lakes, ponds, glaciers > 1 km^{2} (0.386 sq mi or 247 acres) and river estuaries.

Arleux-en-Gohelle (French pronunciation: [aʁlø ɑ̃ ɡɔɛl], lit. 'Arleux in Gohelle') is a commune in the Pas-de-Calais department in northern France.

== Geography ==
A village located 7 miles (12 km) north-east of Arras at the junction of the N919 and D50 roads.

== History ==
The commune name first appears in 1119 as Haluth. The village was all but destroyed during World War I.

== Population ==
Historical population
Year	Pop.	±% p.a.
1968	575	—
1975	557	−0.45%
1982	509	−1.28%
1990	675	+3.59%
1999	709	+0.55%
2007	824	+1.90%
2012	826	+0.05%
2017	856	+0.72%
2023	960	+1.93%
Source: INSEE

== Sights ==
- The church of St. Martin, dating from the twentieth century.
- The World War I cemetery.

== See also ==
- Communes of the Pas-de-Calais department
