= 86th Infantry Division (German Empire) =

86th Infantry Division (86. Infanterie-Division)
- Active: 1914-1919
- Country: German Empire
- Branch: Army
- Type: Infantry
- Size: Approx. 12,500
- Engagements: World War I: Gorlice-Tarnów Offensive, Second Battle of the Marne

The 86th Infantry Division (86. Infanterie-Division) was a formation of the Imperial German Army in World War I. The division was formed in November 1914 as the Wernitz Division (Division Wernitz), named after its commander General Theodor von Wernitz, and became the 86th Infantry Division in August 1915. The division was disbanded in 1919 during the demobilization of the German Army after World War I.

== Combat chronicle ==
The 86th Infantry Division initially served on the Eastern Front. It occupied the line by Mława from November 1914 to July 1915 and then participated in the Gorlice-Tarnów Offensive, breaking through at Przasnysz and fighting on the Narew, and then participating in follow-on fighting for the next several months until the line stabilized. In September 1915, under General Theodor von Wernitz (1848–1922), it was in the Lithuanian swamps. It was engaged in positional warfare in the Vishnev sector on the Berezina, Olshanka and Krevljanka Rivers from September 1915 to March 1916. It then fought at Lake Narač. It was along the Upper Styr and Stokhod Rivers from July 1916 to December 1917. In January 1918, after the armistice on the Eastern Front, the division was transported to the Western Front. It was in the line in various parts of the front, and fought in the Allied counterattack phase of the Second Battle of the Marne. It remained in the line until the end of the war. Allied intelligence rated the division as fourth class.

== Order of battle on formation ==
The 86th Infantry Division was formed as a square division. The order of battle of the division on 7 July 1915 was as follows:

- 171. Infanterie-Brigade
  - Infanterie-Regiment Nr. 341
  - Infanterie-Regiment Nr. 342
- 172. Infanterie-Brigade
  - Infanterie-Regiment Nr. 343
  - Infanterie-Regiment Nr. 344
- Reiter-Regiment Cleinow (Kavallerie-Regiment Nr. 86)
- Feldartillerie-Regiment Nr. 86
- I.Bataillon/2. Westpreußisches Fußartillerie-Regiment Nr. 17
- 3. Ersatz-Kompanie/Pionier-Bataillon Nr. 26
- 1. Landwehr-Pionier-Kompanie/XVII. Armeekorps

== Late-war order of battle ==
The division underwent a number of organizational changes over the course of the war. It was triangularized in 1916, losing the 171st Infantry Brigade headquarters and the 342nd Infantry Regiment. Cavalry was reduced, artillery and signals commands were formed, and combat engineer support was expanded to a full pioneer battalion. The order of battle on 3 February 1918 was as follows:

- 172. Infanterie-Brigade
  - Infanterie-Regiment Nr. 341
  - Infanterie-Regiment Nr. 343
  - Infanterie-Regiment Nr. 344
  - Radfahrer-Kompanie Nr. 86
- Artillerie-Kommandeur 65
  - Feldartillerie-Regiment Nr. 86
  - Fußartillerie-Bataillon Nr. 404 (from 18 July 1918)
- Stab Pionier-Bataillon Nr. 86
  - 3. Ersatz-Kompanie/Pionier-Bataillon Nr. 26
  - 3. Reserve-Kompanie/Pionier-Bataillon Nr. 34
  - Minenwerfer-Kompanie Nr. 86
- Divisions-Nachrichten-Kommandeur 86
