= Aneta (news agency) =

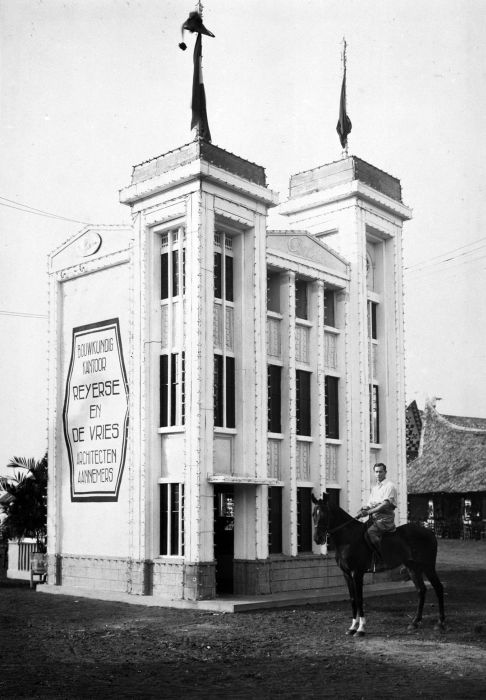
Replica of the Aneta press office at Gambir Market, c. 1923

Aneta (Dutch: Algemeen Nieuws- en Telegraaf-Agentschap, "General News and Telegraph Agency") was a Dutch news agency founded 1 April 1917 by Dominique Willem Berretty. It was the first news agency in the Dutch East Indies (now Indonesia), and a predecessor of the Antara news agency.

In 1920, Aneta moved to a new building located on what is now Jalan Antara in Jakarta. The facade of the building was remodeled into a more striking building with a clock tower in 1930. The building still stands but is in poor condition.

By 1941 Aneta had become the semi-official news agency of the East Indies government. The agency's operations were restricted under Japanese occupation, and it eventually closed by 1946. Aneta changed its name to Persbiro Indonesia (Indonesian Press Bureau) in 1954 and was later merged into the rival Antara news agency in 1963.
