= 1934 KLM Douglas DC-2 crash =

Airplane crash

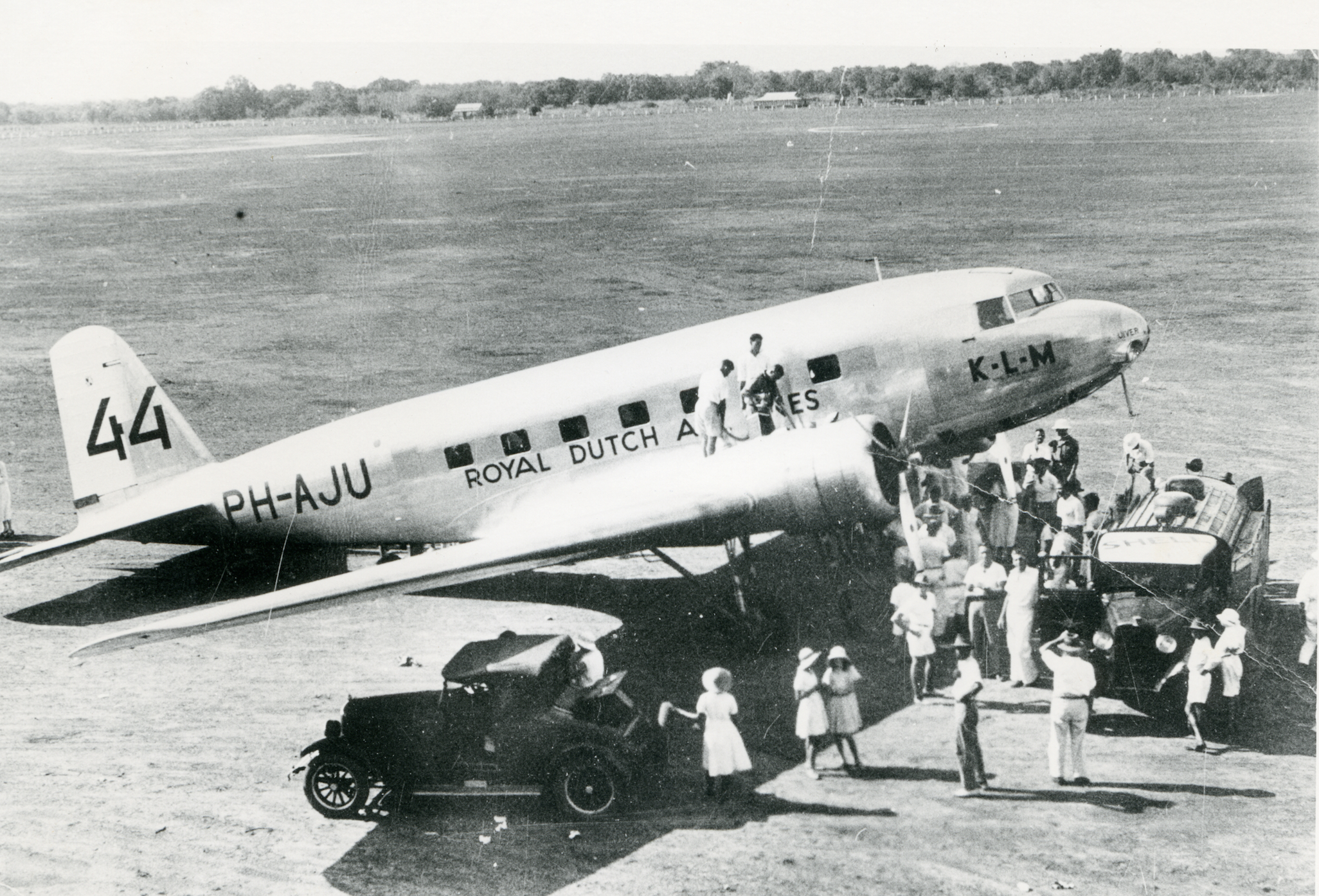
- PH-AJU, the aircraft involved in the accident.

Accident
- Date: 20 December 1934
- Summary: Bad weather.
- Site: 16 kilometres south of Rutbah Wells at a British desert fortress

Aircraft
- Aircraft type: Douglas DC-2
- Operator: KLM
- Registration: PH-AJU
- Flight origin: Schiphol Airport, the Netherlands
- Destination: Batavia, Dutch East Indies
- Passengers: 3
- Crew: 4
- Fatalities: 7
- Survivors: 0

On 19 December 1934, KLM Royal Dutch Airlines operated Douglas DC-2-115A Uiver (registration PH-AJU) was an extra scheduled international Christmas mail-and-passenger flight from Schiphol Airport in Amsterdam, the Netherlands, to Batavia in the Netherlands East Indies with eight intermediate stops.

During the flight from Almaza Airport outside Cairo, Egypt, to Baghdad, Iraq, the airplane crashed near Rutbah Wells, Iraq, during a rainstorm and burst into flames, killing all seven people on board.

After investigations only a technical report was made public that stated that the crash occurred due to the bad weather and bad flight characteristics of the airplane. The report about the responsibility was not made public at the time but was obtained by newspaper Het Vrije Volk about fifty years later. It stated that the KLM was responsible for the crash. The KLM had taken too many risks while undertaking this flight and had ignored multiple important safety aspects of the aircraft. Minister of Infrastructure and Water Management Jacob Kalff was also blamed, for giving out a certificate of airworthiness for the aircraft with fewer demands than desired. Given the unmade adjustments to the aircraft and known dangers, it was also deemed irresponsible by the report to have allowed passengers on this flight.

== Background ==
The airplane became internationally known after winning the handicap classification in the MacRobertson Air Race, where it was the only commercial passenger airliner that participated. The race had a long day-to-day coverage in the Netherlands and the achievement became immensely popular, including the production of merchandise of the aircraft and the crew. This achievement is still regarded as the most important historic event in Dutch aviation.

From the first years of KLM it was regarded as an aviation company with the highest safety rules, strict safety policies, and careful selection of its pilots. Due to the popularity of the KLM and the impact it had internationally, it was at the time not considered appropriate to publish criticism of the company, its operations or its pilots.

== Uiver airplane ==
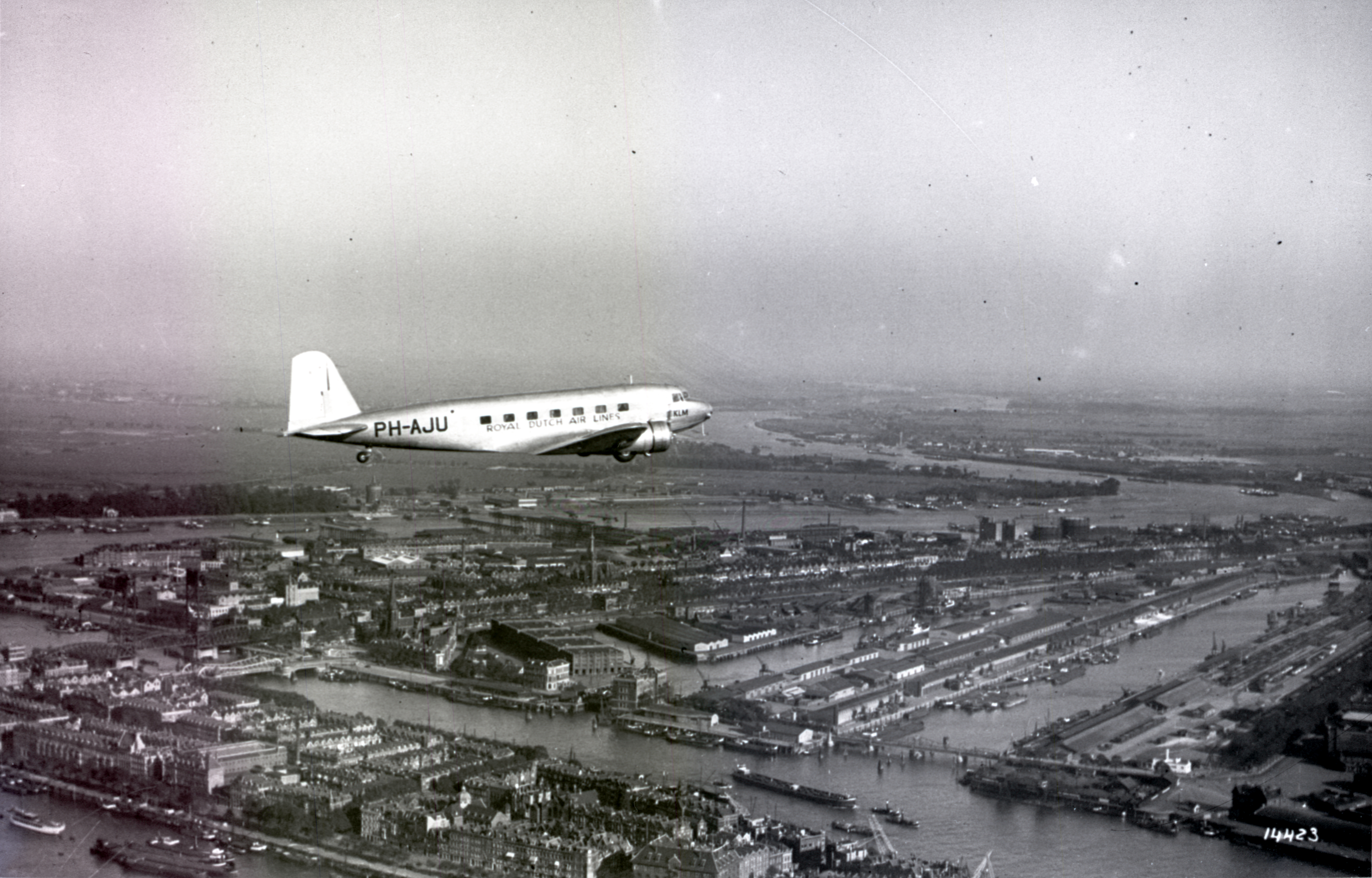
The Uiver while flying above the Netherlands

The Uiver was an American built Douglas DC-2. It was the 18th DC-2 built and it preceded two more orders of (14 and 3 respectively) DC-2 airplanes for KLM. It had construction number 1317 and was registered as PH-AJU. At the time, KLM named their aircraft after a bird with a name starting with the last letter of the registration. This aircraft received the name of “Uiver” (a local name for the stork). The aircraft was delivered on 21 August 1934 after arriving in the Netherlands on 12 September 1934 by ship (s.s. "Statendam"). This Douglas DC-2 had 2 Wright Cyclone SGR 1820-F2 piston engines of 750 hp each. The aircraft had a cruising speed of 290 km/h, a maximum take-off weight of 8.4 tons and a flight range of 1750 km.

== Flight ==
The flight was an extra mail flight to Batavia. After the success of winning the Melbourne race and the popularity of the “Uiver” airplane; the KLM had launched a publicity stunt “Your Christmas and New Year's wishes with the Uiver to the East — you will receive an answer within 11 days“. Tens of thousands of letters and cards were received.

On 19 December 1934 the KLM Royal Dutch Airlines operated Douglas DC-2-115A Uiver (registration PH-AJU) was an extra scheduled international Christmas mail-and-passenger flight from Schiphol Airport in Amsterdam, the Netherlands, to Batavia in the Netherlands East Indies which intermediate stops at Marseille, France; Rome, Italy; Athens and Cairo, Greece and Baghdad, Iraq, Karachi in Pakistan Yangon in Myanmar and Singapore. The intention was that the flight would be flown in a record time, so faster than the December 1933 Christmas flight with the Fokker F.XVIII “Pelikaan”. On board were four crew members, three passengers and 350 kg of mail. After the fourth intermediate stop, the airplane departed at 9.50 pm from Cairo for the route to Baghdad, Iraq. Shortly after midnight, at 00.10 a.m. radio operator Van Zadelhoff asked the RAF base in Rutbah Wells for the position of the airplane. Half an hour later the plane is last heard by the people working at the pumping station H.3 of the Kirkuk–Haifa oil pipeline. It was at the moment very bad weather, this forecast was unknown when the airplane left Cairo.

== Search operation ==
The location where the plane crashed was unknown. The area where the aircraft could be was in the desert in an area which was “bigger than Germany”.

Due to the bad weather and unavailable airports the search operation for the aircraft was not possible at the day of the crash.

A large search started on 21 December. Twenty-four airplanes of the British Royal Air Force from Baghdad; airplanes of the Iraq Air Force from Amman and also one airplane of the Iraq Petroleum Company were involved in the search. From the Netherlands the “Leeuwerik” airplane went to Iraq to search for the aircraft in case it still was not found by the time it arrived. The Royal Air Force searched in the triangle Ramadi-Haditha-Rutbah, the Iraq Air Force searched between Amman and Rutbah. On 21 December a Royal Air Force pilot of squadron no.14 discovered the burned-out wreck, at 6:30 GWT, 16 kilometres south of Rutbah Wells at a British desert fortress. Nobody had survived the crash and all the seven bodies were found. The bodies were flown to Baghdad by the RAF.

== Mail recovery ==
Of the transported Mail, 142 kg of the 350 kg was burned after the explosion of the crash. Part of the rescued mail was undamaged, but the rest showed visible signs of the accident. This mail was picked up by Viruly with the PH-AIR "Rijstvogel" and transported to Batavia, where it arrived on 28 December 1934. An American Philip W. Ireland (Philip Willard Ireland) was illegally trying to sell mail that was onboard the aircraft. At the request of the police in The Hague, he was arrested in London and 36 mail pieces were found. The mail was given back to the right holders in February 1935. Philip did a doctorate at the London School of Economics in London and went to Baghdad to write a book on how Iraq was created titled “Iraq: A Study in Political Development” and published in 1938.

In total 349 of the 5225 items could be delivered in the Dutch East Indies by the post office headquarter in Bandung. The remaining 7.2 kg of mail was sent back to the Netherlands by boat in April 1935. After requesting, 181 other mail items that were still in Iraq were sent to the Netherlands.

== Casualties ==
=== Crew members ===
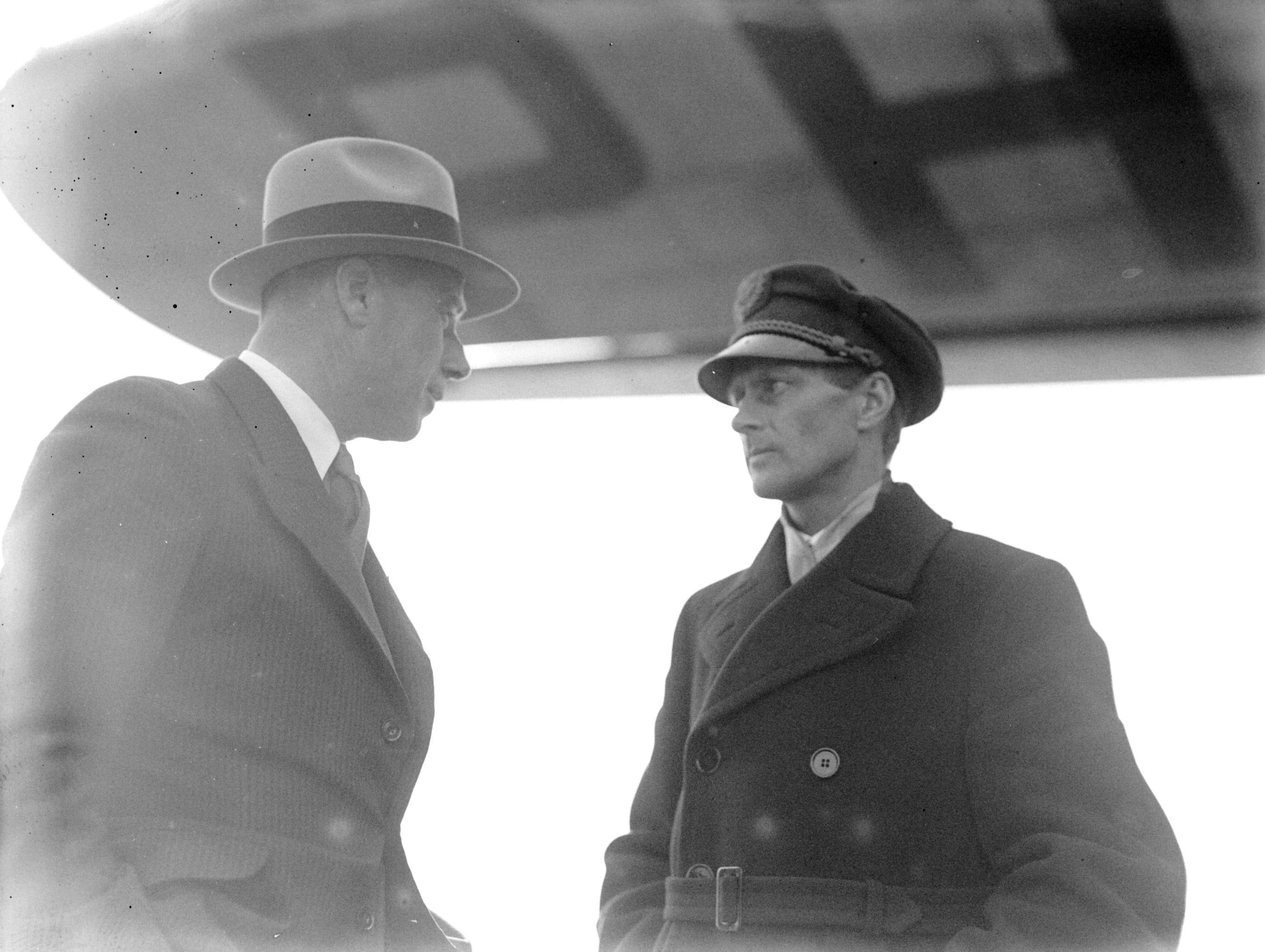
Beekman (right) in October 1934

- Wim Beekman (born 15 March 1895 in Brouwershaven) was the captain of the flight. After being in the army he went to the aviation department, where he earned his pilot's license on 8 December 1922. He worked since 14 May 1924 with the KLM. Beekman was a very experienced pilot and one of the oldest at KLM. He had done the flight between Amsterdam and Batavia as captain many times. He had 40 flight hours in the “Uiver”. He was married and had one daughter Inge Beekman. His daughter became an actress and had worked as a KLM flight attendant.
- Jan Johannes van Steenbergen (born 15 April 1898 in Leiden) was the second pilot of the flight. Working at the aviation department, he earned his pilot's license on 23 October 1925. He left service and started working since 16 April 1928 with the KLM; not as a pilot but as flight engineer because no pilots were needed at the time. After various positions he became KLM pilot on 1 October 1931 pilot. He had done the flight between Amsterdam and Batavia twelve times and was captain on European flights for quite some time. He had a total of 3200 flight hours. He was married and didn't have children.
- Hendrik Abraham Waalewijn (born 12 February 1900 in Rotterdam) was the flight engineer. Waalewijn worked since 4 April 1921 with the KLM and was chief engineer at Schiphol Airport. Since 1929, he was regularly a crew member on the flight to the Dutch East Indies to experience and learn from the developments on this route. This was the sixth time he flew to Batavia. He was married and had two children.
- Gysbert van Zadelhoff (born 13 May 1908 in Baarn) was the telegraphist. Van Zadelhoff worked at Radio Holland and worked as a telegraphist at several ships. He worked since 1 August 1931 with the KLM and was one of the oldest telegraphist and was named a very experienced telegraphist. He had made ten return flights to the Dutch East Indies. Three years earlier, in 1931, he was the sole survivor of the flight crash of the “Ooievaar” in Bangkok. He was married.

=== Passengers ===
- Dominique Willem Berretty (born 20 November 1890 in Jogjakarta, Dutch East Indies) was founder and director of the Indian news agency Aneta in Batavia. According to reliable sources, he had been in contact in December 1934 in the Netherlands with Gerhard Fritze the German director of Lippmann, Rosenthal & Co., a bank seized and used by Nazis. Berretty was willing to sell his news agency to the Nazi's, but this deal fell through.
- Prof. Eduard Willem Walch, usually written as E.W. Walch (born 9 August 1890 in Schiedam) was a Dutch professor of health science in the Dutch East Indies with expertise in hygiene and malaria control. He started his career in Amsterdam doing research into bacteriology and hygiene. After doing research at the east coast of Sumatra. He had conducted research for the Rockefeller Foundation on, among other things, the fight against malaria. Afterwards he became head of malaria control and later chief of Medical laboratory. He became professor of bacteriology and hygiene at the G.H.S. He was a member of the Hygienic Institute of the people's association in Singapore and was appointed in Nanking as the permanent secretary. He went to the Netherlands on 5 December due to illness of his mother.
- Jacobus Thijmen Kort (born 21 August 1886 in Leiden) was a successful businessman. He owned the roof tile factory “Karangpilang” in Surabaya, the Dutch East Indies as was commissioner of newspaper Soerabaijasch Handelsblad. He later founded the "Indische Buurt" in Oegstgeest, the Netherlands. He was married and had 2 children.

== Reactions ==
The accident brought great dejection in the Netherlands. At the time when there was still a lot of uncertainty about the crash, the Dutch Queen Wilhelmina of the Netherlands requested information from the KLM office. After it was announced that nobody survived, Queen Wilhelmina and princess sent both telegrams expressing their condoleances. After it was announced that the plane had been found without survivors people came en masse to the KLM office to express their condolences, including minister Kalff. Also the following days people went to the office of the KLM including officials of the International Air Transport Association, Rijksluchtvaartdienst, Koninklijke Nederlandse Vereniging voor Luchtvaart. Due to the large number of people, police assistance was needed.

At the Tweede Kamer the accident was commemorated with a speeches chairman Charles Ruijs de Beerenbrouck, and minister Kalff on behalf of the government.

As a tribute, radio programming (NCRV, VARA) had been stopped for at least one day. Flags were flown at half-mast in the Netherlands.

Condolences were received from all international airlines.

Also many people in the Dutch East Indies expressed their condolences, including Governor-general of the Dutch East Indies Bonifacius Cornelis de Jonge and the vice president of the Council of the Indies Jan Willem Meijer Ranneft. Transocean and Reuters specially expressed their condolences to Berretty and Walch.

News agency Aneta received condolences from Germany, England, the United States, China and the Netherlands and from many foreign news agencies. It received also condolences from vice-president Council of the Indies Jan Willem Meyer Ranneft. Many people went to the office of Aneta, including mr. Peekela, governor in the Dutch East Indies C.A. Schnitzler. Furthermore, condolences were received from the secretary of the finance department Verhoeff, Van der Most of the main prosecutor's office and the resident of Batavia. Furthermore, of almost all newspapers of the Dutch East Indies newspapers, Koninklijke Paketvaart-Maatschappij management, Van Cuijk of the Nederlandsch-Indische Escompto Maatschappij and head of the PTT Van Ophuysen. Next to those, many other officials from who condolences were received were published.

Due to the death of Professor Eduard Willem Walch, the farewell speech of Cornelis de Langen who worked at the same university was cancelled. Rector Magnificus Prof. Willem Alphonse Mijsberg spoke about Walch and his works.

== Funerals ==
At first, all victims were buried at the English cemetery in Baghdad on 23 December 1934. They were however exhumed again, with the exception of Beretty, on 22 January 1936. With the "Drachenfels" they were transported to the Netherlands. The funerals in the Netherlands took place on 1 April 1936. Beekman was reburied at the cemetery in Muiderberg. The other crew members were reburied in a communal grave at the Zorgvlied cemetery in Amsterdam, as often happened after deadly KLM flying accidents. Professor Walch's remains were buried at the General Cemetery in Haarlem.

== Theories ==
Variants of a theory that the crash occurred due to Berretty were told in Anatolia, the Dutch East Indies and the Netherlands.

=== Berretty ===
It is said that Dominique Willem Berretty was a Japanese spy. Berretty owned a magazine with a huge circulation where he wrote slander himself. That Berretty was in Japanese service could be argued from the fact he always paid slander fines in the Dutch East Indies in Japanese yen. Berretty's owned Villa Isola was said to be funded by the Japanese secret service. It was said that the tennis court was so firmly founded that there could be stationed a field artillery battery. As Berretty tried to do business with the Germans, it remains unknown if Berrretty worked with the Japanese; with the Germans; with both or with neither. According to newspaper Het Vrije Volk it was “most likely” he worked as a double spy for the political intelligence service in Batavia.

=== Reuters press stories ===
Journalist and poet Jan H. de Groot was working as a government telegrapher at the time of the crash. He forwarded the Reuters journalists' stories from the crash location to England. These long press releases contained other information than the official readings. At Schiphol, D. W. Berretty was the last passenger who boarded the airplane, after he arrived by plane from London. According to the Reuter story he made a nervous and hurried impression. He would have told pilot Beekman he was a Japanese spy, who was chased by the English police, because he had top secret documents with him. Berretty would have offered Beekman f. 50.000 and later f. 100.000 if he would an emergency landing in the desert instead of landing in Baghdad; at the time British property where Berretty would be arrested. In Cairo, pilot Beekman would have called KLM director Plesman to discuss the situation. Plesman would have ordered Beekman to continue as planned. While flying over the desert, Berretty would have shot and shortly after the airplane crashed. According to Reuters, there were bullet-shaped holes in the wing; which were attributed to lightning in the official report.

Due to his confidentiality obligation, he could not talk about it at the time, and only told his story as late as January 1984. When asked by Reuters, they said that telegrams from the 1930s were destroyed within five years. Reuters said apart from that, that unverified stories were never forwarded to newspapers.

Frans van Reijsen was Head of the Rijksluchtvaartdienst in 1984. His predecessor had told him that Berretty would be arrested in Baghdad. He had heard from people from Indonesia that Barretty would be a Japanese spy. He stated that no gunshot wounds were found during the autopsy. According to Van Reijsen it's unlikely there was a shooting because if there had been a shooting, that would have been favored by Plesman as the reason for the crash.

== Investigations and cover-up ==
Multiple investigative committees, including of the KLM and the Dutch Ministry of Transport travelled to the crash site for investigation. The disaster was investigated by Dr. Hendricus van der Maas, head of the Aircraft department of the RSL (Rijks Studiedienst voor de Luchtvaart, 1919–1937). He arrived at the scene of the accident on 26 December. On 8 January he made his first report to the Luchtvaartdienst (LVD). Subsequent written reports were not published. The “Permanente Ongevallen Commissie” (POC) of the RSL was adjusted on 7 February 1935 and came under the leadership of Vice Admiral jhr. George Lodewijk Schorer.

The first published findings were that the airplane plane crashed at full speed with its landing gear retracted and with running engines. The plane crashed a direction opposite to the scheduled flight direction. This suggests that the aircraft made a 180 degree turn due to the heavy weather and ended up in a so-called "spinning flight"; a situation that had previously occurred with this type of aircraft. Partly considering the position of the instruments of the airplane, the first conclusion was that lightning must have been the cause of the disaster, but this was later retracted.

Beekman initially refused to start the flight. He did not trust the plane and was tired. During an earlier test flight to Cairo, he encountered heavy weather on the way back over the Ardennes. The airplane was controlled only with great difficulty by the two experienced pilots: Beekman and Sillevis. The flying characteristics of the DC-2 had previously given rise to research, including into the functioning of the rudder. Eventually Beekman started the flight against his will. Beekman is said to have been under great pressure to complete the flight in record time.

The DC-2 aircraft was not popular among the Dutch pilots. Fourteen new DC-2 airplanes had recently been ordered, which Plesman did not want to cancel.

It is remarkable that 10 hours before the plane crashed, strangers inquired whether the plane had already crashed.

=== Technical report (Schroder) ===
In April 1935, a special committee, led by vice admiral jhr. George Lodewijk Schorer, made public the technical report. The conclusion was that a multiple factors caused the crash. The bad weather, Beekman's fatigue and the poor flying characteristics of the aircraft all contributed to the crash. No further details were given.

=== Responsibility report (Schroder) ===
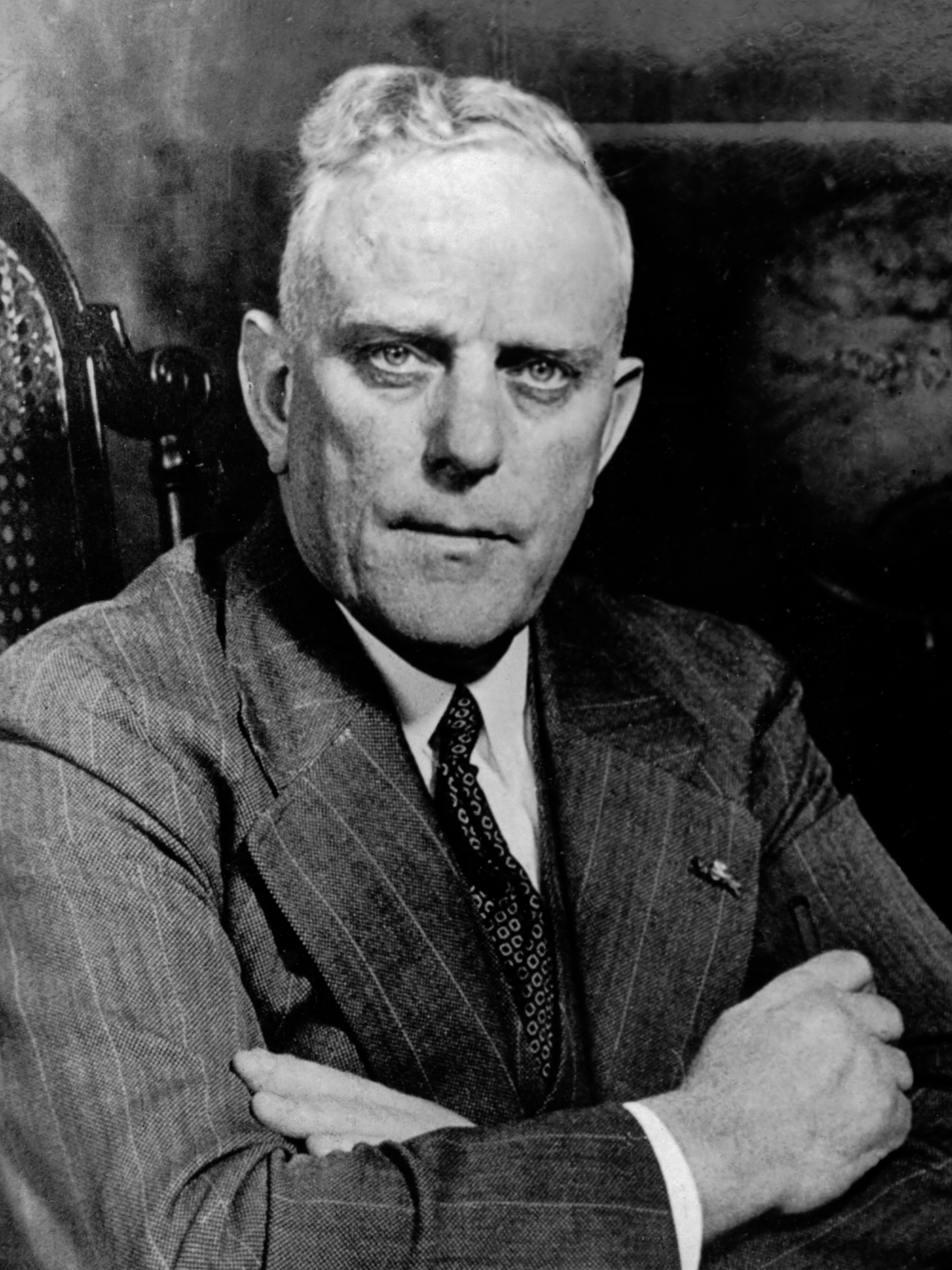
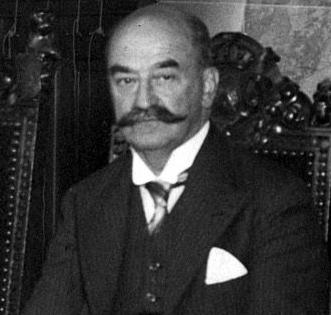
The cover-up responsibility report states that KLM management under Albert Plesman (left) and minister Jacob Kalff (right) were responsible for the crash.

Next to the technical report, The Schorer committee also produced a report about the responsibility for the accident, but this report was not made public. Almost fifty years after the crash, in January 1984, Dutch newspaper Het Vrije Volk obtained a copy of the report and published it. The report stated that KLM under Albert Plesman and minister Jacob Kalff were to be blamed. Given the unmade adjustements and the known dangers, KLM took too many risks in undertaking this flight and it was irresponsible to allow passengers on it.

According to this report the pilot could not be held responsible for the accident. While he was in Cairo “tired and even a bit dazed“ with doubts if he was “mentally fit enough for the difficult flight”; he couldn't be blamed he was ordered by KLM to make a quick forced flight or would otherwise be fired. The difficult controllability of the aircraft in heavy weather was known by the KLM management. While Beekman was an experienced pilot, he had twice lost control of the aircraft in an earlier flight from Cairo in heavy weather. According to the report, it was expected that such conditions were also to be expected on this flight. The multiple desired adjustments to the aircraft were not made by the KLM due to “time constraints”. Second pilot Van Steenbergen had only made 10 flight hours in this aircraft, according to American regulations, this is insufficient for such a flight. Due to the shortcomings in the preparation and the risks taken, for a flight that had to be completed in record time, it was according to the report, irresponsible to allow passengers on this flight.

After the crash, the committee concluded the KLM had destroyed multiple important documents, including Beekman's report on the flight characteristics of the aircraft and the report of the meeting about it; where Beekman's cupboard was first broken open.

Next to the KLM the Minister of Infrastructure and Water Management Jacob Kalff is blamed. He had given out a certificate of airworthiness for the aircraft with fewer demands than desired due to the “major interests of KLM” and should not have issued a passenger permit. The six demands requested by the minister in return for giving out the certificate were not implemented by KLM.

== Legacy ==
Reference to this crash is made in multiple historical overviews of KLM.
