= George Lodewijk Schorer =

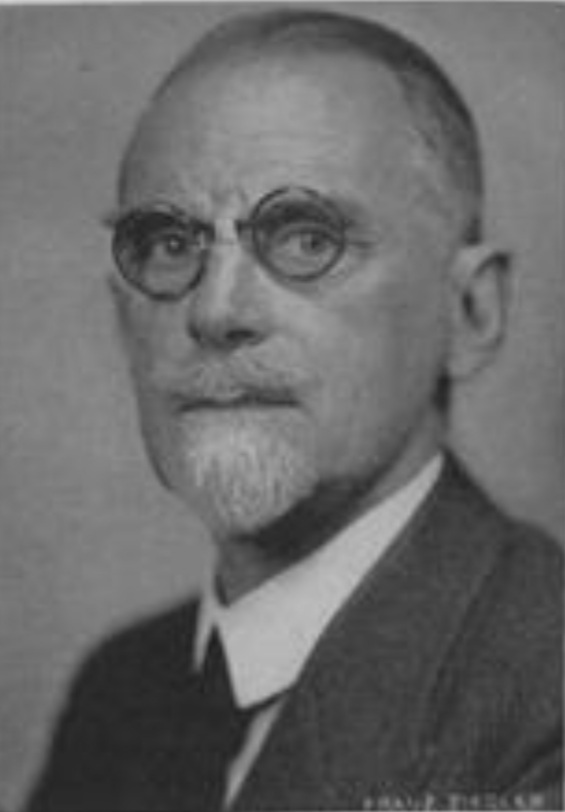
- Schorer (1930s)
- Born: 19 August 1876; Amsterdam, Netherlands
- Died: 4 June 1955 (aged 78) The Hague, Netherlands
- Allegiance: Netherlands
- Branch: Royal Netherlands Navy
- Service years: 1895–1933
- Rank: Vice admiral
- Commands: HNLMS Sumatra
- Conflicts: World War I
- Awards: Knight of the Order of the Netherlands Lion; Commander of the Order of Orange-Nassau
- Other work: Member of the Netherlands Aviation Safety Board, Head of Schorer Commission (Uiver crash investigation)

George Lodewijk Schorer (19 August 1876 – 4 June 1955) was a Dutch officer of the Royal Netherlands Navy who later became a member of the Netherlands Aviation Safety Board.

Schorer was a member of the noble Schorer family and the son of Jonkheer Mr. George Lodewijk Schorer, president of the district court in Haarlem, and Maria Jacoba van der Lek de Clercq.

== World War I ==
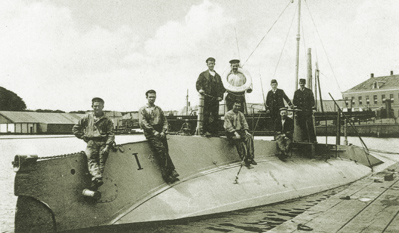
HNLMS O 1, the Dutch first submarine

Leading up to World War I, Schorer served as a major 3rd class in 1895 and later became an electrical engineer in 1903 (having studied at the University of Liège, as the Polytechnic School in Delft had not yet developed its electrical engineering program).

In 1905, the first Dutch submarine—specially designed for service in tropical waters—was built at the De Schelde shipyard in Vlissingen. The vessel was originally named HNLMS O 1 and later renamed Luctor et Emergo. The submarine measured 20.42 by 4.08 meters, with a draft of 2.8 meters, and had a crew of ten.

Due to the escalating tensions in Europe, the submarine was commissioned on 15 July under the command of Schorer, who by then held the rank of *luitenant-ter-zee* 1st class (equivalent to naval commander). With assistance from the tugboat *Witte Zee* of L. Smit & Co’s Towing Service, which operated a fleet of 14 sea-going tugs at the time, the submarine was towed through the Suez Canal to Sabang in the Dutch East Indies.

Schorer later served as:

- Inspector of the Submarine Service
- Inspector at the Ministry of the Navy (1919–1925)
- Commander of the cruiser Sumatra (1925–1927)
- Chief of the Naval Materiel Division at the Ministry of the Navy (1927–1933)
- Vice Admiral (1929–1933)
- Adjutant in extraordinary service to H.M. Queen Wilhelmina

== Schorer Commission ==
The 1934 KLM Douglas DC-2 crash of the Uiver aircraft on 20 December 1934, was initially investigated by Dr. Hendricus van der Maas, head of the Aircraft department of the RSL (Rijks Studiedienst voor de Luchtvaart, 1919-1937). On 8 January 1935 he made his first report to the Luchtvaartdienst (LVD); written reports were not published. The “Permanente Ongevallen Commissie” (POC) of the RSL was adjusted on 7 February 1935 and came under the leadership of Schorer.

The technical report of the Schorer committee confirmed the findings of Van der Maas. In addition to this technical analysis, the committee also prepared a separate report addressing responsibility for the accident; however, this document was not made public at the time.

Nearly fifty years after the crash, in January 1984, the Dutch newspaper Het Vrije Volk obtained a copy of the report and published it. The report stated that KLM under Albert Plesman and minister Jacob Kalff were to be blamed and responsible for the accident. Given the unmade adjustements and the known dangers, KLM took too many risks in undertaking this flight and it was irresponsible to allow passengers on it.
