= Jan de Groot =

Jan de Groot may refer to:

- Jan de Groot (painter) (1650–1726), Dutch painter
- Jan Jakob Maria de Groot (1854–1921), Dutch sinologist and historian of religion
- Jan H. de Groot (1901–1990), Dutch poet, journalist, and resistance fighter.

== See also ==
- Johannes de Groot (1914–1972), Dutch mathematician
- John o' Groats, a village in Scotland
