= List of rectores magnifici of Delft University of Technology =

← A rector of a Dutch university is called a rector magnificus. The following people have been rector magnificus of Delft University of Technology or its predecessor, Technische Hogeschool Delft:

Period	Name	Image	Additional info
juli 1905 - augustus 1905	Jacob Kraus		
1905-1907	Sebastiaan Hoogewerff		
1907-1910	Stephanus Gerhard Everts		
1909-1913	Jacob Cardinaal		
1913-1916	Willem Karel Behrens		
1916-1919	Johan Christiaan Dijxhoorn		
1919-1920	Marc de Haas		
1920-1921	Johannes Nelemans		
1921-1922	J.A.G. van der Steur		
1922-1923	Louis van Royen		
1923-1924	Cornelis van der Bilt		
1924-1925	Clarence Feldmann		
1925-1926	Gerrit van Iterson jr.		
1926-1927	Willem Janssen van Raay		
1927-1928	NIcolaas Kist		
1928-1929	Karel Sluyterman		
1929-1930	Frans Westendorp		
1930-1931	Herman S. Hallo		
1931-1932	Henri ter Meulen		
1932-1933	Jan Adolf Grutterink		
1933-1934	Johannes George Rutgers		
1934-1935	Willem Reinders		
1935-1936	Gerardus Diehl		
1936-1937	Gerhard Elias		
1937-1938	Cornelis Biezeno		
1938-1939	Jan Schouten		
1939-May 1940	Joannes Antonius Veraart		
May 1940-February 1942	Cornelis Johannes van Nieuwenburg		
April 1942-September 1943	Henk Dorgelo		
1943-1944	Joan Muysken		
June 1945-1946	H.J. van der Maas		
1946-1947	Jacob Tienstra		
1947-1948	Hein Waterman		
1948-January 1949	Albert Kluyver		
1949-1951	Cornelis Biezeno		
1951-1959	Oene Bottema		
1959-1962	Ralph Kronig		
1962-1967	H.J. de Wijs		
1967-1970	Cornelis Verhagen		
1970 - 1973	Hans van Nauta Lemke		
1973-1975	H.B. Boerema		
1975-1976	Herman van Bekkum		
1976-1978	Leendert Huisman		
1978-1981	Frits Jan Kievits		
1981-1985	Bernard P.Th. Veltman		
1985-1988	Hans Dirken		
1989-1993	Pieter Alletinus Schenck		
1993-1997	Karel Wakker		
1997-1998	Johan Blaauwendraad		
1998-2002	Karel Wakker		
2002-2010	Jacob Fokkema		
2010-2018	Karel Luyben		
2018-2026	Tim van der Hagen		
2026-	Hester Bijl		
