= Death and state funeral of George V =

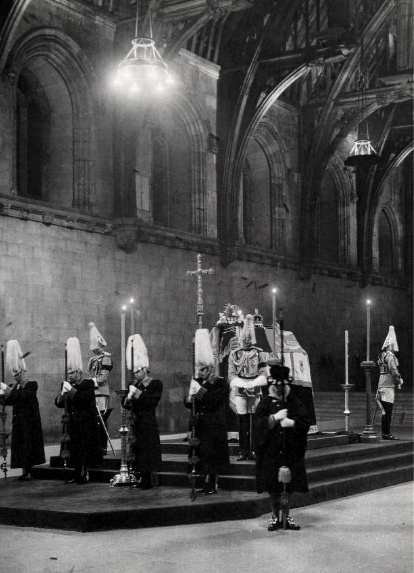
- George V lying in state, draped with the Royal Standard
- Date: 20 January 1936; (death); 28 January 1936; (state funeral)
- Location: Sandringham House; (place of death); Westminster Hall; (lying in state); St George's Chapel, Windsor Castle; (official ceremony)
- Cause: Non-voluntary euthanasia (death)
- Participants: British royal family

George V, King of the United Kingdom and the British Dominions, and Emperor of India, died at Sandringham House in Norfolk on 20 January 1936, at the age of 70. He was succeeded by the eldest son, Edward VIII, who abdicated later that year. On 23 January, the King's coffin was brought by train to Westminster where it lay in state for four days, during which more than 800,000 members of the public attended. On 28 January, the coffin was carried in procession to Paddington Station and then on to Windsor Castle where a relatively simple funeral service was held, broadcast live on radio.

== Death ==
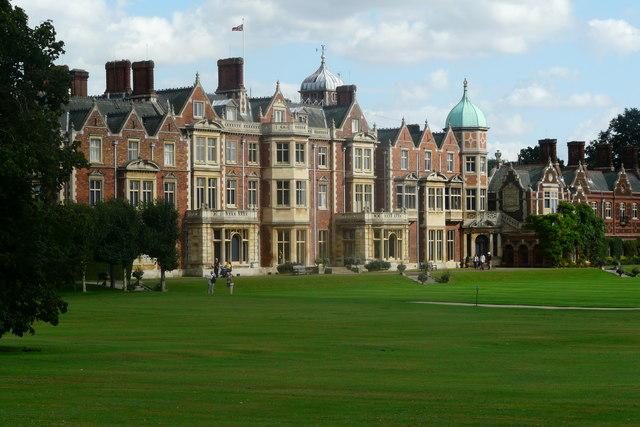
Sandringham House in Norfolk, where King George V died.

King George had suffered several bouts of serious illness since the First World War; he suffered from chronic bronchitis exacerbated by heavy smoking. By 1935 he required the occasional use of oxygen tanks kept at his bedside. By the end of that year, his personal physician, Lord Dawson of Penn, told the prime minister, Stanley Baldwin, that the king was "packing up his luggage and getting ready to depart".

In the new year of 1936, King George took to his bed at Sandringham House in Norfolk; family members were summoned on 16 and 17 January by an anxious Queen Mary. At 9:25 pm on Monday 20 January, Lord Dawson wrote a press bulletin on the back of a menu card: "the King's life is moving peacefully to its close". King George died at 11:55 pm with the queen and his children at his bedside and the Archbishop of Canterbury, Cosmo Lang, reciting prayers. It was revealed decades later from Dawson's account in his personal diary, that he had hastened the process by injecting an overdose of morphine and cocaine into the king's jugular vein, as "hours of waiting just for the mechanical end when all that is really life has departed only exhausts the onlookers", and that way the announcement would be in the morning broadsheet newspapers, rather than "the less appropriate evening journals".

== Sandringham to London ==
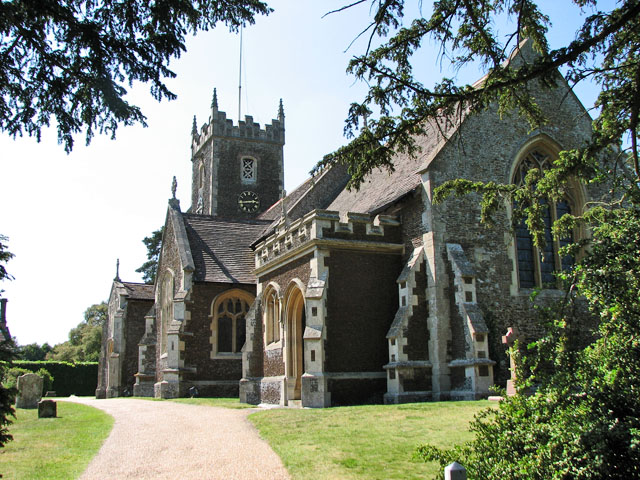
Church of St Mary Magdalene, Sandringham, where King George's coffin lay overnight on 22–23 January.

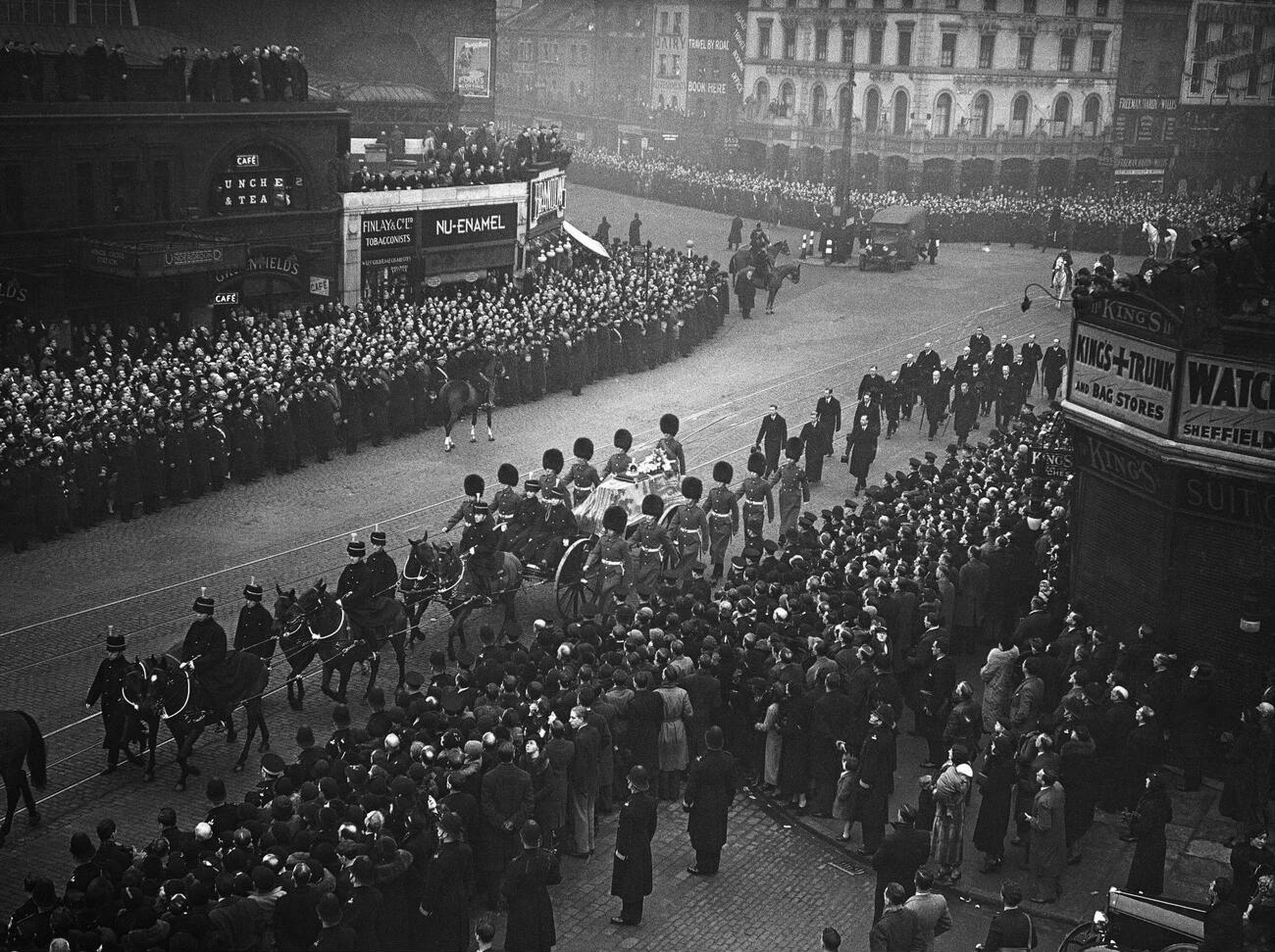
King George V’s coffin carried from King's Cross Station to Westminster Hall, followed by King Edward VIII and his brothers.

On the afternoon of 22 January (the day of the 35th anniversary of the death of Queen Victoria), the king's coffin was taken from Sandringham House to the parish church of St Mary Magdalene, where it lay in state overnight with an honour guard of estate workers. On the following morning, 23 January, the coffin was taken in a 2½ mile (4 kilometre) procession from the church to Wolferton railway station, with King Edward VIII and his brothers walking behind and the rest of the royal family in carriages. Also accompanying was the late king's grey pony Jock, led by a groom, and his parrot Charlotte, whose cage was carried by a servant.

The funeral train, hauled by Class B17 locomotive No. 2847 Helmingham Hall, arrived in London at King's Cross railway station and then the coffin was carried on a gun carriage escorted by Grenadier Guards through crowded but silent streets with King Edward and his brothers walking behind, arriving at Westminster Hall at four o'clock. As the coffin was carried into the hall by guardsmen, the cross pattee which surmounted the Imperial State Crown, fell off and landed in the street; Edward was heard to exclaim "Christ! What's going to happen next?"

== Lying in state ==
Upon entering the hall, the choirs of Westminster Abbey and the Chapel Royal sang Psalm 103; "Praise the Lord, O my soul". A short service was conducted by the Archbishop of Canterbury, which included the hymn, Praise, my soul, the King of heaven, at the suggestion of Queen Mary.

Following the departure of the royal family, Members of Parliament, led by the Lord Chancellor and the Speaker of the House of Commons, were the first to file past the catafalque to pay their respects. They were followed by ordinary members of the public, who formed a queue fifteen deep through the streets of Westminster; during the four days of the lying in state, 809,182 people were recorded to have passed through the hall. Also visiting were royalty and dignitaries from overseas who had arrived in London for the funeral. The doors of the hall were finally closed at 04:00 on Tuesday, 28 January.

=== Vigil of the Princes ===
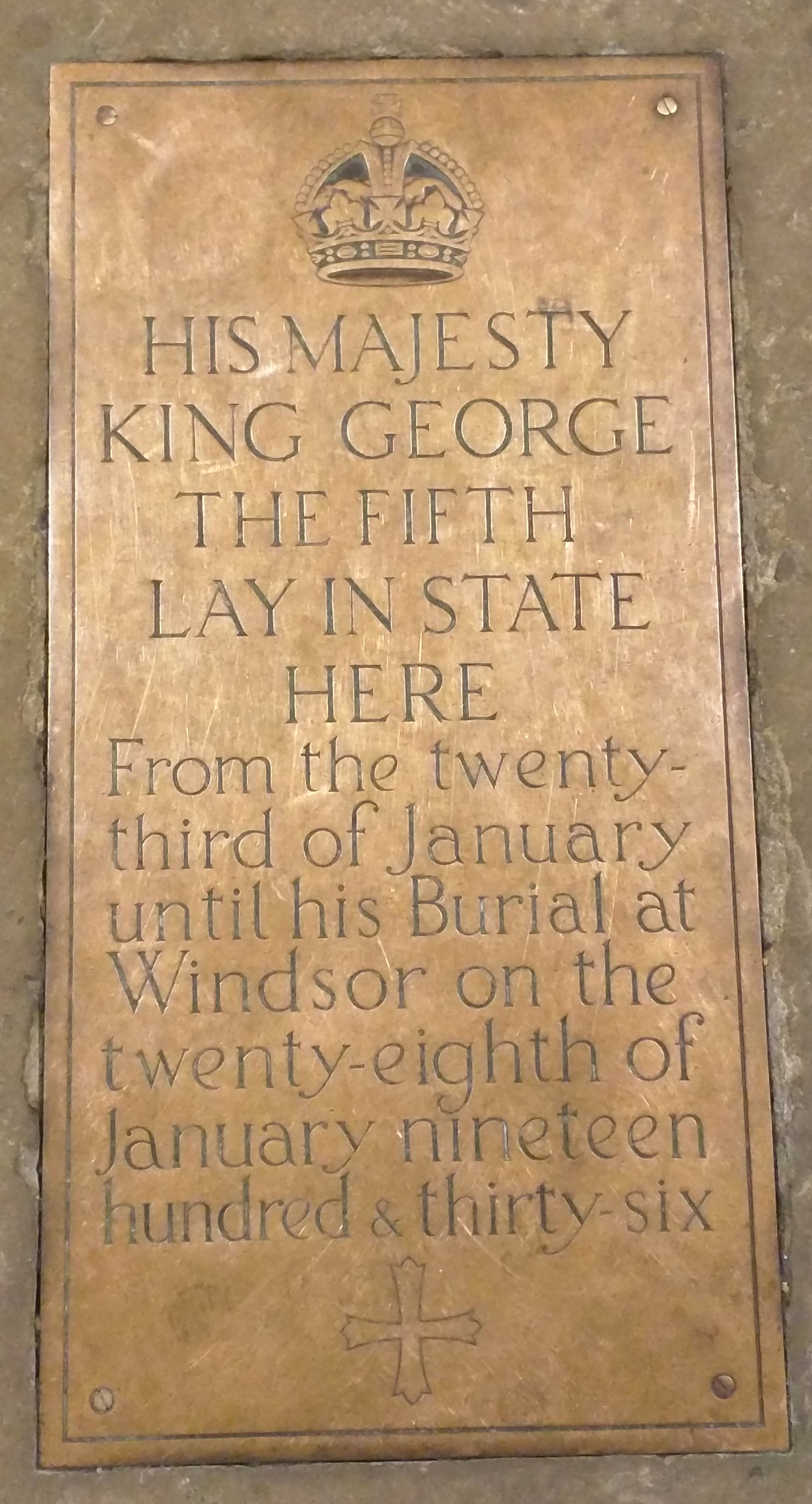
A plaque in Westminster Hall commemorating the lying in state

During the lying in state, the catafalque was guarded at all times by twelve men; four Yeomen of the Guard, four Gentlemen-at-Arms, and four officers of the Household Division, either the Foot Guards or the Household Cavalry. The guard was changed every twenty minutes, except for the Yeomen who were relieved every hour.

At midnight, after attending a state dinner at Buckingham Palace for the visiting dignitaries including five kings, the late king's four surviving sons, King Edward VIII, the Duke of York, the Duke of Gloucester, and the Duke of Kent, stood vigil replacing the four guards officers. This event became known as the Vigil of the Princes. They were dressed respectively in the full dress uniforms of the Welsh Guards, the Scots Guards, the 10th Royal Hussars and the Royal Navy. It was reported that many of the passing mourners failed to recognise the King and the princes.

== London to Windsor ==
The funeral procession began at 9:45 am on Tuesday, 28 January, with the tolling of Big Ben. The coffin was placed on the Royal Navy State Funeral Gun Carriage, drawn by a team of 142 naval ratings. Following the gun carriage on foot were the king and the Royal Dukes, after which came the kings of Denmark, Norway, Romania, Bulgaria and Belgium, along with the President of France and other dignitaries. The queen, the Princess Royal and the Royal Duchesses travelled in horse-drawn state coaches. The procession was watched by huge crowds along the route, often twelve deep, many of whom had braved overnight rain. Some 150 members of the public had to be taken to hospital and it was reported that first aiders had treated 10,000 cases of fainting. In some places, the crowd had burst through the police cordon, delaying the proceedings by 22 minutes. The route from Westminster Hall passed down Whitehall to Trafalgar Square, under Admiralty Arch into The Mall, turning into St James's Street and then along Piccadilly to Hyde Park Corner. Entering Hyde Park, the procession passed along the East Carriage Road to Marble Arch and from there to Paddington Station via Edgware Road.

On arrival at Paddington Station, the coffin was loaded onto the funeral train, hauled by 4073 Class locomotive No. 4082 Windsor Castle, which left at around midday. A further six special trains carrying dignitaries had preceded it, leaving at 10-minute intervals. At Windsor & Eton railway station, the coffin was transferred to the state gun carriage again and drawn through the streets of the town towards Windsor Castle, escorted by the Coldstream Guards. The procession moved along the road (today the B3022) from the station past the castle and St John the Baptist Church before turning into Park Street at the Soldier's Statue and eventually moving up the Long Walk towards the castle. At St George's Chapel, sailors used boatswain's calls to signal "Admiral on board" and "Admiral over the side", followed by Highland pipers playing the lament, Flowers of the Forest. The king and his brothers saluted as the coffin was carried up the chapel steps.

== Funeral service ==
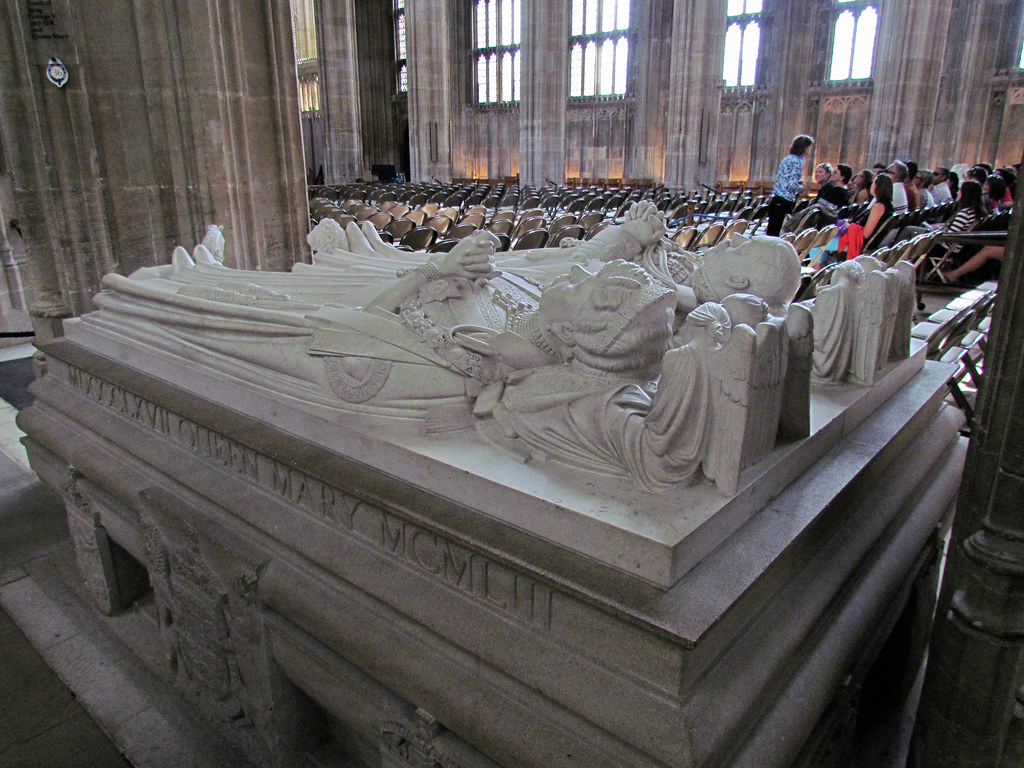
Monumental tomb of King George V and Queen Mary at St George's Chapel, Windsor

The service itself was a fairly simple affair following the text of the Book of Common Prayer and lacking any additional anthems, which had been a feature of other royal funerals. Instead, a congregational hymn, Abide with me, was included. The last funeral sentence, I heard a Voice from Heaven, was sung to a setting by Sir John Goss, rather than the traditional music by William Croft. After the Garter Principal King of Arms had pronounced the style of the late king, God be in my Head by Sir Henry Walford Davies was sung.

Initially interred in the Royal Vault beneath the Quire at St George's Chapel, King George's body was transferred to a monumental sarcophagus in the North Nave Aisle on 27 February 1939. It is surmounted by tomb effigies of George and Mary, sculpted by Sir William Reid Dick (1878–1961). Queen Mary was laid to rest next to her husband following her funeral at St George's on 31 March 1953.

The service was broadcast live on BBC Radio and relayed across the empire; also newsreel films of the funeral processions were later shown in cinemas. Ecumenical memorial services were held in churches and chapels throughout the country, for which a special "form of service" had been printed, to be used "either on the Day of the Funeral or on the Most Convenient Day within the Octave, by His Majesty's Special Command".

== Guests ==
As per report in London Gazette.

=== British royal family ===
==== The House of Windsor ====
- Queen Mary, the late King's widow
  - The King, the late King's son
  - The Duke and Duchess of York, the late King's son and daughter-in-law
  - The Princess Royal and the Earl of Harewood, the late King's daughter and son-in-law
    - Viscount Lascelles, the late King's grandson
    - The Hon. Gerald Lascelles, the late King's grandson
  - The Duke and Duchess of Gloucester, the late King's son and daughter-in-law
  - The Duke and Duchess of Kent, the late King's son and daughter-in-law (also first cousin once removed)
- Princess and Prince Arthur of Connaught, the late King's niece and her husband, the late King's first cousin (representing the Duke of Connaught and Strathearn)
  - Earl of Macduff, the late King's great-nephew
- Lady Maud and Lord Carnegie, the late King's niece and nephew-in-law
- The Queen and King of Norway, the late King's sister and brother-in-law (also first cousin)
  - The Crown Prince of Norway, the late King's nephew
- Princess Helena Victoria, the late King's first cousin
- Princess Marie Louise, the late King's first cousin
- Lady Patricia Ramsay, the late King's first cousin
  - Alexander Ramsay, the late King's first cousin once removed
- The Earl of Athlone and Princess Alice, Countess of Athlone, the late King's brother-in-law and sister-in-law (also the late King's first cousin)
  - Lady May and Henry Abel Smith, the late King's niece and nephew-in-law

==== Teck-Cambridge family ====
- The Marquess and Marchioness of Cambridge, the late King's nephew and niece-in-law
  - Lady Mary Cambridge, the late King's great-niece
- The Duchess and Duke of Beaufort, the late King's niece and nephew-in-law
- Lady Helena Gibbs, the late King's niece
- Lord Frederick Cambridge, the late King's nephew

==== Mountbatten family ====
- The Dowager Marchioness of Milford Haven, the late King's first cousin
  - The Marquess and Marchioness of Milford Haven, the late King's first cousin once removed and his wife
  - Lord Louis Mountbatten, the late King's first cousin once removed
- The Marquess of Carisbrooke, the late King's first cousin
  - Lady Iris Mountbatten, the late King's first cousin once removed

=== Foreign royalty ===
- The King of Denmark and Iceland, the late King's first cousin
  - The Crown Princess of Denmark, the late King's first cousin once removed
- Prince Axel of Denmark, the late King's first cousin
- Queen Victoria Eugenie of Spain, the late King's first cousin
- Infanta Beatrice and Infante Alfonso of Spain, the late King's first cousin and her husband
  - Infante Álvaro of Spain, the late King's first cousin once removed
- The Duke and Duchess of Saxe-Coburg and Gotha, the late King's first cousin and his wife
- (Kingdom of Greece) Prince George of Greece and Denmark, the late King's first cousin
- (Kingdom of Greece) Prince Nicholas of Greece and Denmark, the late King's first cousin (also father of the late King's daughter-in-law)
- (Kingdom of Yugoslavia) The Prince Regent of Yugoslavia, husband of the late King's first cousin once removed
- (Kingdom of Greece) The Crown Prince of Greece, the late King's double first cousin once removed (representing the King of the Hellenes)
- (Kingdom of Romania) The King of Romania, the late King's first cousin once removed
- The Crown Princess and Crown Prince of Sweden, the late King's first cousin once removed and her husband (also widower of the late King's first cousin) (representing the King of Sweden)
- The Hereditary Grand Duke of Hesse, the late King's first cousin once removed
- Prince Ernest Augustus of Hanover, the late King's first cousin once removed
- Grand Duke Dmitri Pavlovich of Russia, the late King's first cousin once removed
- Prince Frederick of Prussia, the late King's first cousin twice removed
- Prince Félix of Luxembourg, husband of the late King's second cousin once removed (representing the Grand Duchess of Luxembourg)
- (Belgium) The King of the Belgians, the late King's third cousin (also widower of the late King's first cousin once removed)
- (Belgium) The Count of Flanders, the late King's third cousin
- (Tsardom of Bulgaria (1908–1946)) The Tsar of the Bulgarians, the late King's third cousin
- The Duke of Nemours, the late King's third cousin
- (Kingdom of Italy) The Prince of Piedmont, husband of the late King's third cousin (representing the King of Italy)
- (Kingdom of Egypt) The Prince of the Sa'id (representing the King of Egypt)
- (Kingdom of Iraq) Prince Zeid bin Hussein (representing the King of Iraq)
- (Thailand) Prince Chula Chakrabongse (representing the King of Siam)
- (Albanian Kingdom (1928–1939)) Prince Salih Doshishti (representing the King of the Albanians)
- The Duke of Braganza
- The Raja of Sawantwadi
- The Maharaja of Dhrangadhra
- Prince Ernst Rüdiger Starhemberg
- Prince Franz of Windisch-Graetz

=== Other dignitaries ===
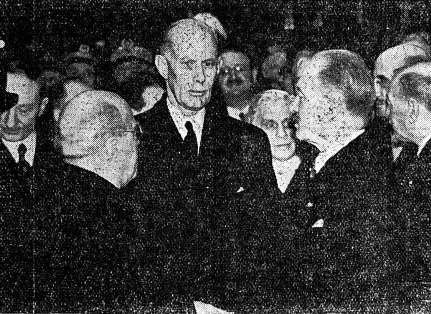
Departure of the French delegation from Gare du Nord, Paris. From left to right: Albert Sarraut, (President of the Council, i.e. Prime Minister), John Clerk (British Ambassador to Paris), Albert Lebrun (President of the Republic).

- (United Kingdom) The Prime Minister
- The Prime Minister of Canada
- Field Marshal Baron Carl Gustaf Emil Mannerheim, former Regent of Finland
- (Finland) Tancred Borenius
- The President of France
- (France) The French Foreign Minister
- (France) François Piétri
- (France) Jean Chiappe
- The Prime Minister of Belgium
- (Belgium) The Belgian Minister of Defense
- Norman Davis, former United States Under Secretary of State
- Kazimierz Sosnkowski
- George Lodewijk Schorer
- Johan Laidoner
- The German Foreign Minister
- The Hungarian Foreign Minister
- The Romanian Foreign Minister
- The Romanian Arts Minister
- The Chinese Ambassador
- The Iranian Ambadassor
- The Nepali Ambassador
- The Saudi Arabian Ambassador
- The Uruguayian Ambassador
- The Canadian High Commissioner
- The Australian High Commissioner
- The New Zealand High Commissioner
- The South African High Commissioner
- The Irish High Commissioner

=== Nobility ===
- The Duke of Norfolk
- The Duchess of Devonshire
- The Marquess of Anglesey
- The Earl of Cavan
- The Earl of Cork and Orrery
- The Earl Beatty
- The Earl of Lucan
- The Earl of Granard
- The Earl of Shaftesbury
- The Earl of Dunmore
- The Earl of Feversham
- The Earl of Munster
- The Viscount Hampden
- The Viscount Gage
- The Lord Trenchard
- The Lord Milne
- The Lord Elphinstone (the Duchess of York’s brother-in-law)
- The Lord Templemore
- The Lord Wigram
- The Lord Dawson of Penn
- The Lord Colebrooke
- The Lord Howard of Penrith
- Viscount Lewisham
- Lord Claud Hamilton
- The Hon. Sir Reginald Drax
- The Hon. Sir Francis Gathorne-Hardy
- The Hon. Sir Stanley Colville
- The Hon. Sir George Crichton
- The Hon. Sir Herbert Meade-Fetherstonhaugh
- The Hon. Sir Hubert Brand
- The Hon. Sir Montague Eliot
- The Hon. Sir Piers Legh
- The Hon. Alexander Hardinge

== See also ==
- Death and state funeral of Queen Victoria
- Death and state funeral of Edward VII
- Death and state funeral of George VI
- Death and state funeral of Elizabeth II
- State funerals in the United Kingdom
