= Hendricus van der Maas =

Dutch aeronautical engineer and professor (1899-1987)

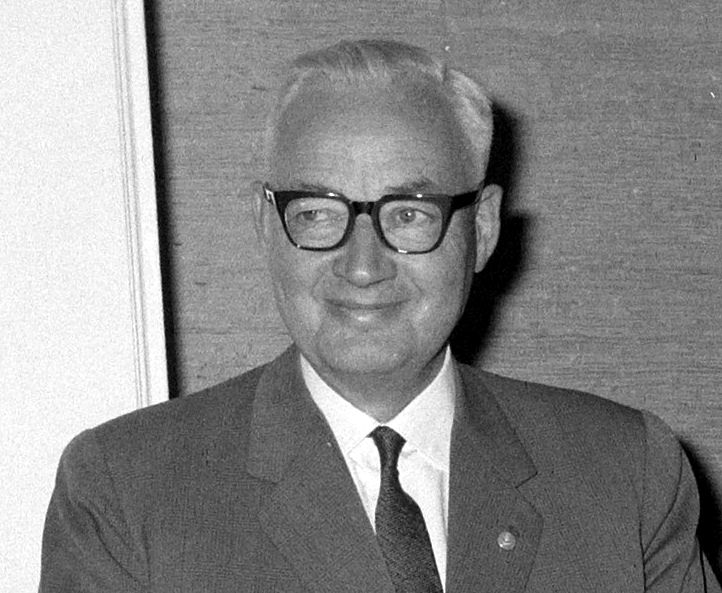
- Van der Maaa in 1962
- Born: Hendricus Jacobus van der Maas; 19 October 1899; Amsterdam, Netherlands
- Died: 24 February 1987 (aged 87); Oud-Beijerland, Netherlands
- Education: Delft University of Technology
- Occupations: Aeronautical engineer, professor
- Known for: Aircraft stability research, founding Dutch aeronautics programs
- Spouse: Henderica Suk (m. 1925–1975)
- Children: 12
- Awards: Member of the Royal Netherlands Academy of Arts and Sciences

Hendricus Jacobus van der Maas (19 October 1899 – 24 February 1987) was a Dutch engineer, professor, and aviation pioneer. He played a significant role in the development of aircraft design and aerospace research in the Netherlands during the 20th century.

== Early life and education ==
Van der Maas was born in Amsterdam into a devout Reformed Christian family. After his father died when he was eight, he helped support his family from a young age. He studied at the Middelbare Technische School and passed the state exam in 1918. He received a scholarship to attend the Technische Hoogeschool in Delft (now Delft University of Technology), graduating in 1923 as a maritime engineer.

== Career ==
Van der Maas joined the Rijksstudiedienst voor de Luchtvaart (RSL) in 1923, where he worked on airworthiness inspections and flight testing. He earned his pilot’s license in 1925 and developed a focus on aircraft stability and control. He completed his doctoral dissertation in 1929 on this topic.

He investigated the 1934 KLM Douglas DC-2 crash of the KLM aircraft Uiver and contributed to understanding flight safety issues at the time.

In 1939, Van der Maas became the first professor of aircraft engineering at Delft. Despite the challenges of World War II, he developed a curriculum and helped establish the field academically. He went into hiding in 1944 after refusing to accept the occupier’s loyalty declaration.

After the war, he became rector magnificus of Delft and led efforts to rebuild Dutch aviation. He was instrumental in founding the Netherlands Agency for Aerospace Programmes (NIVR) and chaired the Nationaal Luchtvaart Laboratorium (NLL) from 1948 to 1971.

Van der Maas played a central role in the development of the Fokker F-27 and Fokker F-28, promoting the use of turboprop engines and lightweight construction. His support led to the F-27 becoming Fokker’s most successful aircraft.

== International contributions ==
In 1952, Van der Maas co-founded the NATO Advisory Group for Aeronautical Research and Development (AGARD) and served as the Dutch delegate until 1971. In 1957, he helped establish the International Council of the Aeronautical Sciences (ICAS).

== Recognition and legacy ==
Van der Maas was elected to the Royal Netherlands Academy of Arts and Sciences (KNAW) in 1959 for his scientific achievements.

He also contributed to the Netherlands' entry into European space research organizations and supported the development of the Astronomical Netherlands Satellite (ANS), launched in 1974.

Following his retirement in 1967, he gradually withdrew from public life. After the death of his wife in 1975, his health declined. He died in 1987 in Oud-Beijerland at the age of 87.

== See also ==
- List of rectores magnifici of Delft University of Technology
