= Herman van Bekkum =

Dutch organic chemist (1932–2020)

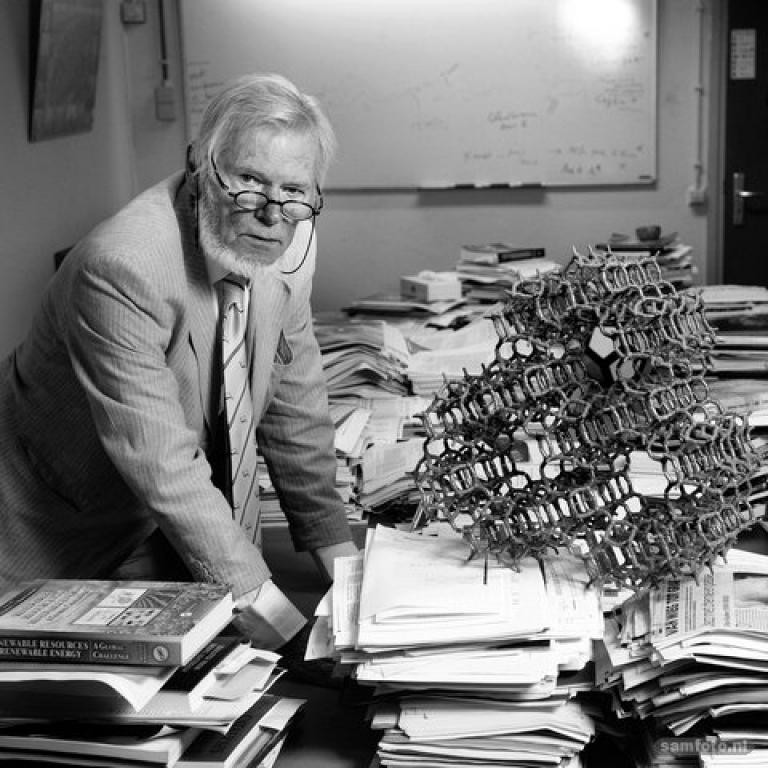
Herman van Bekkum (1978)

Herman van Bekkum (26 September 1932 – 30 November 2020) was a Dutch organic chemist. He was professor of Catalysis in Organic Chemistry between 1971 and 1998 at Delft University of Technology. He served as rector magnificus of the university between 1975 and 1976. He was an expert in the field of carbohydrate chemistry and zeolites.

== Career ==
Van Bekkum was born on 26 September 1932 in Rotterdam. He studied technological chemistry at Delft University of Technology and graduated in 1959. He subsequently worked two years for Royal Dutch Shell before returning to Delft University to work as lecturer. In 1971 he was named professor of Catalysis in Organic Chemistry. From 1975 to 1976 he served as rector magnificus of the university. As professor van Bekkum specialized in carbohydrate chemistry and the study of zeolites. In 1995 van Bekkum was appointed as the first president of the newly-founded Federation of the European Zeolite Association.

In 1998 he officially retired, however, by 2013 he was still working at the university. In his period at Delft University van Bekkum was doctoral advisor to 75 students.

Van Bekkum was elected member of the Royal Netherlands Academy of Arts and Sciences in 1995. He became an honorary member of the Royal Netherlands Chemical Society in 1998.

Apart from his career in chemistry van Bekkum was a competitive chess player.

He died on 30 November 2020 in Rotterdam, at age 88.
