= 1939 KLM Douglas DC-3 shooting =

1939 airliner shooting accident

Shooting of the Mees
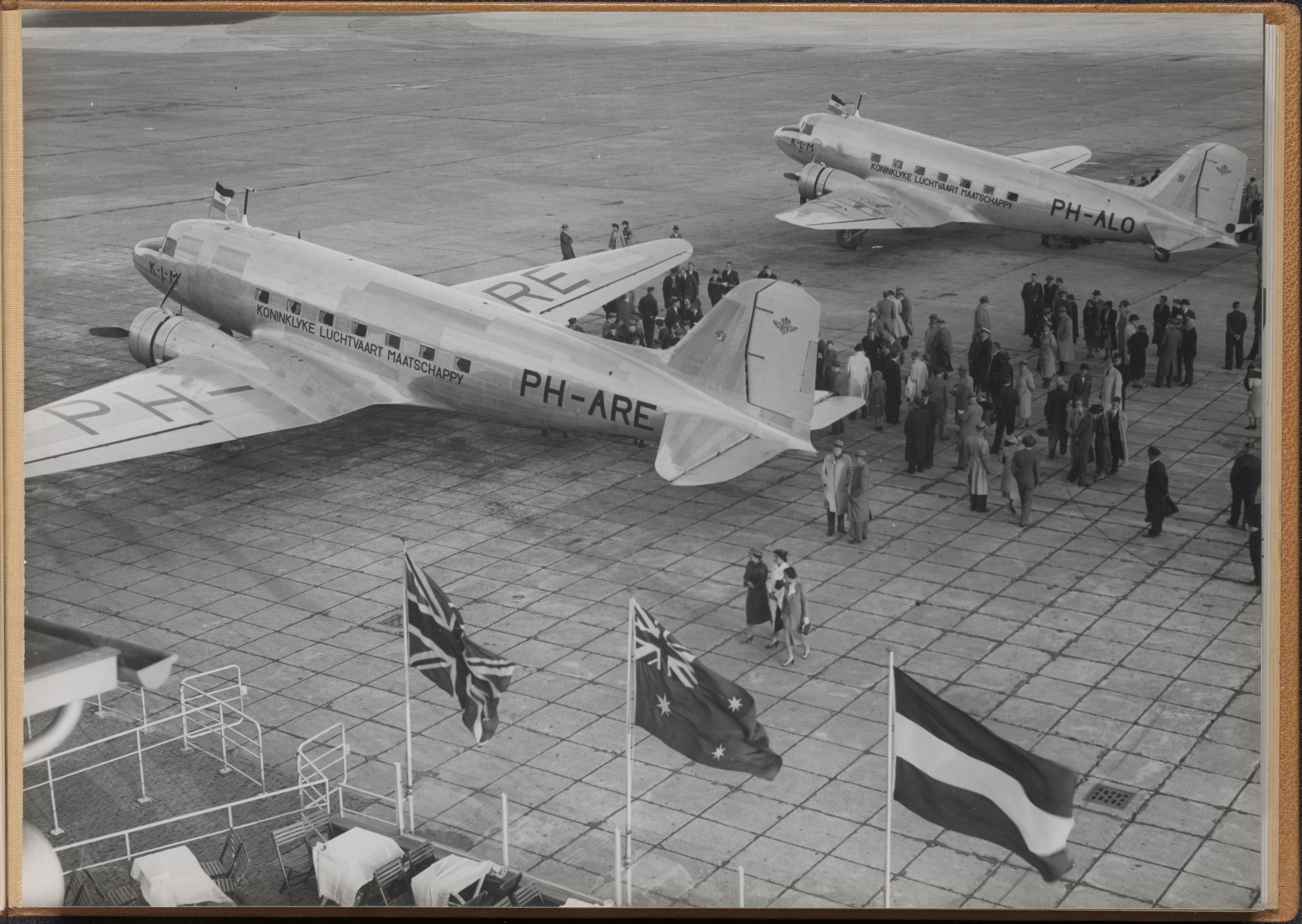
- Similar KLM Douglas DC-3's as aircraft involved

Occurrence
- Date: 26 September 1939
- Summary: Shot at by German aircraft; forced continuation of flight
- Site: North Sea, approx. 120 km northwest of Heligoland

Aircraft
- Aircraft type: Douglas DC-3-194G
- Operator: KLM
- Registration: PH-ASM
- Flight origin: Copenhagen, Denmark
- Destination: Schiphol Airport, Amsterdam, Netherlands
- Occupants: 12
- Passengers: 9
- Crew: 3
- Fatalities: 1
- Injuries: 0
- Survivors: 11

1939 KLM Douglas DC-3 shooting or Shooting of the Mees refers to an incident on 26 September 1939 in which a regular passenger flight operated by KLM with the Douglas DC-3 named "Mees" (translated: Tit) (registration PH-ASM), en route from Copenhagen, Denmark to Amsterdam, Netherlands (both countries were neutral at the time), was attacked by a German aircraft, resulting in the death of one passenger.

As a result of this shooting, the Mees became the first passenger aircraft in Europe to be fired upon.

The incident exposed the dangers faced by neutral civil aviation during wartime and prompted the introduction of clearer aircraft identification measures, including new military markings, and KLM and other countries repainting its planes in bright orange to prevent misidentification.

== Background ==
At the outbreak of the Second World War, the Netherlands maintained neutrality, but civil aviation operations still carried significant risks. KLM continued operating international flights, including routes between neutral countries such as Denmark and the Netherlands.

== Flight ==
On 26 September 1939, the aircraft departed Copenhagen for Amsterdam with nine passengers and crew under the command of Captain Jan Moll. At approximately 14:10, while flying at an altitude of about 800 metres and roughly 120 km northwest of Heligoland, the aircraft was attacked from behind by a seaplane.

The attack was first noticed by the stewardess, who heard unusual sounds at the rear of the aircraft and alerted the cockpit. The aircraft was fired upon for several minutes, with bullets striking mainly the rear fuselage and baggage compartment.

Captain Moll descended into cloud cover, after which the attacking aircraft broke off the engagement, allowing the flight to continue to Schiphol.

== Casualties ==
During the attack, a 38-year-old Swedish passenger, Gustav Robert Lamm from Malmö, was struck by a bullet that penetrated the cabin. He died shortly afterwards in his seat. Most other passengers were largely unaware of the situation during the flight. After landing at Schiphol, medical personnel confirmed the passenger's death.

== Damage ==
Inspection of the aircraft revealed extensive damage, with approximately 50 bullet holes in the fuselage, including hits to the baggage compartment, wing, and a fuel tank. One of the landing gear tyres was also found to be deflated due to the attack. The involved aircraft was repaired.

== Aftermath ==
=== German response ===
The German authorities later stated that the attack was the result of a "regrettable combination of circumstances". According to their explanation, the aircraft could not be clearly identified at a distance and resembled an enemy aircraft. The attacking crew reportedly ceased fire once the aircraft was recognized as Dutch, and Germany issued official apologies.

=== Aircraft adaptations ===
The incident highlighted the risks faced by neutral civil aviation during wartime and led to discussions about improving aircraft recognition. KLM and other airlines explored measures such as more visible markings and repainting aircraft to reduce the likelihood of misidentification.

From 1 October 1939, military aircraft of the Royal Netherlands Navy and Royal Netherlands Army would carry new identification markings: orange triangles with black borders on wings and fuselage, and fully orange vertical tails with a black outline.

KLM subsequently decided to paint its aircraft in bright orange and apply large "Holland" markings to improve visibility and reduce the risk of being mistaken for military aircraft, including the repaired involved aircraft. These Dutch aircraft are nicknamed "Orange Birds".

Various foreign aircraft, including some of German manufacture, were also painted in orange.
