= Wim Beekman =

Dutch aviator (1895-1934)

Willem Beekman
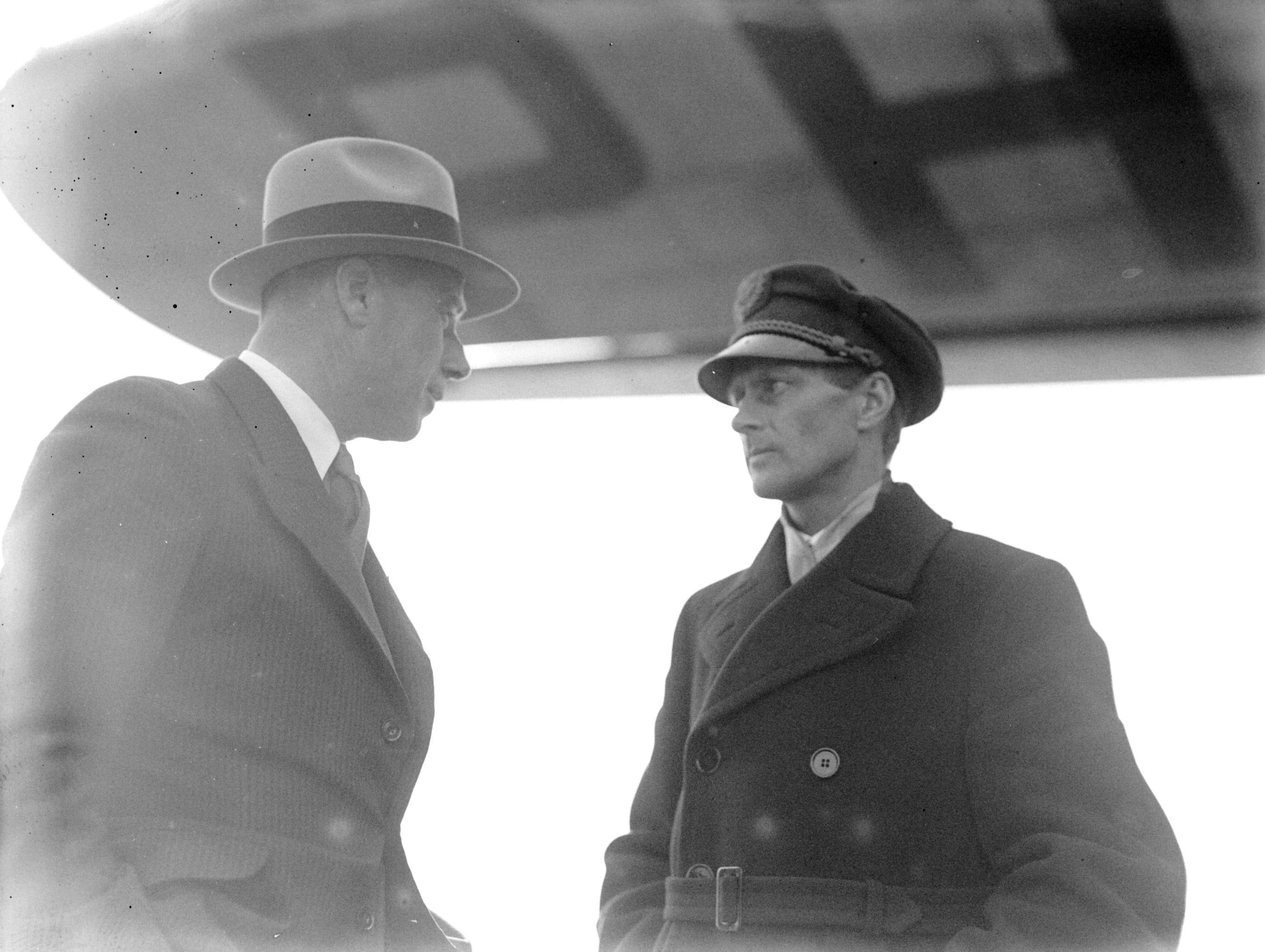
- Beekman (right) in 1934
- Born: Wilhelm Marie Okko Anne Beekman; March 15, 1895; Brouwershaven, Netherlands
- Died: December 20, 1934 (aged 39); Near Rutbah Wells, Iraq (then Mandatory Iraq)
- Occupation: Airline pilot
- Employer: KLM Royal Dutch Airlines
- Known for: Captain of the DC-2 Uiver

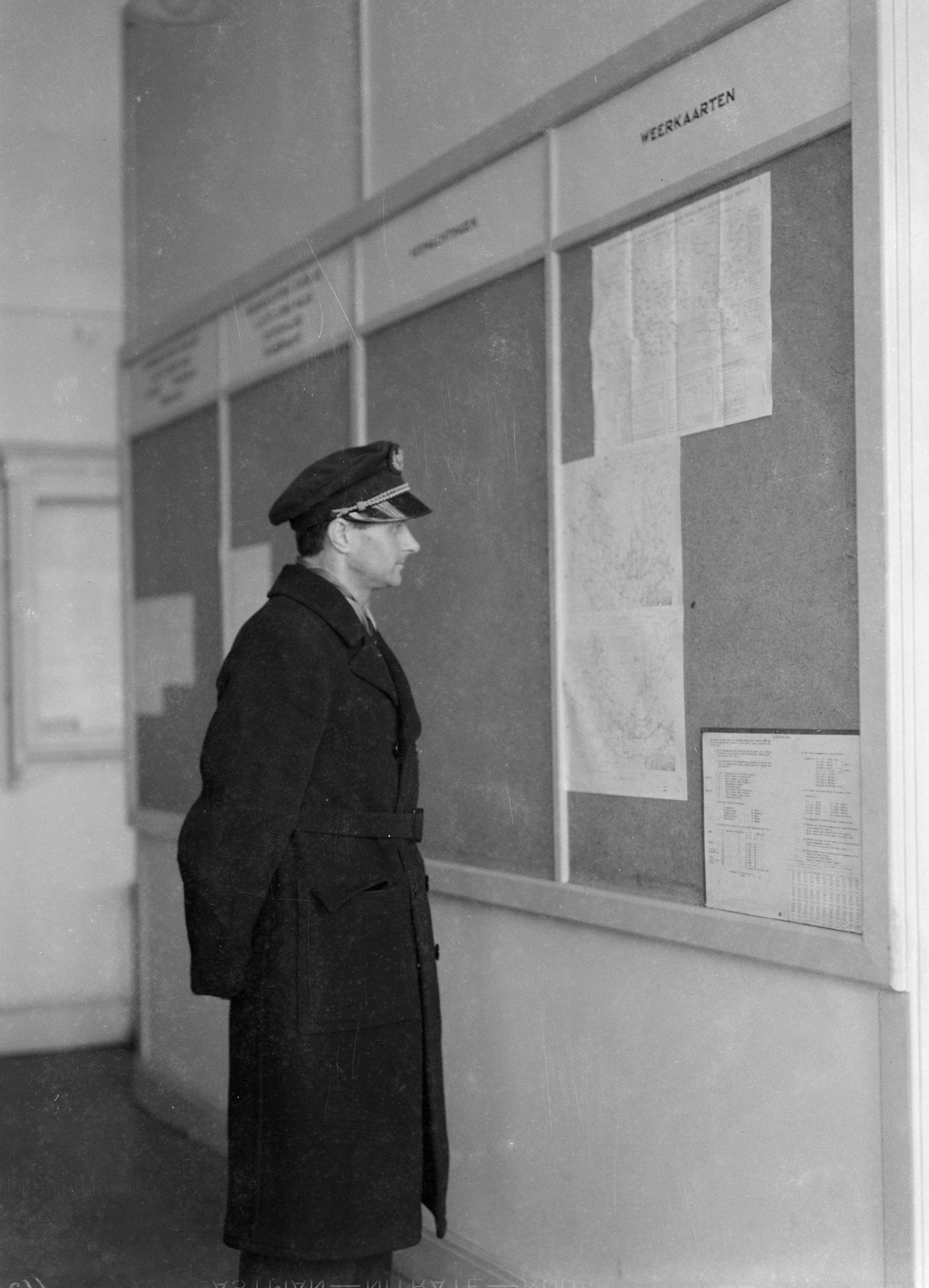
Beekman studying weather maps in October 1934

Wilhelm Marie Okko Anne “Willem” Beekman also known as Wim Beekman (15 March 1895 – 20 December 1934) was a Dutch aviator. He was one of the pioneering aviators of KLM Royal Dutch Airlines and became and senior KLM captain. He was the pilot of the DC-2 Uiver that crashed in December 1934 during a long-distance flight to the Dutch East Indies.

== Early life and career ==
Beekman was born in Brouwershaven, Netherlands in the province of Zeeland. Shortly after his birth, his father was appointed bailiff in Gulpen in the province of Limburg where he grew up. He attended Hogere Burgerschool in Maastricht. During his military service he served as a pilot at Soesterberg. Afterwards he joined the aviation division and earned his pilot's license on 8 December 1922. He was employed by KLM starting 14 May 1924.

During his career, Beekman became one of KLM’s most experienced long-distance pilots, especially on the Amsterdam–Batavia route (modern-day Jakarta, Indonesia). He was known for his composure and professionalism during flights through difficult and often unpredictable weather conditions. He completed a total of 18 return flights to the Dutch East Indies successfully; at the time a notable number.

== The 1934 Uiver crash ==
In December 1934, Beekman captained a special DC-2 flight from Amsterdam to Batavia, as part of KLM's efforts to establish rapid mail and passenger connections to the Dutch colonies. The aircraft, known as the Uiver, had become famous for its earlier participation in the 1934 MacRobertson Air Race.

While flying over the Syrian desert near Rutbah Wells, the aircraft encountered a violent thunderstorm during the night. The DC-2 crashed and burned down. All seven people on board died, including Beekman and co-pilot Jan van Dijk. It was later stated that Beekman initially refused to start the flight because he did not trust the plane and was tired. Eventually Beekman started the flight against his will.

A memorial service was held for the crew and passengers. All victims were buried at the English cemetery in Baghdad on 23 December 1934. They were however exhumed again, on 22 January 1936. With the "Drachenfels" they were transported to the Netherlands. Beekman was reburied on 1 April 1936 at the cemetery in Muiderberg.

== Personal life ==
Beekman was married and had a daughter, Inge Beekman, who later worked as a flight attendant for KLM and also appeared in Dutch film and television productions.
