= Eduard Willem Walch =

Dutch epidemiologists

- Born: 9 August 1890; Schiedam, the Netherlands
- Died: 20 December 1934 (aged 44); Rutbah Wells, Iraq
- Education: University of Amsterdam
- Spouse: Gijsbertha Berendina Sorgdrager
- Scientific career
- Fields: Epidemiology, Hygiene
- Institutions: University of Amsterdam, Amsterdam; Sanatorium Senembah Mij, Sumatra; United States; Instituut voor tropische hygiëne, Amsterdam; Medical University, Batavia

Eduard Willem Walch (9 August 1890 – 20 December 1934) was a Dutch professor of health science in the Dutch East Indies with expertise in hygiene and malaria control.

== Career ==
Walch attended Hogere Burgerschool and studied at the University of Amsterdam. He was an assistant of professor Huitinga. He did research into bacteriology and hygiene.

Walch went together his wife to Sumatra, the Dutch East Indies in 1919 starting working at Sanatorium Senembah Mij where he replaced second physician L. Pel. Walch discovered among others that mite larvae that carry pseudotyphoid can also parasitize birds. These birds could so transmit this over great distances. It is stated that tropical hygiene improved due to the research he did together with Wilhelm Schüffner and Keukenschrijver. With a 1923-1924 scholarship of the Rockefeller Foundation he went together with his wife in 1924 to the United States to study hygiene methods and statistics. In the United States he became doctor in the hygiene. Afterwards he worked at the Instituut voor tropische hygiëne (Institute for tropical hygiene) in Amsterdam. He moved back to the Dutch East Indies in 1925 where he became government doctor at the malaria control service. Two years later he became the chief of this service replacing Rodenwaldt. In February 1930 he was appointed full professor of hygiene at the Medical University in Batavia.

Walch was a member of the Dutch delegation and speaker at the Malaria Congress in Algiers in May 1930, together with Nicolaas Swellengrebel and Wilhelm Schüffner. Together with Cornelis de Langen and Willem Alphonse Mijsberg he represented the government of the Dutch East Indies at the International Congress of tropical medicine in Amsterdam in May 1932. In 1933 he spent several months on leave in the Netherlands and went with his wife via China and America, where they did some research, back to the Dutch East Indies. At the 1933 congress of the Far Eastern Association of Tropical Medicine in Nanking, China, where he was a delegate of the Dutch East Indies government, he was elected permanent secretary.

== Personal life and death ==
Walch was born on 9 August 1890 in Schiedam. His father was a French language teacher at the University of Amsterdam. Walch also learned speaking French as he later also spoke at an international congress in French.

Walch played chess and was a member of the students’ Amsterdamsch Schaakgenootschap Philidor. In 1910, Walch lost to American Norman T. Whitaker in a university chess competition of the University of Amsterdam against the University of Pennsylvania.

On 2 May 1918 Walch married to Gijsbertha Berendina Sorgdrager (1882-1964) who was also a doctor. They worked together at many points in time and she became director of Budi Utomo.

In mid-1933 his sister died in the Netherlands, who had also worked in the Dutch East Indies as a plague doctor at the C.B.Z. in Semarang; and who had retired in 1932. On 5 December 1934 he went to the Netherlands due to illness of his mother. During the return flight, after the fourth stopover in Cairo, the airplane crashed in the desert in Iraq, 16 kilometres south of Rutbah Wells and burned out. All three passengers and four crew members, including Walch, were killed.
