= Jan Moll =

Dutch aviator (1900–1988)

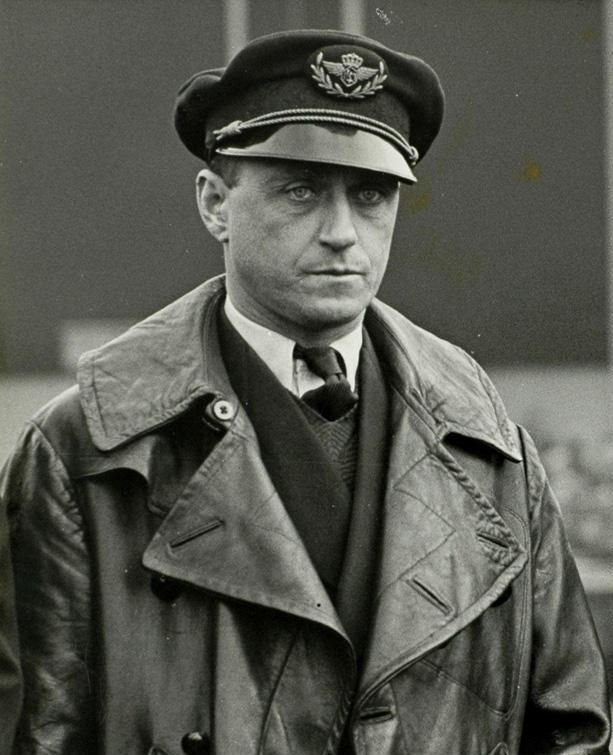
- Moll in 1934
- Born: Jan Johannes Moll; 6 March 1900; Rotterdam, Netherlands
- Died: 12 December 1988 (aged 88); Aalsmeer, Netherlands
- Occupation: Aviator
- Employer: KLM
- Known for: Uiver flight, London–Melbourne race (1934); Shooting of the Mees (1939)

Jan Johannes Moll (6 March 1900 – 12 December 1988) was a Dutch aviator and KLM pilot, regarded as a pioneer of early commercial aviation in the Netherlands.

== Biography ==
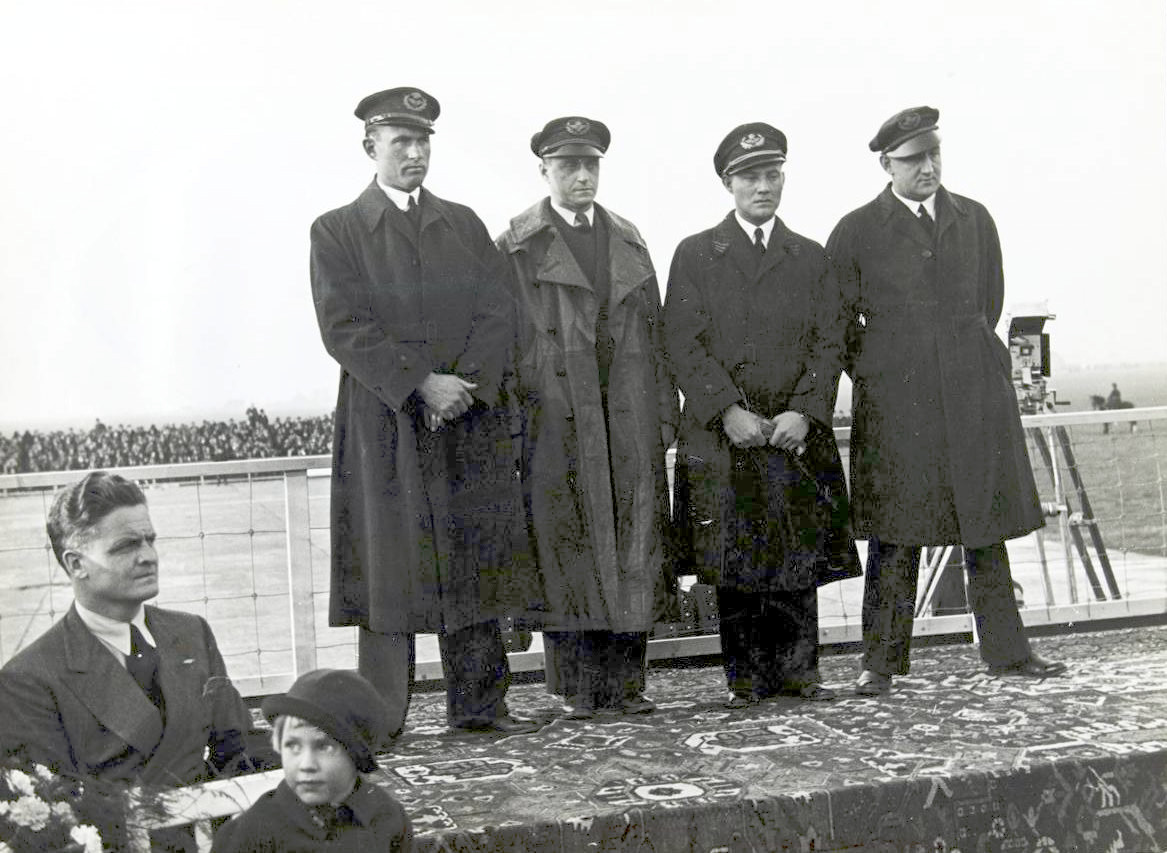
Homage to the Uiver crew after completing the Melbourne race (1934)

Moll was born in Rotterdam and initially trained at the Maritime School in Vlissingen, after which he worked in Batavia. He later joined the Military Aviation branch of the Royal Netherlands East Indies Army (KNIL) where he obtained his pilot training before returning to the Netherlands to pursue a career in civil aviation.

He joined KLM in 1927 (or 1928 according to contemporary reports) and became one of its early pilots. In 1934, Moll gained international recognition as second pilot of the Douglas DC-2 Uiver, which achieved success in the London–Melbourne air race.

Moll was the captain of the KLM Douglas DC-3 (named Mees) during the 26 September 1939 Shooting of the Mees incident in which the aircraft was attacked by a German plane while carrying out a regular passenger flight between Copenhagen and Amsterdam.

During World War II, Moll was involved in military aviation activities. After the Battle of Rotterdam, he managed to reach Dunkirk and subsequently traveled to the United Kingdom. There he helped establish No. 320 Squadron and later served with the Royal Air Force, flying transatlantic routes and special missions, including flights to Moscow.

After the war, he returned to KLM in 1945 and continued flying as a captain. Moll became the first KLM pilot to receive the title of commodore, an honorary title reflecting his extensive experience and contributions. Over the course of his career, he accumulated tens of thousands of flight hours and millions of kilometers in the air.

=== Post-retirement ===
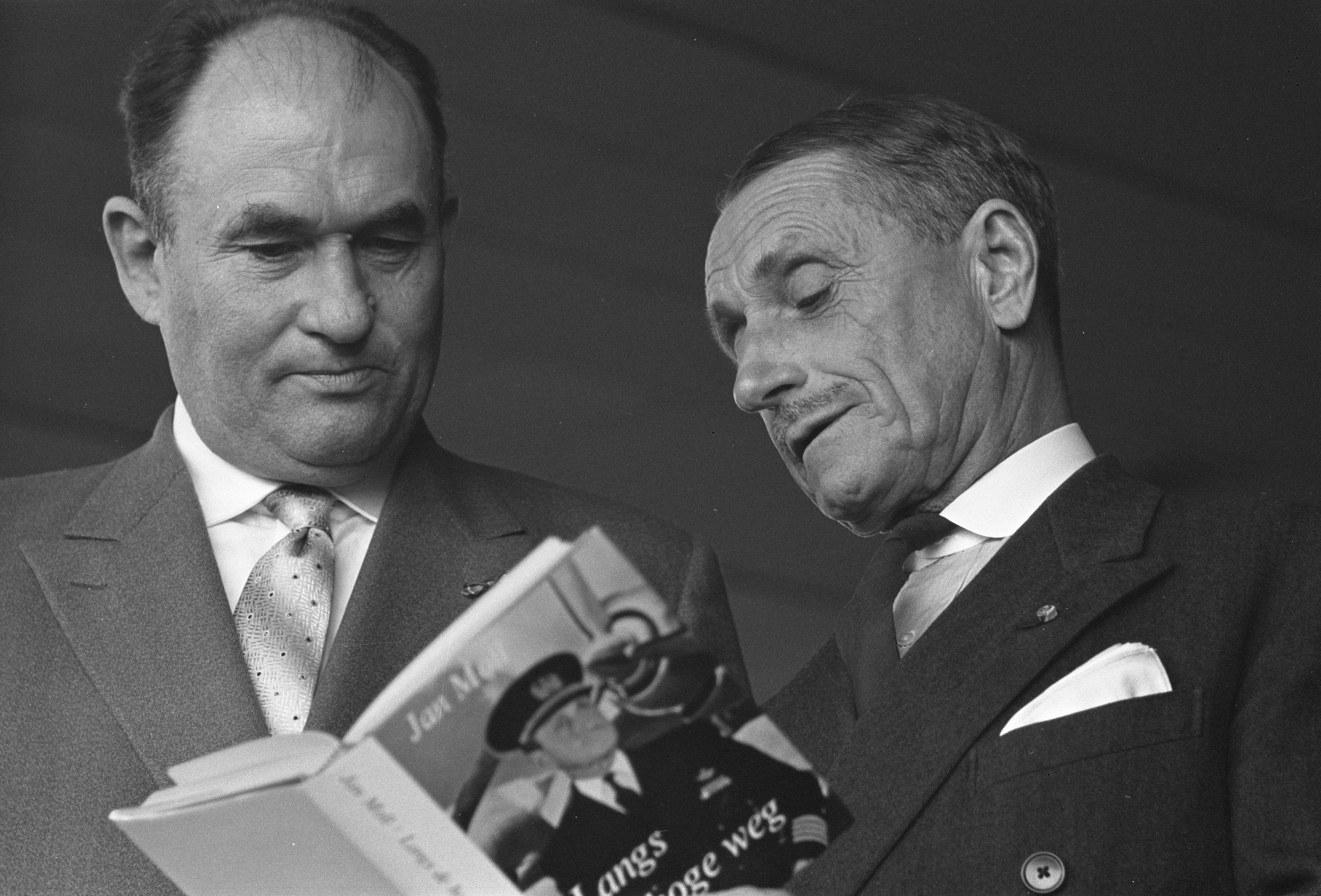
Moll at a press conference after his book publication (1959)

Moll retired from active flying in 1955 but remained associated with KLM in advisory and representative roles, carrying out special assignments for the airline.

He wrote about his career in the book Langs de hoge weg: Herinneringen uit een vliegersleven in 1959.

In later years, he was regarded as one of the last representatives of the pioneering era of aviation, reflecting on the transformation of flying from a risky endeavor into a highly organized and safe industry.

In 1972, a Fokker F27 Friendship aircraft of commuter airline and KLM subsidiary NLM CityHopper was named after him, and Moll himself performed the naming ceremony at Beek Airport.
