= Jan H. de Groot =

Dutch poet, journalist, and resistance fighter (1901–1990)

- Born: Jan Hendrik de Groot; 13 March 1901; Alkmaar, Netherlands
- Died: 1 December 1990 (aged 89); Zeist, Netherlands
- Occupations: Poet, journalist
- Writing career
- Notable works: Moederkoren, Kaleidoscopisch, Het woord als wapen en wapenbroeder

Jan Hendrik de Groot (13 March 1901 – 1 December 1990) was a Dutch poet, journalist, and resistance fighter. He was known for his Christian-inspired poetry, literary engagement with social issues, and anti-Nazi activism during World War II.

== Early life and literary debut ==
De Groot was born in Alkmaar into a culturally oriented Reformed Christian family. His literary interest was sparked during secondary school by his teacher Dr. André Schillings. He debuted in 1924 with the poem De karrekiet in the Protestant literary journal Opwaartsche Wegen, initiating a nature-lyrical phase in his poetry. His first poetry collection, Lentezon, was published in 1927.

== Professional and editorial work ==
From 1920 to 1937, he worked at the Rijkstelegrafie. He forwarded after the 1934 KLM Douglas DC-2 crash the Reuters journalists' stories from the crash location to England. These long press releases contained other information than the official readings; with possible theories about the cause of the crash which was never revealed. He later had a position at the library of the Royal Netherlands Academy of Arts and Sciences until 1948. Between 1926 and 1938, De Groot served as editorial secretary for Het Korenland, a Protestant cultural youth magazine, contributing poems, stories, and reviews.

== Literary style and themes ==
His early poetry reflected the ideals of the Jong-Protestanten movement, though he saw himself as a rebel within it. De Groot's work increasingly addressed social issues. A notable example is the sonnet De Werkloozen from the 1931 collection Vaart, portraying the plight of the unemployed.

== Resistance and wartime writings ==
A committed pacifist before the war, De Groot publicly opposed Nazism and helped Jewish refugees. During the German occupation, he and his wife joined the Dutch resistance. He contributed to the *Nieuw Geuzenliedboek* (1941), co-founded the Vrij Nederland resistance group, and was imprisoned twice. He published under the pseudonyms Haje Sikkema and J. ten Mutsaert.

His wartime poetry, such as in Om land en hart (1945), reflects his transformation and call to armed resistance. The trauma of war profoundly influenced his worldview and led to a spiritual break with his religious upbringing.

== Postwar career and recognition ==
In 1945, De Groot received the Amsterdam poetry prize for Moederkoren. He continued contributing to Protestant-Christian journals such as Ontmoeting and later Woordwerk, though his postwar work was increasingly socialist and pacifist in tone.

He worked as editor at Het Vrije Volk from 1948, later becoming press officer for the AKU in Arnhem until 1966. He was also active in the international writers’ organization PEN.

== Later years ==
De Groot remained active in literary life into old age, participating in readings and maintaining correspondence with fellow writers. He spent his final years in Park Boswijk, Doorn, where he organized literary events and continued writing poetry reflecting on aging and death.

== Selected works ==
=== Poetry collections ===
- Lentezon (1927)
- Vaart (1931)
- Om land en hart (1945)
- Moederkoren (1945)
- Bittermeren (1976)
- Kaleidoscopisch (1980)
- Silene (1987)

=== Prose and memoirs ===
- Fir (1938)
- Zeewaarts-Zuidwaarts (1940)
- Het woord als wapen en wapenbroeder (1989)
