= Jacob Kalff =

Dutch businessperson and politician

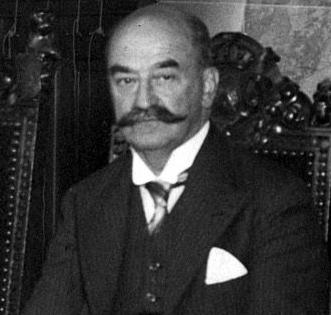
- Kalff in 1933

Minister of Water Management
- In office 26 May 1933 – 13 January 1935
- Prime Minister: Hendrikus Colijn
- Preceded by: Paul Reymer
- Succeeded by: Hendrikus Colijn

Personal details
- Born: Jacob Adriaan Kalff; 27 April 1869 Zwolle, the Netherlands
- Died: 13 January 1935 (aged 65) Wassenaar, the Netherlands
- Party: Liberal State Party
- Education: Polytechnic School
- Occupation: Politician, businessperson

Jacob Adriaan Kalff (27 April 1869 – 13 January 1935) was a Dutch businessperson and politician. He was a member of the Liberal State Party. He was director of the Nederlandse Spoorwegen and served as Minister of Transport and Water Management.

== Biography ==
=== Personal life ===
Kalff was the son of Jan Kalff (1931–1913), engineering officer and chief engineer at the railways, and Maria Judith Catharina van Hasselt. He married on 12 May 1898 to Johanna Elisabeth Hillegonda Adriana Wichers Hoeth. They had three sons and one daughter. Kallf died from a flu with pneumonia on 13 January 1935, at the age of 65.

=== Career ===
After studying at the Polytechnic School in Delft he worked at the Hollandsche IJzeren Spoorweg-Maatschappij. Kalff committed himself to the unification of the various railway organizations and became director of Rail transport companies and director of the newly formed Nederlandse Spoorwegen.

Kalff served as Minister of Transport and Water Management from May 1933 until his death in 1935.

In the cover-up report about the responsibility of the 1934 KLM Douglas DC-2 crash published nearly 50 years after the crash, stated that next to the KLM, Kalff was responsible for the crash. Kalff was blamed he had given out a certificate of airworthiness for the Uiver aircraft with fewer demands than desired due to the "major interests of KLM" and he should not have issued a passenger permit. The six demands requested by the Kalff in return for giving out the certificate were not implemented by KLM.

Political offices
Preceded by Paul Reymer	Minister of Water Management; 1933–1935	Succeeded by Hendrikus Colijn
