= Cornelis Benjamin Biezeno =

Dutch applied mathematician and scientist

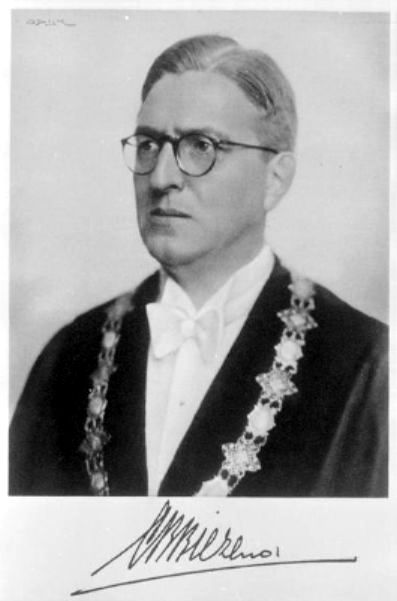
C.B. Biezeno

Cornelis Benjamin Biezeno (2 March 1888 in Delft – 5 September 1975 in Wageningen) was a Dutch applied mathematician and scientist in engineering mechanics. He was a professor at TU Delft.

== Biography ==
Biezeno studied mechanical engineering from 1904 to 1909 (graduating cum laude) at TU Delft. Subsequently, he was a lecturer, first for mechanical engineering and then for mathematics at Delft. In 1914, he became a professor of mechanics at Delft. From 1937 to 1938 and from 1949 to 1951 he was rector magnificus at TU Delft.

His book Technische Dynamik, written with Richard Grammel, was a standard reference in its era. Biezeno was one of the organizers of the first Internationalen Congress of Applied Mechanics held at Delft in 1924.

His doctoral students include Warner T. Koiter and Adriaan van Wijngaarden. Biezeno was given honorary doctorates by the University of Ghent, the University of Amsterdam, and the Free University of Brussels. In 1939 he was elected a member of the Royal Netherlands Academy of Arts and Sciences. In 1960 he received the Timoshenko Medal with Richard Grammel.

== Works ==
- with Richard Grammel: Technische Dynamik, Springer Verlag 1939, 2nd edition in two volumes 1953
- with Grammel: Engineering Dynamics, 4 vols., Glasgow: Blackie, 1955, 1956
- Editor with Johannes Martinus Burgers: Proceedings of the first congress of applied mechanics, Delft 1924, Delft, Waltman 1925
