= Cornelis de Langen =

Dutch physician

Cornelis Douwe de Langen (10 September 1887 in Groningen – 12 April 1967 in Zeist) was a Dutch physician. He spent a substantial part of his career in Java, Indonesia where he did extensive work on tropical medicine and observed an association between dietary cholesterol intake and incidence of gallstones, arteriosclerosis and other "Western diseases".

== Personal life and career ==
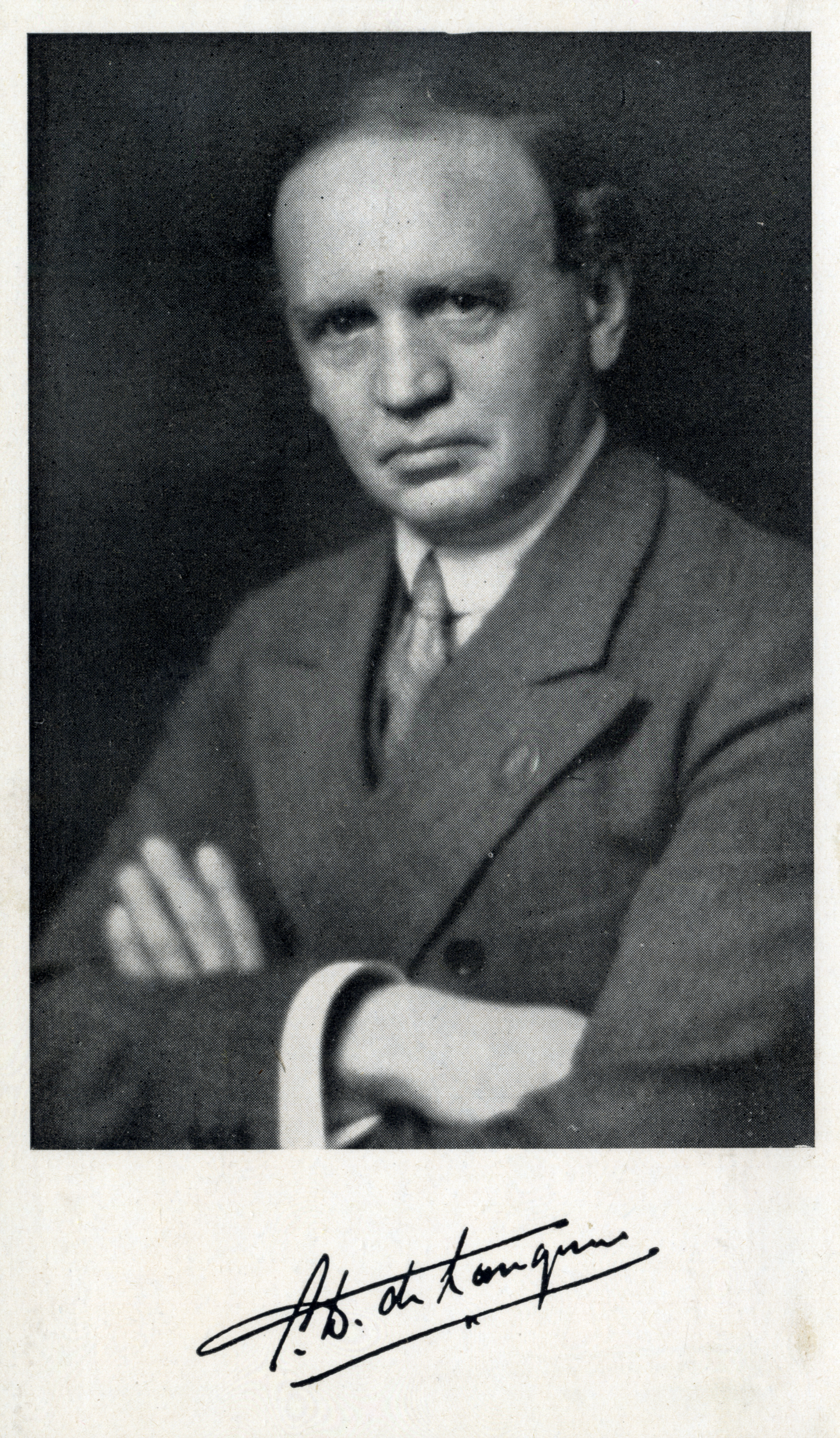
Portrait of prof. Cornelis Douwe de Langen, born Groningen 10 December 1887, professor of internal medicine at the Utrecht University (1938-1953), chairman of the Medical Faculty, internist at the National Aviation Medical Center in Soesterberg, died Soesterberg, 12 April 1967. Collection of Het Utrechts Archief [105483].

Cornelis de Langen was born in 1887 Groningen 10 December 1887 to Hendrik and Jantje (né Wolters) de Langen; his father was a dyer in Groningen. De Langen had two brothers and three sisters. He graduated in Medicine in January 1912 and became an assistant to Abraham Albert Hljmans Van Den Bergh. On August 26, 1913 he married Anna Wartena in Groningen. In 1914 he was Chef de Clinique in Internal Medicine at Groningen University, when the Netherlands government assigned him to help combat epidemic plague in Indonesia (then known as the Dutch East Indies). When he arrived he was put in charge of teaching internal medicine to the local medical trainees at the School Tot Opleiding Van Inlandsche Artsen (STOVIA; School to train indigenous doctors) in Jakarta (then called Batavia) . His key scientific and medical contributions were made while he was in Java. In addition to his work on cholesterol, for which he is now best known, he worked on leprosy, beri beri, tuberculosis and cancer. He was co-founder and chairman of the Groene Kruis in Batavia. From 1921 to 1933 he visited several countries, including South and North America, Japan, Egypt, China and South Africa on behalf of the Netherlands government and the League of Nations. He was also a member of several League of Nations Committees, among others committees on malaria, leprosy and medical higher education. In 1935 De Langen returned to the Netherlands to become head of the laboratory of the Willem-Arntz Foundation and a physician at Utrecht in the department of Internal Medicine headed by his old mentor, Van Den Bergh. In 1938, when Van Den Bergh retired, de Langen became Professor of Internal Medicine and Chairman of the Medical Faculty at Utrecht. After the war he was appointed rector of the Emergency University of Dutch East Indies (Nood-Universiteit van Nederlandsch Indie) which was formed after the liberation from the Japanese in 1946. He served in that role between 20 June 1946 and 12 March 1947 and then briefly acted as rector of the University of Indonesia between its formation in March 1947 and 6 August 1947. In 1953 he retired as Professor of Internal Medicine at Utrecht, but took on the role of Internsit at the National Aviation Medical Center in Soesterberg until he retired from that post in 1958. He continued to write after his retirement and died in Soesterberg, Zeist, on 12 April 1967.

== Scientific and medical contribution ==
=== Correlation between diet and diseases ===
De Langen's main contribution is the discovery of the association between a diet low in cholesterol, fat and meat and very low incidence of gallstones, cardiovascular disease. He wrote:

“The question has frequently been asked whether cholesterol concentration of blood and bile is controlled by diet—the diet of the population in the Dutch East Indies differs very much from the Western European diet. The local diet is mainly vegetarian with rice as the staple, that is very poor in cholesterol and other lipids.” (quoted in)

In his report to the second Conference of the International Society of Geographic Pathology in 1934 he noted that only 1 case of angina pectoris had been observed among Javanese patients admitted to the 500 bed Municipal Hospital in Batavia in five years. In his textbook, Clinical textbook of tropical medicine, he stated that:

“The food of the masses which visit our hospitals and polyclinics in Java contains but little cholesterin; the result is a smaller content of cholesterin in the blood. Especially in the very numerous patients with malaria and ancylostomiasis, the cholesterin content is quite often on the very low side. Whenever, in hospitals or elsewhere, we give people a diet rich in lipoids, the quantity of cholesterin in their blood rises at once.” (quoted in).

He subsequently showed by experiment that changing the typical Indonesian rice-based diet to one high in meat, butter, and eggs for 6-weeks increased Indonesians' blood cholesterol. De Langen also observed that Javanese ship stewards living in the Netherlands had high blood cholesterol levels that were similar to the Dutch, and unlike Javanese in Indonesia.

De Langen published his results only in Dutch, so his work remained largely unknown to most of the international scientific community at the time.

== Awards and memberships ==
- Honorary doctorate, Utrecht University (1927).
- Corresponding member (1929 - 1935) and Ordinary member (1950) of the Royal Netherlands Academy of Arts and Sciences.
- Honorary appointments to the Institute of Tropical Medicine, Antwerp, the Taihoku Imperial University and the New Orleans University.
- Knight in the Order of the Netherlands Lion
- Officer in the Order of Orange Nassau
- Officer in the Legion of Honor
- Commander in the Order of the Crown of Thailand
- Commander in the Order of China
- Commander of the Royal Order of Cambodia.

== Selected publications ==
- C. D. de Langen, Cholesterol metabolism and racial pathology [article in Dutch]. Geneeskundig Tijdschrift Nederlandsch-Indië. 1916; 56: 1–34.
- C. D. de Langen, Clinical arteriosclerosis in Java. Mededeelingen Dienst Volksgezondheid Nederlandsch-Indie. 1935; 24: 1–8
- C. D. de Langen and A. Lichtenstein. A Clinical Textbook of Tropical Medicine. G. Kolff, Amsterdam, the Netherlands (1936)
- C. D. de Langen, Medical Training in the Indies. A brief history. Bulletin of the Colonial Institute of Amsterdam, Vol.1, No.2, 1938. (1938)
- C. D. de Langen, De bloedsomloop en zijn afhankelijkheid van ons omringende invloeden. (1941)
- A. A. Hijmans Van Den Bergh, C. D. de Langen, I. Snapper, C. L. C. van Nieuwenhuizen. Leerboek der inwendige geneeskunde, Scheltema & Holkema, Amsterdam (1946)
- C. D. De Langen, The peripheral circulation of blood, lymph and tissular fluid. F. Bohn, Haarlem (1968)
