= Uiver =

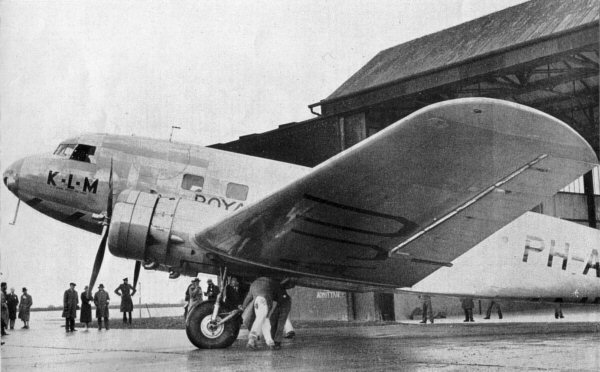
- KLM Douglas DC-2 PH-AJU Uiver

General information
- Type: Douglas DC-2
- Manufacturer: Douglas Aircraft Company
- Status: Crashed near Rutbah Wells, Iraq.
- Primary user: KLM Royal Dutch Airlines
- Number built: 2 (original + replica)
- Registration: PH-AJU

History
- Introduction date: 1934
- First flight: 19 September 1934 (in the Netherlands)
- Retired: 20 December 1934 (destroyed)

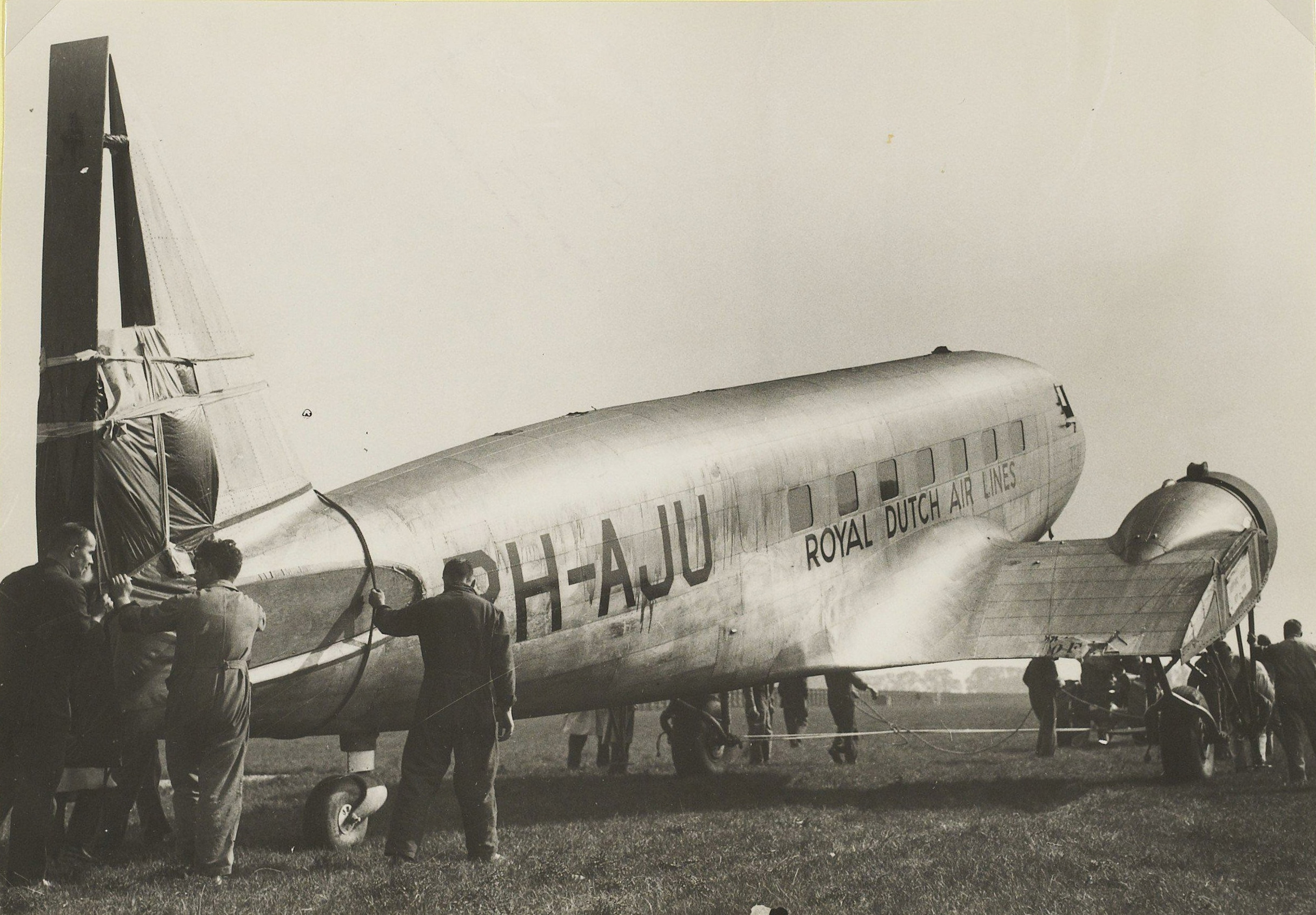
PH-AJU, without wings, upon delivery at Waalhaven Airport, 13 September 1934.

Uiver was the name of the Douglas DC-2 airliner with registration PH-AJU operated by Dutch airline KLM. This innovative aluminum aircraft became famous in 1934, both in the Netherlands and internationally, for winning the handicap division of the London to Melbourne MacRobertson Air Race.

Later that year, the plane crashed on a special mail flight from the Netherlands to Batavia, killing all seven on board. A report blaming KLM director Albert Plesman and minister Jacob Kalff was reportedly suppressed in what became known as an "Doofpotaffaire" (cover-up affair).

== Name ==
KLM named its aircraft after birds corresponding to the last letter of the registration. For example, PH-AIP was Pelikaan (Pelican), and PH-AJA was Arend (Eagle). However, PH-AJU posed a problem—there were no bird names in standard Dutch beginning with "U" that hadn’t already been used. Someone then suggested "Uiver", the Betuwe dialect word for stork.

== Delivery and First Flight ==
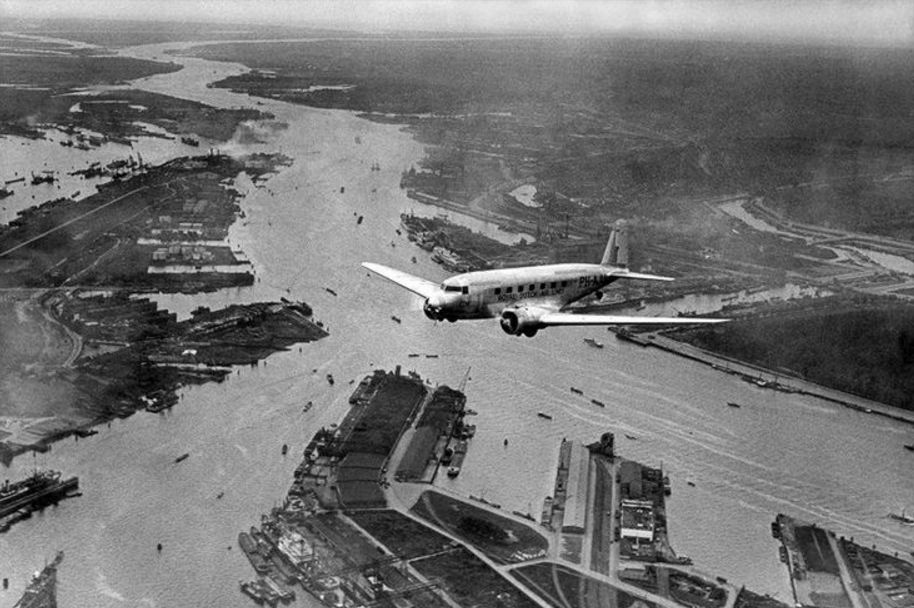
First flight over Rotterdam harbour, 19 September 1934

The first DC-2 ordered by KLM on 28 March 1934 was the Uiver. It was a DC-2-115A, the 18th DC-2 built by Douglas Aircraft Company in Santa Monica, California. After acceptance, the aircraft was flown by KLM Captain Koene Dirk Parmentier to New York on 22 August 1934, where it was partly disassembled and shipped aboard the S.S. Statendam to Rotterdam. On 13 September, the aircraft arrived in the Netherlands and was reassembled at Waalhaven Airport. Its first Dutch flight was on 19 September 1934, and it was christened "Uiver" on 28 September.

Its all-metal aluminum construction marked a technological leap, replacing the then-common wooden, linen-covered airframes. Impressed, KLM promptly ordered 14 more DC-2s, to be assembled by Fokker.

== Melbourne Race ==
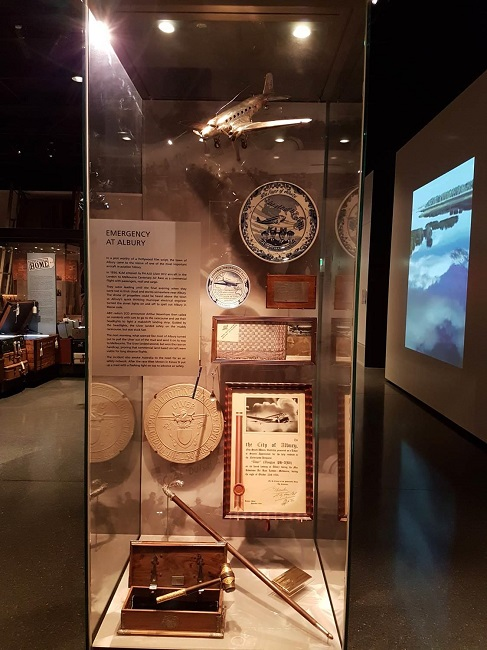
Uiver memorabilia at Albury

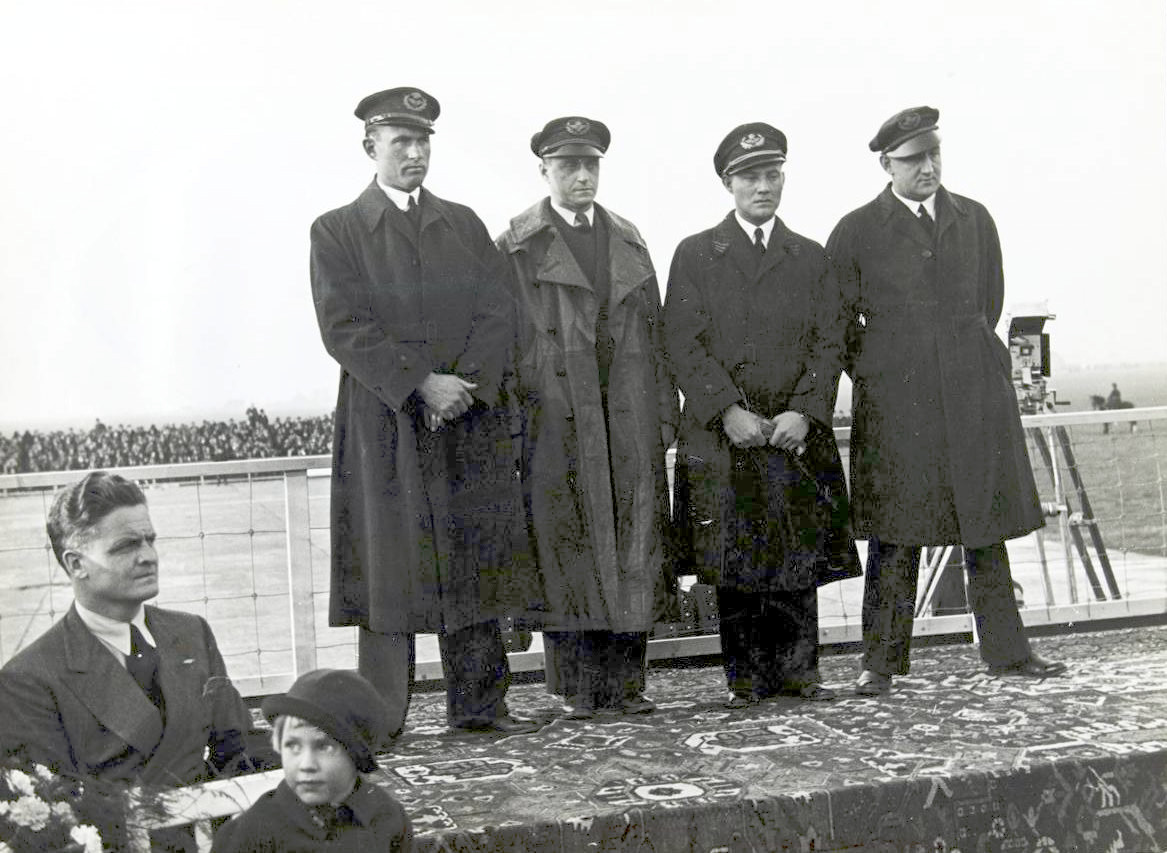
Celebration at Waalhaven, 30 November 1934

The Uiver gained international fame in the 1934 MacRobertson Air Race from Mildenhall (UK) to Melbourne (Australia), held from 20 to 24 October 1934. The crew comprised:

- Captain Koene Dirk Parmentier
- First Officer Jan Moll
- Flight engineer Bouwe Prins
- Radio Telegraphist Cornelis van Brugge

Three passengers were aboard: Pieter Gilissen, Roelof Domenie, and German pilot-journalist Thea Rasche.

=== Race ===
During the 1934 race, on the last leg from Charleville, Queensland to Melbourne, Victoria the Uiver became lost in a huge storm and, at 1:20 am on the 24th of October, made a forced landing on the inner field of the racecourse (there being no airfield) at Albury, New South Wales. The ground was saturated from heavy rain and illuminated only by car headlights. Captain Parmentier was able to land the DC-2 safely although the Uiver was deeply bogged. The following morning Albury's townsfolk pulled the Uiver from the muddy ground and the aircraft, stripped of all excess weight, with only Parmentier and Mol aboard, was able to take off and finish the race in Melbourne.

The Uiver won the handicap division, completing the 19,877 km in a total travel time of 90 hours, 17 minutes. The actual flight time was 71 hours, 29 minutes but 18 hours, 48 minutes was lost in delays on the ground, including the emergency landing at Albury. In the overall ranking, it placed second on time behind C.W.A. Scott and Tom Campbell Black in their red de Havilland DH.88 Comet Grosvenor House (71 hours). After the race, a wave of national enthusiasm followed in the Netherlands. Songs, commemorative items, and even a rose named Aviator Parmentier were created in the plane’s honor.

== Fate ==
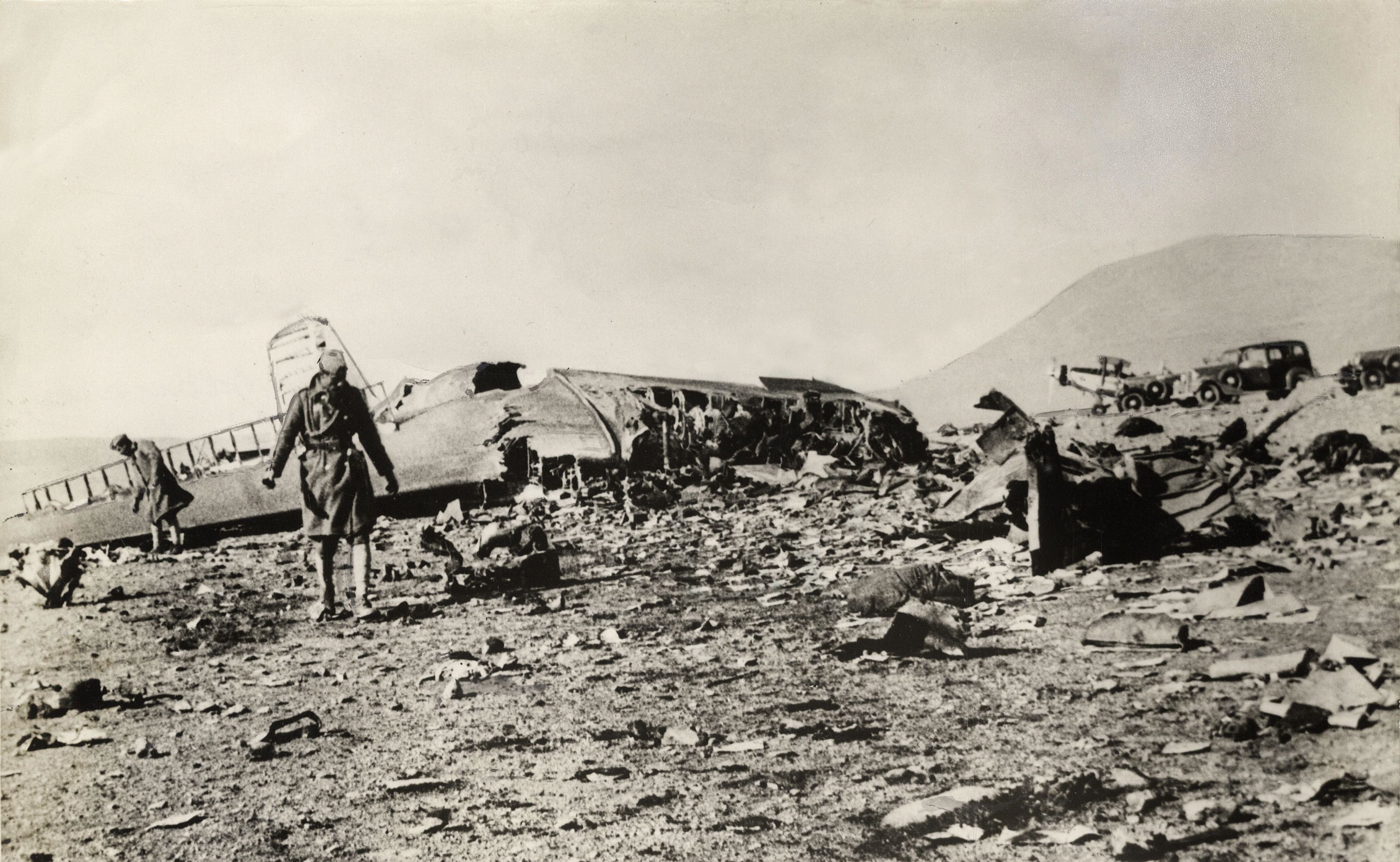
Wreckage of the Uiver

On 20 December 1934, the Uiver departed from Schiphol for Batavia (Dutch East Indies) with 350 kg of Christmas mail. Captain Willem Beekman initially refused to depart from Cairo due to bad weather, but KLM director Plesman allegedly threatened dismissal if the flight was delayed.

The Uiver crashed near Rutbah in Iraq. All seven onboard were killed:

- Crew: Captain Willem Beekman, first officer Jan van Steenbergen, flight engineer Hendrik Waalewijn, radio telegraphist Gysbert van Zadelhoff
- Passengers: newspaper magnate Dominique Willem Berretty, medical professor Eduard Willem Walch and businessman Jacobus Thymen Kort.

The Uiver had flown for just three months. Fourteen more DC-2s had been ordered, but five were lost in crashes within three years, prompting public concern.

== The Second Uiver ==
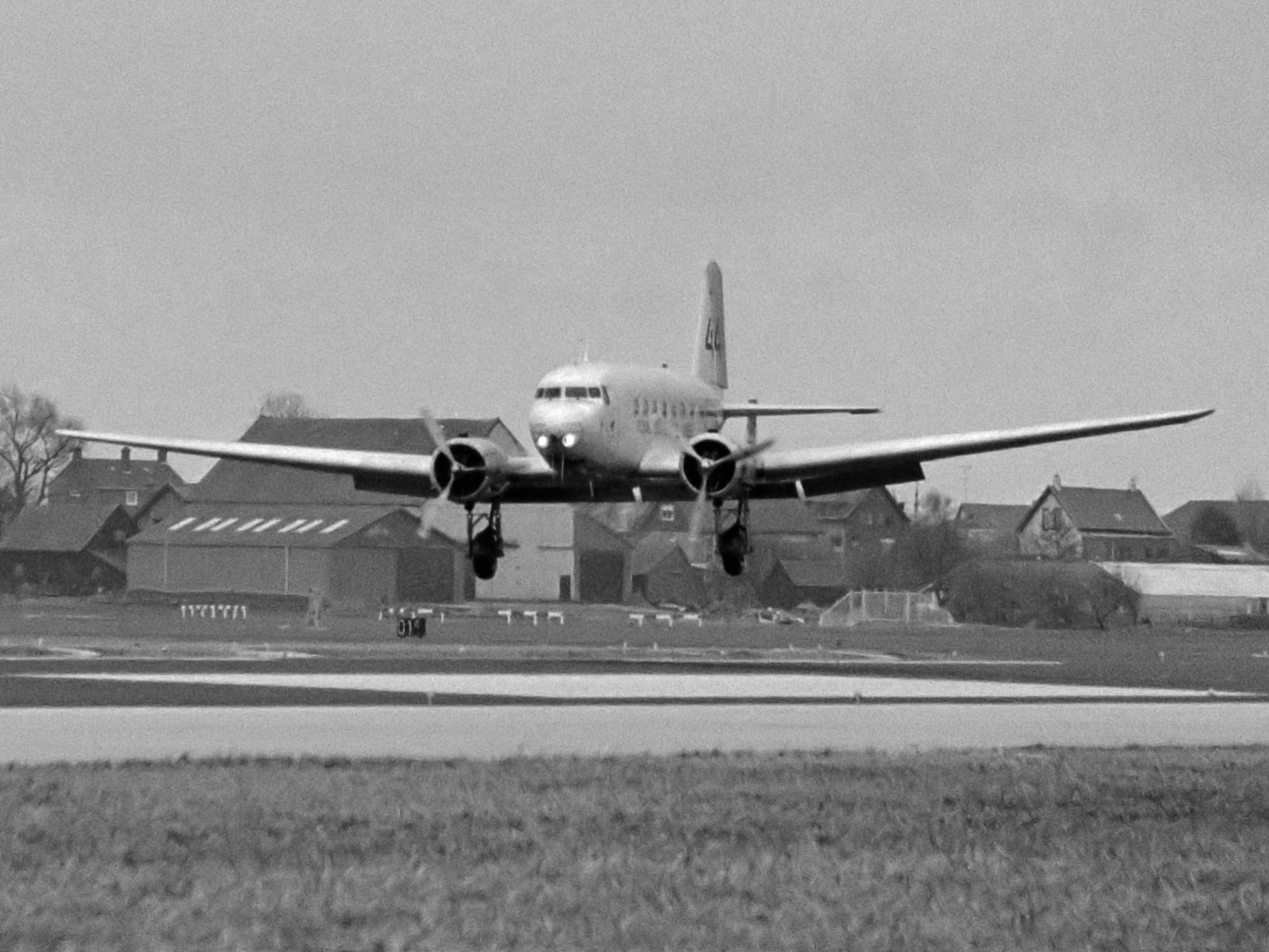
The replica Uiver returns to Schiphol, 31 March 1984

In 1983, a US-built DC-2 was shipped to the Netherlands in preparation for a television documentary being made by the NOS (Netherlands Broadcasting Corporation). It reenacted the Melbourne flight, landing at all of the stops made by the original Uiver, from 18 December 1983 to 5 February 1984. For this memorial flight the original registration PH-AJU and race number (44) were applied. It returned on 31 March 1984.

Crew included:

- Captain Jan Plesman (grandson of Albert Plesman)
- First Officer Fred Schouten
- Engineers Bonne Pijpstra and Ton Degenaars

The aircraft was returned to owner Colgate W. Darden III. In 1999, it was bought through crowdfunding and restored with original Uiver colors and registration PH-AJU. It is displayed at the Aviodrome in Lelystad Airport.

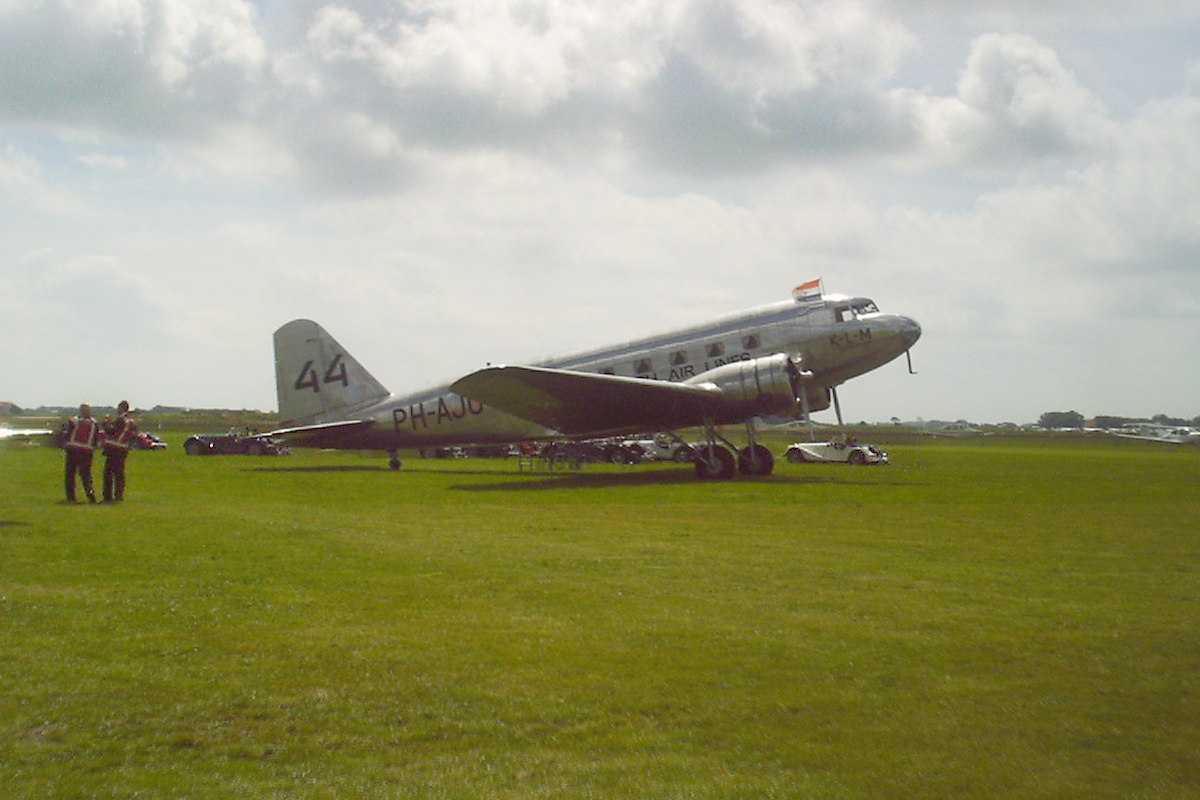
DC-2 in Uiver livery at Texel Airshow, 2007

It was grounded in 2005 due to gear failure but repaired by volunteers and flew again in 2007.
