= Allerton, Bronx =

Neighborhood in New York City

Allerton
- Neighborhood of the Bronx
- Etymology: Named after Daniel Allerton, an early settler.
- Interactive map of Allerton
- Coordinates: 40.866°N 73.851°W
- Country: United States
- State: New York
- City: New York City
- Borough: The Bronx
- Community District: The Bronx 11

Economics

Ethnicity
- ZIP Codes: 10467
- Area code: 718, 347, 929, and 917
- Website: www.allerton.nyc www.laconia.nyc

Allerton is a neighborhood geographically located in the East Bronx section of the Bronx, New York City. It is named in honor of Daniel Allerton, an early Bronx settler who purchased and farmed this area with his wife Hustace. It consists of two subsections called Bronxwood and Laconia. Its boundaries, starting from the north and moving clockwise, are Adee Avenue, Boston Road, and Gun Hill Road to the northeast; the IRT Dyre Avenue Line (5 train) to the east; Waring Avenue to the south; and Bronx River Parkway to the west. White Plains Road and Boston Road are the primary thoroughfares through Allerton.

The neighborhood is part of Bronx Community Board 11, and its ZIP Code is 10467. The area is patrolled by the NYPD's 49th Precinct. The local subway is the IRT White Plains Road Line, served by the 2 and 5 trains.

== History ==
Allerton Avenue was ethnically divided in the 1950s through the 1980s by a distinct separation of Jewish and Italian residents. Primarily a commercial avenue west of Laconia Avenue, the geographic boundary between the Jewish and Italians was Bronxwood Avenue and Boston Post Road. Bordering the largely Jewish Pelham Parkway to the southern extreme of Williamsbridge, the area east of Boston Post Road was predominantly post-war immigrant Italian and to the west an older Jewish community. Mixed in were residents representing earlier 19th and 20th century migrations from Manhattan, largely of Irish and English-Irish extraction. The arrival of West Indians in the 1980s marked the transition, north of Allerton Avenue, from a distinctly Italian area to a West Indian one. West of Bronxwood Avenue, the arrival of Dominicans concurrently marked the end of the Jewish community north of Allerton Avenue (Laconia). Today, the area south of Allerton Avenue and east of Bronxwood Avenue has a large population of Italian-Americans and Albanian-Americans, as well as Asians, Hispanics, West-Indians, and other groups.

Throughout its history, the area called Allerton has also been known by various names. The New York City Department of City Planning had classified the southern part of the neighborhood as "Laconia" and the northern part as "Bronxdale", while Google Maps called the area "Bronxwood" (a historical name also used for a nearby street) and Hagstrom Map called the area "Allerton". However, neighborhood names and boundaries in New York City are not official, and the names of the Allerton area are highly disputed.

== Demographics ==
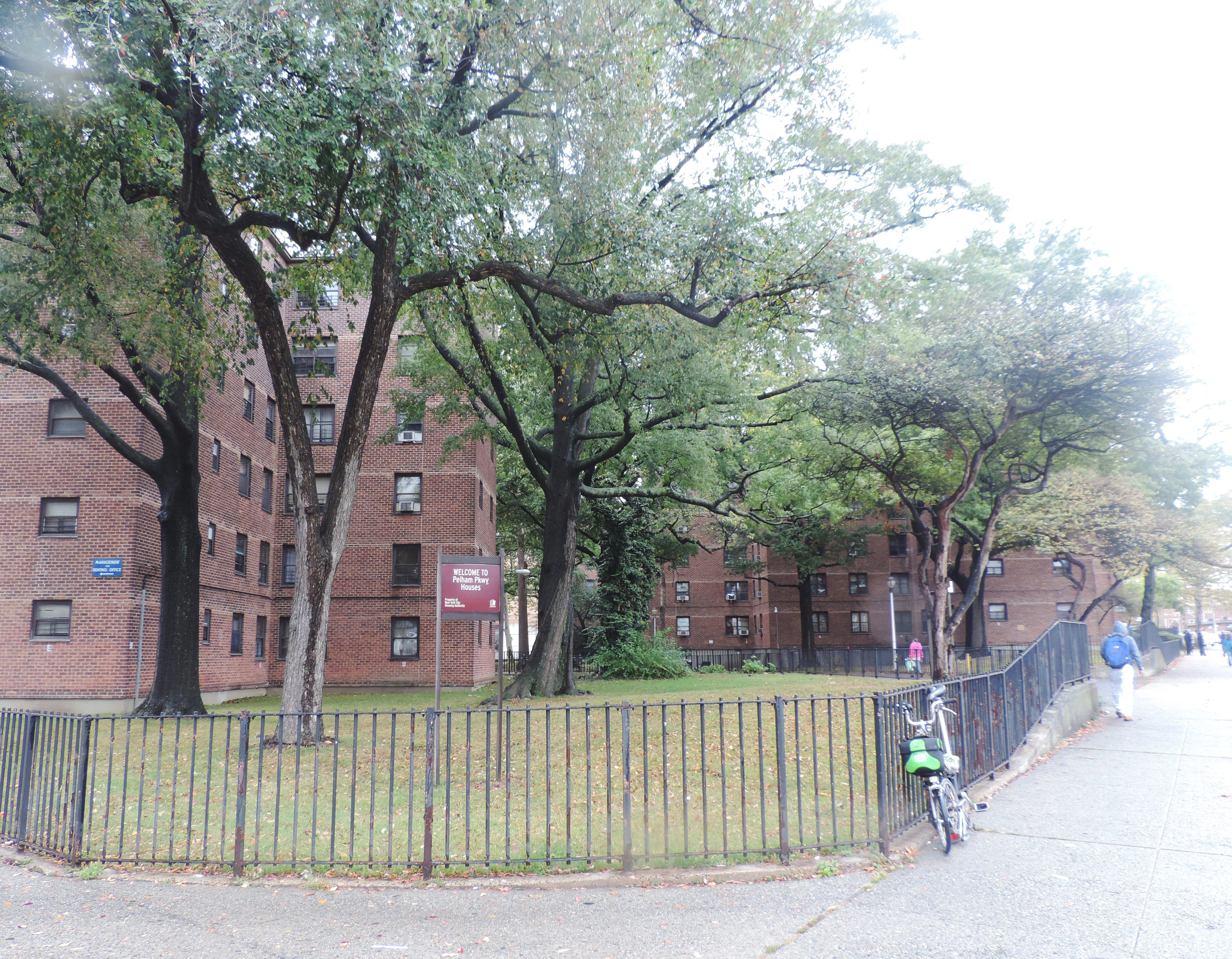
Pelham Parkway Houses

Based on data from the 2010 United States census, the population of the combined Allerton-Pelham Gardens neighborhood was 28,903, an increase of 393 (1.4%) from the 28,510 counted in 2000. Covering an area of 726.98 acres (294.20 ha), the neighborhood had a population density of 39.8 inhabitants per acre (25,500/sq mi; 9,800/km^{2}). The racial makeup of the Allerton-Pelham Gardens neighborhood was 25.3% (7,316) White, 32.5% (9,391) African American, 0.2% (55) Native American, 7.9% (2,282) Asian, 0.0% (12) Pacific Islander, 0.9% (252) from other races, and 1.4% (412) from two or more races. Hispanic or Latino of any race were 31.8% (9,183) of the population.

The neighborhood is predominantly Hispanic south of Allerton Avenue (Bronxwood) and Black north of Allerton Avenue (Laconia). A smaller longstanding Italian and immigrant Albanian population exist east of White Plains Road primarily in Bronxwood near Esplanade Avenue. The majority of residents rent. Under 20% of the population lives below the poverty line in Bronxwood while over 20% of the population lives below the poverty line in Laconia.

The entirety of Community District 11, which comprises Pelham Parkway, Allerton, and Morris Park, had 116,180 inhabitants as of NYC Health's 2018 Community Health Profile, with an average life expectancy of 79.9 years. This is lower than the median life expectancy of 81.2 for all New York City neighborhoods. Most inhabitants are youth and middle-aged adults: 22% are between the ages of between 0–17, 30% between 25–44, and 24% between 45–64. The ratio of college-aged and elderly residents was lower, at 9% and 14% respectively.

As of 2017, the median household income in Community District 11 was $48,018. In 2018, an estimated 21% of Allerton and Morris Park residents lived in poverty, compared to 25% in all of the Bronx and 20% in all of New York City. One in eight residents (12%) were unemployed, compared to 13% in the Bronx and 9% in New York City. Rent burden, or the percentage of residents who have difficulty paying their rent, is 55% in Allerton and Morris Park, compared to the boroughwide and citywide rates of 58% and 51% respectively. Based on this calculation, as of 2018, Allerton and Morris Park are considered high-income relative to the rest of the city and not gentrifying.

== Land use and terrain ==
Allerton is dominated by multi-unit homes of various types. There are also some tenements scattered across the neighborhood, primarily within five blocks of the El on White Plains Road. The total land area is roughly two square miles. The area is low and flat.

=== Subsections ===
- Bronxwood is the southern part of Allerton. It has a population over 20,000. Its boundaries, starting from the north and moving clockwise are Allerton Avenue to the north, Esplanade Avenue to the east, Pelham Parkway to the south, and the Bronx River Parkway to the west. Bronxwood includes the Pelham Parkway Houses and Boston Road Plaza.
- Laconia is the northern part of Allerton. It has a population under 25,000. Its boundaries, starting from the north and moving clockwise are Boston Road to the northwest, East Gun Hill Road to the northeast, the IRT Dyre Avenue Line to the east, Allerton Avenue to the south, and Bronxwood Avenue to the west. Laconia includes the Eastchester Houses.
- Olinville is the northwestern part of Allerton; the section north of Adee Avenue is also considered part of Williamsbridge. Residences include the Parkside Housing Projects. Its boundaries, starting from the north and moving clockwise are Gun Hill Road to the north, Boston Road to the east, Allerton Avenue to the south, and the Bronx River Parkway to the west.

=== Public housing ===
Four NYCHA developments are located in Allerton.

1. Boston Road Plaza; one 20-story building
2. Eastchester Gardens; ten buildings, 7 and 8 stories tall
3. Parkside Houses; 14 buildings, 6, 7, 14 and 15 stories tall
4. Pelham Parkway Houses; twenty-three 6-story buildings

== Police and crime ==
Allerton and Morris Park are patrolled by the 49th Precinct of the NYPD, located at 2121 Eastchester Road. The 49th Precinct ranked 43rd safest out of 69 patrol areas for per-capita crime in 2010. As of 2018, with a non-fatal assault rate of 64 per 100,000 people, Allerton and Morris Park's rate of violent crimes per capita is slightly more than that of the city as a whole. The incarceration rate of 372 per 100,000 people is lower than that of the city as a whole.

The 49th Precinct has a lower crime rate than in the 1990s, with crimes across all categories having decreased by 71.7% between 1990 and 2022. The precinct reported 7 murders, 17 rapes, 273 robberies, 367 felony assaults, 133 burglaries, 611 grand larcenies, and 371 grand larcenies auto in 2022.

== Fire safety ==
Allerton is served by the New York City Fire Department (FDNY)'s Engine Co. 62/Ladder Co. 32 fire station at 3431 White Plains Road.

== Health ==
As of 2018, preterm births and births to teenage mothers are slightly more common in Allerton and Morris Park than in other places citywide. In Allerton and Morris Park, there were 90 preterm births per 1,000 live births (compared to 87 per 1,000 citywide), and 19.7 births to teenage mothers per 1,000 live births (compared to 19.3 per 1,000 citywide). Allerton and Morris Park has a low population of residents who are uninsured. In 2018, this population of uninsured residents was estimated to be 12%, the same as the citywide rate of 12%.

The concentration of fine particulate matter, the deadliest type of air pollutant, in Allerton and Morris Park is 0.0074 milligrams per cubic metre (7.4×10^{−9} oz/ft^{3}), less than the city average. Fifteen percent of Allerton and Morris Park residents are smokers, which is slightly higher than the city average of 14% of residents being smokers. In Allerton and Morris Park, 32% of residents are obese, 14% are diabetic, and 31% have high blood pressure—compared to the citywide averages of 24%, 11%, and 28% respectively. In addition, 23% of children are obese, compared to the citywide average of 20%.

Eighty-three percent of residents eat some fruits and vegetables every day, which is lower than the city's average of 87%. In 2018, 80% of residents described their health as "good", "very good", or "excellent", slightly higher than the city's average of 78%. For every supermarket in Allerton and Morris Park, there are 17 bodegas.

The nearest large hospitals are Calvary Hospital, Montefiore Medical Center's Jack D. Weiler Hospital, and NYC Health + Hospitals/Jacobi in Morris Park. The Albert Einstein College of Medicine campus is also located in Morris Park.

== Post offices and ZIP Codes ==
Allerton is located within two ZIP Codes. The neighborhood is located in 10467 west of Bronxwood Avenue and 10469 east of Bronxwood Avenue. The United States Postal Service operates two post offices nearby: Parkway Station at 2100 White Plains Road and Esplanade Station at 2488 Williamsbridge Road.

== Education ==
Allerton and Morris Park generally have a lower rate of college-educated residents than the rest of the city as of 2018. While 32% of residents age 25 and older have a college education or higher, 24% have less than a high school education and 44% are high school graduates or have some college education. By contrast, 26% of Bronx residents and 43% of city residents have a college education or higher. The percentage of Allerton and Morris Park students excelling in math rose from 32% in 2000 to 48% in 2011, though reading achievement remained constant at 37% during the same time period.

Allerton and Morris Park's rate of elementary school student absenteeism is slightly higher than the rest of New York City. In Allerton and Morris Park, 23% of elementary school students missed twenty or more days per school year, a little more than the citywide average of 20%. Additionally, 74% of high school students in Allerton and Morris Park graduate on time, about the same as the citywide average of 75%.

=== Schools ===
The New York City Department of Education operates the following public schools in Allerton:

- PS 41: Gun Hill Road (grades K-5), Olinville Av. and Rosewood St.
- PS 76: Bennington (grades K-5), Adee and Bronxwood Aves.
- PS 89: Williamsbridge Middle School (grades K-5), Mace Ave. and Williamsbridge Road
- PS 96: Richard Rodgers (grades K-5), Waring and Barker Aves.
- PS 105: Abraham Bernstein (grades K-5), Brady Avenue
- IS 326: Bronx Green Middle School (grades 6-8), Mace and Wallace Aves.
- IS 468: Pelham Academy of Academics and Community Engagement (grades 6-8), Mace and Wallace Aves.
- Christopher Columbus High School, 920 Astor Ave.
- PS 121: Throop elementary school| (grades k-5), Allerton Ave and Throop Ave.
- PS 144: Michaelangelo Middle School| (grades 5-8), Gunther Ave between Gun hill Rd and Allerton Ave

=== Libraries ===
The New York Public Library (NYPL) operates two branches nearby. The Allerton branch is located at 2740 Barnes Avenue. It opened in 1959 under a design by Hertz and Salerni and was renovated in 2015. The Eastchester branch is located at 1385 East Gun Hill Road. It has operated since 1950 and moved to its current one-story, 7,500-square-foot (700 m^{2}) location in 1985.

== Transportation ==
The following New York City Subway stations serve Allerton:

- Gun Hill Road/White Plains Road (2 and 5 trains)
- Gun Hill Road/Seymour Avenue (5 train)
- Burke Avenue (2 and 5 trains)
- Allerton Avenue (2 and 5 trains)
- Pelham Parkway (2 and 5 trains)

The following MTA Regional Bus Operations bus routes serve Allerton:

- Bx8: to 225th Street station (2 and 5 trains) or Locust Point (via Williamsbridge Road)
- Bx12: to University Heights or Pelham Bay Park station (6 train) (via Fordham Road – Pelham Parkway)
- Bx12 SBS: to Bay Plaza Shopping Center or 207th Street station (A train) (via Fordham Road – Pelham Parkway)
- Bx25 and Bx26: to Lehman College or Co-op City (via Allerton Avenue)
- Bx28 and Bx38: to Co-op City or Fordham Center (via Gun Hill Road)
- Bx30: to Pelham Parkway station (2 and 5 trains) or Co-op City (via Boston Road)
- Bx39: to 241st Street station (2 train) or Clason's Point (via White Plains Road)

Allerton is also served by the following Bee-Line Bus System routes, which run to Westchester County:

- Bee-Line 60: to White Plains
- Bee-Line 61: to Port Chester
- Bee-Line 62 Limited: to White Plains
