= 233rd Street station =

New York City Subway station in the Bronx

233 Street
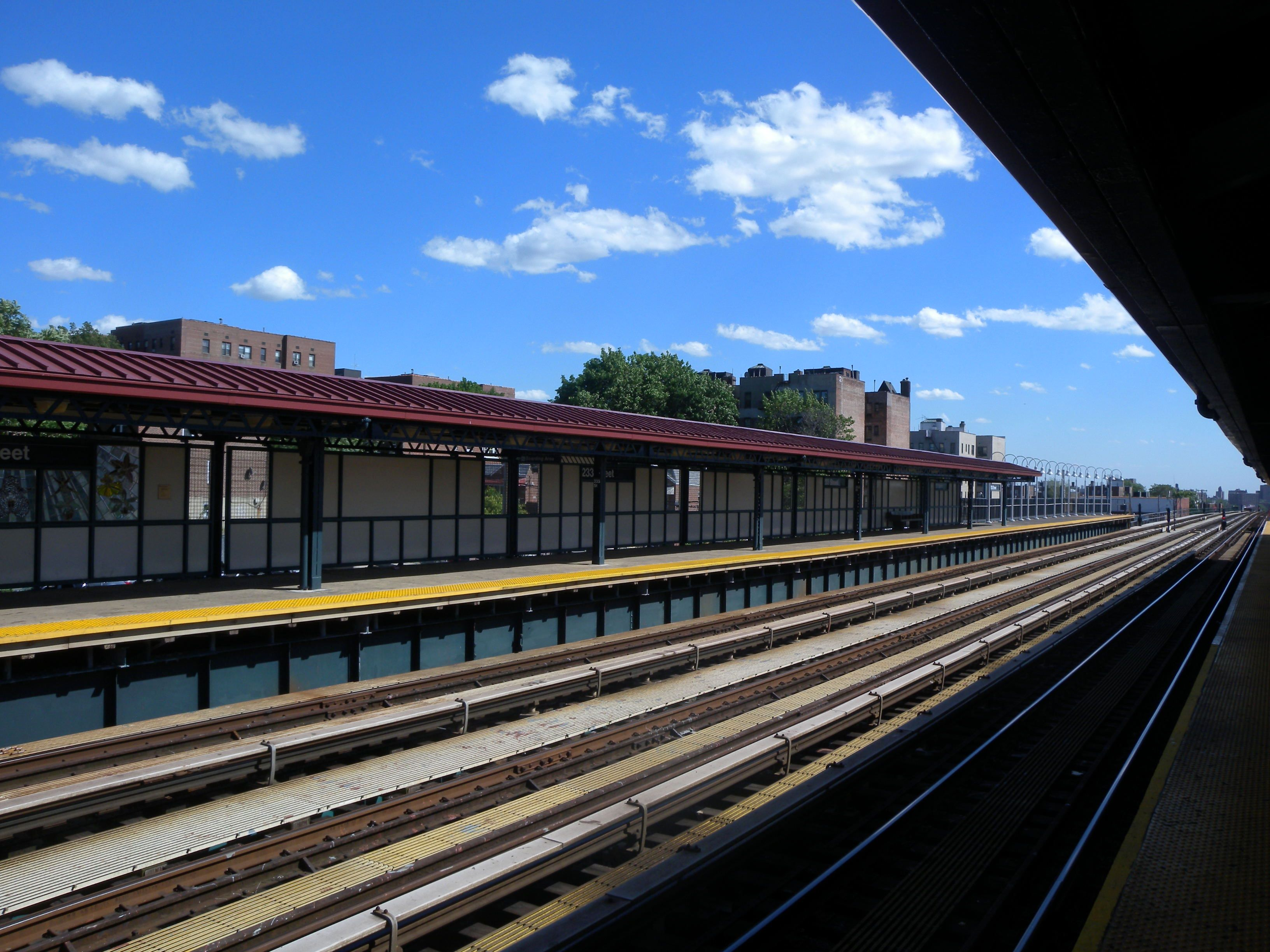
- Northbound platform

Station statistics
- Address: East 233rd Street & White Plains Road; Bronx, New York
- Borough: The Bronx
- Locale: Wakefield
- Coordinates: 40.893°N 73.857°W
- Division: A (IRT)
- Line: IRT White Plains Road Line
- Services: 2 (all times); 5 (limited weekday rush hour service in the peak direction)
- Transit: NYCT Bus: Bx31, Bx39; MTA Bus: BxM11; Bee-Line Bus: 42; Metro-North: Harlem Line (at Woodlawn)
- Structure: Elevated
- Platforms: 2 side platforms
- Tracks: 3 (2 in regular service)

Other information
- Opened: March 31, 1917; 109 years ago
- Accessible: Yes

Traffic
- 2025: 788,978 ▲7.5%
- Rank: 342 out of 423
Services
Preceding station	New York City Subway	Following station
Nereid Avenue 2 5 toward Wakefield–241st Street	Local	225th Street 2 5 toward Flatbush Avenue–Brooklyn College
Location
Location within New York City Subway
Location within New York City
Location within New York
Track layout
Street map
Station service legend
Symbol	Description
Stops all times	Stops all times
Stops rush hours in the peak direction only	Stops rush hours in the peak direction only

The 233rd Street station is a local station on the IRT White Plains Road Line of the New York City Subway. Located at the intersection of 233rd Street and White Plains Road in the Wakefield neighborhood of the Bronx, it is served by the 2 train at all times and by the 5 train during rush hours in the peak direction.

== History ==
This station was built under the Dual Contracts. On March 3, 1917, the IRT White Plains Road Line was extended from East 177th Street–East Tremont Avenue to East 219th Street–White Plains Road, providing the Bronx communities of Williamsbridge and Wakefield with access to rapid transit service. Service was initially operated as a four-car shuttle from 177th Street due to the power conditions at the time. An extension to Nereid Avenue, including the 225th Street and 233rd Street stations, finally opened on March 31, 1917. The city government took over the IRT's operations on June 12, 1940.

It was renovated in 2006 at a cost of $15.26 million. At the same time, another project was undertaken to install elevators at the station, making it ADA-accessible at a cost of $2.48 million.

== Station layout ==
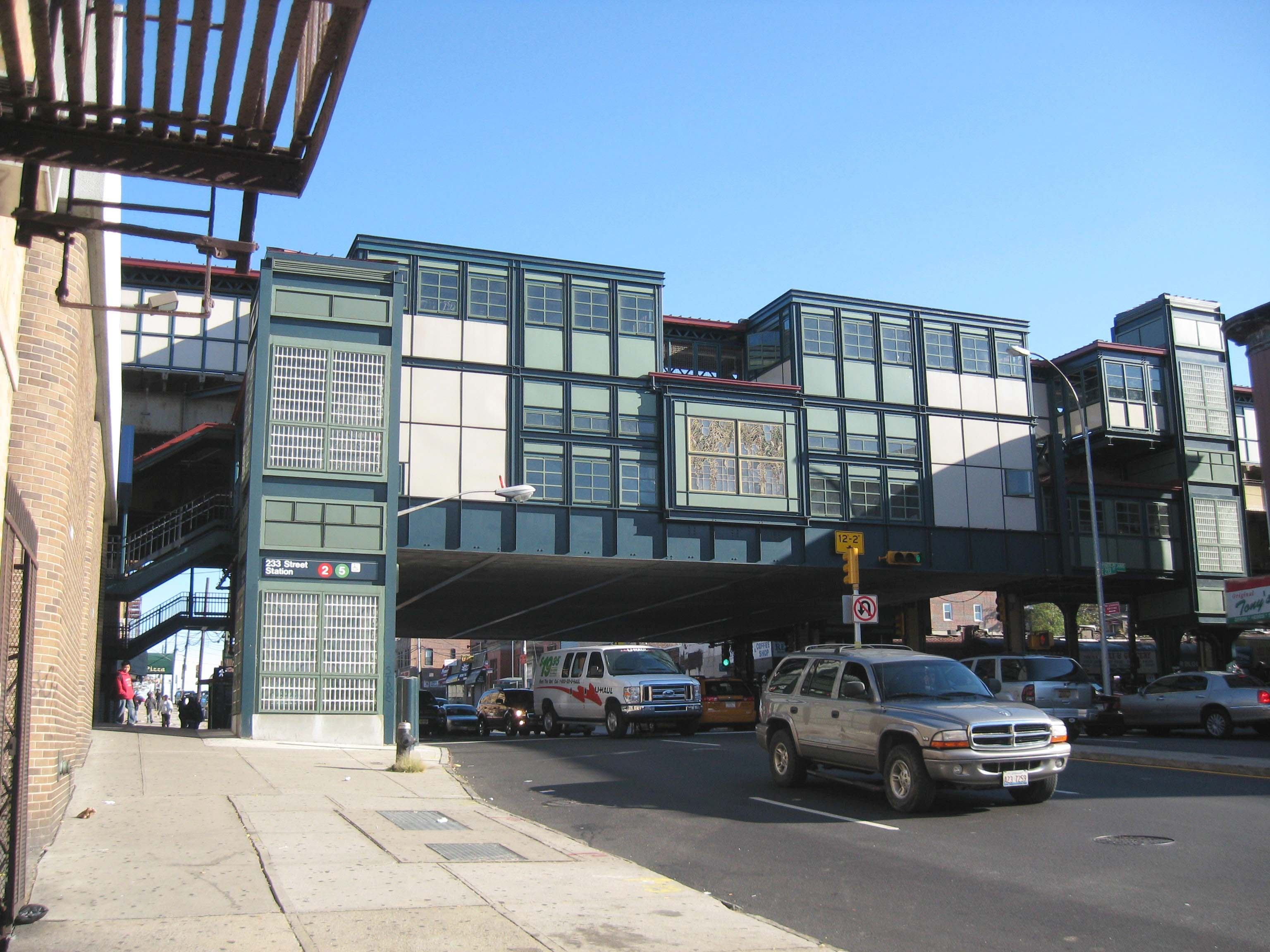
Western side

This elevated station has three tracks and two side platforms. The center express track is not normally used in revenue service. Both platforms have beige windscreens and red canopies supported by green frames and columns in the center. They also have yellow ADA tactile strips on their edges. These were all installed during the 2006 rehabilitation. On either ends, both platforms have black waist-high fences made of steel, with white lampposts at regular intervals. The station signs are in the standard black name plates with white lettering.

The 2006 artwork here is called Secret Garden: There's No Place Like Home by Skowmon Hastanan. It consists of stained glass panels on the platform windscreens and station house depicting plants, fruits, and trees, being inspired by the New York Botanical Garden.

=== Exits ===
This station has one elevated station house below the tracks and platforms. Two staircases and one elevator from each platform go down to a waiting area/crossover, where a turnstile bank and two exit-only turnstiles provide access to and from the platforms. Outside fare control, there is a token booth and two staircases going down to either northern corners of White Plains Road and East 233rd Street. There is also an elevator going down to the northwest corner. The three elevators make the station ADA-accessible.
