= Pelham Parkway station (IRT White Plains Road Line) =

New York City Subway station in the Bronx

Pelham Parkway
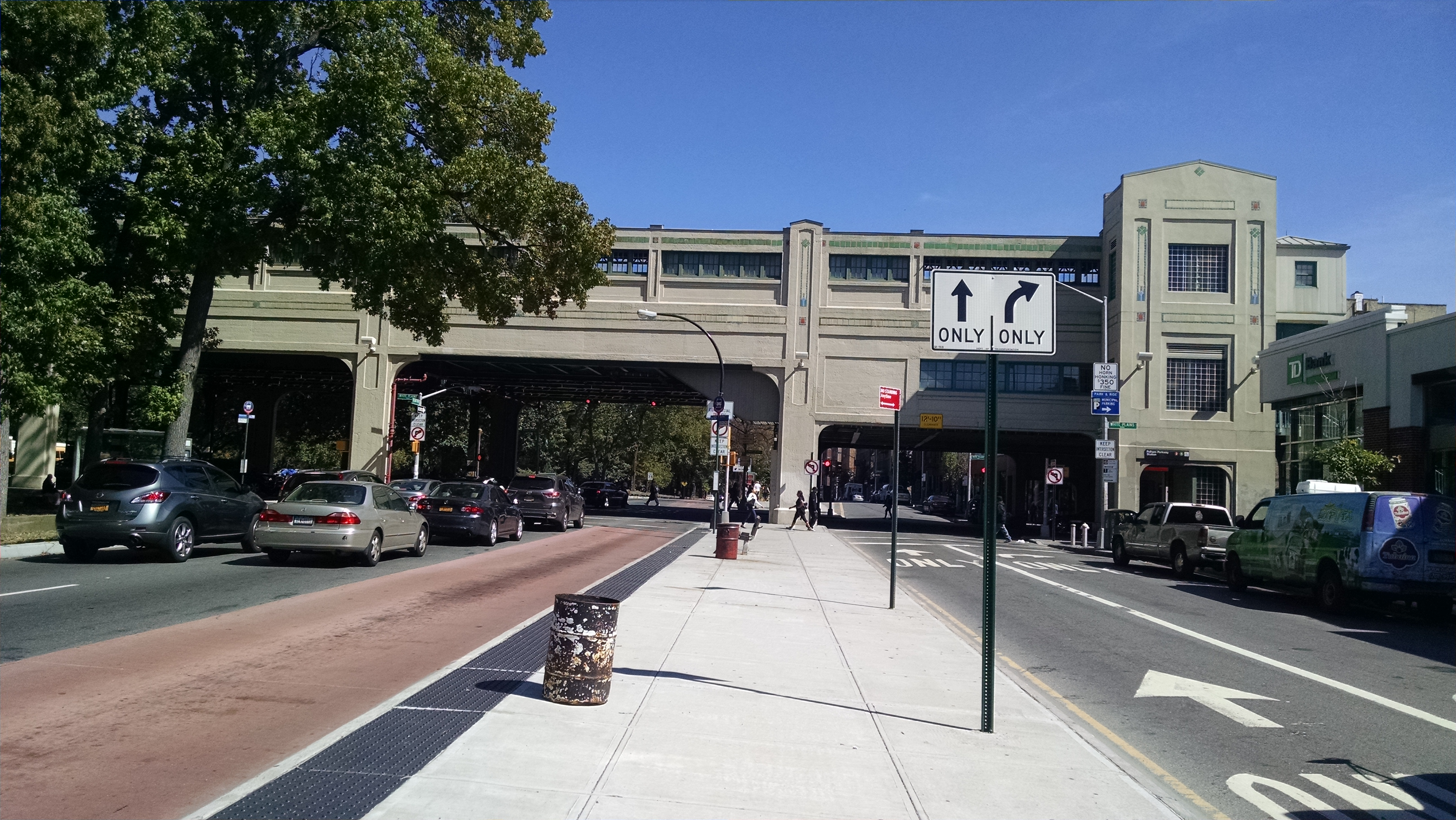
- Street entrance, as seen from the eastbound Pelham Parkway

Station statistics
- Address: Pelham Parkway & White Plains Road; Bronx, New York
- Borough: The Bronx
- Locale: Pelham Parkway
- Coordinates: 40.857°N 73.868°W
- Division: A (IRT)
- Line: IRT White Plains Road Line
- Services: 2 (all times); 5 (limited weekday rush hour service in the peak direction)
- Transit: NYCT Bus: Bx12, Bx12 SBS, Bx22, Bx30, Bx39; MTA Bus: BxM11; Bee-Line Bus: 60, 61, 62
- Structure: Elevated
- Platforms: 2 side platforms
- Tracks: 3

Other information
- Opened: March 3, 1917; 109 years ago
- Accessible: Yes

Traffic
- 2025: 1,550,244 ▲2.1%
- Rank: 225 out of 423
Services
Preceding station	New York City Subway	Following station
Allerton Avenue 2 5 toward Wakefield–241st Street	Local	Bronx Park East 2 5 toward Flatbush Avenue–Brooklyn College
Location
Location within New York City Subway
Location within New York City
Location within New York
Track layout
Street map
Station service legend
Symbol	Description
Stops all times	Stops all times
Stops rush hours in the peak direction only	Stops rush hours in the peak direction only
- Pelham Parkway Station (Dual System IRT)
- U.S. National Register of Historic Places
- MPS: New York City Subway System MPS
- NRHP reference No.: 05000228
- Added to NRHP: March 30, 2005

The Pelham Parkway station (referred to on strip maps as Pelham Parkway–White Plains Road) is a local station on the IRT White Plains Road Line of the New York City Subway. Located at the intersection of Pelham Parkway and White Plains Road in the Pelham Parkway neighborhood of the Bronx, it is served by the 2 train at all times and by the 5 train during rush hours in the peak direction.

== History ==
This station was built under the Dual Contracts. It opened on March 3, 1917, as part of an extension of the IRT White Plains Road Line from East 177th Street–East Tremont Avenue to East 219th Street–White Plains Road, providing the Bronx communities of Williamsbridge and Wakefield with access to rapid transit service. Service on the new portion of the line was operated as a four-car shuttle from 177th Street due to the power conditions at the time. The city government took over the IRT's operations on June 12, 1940.

This station was added to the National Register of Historic Places on March 30, 2005. It was renovated in 2007 at a cost of $18.85 million (equivalent to $29,268,777 in 2025). At the same time, another project was undertaken to install elevators at the station, making it ADA-accessible for $2.43 million (equivalent to $3,773,110 in 2025).

== Station layout ==
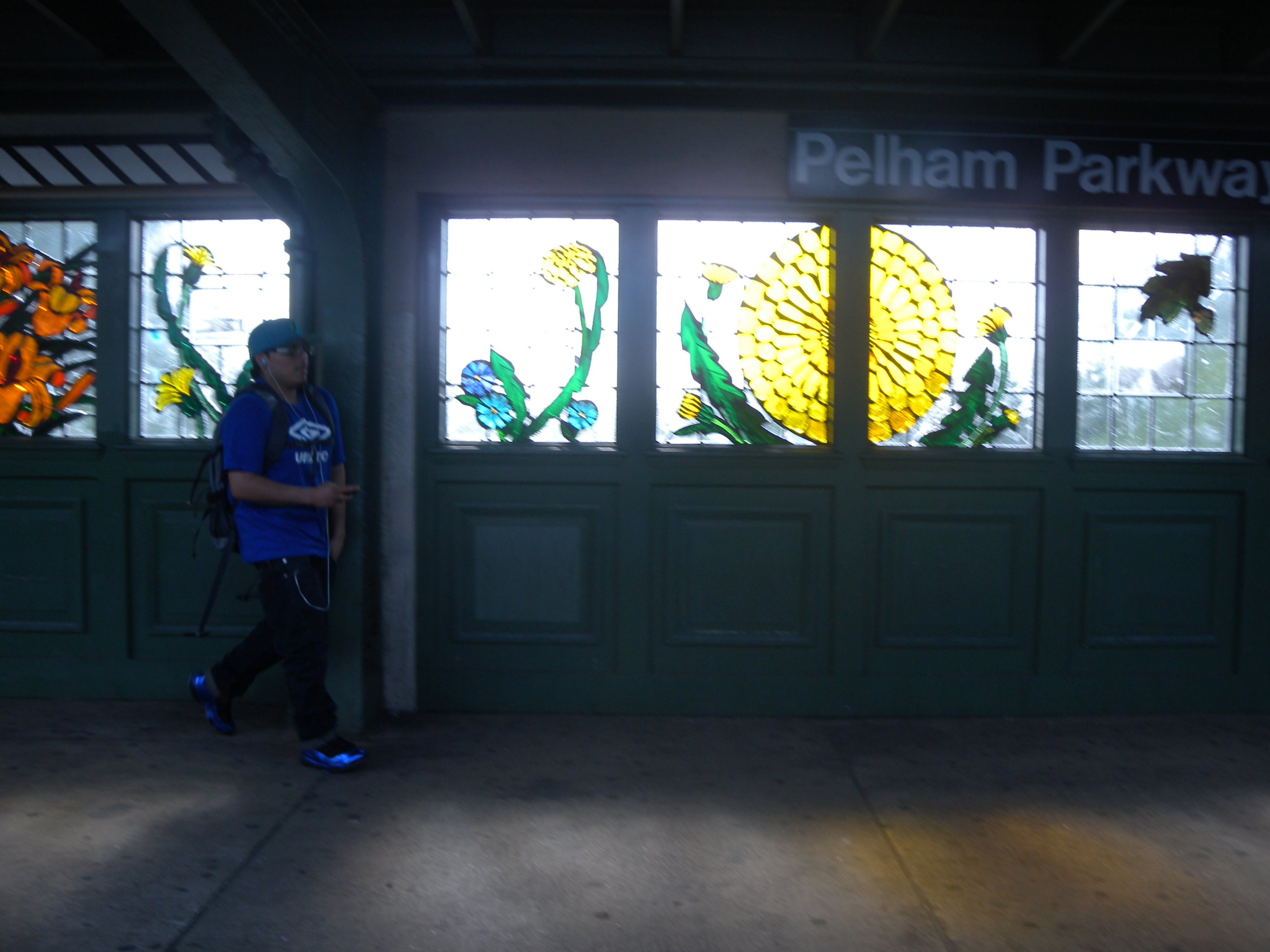
Southbound platform

This elevated station has three tracks and two side platforms with the center express track only used for select AM rush hour 5 trains terminating at Gun Hill Road.

Due to the width of Pelham Parkway and its service roads, the entire station, including the platform windscreens, canopies, and outer street support columns, is enclosed in concrete over the steel structure. A green trim line runs on top of the windscreens and no columns support the canopies.

=== Exits ===
This station has two mezzanines, both of which are beneath the tracks and platforms. The full-time one is at the south end and has a staircase and elevator from each platform going down to a waiting area/crossunder, where a turnstile bank provides access to and from the station. The Manhattan-bound platform also has a short, up-only escalator from the station house. Outside fare control, there is a token booth, one staircase and elevator going down to the southwest corner of Pelham Parkway's south service road and White Plains Road, and one up-escalator from the southeast corner of the same intersection. The three elevators make this station fully ADA-accessible.

The north station house, which was renovated in the late 1990s, is unstaffed, containing two staircases from each platform, two more from either northern corners of Pelham Parkway's north service road and White Plains Road, and full height turnstiles.

== Artwork ==
In 1976, with funding from the Exxon Corporation, this station, as well as three others citywide, received new "artfully humorous graffiti" murals and artwork. Local designer Peter Bradford Associates received $5,000 to repaint the station and put "16 bright posters of animals and parts of animals" on each platform wall, in the theme of the nearby Bronx Zoo.

The current artwork at this station, installed during a 2004-2007 renovation, is called Back to the Garden by Tomie Arai. It consists of stained glass windows on the platform windscreens depicting images of trees and plants, inspired by the nearby zoo and botanical garden.
