= Burke Avenue station =

New York City Subway station in the Bronx

Burke Avenue
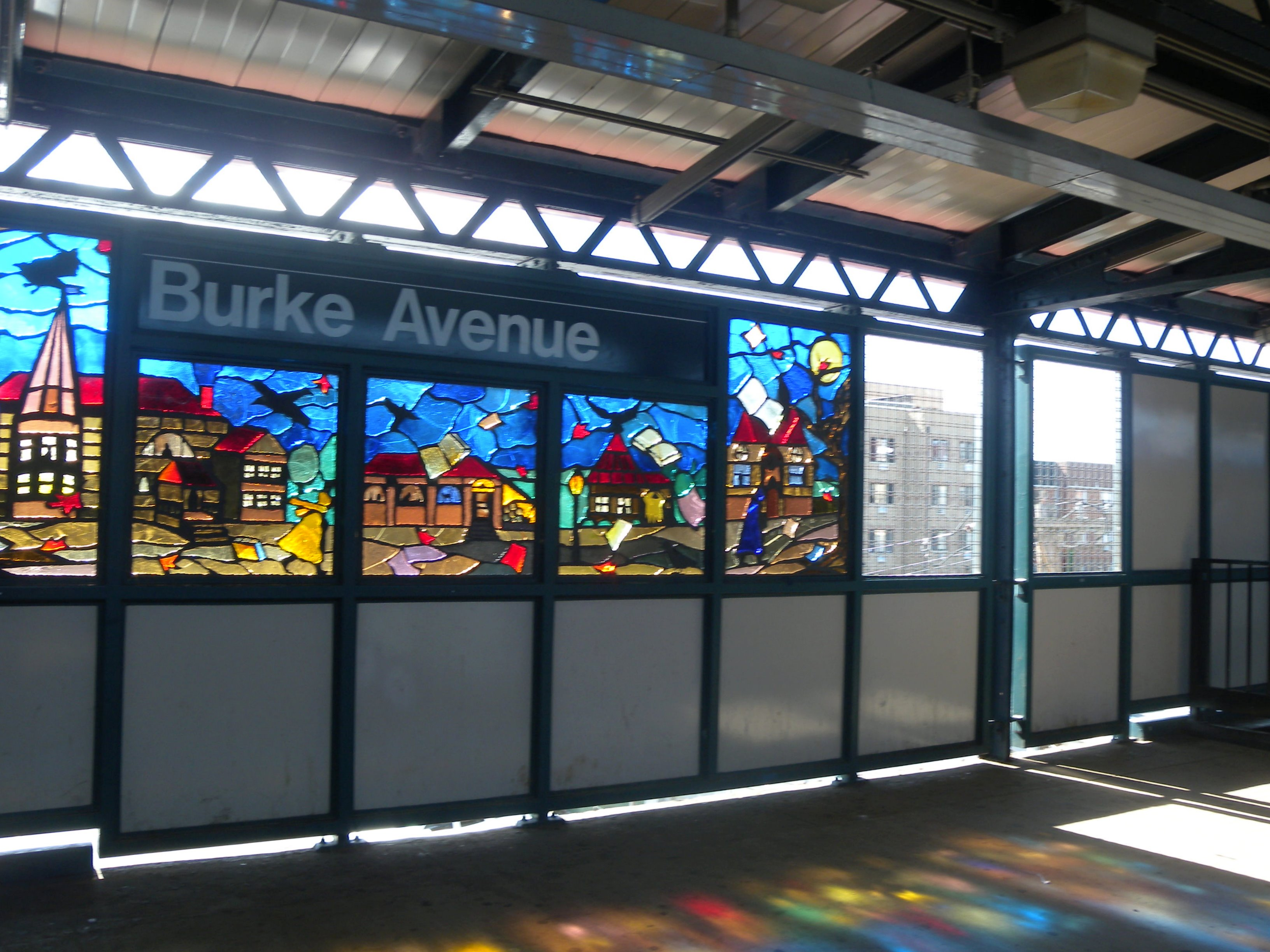
- Southbound platform

Station statistics
- Address: Burke Avenue & White Plains Road; Bronx, New York
- Borough: The Bronx
- Locale: Williamsbridge
- Coordinates: 40.871°N 73.867°W
- Division: A (IRT)
- Line: IRT White Plains Road Line
- Services: 2 (all times); 5 (limited weekday rush hour service in the peak direction)
- Transit: NYCT Bus: Bx39; MTA Bus: BxM11
- Structure: Elevated
- Platforms: 2 side platforms
- Tracks: 3

Other information
- Opened: March 3, 1917; 109 years ago

Traffic
- 2025: 529,080 ▲7.2%
- Rank: 389 out of 423
Services
Preceding station	New York City Subway	Following station
Gun Hill Road 2 5 toward Wakefield–241st Street	Local	Allerton Avenue 2 5 toward Flatbush Avenue–Brooklyn College
Location
Location within New York City Subway
Location within New York City
Location within New York
Track layout
Street map
Station service legend
Symbol	Description
Stops all times	Stops all times
Stops rush hours in the peak direction only	Stops rush hours in the peak direction only

The Burke Avenue station is a local station on the IRT White Plains Road Line of the New York City Subway. Located at the intersection of Burke Avenue and White Plains Road in the Williamsbridge neighborhood of the Bronx, it is served by the 2 train at all times and by the 5 train during rush hours in the peak direction.

== History ==
This station was built under the Dual Contracts. It opened on March 3, 1917, as part of an extension of the IRT White Plains Road Line from East 177th Street–East Tremont Avenue to East 219th Street–White Plains Road, providing the Bronx communities of Williamsbridge and Wakefield with access to rapid transit service. Service on the new portion of the line was operated as a four-car shuttle from 177th Street due to the power conditions at the time. The city government took over the IRT's operations on June 12, 1940.

It was renovated in 2004-2005 at a cost of approximately $12.48 million.

== Station layout ==
This elevated station has three tracks and two side platforms. The center track is not normally used in revenue service.

Both platforms have beige windscreens and red canopies with green outlines, frames, and support columns in the center and black, waist-high steel fences at either ends with lampposts at regular intervals. The windscreens have mesh fences at various points. The station signs are in the standard black name plates with white lettering.

The 2006 artwork here is called Bronx Literature by Béatrice Coron. It consists of stained glass panels on the platform windscreens featuring scenes from various works of literature written by four authors, Sholom Aleichem, James Baldwin, Nicholasa Mohr, and Edgar Allan Poe, all of whom have lived in or wrote about the Bronx.

=== Exits ===
This station has one elevated station house beneath the center of the platforms and tracks. Two staircases from each platform go down to a waiting area. The back of the token booth faces this crossunder with a steel fences on either side. On the Wakefield-bound side, there are two exit only turnstiles. On the Manhattan-bound side, there is an emergency gate and a bank of three turnstiles. Outside fare control, two staircases go down to the northwest and southeast corners of Burke Avenue and White Plains Road. The station house has windows.
