= Bronx Park East station =

New York City Subway station in the Bronx

Bronx Park East
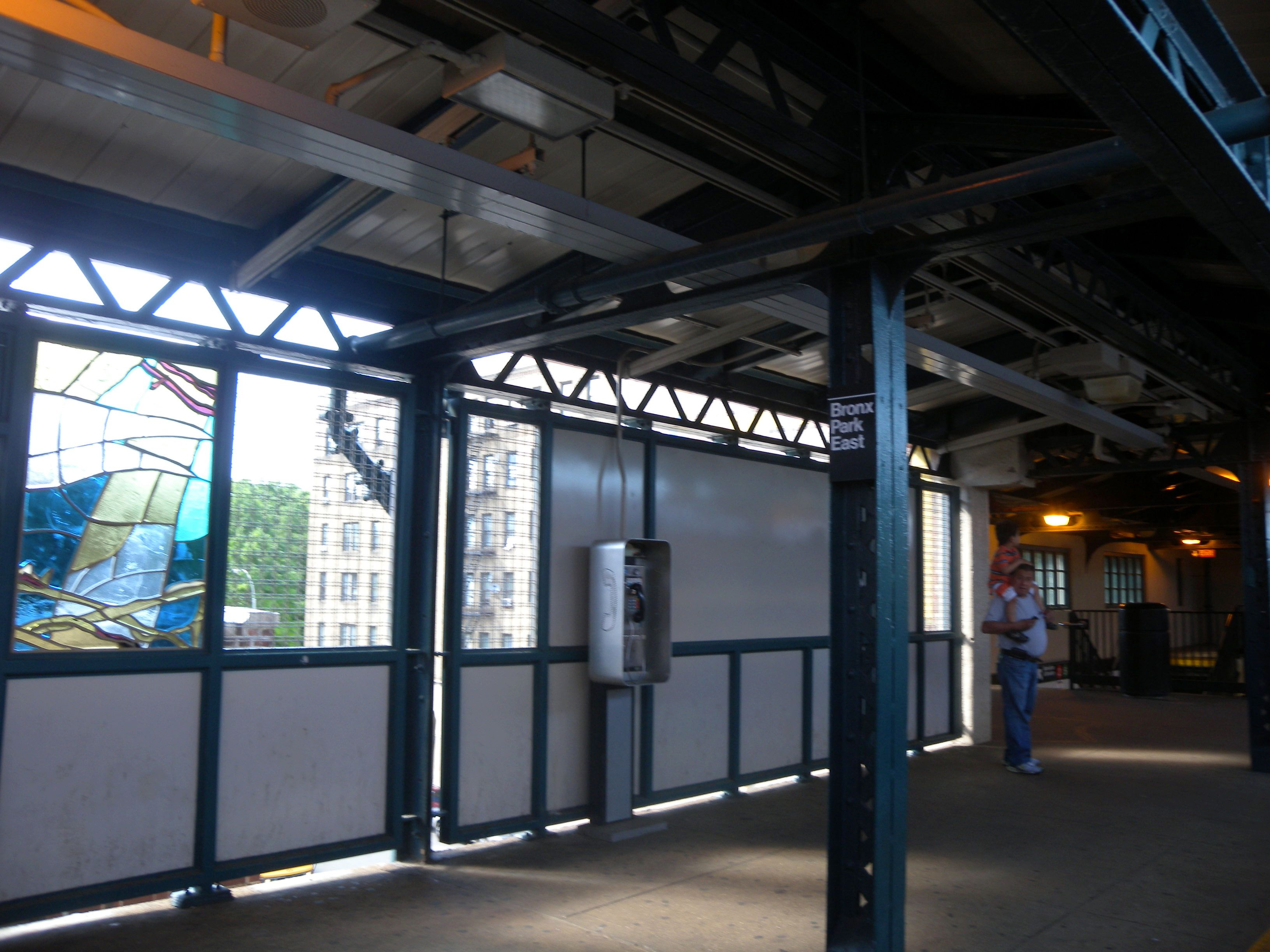
- Southbound platform

Station statistics
- Address: Birchall Avenue & Sagamore Street; Bronx, New York
- Borough: The Bronx
- Locale: Van Nest/Pelham Parkway
- Coordinates: 40.849°N 73.868°W
- Division
- Line: IRT White Plains Road Line
- Services: 2 (all times); 5 (limited weekday rush hour service in the peak direction)
- Transit: NYCT Bus: Bx22, Bx39
- Structure: Elevated
- Platforms: 2 side platforms
- Tracks: 3

Other information
- Opened: March 3, 1917; 109 years ago

Traffic
- 2025: 493,995 ▲13.8%
- Rank: 397 out of 423
Services
Preceding station	New York City Subway	Following station
Pelham Parkway 2 5 toward Wakefield–241st Street	Local	East 180th Street 2 5 toward Flatbush Avenue–Brooklyn College
Location
Location within New York City Subway
Location within New York City
Location within New York
Track layout
Street map
Station service legend
Symbol	Description
Stops all times	Stops all times
Stops rush hours in the peak direction only	Stops rush hours in the peak direction only

The Bronx Park East station is a local station on the IRT White Plains Road Line of the New York City Subway. Located on Birchall Avenue at Sagamore Street in the Van Nest and Pelham Parkway neighborhoods of the Bronx, it is served by the 2 train at all times and by the 5 train during rush hours in the peak direction.

== History ==
This station was built under the Dual Contracts. It opened on March 3, 1917, as part of an extension of the IRT White Plains Road Line from East 177th Street–East Tremont Avenue to East 219th Street–White Plains Road, providing the Bronx communities of Williamsbridge and Wakefield with access to rapid transit service. Service on the new portion of the line was operated as a four-car shuttle from 177th Street due to the power conditions at the time. The city government took over the IRT's operations on June 12, 1940.

It was renovated in 2007 at a cost of $12.92 million.

== Station layout ==
This elevated station has three tracks and two side platforms. Old signs at the center exit stairs and have been painted over, but those on the southbound platform are still visible through the paint. Covered windows in the concrete wall are also present.

This station and the Pelham Parkway station are the only stations on the White Plains Road Line to be built in decorative concrete structures. The entrances at this station were built in this manner as Sagamore Street was the new main entrance to Bronx Park.

South of this station, one can view the IRT Dyre Avenue Line just off to the east. Continuing south, the Unionport Yard is also to the east past the connection to the Dyre Avenue Line. The East 180th Street Yard is to the west just prior to entering the next station, East 180th Street.

The 2006 artwork here is called B is for Birds in the Bronx by Candida Alvarez.

=== Exits ===
The tiled mezzanine has windows and standard "Uptown" and "Downtown" mosaics. The mezzanine itself is made of stucco over concrete and is massive. There are exits to all corners of Birchall Avenue and Sagamore Street except for the southwest corner, which had its exit sealed for unknown reasons.
