= 238th Street =

238th Street may refer to the following New York City Subway stations in the Bronx:

- 238th Street station, at Broadway serving the 1 train
- Nereid Avenue station, formerly East 238th Street, at White Plains Road serving the 2 and 5 trains
