= 225th Street =

225th Street may refer to the following stations of the New York City Subway:

- 225th Street (IRT White Plains Road Line), in the Bronx; serving the 2 and 5 trains
- Marble Hill – 225th Street (IRT Broadway – Seventh Avenue Line), in Manhattan; serving the 1 train
