= Magenta Playground =

Public park in the Bronx, New York

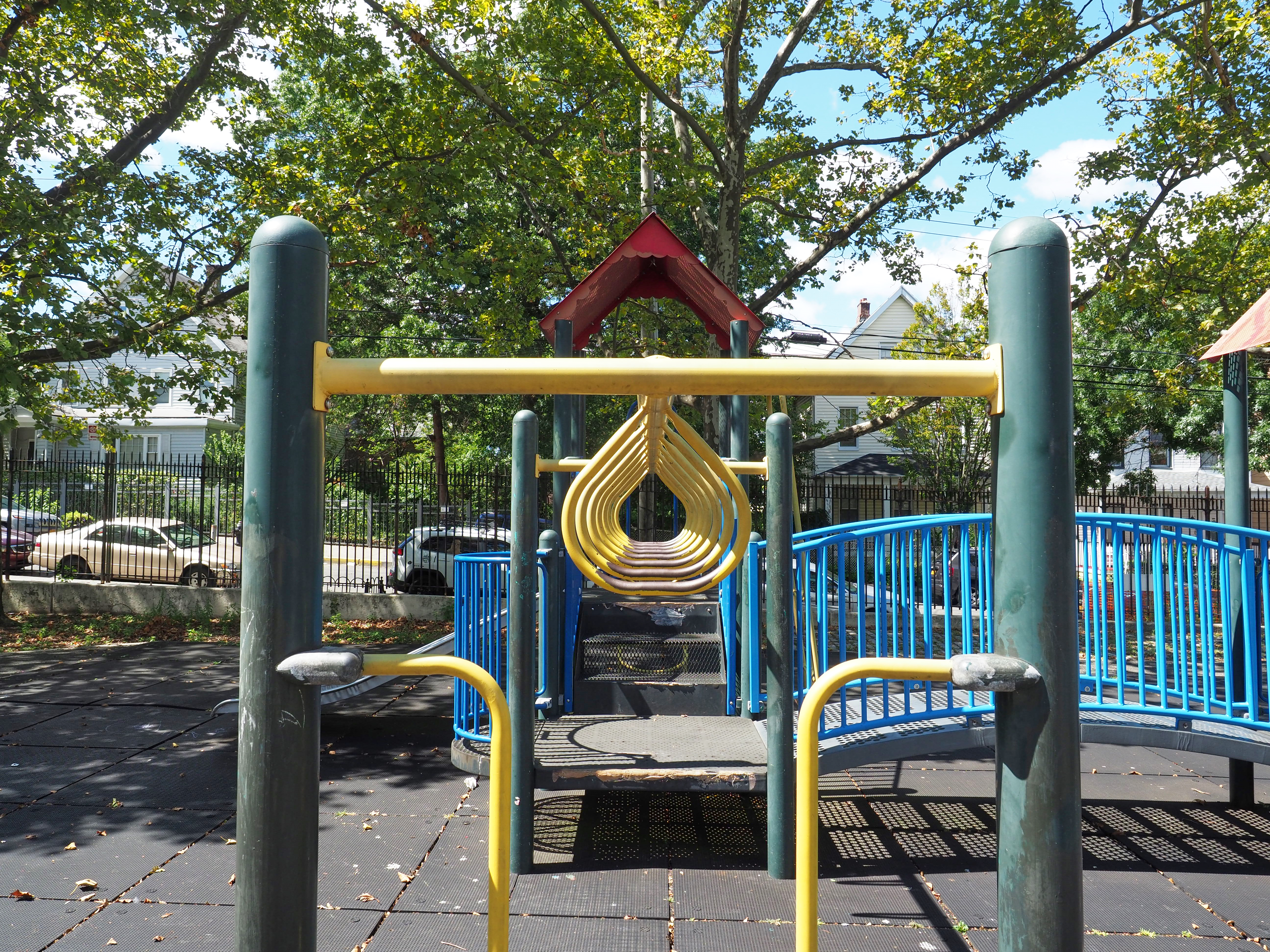
- Type: Playground
- Coordinates: 40.8737358°N 73.8680525°W
- Area: 1.21 acres (0.49 hectares)
- Established: 1966

Magenta Playground is a 1.21-acre (0.49-hectare) park in the Allerton section of The Bronx in New York City. It includes basketball and handball courts, a children's play area with a climbable seal sculpture, spray shower, and restrooms. Most of these were installed during a 1998 renovation.

The land for the park was acquired by New York City via condemnation in 1960, and opened as a park in 1966. The park is next to Gun Hill Road school (Bronx PS 41, K-12) and is operated jointly by NYC Parks and the NYC Department of Education. It is within Bronx City Council District 12. The name Magenta Playground dates to 1987, when the park was renamed.
