= Gun Hill Road station (IRT White Plains Road Line) =

New York City Subway station in the Bronx

Gun Hill Road
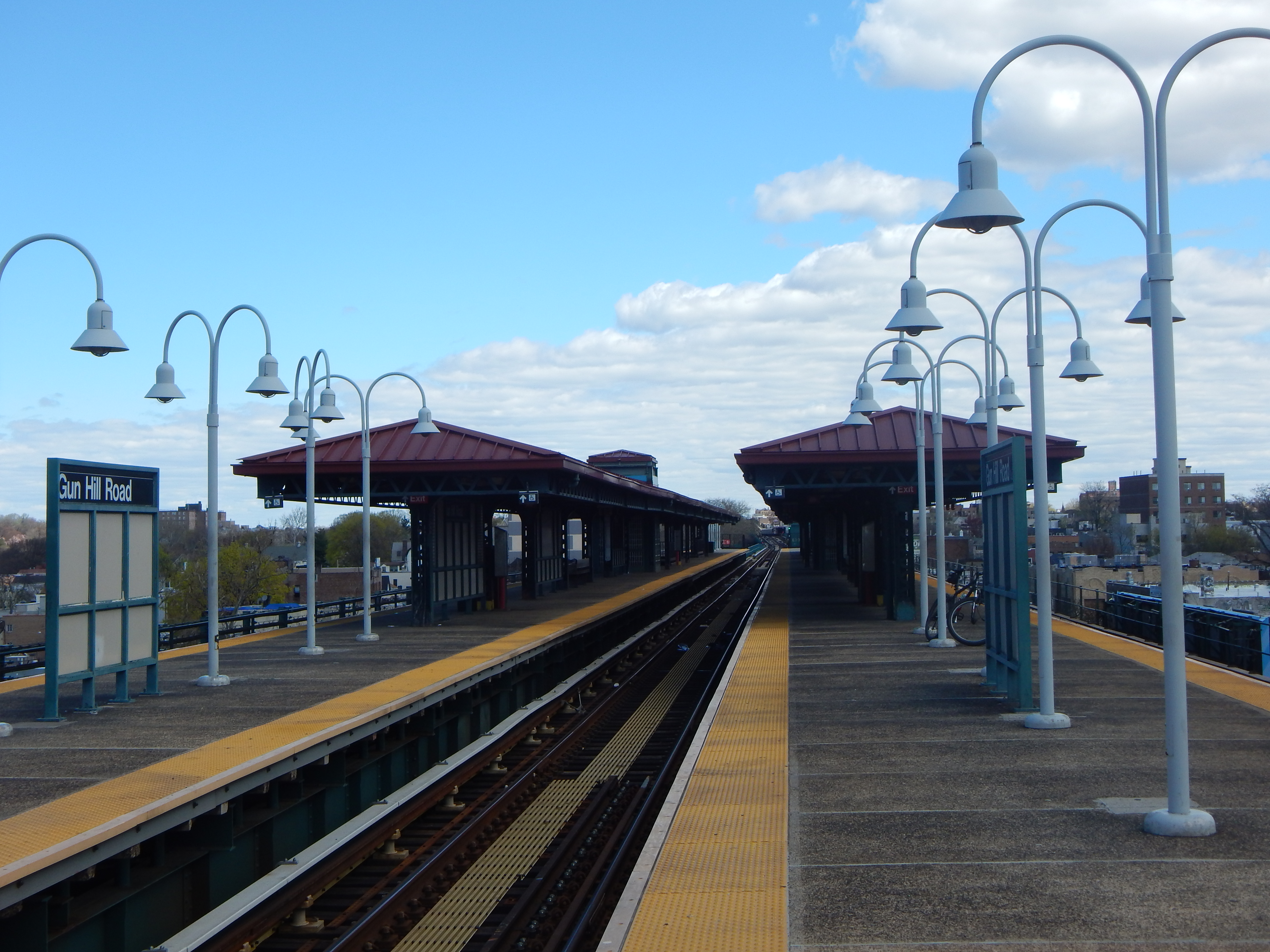
- The Gun Hill Road station platform in April 2015.

Station statistics
- Address: East Gun Hill Road & White Plains Road; Bronx, New York 10467
- Borough: The Bronx
- Locale: Williamsbridge
- Coordinates: 40.877°N 73.867°W
- Division: A (IRT)
- Line: IRT White Plains Road Line; IRT Third Avenue Line (formerly)
- Services: 2 (all times); 5 (limited weekday rush hour service in the peak direction)
- Transit: NYCT Bus: Bx28, Bx38, Bx39, Bx41, Bx41 SBS; MTA Bus: BxM11; Metro-North: Harlem Line (at Williams Bridge)
- Structure: Elevated
- Levels: 2 (lower level abandoned)
- Platforms: 2 island platforms cross-platform interchange
- Tracks: 3

Other information
- Opened: March 3, 1917; 109 years ago (upper level); October 4, 1920; 106 years ago (lower level)
- Closed: April 29, 1973; 53 years ago (lower level)
- Accessible: Yes

Traffic
- 2025: 1,271,969 ▲2.5%
- Rank: 264 out of 423
Services
Preceding station	New York City Subway	Following station
219th Street 2 5 toward Wakefield–241st Street	Local	Burke Avenue 2 5 toward Flatbush Avenue–Brooklyn College
Non-revenue services and lines
Preceding station	New York City Subway	Following station
Wakefield–241st Street express	no service	East 180th Street express
	no service	Fordham Road–190th Street 3rd Ave express; demolished
	no service	Williamsbridge–210th Street 3rd Ave local; demolished
Location
Location within New York City Subway
Location within New York City
Location within New York
Track layout
Street map
Station service legend
Symbol	Description
Stops all times	Stops all times
Stops rush hours in the peak direction only	Stops rush hours in the peak direction only

The Gun Hill Road station (referred to on strip maps as Gun Hill Road–White Plains Road) is an express station on the IRT White Plains Road Line of the New York City Subway. Located at the intersection of Gun Hill and White Plains Roads in the Williamsbridge neighborhood of the Bronx, it is served by the 2 train at all times and by the 5 train during rush hours in the peak direction; limited a.m. rush hour 5 trains from Manhattan also terminate at this station in the northbound direction only.

== History ==
This station was built under the Dual Contracts. It opened on March 3, 1917, as part of an extension of the IRT White Plains Road Line from East 177th Street–East Tremont Avenue to East 219th Street–White Plains Road, providing the Bronx communities of Williamsbridge and Wakefield with access to rapid transit service. Service on the new portion of the line was operated as a four-car shuttle from 177th Street due to the power conditions at the time.

The lower level was used by the IRT Third Avenue Line from October 4, 1920, until the line's abandonment on April 29, 1973.

The city government took over the IRT's operations on June 12, 1940. The station was renovated in 2007 at a cost of $31.68 million.

== Station layout ==
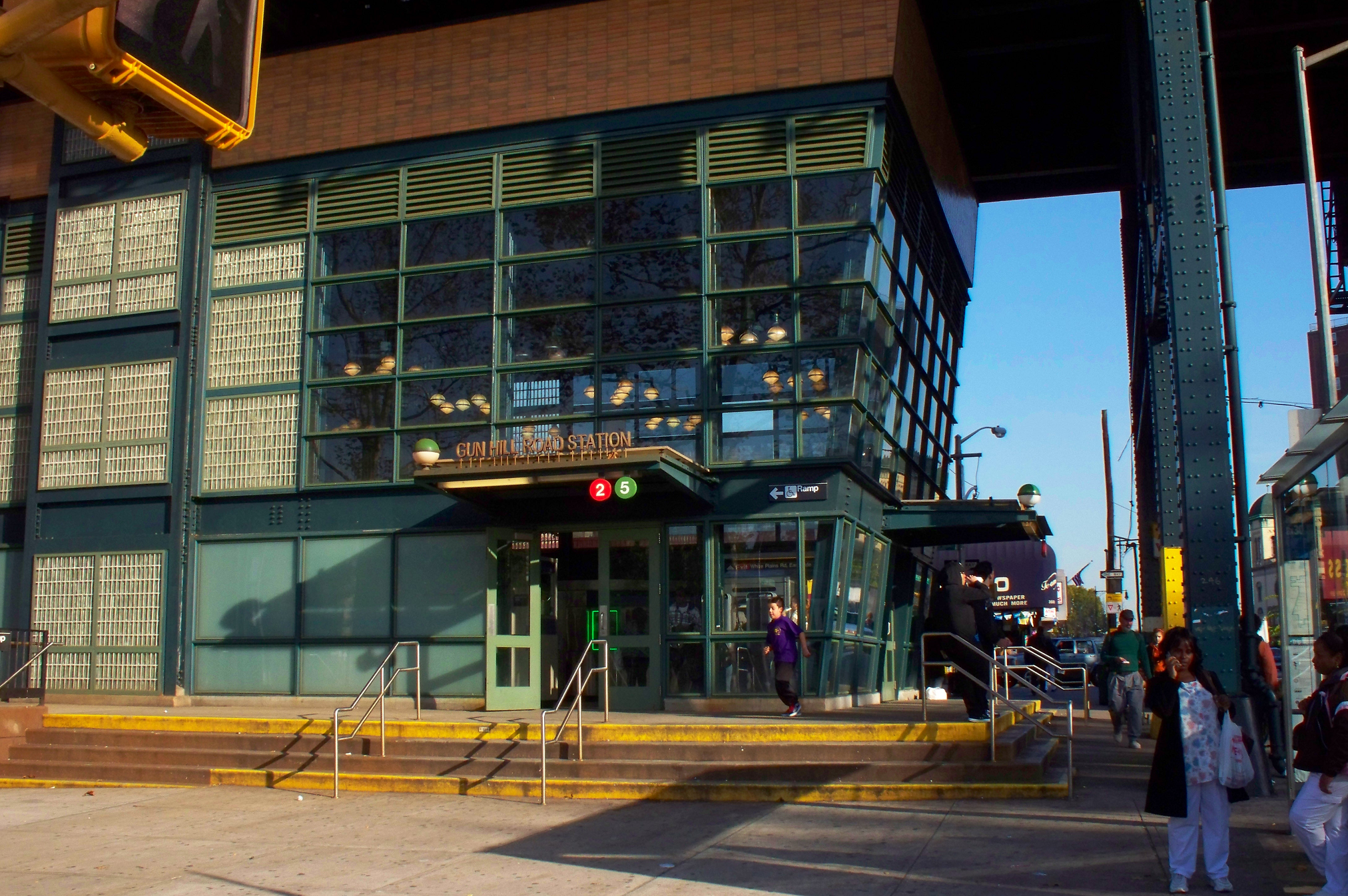
Entrance

The station was designed as a bi-level station. The upper level has three tracks and two island platforms, while the lower level had two tracks and one wide island platform. North of the station, the lower level tracks rose and joined, making a five track line for a short distance. From west to east, they were as follows: White Plains Road Line southbound local, Third Avenue Line southbound, White Plains Road Line center express, Third Avenue Line northbound, White Plains Road Line northbound local.

=== Exit ===
The station's only exit is at a street-level station house at the north side of Gun Hill Road in the median of White Plains Road. The mid-2000s refurbishment removed the Third Avenue el level and upgraded the station with the new station house at street level. The original station house was one short block north at East 211th Street. New escalators and elevators now make this station ADA-accessible.
