= Skowmon Hastanan =

Thai-born American float glass painter

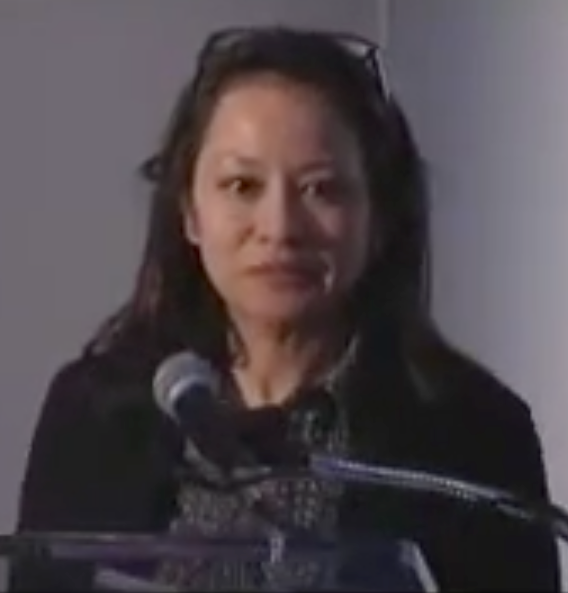
- At the Brooklyn Museum in 2007
- Born: Thailand
- Occupation: Painter
- Website: www.skowmon.com

Skowmon Hastanan is a Thai-born American float glass painter. Hastanan has participated in several national and international exhibitions: A Space (Toronto), Delta Axis Art Center (Memphis), Fészek Galleria (Budapest), Gallery 4A (Sydney, Australia), Jamaica Center for Arts (New York City), Pier 2 Arts District (Taiwan), Randolph Street Gallery (Chicago), Real Art Ways (Hartford, Connecticut), and Wave Hill New York City. Hastanan produces paintings with religious Himalayan influences, featuring sexualized images of Thai women.

In 2001 she completed the float glass piece Orbis Venustas for the Early Childhood Center Public School 228 in Queens, New York.
