= Nereid Avenue station =

New York City Subway station in the Bronx

Nereid Avenue
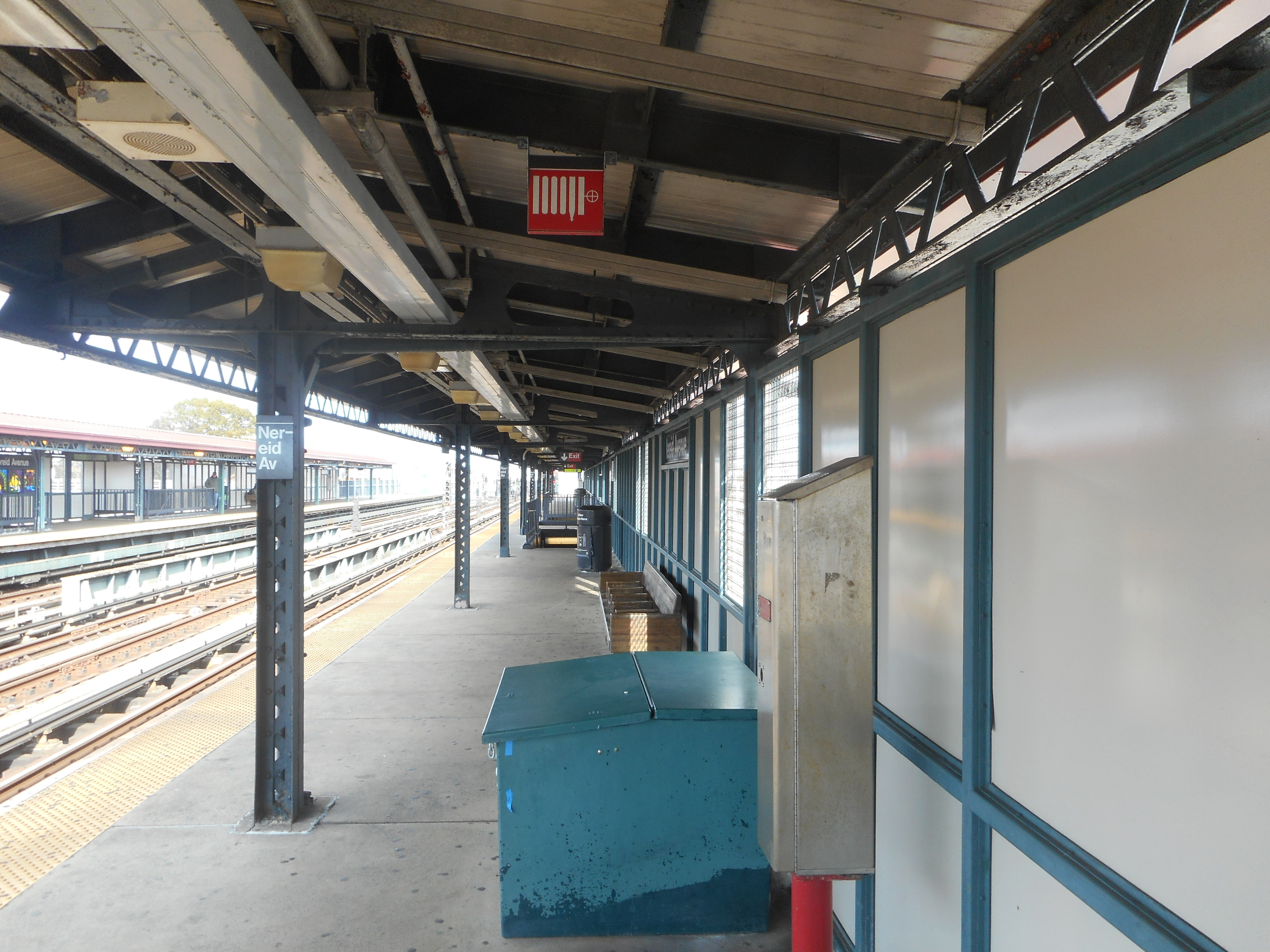
- Northbound platform

Station statistics
- Address: Nereid Avenue (East 238th Street) & White Plains Road; Bronx, New York
- Borough: The Bronx
- Locale: Wakefield
- Coordinates: 40.898°N 73.854°W
- Division: A (IRT)
- Line: IRT White Plains Road Line
- Services: 2 (all times); 5 (limited weekday rush hour service in the peak direction)
- Transit: NYCT Bus: Bx16, Bx39; MTA Bus: BxM11; Bee-Line Bus: 25, 26, 42
- Structure: Elevated
- Platforms: 2 side platforms
- Tracks: 3 (2 in regular service)

Other information
- Opened: March 31, 1917; 109 years ago
- Former/other names: East 238th Street; 238th Street–Nereid Avenue; Nereid Avenue–238th Street

Traffic
- 2025: 569,512 ▲8.6%
- Rank: 379 out of 423
Services
Preceding station	New York City Subway	Following station
Wakefield–241st Street 2 Terminus	Local	233rd Street 2 5 toward Flatbush Avenue–Brooklyn College
Location
Location within New York City Subway
Location within New York City
Location within New York
Track layout
Street map
Station service legend
Symbol	Description
Stops all times	Stops all times
Stops rush hours in the peak direction only	Stops rush hours in the peak direction only

The Nereid Avenue station (/ˈnɪəriɪd/ NEER-ee-id; formerly East 238th Street station) is a local station on the IRT White Plains Road Line of the New York City Subway, located at the intersection of Nereid Avenue (East 238th Street) and White Plains Road in the Wakefield neighborhood of the Bronx. It is served by the 2 train at all times and by the 5 train during rush hours in the peak direction. Nereid Avenue is the northern terminal for all peak-direction rush-hour 5 trains that use this branch. However, all 2 trains terminate at the next stop, Wakefield–241st Street.

== History ==
This station was built under the Dual Contracts. On March 3, 1917, IRT White Plains Road Line was extended from East 177th Street–East Tremont Avenue to East 219th Street–White Plains Road, providing the Bronx communities of Williamsbridge and Wakefield with access to rapid transit service. Service was initially operated as a four-car shuttle from 177th Street due to the power conditions at the time. An extension to 238th Street, including the 225th Street and 233rd Street stations, finally opened on March 31, 1917. On July 18, 1917, at the request of local residents near the station, the New York Public Service Commission changed the name of the station from Nereid Avenue to East 238th Street.

On December 13, 1920, the final portion of the line opened, extending the line from its previous terminal at 238th Street to the line's permanent terminus at 241st Street. This portion of the line had its opening delayed, owing to construction on the line between the two stations for the construction of the 239th Street Yard to the north of 238th Street. Additional time was required to modify the structure to avoid a grade crossing at the entrance to the yard. The city government took over the IRT's operations on June 12, 1940.

The station was renovated in 2007 at a cost of $14.46 million.

== Station layout ==
This station has three tracks and two side platforms. At the north end of the station, the northbound track ascends to pass over yard leads, while the others descend. A three-story tower is located north of the station which has an old blue and white letter sign "Warning — Do not lean over edge of Platform." North of this tower, two tracks enter the line from the 239th Street Yard.

The 2006 artwork here is called Leaf of Life by Noel Copeland.

=== Exits ===
This station has one elevated station house beneath the center of the platforms and tracks. Two staircases from each platform go down to a waiting area. Outside fare control, two staircases go down to the northwest and southeast corners of Nereid Avenue and White Plains Road.
