= 5 (New York City Subway service) =

Rapid transit service

- Lexington Avenue Express

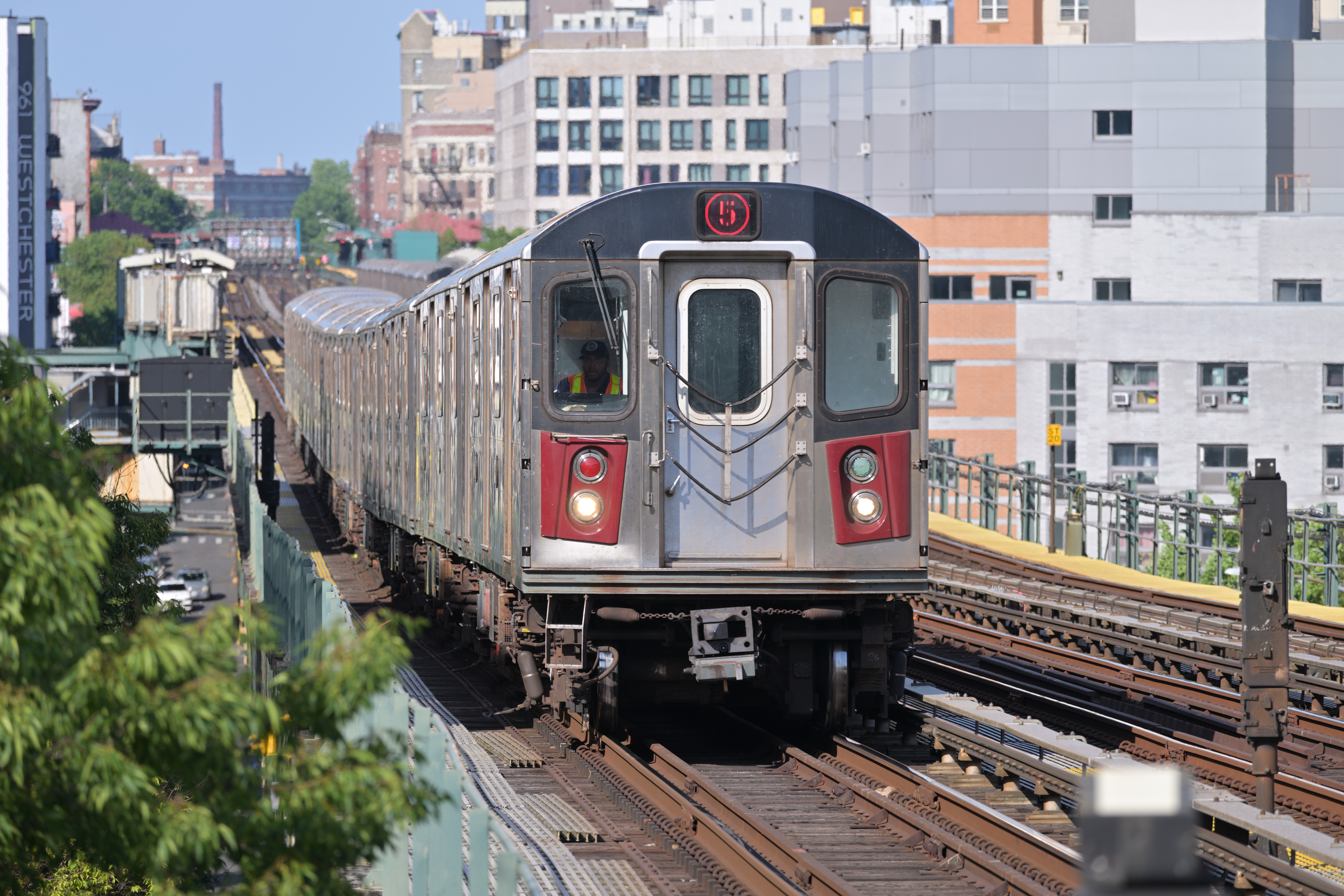
- A Manhattan-bound 5 train of R142s approaching Prospect Avenue

- Note: Dark dashed line indicates weekday rush hour service to Nereid Avenue and weekday service to Flatbush Avenue–Brooklyn College. Dashed pink line shows limited rush hour service to Utica Avenue or from New Lots Avenue.
- Northern end: Dyre Avenue (All times); Nereid Avenue (limited rush hour service)
- Southern end: East 180th Street (late nights); Bowling Green (weekends and mid-weekday evenings); Flatbush Avenue (weekdays); Utica Avenue and New Lots Avenue (limited rush hour service)
- Stations: 36; 33 (rush hour service); 53 (limited services); 25 (weekend service); 6 (late night service)
- Rolling stock: R142 (Rolling stock assignments subject to change)
- Depot: East 180th Street Yard (fleet interchangeable with at 239th Street Yard)
- Started service: October 27, 1904; 122 years ago

The 5 Lexington Avenue Express is a rapid transit service in the A Division of the New York City Subway. Its route emblem, or "bullet", is colored forest green since it uses the IRT Lexington Avenue Line in Manhattan.

The 5 operates 24 hours daily, although service patterns vary based on the time of day. Weekday rush hour and midday service operates between Dyre Avenue in Eastchester, Bronx, and Flatbush Avenue–Brooklyn College in Flatbush, Brooklyn, making all stops in the Bronx and express stops in Manhattan and Brooklyn; during rush hours in the peak direction, 5 trains make express stops in the Bronx between East 180th Street and Third Avenue–149th Street. (Note: Trains run express southbound between 6:03 and 8:58 a.m. and northbound between 4:27 and 8:03 p.m.) Limited rush hour service originates and terminates either at Nereid Avenue (Note: Limited rush hour service to Manhattan and Brooklyn originates at Nereid Avenue during a.m. rush hours; service from Brooklyn and Manhattan terminates at Nereid Avenue during p.m. rush hours.) or Gun Hill Road/White Plains Road (Note: Limited a.m. midday reverse-peak service from Manhattan terminates at Gun Hill Road/White Plains Road in the northbound direction only; these trains make express stops in the Bronx.) in the Bronx instead of Dyre Avenue, as well as either at Utica (Note: A small number of rush hour trains also originate and terminate at Crown Heights–Utica Avenue, operating between the Bronx and Brooklyn.) or New Lots Avenues (Note: Limited a.m. rush hour service to Manhattan and the Bronx originates at New Lots Avenue only.) in Brooklyn instead of Flatbush Avenue. The 5 short turns at Bowling Green in the Financial District of Manhattan on weekdays during the evening and weekends during the day, and does not operate to or from Flatbush Avenue. Overnight, the 5 operates as a shuttle between Eastchester-Dyre Avenue and East 180th Street stations in the Bronx. The stations north of East 180th Street (Eastchester–Dyre Avenue, Baychester Avenue, Gun Hill Road, Pelham Parkway and Morris Park) are the only stations in the NYC Subway that lack a booth which is staffed 24 hours per day, 7 days per week.

Historically, the 5 has run south to Crown Heights–Utica Avenue or New Lots Avenue. Its northern terminal was originally Wakefield–241st Street or East 180th Street. The section between Dyre Avenue and East 180th Street, which was acquired from the defunct New York, Westchester and Boston Railway and started operating as a shuttle in 1941, was connected to the rest of the subway in 1957 and became part of the 5 in 1965. Since 1983, most trains run only to Bowling Green or Flatbush Avenue, although some rush-hour trains still run to/from Utica or New Lots Avenues. Peak service on White Plains Road was cut from 241st Street to 238th Street. During many weekends from 2017 to 2019, service ran between 241st Street and Flatbush Avenue, replacing 2 service.

== Service history ==
=== Early history ===
The section from East 180th Street to Dyre Avenue was once part of the mainline of the New York, Westchester and Boston Railway, a standard gauge electric commuter railroad built by the New York, New Haven and Hartford Railroad. Upon its closure in 1937, the entire property was put up for sale.

On December 21, 1925, the number of Manhattan-bound through trains in the morning rush hour from the White Plains Road Line was doubled with the addition of two more through trips, and service was considerably increased in the evening rush hour toward the Bronx, with through trains running every 11 minutes. In 1926, during the morning rush hour several northbound trains terminated at 86th Street.

Saturday 5 service to Crown Heights–Utica Avenue began on April 28, 1930.

As of 1934, trains normally ran from Wakefield–241st Street or East 180th Street to Atlantic Avenue. During weekday rush hours and weekend afternoons they were extended to Utica Avenue. Late-night service was not operated.

From July 24, 1938, to September 18, 1938, there was Sunday daytime 5 service to New Lots Avenue. Sunday afternoon 5 service to New Lots began on July 10, 1939.

=== 1940s through 1960s ===
==== Main service ====
On December 22, 1946, alternate Sunday morning 5 service to New Lots began. However, on March 5, 1950, 5 service was cut back to Utica Avenue all day on Sundays.

The IRT routes were given numbered designations with the introduction of "R-type" rolling stock, which contained rollsign curtains with numbered designations for each service. The first such fleet, the R12, was put into service in 1948. The Lexington–White Plains Road route became known as the 5.

Express service on the IRT White Plains Road Line began on April 23, 1953, with alternate 5 trains using the middle track between East 180th Street and 149th Street during the weekday rush in the peak direction. Starting on October 2, 1953, the express 5 trains began running express between East 180th Street and Gun Hill Road – also using the middle track – and were branded as "Thru-Express" trains in order to encourage passengers who changed at Gun Hill Road for Third Avenue Elevated service to stay on subway trains. On June 7, 1954, to speed up service, thru-expresses began skipping 138th Street, allowing for one more train per hour. On June 16, 1958, these 5 trains resumed stopping at 138th Street, with 4 trains skipping the station during rush hours.

Beginning on May 3, 1957, limited rush hour 5 service ran to Flatbush Avenue–Brooklyn College replacing the 4 service. Evening, Saturday afternoon, and Sunday trains were cut back to South Ferry.

Beginning on March 1, 1960, evening trains began making all stops in Manhattan. Beginning on April 8, 1960, weekday evening service was discontinued, as was weekday rush service to Flatbush Avenue.

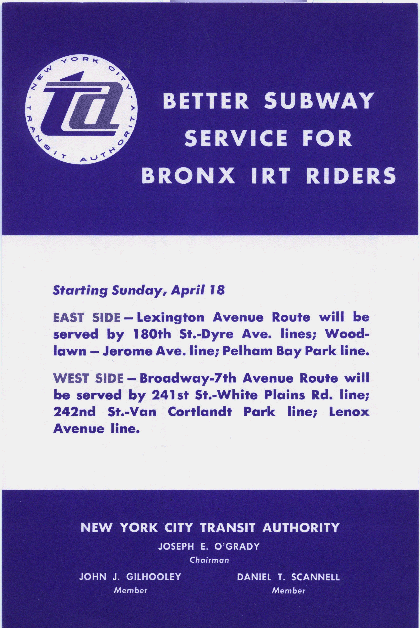
A brochure given out to passengers in anticipation of the April 18, 1965, changes to IRT service

Starting on April 18, 1965, most daytime service was rerouted to Eastchester–Dyre Avenue (see § Dyre Avenue Shuttle), replacing 2 daytime service to Dyre Avenue except evenings and late nights when shuttle service served Dyre Avenue. Some weekday rush peak-direction service to 241st Street was retained, while Saturday and Sunday evening trains were cut back from 241st Street to East 180th Street. Also, Saturday morning trains were cut back from Atlantic Avenue to South Ferry. Starting on May 3, 1965, trains to or from 241st Street began making all stops between Gun Hill Road and East 180th Street.

==== Dyre Avenue Shuttle ====
In 1940, the City of New York purchased the New York, Westchester and Boston Railway, and began integrating the line into the system. Plans were made for restoring the old line north into Westchester County, but ultimately failed, and the superfluous track and overhead catenary on the old NYW&B were scrapped by 1943. The section below East 180th Street to Greens Farm Junction was once used to interchange with the New Haven (and later Penn Central and Conrail) to bring subway cars and other equipment on and off the system. That section was removed in the 1970s, isolating this part of the subway from the interchange.

On May 15, 1941, the East 180th Street–Dyre Avenue Shuttle or Dyre Avenue Shuttle was established as a new subway service and full-time shuttle between the former East 180th Street station of the New York, Westchester and Boston Railway and Eastchester–Dyre Avenue, the northernmost station on the NYW&B within New York City. There was a paper transfer to the IRT White Plains Road Line at East 180th Street, since there were no track connections between the lines. The shuttle was run with trains consisting of two cars, and there was no late night service when the line opened in 1941. The fares were collected in the stations during rush hours, and by conductors on the trains when ridership was light.

In 1957, a flyover connection opened between the East 180th Street station of the White Plains Road Line and the Dyre Avenue Line, enabling through service by trains from the 2 route from Manhattan to Dyre Avenue. At the same time, the former NYW&B station was closed and the off-hours Dyre Avenue Shuttle rerouted to the White Plains Road Line station. These shuttles were initially labeled 2 like the full-time service but were later signed as 9. Effective April 18, 1965, the Dyre Avenue Line was instead served by 5 trains at all times. The line is still operated as a shuttle late nights, labeled as part of the 5 route.

=== 1970s and 1980s ===
Beginning on May 23, 1976, 5 service began starting late on Sunday mornings. As of May 24, 1976, weekday midday 5 service from 10:30 a.m. to 3:30 p.m. was cut back to Bowling Green from Atlantic Avenue.

On October 26, 1978, the NYCTA presented a plan to Bronx Community Board 12 to have all rush hour peak-direction thru-expresses from the White Plains Road Line run express between Gun Hill Road and East 180th Street, and to have all trains from Dyre Avenue run express in the Bronx. The changes were expected to be implemented in 12 to 19 months.

In 1979, with the color coding of subway routes based on their trunk line in Manhattan, the 5 service's color was changed to forest green, as it goes via the Lexington Avenue Line in Manhattan. On January 13, 1980, all 5 service to/from Dyre Avenue and Wakefield–241st Street during rush hours in the peak direction began running express in the Bronx. 5 service was re-extended to Atlantic Avenue on May 15, 1980.

On July 10, 1983, rush hour 5 trains were rerouted from Utica Avenue to Flatbush Avenue with limited service to/from Utica Avenue or New Lots Avenue. Beginning on January 18, 1988, all midday 5 service was cut back to Bowling Green, to allow 4 service to operate to Utica.

=== 1990s ===
In Spring 1995, rush hour service to 241st Street was cut back to Nereid Avenue. 241st Street had insufficient capacity to terminate all 2 and 5 trains during rush hours, requiring some 2 and 5 trips to terminate at Nereid Avenue. To ease passenger confusion regarding which trips terminate where and to provide more reliable service, it was decided to have all 2 trips terminate at 241st Street and have all 5 trains terminate at 238th Street. In addition, the span of 5 peak period Bronx express service to Dyre Avenue was expanded by 45 minutes in each rush hour. These two recommendations were made in response to comments made as part of the Northeast Bronx Comprehensive Study. New York City Transit decided against operating all 5 trains via the Dyre Avenue Line because it would reduce the attractiveness of the White Plains Road Line north of East 180th Street as it would force passengers using the Lexington Avenue Line to transfer at East 180th Street. However, this would have simplified operations.

On December 9, 1999, New York City Transit released a proposal revising 2 and 5 service in the Bronx to eliminate a merge north of the East 180th Street station, increasing capacity and reducing delays, to the Metropolitan Transportation Authority (MTA) Board. Dyre Avenue-bound 5 trains would start running local along the White Plains Road Line at all times except late nights, while 2 trains would by rerouted via express in the rush hour peak way direction. The limited Rush Hour Nereid Avenue-bound 5 trains would remain express in the Bronx however. As part of the change, the frequency of service at White Plains Road Line local station would decrease from 12 trains per hour to 7 trains per hour. Market research showed that riders at these stations preferred Lexington Avenue Line service. In addition, riders on the line north of East 180th Street would gain express service. This change would have been revenue neutral.

Shortly after the proposal was more widely announced in April 2000, Assemblyman Jeffrey Klein collected 2,000 signatures for a petition opposing the change. The MTA delayed the change's planned implementation by a month after receiving the petition. Opponents of the change argued that the loss of express service would’ve made commute times on the Dyre Avenue line longer with an increase by up to 15-20 minutes and increased crowding on the route from the additional crowds on the local stations. Critics also argued that it would have increased subway crowding on the 2 train, especially at the 72nd Street station on the IRT Broadway–Seventh Avenue Line as well as at East 180th Street and 3rd Avenue 149th Street from crowds transferring for express service. The change was also opposed by State Senator Eric Schneiderman, Assemblyman Scott Stringer, and Public Advocate Mark Green. New York City Transit expected the passenger volume of downtown 2 trains in the morning rush hour to increase from 92% of capacity to 108% at 72nd Street. After Assembly Speaker Sheldon Silver put pressure on the MTA, the change was pushed back for an additional three months in May 2000. On September 24, 2000, a spokesperson for New York City Transit said that MTA Chairman E. Virgil Conway told planners to drop the change until service on the 5 was increased with the arrival of new R142 subway cars by early 2002; the swap proposal was canceled the next day.

On May 28, 2000, the headway of Dyre Avenue shuttles between 2 a.m. and 4 a.m. was decreased from 40 minutes to 20 minutes.

=== Recent history ===
After the September 11, 2001 attacks, 5 service initially operated as a shuttle between Dyre Avenue and East 180th Street, but service was restored along the full route by the evening of September 12, with trains skipping 14th Street–Union Square in both directions. By September 17, trains were only skipping Wall Street, which reopened on the evening of September 19.

On May 27, 2005, use of the 5 diamond to indicate peak direction service to Nereid Avenue was discontinued.

From August 7 to November 10, 2006, limited rush hour service originated and terminated at 241st Street instead of Nereid Avenue. Station improvements taking place at Nereid Avenue temporarily closed the station, preventing 5 trains from using it as a terminal.

On June 29, 2009, 5 trains were extended from Bowling Green to Flatbush Avenue during midday hours, from 10:30 a.m. to 3 p.m., following a successful pilot run in fall 2008.

From March 29 to September 3, 2010, rush hour peak direction 5 express service was suspended due to rehabilitation of East 180th Street and signal replacements along the IRT White Plains Road Line. PM northbound express service was suspended again on March 28, 2011, to allow for the second phase of the signal replacement project. This time, service was restored on August 8.

Due to repairs to Hurricane Sandy-related damage in the Clark Street Tunnel, which carries the IRT Broadway–Seventh Avenue Line into Brooklyn, the 5 was extended to Flatbush Avenue on weekends between June 17, 2017, and June 23, 2018, running local in Brooklyn. In the Bronx, the 5 ran to 241st Street instead of Dyre Avenue in place of the 2.

On November 17, 2019, New York City Transit made adjustments to weekday evening 3, 4, and 5 service in order to accommodate planned subway work. 5 service between Dyre Avenue and Bowling Green was reduced by one hour, from 11 p.m. to 10 p.m., with Dyre Avenue Shuttle service beginning an hour earlier. This change, which was approved by the MTA Board on June 27, 2019, was expected to save the agency $900,000 annually. In addition, on this date, morning rush hour reverse-peak 5 trains that terminated at 241st Street began terminating at Gun Hill Road/White Plains Road, making express stops north of East 180th Street.

In May 2025, as part of the 2025–2029 Capital Program, the MTA proposed that the 5 train be rerouted from Flatbush Avenue to New Lots Avenue at its southern end. The 5 would be rerouted along the IRT New Lots Line, sharing that route with a new 8 service that would operate along the Broadway–Seventh Avenue Line, while the 3 would take over the 5's routing to Flatbush Avenue. The proposal, first suggested in 2023 as part of the MTA's 20-year needs assessment, would remove a bottleneck at the Rogers Avenue Junction south of Franklin Avenue, where 5 express and 3 local trains must cross over each other's tracks.

== Route ==
=== Signage history ===
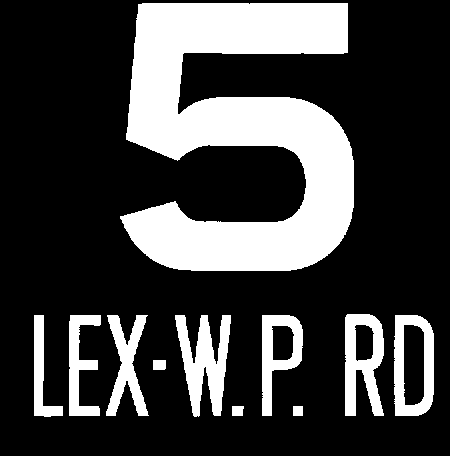
Pre-1967 bullet used on the R12s to R36s

1967–1979 bullet

1979–2005 rush-hour bullet

Bullet used since 1979

=== Service pattern ===
The following table shows the lines used by the 5, with shaded boxes indicating the route at the specified times:

| Line | From | To | Tracks | Times | | | | |
| Line | From | To | Tracks | weekdays | eves & weekends | late nights | rush peak | rush reverse peak |
|---|---|---|---|---|---|---|---|---|
| IRT Dyre Avenue Line (full line) | Eastchester–Dyre Avenue | Morris Park | all | | | | Most trains | Most trains |
| IRT White Plains Road Line | Nereid Avenue | 219th Street | local | —N/a | —N/a | —N/a | Limited service | —N/a |
| IRT White Plains Road Line | Gun Hill Road | Bronx Park East | local | —N/a | —N/a | —N/a | Limited service | —N/a |
| IRT White Plains Road Line | Gun Hill Road | Bronx Park East | express | —N/a | —N/a | —N/a | —N/a | Very limited service |
| IRT White Plains Road Line | East 180th Street | | all | | | | | |
| IRT White Plains Road Line | West Farms Square–East Tremont Avenue | Jackson Avenue | local | | | | Very limited service | Most trains |
| IRT White Plains Road Line | West Farms Square–East Tremont Avenue | Jackson Avenue | express | | | | Most trains | Very limited service |
| IRT White Plains Road Line | Third Avenue–149th Street | 149th Street–Hostos | all | | | | | |
| IRT Jerome Avenue Line | 138th Street–Grand Concourse | | local | | | | | |
| IRT Lexington Avenue Line (full line) | 125th Street | Brooklyn Bridge–City Hall | express | | | | | |
| IRT Lexington Avenue Line (full line) | Fulton Street | Bowling Green | all | | | | | |
| Joralemon Street Tunnel | | | all | | | | | |
| IRT Eastern Parkway Line | Borough Hall | Franklin Avenue–Medgar Evers College | express | | | | | |
| IRT Nostrand Avenue Line (full line) | President Street–Medgar Evers College | Flatbush Avenue–Brooklyn College | all | | | | Most trains | Most trains |
| IRT Eastern Parkway Line | Franklin Avenue–Medgar Evers College | Crown Heights–Utica Avenue | express | —N/a | —N/a | —N/a | Limited service | Very limited service |
| IRT Eastern Parkway Line | Franklin Avenue–Medgar Evers College | Crown Heights–Utica Avenue | local | —N/a | —N/a | —N/a | Very limited service | —N/a |
| IRT New Lots Line (full line) | Sutter Avenue–Rutland Road | New Lots Avenue | all | —N/a | —N/a | —N/a | Very limited service | —N/a |

=== Stations ===
For a more detailed station listing, see the articles on the lines listed above.

Station service legend
| Stops all times | Stops 24 hours a day |
| Stops all times except late nights | Stops every day during daytime hours only |
| Stops weekdays during the day | Stops during weekday daytime hours only |
| Stops daily except rush hours in the peak direction | Stops every day during daytime hours, except during weekday rush hours in the peak direction |
| Stops rush hours only | Stops during weekday rush hours only |
| Stops rush hours in the reverse-peak direction only | Stops during weekday rush hours in the reverse peak direction only |
| Station closed | Station closed |
| Stops rush hours in the peak direction only | Stops rush hours/weekdays in the peak direction only (including limited service) |
Time period details
| Disabled access | Station is compliant with the Americans with Disabilities Act |
| ↑ | Station is compliant with the Americans with Disabilities Act in the indicated direction only |
| ↓ | Station is compliant with the Americans with Disabilities Act in the indicated direction only |
| | Elevator access to mezzanine only |

| Dyre | Ner. | GHR | 180th | Stations | Disabled access | Subway transfers | Connections |
|---|---|---|---|---|---|---|---|
The Bronx
Dyre Avenue Line
| Stops all times | —N/a | —N/a | —N/a | Eastchester–Dyre Avenue | | | |
| Stops all times | —N/a | —N/a | —N/a | Baychester Avenue | | | |
| Stops all times | —N/a | —N/a | —N/a | Gun Hill Road | Disabled access | | |
| Stops all times | —N/a | —N/a | —N/a | Pelham Parkway | | | Bx12 Select Bus Service |
| Stops all times | —N/a | —N/a | —N/a | Morris Park | | | |
White Plains Road Line (peak-direction rush hour trips and limited reverse-peak midday trips only)
| —N/a | Stops rush hours in the peak direction only | —N/a | —N/a | Nereid Avenue | | 2 | Northern terminal for most rush hour peak direction trips to/from Manhattan and Brooklyn |
| —N/a | Stops rush hours in the peak direction only | —N/a | —N/a | 233rd Street | Disabled access | 2 | Metro-North Railroad Harlem Line at Woodlawn |
| —N/a | Stops rush hours in the peak direction only | —N/a | —N/a | 225th Street | | 2 | |
| —N/a | Stops rush hours in the peak direction only | —N/a | —N/a | 219th Street | | 2 | |
| —N/a | Stops rush hours in the peak direction only | ↑ | —N/a | Gun Hill Road | Disabled access | 2 | Bx41 Select Bus Service; Metro-North Railroad Harlem Line at Williams Bridge; Northern terminal for limited a.m. rush hour service in the northbound direction only |
| —N/a | Stops rush hours in the peak direction only | | | —N/a | Burke Avenue | | 2 | |
| —N/a | Stops rush hours in the peak direction only | | | —N/a | Allerton Avenue | | 2 | |
| —N/a | Stops rush hours in the peak direction only | | | —N/a | Pelham Parkway | Disabled access | 2 | Bx12 Select Bus Service |
| —N/a | Stops rush hours in the peak direction only | | | —N/a | Bronx Park East | | 2 | |
Services to Eastchester–Dyre Avenue and Nereid Avenue split
| Stops all times | Stops rush hours in the peak direction only | ↑ | ↑ | East 180th Street | Disabled access | 2 | Some southbound rush hour trips begin at this station Some northbound a.m. rush hour trips terminate at this station Southern terminal for late night service |
| Stops daily except rush hours in the peak direction | | | | | | | West Farms Square–East Tremont Avenue | | 2 | Q44 Select Bus Service |
| Stops daily except rush hours in the peak direction | | | | | | | 174th Street | | 2 | |
| Stops daily except rush hours in the peak direction | | | | | | | Freeman Street | | 2 | |
| Stops daily except rush hours in the peak direction | | | | | | | Simpson Street | Disabled access | 2 | |
| Stops daily except rush hours in the peak direction | | | | | | | Intervale Avenue | | 2 | Bx6 Select Bus Service |
| Stops daily except rush hours in the peak direction | | | | | | | Prospect Avenue | | 2 | |
| Stops daily except rush hours in the peak direction | | | | | | | Jackson Avenue | | 2 | |
| Stops all times except late nights | Stops rush hours in the peak direction only | ↑ | ↑ | Third Avenue–149th Street | Disabled access | 2 | Bx41 Select Bus Service |
| Stops all times except late nights | Stops rush hours in the peak direction only | ↑ | ↑ | 149th Street–Hostos | Disabled access | 2; 4 (IRT Jerome Avenue Line) | |
Jerome Avenue Line
| Stops all times except late nights | Stops rush hours in the peak direction only | ↑ | ↑ | 138th Street–Grand Concourse | | 4 | |
Manhattan
Lexington Avenue Line
| Stops all times except late nights | Stops rush hours in the peak direction only | ↑ | ↑ | 125th Street | Disabled access | 4 6 <6> | Metro-North Railroad at Harlem–125th Street; M60 Select Bus Service to LaGuardia Airport |
| Stops all times except late nights | Stops rush hours in the peak direction only | ↑ | ↑ | 86th Street | ↑ | 4 6 <6> | M86 Select Bus Service |
| Stops all times except late nights | Stops rush hours in the peak direction only | ↑ | ↑ | 59th Street | | 4 6 <6> N R W (BMT Broadway Line at Lexington Avenue/59th Street); Out-of-system transfer with MetroCard/OMNY: F M N Q R (63rd Street Lines at Lexington Avenue–63rd Street) | Roosevelt Island Tramway |
| Stops all times except late nights | Stops rush hours in the peak direction only | ↑ | ↑ | Grand Central–42nd Street | Disabled access | 4 6 <6> 7 <7> (IRT Flushing Line); S (42nd Street Shuttle) | Metro-North Railroad at Grand Central Terminal; Long Island Rail Road at Grand Central Madison |
| Stops all times except late nights | Stops rush hours in the peak direction only | ↑ | ↑ | 14th Street–Union Square | Elevator access to mezzanine only | 4 6 <6> L (BMT Canarsie Line); N Q R W (BMT Broadway Line) | M14A / M14D Select Bus Service |
| Stops all times except late nights | Stops rush hours in the peak direction only | ↑ | ↑ | Brooklyn Bridge–City Hall | Disabled access | 4 6 <6> J Z (BMT Nassau Street Line at Chambers Street) | |
| Stops all times except late nights | Stops rush hours in the peak direction only | ↑ | ↑ | Fulton Street | Disabled access | 4; 2 3 (IRT Broadway–Seventh Avenue Line); A C (IND Eighth Avenue Line); J Z (BMT Nassau Street Line) | Connection to N R W (BMT Broadway Line) at Cortlandt Street via Dey Street Passageway; PATH at World Trade Center |
| Stops all times except late nights | Stops rush hours in the peak direction only | ↑ | ↑ | Wall Street | | 4 | |
| Stops all times except late nights | Stops rush hours in the peak direction only | ↑ | ↑ | Bowling Green | Disabled access | 4 | M15 Select Bus Service Staten Island Ferry at Whitehall Terminal; Southern terminal for evening and weekend service, as well as some rush hour service |
Brooklyn
Eastern Parkway Line
| Stops weekdays during the day | Stops rush hours in the peak direction only | —N/a | ↑ | Borough Hall | Disabled access | 4; 2 3 (IRT Broadway–Seventh Avenue Line); R W (BMT Fourth Avenue Line at Court Street) | |
| Stops weekdays during the day | Stops rush hours in the peak direction only | —N/a | ↑ | Nevins Street | | 2 3 4 | |
| Stops weekdays during the day | Stops rush hours in the peak direction only | —N/a | ↑ | Atlantic Avenue–Barclays Center | Disabled access | 2 3 4 B Q (BMT Brighton Line); D N R W (BMT Fourth Avenue Line) | LIRR Atlantic Branch at Atlantic Terminal |
| Stops weekdays during the day | Stops rush hours in the peak direction only | —N/a | ↑ | Franklin Avenue–Medgar Evers College | | 2 3 4 S (BMT Franklin Avenue Line at Botanic Garden) | |
Services to Flatbush Avenue and New Lots Avenue split
Nostrand Avenue Line
| Stops weekdays during the day | Stops rush hours in the peak direction only | —N/a | —N/a | President Street–Medgar Evers College | | 2 | |
| Stops weekdays during the day | Stops rush hours in the peak direction only | —N/a | —N/a | Sterling Street | | 2 | B44 Select Bus Service |
| Stops weekdays during the day | Stops rush hours in the peak direction only | —N/a | —N/a | Winthrop Street | | 2 | B44 Select Bus Service |
| Stops weekdays during the day | Stops rush hours in the peak direction only | —N/a | —N/a | Church Avenue | Disabled access | 2 | B44 Select Bus Service |
| Stops weekdays during the day | Stops rush hours in the peak direction only | —N/a | —N/a | Beverly Road | | 2 | |
| Stops weekdays during the day | Stops rush hours in the peak direction only | —N/a | —N/a | Newkirk Avenue–Little Haiti | | 2 | B44 Select Bus Service |
| Stops weekdays during the day | Stops rush hours in the peak direction only | —N/a | —N/a | Flatbush Avenue–Brooklyn College | Disabled access | 2 | B44 Select Bus Service |
Eastern Parkway Line (limited rush hour service only)
| ↑ | | | —N/a | | | Nostrand Avenue | | 2 3 4 | One a.m. rush-hour train to the Bronx stops here |
| ↑ | | | —N/a | | | Kingston Avenue | | 2 3 4 | One a.m. rush-hour train to the Bronx stops here |
| Stops rush hours only (limited service) | Stops rush hours in the peak direction only (limited service) | —N/a | ↑ | Crown Heights–Utica Avenue | Disabled access | 2 3 4 | B46 Select Bus Service; Southern terminal for some rush hour service |
New Lots Line (limited rush hour service only)
| ↑ | —N/a | —N/a | —N/a | Sutter Avenue–Rutland Road | | 2 3 4 | B15 bus to JFK Int'l Airport |
| ↑ | —N/a | —N/a | —N/a | Saratoga Avenue | | 2 3 4 | |
| ↑ | —N/a | —N/a | —N/a | Rockaway Avenue | | 2 3 4 | |
| ↑ | —N/a | —N/a | —N/a | Junius Street | | 2 3 4 Out-of-system transfer with MetroCard/OMNY: L (BMT Canarsie Line at Livonia Avenue) | |
| ↑ | —N/a | —N/a | —N/a | Pennsylvania Avenue | | 2 3 4 | |
| ↑ | —N/a | —N/a | —N/a | Van Siclen Avenue | | 2 3 4 | |
| ↑ | —N/a | —N/a | —N/a | New Lots Avenue | | 2 3 4 | B15 bus to JFK Int'l Airport; Southern terminal for some northbound a.m. rush hour service |
