= 225th Street station =

New York City Subway station in the Bronx

225 Street
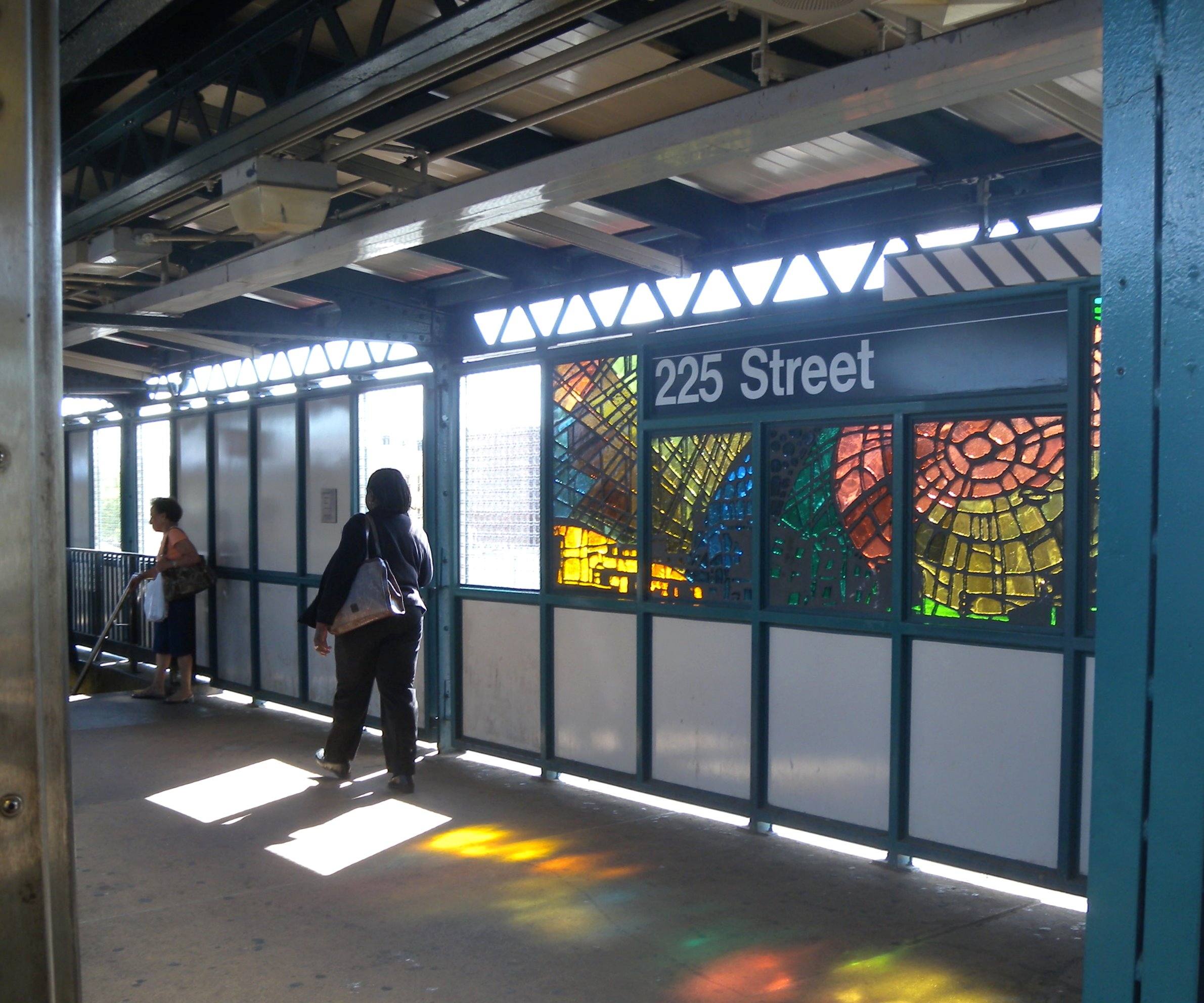
- Southbound platform

Station statistics
- Address: East 225th Street & White Plains Road; Bronx, New York
- Borough: The Bronx
- Locale: Wakefield
- Coordinates: 40.888°N 73.86°W
- Division: A (IRT)
- Line: IRT White Plains Road Line
- Services: 2 (all times); 5 (limited weekday rush hour service in the peak direction)
- Transit: NYCT Bus: Bx8, Bx39; MTA Bus: BxM11
- Structure: Elevated
- Platforms: 2 side platforms
- Tracks: 3 (2 in regular service)

Other information
- Opened: March 31, 1917; 109 years ago

Traffic
- 2025: 630,098 ▲14.2%
- Rank: 367 out of 423
Services
Preceding station	New York City Subway	Following station
233rd Street 2 5 toward Wakefield–241st Street	Local	219th Street 2 5 toward Flatbush Avenue–Brooklyn College
Location
Location within New York City Subway
Location within New York City
Location within New York
Track layout
Street map
Station service legend
Symbol	Description
Stops all times	Stops all times
Stops rush hours in the peak direction only	Stops rush hours in the peak direction only

The 225th Street station is a local station on the IRT White Plains Road Line of the New York City Subway. Located at the intersection of 225th Street and White Plains Road in the Wakefield neighborhood of the Bronx, it is served by the 2 train at all times and by the 5 train during rush hours in the peak direction.

== History ==
This station was built under the Dual Contracts. On March 3, 1917, the IRT White Plains Road Line was extended from East 177th Street–East Tremont Avenue to East 219th Street–White Plains Road, providing the Bronx communities of Williamsbridge and Wakefield with access to rapid transit service. Service was initially operated as a four-car shuttle from 177th Street due to the power conditions at the time. An extension to Nereid Avenue, including the 225th Street and 233rd Street stations, finally opened on March 31, 1917. The city government took over the IRT's operations on June 12, 1940.

It was renovated in fall 2005 at a cost of $13.23 million.

== Station layout ==
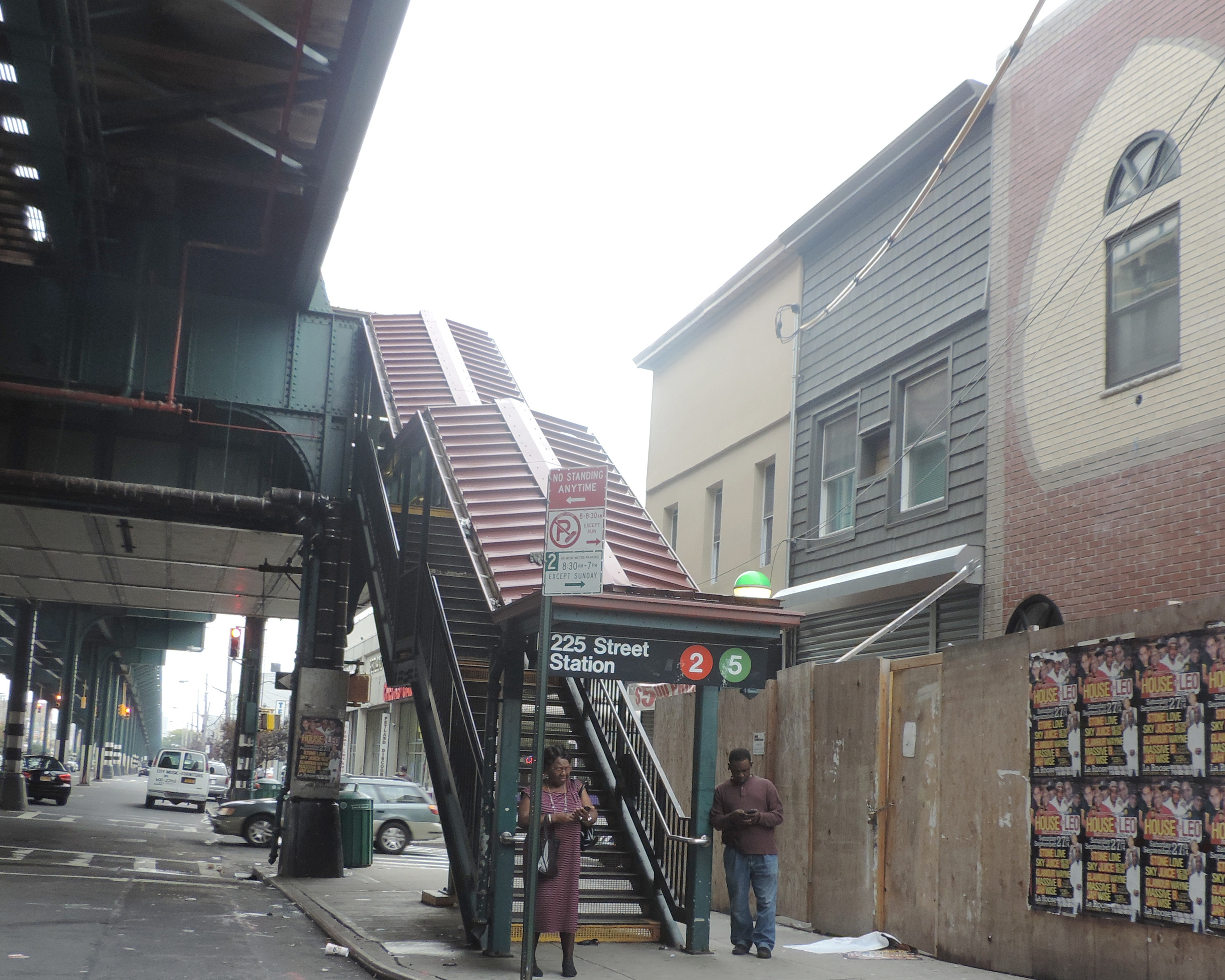
Street stair

This elevated station has three tracks and two side platforms. The center track is normally not used in revenue service. Both platforms have beige windscreens and red canopies with green outlines, frames, and support columns in the center and black, waist-high steel fences at either ends with lampposts at regular intervals. The windscreens have mesh fences at various points. The station signs are in the standard white lettering on black name plates.

The 2006 artwork here is called Universal City by Nicky Enright. It consists of stained glass windows on the platform windscreens depicting images related to astronomy, including constellations, shooting stars, orbiting planets, and moons.

=== Exits ===
This station has one elevated station house beneath the center of the platforms and tracks. Two staircases from each platform go down to a waiting area. The back of the token booth faces the crossunder with steel fences on either side. On the Wakefield-bound side, there are two exit only turnstiles. On the Manhattan-bound side, there is an emergency gate and a bank of three turnstiles. Outside fare control, two staircases go down to the northwest and southeast corners of 225th Street and White Plains Road. The station house has glass windows.
