= White Plains Road =

Street in the Bronx, New York

Coordinates: 40°51′22.81″N 73°52′3.46″W

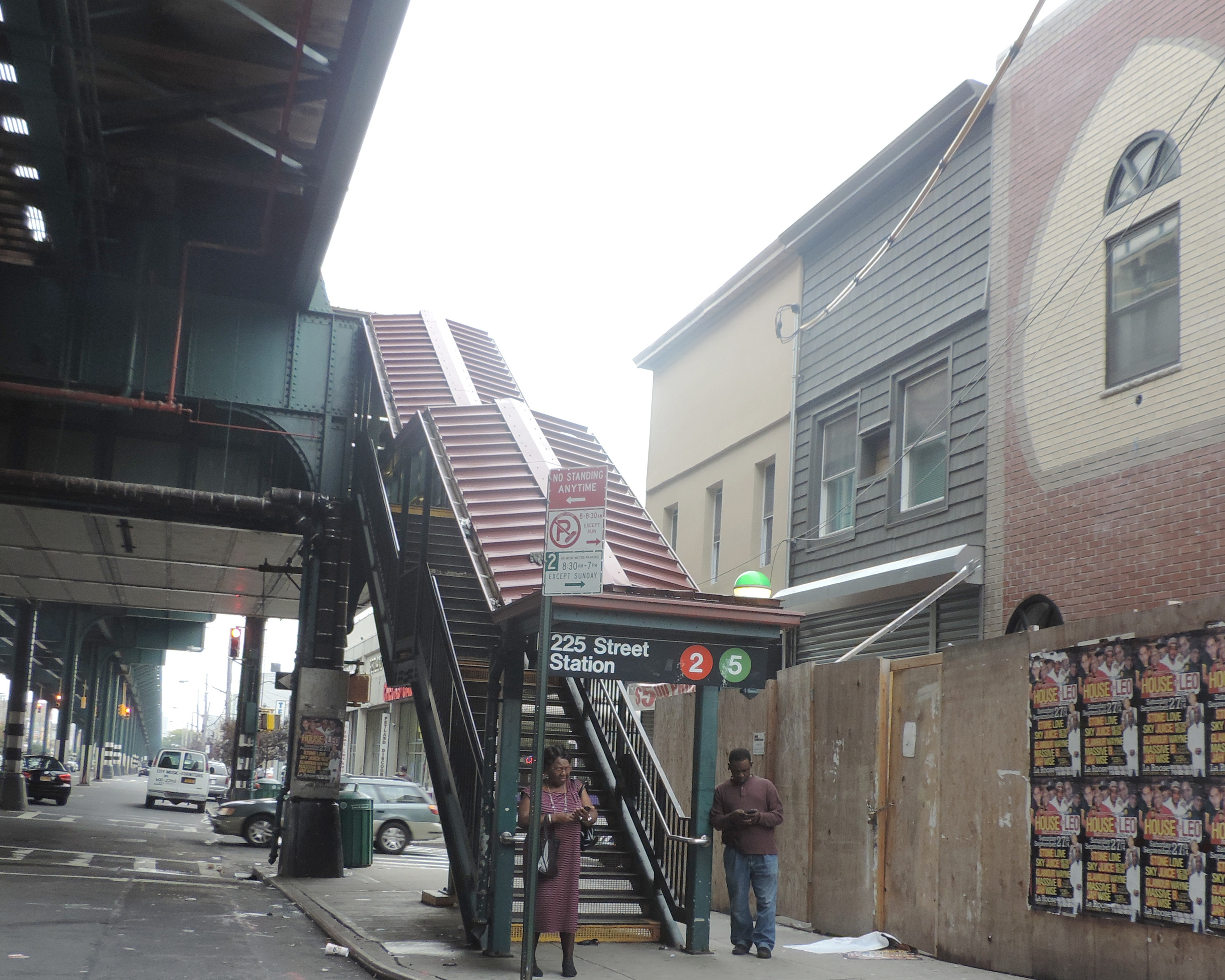
- White Plains Road at 225th Street station
- Owner: City of New York
- Maintained by: NYCDOT
- Length: 7.3 mi (11.7 km)
- Location: Bronx, New York City
- South end: Bronx River Avenue in Clason Point
- Major junctions: I-278 in Soundview; I-95 in Parkchester; Pelham Parkway in Pelham Parkway; US 1 in Pelham Parkway
- North end: East 243rd Street in Wakefield

White Plains Road is a major north–south thoroughfare which runs the length of the New York City borough of the Bronx. It runs from Castle Hill and Clason Point in the south to Wakefield in the north, where it crosses the city line and becomes West 1st Street of Mount Vernon, New York. The Bronx River Parkway lies to its west and parallels much of its route. Between Magenta Street & 217th Street, White Plains Road is very wide due to the presence of the Gun Hill Road station house in the road's median.

Historically, the route ran through an alignment through Mount Vernon by way of modern First Street, Lincoln Avenue (and Clinton Street), where it continued along modern North Columbus Ave. The route further continued with the current alignment Hussey Road across the Cross County Parkway, merging again with current North Columbus Avenue (modern NY 22-Columbus Avenue was known as "Central Blvd" into the 1960s between current Hussey Road and the Cross County Parkway, as the rebuilding of the parkway severed the old alignment of NY 22). These roads acquired their modern names around the end of the 19th century. Today at the Bronxville Village line, White Plains Road continues as New York State Route 22 (NY 22), to Broadway in White Plains where it terminates as Post Road.

== Transportation ==
North of Birchall Avenue in Van Nest, White Plains Road runs below the IRT White Plains Road Line (2 and 5 trains) of the New York City Subway, to that line's terminus, Wakefield–241st Street station.

The following bus routes run on the corridor:

- The Bx39 is White Plains Road's primary route, serving the road between 241st Street and Soundview Avenue. Wakefield service leaves at Nereid Avenue, and Clason Point service is absent from Patterson to O’Brien Avenues.
- The Bx22 serves between Unionport Road and Bronx Park East.
- North of Lafayette Avenue, the Bx36 serves until East Tremont Avenue, and the Bx5 until Story Avenue, with some buses running to/from the Turnbull Avenue Shopping Center.
- The Bx27 runs on the section of White Plains that interferes with Soundview Avenue.
- The Locust Point-bound Bx8 runs from East 226th to East 222nd Streets.
- The Bx41 local & Select Bus Service run the exclusive u-turn lane at Gun Hill Road in Williamsbridge to change direction to the Hub.
- The Pelham Parkway-bound Bx30 terminates at the intersection with White Plains, then goes out of service to Boston Road and turns right to begin Co-Op City service at Thwaites Place.
- Express service is provided by the BxM11 north of Boston Road, running the same service pattern as the Bx39.
- The Metropolitan Oval-bound BxM6 runs non-stop from the Cross Bronx Expressway to Westchester Avenue.
- Under Westchester's Bee-Line Bus System, routes 40, 41, and 43 serve the road north of East 241st Street, and route 42 north of East 236th Street, with Bronx trips extended to East 233rd Street.
