= Wakefield–241st Street station =

New York City Subway station in the Bronx

Wakefield–241 Street
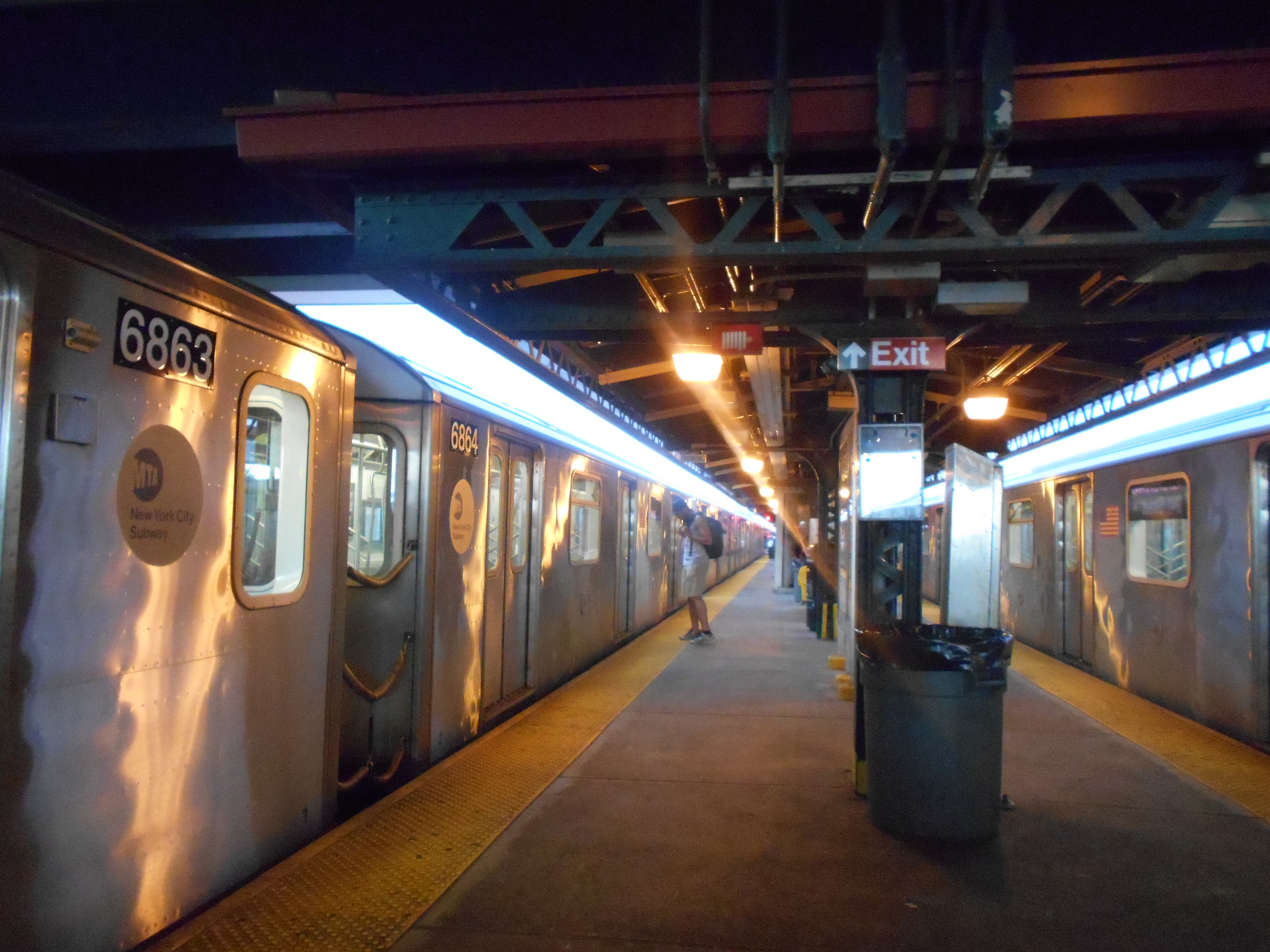

Station statistics
- Address: East 241st Street & White Plains Road; Bronx, New York
- Borough: The Bronx
- Locale: Wakefield
- Coordinates: 40°54′12″N 73°51′2″W
- Division: A (IRT)
- Line: IRT White Plains Road Line
- Services: 2 (all times)
- Transit: NYCT Bus: Bx39; MTA Bus: BxM11; Bee-Line Bus: 40, 41, 42, 43; Metro-North: Harlem Line (at Wakefield)
- Structure: Elevated
- Platforms: 1 island platform (in service); 2 side platforms (unused); Spanish solution
- Tracks: 2

Other information
- Opened: December 13, 1920; 105 years ago
- Accessible: No; under construction
- Former/other names: 241 Street (used on entrances and platform signs); East 241 Street; Becker Avenue

Traffic
- 2025: 828,113 ▲6.3%
- Rank: 338 out of 423
Services
Preceding station	New York City Subway	Following station
Terminus	Local	Nereid Avenue toward Flatbush Avenue–Brooklyn College
Non-revenue services and lines
Preceding station	New York City Subway	Following station
Terminus	no service	Gun Hill Road express
Location
Location within New York City Subway
Location within New York City
Location within New York
Track layout
Street map
Station service legend
Symbol	Description
Stops all times	Stops all times
Stops rush hours in the peak direction only	Stops rush hours in the peak direction only
Stops weekdays and weekday late nights	Stops weekdays and weekday late nights
Stops weekends and weekend late nights	Stops weekends and weekend late nights

The Wakefield–241st Street station (signed as 241st Street) is a terminal station on the IRT White Plains Road Line of the New York City Subway. Located at the intersection of 241st Street and White Plains Road in the Wakefield neighborhood of the Bronx, it is served by the 2 train at all times. This station is geographically the northernmost station in the entire New York City Subway system.

== History ==
The station officially opened on December 13, 1920, as East 241st Street, when the final portion of the line was opened. The line had been extended one stop north from East 238th Street. This portion of the line had its opening delayed, owing to construction on the line between the two stations for the construction of the 239th Street Yard. Additional time was required to modify the structure to avoid a grade crossing at the entrance to the yard. The city government took over the IRT's operations on June 12, 1940.

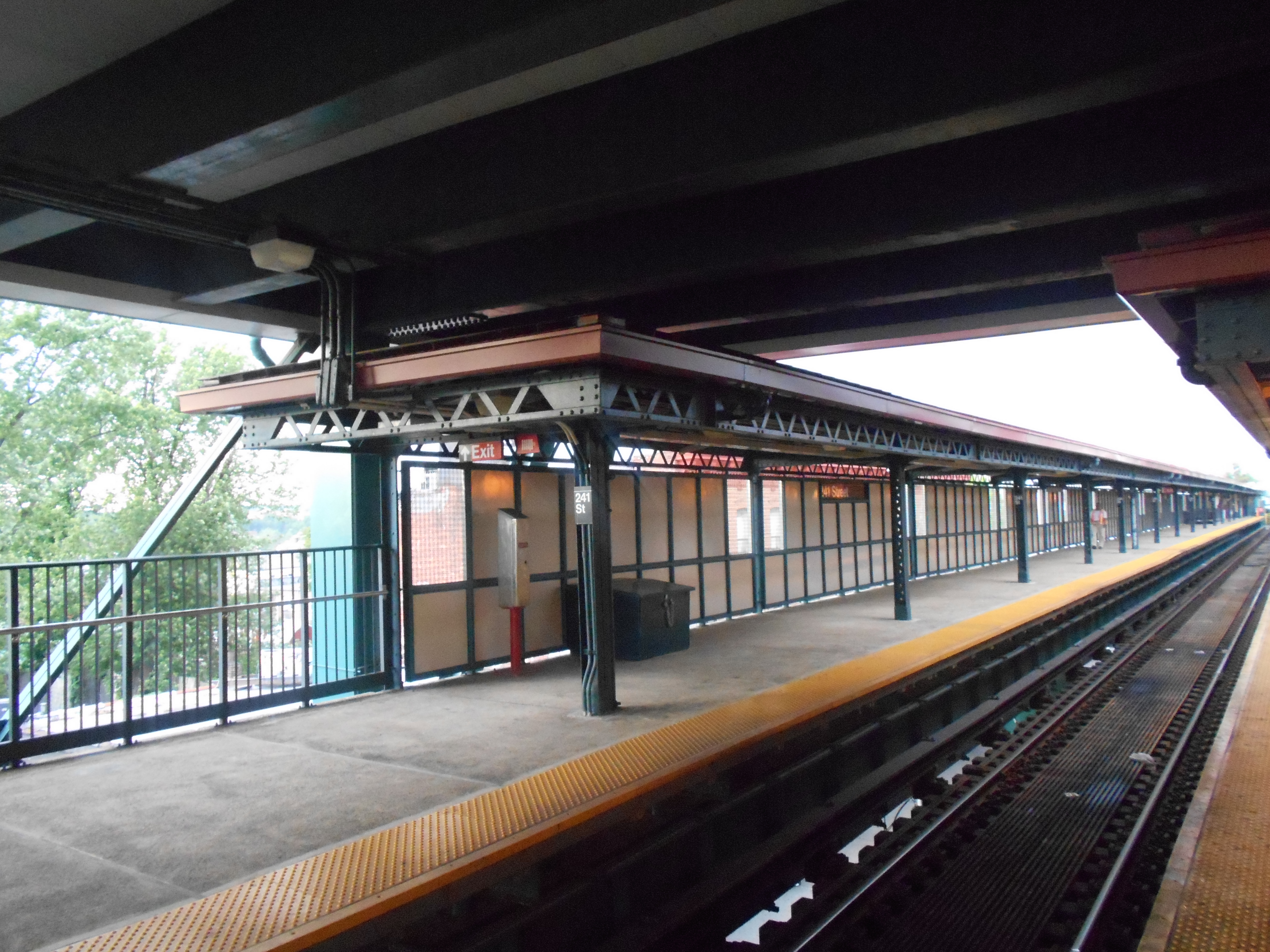
One of the side platforms

The station was renovated from July to December 2005 at a cost of $17.25 million. The station, as part of the renovation, got a new high-quality public address system, new platform edge and ADA tactile warning strips, major structural repairs, new canopies over the stairs and platforms, repaired walls, renewed floors, and a redesign of the area around the station booth.

In 2019, the Metropolitan Transportation Authority announced that this station would become ADA-accessible as part of the agency's 2020–2024 Capital Program. In May 2024, the Federal Transit Administration awarded the MTA $157 million for accessibility renovations at five stations, including Wakefield–241st Street. The funds would be used to add elevators, signs, and public-announcement systems, as well as repair platforms and stairs, at each station.

=== Names ===
This terminal station has gone by a number of different names. Becker Avenue was an earlier name for the station at the time of its construction, and it officially opened as East 241st Street on December 13, 1920. By 1984, it was renamed 241st Street on entrances and platform signs.

The station was initially signed on the New York City Subway map as 241st Street–Wakefield. It has been signed on the map under its current name since 1998.

== Station layout ==
At this station, there are two tracks, one center island platform and two disused side platforms here. The two tracks end at bumper blocks at the north end of the platforms. The station was formerly set up as a Spanish solution with alighting passengers using the side platforms and boarding passengers using the island platform. Now all passengers use the island platform.

The middle of the platform features a backlit track departure sign labeled Tracks 3 and 2, indicating which train leaves first. There are also crew quarters at platform level.

To the south of the station, the tracks make a connection to the 239th Street Yard before splitting into three tracks. Just three blocks north of the station on White Plains Road lies the border between The Bronx and Westchester.

The 2006 artwork featured at the station is Permanent Residents and Visitors by Alfredo Ceibal, which focuses on birds living in and visiting the city. The artwork is made of faceted glass in the platform windscreens.

=== Exits ===
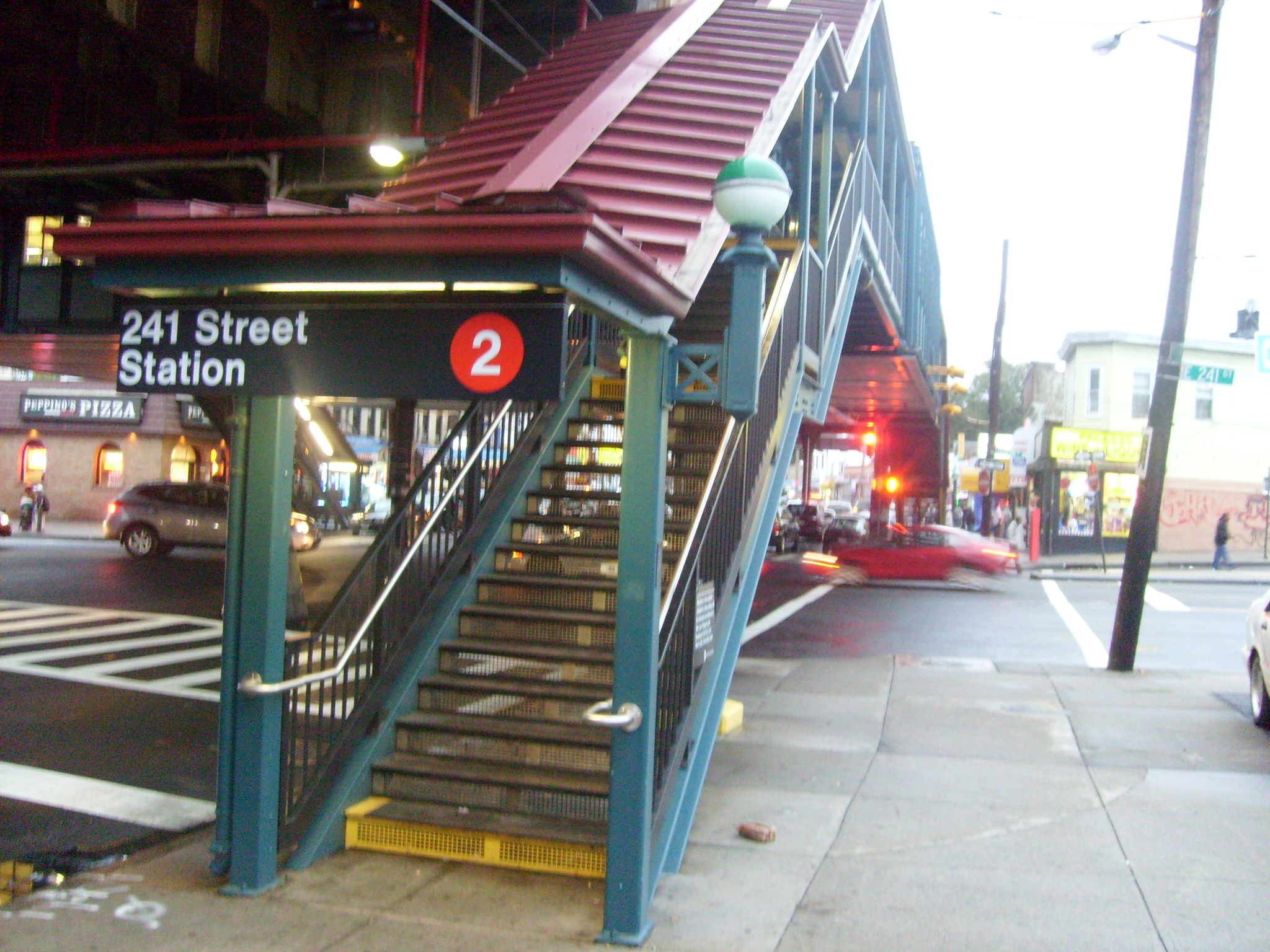
The southeast entrance at 241st Street

The exit is at the north end. Fare control is past the bumper blocks, from where there is one stair to the southwest corner of 241st Street and White Plains Road, and two stairs to the southeast corner.
