= Giorgini =

Giorgini is an Italian surname, derived from Giorgio (George). Notable people with the surname include:

- Aldo Giorgini (1934–1994), Italian artist
- Daniele Giorgini (born 1984), Italian tennis player
- Frank Giorgini, American ceramist
- Mass Giorgini (born 1968), American musician and record producer
- Saskia Giorgini, Italian-Dutch pianist

== See also ==
- 6775 Giorgini, a main-belt asteroid
