= Bowling Green station =

New York City Subway station in Manhattan

Bowling Green
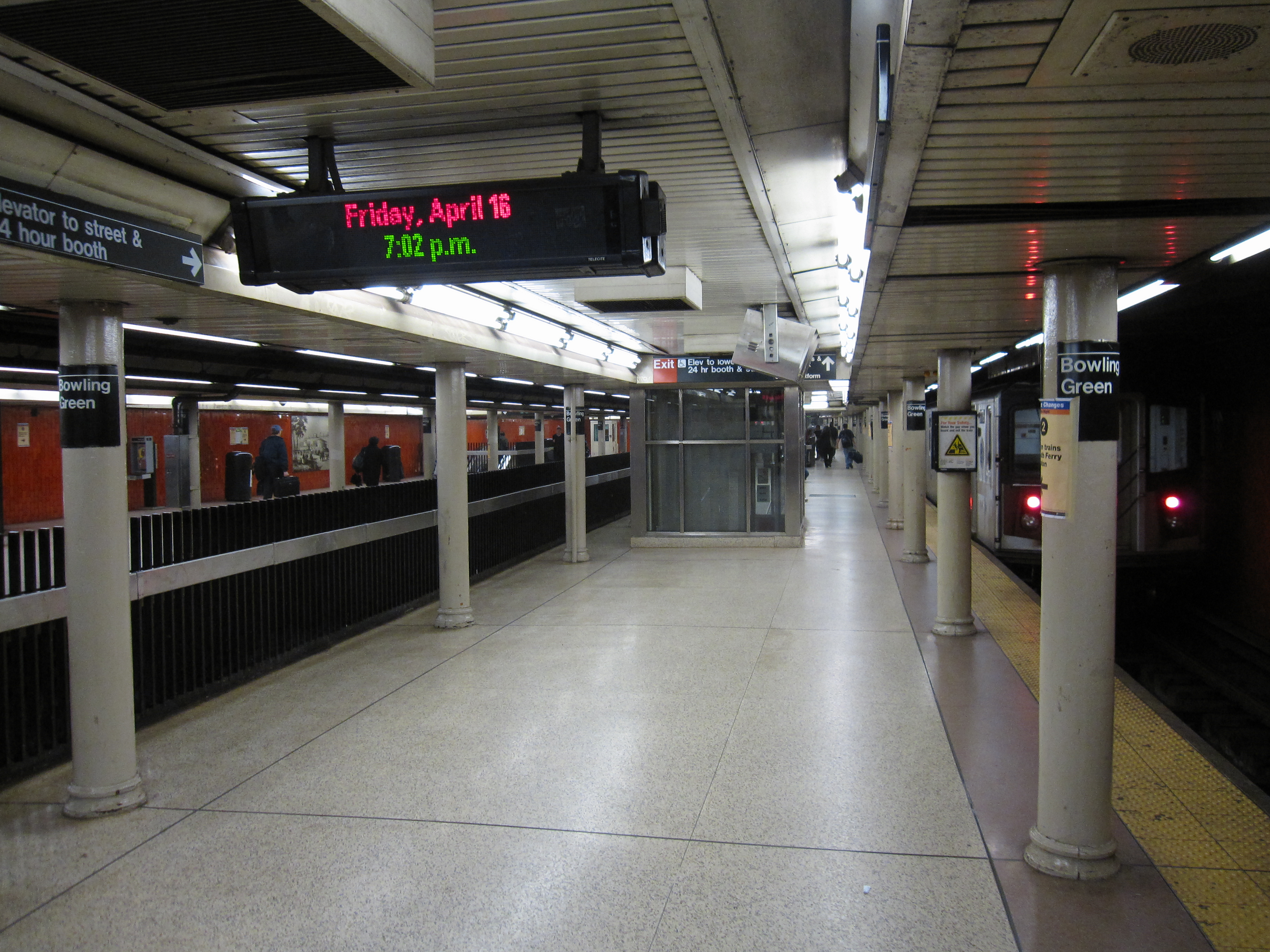
- View from the southbound platform, with a southbound R142A 4 train departing

Station statistics
- Address: Battery Place & Broadway; New York, New York
- Borough: Manhattan
- Locale: Financial District
- Coordinates: 40°42′15″N 74°00′52″W
- Division: A (IRT)
- Line: IRT Lexington Avenue Line
- Services: 4 (all times); 5 (all except late nights)
- Transit: NYCT Bus: M15, M15 SBS, M20, M55, SIM1, SIM2, SIM4, SIM5, SIM15, SIM32, SIM34, SIM35, X27, X28; MTA Bus: BxM18, BM1, BM2, BM3, BM4, QM7, QM8, QM11, QM25, QM65; Bee-Line Bus: BxM4C; NJT Bus: 120; Staten Island Ferry (at Whitehall Terminal)
- Structure: Underground
- Platforms: 1 side platform 2 island platforms (1 in use, 1 abandoned)
- Tracks: 2

Other information
- Opened: July 10, 1905; 121 years ago
- Accessible: Yes

Traffic
- 2025: 4,784,249 ▲2.4%
- Rank: 62 out of 423
Services
Preceding station	New York City Subway	Following station
Wall Street 4 5 via 138th Street–Grand Concourse	4 (New York City Subway service) 5 (New York City Subway service)	Borough Hall 4 5 via Franklin Avenue–Medgar Evers College
Non-revenue services and lines
Preceding station	New York City Subway	Following station
	no service	South Ferry shuttle; closed
Location
Location within New York City Subway
Location within New York City
Location within New York
Track layout
Street map
Station service legend
Symbol	Description
Stops all times except late nights	Stops all times except late nights
Stops all times	Stops all times
Stops weekdays during the day	Stops weekdays during the day
Stops weekday evenings only	Stops weekday evenings only
- Battery Park Control House
- U.S. National Register of Historic Places
- New York State Register of Historic Places
- New York City Landmark
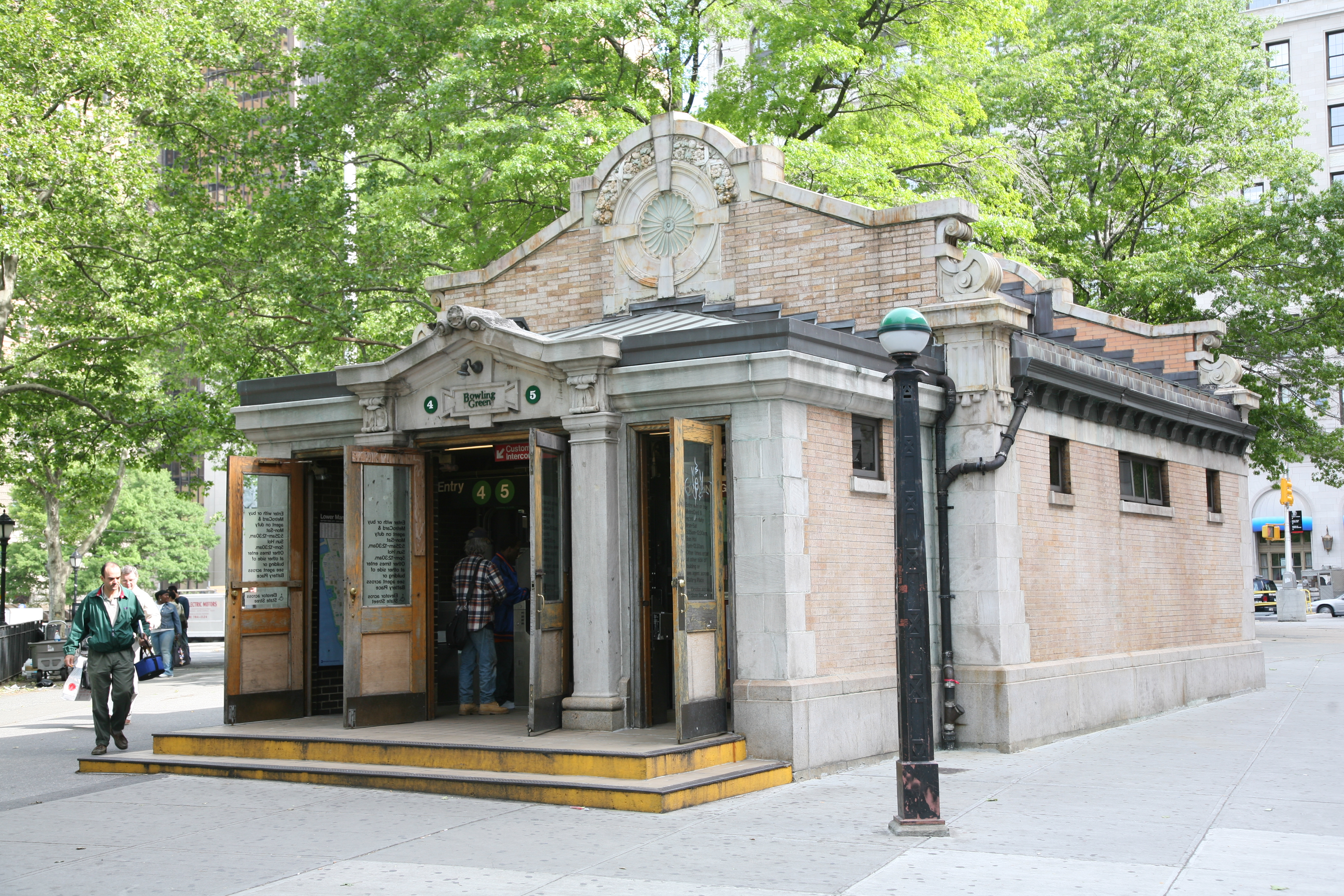
- Station headhouse on Battery Park dates to 1905
- Coordinates: 40.704106°N 74.014521°W
- Built: 1905
- Architect: Heins & LaFarge
- MPS: Interborough Rapid Transit Subway Control Houses TR
- NRHP reference No.: 80002669
- NYSRHP No.: 06101.001792
- NYCL No.: 0829

Significant dates
- Added to NRHP: May 6, 1980
- Designated NYSRHP: June 23, 1980
- Designated NYCL: November 20, 1973

The Bowling Green station is a station on the IRT Lexington Avenue Line of the New York City Subway, located at Broadway and Battery Place (at Bowling Green), in the Financial District of Manhattan. It is served by the 4 train at all times and the 5 train at all times except late nights. It is the southern terminal for the 5 train on weekends.

The station opened in 1905 as an extension of the Interborough Rapid Transit (IRT)'s original subway line to South Ferry. At the time, there was a single island platform with one exit at Battery Park and another in Bowling Green. When the Lexington Avenue Line was expanded to Brooklyn in 1908, some trains continued going to South Ferry, resulting in the creation of a short island platform at the Bowling Green station for the Bowling Green–South Ferry shuttle. The shuttle operated until 1977. During the 1970s, the station was completely renovated, a new exit was built, and a third, side platform was created for northbound trains.

The Bowling Green station contains two island platforms and one side platform. The westernmost island platform, formerly used by the shuttle, has been closed since 1977. The station retains its original head house in Battery Park, which is listed on the National Register of Historic Places and a New York City designated landmark. There are two other exits to Bowling Green, one of which contains an elevator that makes the station compliant with the Americans with Disabilities Act of 1990.

== History ==
=== Construction and opening ===
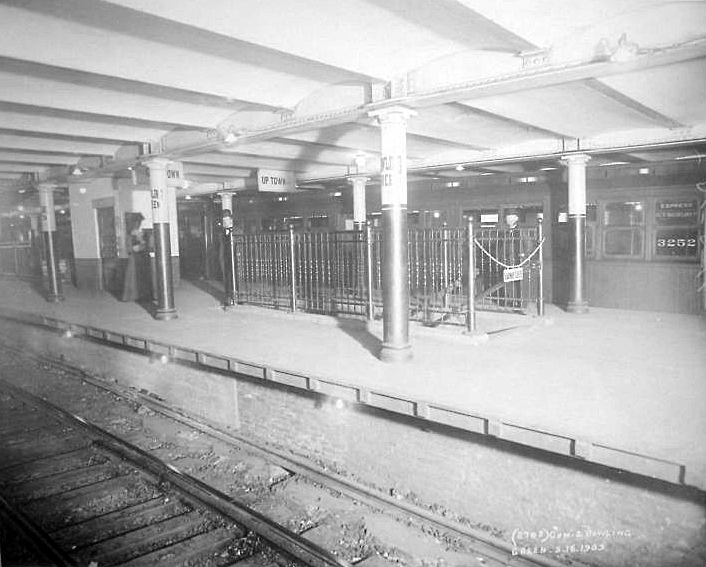
A view of the station in 1905

Planning for a subway line in New York City dates to 1864. However, development of what would become the city's first subway line did not start until 1894, when the New York State Legislature passed the Rapid Transit Act. The subway plans were drawn up by a team of engineers led by William Barclay Parsons, the Rapid Transit Commission's chief engineer. The Rapid Transit Construction Company, organized by John B. McDonald and funded by August Belmont Jr., signed the initial Contract 1 with the Rapid Transit Commission in February 1900, in which it would construct the subway and maintain a 50-year operating lease from the opening of the line. In 1901, the firm of Heins & LaFarge was hired to design the underground stations. Belmont incorporated the Interborough Rapid Transit Company (IRT) in April 1902 to operate the subway.

Several days after Contract 1 was signed, the Board of Rapid Transit Railroad Commissioners instructed Parsons to evaluate the feasibility of extending the subway south to South Ferry, and then to Brooklyn. On January 24, 1901, the Board adopted a route that would extend the subway from City Hall to the Long Island Rail Road (LIRR)'s Flatbush Avenue terminal station (now known as Atlantic Terminal) in Brooklyn, via the Joralemon Street Tunnel under the East River. Contract 2, which gave the IRT a 35-year lease, was executed between the commission and the Rapid Transit Construction Company on September 11, 1902. Construction of the Joralemon Street Tunnel began at State Street in Manhattan on November 8, 1902. There was to be a station at Bowling Green. South of the station, the main line would slope down to the Joralemon Street Tunnel, while a loop underneath Battery Park would allow southbound trains to serve the South Ferry station and rejoin the northbound track. The New York Times wrote that the installation of the switches between the loop and the main line presented "an engineering problem of great difficulty".

Work on the section of line from Ann Street (just south of City Hall) to Bowling Green had not started by September 1903, and McDonald blamed Parsons for the delays. The dispute was quickly resolved, as neither man had realized that the other did not want the project to disturb daytime traffic along Broadway; work started shortly thereafter. During the Bowling Green station's construction, workers uncovered and removed some of the original lampposts that had illuminated Bowling Green Park. The tunnel between Ann Street and Bowling Green was nearly complete by July 1904. The Bowling Green station opened on July 10, 1905. The station was originally built with a single island platform; a station head house at the south end, in Battery Park; and a secondary entrance at the northern end of the platform, adjacent to Bowling Green Park. There was as yet no IRT service to Brooklyn, and all Lexington Avenue trains terminated at South Ferry's outer-loop platform.

=== Early modifications ===
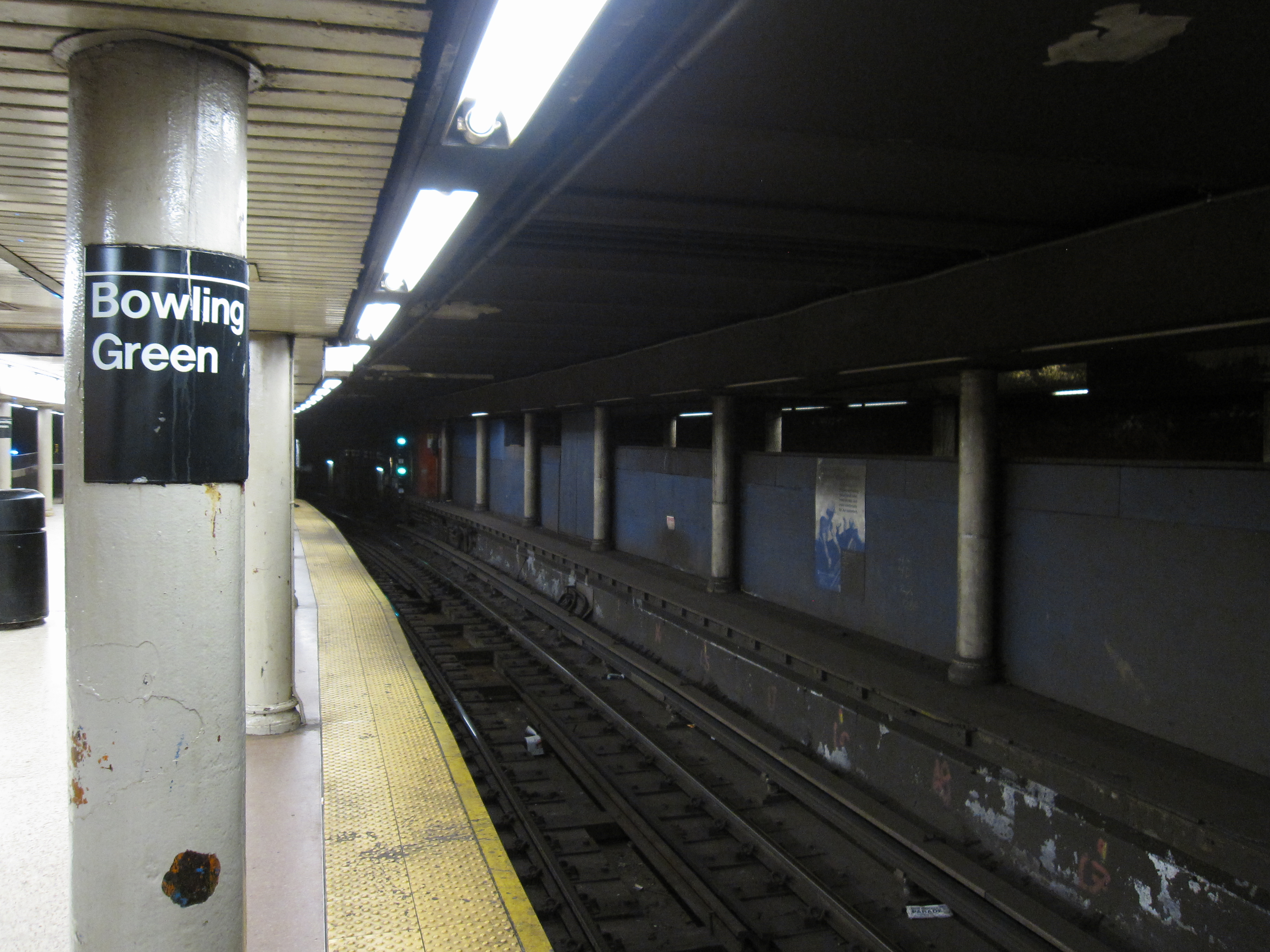
Former shuttle platform as seen from the southbound platform

After the Joralemon Street Tunnel opened in 1908, ticket sales increased at Bowling Green and the IRT's other subway stations in Lower Manhattan. Some trains continued to terminate at South Ferry, even during rush hours, while others went to Brooklyn. This service pattern was soon found to be inadequate for the high volume of Brooklyn riders. As a result, in 1908, the New York State Public Service Commission applied for authority to build a second, shorter platform and a third track to the west of the existing island platform. Three months after the Joralemon Street Tunnel opened, construction began on the third track and the western island platform at Bowling Green. Once they were completed in 1909, all rush-hour trains were sent to Brooklyn, with a two-car Bowling Green–South Ferry shuttle train providing service to South Ferry during those times. Even after the IRT Broadway–Seventh Avenue Line local service (1 train) began to South Ferry in 1918, the shuttle remained in operation until it was discontinued in 1977 due to budget cuts.

To address overcrowding, in 1909, the New York Public Service Commission proposed lengthening the platforms at stations along the original IRT subway. As part of a modification to the IRT's construction contracts made on January 18, 1910, the company was to lengthen station platforms to accommodate ten-car express and six-car local trains. In addition to $1.5 million (equivalent to $51.8 million in 2025) spent on platform lengthening, $500,000 (equivalent to $17.3 million in 2025) was spent on building additional entrances and exits. It was anticipated that these improvements would increase capacity by 25 percent. The main island platform at the Bowling Green station was extended 110 feet (34 m) to the north. On January 23, 1911, ten-car express trains began running on the East Side Line, and the next day, ten-car express trains began running on the West Side Line. The Lexington Avenue Line north of Grand Central–42nd Street opened on August 1, 1918, and all Joralemon Street Tunnel services were sent via the Lexington Avenue Line.

In Fiscal Year 1937, the platform was extended 102 feet (31 m) to the north. This avoided the need to install gap fillers on the curve at the south end of the platform. The city government took over the IRT's operations on June 12, 1940. On September 8, 1952, the New York City Board of Transportation made the entrance kiosk at Battery Place and State Street entrance-only instead of exit-only in order to relieve congestion at the station during the evening rush hour. A fare box was installed at the top of the stairway to accommodate the change. The New York City Transit Authority (NYCTA) announced plans in 1956 to add fluorescent lights above the edges of the station's platforms. The lights were installed the next year.

NYCTA architect Harold Sandifer prepared plans in the late 1950s for a modern-style station house within Bowling Green Park, which would contain a brick-and-aluminum facade, along with planters containing dwarf Japanese yew trees. The NYCTA approved the project in February 1958, awarding the construction contract to the Lenmar Construction Company at a cost of $87,200. The next year, the new station house in Bowling Green Park was completed, with new stairways to the platform. Later in 1959, contracts were awarded to extend the platforms at Bowling Green, Wall Street, Fulton Street, Canal Street, Spring Street, Bleecker Street, Astor Place, Grand Central, 86th Street and 125th Street to 525 feet (160 m) to accommodate ten-car trains. The NYCTA approved a proposal in September 1960 to install an experimental token-vending machine, which would dispense advertisements along with tokens, at the Bowling Green station. Work on the platform extension was still underway in 1962, and the project was substantially completed by November 1965.

=== 1970s renovation ===
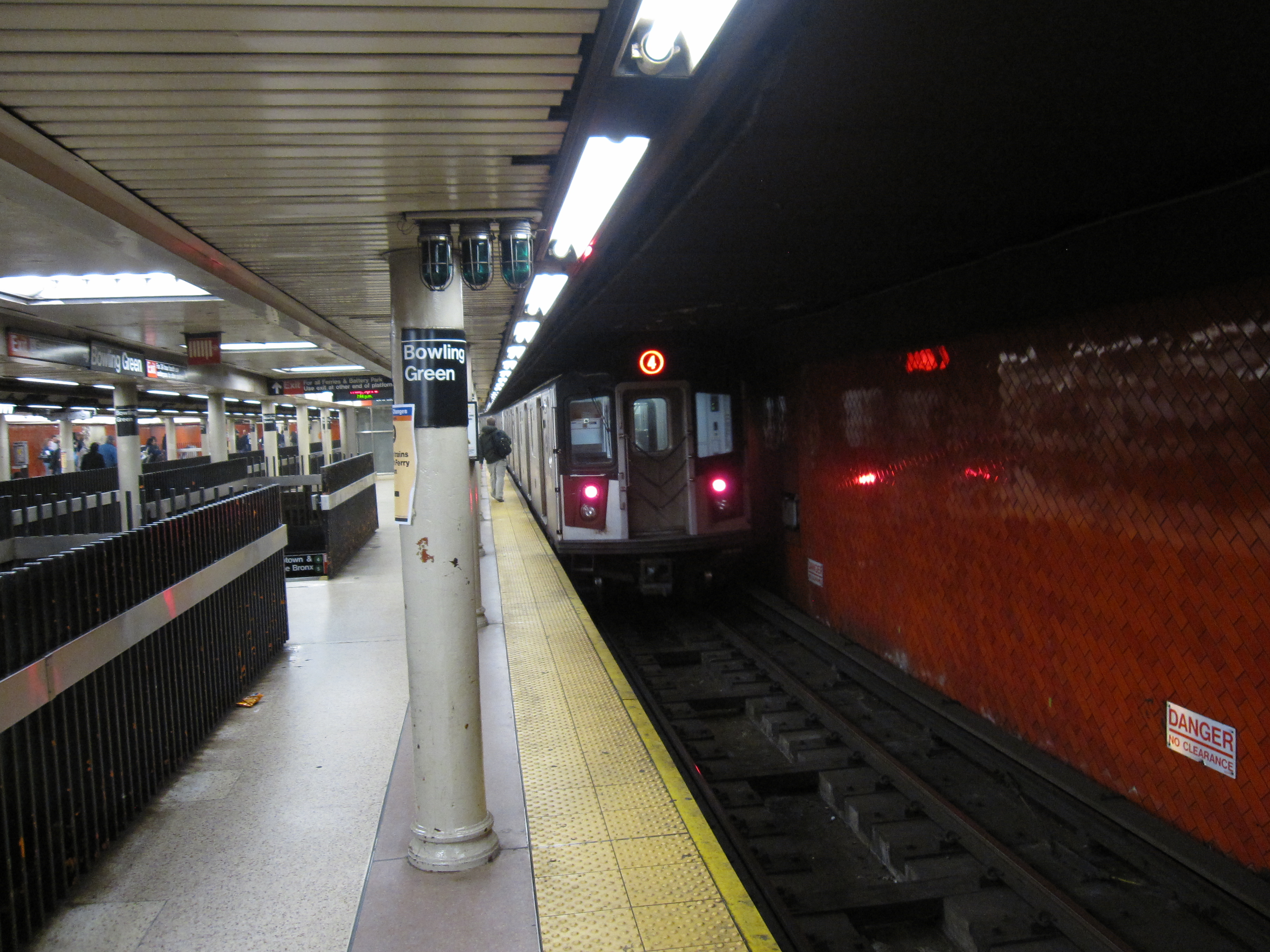
The orange tiles on the walls date to the 1970s renovation.

As early as the mid-1960s, local civic group Downtown-Local Manhattan Association had raised concerns that the Bowling Green station was severely overcrowded during rush hours. The association commissioned a study of the neighborhood, which recommended that the station's platform be extended and that its entrances be widened. In 1970, the New York City Planning Commission considered transferring the Custom House's unused air rights to 1 Broadway, where the Walter Kidde Company planned to build a 50-story skyscraper. In exchange, the Walter Kidde Company would have been required to pay for numerous improvements to the surrounding area. Local civic groups also proposed connecting the station to the basements of skyscrapers in the area, as well as to the then-separate South Ferry and Whitehall Street stations and a planned terminal for the Second Avenue Subway. By the early 1970s, the station had 14 million passengers per year.

On March 5, 1972, the Metropolitan Transportation Authority (MTA) announced that the station would be renovated and expanded, doubling the capacity of the station. The work was done in conjunction with the renovation of Bowling Green Park, which was rebuilt to conform with its appearance in the late 18th century. A new northbound side platform was built to alleviate congestion on the narrow island platform, which would then only be used by downtown trains. Stairs and a new mezzanine were built below track level, and a new exit with modern escalators was installed just south of Bowling Green. The street at the southern end of Bowling Green, in front of the Custom House, was converted into a pedestrian plaza. The new mezzanine, excavated under Bowling Green Park using a cut-and-cover method, was connected to the platform and street levels with ten new escalators. The existing subway entrance at the west gate of the park was removed, providing more open space in the park. These capacity improvements were made to accommodate increased ridership resulting from the construction of additional office buildings in Lower Manhattan, including the World Trade Center. The station lost its original mosaic tiles, which were replaced with bright red tiles, similar to those at 49th Street and the under-construction stations on the 63rd Street lines and Archer Avenue lines. In addition, the station's token booths were renovated.

Work was initially set to be finished in 1974. In July 1975, it was announced that the project's completion had been delayed to March 1976. In December 1976, a spokesperson for the New York City Transit Authority (NYCTA) said that work on the project would not be completed until early 1977. The southern headhouse entrance was closed for six months beginning in April 1978 as it was being rehabilitated. The renovation was completed in 1978 at a cost of $16.8 million. Funding for the project was provided from the NYCTA's capital budget. The Bowling Green station's renovation was supposed to be the first of numerous large-scale station reconstructions in the New York City Subway system.

At midnight on February 13, 1977, service on the Bowling Green–South Ferry shuttle was discontinued, and the platform and the track used by the shuttle were abandoned. The service was discontinued as part of a three-phase cut in service that the NYCTA had begun in 1975 to reduce its operating deficits. Despite the discontinuation of the service, the shuttle platform was renovated, receiving new tiling, signage, and refinished flooring. Some time after 1983, a fence was installed on the eastern edge of the island platform, which had been used to board trains prior to the opening of the side platform in 1978.

=== Subsequent changes ===
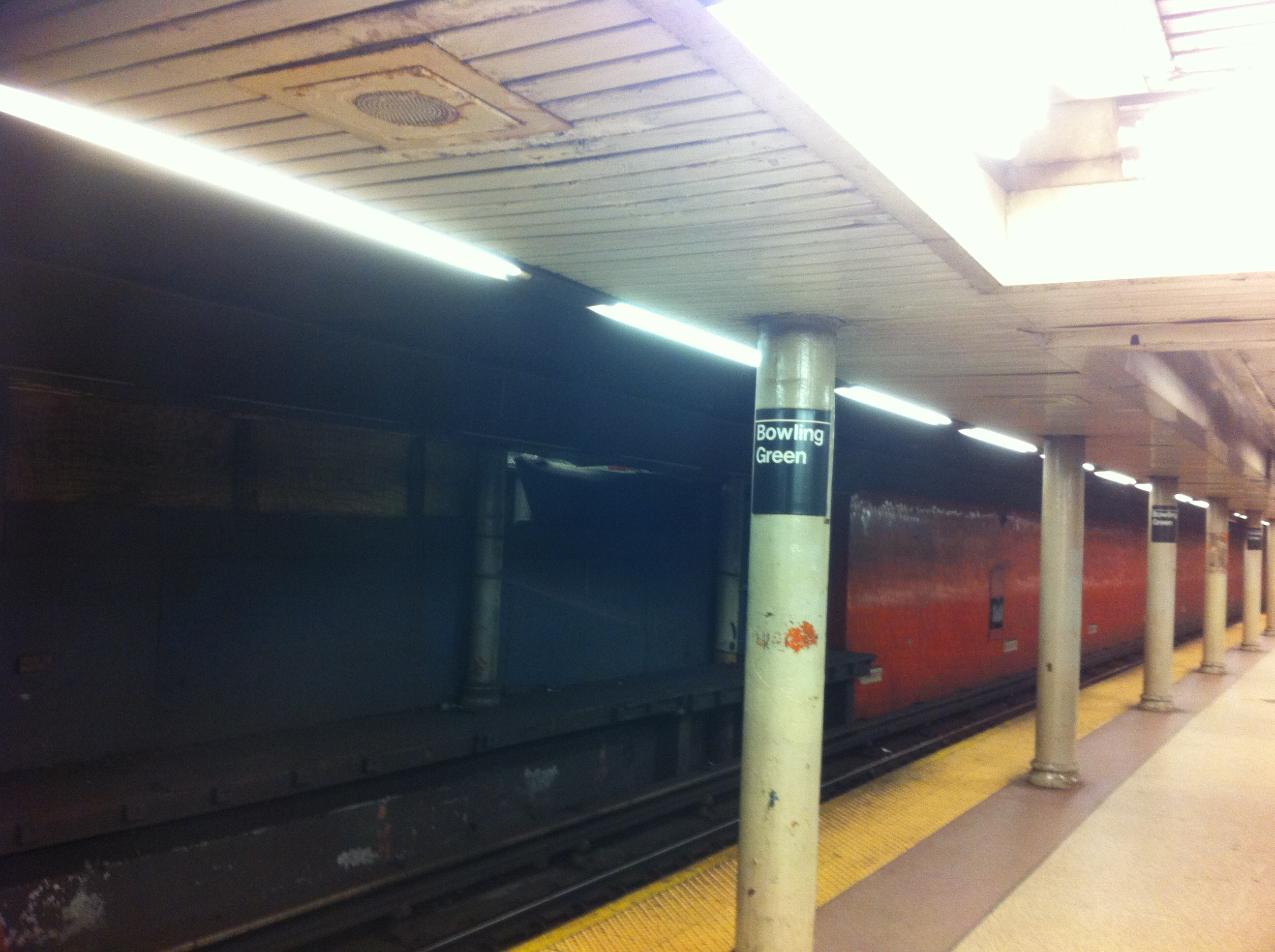
The Bowling Green station in February 2013.

In June 1999, MetroCard vending machines were installed in this station as part of the second batch of the fare-payment technology's installation. Following the September 11 attacks in 2001, members of the public expressed concerns that the station could be difficult to evacuate in emergencies due to its convoluted layout.

In early 2006, work began to make the station fully compliant with the Americans with Disabilities Act of 1990. The cobblestones around the station entrance near Bowling Green were replaced with granite pavers, an ADA-compliant path was constructed to Bowling Green Park, and a new glass canopy was installed over this entrance. The canopy, which was designed by Dattner Architects in 2003, consists of a curved steel and glass with stainless steel ribs, and is supported by a granite base. The unused shuttle platform was also walled off between 2001 and 2002. Work to install the canopy was scheduled to begin in late October 2006. In May 2007, the replacement of the cobblestones and installation of the glass canopy were completed. The elevators opened to the public on July 9, 2007, and a formal opening ceremony was hosted the following day.

The MTA added a hearing induction loop for passengers on the northbound platform, the first such installation in the subway system, during a pilot program in 2020. The MTA announced in December 2021 that it would install wide-aisle fare gates for disabled passengers at five subway stations, including Bowling Green, by mid-2022. The implementation of these fare gates was delayed; none of the wide-aisle fare gates had been installed by early 2023. The MTA announced in 2024 that it would replace the station's existing waist-high turnstiles with taller, wide-aisle turnstiles. According to a study conducted by New York University researchers and published in 2024, the Bowling Green station had some of the highest particulate matter pollution levels of any subway station in New York City.

== Station layout ==
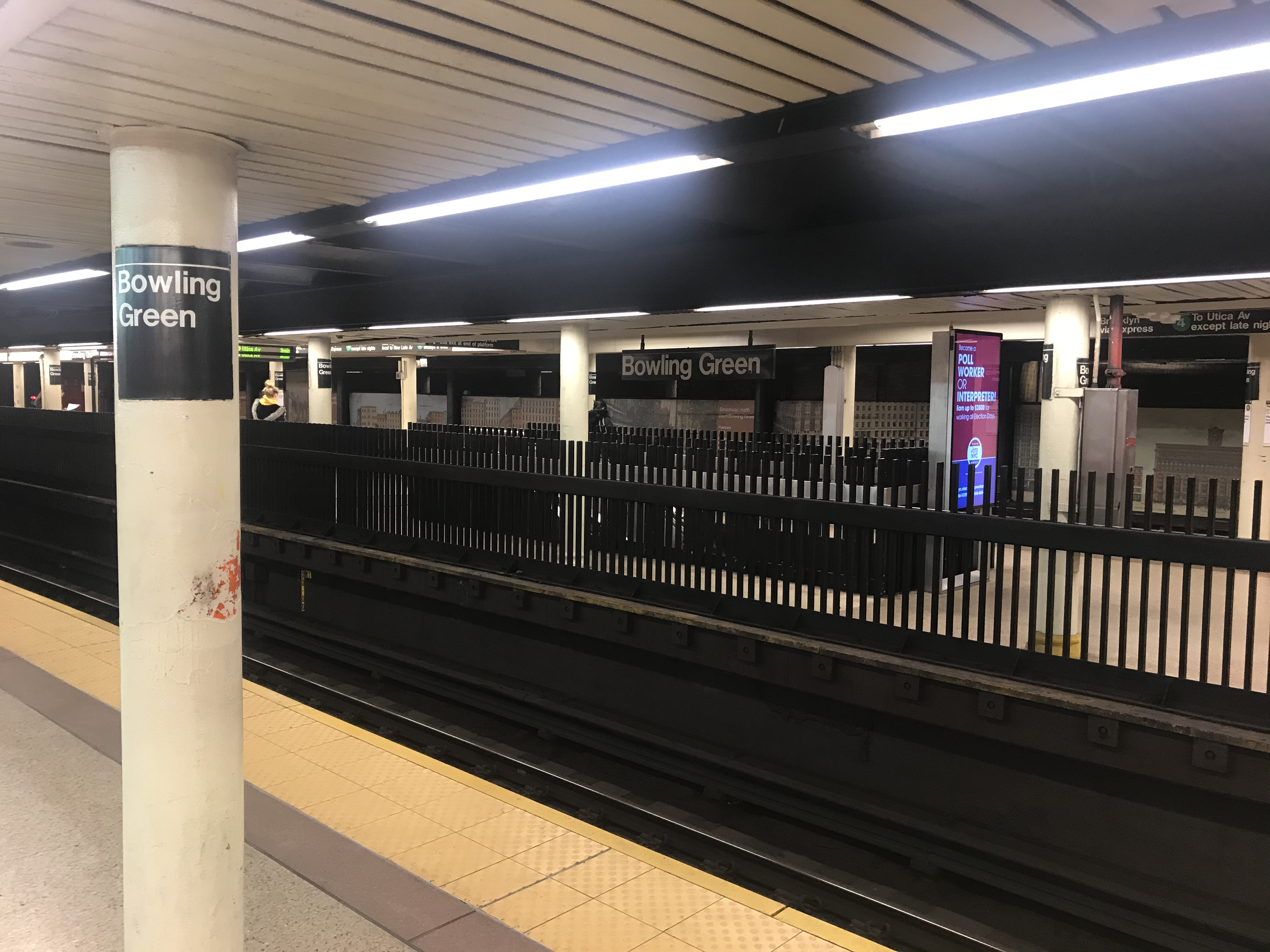
View of the southbound and abandoned shuttle platforms from the northbound platform

The station, located at Broadway and Battery Place, is served by the 4 train at all times and by the 5 train at all times except late nights. The station is between Wall Street to the north and Borough Hall in Brooklyn to the south; it is the southern terminus for the 5 train during weekends and mid-weekday evenings. The Bowling Green station has three tracks and three platforms, of which two tracks and two platforms are in service. The center island platform serves southbound and terminating trains, and a slightly offset side platform to the east serves northbound trains. A fence is located along the eastern edge of the island platform, preventing northbound trains from releasing passengers onto the island platform. The side platform and the wall facing the downtown track have orange brick tiles. Both platforms have circular platform columns painted in beige. The platforms also have cooling fans.

An abandoned and walled-off island platform and track on the west side of the station were formerly used by the Bowling Green–South Ferry shuttle, which traveled to the inner platform at South Ferry. This platform was connected to the island platform with an underpass at its northern end.

Escalators and stairs connect both platforms to the mezzanine below track level, where free transfers can be made between the two platforms. On the uptown platform, pairs of escalators and staircases lead to the mezzanine, while on the downtown platform, alternating staircases and escalators descend to the mezzanine. The Bowling Green station is fully wheelchair-accessible under the Americans with Disabilities Act of 1990 and contains two elevators. One connects street level, the main northbound fare control, and the southbound fare control area below the platforms and tracks. The other connects the Brooklyn-bound platform with the fare control area below the tracks.

There are two banks of turnstiles on the north and south sides of the mezzanine, which is outside fare control. A pair of escalators and a staircase leads from the eastern end of the mezzanine to an upper mezzanine, which contains the token booth, and a bank of turnstiles, which leads directly onto the uptown side platform.

=== Track layout ===
South of the station, the tracks diverge into two sets. One set (the inner tracks) enters the Joralemon Street Tunnel to travel to Brooklyn, sloping down at a gradient of just over three percent. This route is used by the 4 train at all times and the 5 train on weekdays until 8:45 pm. The outer tracks continue to the closed South Ferry inner loop station, which is used by the 5 train when it short turns at this station during weekends and mid-weekday evenings.

== Exits ==
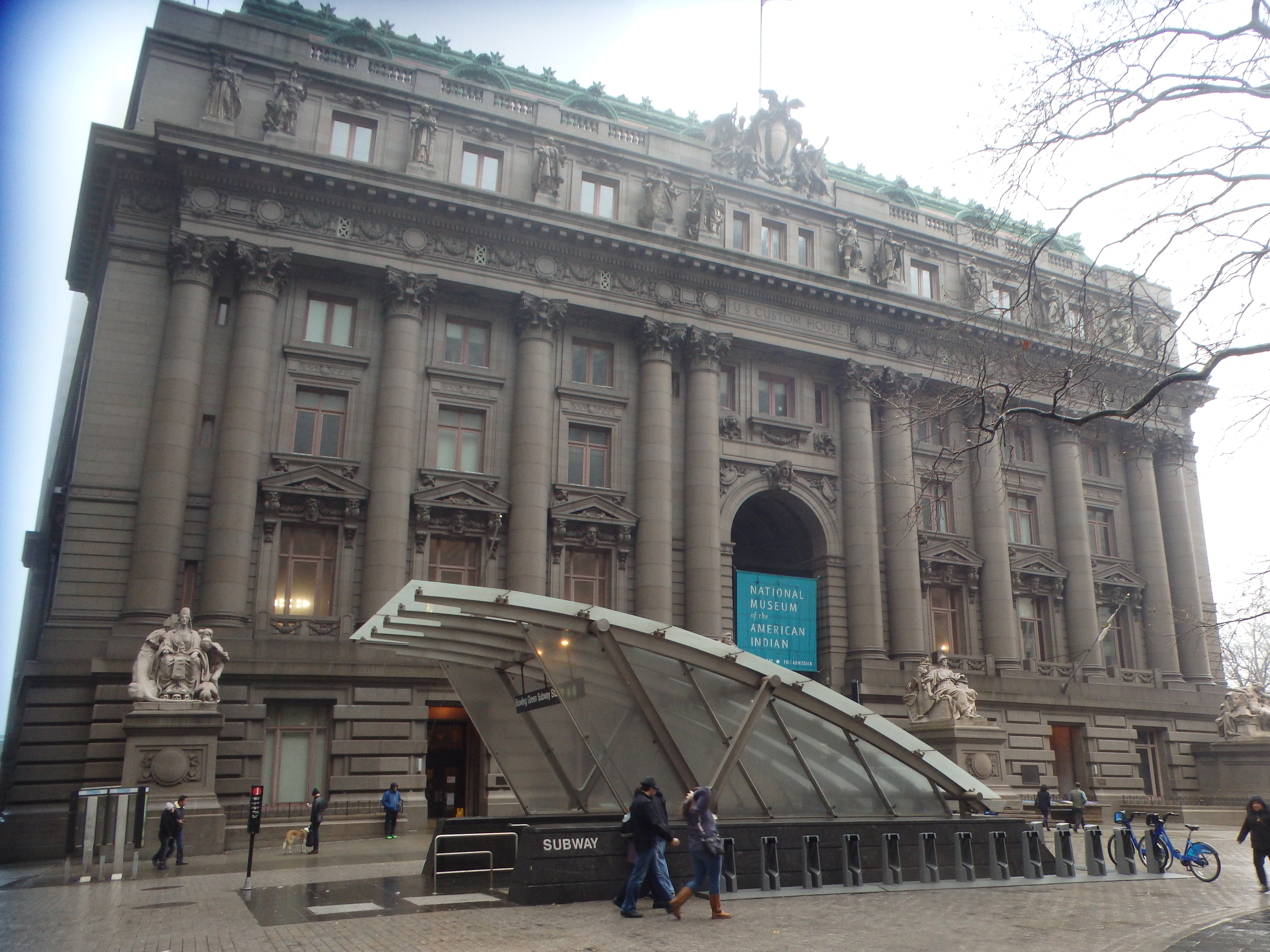
Station entrance in Bowling Green, in front of the Alexander Hamilton U.S. Custom House

The station has three street stairs, an elevator, a set of escalators, and an original control house (also known as the head house). These exits are clustered in three separate locations.

The eastern end of the upper mezzanine, toward the center of the station, leads to a pair of staircases and an up escalator that leads to Bowling Green plaza. There is a glass-canopied stairs-and-escalator entrance in front of the Alexander Hamilton U.S. Custom House, just around the corner from two entrances to the Whitehall Street–South Ferry station on the BMT Broadway Line (which are set into the building's eastern elevation).

At the eastern end of the lower mezzanine, a pair of escalators and a staircase lead to an intermediate level. This, in turn, leads to a pair of staircases on the north side of Battery Place between Greenwich Street and Broadway, outside 1 Broadway.

A staircase, at the southern end of the island platform, leads to a fare control area in the restored control house. which consists of a pair of low turnstiles at the south end, and two high entry/exit turnstiles flanking the staircase down to the platform.

=== Control house ===
At the south end of the station is the original head house, known as the Bowling Green IRT Control House or Battery Park Control House, on the west side of State Street south of Broadway. This subway entrance was designed by Heins & LaFarge and built in 1905 on the west side of State Street, across from the Alexander Hamilton U.S. Custom House. It was built as one of several station houses on the original IRT; similar station houses were built at 72nd, 96th, 103rd, and 116th Streets. The control house is listed on the National Register of Historic Places and is a New York City designated landmark. Although most of the original subway's entry points had steel and glass kiosks (such as at Astor Place), important stations like Bowling Green were marked with a brick and stone control house, so called because they helped control the passenger flow.

The facade is made of yellow brick, with limestone banding and triglyphs at its tops, a base of granite, and a gable roof. The doorways to the control house are located on the north and south of the structure; the northern doorway has an elaborate pediment above it, and the southern doorway has been extended with three exit doors. Inside, the control house has turnstiles at street level and a single stair down to the extreme southern end of the island platform.

== Artwork ==
The Bowling Green station has lightboxes with rotating content. Since 2018, the exhibition has been "Daily Voyage", featuring pictures taken by Glen DiCrocco of regular commuters on the Staten Island Ferry. Some of these photos can be seen on the MTA's Flickr account as well.

== Nearby points of interest ==
There are numerous skyscrapers and other structures immediately surrounding the Bowling Green station (listed clockwise):

- Alexander Hamilton U.S. Custom House to the south; a New York City designated landmark on the National Register of Historic Places
- 1 Broadway, the International Mercantile Marine Company Building; a New York City designated landmark on the National Register of Historic Places
- Bowling Green Offices Building, 11 Broadway; a New York City designated landmark
- Cunard Building, 25 Broadway; a New York City designated landmark
- 26 Broadway, the Standard Oil Company Building, on the east side of Broadway, facing the Cunard Building; a New York City designated landmark
- 2 Broadway, a Modernist glass structure that replaced the New York Produce Exchange Building

Another park, the Battery, is located right outside the southern entrance. Charging Bull, a 7,100-pound (3,200 kg) bronze sculpture, is at the north end of Bowling Green Park, immediately north of the station.

== See also ==
- List of New York City Designated Landmarks in Manhattan below 14th Street
- National Register of Historic Places listings in Manhattan below 14th Street
