= Doug and Mike Starn =

American artist duo

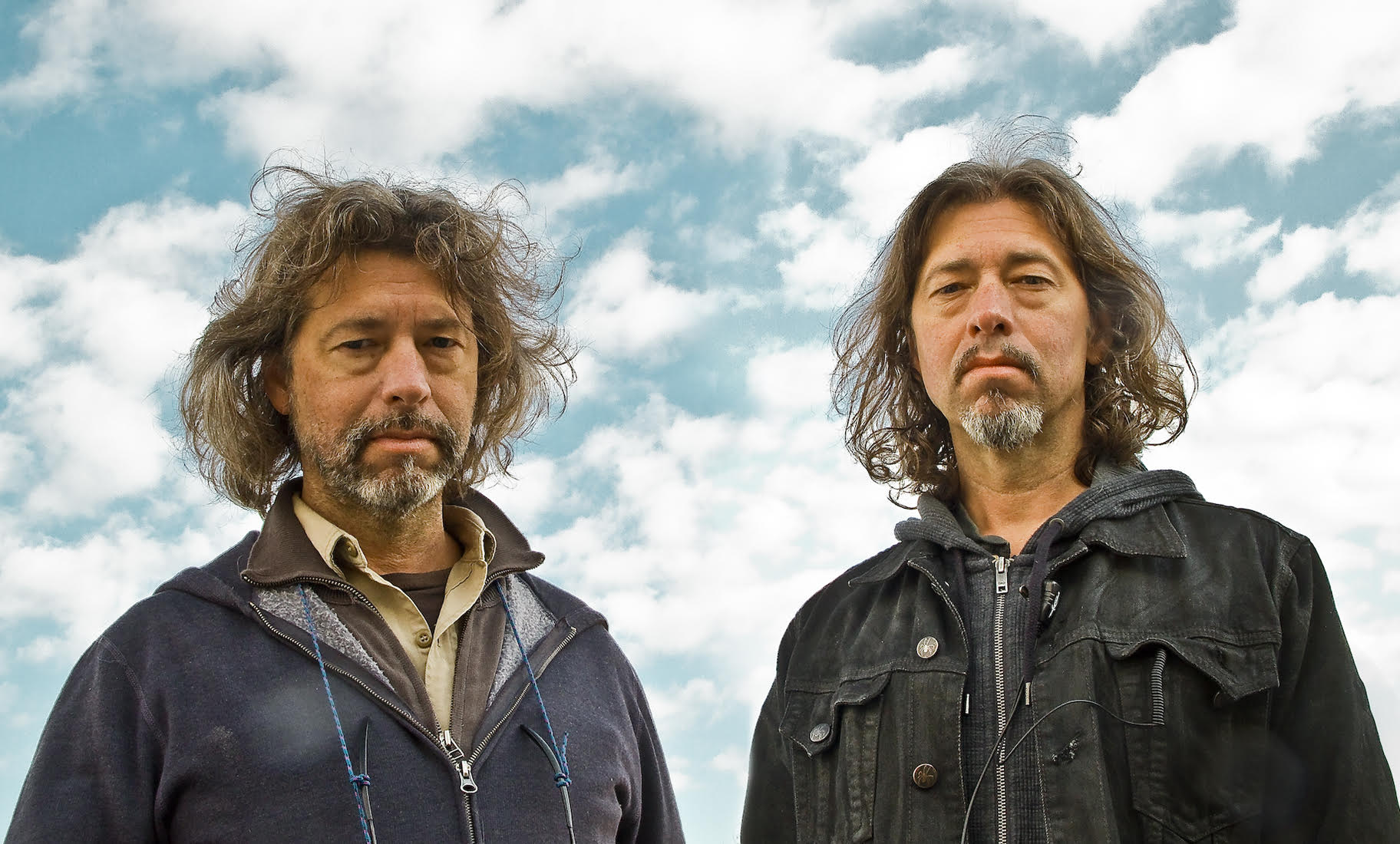
- Mike (left) and Doug Starn
- Born: 1961 (age 64–65); New Jersey, U.S.
- Education: School of the Museum of Fine Arts, Boston (SMFA at Tufts University)
- Awards: The Medal Award, School of the Museum of Fine Arts (2000)
- Website: http://www.dmstarn.com

Doug and Mike Starn (born 1961) are American artists, identical twins, and artist duo. Their work is known to transgress traditional categorisation, combining separate disciplines such as sculpture, photography, architecture, painting, video and installation. The Starn's work explores themes of interconnection and interdependence.

== Biography ==
The Starn brothers gained international attention at the 1987 Whitney Biennial. The Starns have been primarily working conceptually with photography for the past two and a half decades. They are recognized for their penetrating conceptualization of light. They employ this as a metaphor for the driving force of creativity and intelligence, and for how we live our lives. Concerned largely with interconnection and interdependence, chaos, time, organic systems and structures. They continue defying categorization, effectively combining traditionally separate disciplines such as photography, sculpture and architecture.

The Starns were represented by Leo Castelli from 1989 until his death in 1999. Their work has been the object of numerous museum and gallery exhibitions worldwide. Gravity of Light, a monographic publication (Skira/Rizzoli 2012) based on the eponymous exhibit, follows Attracted to Light (Blind Spot/powerHouse 2003) and Doug and Mike Starn (Abrams 1990). Their pieces are represented in important public and private collections internationally. They have received two National Endowment for the Arts Grant; The International Center for Photography's Infinity Award for Fine Art Photography in 1992; and, artists in residency at NASA in the mid-nineties. Their first permanent installation (glass, metal, and a stone mosaic) titled See it split, see it change, was inaugurated at the South Ferry subway terminal.

== Work ==
=== Big Bambú ===
Their 2010 installation Big Bambú :You Can't, You Don't and You Won't Stop, roof garden exhibition of The Metropolitan Museum of Art was the 9th most attended exhibition in the museum's history. Throughout the six-month exhibit, the Starns and their crew of 10-16 rock climbers continuously lashed and sculpted over 7,000 bamboo poles, a performative architecture of randomly interconnected vectors forming a section of a seascape with a 70’ cresting wave above Central Park. Big Bambú suggests the complexity and energy of an ever-growing and changing living organism. Other iterations of the series are in the permanent collection of the Macro Museum (Rome)--curated by Francesco Bonami--, the Israel Museum of Jerusalem, and were featured at the 54th Venice Biennale (Italy) and Setouchi Trienniale (Teshima, Japan). Since June 2014, a new permanent installation has been part of the Israel Museum Jerusalem sculpture garden, titled: Big Bambú: 5,000 Arms To Hold You.

=== See it Split, See it Change ===
In 2009, the Starns were commissioned by the Arts for Transit program of the Metropolitan Transportation Authority to design a permanent installation for the New York City Subway's South Ferry terminal. The artists produced a large-scale installation covering the wall of the South Ferry Terminal, featuring depictions of the tree limbs and maps of Manhattan on glass fused walls.

== Public collections ==
- Brooklyn Museum of Art, Brooklyn, New York.
- Art Institute of Chicago, Chicago, Illinois.
- Israel Museum, Jerusalem, Israel.
- Museum of Modern Art, New York, New York.
- Princeton University Art Museum, Princeton, New Jersey.
- Moderna Museet, Stockholm.
- Metropolitan Museum of Art, New York, New York.
- Museum of Contemporary Art, Los Angeles, California.
- Pérez Art Museum Miami, Florida.
