= South Ferry/Whitehall Street station =

New York City Subway station in Manhattan

South Ferry/Whitehall Street
- New York City Subway station complex
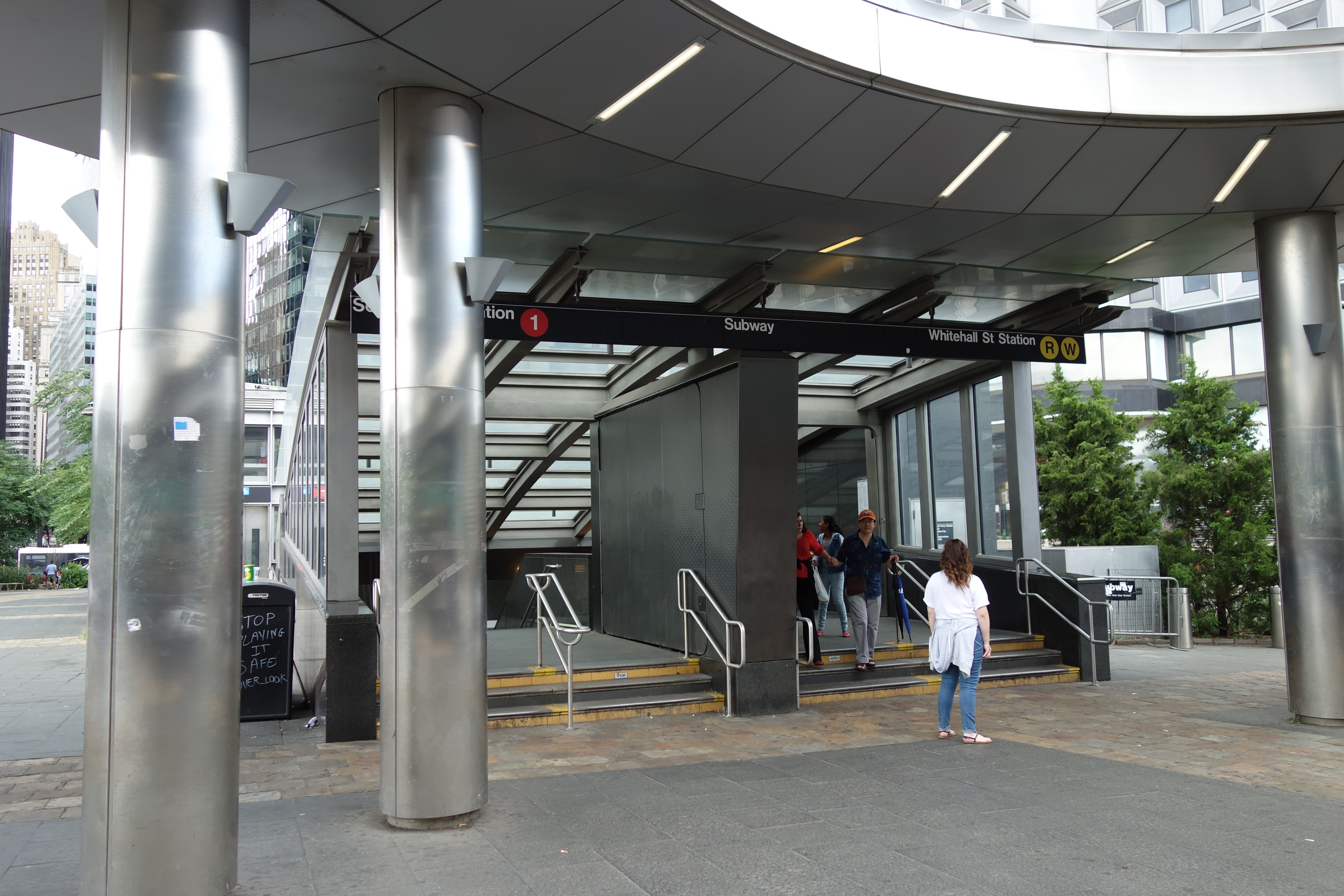
- The main entrance to the new South Ferry portion of the station on Peter Minuit Plaza in 2019

Station statistics
- Address: South Street & Whitehall Street; New York, New York
- Borough: Manhattan
- Locale: Battery Park and Financial District
- Coordinates: 40.7025°N 74.0128°W
- Division: A (IRT), B (BMT)
- Line: BMT Broadway Line; IRT Broadway–Seventh Avenue Line
- Services: 1 (all times); N (late nights); R (all times); W (weekdays only)
- Transit: NYCT Bus: M15, M15 SBS, M20, M55, SIM5, SIM35; MTA Bus: BM1, BM2, BM3, BM4, QM7, QM8, QM11, QM25, QM65; Staten Island Ferry at Whitehall Terminal

Other information
- Opened: March 16, 2009; 17 years ago
- Accessible: Partially (IRT Broadway–Seventh Avenue Line platform only)

Traffic
- 2025: 6,792,114 ▲4.5%
- Rank: 32 out of 423
Location
Location within New York City Subway
Location within New York City
Location within New York
Street map
Station service legend
Symbol	Description
Stops all times	Stops all times
Stops weekdays during the day	Stops weekdays during the day
Stops late nights only	Stops late nights only
Stops weekends during the day	Stops weekends during the day

The South Ferry/Whitehall Street station is a New York City Subway station complex in the Financial District neighborhood of Manhattan, under Battery Park. The complex is shared by the IRT Broadway–Seventh Avenue Line and the BMT Broadway Line. It is served by the 1 and R trains at all times, the W train on weekdays during the day, and the N train at night. The station is the southern terminal for all 1 and W trains and the northern terminal for late night R trains. This station replaced the Old South Ferry station loop that was originally supposed to close in 2009. However, due to the destruction of the new station by Hurricane Sandy, the old station reopened in 2013 and closed again in 2017 after the new station was repaired.

The complex originally consisted of three separate stations. In 1905, the Interborough Rapid Transit Company (IRT) opened a balloon loop at South Ferry, serving the IRT Broadway–Seventh Avenue and IRT Lexington Avenue Lines. The Brooklyn–Manhattan Transit Corporation (BMT) opened its station at Whitehall Street in 1918. The same year, the IRT opened a second loop for the IRT Lexington Avenue Line on the inside of the existing loop; the two loop stations were not connected to each other nor to the BMT station. Despite their proximity, the stations remained separate for 91 years.

In the early 2000s, as part of the recovery effort from the September 11, 2001, attacks, a new South Ferry terminal for the Broadway–Seventh Avenue Line was proposed. That station opened in 2009, replacing the loop station and providing a connection between the Broadway–Seventh Avenue Line's 1 train and the Broadway Line's N, R, and W trains. The new terminal for the Broadway–Seventh Avenue Line was severely damaged during Hurricane Sandy in 2012, and the MTA temporarily re-opened the loop station between 2013 and 2017, adding a temporary connection between the IRT Broadway–Seventh Avenue Line's loop and the BMT Broadway Line's platforms. The newer terminal reopened in June 2017 following extensive renovations and waterproofing work.

This station complex is the third on the site to bear the name South Ferry. The first was an elevated station located nearby, which was open from 1877 to 1950 and served the former IRT Ninth, Sixth, Third, and Second Avenue elevated lines. The second was the old South Ferry loop station, located above the existing station complex.

== History ==
=== Original IRT station ===
==== Construction and opening ====
Planning for a subway line in New York City dates to 1864. However, development of what would become the city's first subway line did not start until 1894, when the New York State Legislature authorized the Rapid Transit Act. The subway plans were drawn up by a team of engineers led by William Barclay Parsons, chief engineer of the Rapid Transit Commission. The Rapid Transit Construction Company, organized by John B. McDonald and funded by August Belmont Jr., signed the initial Contract 1 with the Rapid Transit Commission in February 1900, in which it would construct the subway and maintain a 50-year operating lease from the opening of the line. In 1901, the firm of Heins & LaFarge was hired to design the underground stations. Belmont incorporated the Interborough Rapid Transit Company (IRT) in April 1902 to operate the subway.

Several days after Contract 1 was signed, the Board of Rapid Transit Railroad Commissioners instructed Parsons to evaluate the feasibility of extending the subway south to South Ferry, and then to Brooklyn. On January 24, 1901, the Board adopted a route that would extend the subway from City Hall to the Long Island Rail Road (LIRR)'s Flatbush Avenue terminal station (now known as Atlantic Terminal) in Brooklyn, via the Joralemon Street Tunnel under the East River. Contract 2, giving a lease of 35 years, was executed between the commission and the Rapid Transit Construction Company on September 11, 1902. Construction began at State Street in Manhattan on November 8, 1902.

The South Ferry loop was built as part of subsection 2 of Contract 2 and was largely constructed as an open trench. Contractors installed a waterproof membrane and operated pumps continuously to prevent the loop from being inundated by water from New York Harbor. Battery Park was only 5 to 7 feet (1.5 to 2.1 m) above mean high water, while the South Ferry station, 23 feet (7.0 m) below, was as much as 17 feet (5.2 m) beneath mean high water. Because Battery Park had been created largely through land reclamation, workers found skulls, copper coins, logs, and remnants of brick piers when they were excavating the station's site. A temporary trestle was built to allow workers to remove dirt onto barges.

On July 10, 1905, the outer South Ferry platform opened; the inner track existed when the station was built, but only as a storage track. There was as yet no IRT service to Brooklyn, and all trains terminated at South Ferry's outer-loop platform. The Joralemon Street Tunnel opened in 1908, and all rush-hour trains started operating to Brooklyn the next year. To address overcrowding, in 1909, the New York Public Service Commission proposed lengthening platforms at stations along the original IRT subway. As part of a modification to the IRT's construction contracts, made on January 18, 1910, the company was to lengthen station platforms to accommodate ten-car express and six-car local trains. The South Ferry station was not lengthened, but the platforms at other stations were extended, and six-car local trains began operating in October 1910. On January 23, 1911, ten-car express trains began running on the Lenox Avenue Line, and the following day, ten-car express trains were inaugurated on the West Side Line.

==== Dual System ====
The Dual Contracts were formalized in March 1913, specifying new lines or expansions to be built by the IRT and the Brooklyn Rapid Transit Company (BRT). As part of the Dual Contracts, the New York City Public Service Commission planned to split the original IRT system into three segments: two north–south lines, carrying through trains over the Lexington Avenue and Broadway–Seventh Avenue Lines, and a west–east shuttle under 42nd Street. This would form a roughly H-shaped system. Construction started on a southward extension of the Broadway–Seventh Avenue Line in 1914. South of Chambers Street, there were to be two branches: one running south to the Battery and the other running east to Brooklyn via the Clark Street Tunnel. In order for the line to continue down Varick Street and West Broadway, these streets needed to be widened, and two new streets were built, the Seventh Avenue Extension and the Varick Street Extension. It was predicted that the subway extension would lead to the growth of the Lower West Side, and to neighborhoods such as Chelsea and Greenwich Village. The entire line, consisting of eight sections, was expected to cost $14,793,419.

Before the Dual Contracts were signed, the Public Service Commission had tentatively planned a subway line under Seventh Avenue. Because the route had not yet been assigned to the IRT, the plans for the Seventh Avenue subway had called for a second loop under Battery Park, stretching under Pier A and Castle Clinton, as well as a subway yard beneath Battery Park. When the Dual Contracts were finalized, the IRT revised the plans so the Seventh Avenue Line instead connected with the existing line's outer loop. The tunnel slightly underpinned a structure owned by the Chesebrough Manufacturing Company, which in July 1914 sued to prevent the tunnel from being built. During the line's construction, the contractor discovered an ancient cannon and two cannon balls under Battery Park. The Broadway–Seventh Avenue Line extension was nearly complete by late 1917, but the line did not have signals or electricity because of World War I-related delays.

The Broadway–Seventh Avenue Line was extended to South Ferry on July 1, 1918. The inner-loop platform opened the same year, serving trains on the Lexington Avenue Line. The IRT operated the South Ferry station until June 12, 1940, when the city government took over the IRT's operations.

Originally, only the end doors of each car of a five-car train could platform at the station, because of the large gap between the middle doors and the platform, owing to the severe curve of the station. This problem was remedied in January 1959 when gap fillers were installed. On February 10, 1959, the New York City Transit Authority approved a $185,000 project to renovate the station. The project would take a year to be completed. The project would remove change booths and turnstiles from platform level to provide more space on the platform and reduce congestion. They would be relocated to a new street-level station house that would be built out of terra cotta, aluminum, glass, and stainless steel. The doors of the new entrance would be connected with the ferry house ramp with a wide stairway. The structure would be designed to fit in with the Staten Island Ferry terminal. Work got underway on the project later in 1959.

=== BMT station ===
Also planned under the Dual Contracts was the Broadway Line of the BRT (which later became the Brooklyn–Manhattan Transit Corporation, or BMT). Contractors started constructing the tunnel under Whitehall Street in 1914. The first section of the Broadway Line, between 14th Street–Union Square and Canal Street, opened in 1917. Although the line was extended north to Times Square–42nd Street and south to Rector Street in January 1918, the short extension from Rector Street to Whitehall Street was delayed by several months. The BRT attributed the delays to "inadequate turnback facilities" at Whitehall Street and, in August 1918, announced that they would revise the track configuration of the station.

When the Whitehall Street station opened on September 20, 1918, it was the southern terminal of the Broadway Line. An additional entrance at the southern end of the station opened in November 1919, providing a direct connection to the Whitehall Terminal of the Staten Island Ferry. The line was extended south in 1920 when the Montague Street Tunnel opened. The station's platforms originally could only fit six 67-foot-long (20 m) cars. In 1926, the New York City Board of Transportation received bids for the lengthening of platforms at nine stations on the Broadway Line, including the Whitehall Street station, to accommodate eight-car trains. Edwards & Flood submitted a low bid of $101,775 for the project. The platform-lengthening project was completed in 1927, bringing the length of the platforms to 535 feet (163 m).

The city government took over the BMT's operations on June 1, 1940. On January 6, 1994, Automated Fare Collection turnstiles went into service at the Whitehall Street BMT and Wall Street stations.

=== Transfer and new IRT station ===
==== Planning ====
On September 11, 2001, a terrorist attack destroyed the World Trade Center, located slightly to the north of South Ferry and the Battery. The segment of the IRT Broadway–Seventh Avenue Line that ran through the WTC, including the Cortlandt Street station two stops north of South Ferry, was also destroyed; the line reopened in September 2002, bypassing Cortlandt Street. Concurrent with the rebuilding of that section of the line, MTA officials recognized the need to build a more efficient terminal for the 1 and 9 trains at South Ferry, since it was anticipated that the line would be heavily used in the long-term aftermath of the attacks. This also coincided with the renovation of Battery Park. The new station would also allow easier transfers for travelers to the Staten Island Ferry or the tour ferries to Liberty and Ellis islands. New York governor George Pataki presented plans in February 2003 for a $400 million South Ferry terminal with three tracks and two platforms.

Money was allocated for the new station's construction in 2003. The station was originally budgeted at $400 million, most of which came from a Federal Transit Administration grant that had been earmarked for the World Trade Center's reconstruction. Initially, neighborhood groups opposed the station's construction because of the high cost and low perceived time savings. The MTA contemplated extending the existing outer loop to fit 10-car trains. Community leaders acquiesced after being told that some of the money was going to be used to renovate Battery Park, and the South Ferry Terminal Project was allowed to proceed. New York State Assembly speaker Sheldon Silver expressed opposition to the new South Ferry station, prompting U.S. representative Vito Fossella to announce that he would block funding for the Second Avenue Subway (which Silver supported) unless Silver dropped his opposition to the new terminal. Silver eventually agreed to drop his opposition if funding was provided for Battery Park's renovation, and federal, state, and city officials reached an agreement in June 2004.

The FTA issued a Finding of No Significant Impact on August 30, 2004. During planning, the FTA evaluated several alternatives, including extending the existing loop platform northward; building the terminal with an extra track and platform; building a two-track terminal underneath the loop; building a two-track terminal directly under Water Street, to the east; building a two-track terminal along the waterfront under South Street, to the southeast; building a three-track terminal below the BMT Broadway Line's Whitehall Street station, under the namesake street; and building the terminal diagonally under Peter Minuit Plaza. Of these seven options, the last one was chosen because any other alternative would have been either too expensive or logistically infeasible.

==== Construction and opening ====
Construction of the station commenced in February 2005. The project was split up into three parts: construction of bellmouths, a fan plant, and track junctions from the existing line; approach tunnels to the station; and a new deep-level station. The bellmouths' construction would require that 270 feet (82 m) of the original tunnel would have to be rebuilt to accommodate the new junction. The fan plant, located to the east of the existing line, would facilitate ventilation from the new station, which would be located below three existing subway lines (the loop platform, the IRT Lexington Avenue Line's Joralemon Street Tunnel, and the BMT Broadway Line's Montague Street Tunnel). The two new approach tunnels would be single-track tunnels connecting to a cavern where a double crossover switch would be installed. The new 76,820-square-foot (7,137 m^{2}) station, located at a depth of 50 feet (15 m), would contain a 600-by-25-foot (182.9 by 7.6 m) platform, a new mezzanine level, escalators, and an elevator. The station would also contain three exits, as well as a modern air-conditioning system, which most existing stations lacked.

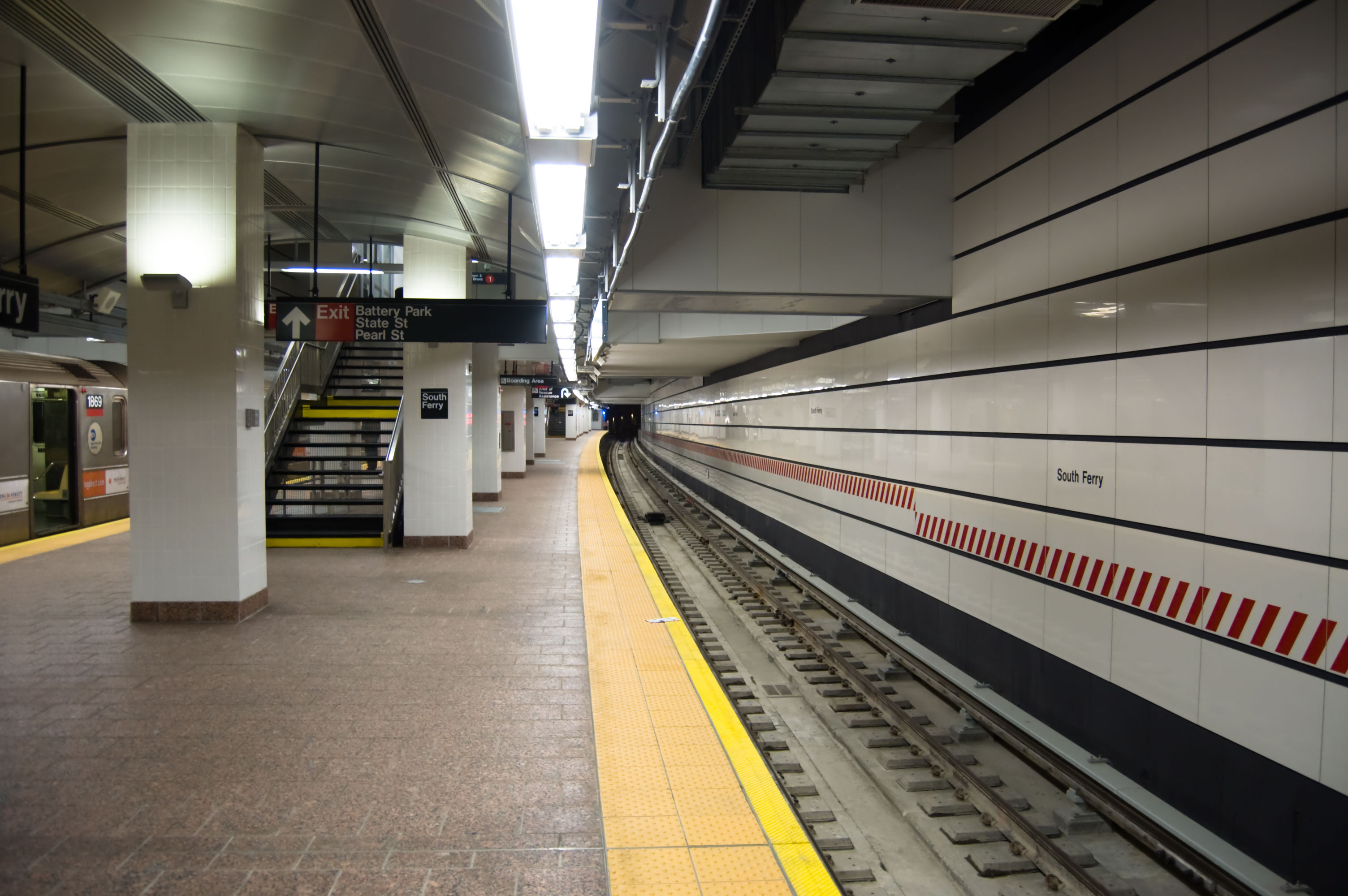
The platform view as seen shortly after opening in 2009

In late 2005, New York City authorities announced that builders working on the new station had found the remains of a stone wall from the British colonial era, during the late 17th or 18th century. After archaeological analysis, it was widely reported to be the oldest man-made structure still in place in Manhattan. Workers subsequently found another wall under the site. Four walls and over 250,000 individual artifacts were found in the excavation of the subway station. A portion of one wall was exhibited at the nearby Castle Clinton in 2006. The work involved excavating over 60,000 cubic yards (46,000 m^{3}) of rock, almost all of which was then recycled. By September 2007, MTA Capital Construction president Mysore Nagaraja predicted that the station would be completed by the following August.

In December 2008, news sources reported that the new station was essentially finished. The following month, MTA officials found that the tracks were too far from the edge of the platform to comply with the Americans with Disabilities Act of 1990. The error cost $200,000 to fix, forcing the opening to be postponed by several weeks. Other delays were attributed to leaks in the station, which were caused by the station's high water table. The station opened on March 16, 2009, a year after it was originally set to open. At $530 million, the new South Ferry station ended up being $130 million over budget. It was the first new subway station completed since 1989 when the IND 63rd Street Line stations opened. (Note: However, the South Ferry station did not qualify as a completely new subway station, as it was connected to a pre-existing station. On the other hand, the 34th Street–Hudson Yards station, which opened in 2015, is the first completely new subway station since 1989, since it is standalone and does not connect to any pre-existing stations.) In April 2009, MTA Capital Construction awarded a $19.2 million contract to Tully Construction Company to reconstruct Peter Minuit Plaza, which reopened in 2011.

==== Post–Hurricane Sandy ====
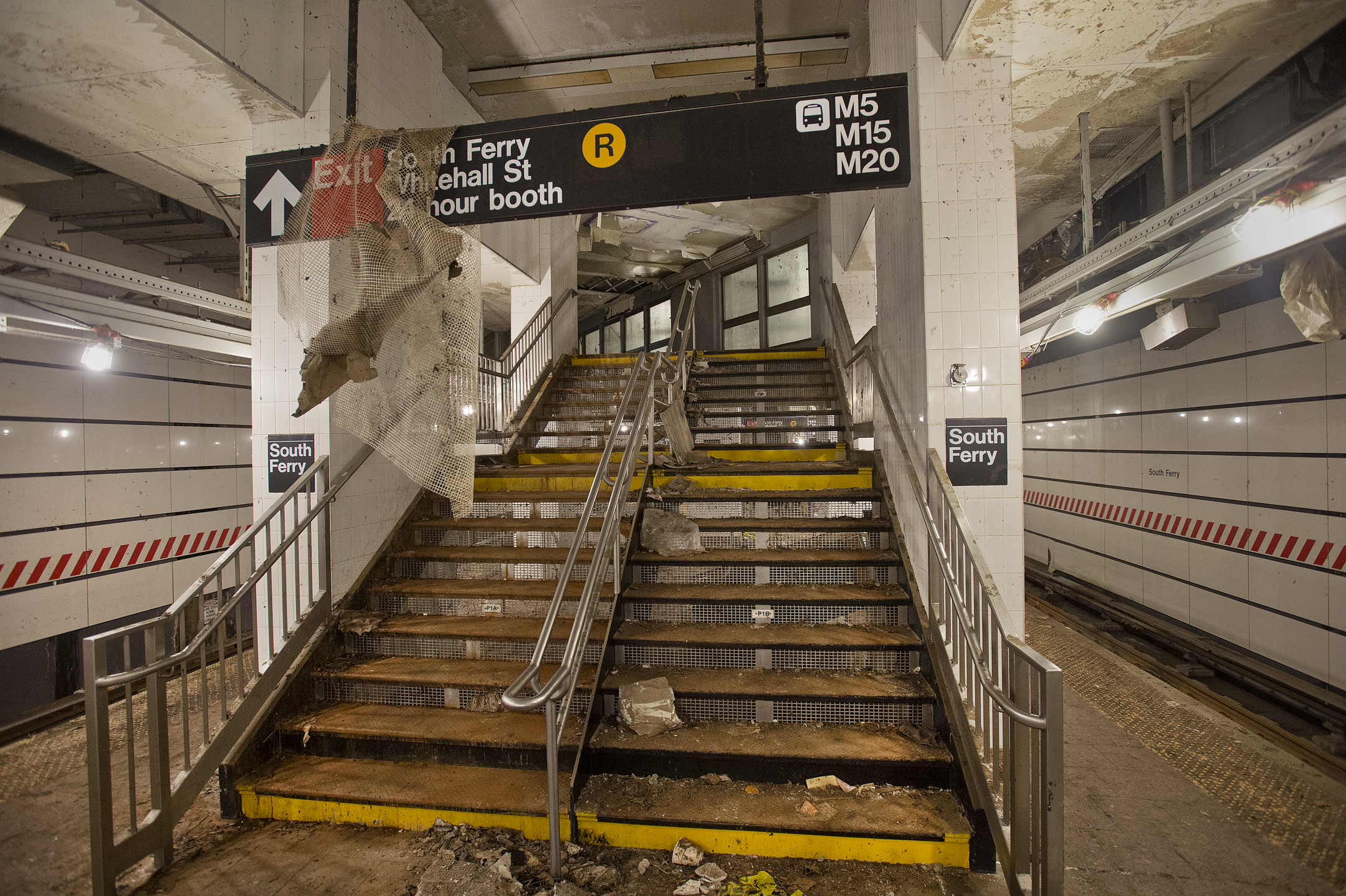
Station condition after Hurricane Sandy

On October 29, 2012, the new IRT station suffered extensive flood damage during Hurricane Sandy. The subway system had been flooded during the hurricane, and water ultimately collected in the lowest parts of the system, including the new South Ferry IRT station and many tunnels across the East River. The station was flooded in up to 80 feet (24 m) of salt water, submerging it from the track level to the mezzanine. As a result, the IRT section of the complex was closed until further notice, and riders had to either use the Whitehall Street station or walk several blocks north to catch a 1 train at Rector Street. The MTA estimated that repairs would cost $600 million and would continue until 2016. The Whitehall Street BMT station was less severely damaged, and full service to that station was restored by December 2012.

The MTA initially did not consider reopening the old IRT outer loop, saying that it no longer owned the station, that the platform was inaccessible, and that the only exits had been "halved to allow for an employee facility". After advocacy from Staten Island residents, the MTA indicated it would reopen the old outer loop. In March 2013, the MTA confirmed that the outer loop would be reopened. The 1 train's terminal was moved back to Rector Street until the old loop station could be put back into service. The outer loop reopened on April 4, 2013, and a new connection was built between the outer loop and the Broadway Line platforms. This connection necessitated the temporary removal of a 20-foot (6.1 m) section of the artwork See it split, see it change, which had been installed at the station in 2009. The outer loop was the first permanently-closed subway station in the MTA's history to have been reopened.

The new IRT station underwent renovations, signal room relocations, and extensive waterproofing work. The $194 million contract was awarded in November 2014 to Judlau Contracting, and the new IRT station underwent extensive reconstruction, including the sealing of vents, manholes, hatches, conduits, and ducts, and the cleaning up of the station. The project included the installation of retractable floodgates at the complex's exits and entrances. These improvements necessitated the closure of the station complex's main entrance for nine months starting in October 2015. The signage and lighting fixtures were also modified, and the "South Ferry" signs on the trackside walls were enlarged. The renovation cost $345 million. The station reopened on June 27, 2017, four years and eight months after Hurricane Sandy.

=== Service history ===
==== IRT stations ====
The South Ferry outer loop was the first to open. When it was completed in 1905, the outer loop was served by local and express trains along both the West Side (now the Broadway–Seventh Avenue Line to Van Cortlandt Park–242nd Street) and East Side (now the Lenox Avenue Line). West Side local trains had their southern terminus at City Hall during rush hours and South Ferry at other times, and had their northern terminus at 242nd Street. East Side local trains ran from City Hall to Lenox Avenue (145th Street). Express trains had their southern terminus at South Ferry or Atlantic Avenue and had their northern terminus at 242nd Street, Lenox Avenue (145th Street), or West Farms (180th Street). After the Joralemon Street Tunnel opened in 1908, some trains continued to terminate at South Ferry during rush hours, while others went to Brooklyn. This service pattern was soon found to be inadequate for the high volume of Brooklyn riders. As a result, a third track and second platform were added at the Bowling Green station, the next stop north. Once the new track and platform were completed in 1909, all rush-hour trains were sent to Brooklyn, with a two-car Bowling Green–South Ferry shuttle train providing service to South Ferry during those times.

The IRT's original line was divided into an H-shaped system in 1918. The first part of the "H" system to open was the Broadway–Seventh Avenue Line, which was extended down to South Ferry on July 1, 1918. Initially, a shuttle service ran along the Broadway–Seventh Avenue Line from Times Square to South Ferry. The Lexington Avenue Line opened north of Grand Central–42nd Street on August 1, 1918, thereby dividing the original line into an H-shaped system. Lexington Avenue express trains and Bowling Green shuttles typically used the inner loop, while Broadway–Seventh Avenue Line trains could only use the outer loop. The IRT routes at the station were given numbered designations in 1948 with the introduction of "R-type" rolling stock, which contained rollsigns with numbered designations for each service. The Broadway route to 242nd Street became known as the 1, the Broadway Avenue route to Lenox Avenue became the 3, and the Lexington Avenue express became the 5.

After 1959, all 1 trains became local, while 3 trains stopped serving the station, instead making express stops on the Broadway–Seventh Avenue Line and using the Clark Street Tunnel south of Chambers Street. Because of the sharp curve of the inner loop, only the center doors of a train opened there; however, the "R"-type cars could not open only their middle doors. As a result, Lexington Avenue trains were rerouted to the outer loop. The Bowling Green–South Ferry shuttle, which ran weekdays and at first also late nights, continued to use the inner loop, running to the west platform at Bowling Green. Specially modified R12 cars were used starting in the late 1960s until the service ended. These cars had two different door controls; the first opened the outer two sets of doors while the second opened the center set of doors only. The inner loop closed permanently on February 13, 1977, but the inner loop track is still used by 5 trains that terminate at Bowling Green during off-peak hours.

In April 1988, the NYCTA unveiled plans to speed up service on the Broadway–Seventh Avenue Line through the implementation of a skip-stop service: the 9 train. When skip-stop service started in 1989, it was only implemented north of 137th Street–City College on weekdays, and South Ferry was served by both the 1 and the 9. The station was closed from September 2001 and September 2002, as the section of the line south of Chambers Street was impassable after the September 11 attacks. Skip-stop service ended on May 27, 2005, as a result of a decrease in the number of riders who benefited. All 1 trains were shifted from the outer loop to the new island-platform station in April 2009, though that station was closed in 2012 after Hurricane Sandy. The outer loop was used as a temporary terminal for 1 trains from April 2013 to June 2017, when the island platform reopened. The island platform's reopening coincided with the start of a long-term weekend closure of the Clark Street Tunnel, which diverted weekend 2 trains to South Ferry for one year.

==== BMT station ====
The Whitehall Street station opened in 1918 as the southern terminal for Broadway Line local trains. The line was extended to Brooklyn when the Montague Street Tunnel opened on August 1, 1920. Broadway Line trains to Brooklyn could either use the tunnel, stopping at Whitehall Street and five other stations in Lower Manhattan and Downtown Brooklyn, or use the Manhattan Bridge, which skipped all of these stations. Initially, Whitehall Street was served by Fourth Avenue Line local trains (labeled as the BMT 2), Brighton Beach Line express trains (the BMT 1), and some rush-hour West End Line trains (the BMT 3). Brighton express trains were later rerouted to the Manhattan Bridge, while Brighton locals started using the tunnel. After the BMT Nassau Street Line was completed in 1931, West End trains via the Montague Street Tunnel started using the Nassau Street Line instead.

The opening of the Chrystie Street Connection in 1967 resulted in drastic changes to the services that stopped at the Whitehall Street station. The EE train (later the N) began running from Forest Hills–71st Avenue to Whitehall Street, while the RR (later the R) operated from Astoria–Ditmars Boulevard to Bay Ridge–95th Street, running via Whitehall Street. The EE route was absorbed into the N in 1976, and N trains alternately began running to Whitehall Street or to Brooklyn. (Note: In 1985, the RR became the R. The N and R routes' northern termini were swapped in 1987, so the N went to Ditmars Boulevard and the R went to 71st Avenue.) After the Manhattan Bridge was closed for repairs in 1986, all off-peak N trains began running through the Montague Street Tunnel, stopping at Whitehall Street. Starting in December 1988, N and R trains ran through the tunnel and the Whitehall Street station at all times.

When the Manhattan Bridge reopened in February 2004, the R train began serving the station at all times except late nights, while the N train only served the station at night. In addition, weekday W trains to Ditmars Boulevard used the Whitehall Street station as their southern terminus until that route was discontinued in June 2010. When the Montague Street Tunnel closed for repairs in August 2013, weekday R service was divided into two segments; the Whitehall Street station was the southern terminus of the Manhattan-Queens segment. The R train did not serve the station on weekends, and the N train did not stop there at all, until regular service resumed in September 2014. The W train was restored in 2016, and late-night R trains to Brooklyn began using the Whitehall Street station as their northern terminal.

== Station layout ==
The complex is composed of two formerly separate stations: South Ferry and Whitehall Street. The South Ferry station on the IRT Broadway–Seventh Avenue Line runs underneath Battery Park and State Street, between Pearl Street to the north and the Whitehall Terminal to the south. The Whitehall Street station on the BMT Broadway Line runs under Whitehall Street, between Stone Street to the north and a point just past Water Street to the south. The two sections are connected via a shared fare control area near the south end of the station, which is accessed via stairs in Peter Minuit Plaza and on the eastern side of Whitehall Street.

The Whitehall Street portion of the complex is underneath the original portion of Manhattan Island before Lower Manhattan was expanded. The South Ferry portion of the complex is under Battery Park, which is almost entirely built atop reclaimed land; this site historically contained the Kapsee rocks. The site of the South Ferry station is covered with 10 to 15 feet (3.0 to 4.6 m) of fill, below which is bedrock.

=== Exits ===
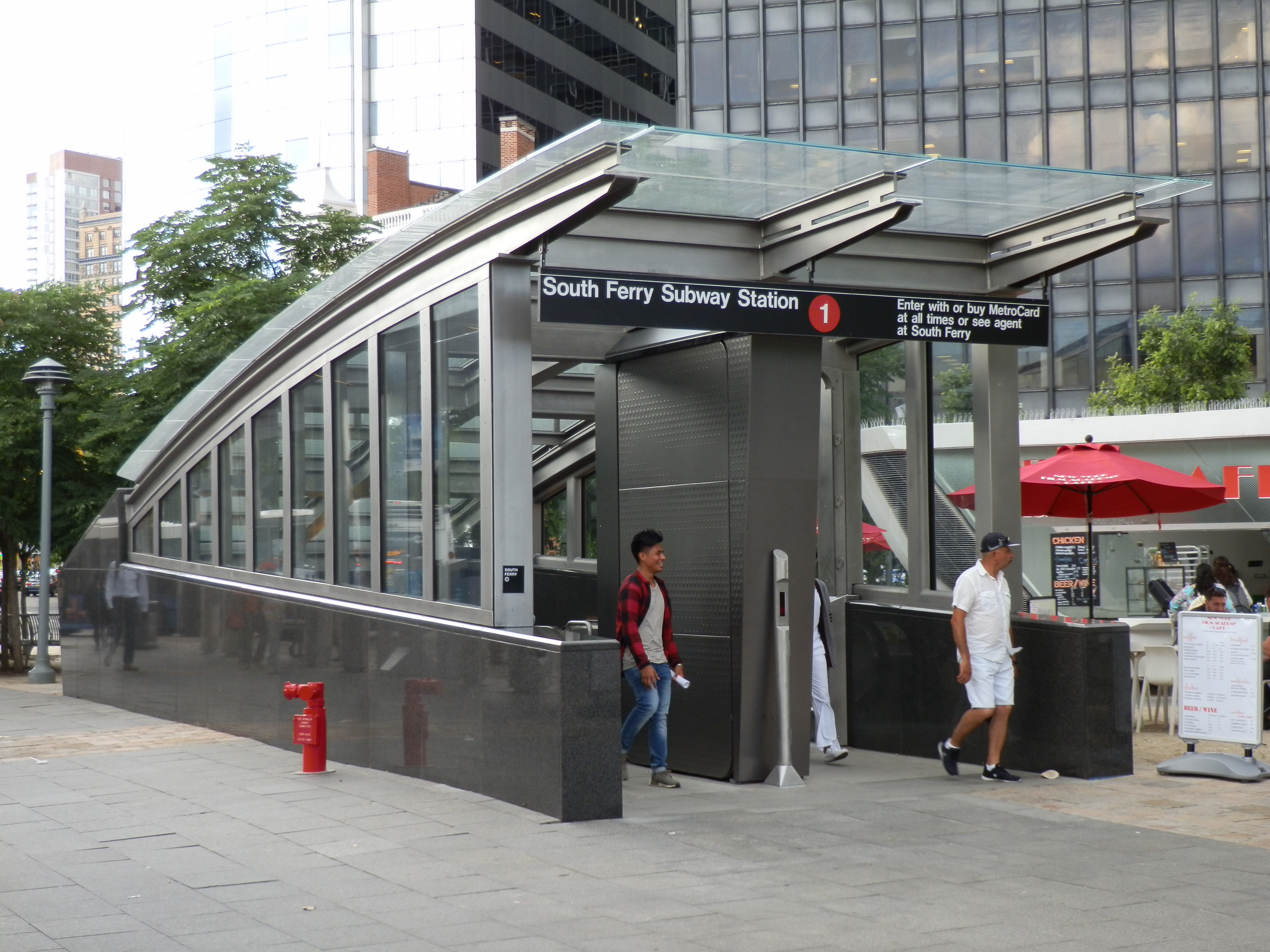
An entrance to South Ferry/Whitehall Street, seen in June 2017

Entrances and exits are located at the following places:

- Two staircases at the west side of Whitehall and Stone Streets, east of the Alexander Hamilton U.S. Custom House (National Museum of the American Indian)
- One staircase at the northeast corner of Whitehall and Stone Streets
- Two staircases at the southwest corner of Whitehall and Water Streets
- One set of staircase/escalators and one elevator northwest of the Whitehall Terminal
- One set of staircase/escalator outside of the bus stop at the southeast corner of Water and State Streets
- One staircase on the southwest side of State Street, south of the intersection with Pearl Street

== IRT Broadway–Seventh Avenue Line platforms ==
There are two separate stations on the IRT Broadway–Seventh Avenue Line, which are individually named the South Ferry station due to their connection to Manhattan's South Ferry. The name "South Ferry loops" is used for the old South Ferry platforms, while the newer platforms are called New South Ferry. The newer island platform station was first used by the Broadway–Seventh Avenue Line's 1 service from 2009 to 2012 until it was damaged by Hurricane Sandy, and was again placed into use in 2017. The outer loop platform was reopened on April 4, 2013, to provide temporary replacement service, and closed again in 2017 when the newer station reopened. It is occasionally used as the start point for the New York Transit Museum's special event trains.

=== Old South Ferry station (1905–2009, 2013–2017) ===
South Ferry
- Former New York City Subway station
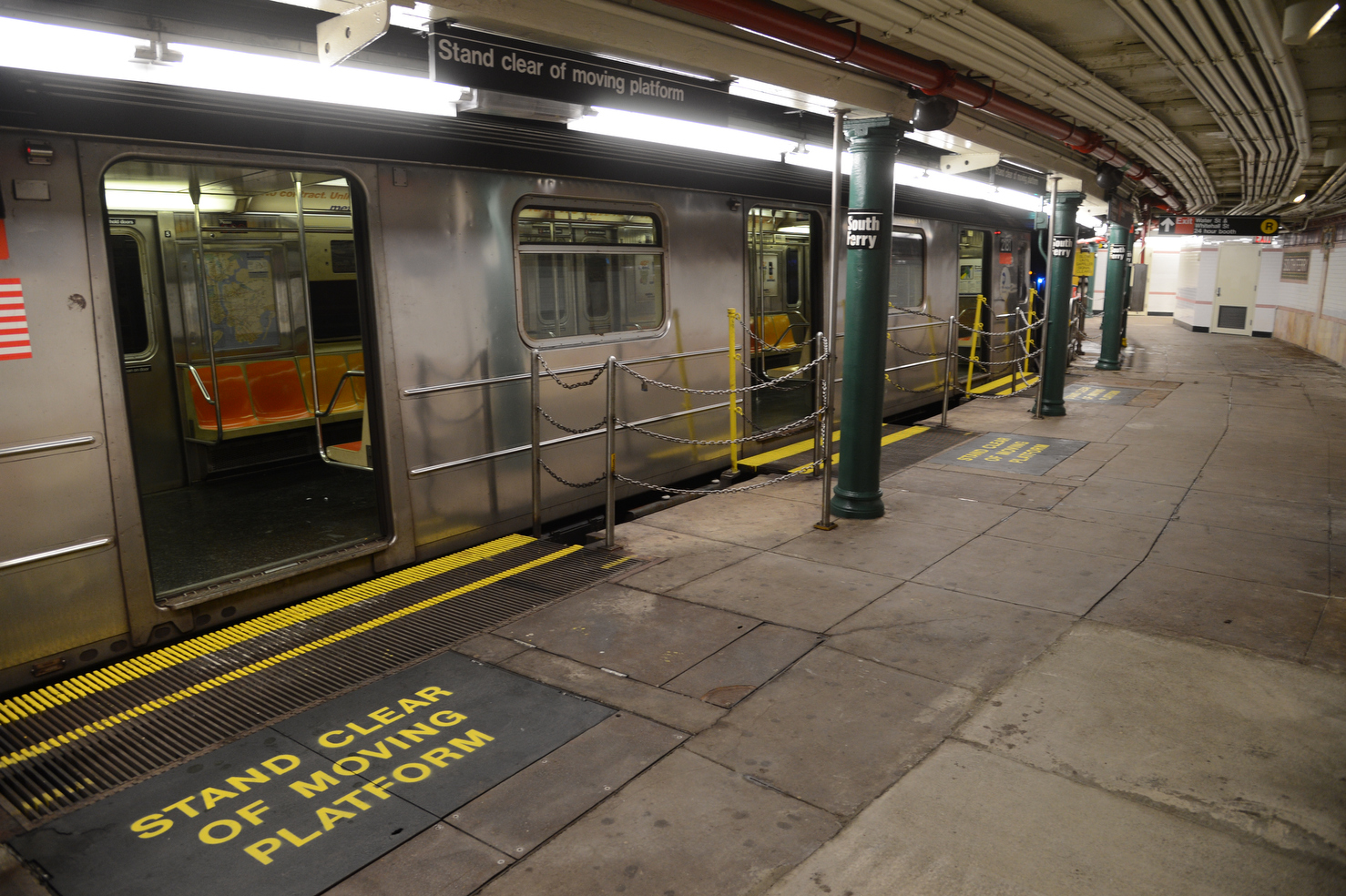
- Outer loop platform on reopening day (April 4, 2013)

Station statistics
- Division: A (IRT)
- Line: IRT Broadway–Seventh Avenue Line; IRT Lexington Avenue Line
- Services: None (abandoned)
- Structure: Underground
- Platforms: originally 2 side platforms, the inner platform is walled off
- Tracks: 2 balloon loops

Other information
- Opened: July 19, 1905; 121 years ago (outer loop); July 1, 1918; 108 years ago (inner loop); September 15, 2002; 24 years ago (outer loop, first reopening); April 4, 2013; 13 years ago (outer loop, second reopening)
- Closed: February 13, 1977; 49 years ago (inner loop); September 11, 2001; 25 years ago (outer loop, first closure); March 16, 2009; 17 years ago (outer loop, second closure); June 27, 2017; 9 years ago (outer loop, third closure)

Station succession
- Next north: Rector Street (Broadway–7th Ave); Bowling Green (Lexington Ave)
- Next south: (Terminal)
Track layout
Station service legend
Symbol	Description
Stops all times	Stops in station at all times
Stops all times except late nights	Stops all times except late nights
Stops late nights only	Stops late nights only
Stops late nights and weekends	Stops late nights and weekends only
Stops weekdays during the day	Stops weekdays during the day
Stops weekends during the day	Stops weekends during the day
Stops all times except rush hours in the peak direction	Stops all times except rush hours in the peak direction
Stops all times except weekdays in the peak direction	Stops all times except weekdays in the peak direction
Stops daily except rush hours in the peak direction	Stops all times except nights and rush hours in the peak direction
Stops rush hours only	Stops rush hours only
Stops rush hours in the peak direction only	Stops rush hours in the peak direction only
Station closed	Station is closed
(Details about time periods)

The Old South Ferry station loops consist of two side platforms on curved balloon loop tracks. Passengers had to leave the station to transfer between platforms. Generally, IRT Broadway–Seventh Avenue Line trains stopped on the outer loop platform, and IRT Lexington Avenue Line trains used the inner loop platform. The entire loop measures about 2,050 feet (620 m) long and originally included a storage track (the inner loop) measuring about 2,000 feet (610 m) long. The tunnel is constructed of concrete, with brick waterproofing on the walls and floors, as well as asphalt waterproofing on the roof. Within the station, columns were placed between the tracks at intervals of 5 feet (1.5 m); these columns supported 12.5-foot-wide (3.8 m) roof girders, which spanned either track.

==== Outer platform ====
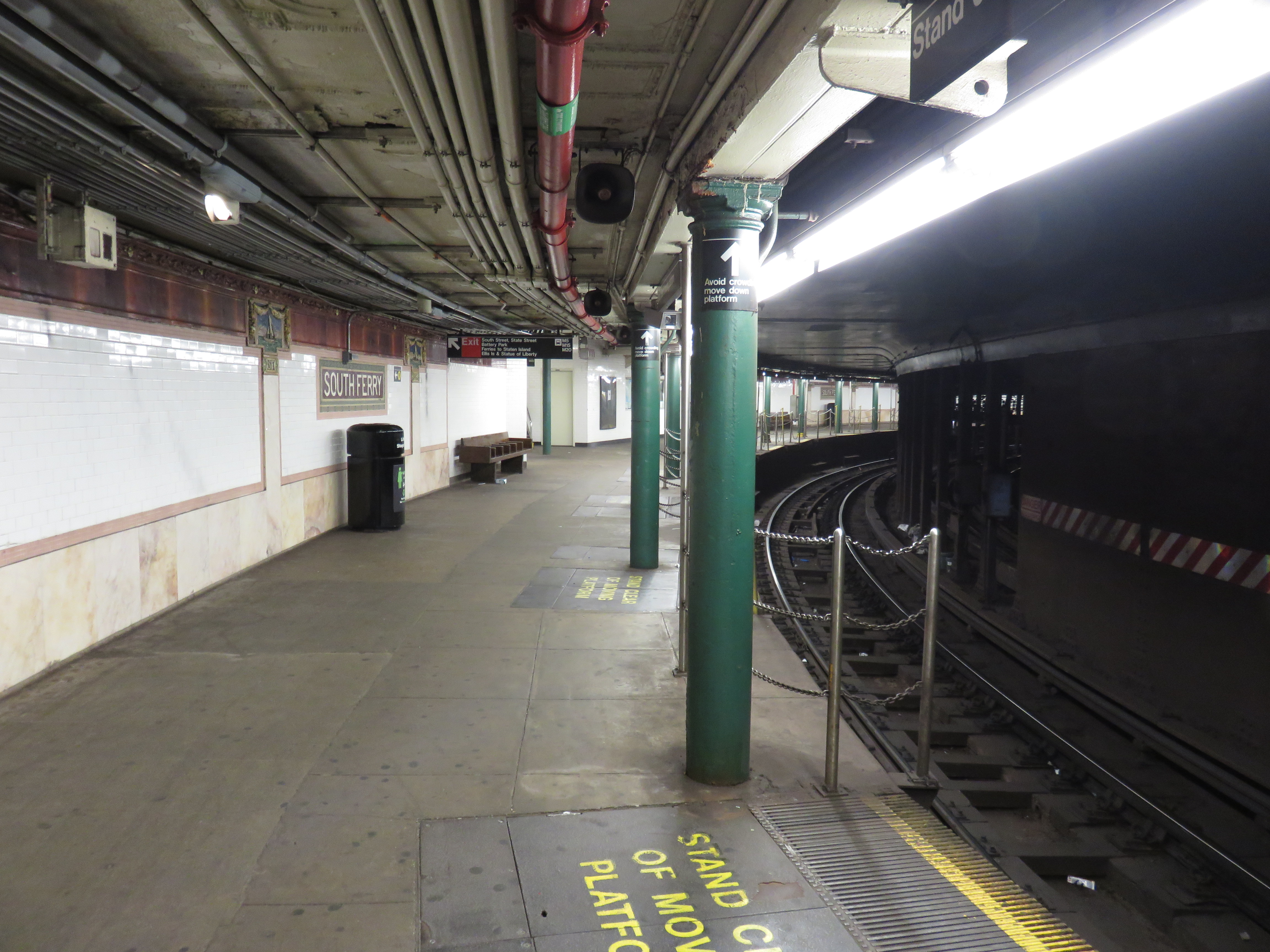
Looking down the platform

The outer platform was smaller than most others in the system, having only 16,800 square feet (1,560 m^{2}) of surface area, and it was originally served from two stairs leading from the Staten Island Ferry's Whitehall Terminal. The radius of the curve is only 190 feet (58 m), meaning that the platform curves approximately 77.5 degrees between its front and back ends. (Note: The 190-foot (58 m) radius indicates that a full circle of that radius would have a circumference of 1193.805 feet. A typical five-car IRT train is about 257 feet (78 m) long, as opposed to a ten-car train that is 514 feet (157 m) long. The proportion of the train's length to the full circle indicates that the arc is 77.5 degrees.) The platform accommodated the first five cars of a 10-car train, but the rear five cars could not load or unload. In addition, spray nozzles were required to lubricate the track to reduce the friction caused by the tight curve, which slowed train operation and generates a loud metallic scraping noise.

Because of the curve, gap fillers were required to bridge the gap between the platform and the doors. The gap fillers, which were automated when the station closed in 2017, previously required manual operation, with a foreman and at least two train crew, all of whom could directly see each other. The train crew had to give a signal to the foreman, who pulled a 4 to 5 feet (1.2 to 1.5 m) tall wooden lever to manually extend and retract the gap fillers. The gap fillers were also unreliable, as they needed an average of 15 days of maintenance for every 6 months in service.

The platform featured an oak ticket booth and an oak-cased clock from the Self Winding Clock Company. Evidence of the now-demolished ticket booth is a Beaux Arts design engraved on the ceiling. The platform also features station tiling by Heins & LaFarge, who designed the station plaque in a sans-serif font. The walls are made of small white rectangular tiles, except for the bottom 3 feet (0.91 m), which is marble. There are also fifteen ceramic plaques toward the top of the platform wall, all of which depict a sloop in the New York Harbor to signify the station's location and use. The top of the wall also includes festooned garlands and station monograms, in addition to ceramic trim where the wall intersects the ceiling. The station artwork on the original exit's landing is a 1990 mural, "South Sails", by former MTA Arts & Design director Sandra Bloodworth. During the 2004 Finding Of No Significant Impact for the station, it was determined that the station was eligible for National Register of Historic Places status.

The South Ferry loop station proved to be a service bottleneck. Operationally, the loop station functioned an intermediate station rather than as a true terminal, as trains would simply proceed back to Rector Street without the motorman needing to go to the reverse end of the train. Additionally, unlike most terminal stations in the system, there were neither layup tracks nor an additional track to store terminating trains, and there were no additional layup tracks along the line until at least 34th Street–Penn Station. This meant that trains could not dwell at the station for longer for 90 seconds (including the 5 to 10 seconds each that it took to extend and retract the gap fillers). Any trains that went out of passenger service at the station could have caused major delays along the rest of the line. Finally, trains could only proceed through the station at slow speeds, adding 30 to 60 seconds to travel time compared to a "regular" terminal station with two tracks and a full-length platform. This ensured that 1 trains were delayed at the Chambers Street station, three stops north, for up to two minutes in both directions.

==== Inner platform ====
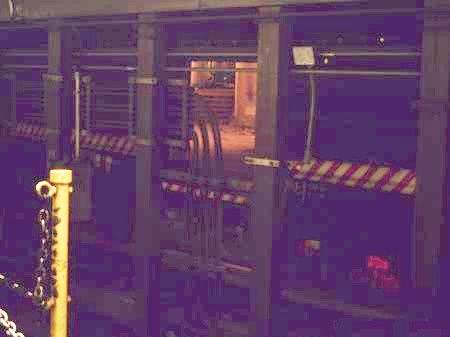
The closed inner platform as seen from the outer platform

The inner platform opened for IRT Lexington Avenue Line passengers on July 1, 1918, to serve trains on the newly opened Broadway–Seventh Avenue Line. This platform has an even sharper curve than the outer platform, and only the center doors opened here, with special arched openings in a wall between the platform and track at the locations of the doors. No regular service has been at the inner loop station since 1977, although the inner track is still used as a turning loop for 5 trains when they terminate at Bowling Green on weekday evenings and weekends. Passengers had to pay another fare when transferring from one loop to the other. Some older maps would depict the two loops as a single station complex, but later maps including the 1958 George Salomon design and the 1972 Massimo Vignelli design depicted each loop as distinct stations.

=== South Ferry station (2009–2012, 2017–present) ===
South Ferry
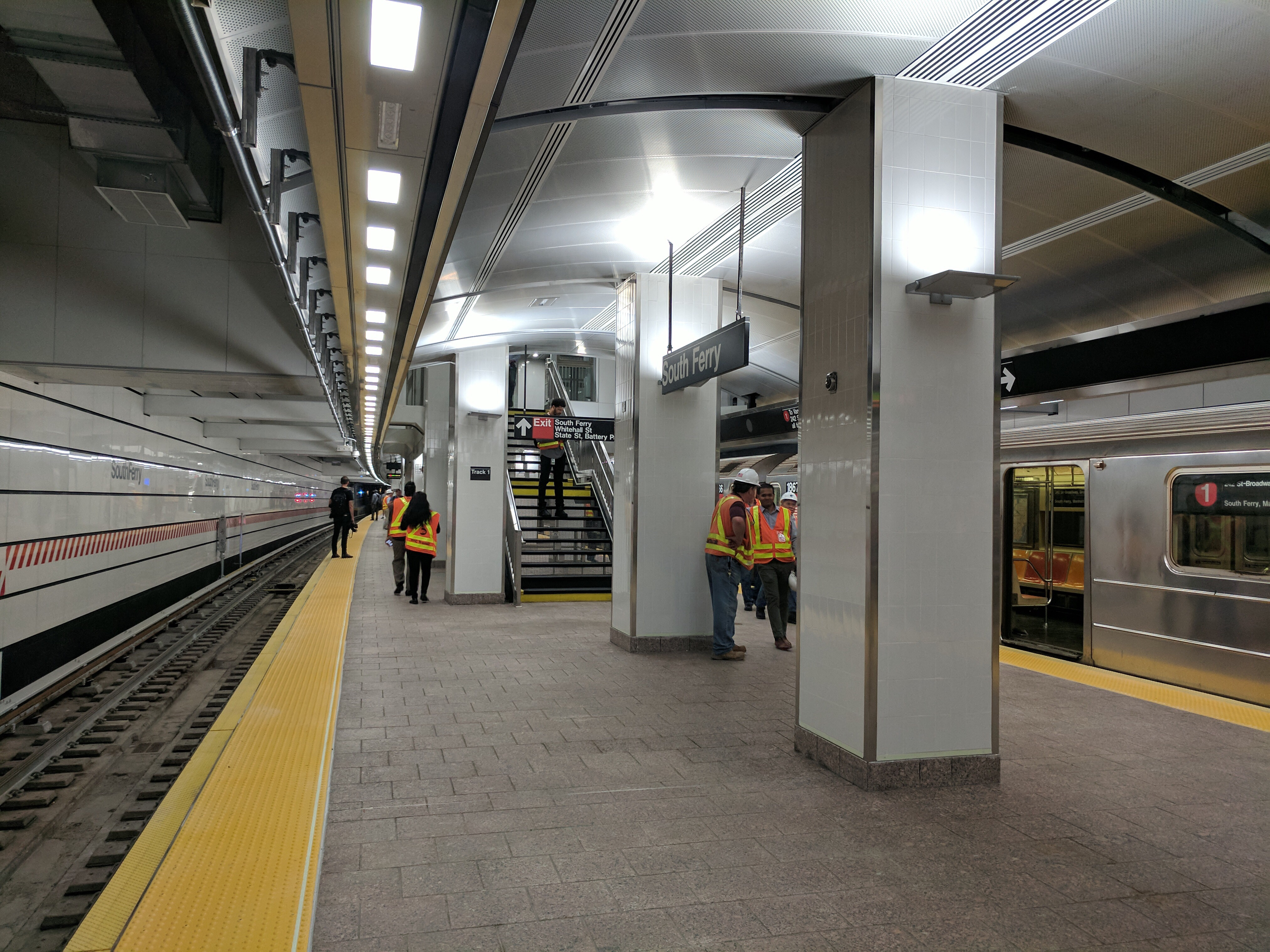
- A 1 train at the platform on reopening day

Station statistics
- Division: A (IRT)
- Line: IRT Broadway–Seventh Avenue Line
- Services: 1 (all times)
- Structure: Underground
- Platforms: 1 island platform
- Tracks: 2

Other information
- Opened: March 16, 2009; 17 years ago
- Closed: October 28, 2012; 14 years ago
- Rebuilt: June 27, 2017; 9 years ago
- Accessible: Yes
Services
Preceding station	New York City Subway	Following station
Rector Street toward Van Cortlandt Park–242nd Street	1 (New York City Subway service)	Terminus
Track layout
Station service legend
Symbol	Description
Stops all times	Stops all times

The South Ferry station on the IRT Broadway–Seventh Avenue Line is the only IRT platform in use and is served by 1 trains at all times. The station is the southern terminus of the 1 train; the next stop to the north is Rector Street. The new station was built as a two-track, 10-car-long island platform on a less severe curve, permitting the operation of a typical terminal station. The platform can fit a full-length train without significant platform gaps or gap fillers. The two tracks end at bumper blocks at the south end of the platform. The loop station was relegated to being used for turn-arounds once the new station opened. Unlike the loop station, this station is accessible only by IRT Broadway–Seventh Avenue Line local trains and does not connect with the Lexington Avenue Line.

The MTA stated that the new station saved four to six minutes of a passenger's trip time and increased the peak capacity of the 1 service to 24 trains per hour (or one every 2 minutes 30 seconds), as opposed to 16 to 17 trains per hour (or one every 4 minutes) with the loop station. The successor station is fully accessible (although its transfer to the BMT Broadway Line is not), with the main entrance located across from the Staten Island Ferry terminal building's entrance.

The new station offers three street entrances, with the main entrance located across from the Staten Island Ferry terminal; the loop station originally had only one entrance within the terminal itself before it reopened with a connection to the South Ferry–Whitehall Street complex in 2013. The new station allowed a free transfer to the BMT station, whereas neither of the loop station's platforms originally did. Despite being one of the newest New York City Subway stations, the South Ferry station cannot accommodate platform screen doors; according to an internal study prepared for the MTA in 2020, the south end of the platform is too narrow to fit a set of platform doors.

==== Artwork ====
A portion of the wall excavated during the station's construction was embedded permanently into the wall of the station's entrance. According to Robert Tierney, chairman of the New York City Landmarks Preservation Commission, the wall may be a remnant of the gun batteries that occupied Battery Park during the late 17th and early 18th centuries. The city and the New York City Transit Authority worked together to preserve the remains, which were described as "an important remnant of the history of New York City."

The station's mezzanine features an artwork titled See it split, see it change, which consists of fused glass wall, stone mosaic, and a stainless steel fence. The artwork, by Doug and Mike Starn, depicts Manhattan topography and was installed in the mezzanine over three years. Costing $1 million, it was the most expensive MTA Arts for Transit work ever installed at the time.

=== Gallery ===
Old station

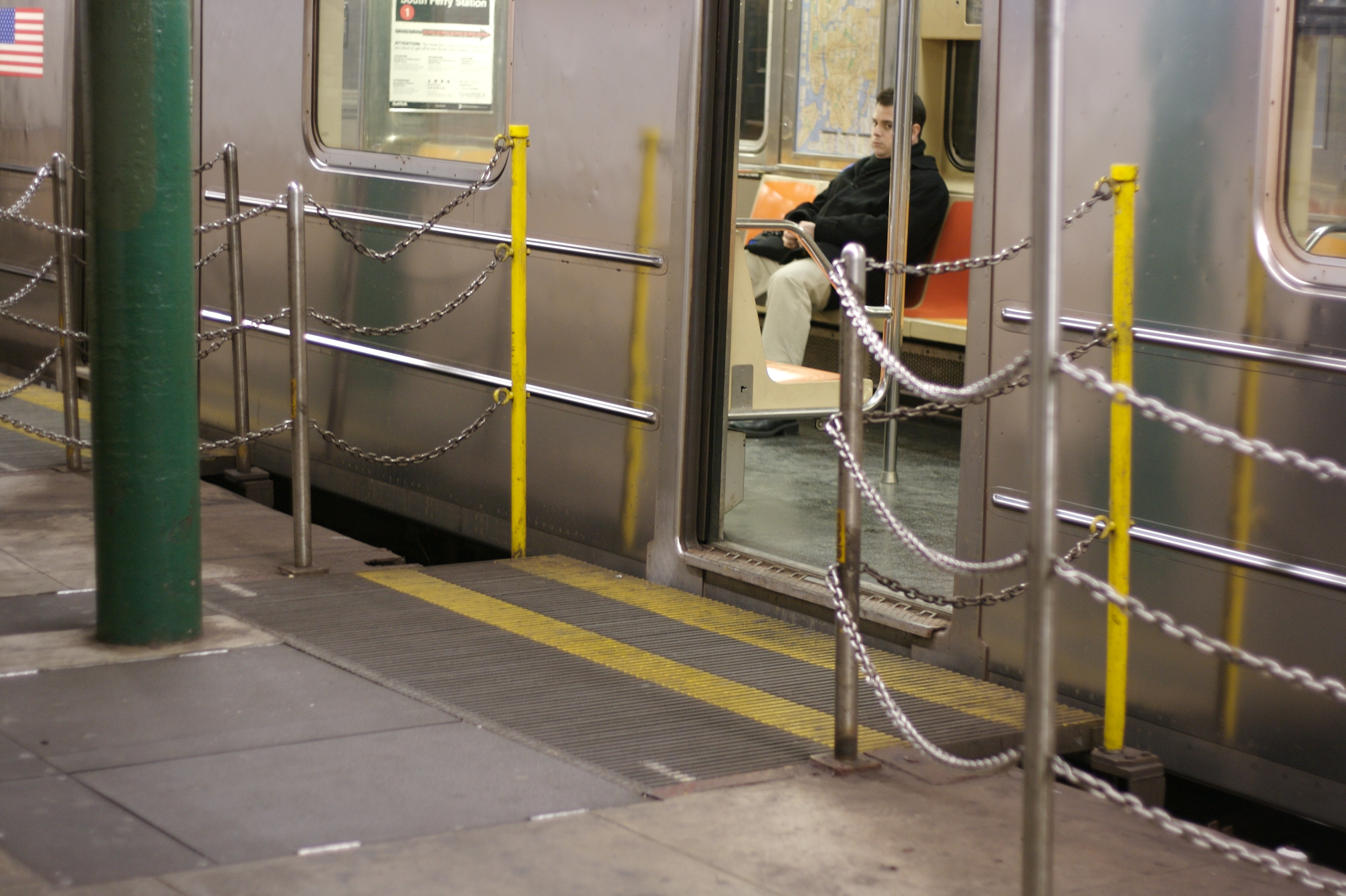
Movable gap filler at station

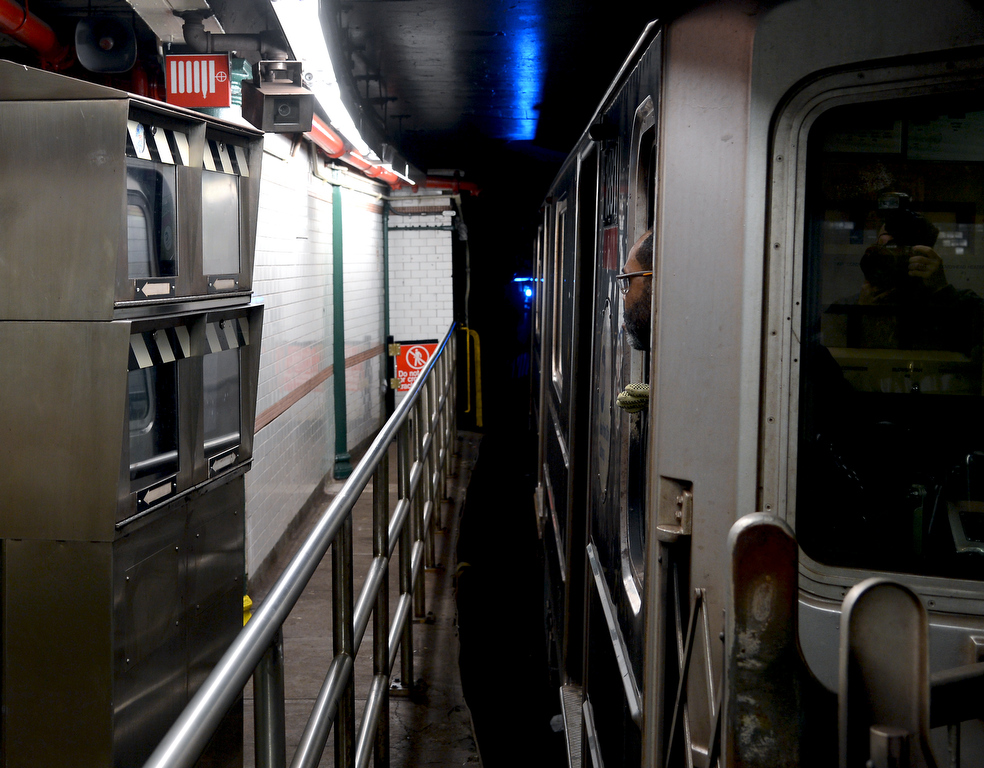
Conductor controls the whole length of the curved platform using monitors

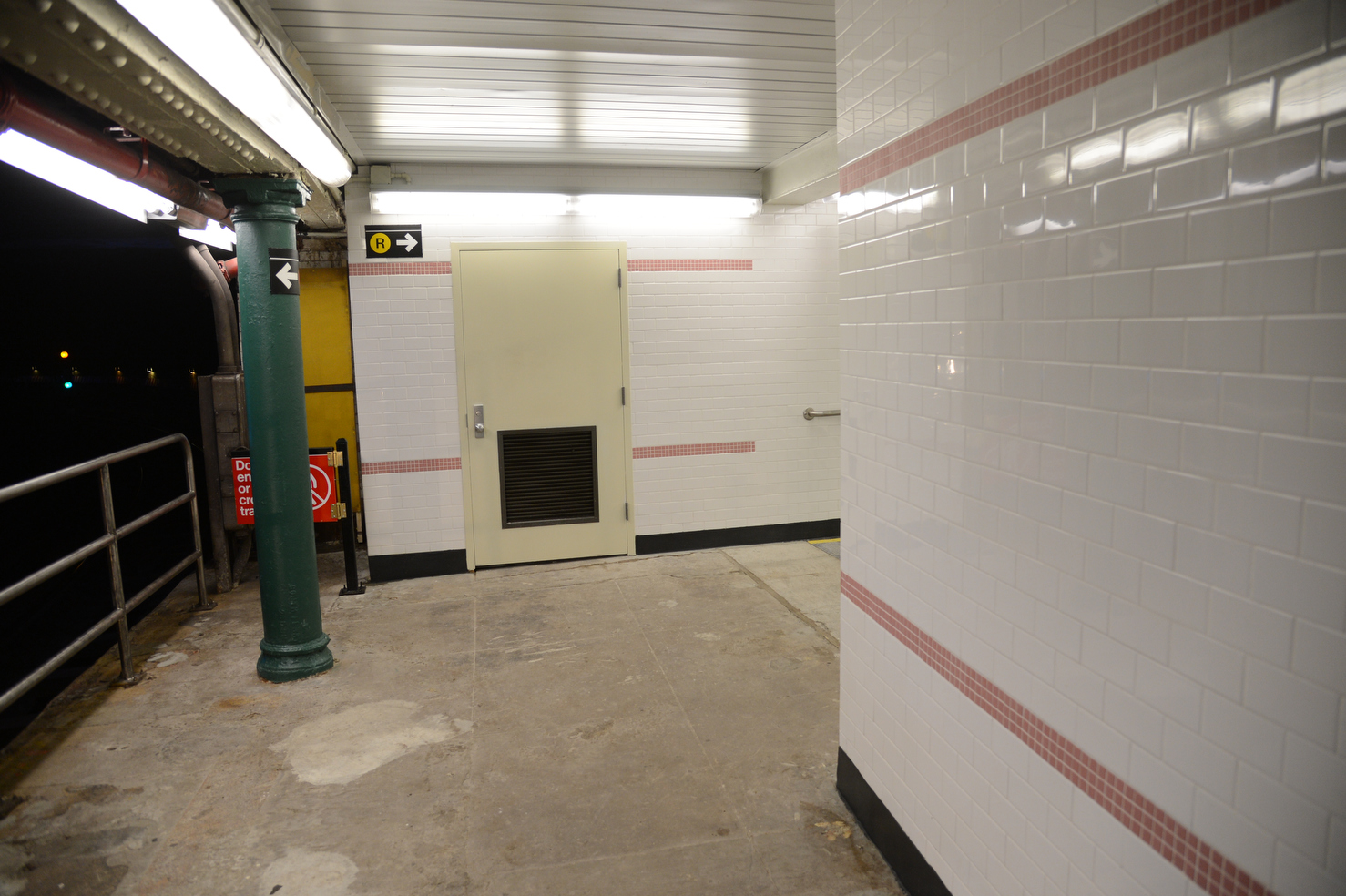
Passageway to BMT platforms as seen from end of loop platform
Old station's mosaics

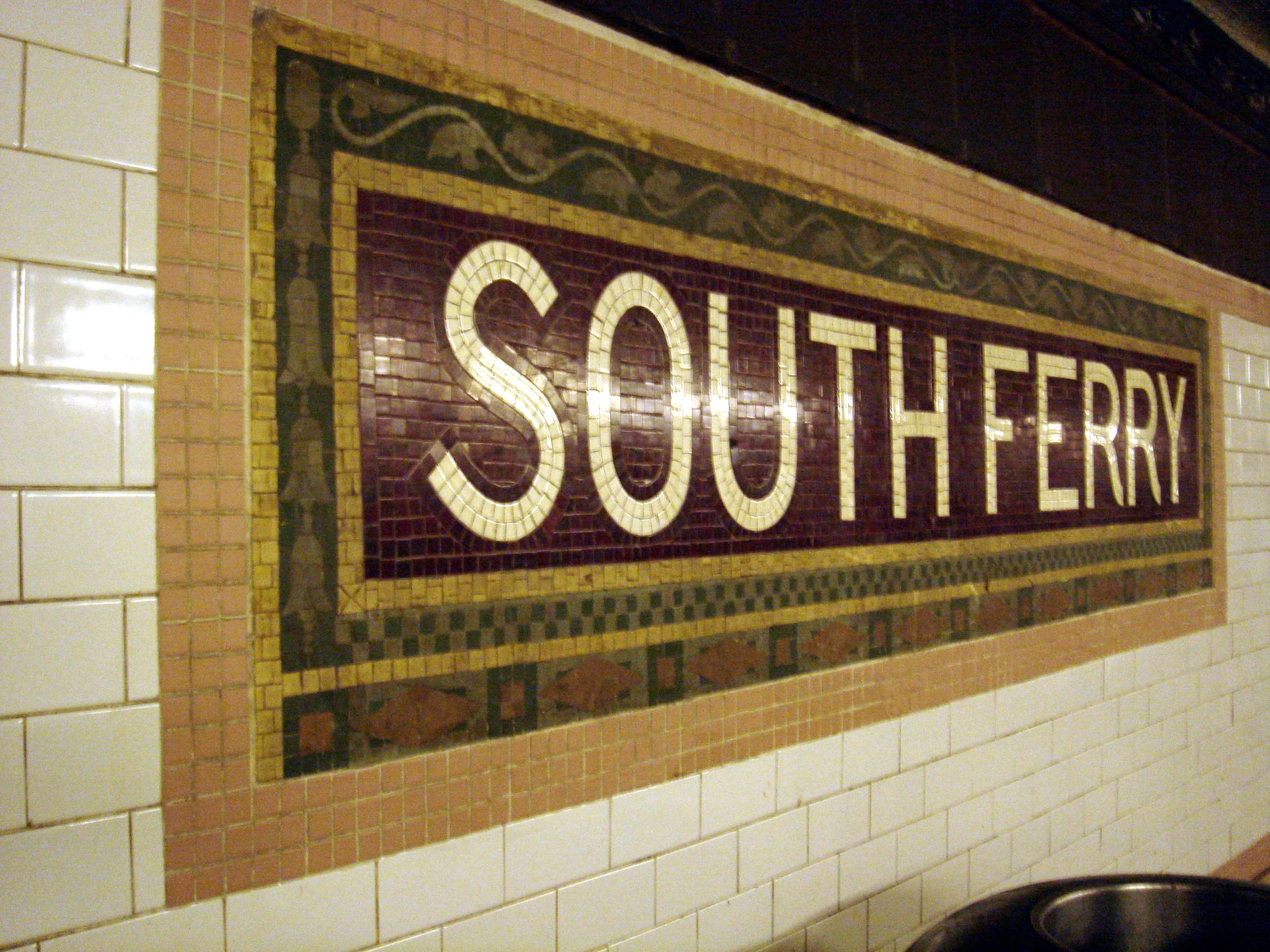
Mosaic tile name tablet

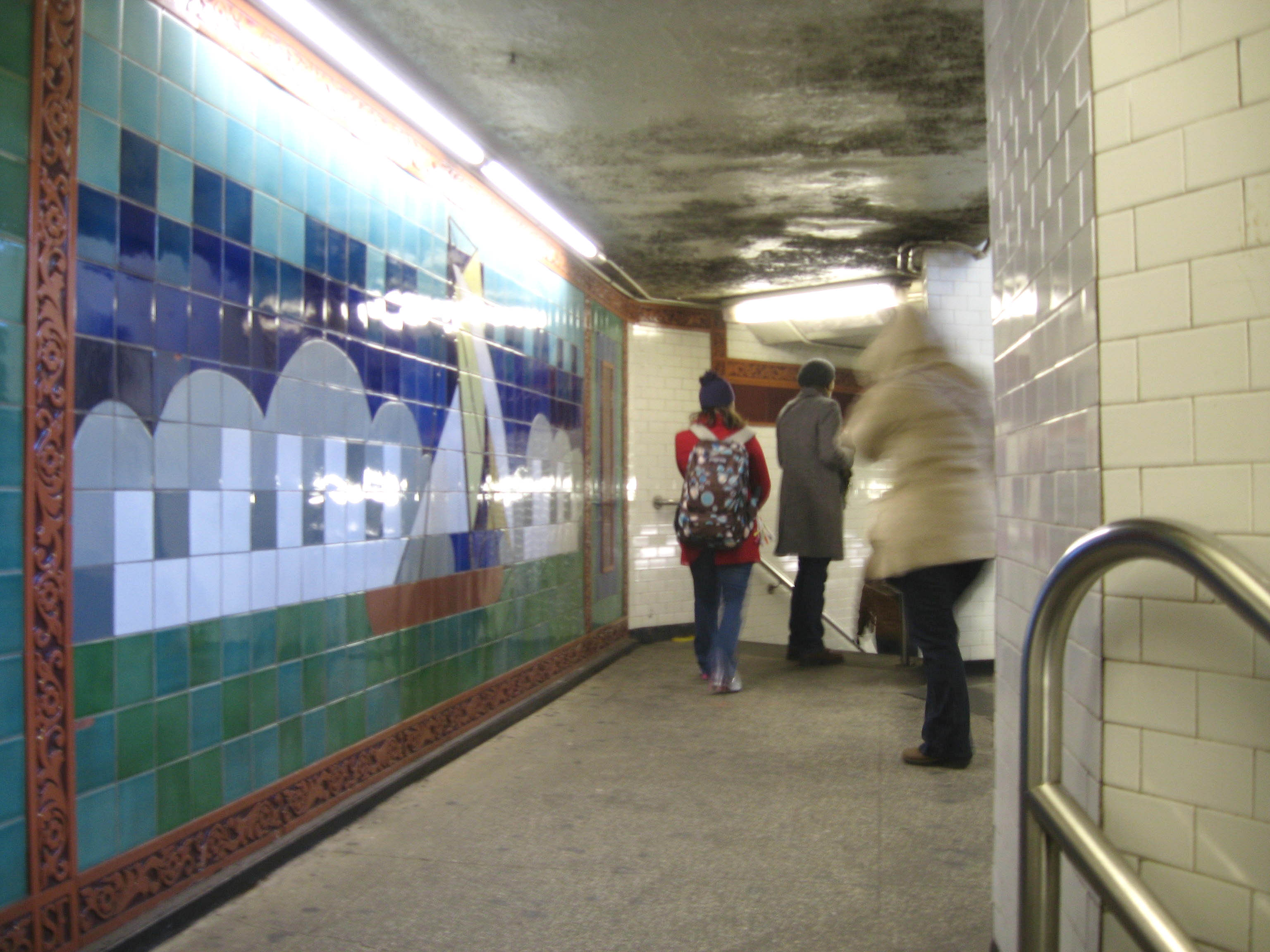
Artwork on the left

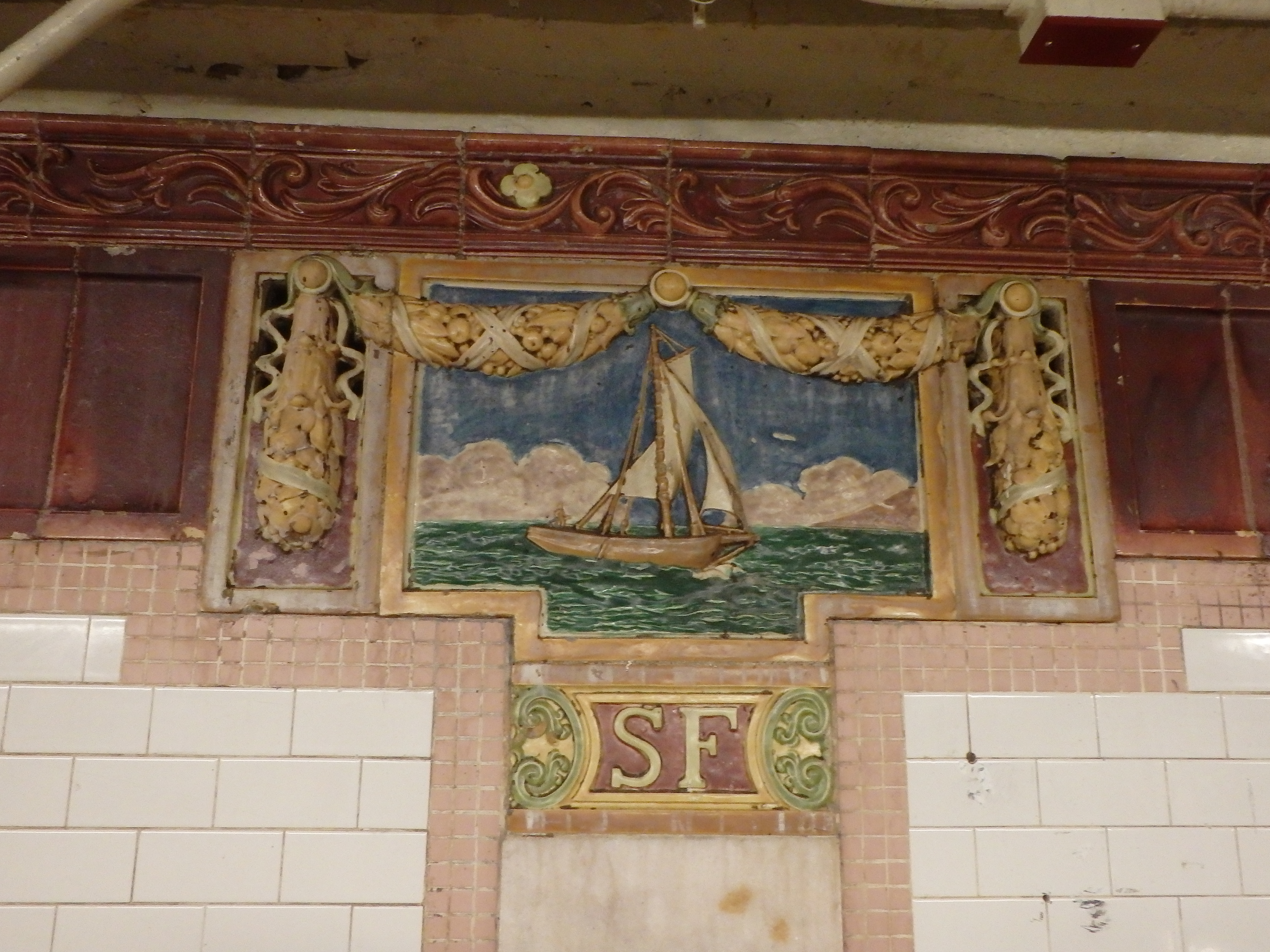
One of the many boat mosaics within the station
New station

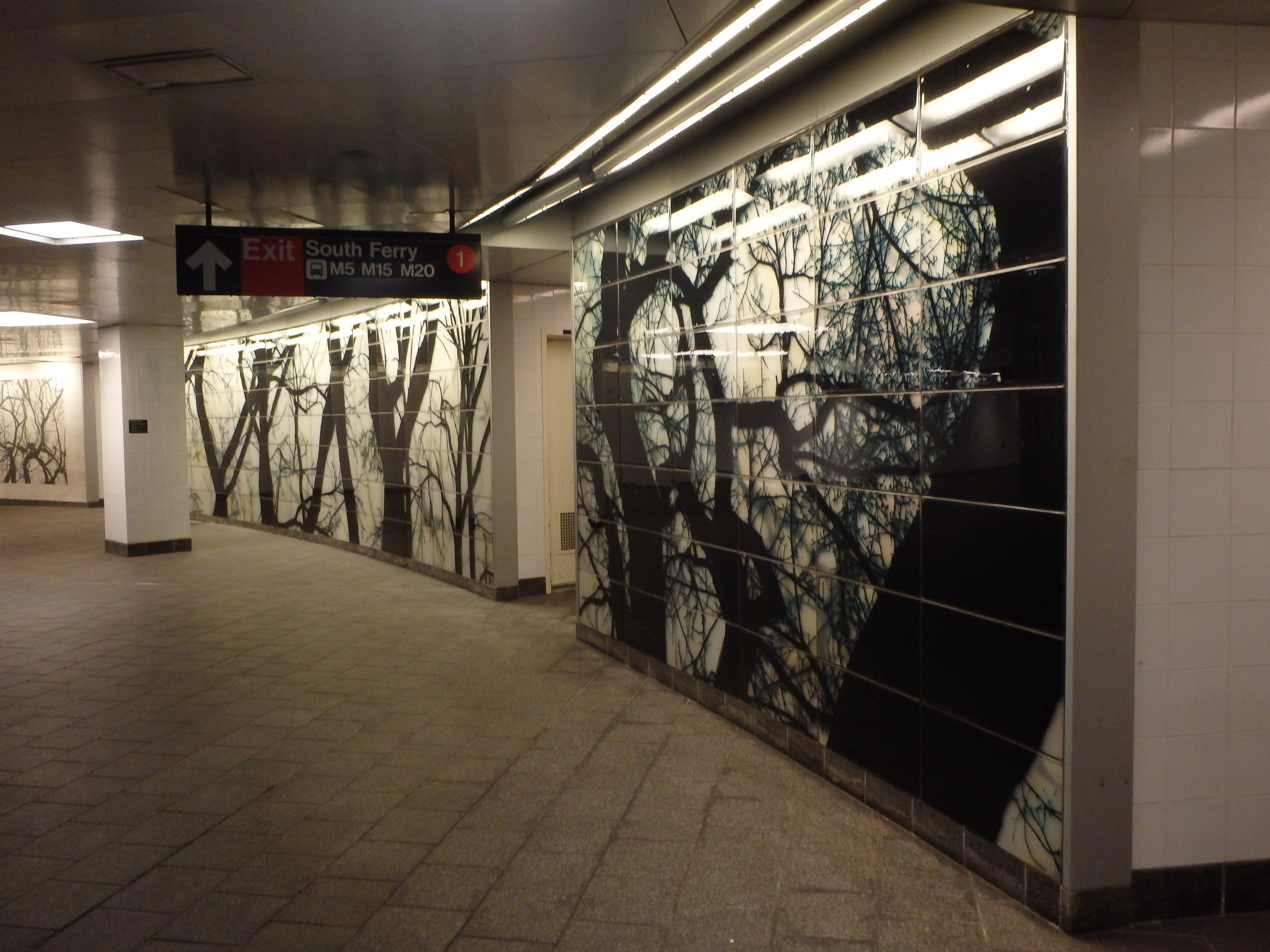
Glass mural by Doug and Mike Starn

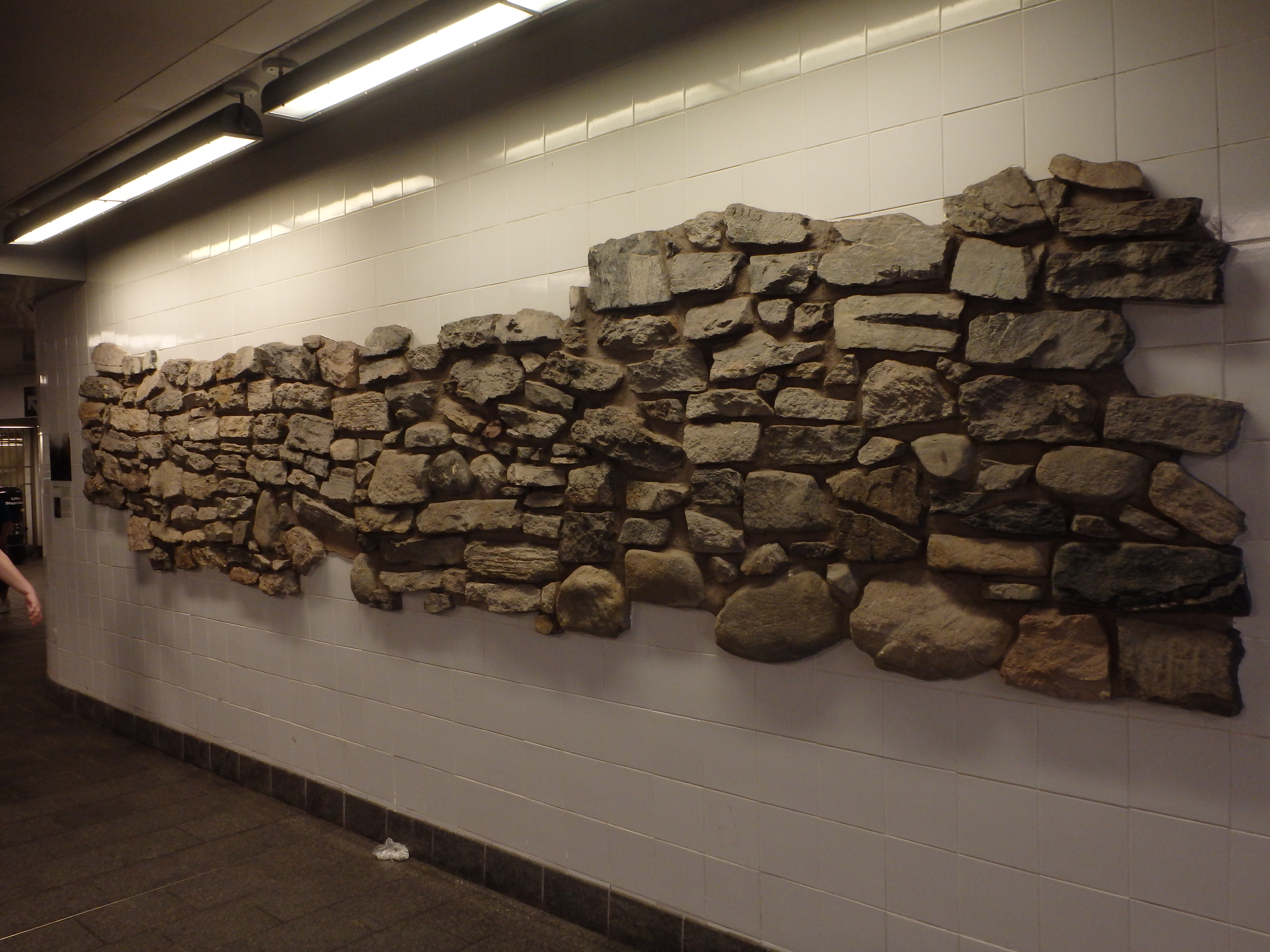
Excavated wall

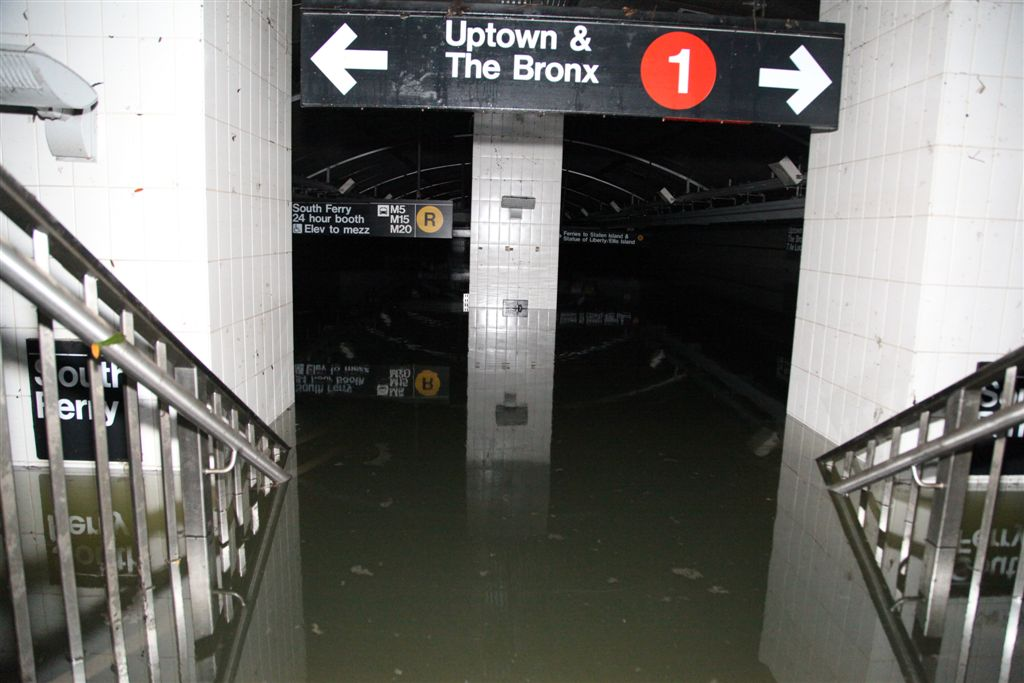
Flooded station after Hurricane Sandy

== BMT Broadway Line platforms ==
Whitehall Street–South Ferry
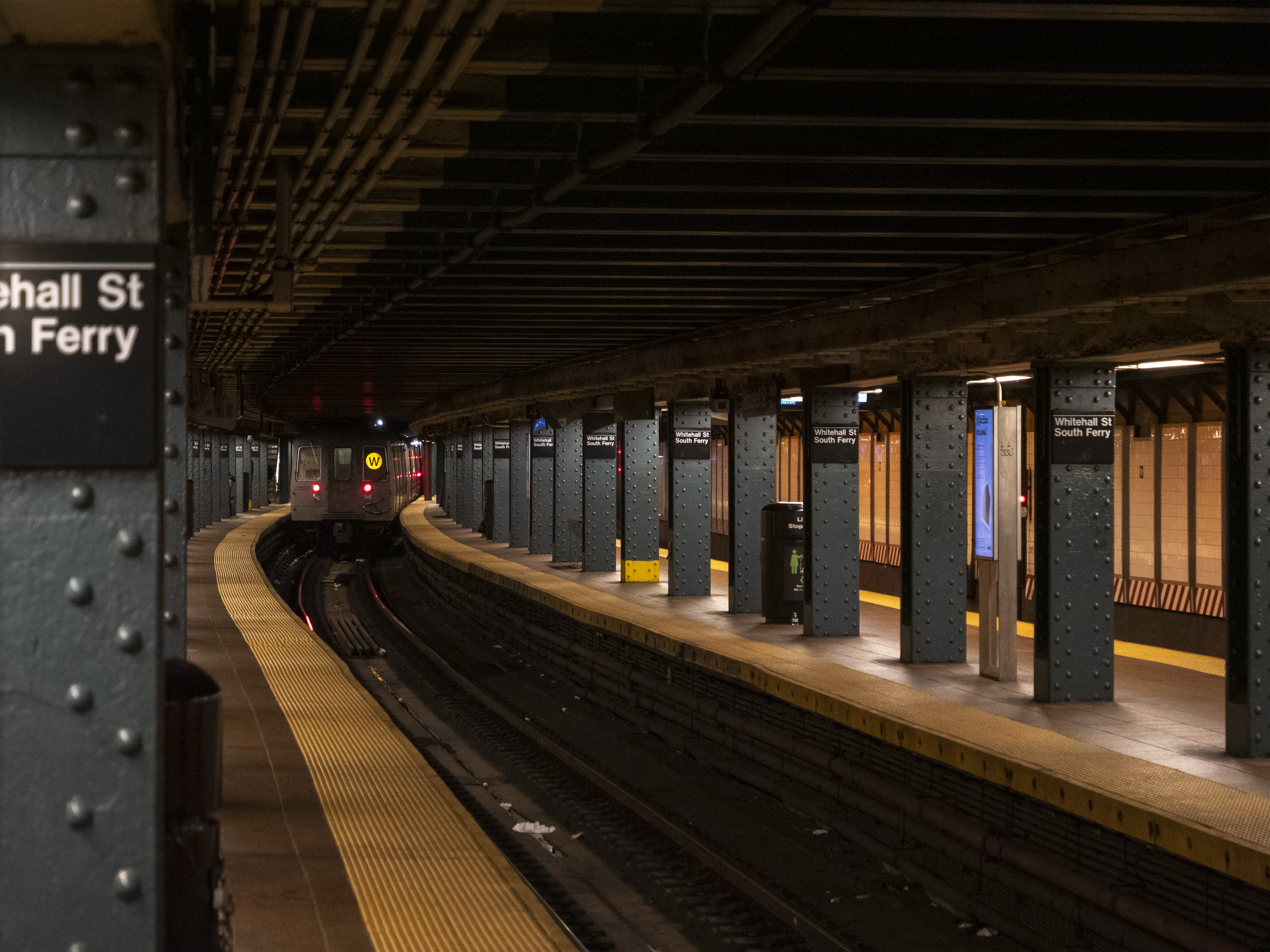
- Middle track with W train departing

Station statistics
- Division: B (BMT)
- Line: BMT Broadway Line
- Services: N (late nights); R (all times); W (weekdays only)
- Structure: Underground
- Platforms: 2 island platforms cross-platform interchange
- Tracks: 3

Other information
- Opened: September 20, 1918; 108 years ago
- Accessible: Partially; access to mezzanine only, platforms not accessible
- Former/other names: Whitehall Street
Services
Preceding station	New York City Subway	Following station
Rector Street N R W via Lexington Avenue–59th Street	R (New York City Subway service)	Court Street N R W toward Bay Ridge–95th Street
Rector Street N R W via Lexington Avenue–59th Street	W (New York City Subway service)	Terminus
Track layout
Station service legend
Symbol	Description
Stops all times	Stops all times
Stops all times except late nights	Stops all times except late nights
Stops weekdays during the day	Stops weekdays during the day
Stops late nights only	Stops late nights only

The Whitehall Street–South Ferry station (announced as Whitehall Street on NTT trains) on the BMT Broadway Line is a local station with three tracks and two island platforms, and is the southernmost station on the line. The R stops here at all times; the W stops here only on weekdays during the day; and the N stops here during the night. The outer tracks, used by daytime R and nighttime N trains, continue south into the Montague Street Tunnel to the BMT Fourth Avenue Line in Brooklyn. The center track, used to terminate weekday W trains from Queens and nighttime R trains from Brooklyn, merges with the outer tracks at both ends of the station. The station is between Rector Street to the north and Court Street to the south.

The station is deep because of two factors: the line goes under the East River directly southeast of the station, and the station exists immediately to the south of the shallower Bowling Green station, which crosses the Broadway Line. The fare control area and transfer to the IRT Broadway–Seventh Avenue Line platforms are at the extreme south end of the station, with additional exits at the north end.

South of this station, a pair of bellmouths exists, allowing for a connection to a never-built East River tunnel south of the Montague Street Tunnel, going towards the proposed DeKalb Avenue bypass, using the old LIRR Atlantic Avenue Tunnel or under another street in Brooklyn. Further south is a flying junction joining from Broad Street on the BMT Nassau Street Line (no regular service).

=== Artwork ===
The mezzanines feature a mixed-media installation, Passages, created by Frank Giorgini, which details the history of the Lower Manhattan area up to the year 2000, when the work was installed. Several ceramic mosaics and reliefs line the stairwell walls. A wide mosaic mural fills the wall at the lower level mezzanine, behind a steel cattail-shaped gate. On the floor, a trail of granite fish silhouettes leads to a single bronze fish sculpture perched on a beam over the platform level.

== Notable places nearby ==
- Downtown Manhattan Heliport
- Staten Island Ferry's Whitehall Terminal
- Ferries to Statue of Liberty, Ellis Island, and Governors Island
- Other places in the neighborhood
