= Frank Giorgini =

Artist and educator (born 1947)

- Born: 9 July 1947; Copiague, New York
- Died: 16 October 2022 (aged 75)

Frank Giorgini (born 1947) was an artist and educator specializing in ceramic techniques, including tile and percussion instruments. He taught courses on architectural tile design at Parsons The New School for Design in New York.

== Mosaic tiles ==
Giorgini was commissioned by the New York Metropolitan Transportation Authority to design a mosaic for the Whitehall St. subway station. Passages was installed in 2000. His book, Handmade Tiles: Designing, Making, Decorating (ISBN 9781579902711), is a standard reference for making ceramic tiles.

== Hand percussion instruments ==
He studied the traditional ceramic techniques of Nigeria. In collaboration with percussionist Jamey Haddad developed a modern Udu drum. Some of his hand-made drums are in the permanent collection of the Metropolitan Museum of Art in New York.

== Personal life and education ==
Frank Giorgini grew up at his parents house at 40 Verrazano Ave Copiague, New York in 1947 and Graduated From Copiague High School in 1965 and then went for his bachelors in Education and his in masters in arts.
