= Unused New York City Subway service labels =

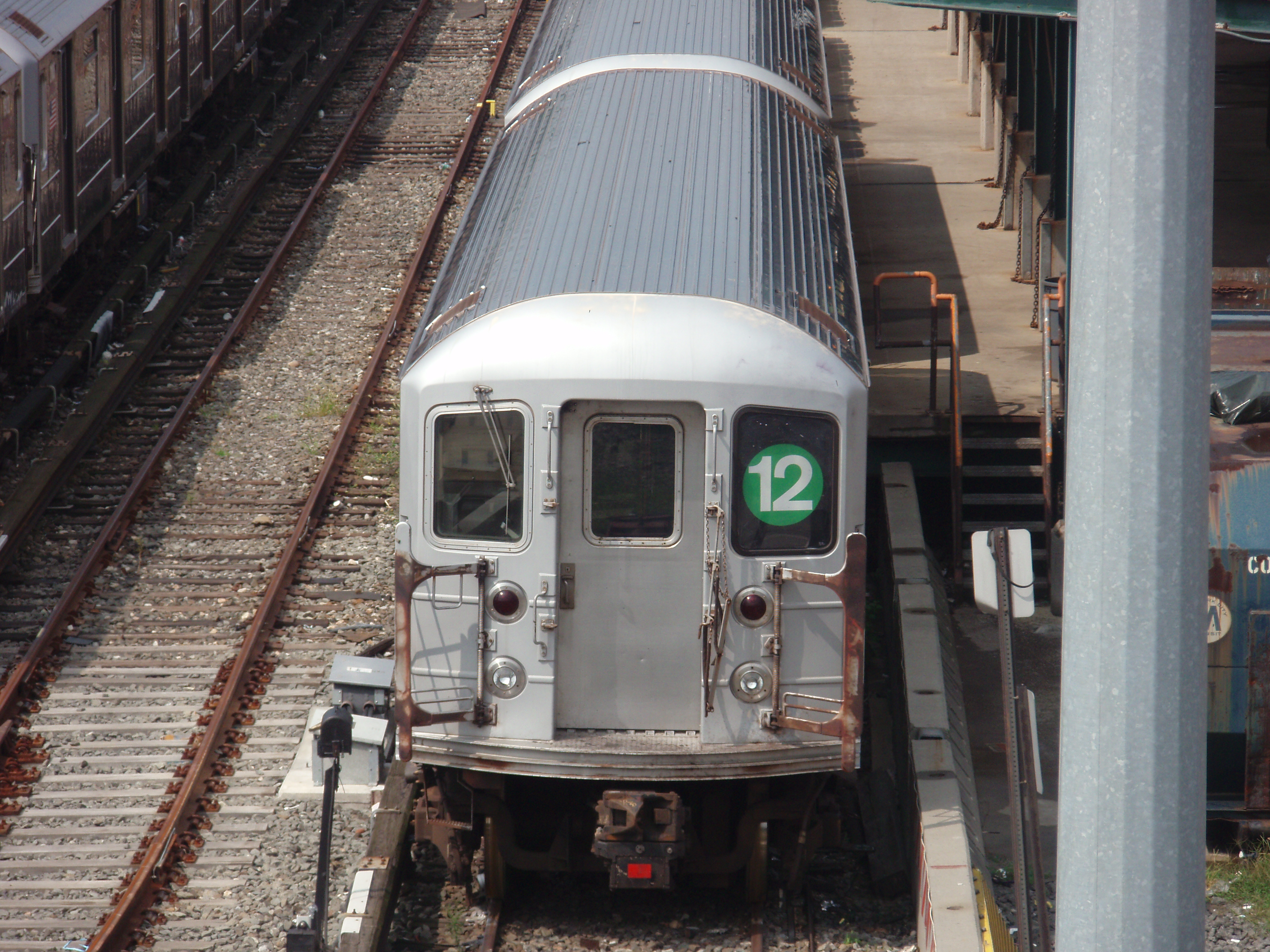
An R62A car in Corona Yard displays a 12 sign in the apple green color representing the IRT Lexington Avenue Line.

The New York City Subway currently uses various letters and numbers to designate the routes that trains use over the differing lines in the system. Along with the color corresponding to the route's trunk line, these form a unique identifier for the route, easing navigation through the complex system. Several service labels have either been phased out or never been used. This list covers the labels not used as of June 2021.

== A Division numbers ==
The A Division uses single-digit numbers for each route. Currently, numbers 1 through 7 are in use.

- 0, while not used publicly, is used as the internal designation of the 42nd Street Shuttle.
- 8 was last used for the Bronx portion of the Third Avenue El from 1967 to 1973 (when it was demolished). Previously it was used by the IRT to designate their route that used the Astoria Line, which was originally jointly operated with the BMT prior to 1949. Additionally, it appears on the rollsigns of some trains as a green 8.
- 9 was last used for skip-stop service on the IRT Broadway–Seventh Avenue Line from 1989 to 2005. Previously, it was used as the designator for the IRT Dyre Avenue Line shuttle between 1941 and 1966.

Two-digit numbers have never been used by the A Division, but have been seen on the current rollsigns of some trains, paired with colors used with other services. It is likely that these were assigned arbitrarily, for use if the MTA changed the additional rush hour express service designators from a "diamond" version of the regular number to a separate number.

Two-digit bullets include:

- A green 10 for the IRT Lexington Avenue Line
- A purple 11 for the IRT Flushing Line
- A green 12 for the IRT Lexington Avenue Line
- A red 13 for the IRT Broadway–Seventh Avenue Line
Unused bullets on rollsigns

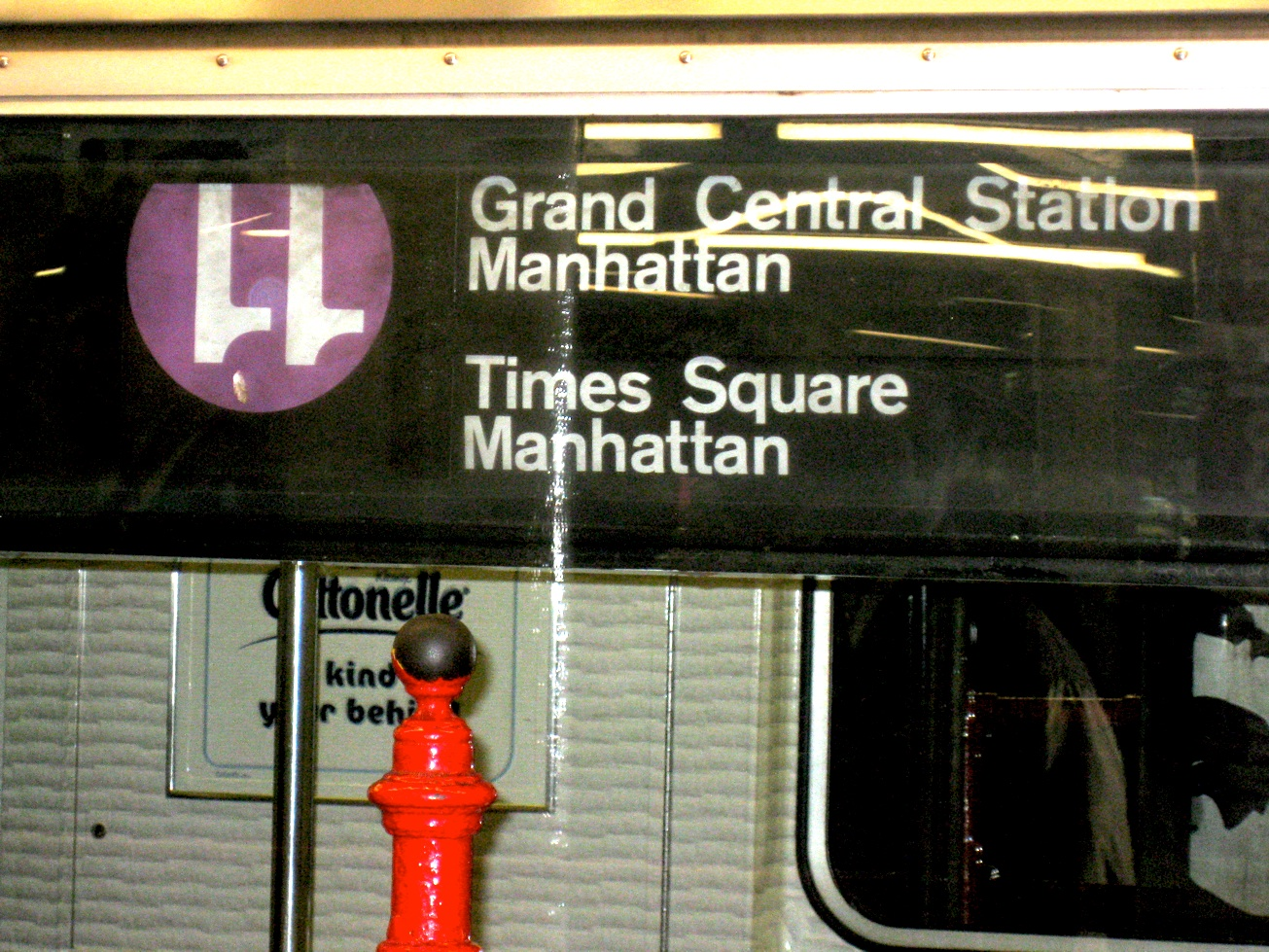
An R62A-class car operating on the 42nd Street Shuttle erroneously shows an upside down 11 sign instead of the usual, gray-backgrounded S for shuttles. The purple color currently corresponds to the IRT Flushing Line.

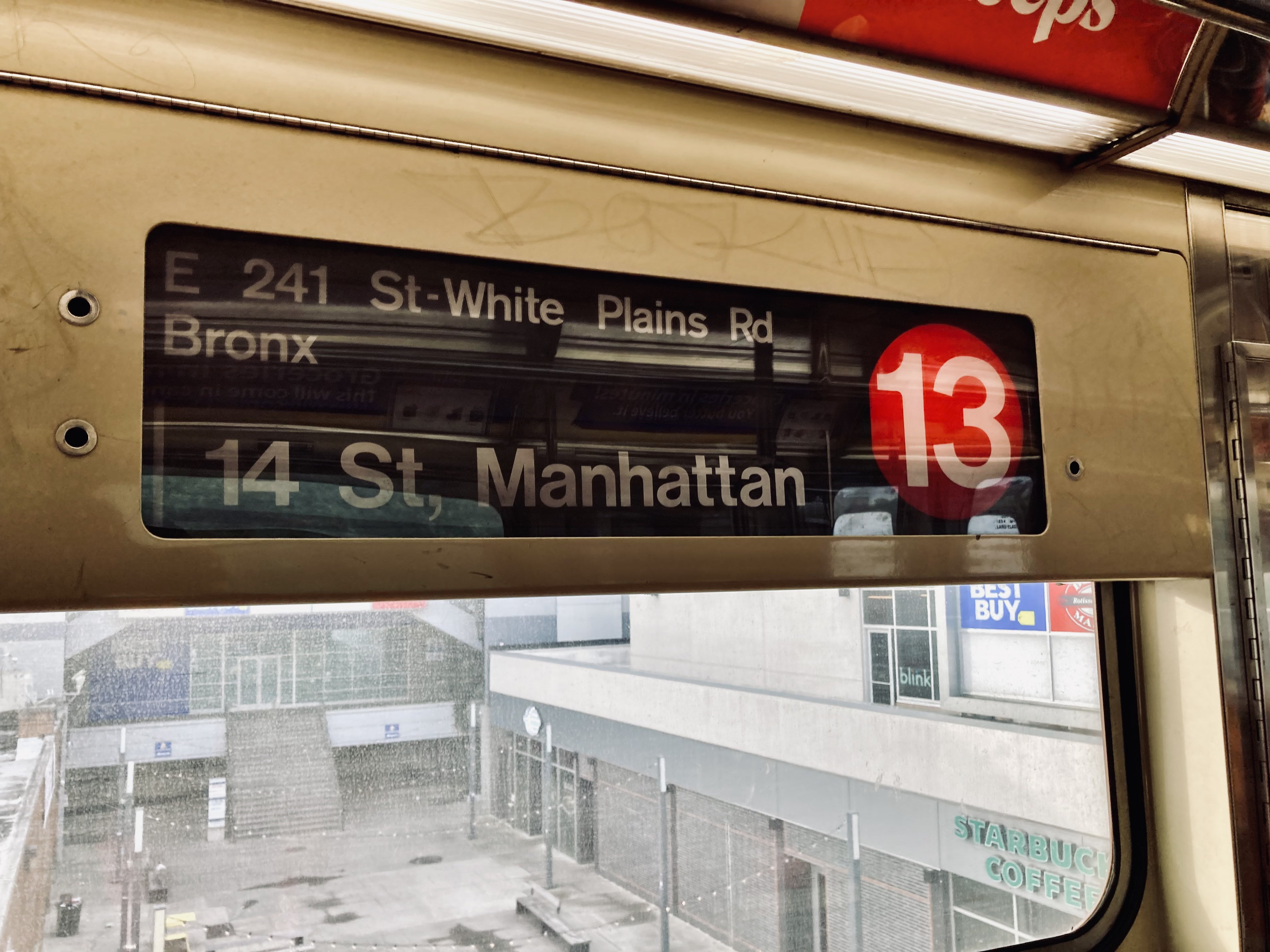
An R62A car with its side sign displaying the 13 bullet in red, corresponding to the IRT Seventh Avenue Line.
Unused A division bullets

== B Division letters ==
Trains of the B Division use single letters of the English alphabet. These service letters are unused, but some have been used or proposed for services at various points in time:

- H is the internal route designator for the Rockaway Park Shuttle. It was used publicly until 1993, when the public route emblem was changed to S. Since then, the shuttle has only been referred to as H in internal documents. It was last used publicly for a fare-free shuttle service in the Rockaways, started in November 2012 after damage caused by Hurricane Sandy rendered normal S shuttle and A train services in the area inoperable. This temporary H service lasted until May 2013, when full service on both routes to the Rockaways was restored. While the H train has (seemingly erroneously) always been shown in a blue bullet, the later S indicator was shown on maps in both gray and blue bullets over the years, but most recently has only been displayed in gray. This is likely because the Rockaway Park shuttle never leaves Queens and thus does not use the IND 8th Avenue Line like other lines with blue bullets; changing the bullet color to gray corrected this error.
- I has never been used due to its visual similarity to the number 1.
- K was last used for a planned BMT Canarsie Line skip-stop train in 1991, appearing on the R110B rollsign as a gray bullet, before the idea was abandoned. Before that, it was used as an Eighth Avenue Line local train, which was discontinued in 1988. Prior to that it was used for a 6th Avenue Line local service via the Chrystie Street Connection.
- O has never been used due to its visual similarity to the number 0.
- P was planned for the service operating on the final leg of the BMT Culver Line before it was downgraded to a shuttle. Later, the P was proposed again as a nonstop between Sutphin Boulevard–Archer Ave (at the LIRR's Jamaica station) and 34th Street–Penn Station, continuing locally to 168th Street, via the BMT Archer Avenue Line, BMT Jamaica Line, Chrystie Street Connection, IND Sixth Avenue Line and IND Eighth Avenue Line (switching to the latter at West Fourth Street) in the 1990s. This would have been used during a threatened Amtrak strike that would have prevented LIRR trains from entering Penn Station. The letter has never actually been used, as it sounds like the word "pea" or the slang term "pee" (a colloquialism for urine).
- T was used for BMT West End Line services, but was quickly replaced by the expanded B service after routes were reorganized following the opening of the Chrystie Street Connection. T is the planned label for the full-length Second Avenue Subway service.
- U has never been used, as it sounds like the word "you".
- V was introduced in December 2001 for weekday local service on the IND Queens Boulevard Line and IND Sixth Avenue Line via 53rd Street, after the F train was shifted to the newly opened IND 63rd Street Line. V service was discontinued in June 2010 due to budgetary concerns, being replaced entirely (except for service to the Second Avenue station) by a rerouted M train.
- X is used as a placeholder for routes under development.
- Y has never been used, as it sounds like the word "why".
- The JFK Express's bullet, featuring an airplane symbol inside a turquoise circle, was used from 1978 until 1990.

Prior to May 1985, the B Division used two-letter combinations to indicate differing variations of similar services, but these were phased out in favor of single-letter designators.

The letters H, K, and V can be seen on the rollsigns of some older model subway cars, with colors paired to the last primary trunk line they were assigned to. The letters P, T, U, X and Y could last be seen on R32 side rollsigns as a black letter inside a white circle.

Unused bullets on rollsigns

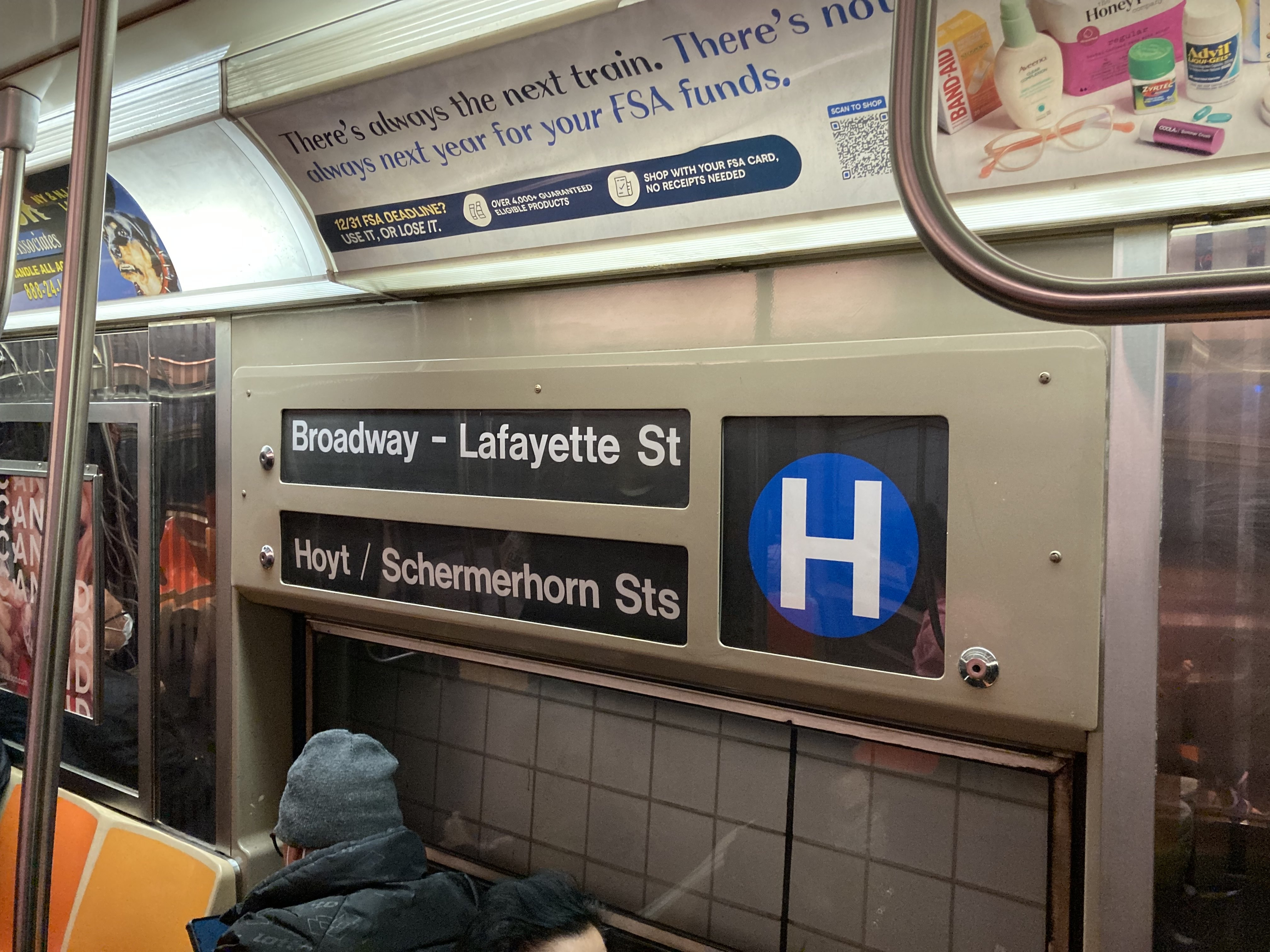
An R68 operating erroneously displays the blue H train bullet for the Rockaway shuttle.

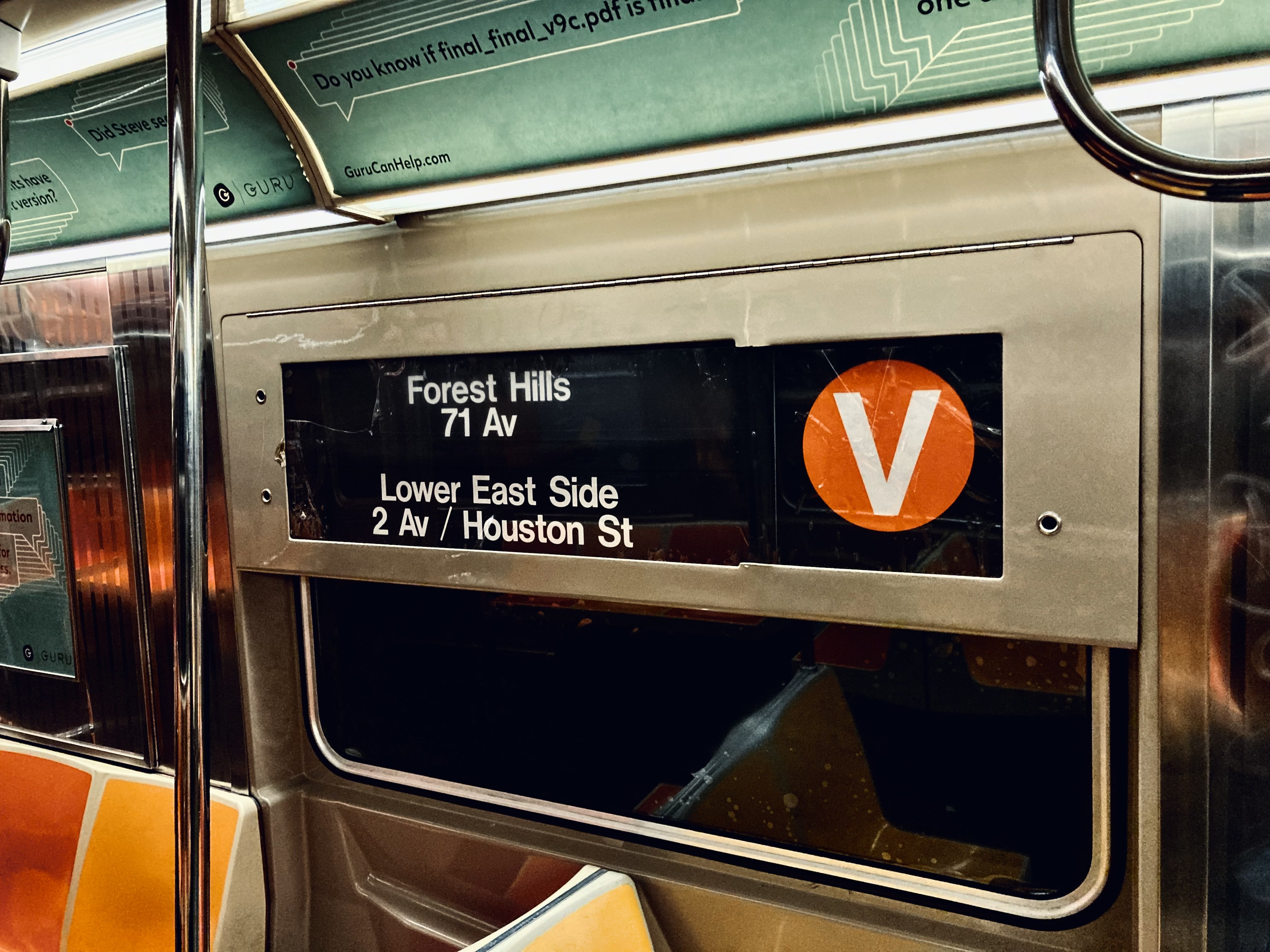
An R68A displays the V train's old bullet and destinations. Most rollsigns retain a V bullet.

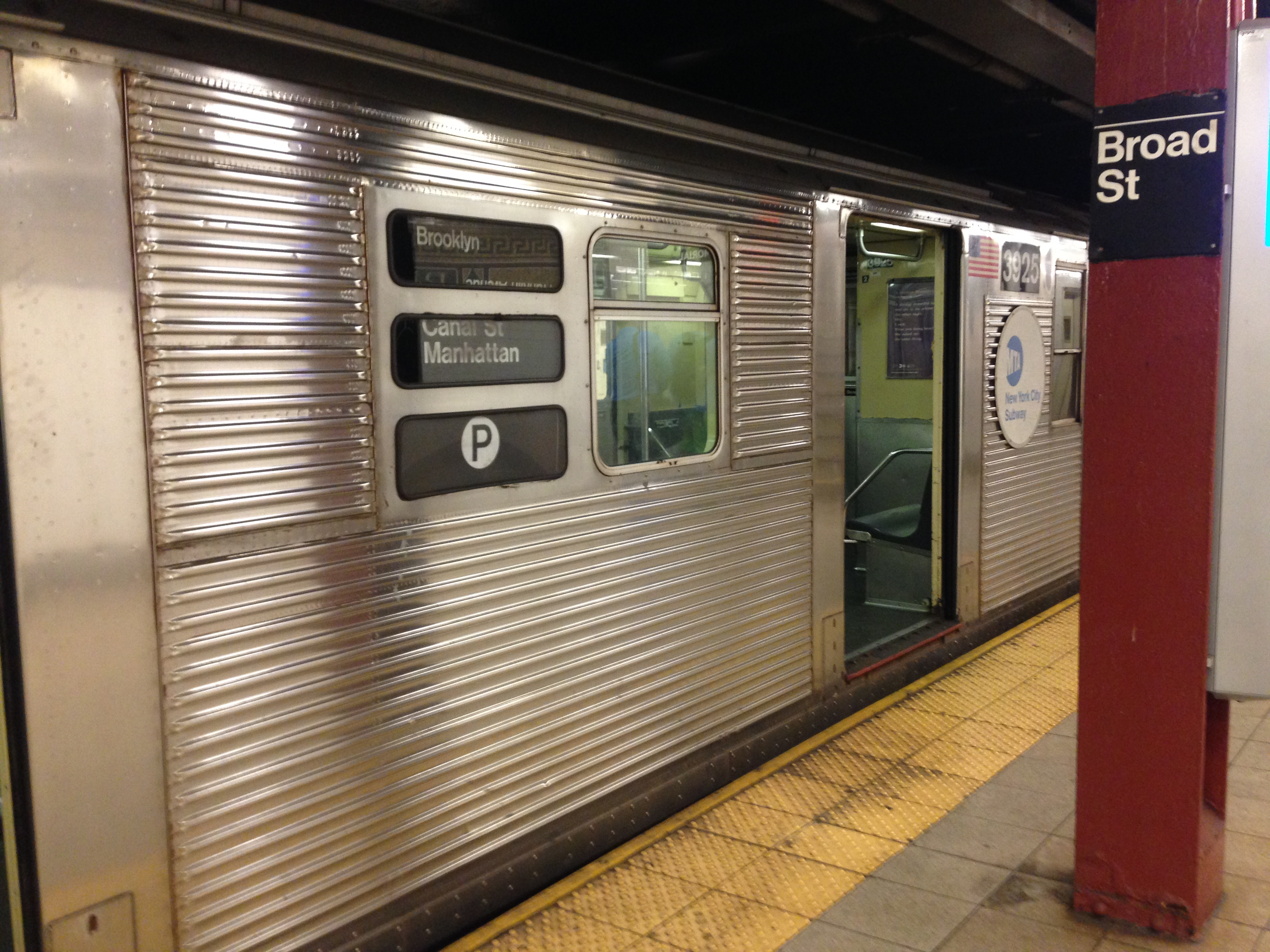
An R32 train erroneously displaying a P sign instead of the proper J

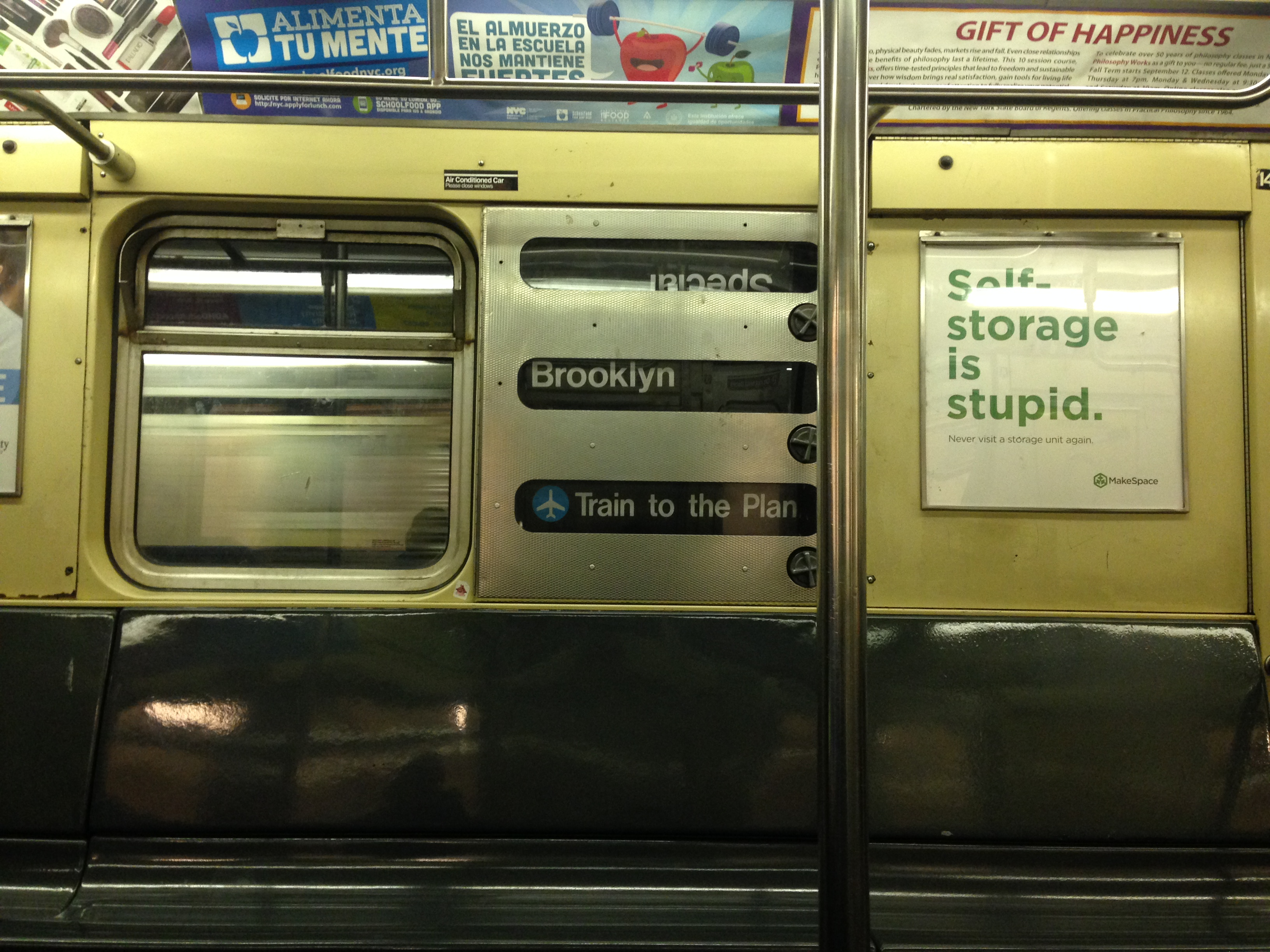
An R32 rollsign erroneously displaying the JFK Express logo. This service was used from September 1978 to April 1990 for limited super-express service to JFK Airport.
Unused B division bullets

== See also ==
- New York City Subway nomenclature
- List of New York City Subway lines
- List of New York City Subway services
- List of New York City Subway stations
