= List of New York City Subway services =

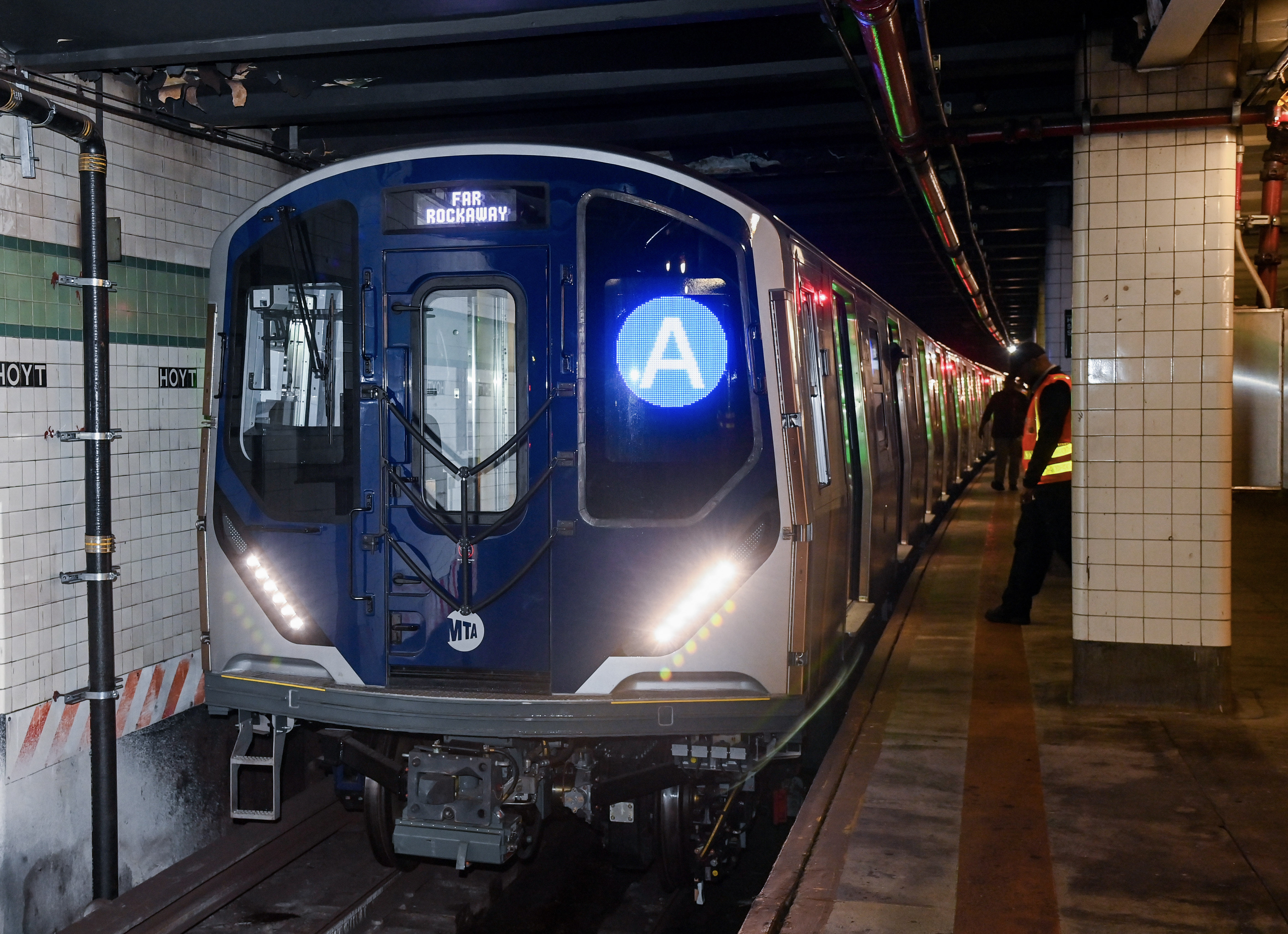
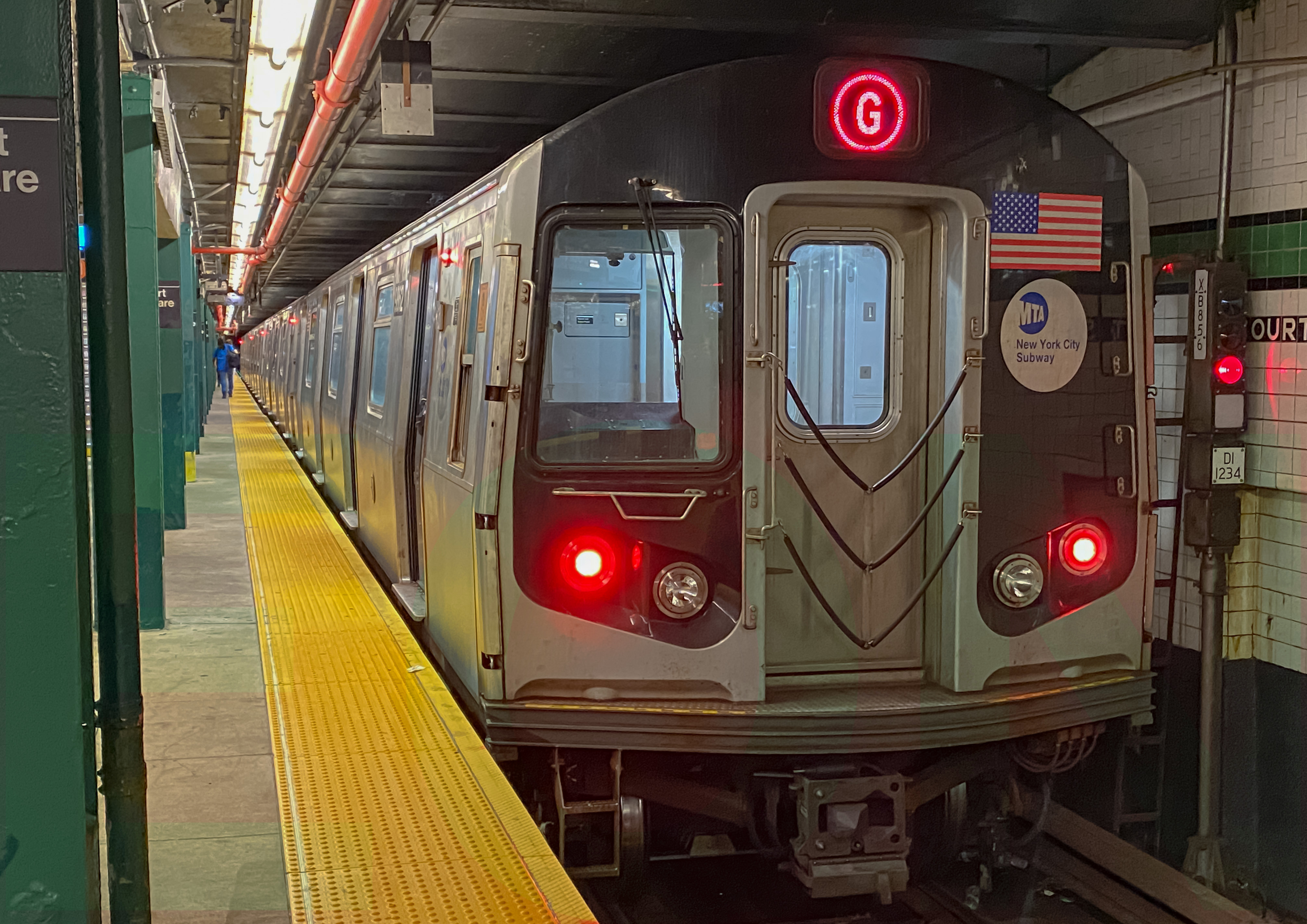
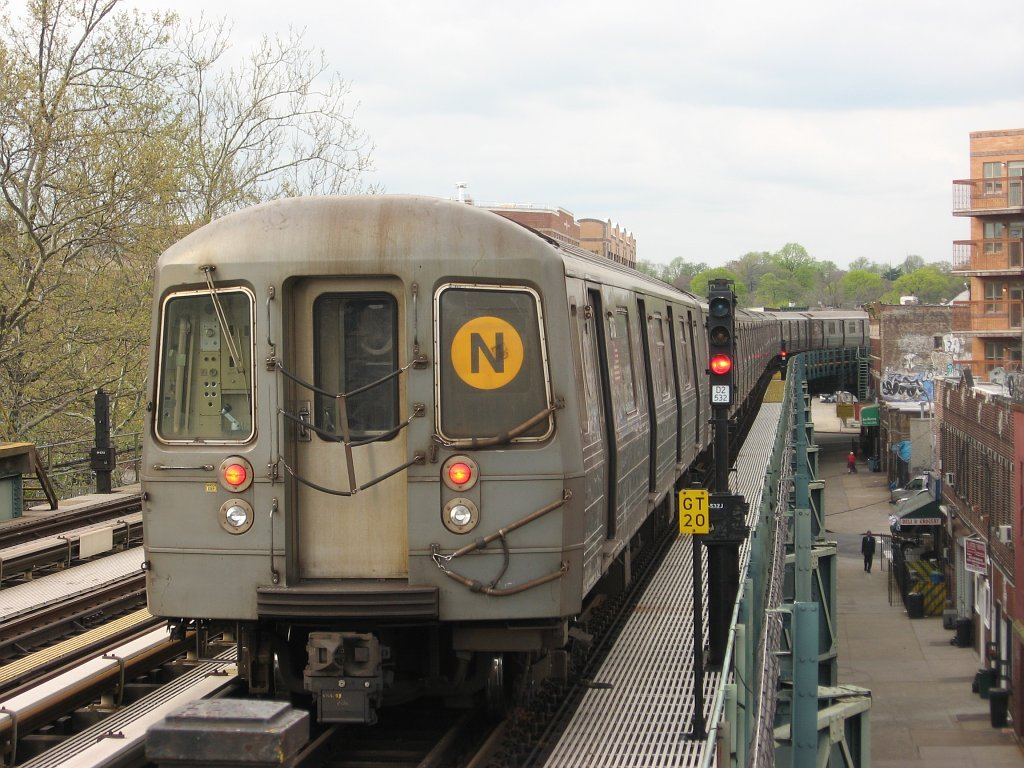
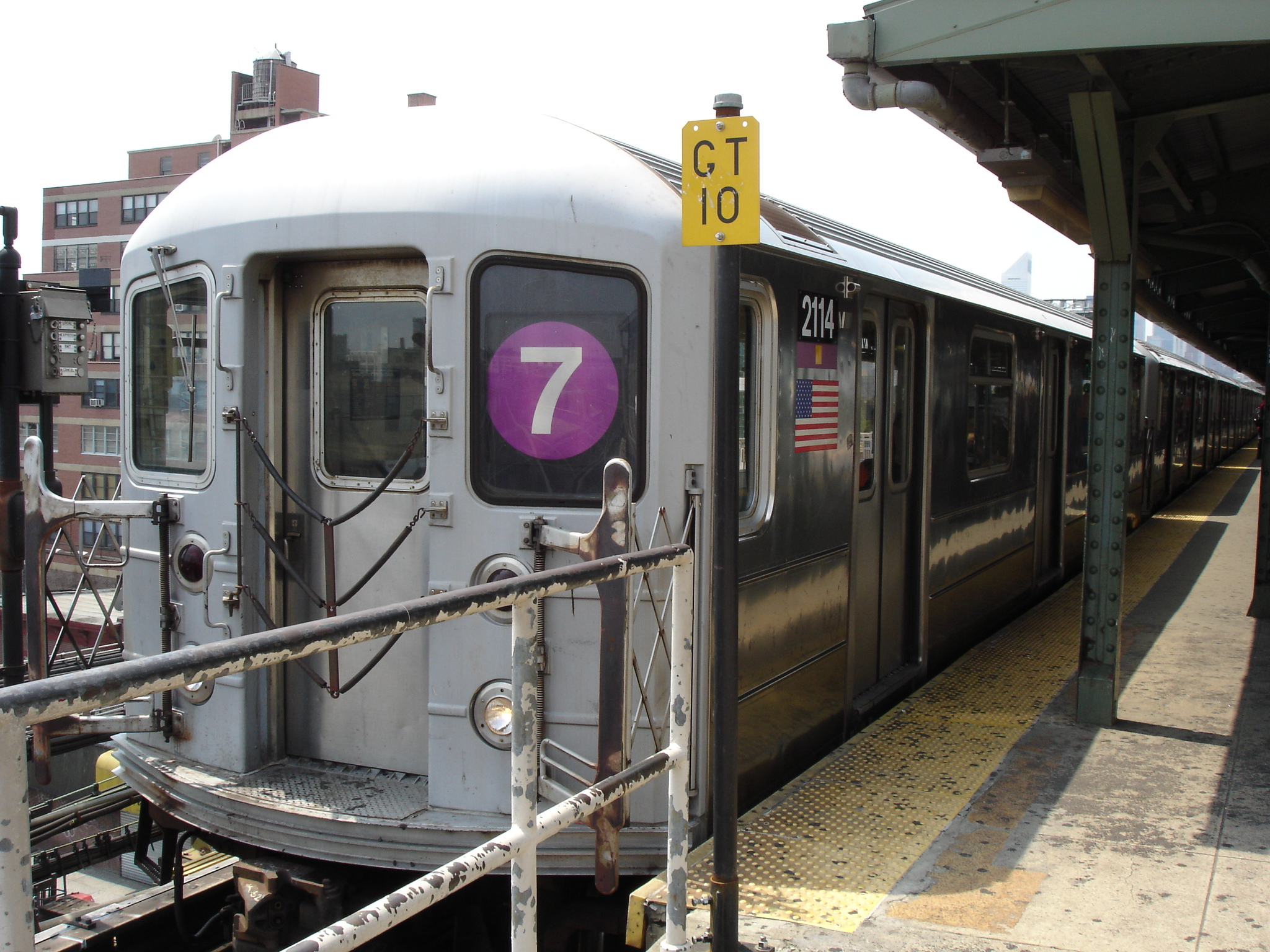
Route bullets for the A, G, N, and 7 services
(clockwise from top left) on rolling stock

The New York City Subway system has 28 lettered or numbered route designations.

- The 1, C, G, L, M, R, and W trains are fully local, making all stops.
- The 2, 3, 4, 5, A, B, D, E, N, and Q trains have portions of express and local service.
- The J train normally operates local, but during rush hours it is joined by the Z train in the peak direction. Both run local, express or skip-stop on different parts of their route.
- The 6 and 7 are fully local, but during rush hours, express variants of the routes, designated by diamond-shaped route markers, are operated alongside the locals in the peak direction.
- The F has portions of express and local service, but during rush hours, an express variant of the route, designated by a diamond-shaped route marker, is operated alongside the local in Brooklyn in the peak direction.
- The letter S is used for three shuttle services: the 42nd Street Shuttle, Franklin Avenue Shuttle, and Rockaway Park Shuttle.

The subway normally operates 24 hours a day with five different service patterns: rush-hour, midday, evening, weekend and late-night. Each service has a table in its article to show what tracks are used and when. This article lists all the current services, along with their lines and terminals and a brief description; see Unused New York City Subway service labels for unused and defunct services.

In the New York City Subway nomenclature, numbered or lettered "services" use different segments of physical trackage, or "lines". The services that run on certain lines change depending on the time of day.

== Time periods ==
The New York City Subway is one of the few subways worldwide operating 7 days a week, 24 hours a day, every day of the year. The schedule is divided into different periods, with each containing different operation patterns and train intervals.

The MTA defines time periods as follows; these are used in articles (sometimes abbreviated by numbers in superscript or the symbol indicated):

- (1) rush hours – 6:30 a.m. to 9:30 a.m. and 3:30 p.m. to 8:00 p.m., Monday–Friday
  - (1a) rush hours in the peak direction (toward Manhattan in the morning, away from Manhattan in the afternoon)
- (2) middays – 9:30 a.m. to 3:30 p.m., Monday–Friday
  - (2a) middays in the peak direction
  - (2b) middays in the non-peak direction
- (3) evenings – 8:00 p.m. to 12:00 a.m., Monday–Friday
  - (3a) early evenings – 8:00 p.m. to 9:30 p.m.
  - (3b) evenings in the peak direction
  - (3c) early evenings in the peak direction – 8:00 p.m. to 9:30 p.m.
- (4) weekends – 6:30 a.m. to 12:00 a.m., Saturday and Sunday (weekends during the day)
- (5) late nights – 12:00 a.m. to 6:30 a.m., every day
  - (5a) weekday late nights
  - (5b) weekend late nights

Other symbols are derivatives and are defined based on the rules above:

- – 24 hours a day, 7 days a week
  - 24 hours a day, except rush hours in the peak direction
  - 24 hours a day, except weekdays in the peak direction
- daily – criteria (1), (2), (3), and (4) above (all times except late nights)
  - daytime hours only, except rush hours in the peak direction
  - daily – criteria (1), (2), (3), (4), and (5b) above (all times except weekday late nights)
- weekdays – criteria (1), (2), and (3) above (weekdays during the day)
- weekdays and weekday nights – criteria (1), (2), (3), and (5a) above
- nights and weekends – criteria (4) and (5) above
  - weekends and weekend nights – criteria (4) and (5b) above
- limited service during rush hours – criterion (1) above, but only for selected trains
  - limited service during rush hours in the peak direction
- service during rush hours in the reverse peak direction – opposite of criteria (1) above
  - limited service during rush hours in the reverse peak direction

== Service listing ==
Lines with colors next to them are the primary trunk line of the corresponding service; they determine the color of the service bullets and diamonds, except shuttles, which are dark gray.

=== Current services ===
	Route	Line(s)	North terminal	South terminal	Service pattern(s)
A Division (IRT)
"1" train	Broadway–Seventh Avenue Local	IRT Broadway–Seventh Avenue Line	Van Cortlandt Park–242nd Street	South Ferry	Operates 24 hours a day. Makes all stops along the full route.
"2" train	Seventh Avenue Express	IRT White Plains Road Line; IRT Lenox Avenue Line; IRT Broadway–Seventh Avenue Line; IRT Eastern Parkway Line; IRT Nostrand Avenue Line	Wakefield–241st Street	Flatbush Avenue–Brooklyn College; New Lots Avenue (some rush hour trips)	Operates 24 hours a day. Makes express stops in Manhattan (between 96th and Chambers Streets) and all stops in the Bronx and Brooklyn during daytime hours; Makes all stops along the full route during overnight hours.
"3" train	Seventh Avenue Express	IRT Lenox Avenue Line; IRT Broadway–Seventh Avenue Line; IRT Eastern Parkway Line; IRT New Lots Line	Harlem–148th Street	New Lots Avenue; 34th Street–Penn Station (late nights)	Operates 24 hours a day. Operates along the full route during daytime hours; makes express stops in Manhattan (between 96th and Chambers Streets) and all stops in Brooklyn. Short turns at 34th Street-Penn Station during overnight hours and does not operate to or from New Lots Avenue.
"4" train	Lexington Avenue Express	IRT Jerome Avenue Line; IRT Lexington Avenue Line; IRT Eastern Parkway Line; IRT New Lots Line	Woodlawn	Crown Heights–Utica Avenue; New Lots Avenue (some rush hour trips and late nights)	Operates 24 hours a day. Makes express stops in Manhattan and Brooklyn and all stops in the Bronx during daytime hours (skips 138th Street during rush hours in the peak direction; Extended beyond Utica Avenue to and from New Lots Avenue and makes all stops during overnight hours (skips Hoyt Street in Brooklyn).
"5" train	Lexington Avenue Express	IRT Dyre Avenue Line; IRT White Plains Road Line; IRT Jerome Avenue Line; IRT Lexington Avenue Line; IRT Eastern Parkway Line; IRT Nostrand Avenue Line	Eastchester–Dyre Avenue; Nereid Avenue (some rush hour trips)	Flatbush Avenue–Brooklyn College (weekdays until 8:45 PM); Bowling Green (weekday evenings and all day weekends); East 180th Street (late nights)	Operates 24 hours a day. Operates along the full route (between Dyre Avenue and Flatbush Avenue) during weekday rush hours, middays and early evenings; Makes express stops in Manhattan and Brooklyn (between Borough Hall and Franklin Avenue and all stops in the Bronx (makes express stops in the Bronx between East 180th Street and Third Avenue–149th Street during rush hours in the peak direction; Additional service operates to and from Nereid Avenue during rush hours in the peak direction instead of Dyre Avenue. Short turns at Bowling Green during weekday evenings and all day on weekends and does not operate to or from Flatbush Avenue; Operates as a shuttle between Dyre Avenue and East 180th Street during overnight hours.
"6" train	Lexington Avenue Local	IRT Pelham Line; IRT Lexington Avenue Line	Pelham Bay Park; Parkchester (weekday rush hours, middays and evenings)	Brooklyn Bridge–City Hall	Operates 24 hours a day. Makes all stops along the full route; When the <6> is operating, 6 Local trains short turn at Parkchester in the Bronx during weekday rush hours, middays and evenings; peak direction service does not operate to or from Pelham Bay Park.
"6" express train	Pelham Bay Park Express	IRT Pelham Line; IRT Lexington Avenue Line	Pelham Bay Park	Brooklyn Bridge–City Hall	Operates weekday rush hours and middays in the peak direction only. Operates along the full route and makes express stops in the Bronx (between Parkchester and Third Avenue–138th Street and all stops in the Bronx.
"7" train	Flushing Local	IRT Flushing Line	Flushing–Main Street	34th Street–Hudson Yards	Operates 24 hours a day. Makes all stops along the full route.
"7" express train	Flushing Express	IRT Flushing Line	Flushing–Main Street	34th Street–Hudson Yards	Operates weekday rush hours and early evenings in the peak direction only. Makes express stops in Queens between Main Street and 74th Street–Broadway and all stops in Manhattan.
42nd Street Shuttle	42nd Street Shuttle	IRT 42nd Street Shuttle	Times Square	Grand Central	Operates at all times except overnights.
B Division (IND/BMT)
"A" train	Eighth Avenue Express	IND Eighth Avenue Line; IND Fulton Street Line; IND Rockaway Line	Inwood–207th Street; Euclid Avenue (late night Lefferts Boulevard Shuttle)	Far Rockaway–Mott Avenue or Ozone Park–Lefferts Boulevard; Rockaway Park–Beach 116th Street (some peak direction rush hour trips)	Operates at all times, normally express between 168th Street and Euclid Avenue and local elsewhere. Trains alternate between Lefferts Boulevard and Far Rockaway with limited peak service to Rockaway Park. Operates fully local late nights only to Far Rockaway with shuttle service between Euclid Avenue and Lefferts Boulevard.
"B" train	Sixth Avenue Express	IND Concourse Line; IND Eighth Avenue Line; IND Sixth Avenue Line; BMT Brighton Line	Bedford Park Boulevard (rush hours and limited middays); 145th Street (limited middays and evenings)	Brighton Beach	Operates weekdays only, until 10:00 PM. Operates express in Brooklyn and on the IND Sixth Avenue Line in Manhattan; local on Central Park West/Eighth Avenue Line in Manhattan and in the Bronx. Short turns at 145th Street during limited middays and evenings.
"C" train	Eighth Avenue Local	IND Eighth Avenue Line; IND Fulton Street Line	168th Street	Euclid Avenue	Operates at all times except late nights, fully local.
"D" train	Sixth Avenue Express	IND Concourse Line; IND Eighth Avenue Line; IND Sixth Avenue Line; BMT Fourth Avenue Line; BMT West End Line	Norwood–205th Street	Coney Island–Stillwell Avenue	Operates at all times, express in Manhattan at all times, normally express on the BMT Fourth Avenue Line in Brooklyn and local elsewhere in Brooklyn. Operates fully local in Brooklyn late nights. Express on the IND Concourse Line rush hours in the peak direction and local other times.
"E" train	Eighth Avenue Local	IND Archer Avenue Line; IND Queens Boulevard Line; IND Eighth Avenue Line	Jamaica Center–Parsons/Archer; Jamaica–179th Street (some rush hour trips)	World Trade Center	Operates at all times, normally express on the IND Queens Boulevard Line in Queens and local elsewhere. Operates local north of Forest Hills weekday evenings and weekends. Operates fully local late nights.
"F" train	Queens Boulevard Express/Sixth Avenue Local	IND Queens Boulevard Line; IND 63rd Street Line (nights/weekends); IND Sixth Avenue Line; IND Culver Line	Jamaica–179th Street	Coney Island–Stillwell Avenue; Kings Highway (some rush hour trips)	Operates at all times. Operates express in Queens between Forest Hills–71st Avenue and Fifth Avenue/53rd Street via 53rd Street during weekdays. Operates local in Queens and via the 63rd Street Line nights and weekends. Some rush hour trains short turn at Kings Highway. Operates local in Manhattan and Brooklyn.
"F" express train	Culver Express	IND Queens Boulevard Line; IND Sixth Avenue Line; IND Culver Line	Jamaica–179th Street	Coney Island–Stillwell Avenue	Operates rush hours, peak direction only. Operates express in Queens between Forest Hills–71st Avenue and Fifth Avenue/53rd Street and in Brooklyn between Jay Street–MetroTech and Church Avenue, and local elsewhere.
"G" train	Brooklyn–Queens Crosstown	IND Crosstown Line; IND Culver Line	Court Square	Church Avenue	Operates at all times, fully local.
"J" train	Nassau Street Local	BMT Archer Avenue Line; BMT Jamaica Line; BMT Nassau Street Line	Jamaica Center–Parsons/Archer	Broad Street	Operates at all times, normally fully local. Operates skip-stop with the Z train during rush hours in the peak direction. Runs express from Myrtle Avenue to Marcy Avenue rush hours and middays in the peak direction.
"L" train	14th Street–Canarsie Local	BMT Canarsie Line	Eighth Avenue	Canarsie–Rockaway Parkway	Operates at all times, fully local. Some Canarsie-bound trains short-turn at Myrtle-Wyckoff Avenues during the AM rush hour.
"M" train	Queens Boulevard/Sixth Avenue Local	IND Queens Boulevard Line; IND Sixth Avenue Line; BMT Nassau Street Line; BMT Jamaica Line; BMT Myrtle Avenue Line	Forest Hills–71st Avenue; Essex Street (weekdays evenings and all day weekends); Myrtle Avenue (late nights)	Middle Village–Metropolitan Avenue	Operates with local service at all times. Operates the full route weekdays. Short turns at Essex Street weekday evenings and all day weekends. Operates as a shuttle (Metropolitan Avenue to Myrtle Avenue) late nights.
"N" train	Broadway Express	BMT Astoria Line; BMT Broadway Line; BMT Fourth Avenue Line; BMT Sea Beach Line	Astoria–Ditmars Boulevard	Coney Island–Stillwell Avenue	Operates at all times. Normally operates via the Manhattan Bridge, express on the BMT Broadway Line south of Times Square weekdays, express on the BMT Fourth Avenue Line in Brooklyn, and local elsewhere. Local in Manhattan weekends Operates via the Montague Street Tunnel late nights, fully local.
"Q" train	Second Avenue/Broadway Express/Brighton Local	IND Second Avenue Line; BMT 63rd Street Line; BMT Broadway Line; BMT Brighton Line	96th Street	Coney Island–Stillwell Avenue	Operates at all times, normally express in Manhattan and local in Brooklyn. Operates fully local late nights.
"R" train	Broadway Local	IND Queens Boulevard Line; BMT Broadway Line; BMT Fourth Avenue Line	Forest Hills–71st Avenue; Whitehall Street–South Ferry (late nights)	Bay Ridge–95th Street	Operates the full route at all times except late nights, fully local. Short turns at Whitehall Street late nights.
Franklin Avenue Shuttle	Franklin Avenue Shuttle	BMT Franklin Avenue Line	Franklin Avenue	Prospect Park	Operates at all times.
Rockaway Park Shuttle	Rockaway Park Shuttle	IND Rockaway Line; IND Rockaway Park Branch	Broad Channel	Rockaway Park–Beach 116th Street	Operates at all times.
"W" train	Broadway Local	BMT Astoria Line; BMT Broadway Line	Astoria–Ditmars Boulevard	Whitehall Street–South Ferry	Operates during weekdays only until 10:00 PM, fully local, making all stops.
"Z" train	Nassau Street Express	BMT Archer Avenue Line; BMT Jamaica Line; BMT Nassau Street Line	Jamaica Center–Parsons/Archer	Broad Street	Skip-stop pair with J service during rush hours in the peak direction only.

=== Future services ===
	Route	Line(s)	North terminal	South terminal	Service pattern(s)
"T" train	Second Avenue Local	IND Second Avenue Line	Broadway	Houston Street (Phase 3); Hanover Square (Phase 4)	Will operate at all times, fully local, making all stops

=== Service variants ===
- The 6 service has a midday (2a) and rush hour (1a) diamond Bronx express service labeled <6>, in addition to 6 local service.
- The 7 service has a rush hour (1a), and evening (3c) diamond Queens express service labeled <7>, in addition to 7 local service.
- Overnights (5), the A train between 104th Street and Ozone Park–Lefferts Boulevard is replaced by a shuttle which originates at Euclid Avenue. This service has been labeled on the late-night map as (gray A) and on trains as (blue S).
- The F service has a rush hour (1a), diamond Brooklyn express service labeled <F>, in addition to F local service.

Several services operate shorter routes during lower ridership hours, but these are neither signed differently nor counted as separate services. Although service changes caused by General Orders for construction occur on most days during midday and overnight hours, and throughout most weekends, these changes are not counted as separate services.

==== Variants to a different terminal ====
Because of some terminal station capacity constraints, numerous services operate to a secondary terminal as well as their usual terminus during peak hours.

- Limited rush hour 2 trains operate to and from a different southern terminal (New Lots Avenue).
- Limited rush hour 4 trains are extended to and from New Lots Avenue.
- Limited rush hour 5 trains operate to and from two different northern terminals (Nereid Avenue and Gun Hill Road) and two different southern terminals (New Lots Avenue and Utica Avenue).
- Limited rush hour E trains operate to and from a different northern terminal (Jamaica–179th Street).
- Limited rush hour N trains operate from a different northern terminal (96th Street).
- One rush hour R train operates to a different northern terminal (96th Street).
- Limited rush hour W trains are extended to and from 86th Street.

==== Short turns ====
Because of some terminal station capacity constraints, numerous services operate a truncated route through a short turn as well as their usual terminus during weekdays. This list does not include overnight schedule truncations.

- Limited weekday 1 trains operate to and from a different northern terminal (238th Street, 215th Street and 137th Street–City College).
- Limited rush hour 2 trains operate from a different northern terminal (Nereid Avenue)
- Limited weekday 3 trains operate from a different northern terminal (145th Street).
- Limited weekday 4 trains operate to and from a different northern terminal (149th Street–Grand Concourse, Bedford Park Boulevard–Lehman College and Kingsbridge Road) and a different southern terminal (Bowling Green and New Lots Avenue).
- Limited weekday 5 trains operate to and from a different northern terminal (East 180th Street) and a different southern terminal (Bowling Green).
- Limited rush hour 6 trains operate to and from a different northern terminal (Parkchester and Third Avenue–138th Street)
- Limited rush hour 7 trains operate to and from a different eastern terminal (Mets–Willets Point and 111th Street)
- Limited weekday A trains operate to and from a different northern terminal (Dyckman Street, 168th Street and Euclid Avenue) and a different southern terminal (Euclid Avenue).
- Limited weekday B trains operate to and from a different northern terminal (Kingsbridge Road and 145th Street)
- Limited rush hour D trains operate from a different northern terminal (Bedford Park Boulevard), to a different southern terminal (Bay Parkway), and from a different southern terminal (25th Avenue)
- Limited weekday F trains operate to and from a different southern terminal (Church Avenue, Avenue X, and Kings Highway)
- Limited weekday J trains operate from a different eastern terminal (Broadway Junction) and to and from a different western terminal (Broadway Junction)
- Limited weekday and weekend L trains operate to and from a different eastern terminal (Myrtle–Wyckoff Avenues and East 105th Street)
- Limited weekday N trains operate from a different southern terminal (86th Street)
- Limited evening Q trains operate to a different southern terminal (Brighton Beach)
- Limited evening R trains operate to a different northern terminal (Queens Plaza)

==== Event variants ====
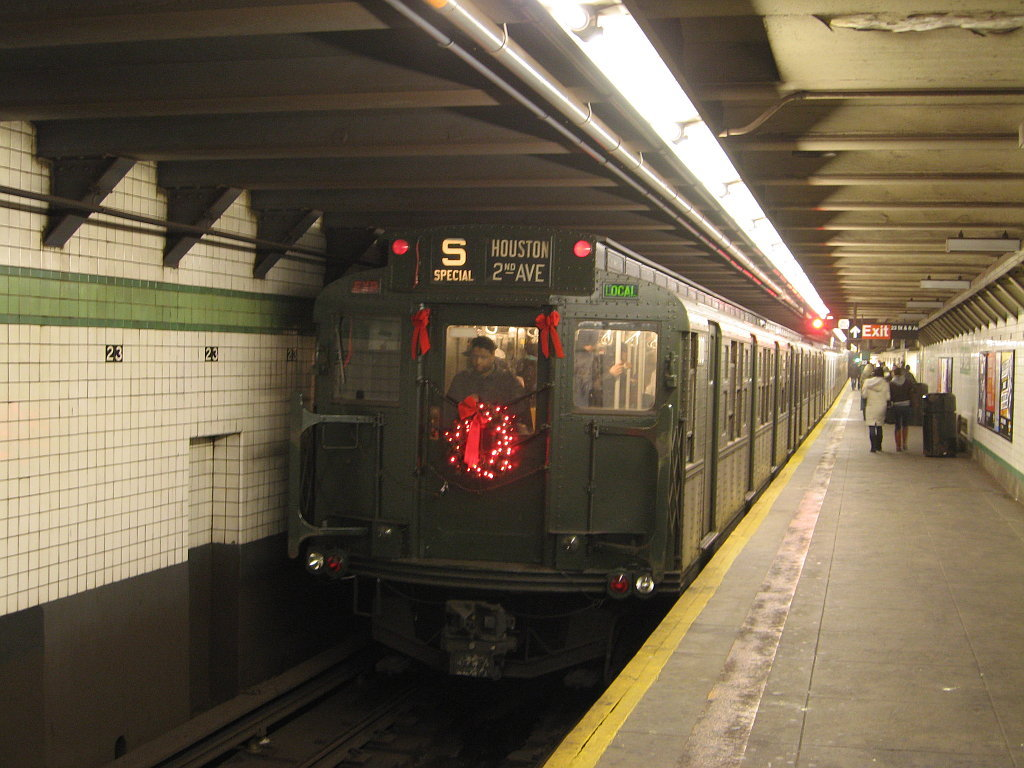
The "2007 Holiday Shopper's Special", which ran on December Sundays, is a train of museum subway cars. This particular car is displaying the (former) S Special on its rollsign at the 23rd Street (Sixth Avenue) station.

The following lines run in special service or after sporting and other events:

- The 4 train has a downtown-only express from 161st Street–Yankee Stadium to Bowling Green after events at Yankee Stadium.
- The 7 train has a Manhattan-bound "Super Express" from Mets–Willets Point, operating express, and also bypassing Junction Boulevard, Hunters Point Avenue and Vernon Boulevard–Jackson Avenue after New York Mets games weeknights and weekends at Citi Field, as well as after US Open tennis matches.
- The Holiday Nostalgia Train, which is made up of retired subway cars, runs on weekends during the Christmas holiday season. The pre-2022 version of the train, marked as S | Special, ran via IND trackage to Second Avenue, with northern terminals at either Queens Plaza or 145th Street and ran on Sunday mornings and mid-days from Thanksgiving until the Sunday before Christmas. For the 2022 holiday season, the train, signed as the 1 train, traveled via IRT trackage between 137th Street and Chambers Street. During Saturdays in December 2023, the IND version was back in the daytime, with 145th Street being the northern terminal.

== Train frequency charts ==
=== Train intervals ===
The schedule offers trains every 3 to 5 minutes on the most used sections during rush hours. During other traffic periods, intervals range usually from 4 to 12 minutes or up to 20 minutes on outer sections. During late nights, only selected express services are operated and all late-night services usually run every 20 minutes.

Train times
Day of the week	Rush Hour a.m.	Midday	Rush Hour p.m.	Evening	Weekend	Late Night
Monday to Friday	6:30 a.m. – 9:30 a.m.	9:30 a.m. – 3:30 p.m.	3:30 p.m. – 8 p.m.	8 p.m. – 12 a.m.	—N/a	12 a.m. – 6:30 a.m.
Saturday, Sunday, Holidays	—N/a	—N/a	—N/a	—N/a	6:30 a.m. – 12 a.m.	12 a.m. – 6:30 a.m.

Train headways in minutes
Period	"1" train	"2" train	"3" train	"4" train	"5" train	"6" train "6" express train	"7" train "7" express train	(42nd St.)	"A" train	"B" train	"C" train	"D" train	"E" train	"F" train "F" express train	"G" train	"J" train "Z" train	"L" train	"M" train	"N" train	"Q" train	"R" train	"W" train	(Fkln. Ave.)	(Rock. Park)
Rush hours	3-7	6-7	6-7	4-5	4-6	3-7	2-3	2-4	6	7-9	9-10	6-7	4-5	4-5	6-9	5-8	3-4	8-10	6-8	5-7	6-8	8-10	10	12-28
Middays	6	7-8	8-9	7-8	8-9	5-6	5	5	8	8	8	8	7-8	7-8	8	8	4-6	8	8	8	8	10	10	13-17
Evenings	10	8-12	12	10	10-12	10-12	5-8	5	7	10	12	10-12	6-10	8-10	8-12	12-15	7-12	12-15	10-12	8-12	12	10	12-15	15-20
Weekends	6-8	8-12	8-12	8-12	8-12	6-8	4-8	5	10	—N/a	12	12	12	12	8	8-10	4-10	8-10	12	8-10	12	—N/a	10-15	15-20
Late nights	20	20	20	20	20	20	20	—N/a	20	—N/a	—N/a	20	20	20	20	20	20	20	20	20	20	—N/a	20	20
The 3 train runs late nights Harlem–148th Street ↔ 34th Street-Penn Station only. Between Crown Heights–Utica Avenue and New Lots Avenue, 4 train operates during this time.; The 5 train runs late nights Eastchester-Dyre Avenue ↔ East 180th Street only. During weekday rush hours, 5 train runs express between East 180th Street and Third Avenue–149th Street in the peak direction; this is the reason for the different intervals shown in the table.; Every other 6 train runs express between Third Avenue–138th Street and Parkchester weekdays from 06:30 until 12:30 only in inbound direction and from 12:30 until 21:00 only in outbound direction. Local trains terminate at Parkchester while express trains continue as locals to Pelham Bay Park during weekday p.m. rush hours.; Every other 7 train runs express weekdays from 06:30 until 10:00 only in inbound direction and from 14:30 until 22:00 only in outbound direction.; The A train, except overnights, serves both the Ozone Park–Lefferts Boulevard and Howard Beach - JFK Airport termini approximately alternating; during rush hours, very limited service terminates at Euclid Avenue. Overnights, just the Howard Beach terminus serves the entire route, with Ozone Park-Lefferts Boulevard being served by an A shuttle operating from Euclid Avenue.; Two F trains in the weekday a.m. rush hour, and two in the p.m. rush hour, operate peak-direction express in Brooklyn between Jay Street and Church Avenue.; Every other J train is designated as a Z train during weekdays rush hours for one hour in the peak direction; both J & Z operate skip-stop between Sutphin Boulevard and Myrtle Avenue during these times.; The M train operates as a shuttle between Middle Village–Metropolitan Avenue and Myrtle Avenue from 23:00 until 06:30, and on weekends and evenings between Middle Village–Metropolitan Avenue and Essex Street; The R train operates between Whitehall Street and 95th Street during late nights.

=== Trains per hour ===
This is a list of average train frequencies during different times of the day, measured in trains per hour (tph). This chart shows frequencies based on the train intervals listed in timetables, with a margin of error of 2 tph.

Trains per hour
Period	"1" train	"2" train	"3" train	"4" train	"5" train	"6" train	"6" express train	"7" train	"7" express train	(42nd St.)	"A" train	"B" train	"C" train	"D" train	"E" train	"F" train	"F" express train	"G" train	"J" train	"Z" train	"L" train	"M" train	"N" train	"Q" train	"R" train	"W" train	(Fkln. Ave.)	(Rock. Pk.)
Rush hours	8–18	9–10 (Note: Some trains also go to New Lots Avenue during rush hours)	9–10	14.5	14.5 (Note: Most trains go to Dyre Avenue, but a few go to Nereid Avenue)	8	8–12	10–15	10–15	20	12 (Note: 5 for Lefferts Boulevard, 6 for Howard Beach, and 1 from/to Euclid Av)	8	6–7	10	15 (Note: 12 to Parsons/Archer, 3 to 179th Street)	14.5	2 (Note: 2 from Brooklyn in the AM, and 2 toward Brooklyn in the PM)	6–8	6	6	18–20	7–8	7.5	7.5-10	7.5	6-7	6	3-4
Middays, evenings, and weekends (Note: Evening and weekend frequencies are the same as midday frequencies, with the following exceptions: <6> trains do not operate in the evenings or weekends. B and W trains do not operate on weekends.)	10	7.5	7.5	7.5	7.5	7.5	7.5	12	—N/a	12	8 (Note: Trains alternate between Howard Beach and Lefferts Boulevard)	6-7.5	6-7.5	6-7.5	8	8	—N/a	7.5	6-7.5	—N/a	15	6-7.5	6	6	6	6	6	4
Late nights	3	3	3	3	3	3	—N/a	3	—N/a	—N/a	6 (Note: 3 for Howard Beach, 3 for Lefferts Boulevard shuttle)	—N/a	—N/a	3	3	3	—N/a	3	3	—N/a	3	3	3	3	3	—N/a	3	3

== History ==
See New York City Subway nomenclature for a complete explanation; this is just a table of when each service has existed (and been signed for the public). Shuttles were SS until 1985, when they became S (which had been used for specials). See here for the colors used for shuttles in 1967; in 1968 all six became green, and in 1979 all shuttles became dark gray.

== See also ==
- List of New York City Subway lines
- New York City Subway nomenclature
- Unused New York City Subway service labels
- Staten Island Railway
