= New York City Subway nomenclature =

Terminology of the New York City Subway

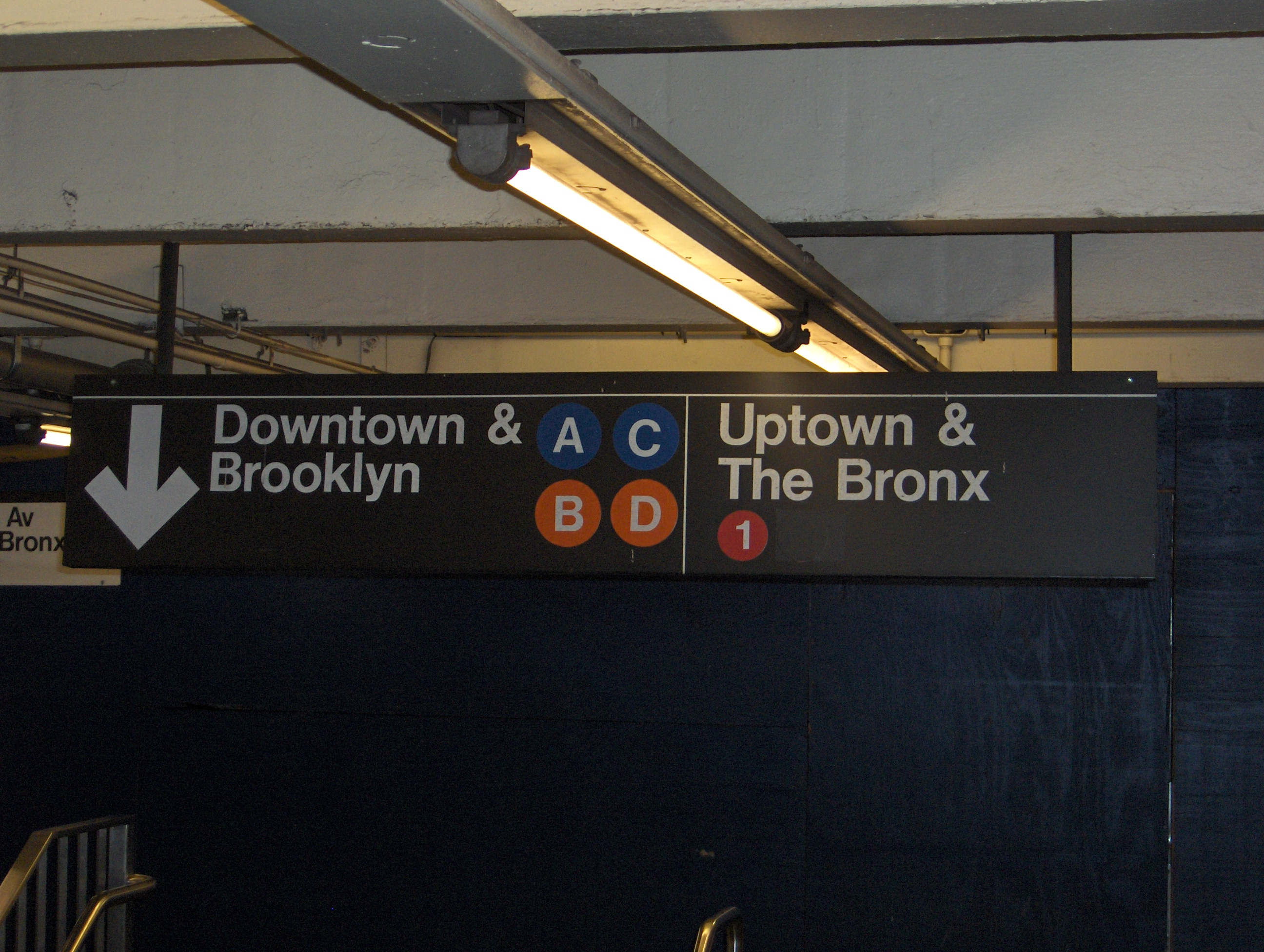
Signs for southbound ("Downtown & Brooklyn") and northbound ("Uptown & The Bronx") platforms at the 59th Street – Columbus Circle station

New York City Subway nomenclature is the terminology used in the New York City Subway system. The modern system was constructed and operated by multiple companies, which were unified into a single system in 1940. The process of integrating multiple systems, as well as over a century of service changes, have led to a complexity of conventions around station naming, directionality and the routes themselves. In particular, the New York City Subway distinguishes between lines, or individual sections of subway, and services, or train routes. Services are represented visually by grouped, color coded service bullets, which have changed significantly over time.

== Current usage ==
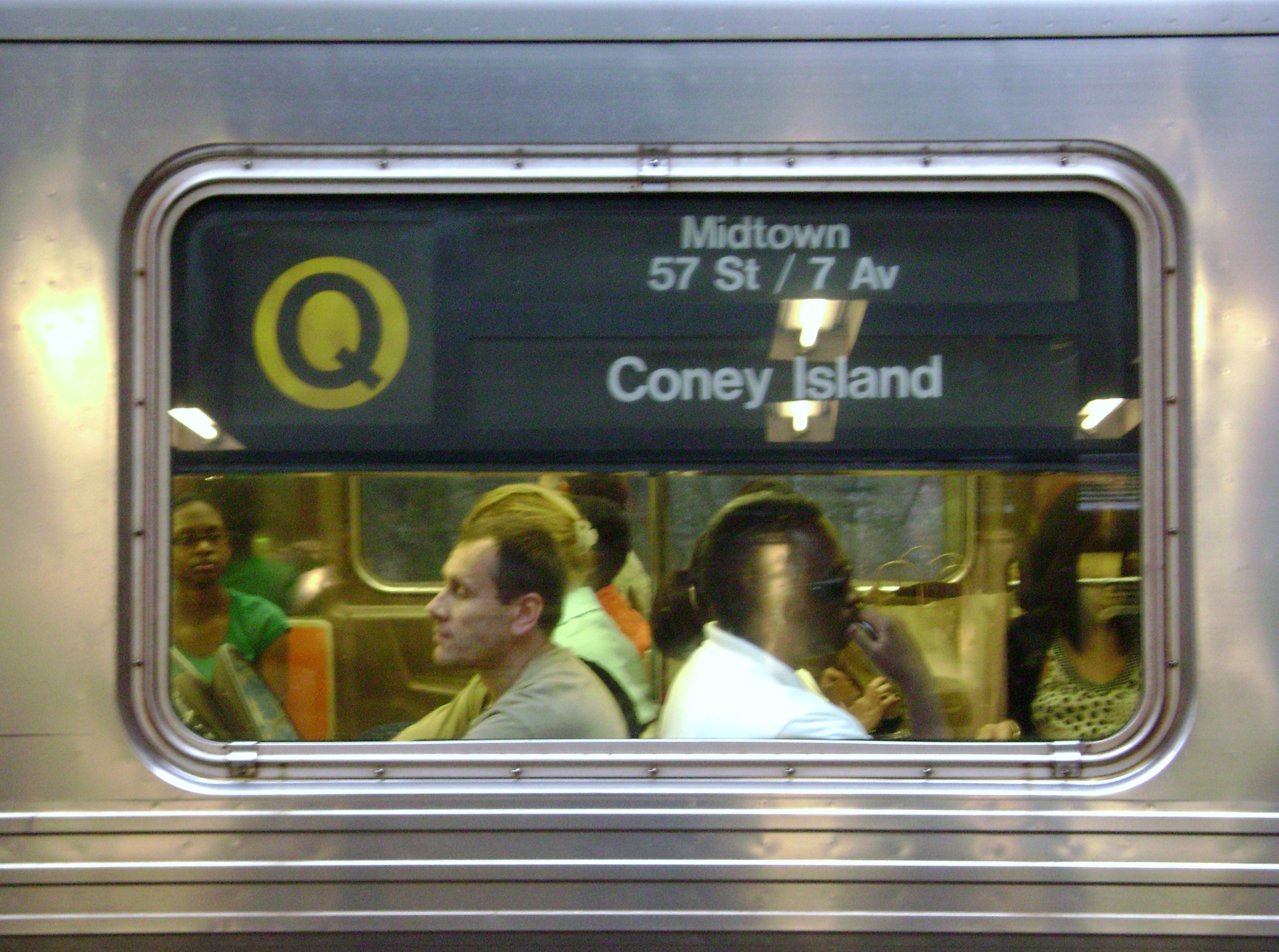
A rollsign reading on an R68A car. The sign reads: Midtown; 57 St/7 Av Coney Island

Each section of the subway has three identifying characteristics, line, service and color.

=== Subway lines ===
Sections of the physical infrastructure of the subway system are called lines and are identified by their name and frequently their original operating company or division: Brooklyn–Manhattan Transit Corporation (BMT), Interborough Rapid Transit Company (IRT), Independent Subway System (IND). For example, the line under Eighth Avenue is called the IND Eighth Avenue Line. With few exceptions, these names have remained relatively constant throughout the history of the subway.

Public usage of the line names varies widely, although the MTA's public usage of trunk names has increased since 2012, especially on Fastrack signs. Internally, the MTA also uses the names, both for legal reasons and to describe lines, services and locations without ambiguity. Although the three major subway systems are now unified, the terms BMT, IRT and IND are still used in line, structure and building descriptions and capital contract specifications. However, the names of the former companies are no longer used by much of the general public.

=== Service designations ===
Each operating service or route is assigned a letter or number. This is a path that the train service uses along the various lines. These are the most familiar names among the public, but may change due to construction or reroutes. Former IRT services (now known as A Division) are assigned numbers, and former BMT and IND services (now known as B Division) are assigned letters.

Prior to consolidation under city ownership in 1940, the BMT routes were also assigned numbers. As track connections were built between IND and BMT lines to create a unified division, the BMT routes were gradually assigned letters for consistency with the IND naming scheme. IRT trains and tunnels are narrower, however, so the two divisions do not mix in revenue service.

=== Colors and service bullets ===
Each service is also assigned a color. Since 1979, each service's color corresponds to the line that service primarily uses below 60th Street in Manhattan. In the case of the IND Crosstown Line (which never enters Manhattan), the color is light green. This is defined as the trunk line. All shuttle services are dark gray. The list of trunk lines and colors is shown in the following table.

Diagram showing all the NYC Subway Lines, instead of services and routes.

Primary Trunk line	Color	Pantone	Hexadecimal	Service bullets
IND Eighth Avenue Line	Blue	PMS 286	#0039a6	"A" train "C" train "E" train
IND Sixth Avenue Line	Orange	PMS 165	#ff6319	"B" train "D" train "F" train "F" express train "M" train
IND Crosstown Line	Lime	PMS 376	#6cbe45	"G" train
BMT Canarsie Line	Light slate gray	50% black	#a7a9ac	"L" train
BMT Nassau Street Line	Brown	PMS 154	#996633	"J" train "Z" train
BMT Broadway Line	Yellow	PMS 116	#fccc0a	"N" train "Q" train "R" train "W" train
IRT Broadway–Seventh Avenue Line	Red	PMS 185	#ee352e	"1" train "2" train "3" train
IRT Lexington Avenue Line	Green	PMS 355	#00933c	"4" train "5" train "6" train "6" express train
IRT Flushing Line	Purple	PMS Purple	#b933ad	"7" train "7" express train
IND Second Avenue Line	Turquoise	PMS 638	#00add0	"T" train
Shuttles	Dark slate gray	70% black	#808183	shuttle train

==== Diamond services ====
Normal and diamond 7 bullets

Despite its efforts toward single identifiers for each service, the MTA uses diamond bullets to distinguish rush-hour express service from regular service, which is represented with circular bullets. Since a route letter or number is ordinarily presented inside a circle, variants of the same service are shown as the same letter or number inside a diamond shape.

===== In use =====
- 6 regular service operates local at all times; weekday peak-direction <6> diamond service runs express in the Bronx (with local service in the same direction cut back to Parkchester).
- 7 regular service operates local at all times; weekday rush-hour peak-direction <7> diamond service runs express in Queens.
- F regular service operates at all times; weekday rush-hour peak-direction <F> diamond service runs express in Brooklyn.

===== Former use =====
Until May 2005, rush hour 5 service to Nereid Avenue–238th Street in the Bronx was marked with a diamond with regular "circle" service to Eastchester–Dyre Avenue. Both services were express services in the Bronx between East 180th Street and Third Avenue–149th Street during rush hours in peak direction.

Diamond service operated on the BMT Brighton Line while the north side of the Manhattan Bridge was closed for repairs from 2001 to 2004. Full-time local service was designated with a circle Q while weekday-only express service was designated with a diamond <Q>. Other services have also used the diamond before and during the closure from 1986 to 2004; at least one (a brown <R>) dated from a BMT special service using the same number (BMT 2) as the main service that became the R from 1986 to 1988.

In addition to the <5>, <6>, and <7>, official maps and schedules used to show several other rush-hour only services with a diamond, including the <4> bypassing 138th Street, <A> to Rockaway Park, <B> and <C> to Bedford Park Boulevard, <D> express on the IND Concourse Line, and the <M> to Bay Parkway. In May 2004, the map was changed to show only the diamond <6> and <7>. The diamond symbol usage has thus been redefined to indicate a variant rush-hour express service running simultaneously with a local service in the same direction.

==== Special services ====
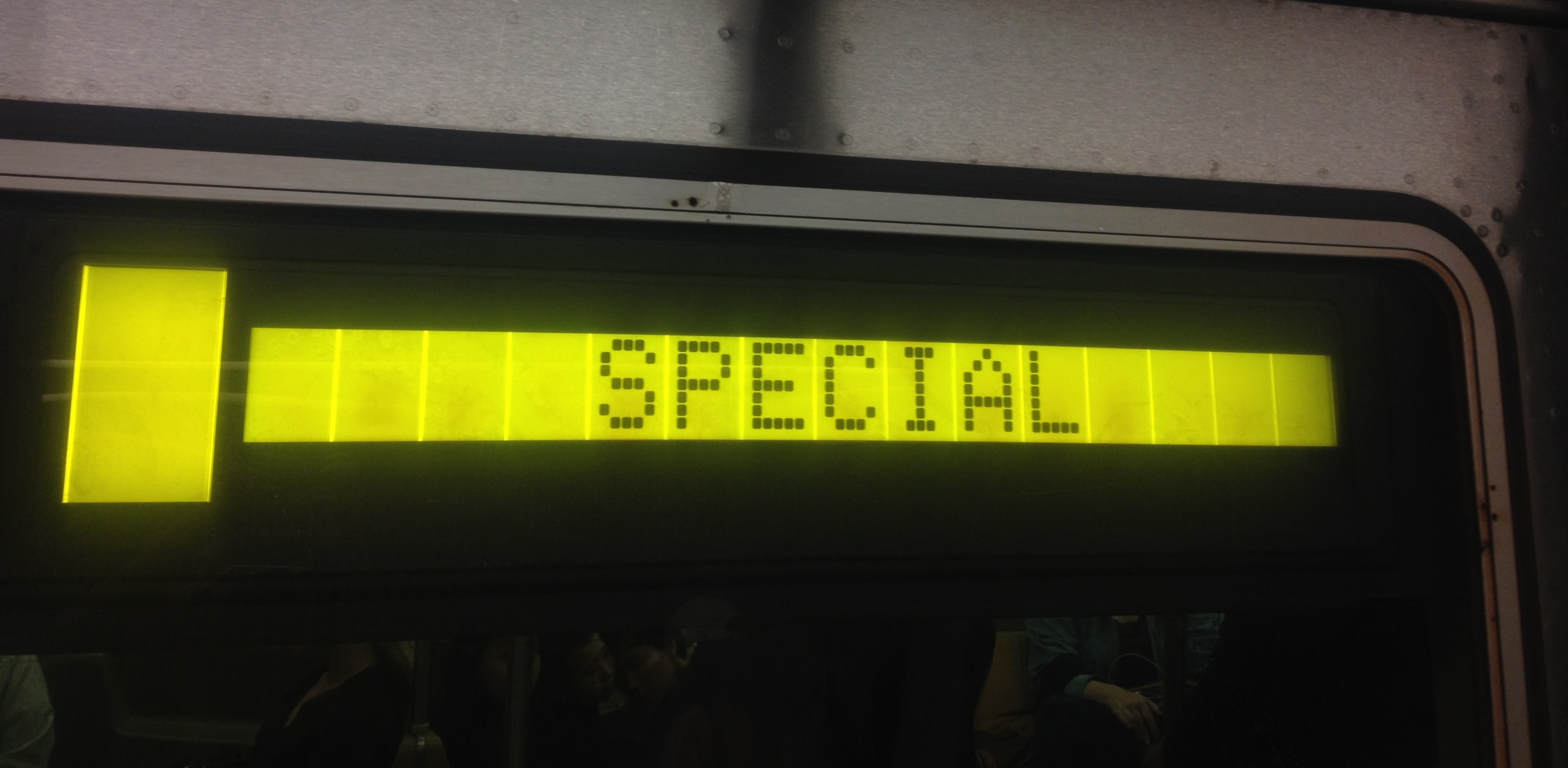
An R46 LCD sign on the IND Sixth Avenue Line

Special is a signifier for a train that is running along a nonstandard route. It is sometimes used for special holiday trains, baseball game service, or for emergency or custom routes. Most trains have a "Special" option on the rollsigns or LCD/LED displays.

=== Station names ===
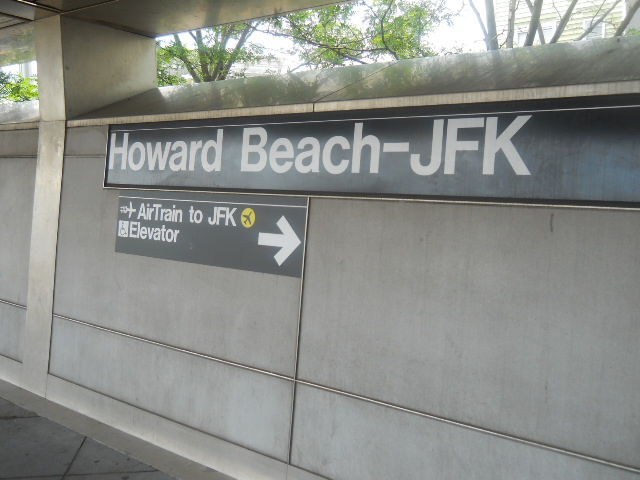
The name of the Howard Beach–JFK Airport station in Queens bears the neighborhood's name of Howard Beach, as well as advertises its connection to John F. Kennedy International Airport via the "AirTrain to JFK."

Stations usually bear the street names of streets the line crosses, but may also be named after neighborhoods or prominent locations (e.g., "Brighton Beach" for Brighton Beach; "Cypress Hills" for Cypress Hills, Brooklyn) or combinations of these (e.g., "Times Square–42nd Street" for Times Square and 42nd Street; "Astoria–Ditmars Boulevard" for Astoria and Ditmars Boulevard), especially at line terminals. Others are named after major destinations, either along with the street names (e.g., "68th Street–Hunter College" for Hunter College, "81st Street–Museum of Natural History" for American Museum of Natural History) or in some cases without (e.g., "Pelham Bay Park" for Pelham Bay Park, "Borough Hall" for Brooklyn Borough Hall). When a station is served by trains of multiple trunk lines, the names used on each line may be hyphenated to form a station name that refers to an intersection (e.g., Fourth Avenue–Ninth Street; Myrtle–Wyckoff Avenues). Of the system's 472 stations, more than 300 are named after streets or street intersections alone, while the remainder are identified by different combinations of streets, neighborhoods and landmarks.

Many stations share names, so to uniquely identify a station, the line name or cross street must be specified: for example, there are three stations named Kings Highway in Brooklyn. Usually, identifying the service is also sufficient (e.g., "Kings Highway on the B and Q" to denote the station at East 16th Street), but as services are transient, this is not a permanent label.

The MTA has looked at certain station names as a source of revenue. In June 2009, the Atlantic Avenue/Pacific Street station in Brooklyn was renamed Atlantic Avenue–Barclays Center following a deal with Forest City Ratner who pay $200,000 per year for the rights to the name. On the other hand, Willets Point–Shea Stadium was renamed Mets–Willets Point because the MTA could not reach a deal with the Mets organization. Had the naming rights deal been achieved, the station would have been known as Willets Point–Citi Field.

=== Describing directions ===
==== Public information ====
On the BMT system, most in-station signage specified to city and from city. Currently, signs typically read to Manhattan, if the train is heading toward Manhattan, and to destination (e.g. to Coney Island or to Canarsie), if the train is heading toward an outer-borough destination. If the train is headed to a different borough, it may also be described as borough-bound (e.g. Manhattan-bound or Brooklyn-bound). If its terminus is in the same borough, it will be described as terminus-bound, for example, Eighth Avenue-bound or Rockaway Parkway-bound. In Manhattan or the Bronx, directions may be described as uptown and downtown, roughly corresponding to compass north and south. If the final destination is more than one borough away, signs will generally display the name of the next one or two boroughs that the route will pass through. Trains would display to Uptown and Borough if the train is heading uptown and into another borough, or to Downtown and Borough if the train is heading downtown and into another borough.

==== Internal usage ====
In the United States, most railroads have only two rail directions. In this vein, all New York City subway lines are deemed to run north–south. In many cases, this is close to the related compass direction, but this is not always possible. Any line that enters Manhattan from the Bronx or Queens heads south into Manhattan; any line entering Manhattan from Brooklyn goes north into Manhattan, with the BMT Nassau Street Line and BMT Canarsie Lines being the only exception, as the Nassau Street Line heads further south into Manhattan's Financial District after entering Manhattan over the Williamsburg Bridge, and the Canarsie Line goes neither north nor south. Directions of other lines are determined by following the services that run over them; except for the BMT Eastern Division services (over the Williamsburg Bridge), which change direction at Chambers Street, every service has one north end and one south end. On the 42nd Street Shuttle, railroad north is compass west, due to the line's former status as part of the main line.

== History ==
This nomenclature has been complicated by the differing systems and cultures of the former private companies that operated parts of the system, by the need for non-ambiguous names in a city where there are stations with the same name on different lines in different locations and even different boroughs, and by changing perceptions of the best way to communicate information to a diverse public.

Up until 1940, there were three major operators of New York subway and elevated lines, the privately owned Brooklyn–Manhattan Transit Corporation (BMT), the privately owned Interborough Rapid Transit Company (IRT) and the municipally owned Independent Subway System (ISS or ICOS before 1940, now IND).

Service labels have always been assigned based on their outer-borough line (Brooklyn on the BMT, Bronx on the IRT and IND) and then by the Manhattan trunk if necessary to distinguish multiple services on the same line.

=== BMT ===
BMT numbers, 1924–1967
	Pre-1967 service designation	1967 service designation	Line Name	Current service designation	Division
1	Q QB QT	D QB QJ	Brighton Beach Line	B and Q	Southern Division (subway)
2	N RR T TT	B N RJ RR	Fourth Avenue (Brooklyn) Line	D, N, R, and W	Southern Division (subway)
3	T TT	B	West End Line	D, R, and W	Southern Division (subway)
4	N	N NX	Sea Beach Line	N and W	Southern Division (subway)
5	D Culver Shuttle	F SS	Culver Line	F and <F>	Southern Division (elevated)
6			Fifth Avenue–Bay Ridge Line		Southern Division (elevated)
7	Franklin Shuttle	SS	Brighton–Franklin Line	S	Southern Division (elevated)
8	QB QT T	RR	Astoria Line	N and W	Queens Division (elevated)
9			Flushing Line	7 and <7>	Queens Division (elevated)
10		M	Myrtle Avenue–Chambers Street Line	M	Eastern Division (elevated)
11		MJ	Myrtle Avenue Line	M	Eastern Division (elevated)
12			Lexington Avenue Line		Eastern Division (elevated)
13			Fulton Street Line	A (Note: The IND Fulton Street Subway partially replaced the BMT Fulton Street El after unification. The A service uses the same route as the 13 from 80th Street to Lefferts Boulevard in Queens; the current Fulton Street Line is neither part of the Eastern Division nor connected to it.)	Eastern Division (elevated)
14		JJ KK M QJ RJ	Broadway (Brooklyn) Line	J, M, and Z	Eastern Division (elevated)
15		JJ KK QJ RJ	Jamaica Line	J and Z	Eastern Division (elevated)
16		LL	14th Street–Canarsie Line	L	Eastern Division (subway)

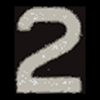
An example of an original BMT rollsign, used by D-type cars. This "2" was used to mark Fourth Avenue local service (now the R).

The BMT was the inheritor of subway, elevated and surface rapid transit lines that had been built in Brooklyn and Queens by a variety of previous operators. The BMT identified most of its lines by the common names given to them, which often dated back into the 19th century. Services on these lines usually had the same name as the line itself: for example, on the Culver Line, trains were signed Culver Local or Culver Express.

Partly as a result of its steam railroad history, BMT terminals were much more frequently named after neighborhoods or towns rather than streets, so trains were signed for Coney Island, Canarsie and Jamaica rather than Stillwell Avenue, Rockaway Parkway and 168th Street. Stations also tended to use local names, but this gradually changed as lines were upgraded, so that stations like Bath Junction on the Sea Beach Line became New Utrecht Avenue and Manhattan Terrace on the Brighton Line became Avenue J.

The BMT introduced numbers for all its services in 1924 but these were originally mostly for map purposes. The first train cars to display the numbers on the front of the train were D-type Triplex cars, which were introduced as prototypes in 1925, and then in production in 1927, and these only on the front of the trains. In 1931 these numbers were also used on 20 IND R1 cars when they were tested by the City on BMT lines, and also on 140 of these cars from 1949 to 1955 while in BMT service as well.

=== IRT ===
Early IRT numbers
	Uptown branch	Manhattan trunk line
1	Broadway–Seventh Avenue Line	Broadway–Seventh Avenue Line
2	White Plains Road Line	Broadway–Seventh Avenue Line
3	Lenox Avenue Line	Broadway–Seventh Avenue Line
4	Jerome Avenue Line	Lexington Avenue Line
5	White Plains Road Line	Lexington Avenue Line
6	Pelham Line	Lexington Avenue Line
7	Flushing Line	Queensborough Line
8 (Note: IRT 8 trains traveled between Manhattan and Astoria (this service was not labeled as such until 1948). A similar service operated by the BMT, also numbered 8, traveled only from Astoria to Queensboro Plaza. Both services were discontinued in 1949.)	Astoria Line	Queensborough Line
9 (Note: Label used until 1967.)	Dyre Avenue Shuttle (non-Manhattan service)	

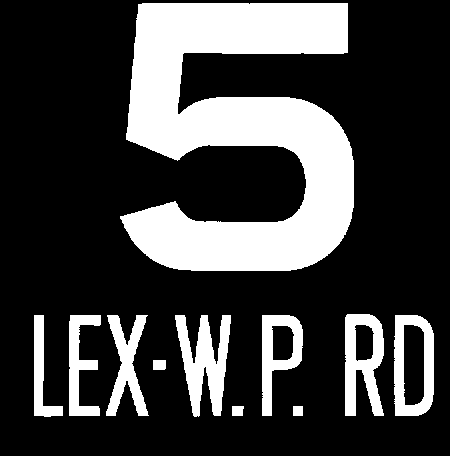
Typical pre-1967 IRT rollsign number

The IRT was the contractor with the City of New York to operate the first subway line; by that time it was already leasing all the elevated railways in Manhattan. Unlike the BMT, the IRT had multiple long mainlines from which several branch lines extended into the Bronx, Queens and Brooklyn. The IRT therefore named their services for these mainlines rather than their branches. The branch lines were referred to on the destination signs instead, so that typical signage read Lexington Avenue Express to Woodlawn — Jerome or Utica Avenue — Brooklyn, meaning Woodlawn on the Jerome Avenue Line and Utica Avenue on the Brooklyn Line. Where a service ended in downtown Manhattan, it simply carried the destination name, for example South Ferry or Chatham Square.

The IRT routes were given numbered designations in 1948 with the introduction of "R-type" rolling stock, which contained rollsigns with numbered designations for each service. The routes on the IRT Broadway–Seventh Avenue Line were given the designations 1, 2, and 3, while the routes on the IRT Lexington Avenue Line were given the designation 4, 5, and 6, The IRT Flushing Line received the designation 7, and the Bronx section of the IRT Third Avenue Line was given the designation 8. The designation 9 was assigned to trains on the IRT Dyre Avenue Line, which at the time was a shuttle service; the Bowling Green Shuttle and 42nd Street Shuttle did not receive numbers.

=== IND ===
Early IND letters
	Uptown branch	Manhattan trunk line
A	Washington Heights Line	Eighth Avenue Line
B	Washington Heights Line	Sixth Avenue Line
C	Concourse Line	Eighth Avenue Line
D	Concourse Line	Sixth Avenue Line
E	Queens Boulevard Line	Eighth Avenue Line
F	Queens Boulevard Line	Sixth Avenue Line
G	Brooklyn–Queens Crosstown Line (non-Manhattan service)	
H	Fulton Street Line (non-Manhattan service)	
S	Specials (no consistent usage)	

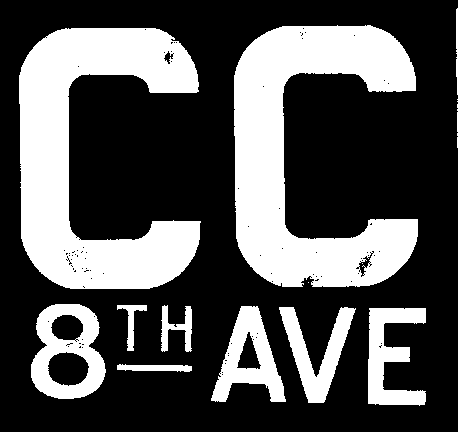
Typical pre-1967 IND rollsign letter

The IND system was similar to the IRT but reversed the terminal and line name on the destination signs: Queens – 179th St. for 179th Street terminal on the Queens Boulevard Line. The IND also adopted a similar logical labeling system, but used them publicly on trains and maps. Single letters were used to indicate an express service and double letters indicated local service. For example, the CC ran local and the C ran express on the Concourse and Eighth Avenue Lines.

Unlike the IRT labels, the IND letter system today is significantly different from the original service pattern.

=== Unification and post-unification ===
==== BMT/IND service label integration ====
BMT letters and old numbers, 1960 mapping
Letter	Old number	Line
J	15	Jamaica Line (express)
K	14	Broadway–Brooklyn Line to Canarsie Line or Jamaica Line (local)
L	16	Canarsie Line via 14th Street
M	10	Myrtle Avenue Line from Lower Manhattan
MJ	11	Myrtle Avenue Line from Downtown Brooklyn
N	4	Sea Beach Line
Q	1	Brighton Beach Line
R	2	Fourth Avenue Line
T	3	West End Line
SS	5	Culver Line
SS	7	Brighton–Franklin Line

When all three systems came under city ownership in 1940, essentially nothing was done to standardize signage for two decades. Stations on the IRT and BMT still said Interborough or BMT Lines or sometimes older designations. Services continued to be signed by their traditional methods for each system. IND and post-Second World War ("R-type") equipment used BMT numbers when operating on BMT services. With the introduction of R12 equipment on the IRT in 1948, IRT subway services (except for the 42nd Street Shuttle) began using the route numbers still used today, which had been used internally but not on trains or maps. Astoria Line trains were only signed as 8 for a year, after which the line, which had been shared with the BMT, was converted for BMT operation only (and the Flushing Line carried only IRT trains).

In 1960, with the delivery of the first R27 class cars for the BMT, the New York City Transit Authority (TA), which had become the operator of the combined system in 1953, began the introduction of letters for BMT services in anticipation of integrating the BMT and IND operationally. The last IND letter used was H, and the letter I was skipped as being too similar to the number 1. The BMT Eastern Division services got the letters J, K, L and M, while the BMT Southern Division services were designated N, Q, R and T. S was still reserved for "Special" and SS began to be used for shuttles.

Since the BMT was not amenable to the neat IND system, the TA had to make some compromises. They tried to follow the IND system of single-letter expresses and double-letter locals, but the system began to break down under the complex BMT routings. Where on the IND a local simply doubled the express letter (A Eighth Avenue Express, AA Eighth Avenue Local), some lines had multiple local services with different routings. For instance the two Brighton Local services, one via the Manhattan Bridge and the other via the Montague Street Tunnel, were designated QB and QT respectively. The TA had no specific lettering plan for the two Wall Street special rush-hour services, so it just designated these M (Nassau Street Express) temporarily, a letter reserved for use on the BMT Myrtle Avenue Line's Nassau Street service.

During this period, the TA did not change sign rolls on BMT equipment (the D-types and R16s) that carried numbers, so that on the Brighton Line, the R27-operated locals were signed QB or QT but the D-type-operated expresses continued to carry the number 1.

==== Chrystie Street Connection ====
1	2	3	4	5	6	7	8
A	AA	B	CC	D	E	EE	F
GG	HH	J	JJ	K	KK	LL	M
MJ	N	NX	QB	QJ	RR	RJ	TT
SS	145 Street; 135 Street			SS	Dyre Avenue; East 180 Street
SS	Bowling Green; South Ferry			SS	Grand Central; Times Square
SS	Prospect Park; Franklin Avenue			SS	9 Avenue; Ditmas Avenue

Former service colors, 1967–1979
(shuttles all became green in 1968)

A typical post-1967 side rollsign

In anticipation of the 1967 opening of the Chrystie Street Connection, which combined two major BMT and IND services as single routes and resulted in numerous other changes (especially on the 14 and 15), the TA decided to adopt universal systems of signage and nomenclature. The rationale was that this would make the system more consistent and more understandable for newcomers to the city and tourists, who were presumed to be uninterested in or even confused by historic or community names, or might not be native English speakers.

- Branch line names would be eliminated from signage and maps; all services that had Manhattan mainlines would be identified by those names only.
- Services would be identified only by letters or numbers wherever possible, even when announcing reroutings.
- Terminals would be identified by street names rather than community names where that existed. This had actually begun with the introduction of R-type equipment, when destinations such as Woodlawn and Canarsie were changed to read Woodlawn Road (which is no longer the name of a road) and Rockaway Parkway.
- All services would be color-coded for map and rollsign purposes. This proved a daunting task, since the TA wanted to ensure that no two services with exactly the same color would operate over the same line. With a lot of imagination and a lot of color variations, this goal was achieved but proved unwieldy. The colors did not have any particular logic and still produced ambiguity; notably the A service and the E service shared miles of line between Midtown Manhattan and the Rockaway Line in Queens, one as an express, the other as a local. But the A was colored dark blue and the E light blue, not always easily distinguishable.

The 8 designation was brought back for the only remaining IRT elevated service, the IRT Third Avenue Line in the Bronx but trains never displayed the number. When the Lo-V cars (which did not have front signs) were replaced by R12 cars the front roll signs in use did not contain the number 8 and instead displayed the word shuttle. For map and sign purposes MJ was assigned to the last old-style elevated line, standing for "Myrtle Avenue Line to Jay Street", while the "Myrtle Avenue Line to Chambers Street" subway service would finally receive its M designation. The short-lived new Sea Beach Line super-express service was made NX. The Q, QT and T disappeared when the Chrystie Street Connection opened; thus they never had colors (until after the elimination of double letters, when the Q came back; by that time the current color system was in place). By 1968, all shuttles (SS) were green. For a short time, the off-hour shuttle between Metropolitan Avenue and Myrtle Avenue was added in 1969 when the MJ service to Jay Street was discontinued, and that part of the line abandoned. The shuttle was soon renamed "M", however, as it only ran when the M did not run to Manhattan.

The system immediately showed evidence of problems for various reasons:

- Different services at common stations shared common destinations by different routes. N, B and QJ services arriving at DeKalb Avenue, for example, all had Coney Island as a destination, but had no mention of the widely separated routes (Sea Beach Line, West End Line, Brighton Line) used to get there.
- Service labels are ephemeral. The TA has frequently shifted lettered routes from one branch line to another, and introduced, changed or deleted letters, making a description like "the D train" meaningless. The D service has been on three completely different Brooklyn branch lines since 1954. K was introduced for a service on the Broadway-Brooklyn Line but was later used for the IND Eighth Avenue Line local which had formerly been AA.
- The same lettered or numbered lines may have different destinations by time of day, despite a largely successful effort to minimize this problem.

==== Elimination of double letters ====
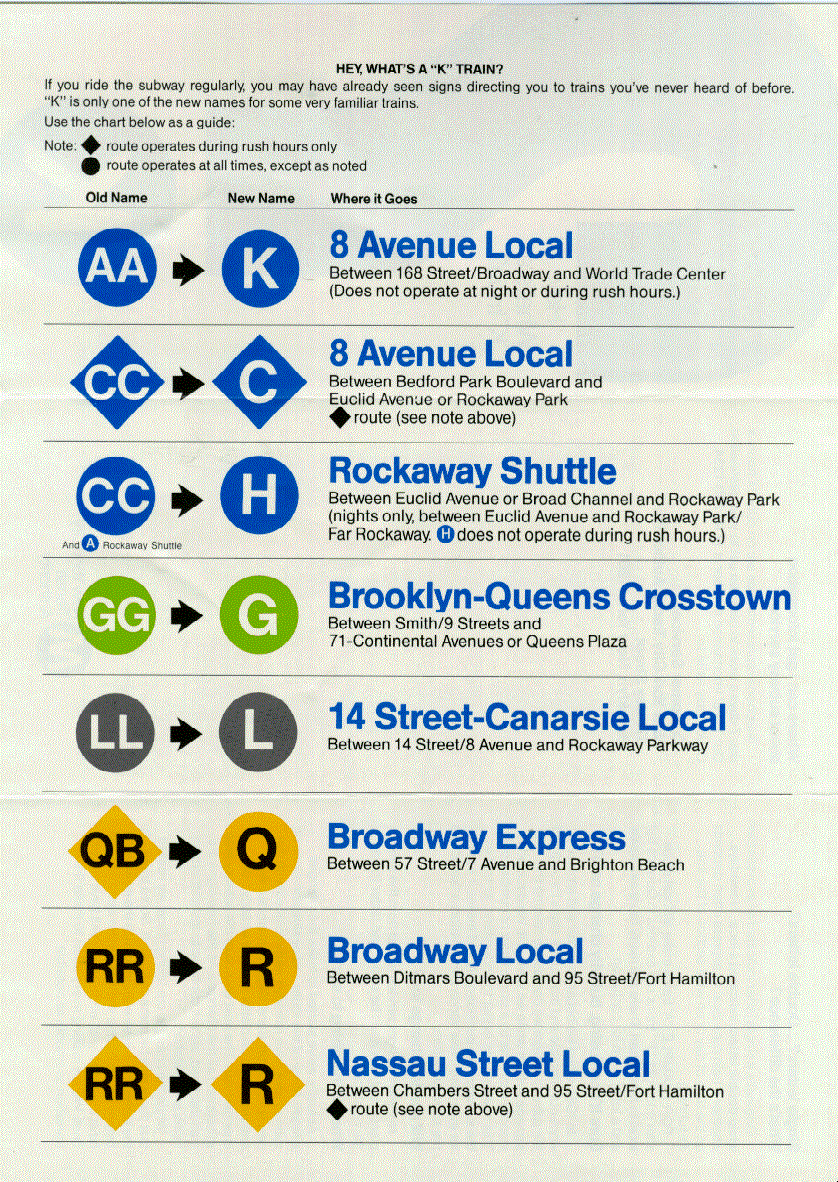
This brochure was published in 1985 to explain the relabeling of double-letter subway services

On June 25, 1979, the former color scheme was scrapped, and the TA settled on the more coherent policy of assigning the same color to every service on each Manhattan mainline, as well as the color lime green for the IND Crosstown Line, which does not enter Manhattan. The same colors are still used today. Nevertheless, no New York subway line is officially referred to by its color, e.g., BMT Broadway Line services as the "Yellow Line." While referring to lines by their color, as is common in some other cities, is a convenient shorthand for the regions of Manhattan where lines and colors are relatively unambiguous (from roughly Houston Street to 50th Street, and further uptown for the "red" and "green" lines), this practice would be confusing outside of that region (due to multiple services being assigned the same color).

AA	→	K	8th Avenue Local
CC	→	C	8th Avenue Local (rush hour "diamond" service)
CC/A	→	H	Rockaway Shuttle
GG	→	G	Brooklyn-Queens Crosstown
LL	→	L	14th Street-Canarsie Local
QB	→	Q	Broadway Express (had been rush hour "diamond" service)
RR	→	R	Broadway Local
RR	→	R	Nassau Street Local (rush hour "diamond" service; shown as both a yellow diamond and a brown diamond)

1985 letter changes

On May 5, 1985, the last significant change in route identification policy was made after the TA had decided in 1981 that the single and double letter system of the original IND was no longer meaningful, given that there were many services that were express for part of their route and local for other parts. In most cases, this was accomplished by simply eliminating the second letter in route designations. There is no longer a letter designation for specials (formerly S).

By the 1990s, the TA were moving steadily toward using traditional line names on maps and especially on signage. All of the southern Brooklyn subway lines now show the traditional line names (except for the BMT Fourth Avenue Line) in order to distinguish between services going to Coney Island via different lines. On BMT/IND equipment, branch line names frequently appear on operating trains, in addition to the route letter. R32 equipment with rollsigns, for example, may read:

207 Street
Manhattan
Mott Av
Far Rockaway
Wash Hts/8 Av/Fulton

Ditmars Blvd
Astoria
Stillwell Av
Coney Island
Astoria/Bway/Sea Beach

57 St–7 Av
Manhattan
Stillwell Av
Coney Island
Broadway/Brighton

Newer rollsigns on R40 up to the R68A (including the former rollsigns on the R44 and R46 that now have LCD displays) have the route's bullet on the left side, and the two destinations on the right side. A rollsign on an R68 D train may read:

Norwood, Bronx; 205 St
Coney Island

One change which precedes pre-unification has to do with the use of locality names. While these were discouraged during the 1960s after they had been inherited from private operators, many terminal stations are once again described by both a community and a street name, e.g., Inwood–207th Street for the northern destination of the A service, and Wakefield–241st Street for the northern destination of the 2 service.

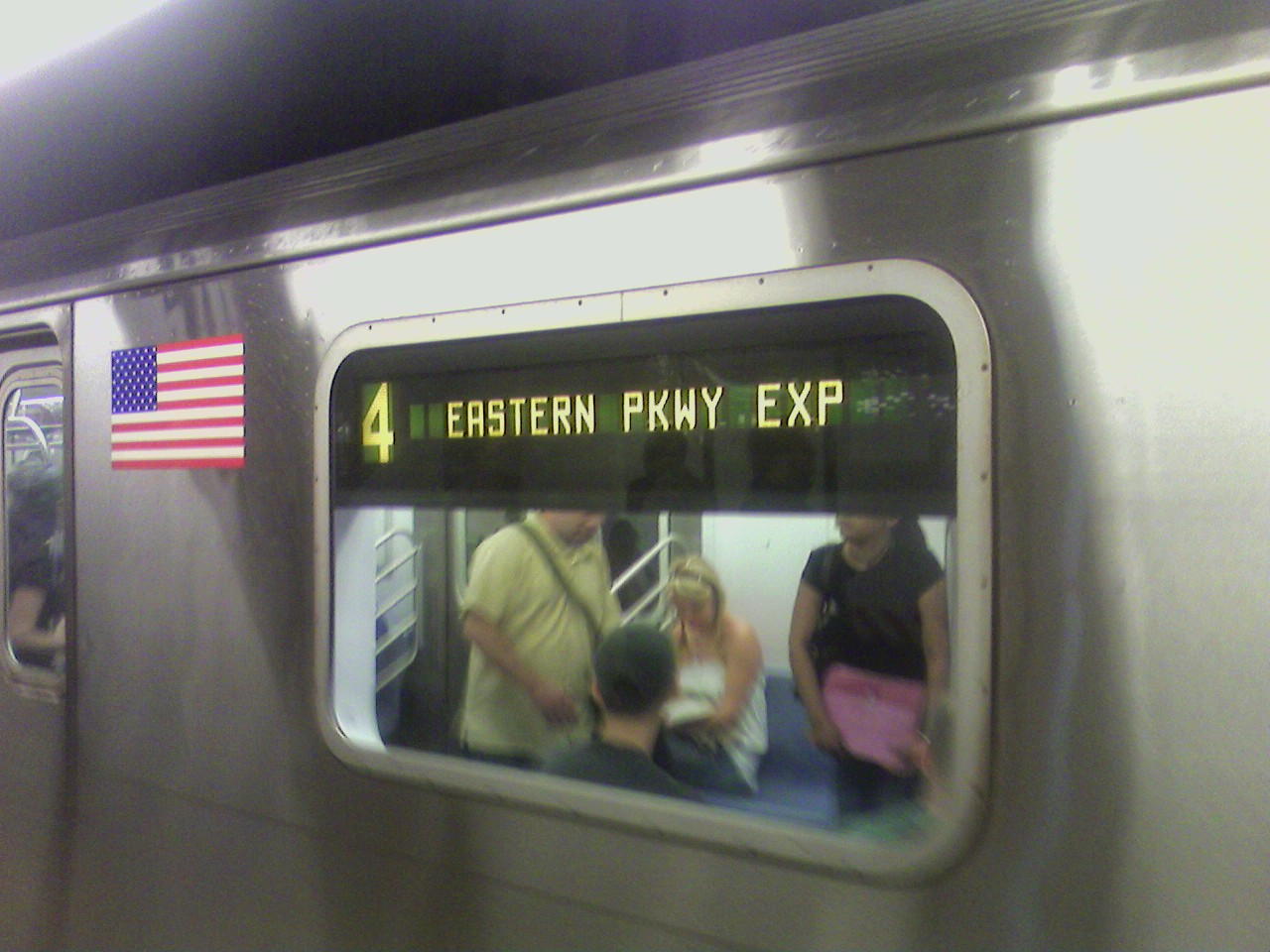
An R142 side sign indicating that this 4 train runs express on the IRT Eastern Parkway Line

The same sign shown in animation

The JFK Express, started in 1978 and discontinued in 1990, used a turquoise bullet with an airplane symbol; this stayed through the color change. The color will be reused in the distant future when the Second Avenue Subway is complete.

==== Route consistency ====
Since the unsuccessful attempts at applying the briefly popular schematic theory of diagrammatic maps, line-by-line color-coding, and exclusive use of numbers and letters for service and line descriptions, the MTA has moved steadily toward a more traditional approach, with more geographically correct maps and use of traditional line and community names on maps and public signage. Concurrently, it has been refining its use of the number and letter system to try to achieve consistency across the system.

One major push has been an attempt to have as many services as possible serve the same stations, routes and terminals at all times, with the major exception for most services being the early morning hours of approximately midnight to 5 a.m. For instance, the B and C swapped northern terminals in 1998 so the C could serve the entire local portion of the IND Eighth Avenue Line at all times except nights; previously, the A had made two local stops north of 145th Street on weekends, while being express on the whole line south of 145th Street, because the B did not operate in Manhattan on weekends. In another case, the MTA took advantage of unavoidable service changes forced by the partial Manhattan Bridge closures to swap the Brooklyn segments of the B and D services, with the B becoming the BMT Brighton Line express service and the D becoming the BMT West End Line local (previously the B had been the West End Local and the D the Brighton Local). This enabled the D, a full-time service, to operate continuously on the same route and terminals from Norwood–205th Street in the Bronx to Coney Island–Stillwell Avenue in Brooklyn, while the part-time B became the part-time Brighton Express service, formerly served by the express <Q> (notated with a diamond).

== Table of service label and color use ==
This is a table of when each service has existed (and been signed for the public). Shuttles were SS until 1985, when they became S (which had been used for specials). Colors reflected in the table correspond to the official MTA issued maps; rollsign colors are not always consistent with that.

Various colors were used for shuttles in 1967; in 1968 all six became green, and in 1979 all shuttles became dark gray.
