= 8 (New York City Subway service) =

Former New York City Subway service

8 was a designation given to two New York City Subway services. It was first used by the Brooklyn–Manhattan Transit Corporation for its Astoria Line from 1917 to 1949. The ex-Interborough Rapid Transit Company (IRT) Third Avenue El subsequently used the designation between 1967 and 1973.

== Astoria Line ==
The 8 label was first used for the Astoria Line, which opened on February 1, 1917, as an extension of the Queensboro Line (now part of the Flushing line) from Queensboro Plaza. The Corona Line (now also part of the Flushing Line) had already been built as another branch from Queensboro Plaza; when the Astoria Line opened half the trains ran to each terminal. At the time, the Queensboro Line ended on the other side of the Steinway Tunnel at Grand Central.

Tracks opened over the Queensboro Bridge on July 23, 1917, allowing elevated trains of the IRT Second Avenue Line to operate to Queensborough Plaza and then over either the Astoria or Corona line. Once this link opened, all elevated trains went to Astoria, and all subway trains to Corona, but this was modified by 1923, with both divisions running on each line. On March 22, 1926, the Queensborough Line (and Astoria service) was extended west to Fifth Avenue, and it was completed west to Times Square on March 14, 1927.

BMT shuttles (also labeled internally as 8) began using the Astoria Line on April 8, 1923, with a transfer to the Broadway Line at Queensborough Plaza. This joint operation ended on October 17, 1949, and all IRT trains started operating to Flushing (where the Corona Line had been extended in 1928) and all BMT trains operated to Astoria. The numbers were only publicly used starting in 1948, so the public only knew the Astoria Line's IRT services as the 8 for about a year. Direct service between Astoria and Times Square ended on July 24, 1949.

== Third Avenue Line ==
- Third Avenue Local

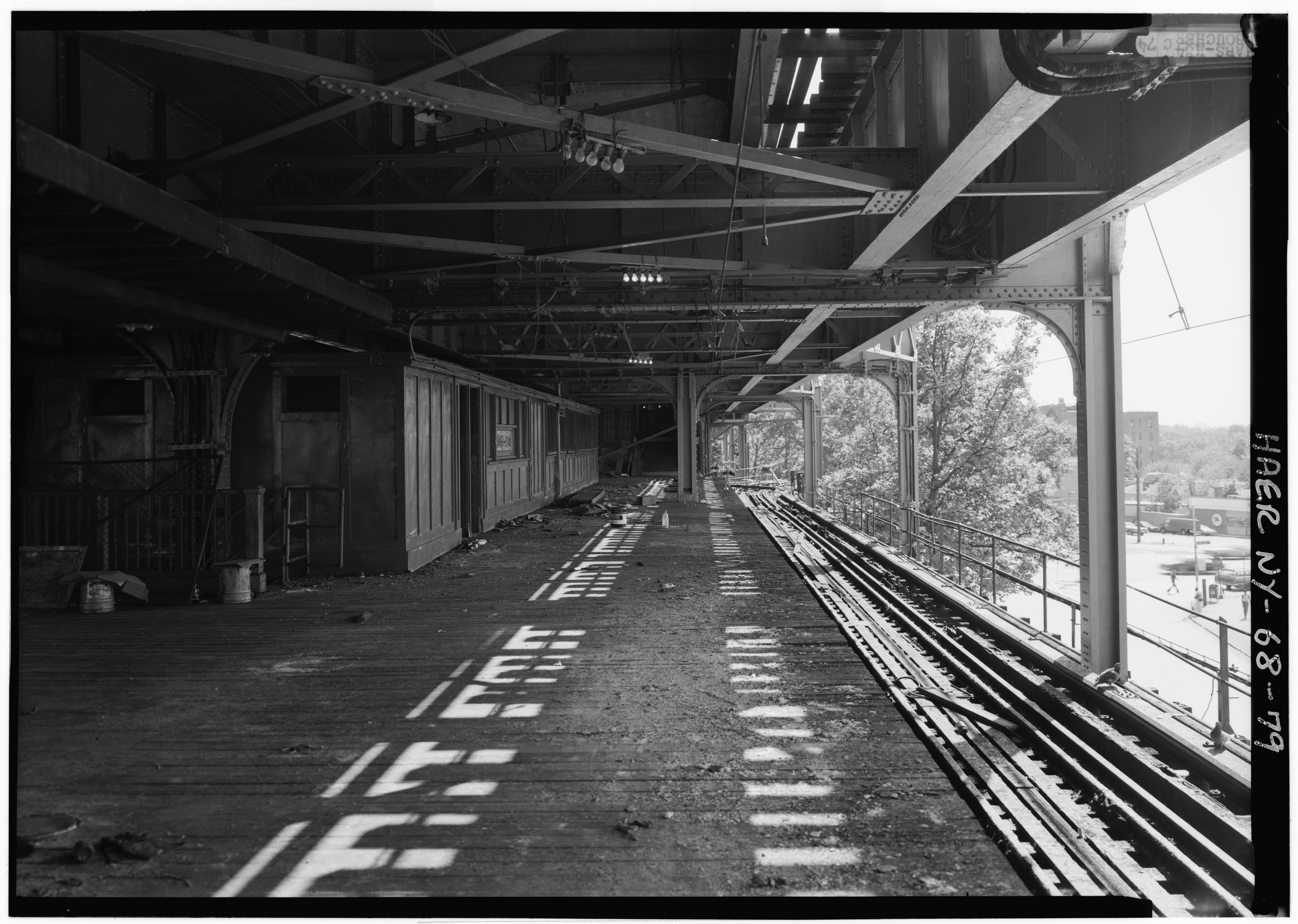
- Gun Hill Road in 1984
- Northern end: Gun Hill Road
- Southern end: 149th Street
- Stations: 15
- Started service: November 26, 1967; 58 years ago
- Discontinued: April 28, 1973; 52 years ago

When the Chrystie Street Connection opened in late 1967, the New York City Transit Authority assigned labels to all services. The only remaining IRT elevated line, the IRT Third Avenue Line in the Bronx, was too long to be a shuttle, so was assigned the number 8, which had been unused since 1949. This service, running between 149th Street and Gun Hill Road, ran until April 28, 1973, when the Third Avenue Line closed. It was replaced by the Bx55 bus route until 2013, when most of the former route started being served by the Bx15 Limited. The 8 bullet was marked only on maps and station signs, never on subway cars, which instead displayed SHUTTLE and the destination.

== Present status ==
Current rollsigns have an 8 (as well as a 10 and a 12) in a forest green circle, the same color as the 4, 5 and 6, the IRT Lexington Avenue Line services.

In 2020, the MTA used a hypothetical 8 designation as an express service on the IRT Broadway–Seventh Avenue Line in a simulation of proposed infrastructure improvements to reduce the impact of the bottleneck that is Nostrand Avenue Junction as part of the IRT Capacity Study. As part of the hybrid operating plan, 3 and 5 trains would switch termini in Brooklyn, though the 5 would run express on the IRT Eastern Parkway Line to Crown Heights–Utica Avenue. This change would eliminate the need for 5 trains from the Eastern Parkway Line express tracks to merge onto the local tracks to go to or from the Nostrand Avenue Line, allowing for reduced congestion and increased service. To cover local service between Franklin Avenue and Utica Avenue, a new service, the 8, would be operated, running between Wakefield–241st Street in the Bronx and New Lots Avenue in Brooklyn, with a headway of ten minutes during the peak. The study recommended the infrastructure be built that would allow for the service's creation, including the installation of new crossovers north of Utica Avenue, but did not explicitly propose the new service.

The MTA's 20-year needs assessment in 2023 further studied the recommended service changes for the Nostrand Avenue Junction, including the creation of an 8 service, and concluded that their implementation would yield "significant benefits."

== Signage history ==
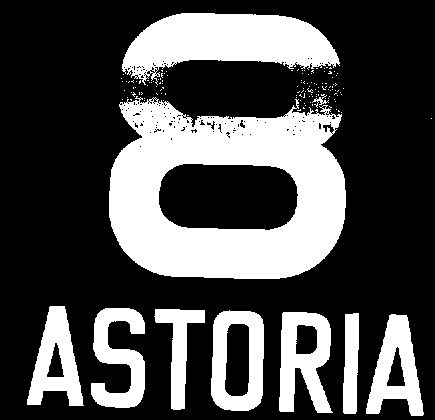
Pre-1967 bullet used for the BMT Astoria Line

1967–1973 3 Avenue bullet

Unused 8 bullet from 1989

== See also ==
- BMT 8, the BMT service that operated in tandem with this service until 1949
- Unused New York City Subway service labels
