= Bowling Green–South Ferry shuttle =

Former New York City Subway service

- Bowling Green/South Ferry Shuttle

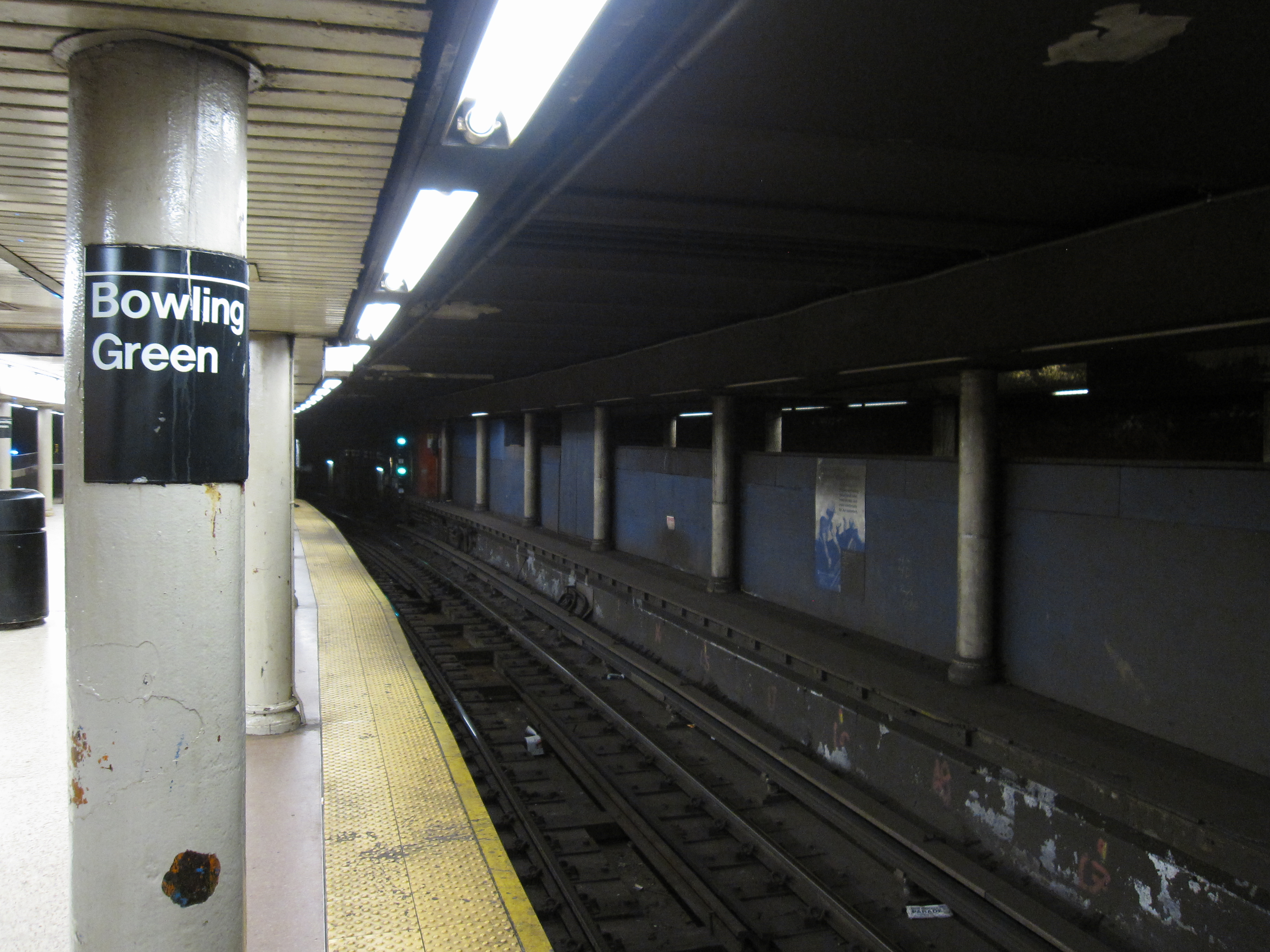
- Boarded up shuttle platform on the right at Bowling Green station.
- Northern end: Bowling Green
- Southern end: South Ferry (inner loop)
- Stations: 2
- Rolling stock: R12
- Started service: February 1909
- Discontinued: February 13, 1977

The Bowling Green–South Ferry shuttle was a shuttle service of the New York City Subway system that operated between Bowling Green and the inner loop platform at South Ferry. It operated to provide South Ferry service for IRT Lexington Avenue Line riders during hours when the 5 service did not stop at South Ferry (during the daytime on weekdays, and at first, also late nights). Because the inner loop station that the shuttle used at the South Ferry station was on such a tight curve, there was no continuous platform; instead four openings in the tunnel wall led into the station. Four R12 cars that were used on the shuttle, 5703–5706, which were modified and equipped so that only the center door of each car would open at one of the open spaces.

== History ==
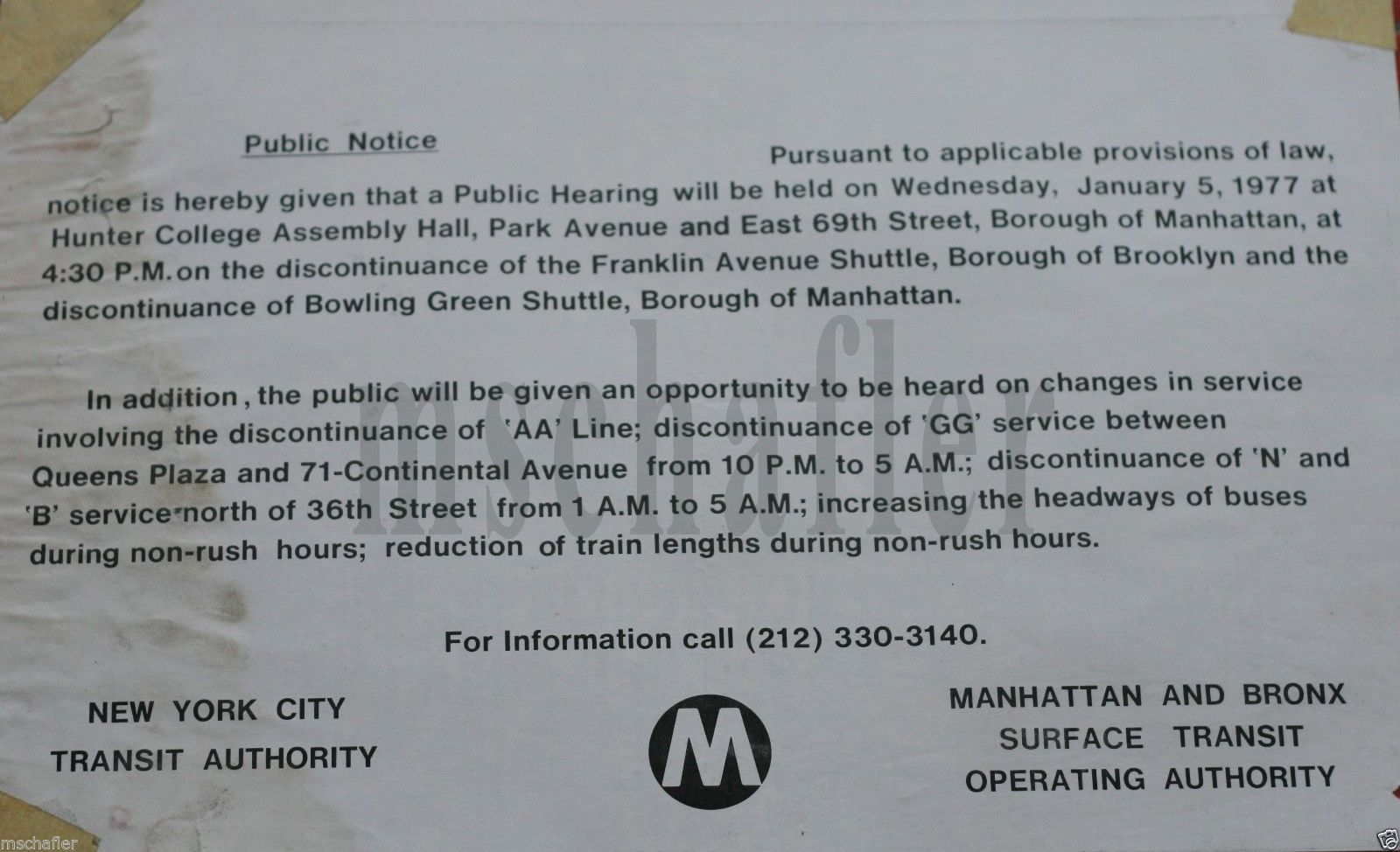
Poster announcing the 1977 public hearing which was held to discuss the planned elimination of the shuttle and other service cuts.

The shuttle was first operated in February 1909 to allow all rush hour trains to go to Brooklyn; the shuttle only operated during rush hours. Formerly, all Broadway express trains had terminated at South Ferry, with all Lenox Avenue express trains through to Brooklyn. Locals all ended at City Hall.

From the line's opening until 1956, a small fleet of Deck Roof Hi-V cars were used on the shuttle, when they were replaced by a similarly small fleet of Standard Lo-V cars. These served the shuttle until August 1964, when they were subsequently replaced with the aforementioned R12 cars that had their door circuits modified so that only the doors which aligned with the portals would open.

In 1967, the Bowling Green–South Ferry shuttle and all others in the New York City Subway system was given the label SS.

The New York City Transit Authority decided that the shuttle was more trouble to operate than the benefit it provided. At midnight between February 12 and 13, 1977, the Bowling Green shuttle was discontinued without replacement; because of this, IRT Lexington Avenue Line passengers have had to walk a relatively short distance from Bowling Green station in order to access South Ferry and the Staten Island Ferry terminal.

In August 1989, the MTA proposed linking the Bowling Green platform to the Whitehall Street station of the BMT Broadway Line and the South Ferry station of the IRT Broadway–Seventh Avenue Line. The two latter stations were connected in 2009. Since 2007, there has been an entrance to the Bowling Green station in front of the Alexander Hamilton U.S. Custom House (now the George Gustav Heye Center), just around the corner from two entrances to the Whitehall Street station (which are set into the building's eastern elevation).

== Signage history ==
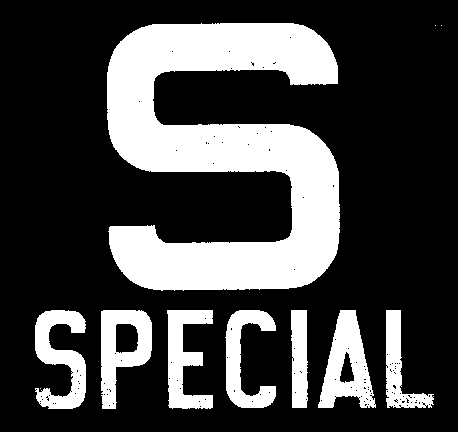
The "S" bullet was also used instead of the "Shuttle" bullet

1967-1968 bullet

1968-1977 bullet
