= S (New York City Subway service) =

New York City Subway shuttle services

The current bullet for the three shuttles

Three services in the New York City Subway are designated as a S (shuttle) service. These services operate as full-time or almost full-time shuttles. In addition, three services run as shuttles during late night hours but retain their regular service designations.

== Shuttle services ==
=== Official designations ===
All of the following services are officially labeled S. The "NYCT designator" column stands for New York City Transit's internal designation for the service.

Shuttle name	NYCT designator	Division	Northern terminal	Southern terminal	Service hours	Notes	Image
42nd Street Shuttle	0 (zero)	A	Times Square	Grand Central	All times except late nights	Two trains independently operate on each of the two tracks. Rebuilt and reconfigured for ADA-accessibility from 2019 to 2022.	42nd Street Shuttle at Grand Central
Rockaway Park Shuttle	H	B	Broad Channel or Rockaway Boulevard (Note: During summer weekends, the Rockaway Park shuttle is extended to Rockaway Boulevard.)	Rockaway Park–Beach 116th Street	All times	Three trains operate on the double-tracked Rockaway Park branch of the IND Rockaway Line.	Rockaway Park Shuttle at Broad Channel
Franklin Avenue Shuttle	S	B	Franklin Avenue	Prospect Park	All times	Two trains operate on the partially single-tracked BMT Franklin Avenue Line, passing each other near Botanic Garden.	Franklin Avenue Shuttle at Botanic Garden

=== Late-night shuttles ===
Route	Name	Northern terminal	Southern terminal	Notes	Image
"5" train	Dyre Avenue Shuttle	Eastchester–Dyre Avenue	East 180th Street	Formerly designated 9, before the line became an IRT line, and SS.	Dyre Avenue-bound 5 shuttle train at Pelham Parkway
"A" train	Lefferts Boulevard Shuttle	Ozone Park-Lefferts Boulevard	Euclid Avenue	Operates concurrently with regular A service to Far Rockaway. Designated (gray A) on the late night map and on trains.	Lefferts Boulevard-bound A shuttle train at 80th Street
"M" train	Myrtle Avenue Shuttle	Middle Village–Metropolitan Avenue	Myrtle Avenue	Formerly designated SS. See Myrtle Shuttle (1969–1972) below.	A weekend R160A M shuttle train on the center track prior to the extension of weekend M service from Myrtle Avenue to Essex Street

== Former uses ==
Other routes have in the past been designated S or SS; the label has also been used for temporary shuttles due to construction. Before June 1979, all shuttles had the label SS; the designation S was reserved for "special" services, including IND trains to Aqueduct Racetrack. The SS label was first applied in 1967, when some services were relabeled due to the completion of the Chrystie Street Connection (see New York City Subway nomenclature § History).

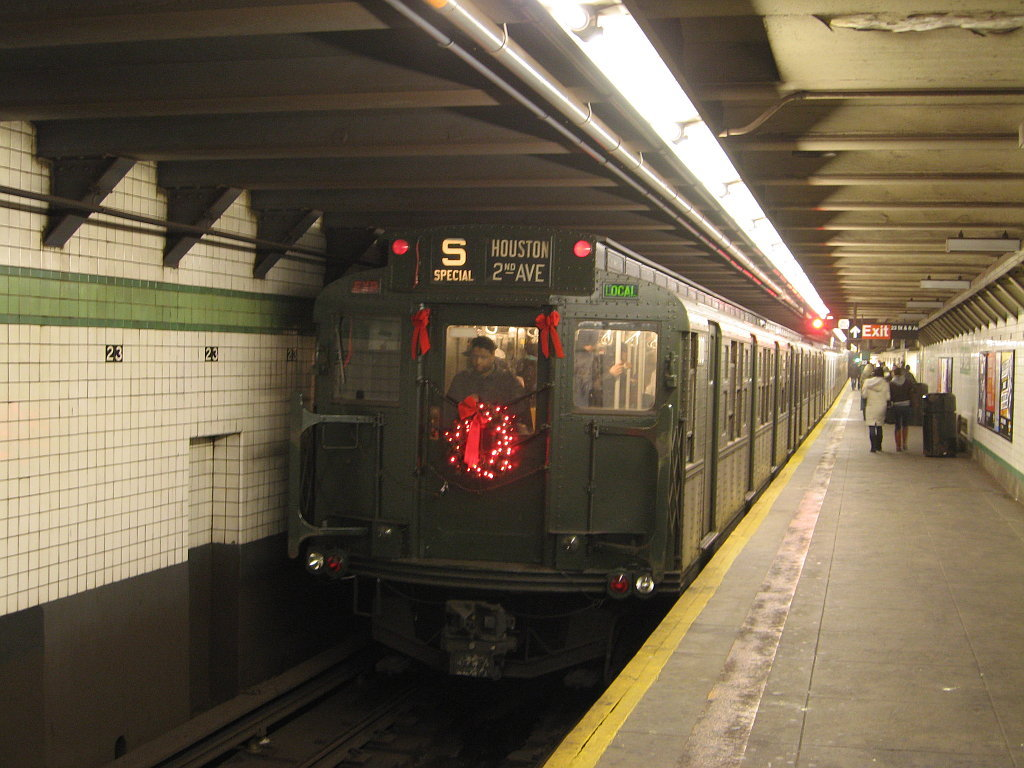
The "2007 Holiday Shopper's Special", which ran on December Sundays, is a train of museum subway cars. This particular car is displaying the (former) S Special on its rollsign at the 23rd Street (Sixth Avenue) station.

Former uses of the S or SS designation include:

- Bowling Green – South Ferry Shuttle (1909–1977)
- Culver Shuttle (1954–1975)
- Sixth Avenue Shuttle (1986–1988) – ran between 57th Street and Grand Street
- 63rd Street Shuttle (1998–1999, 2023-2024)
- Grand Street Shuttle (2001–2004, 2013)

Some shuttle routes also used the H or HH designation, which were the last to be assigned to the Independent Subway System. Former uses include the Court Street Shuttle from 1936 to 1946 and Rockaway Park Shuttle until 1993, when that route's label was changed to a blue S. A temporary shuttle that opened in November 2012 after Hurricane Sandy destroyed track connecting the Rockaways to the rest of the system used the H designation.

When the Transit Authority began assigning labels to all services, the Third Avenue Elevated was designated as 8 because it was deemed too long to be considered a "shuttle". However, trains on this line showed SHUTTLE on their rollsigns instead of "8". The service was discontinued in 1973.

=== Full-time shuttles ===
==== Nassau Street Shuttle (1999) ====
This shuttle ran only from May to September 1999 during the rehabilitation of the Williamsburg Bridge. The shuttle ran from 6:00 am to 10:00 pm daily from Essex Street to Broad Street (Chambers Street on weekends, late nights, and evenings).

==== Myrtle Shuttle (2017–2018) ====
Two trains operated separately on each of two tracks on the BMT Myrtle Avenue Line between Myrtle-Wyckoff Avenues and Middle Village-Metropolitan Avenue. They ran at all times between September 2, 2017, and April 27, 2018, due to construction on the BMT Myrtle Avenue Line's connector with the BMT Jamaica Line. It was designated as an orange "M" on maps, schedules, and station and service notice signs, and as a brown "M" on the R42 rolling stock, which still had the brown "M" emblems that the route used before 2010.

=== Part-time shuttles ===
==== Lenox Shuttle (mid-1900s – early 1970s) ====
The Lenox Terminal Shuttle (also Lenox Shuttle and Lenox Avenue Shuttle) ran between 148th Street and 135th Street when the 3 did not run. Prior to the opening of the 148th Street station on May 13, 1968, it was called the 145th Street Shuttle, running only to 145th Street, and only from 9:00 pm to 1:00 am. It was in place by 1918, but may have been started in 1905 when the IRT White Plains Road Line opened to the IRT Lenox Avenue Line.

Between 1969 and 1972, it was folded into the 3, but continued to run as a shuttle at those times. Late night 3 service ended on September 10, 1995, due to low ridership, and was not restored until July 27, 2008. During this time, the route was served by a free overnight shuttle bus.

==== Myrtle Shuttle (1969–1972) ====
After the BMT Myrtle Avenue Line south of Broadway ceased operation on October 3, 1969, the MJ service was discontinued and the current nighttime M shuttle was formed, using the lower-level platforms in the same station complex. Prior to 2014, when the M was extended to Essex Street during weekend days, it operated on weekends as well. However, this service was labeled SS and considered a separate route from the M until the two routes merged in August 1972.

==== Bay Ridge Shuttle (1990–2002; 2004–2016) ====
On September 30, 1990, late night R trains began operating as a shuttle in Brooklyn, between 36th Street (cut back from 57th Street in Manhattan) and 95th Street. In 1999, northbound trains began skipping 53rd Street and 45th Streets to avoid being on the track at 36th Street that is used by through trains when discharging shuttle passengers. From September 8, 2002, until February 22, 2004, this service was extended northward to Pacific Street, due to reconstruction of the Coney Island station, running express north of 36th Street. On November 5, 2016, late night R trains were extended to Whitehall Street in Lower Manhattan.

== Signage History ==
Before 1967

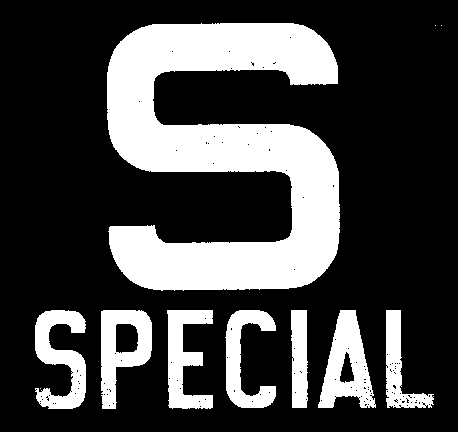
Several shuttle services used either this bullet or the "Shuttle" bullet
1967-1979

1967-1968 42nd St bullet

1967-1968 Culver bullet

1967-1968 Franklin Av bullet

1967-1968 South Ferry bullet

1967-1968 Lenox Av bullet

1968-1979 bullet for Dyre Avenue and later all shuttles
Post 1979

The current bullet used on all shuttles since 1979

The first alternate bullet used for Rockaway Shuttle service since 1992

1997-2001 63rd St shuttle bullet via 6th Avenue

1998-2001 63rd St shuttle bullet via Broadway

Alternate bullet used for the Franklin Avenue shuttle since 2018

The second alternate bullet used for the Rockaway Shuttle since 2018
