= Esplanade (Bronx) =

Street in the Bronx, New York

- Owner: City of New York
- Maintained by: NYCDOT
- Length: 0.8 mi (1.3 km)
- Location: Bronx, New York City
- South end: Paulding Avenue in Morris Park
- Major junctions: Pelham Parkway in Morris Park
- North end: Mace Avenue in Pelham Gardens

The Esplanade, also known as Esplanade Avenue, is a 0.8-mile (1.3 km) street with a series of green traffic medians in the Morris Park and Pelham Gardens neighborhoods of the Bronx in New York City. The street was constructed in 1912 atop a covered trench of the New York, Westchester and Boston Railway that was cut through a hill. Atop the hill, Esplanade intersects with Pelham Parkway, a road with its own series of green traffic medians designated as parkland.

== Transportation ==
The former New York, Westchester and Boston Railway line, which runs under the Esplanade, was acquired by the city in 1940 and is now the New York City Subway's IRT Dyre Avenue Line (5 train). At the Esplanade's southern end is the Morris Park station. The platform is elevated at the portal into the tunnel that runs beneath the Esplanade. On the northern side of Pelham Parkway at the intersection of the Esplanade and Laconia Avenue, is the Pelham Parkway station, a former express railroad station that closed in 1937 and reopened in 1941 as a subway station. It is the only underground station on the Dyre Avenue Line.

== Memorials ==
The green spaces on the Esplanade have received designations by the city in honor of local residents who served the country in military service. The triangle bound by the Esplanade, Pelham Parkway and Laconia Avenue is designated in 1993 as the Rudy Macina Peace Memorial Plaza. Macina designed the memorial in the center of the plaza, which contains monuments surrounding a flagpole, honoring the veterans of the Persian Gulf War, Vietnam War, Korean War, World War II, and World War I. The plaza facing the entrance of the Pelham Parkway station is named Alfred E. Santangelo Plaza in honor of a former local Congressman.

The median strip of the Esplanade at the corner of Astor Avenue was designated in 1962 in memory of Private Sidney Weissman, a local resident killed in the sinking of the HMT Rohna.
