= Gun Hill Road station (IRT Dyre Avenue Line) =

New York City Subway station in the Bronx

Gun Hill Road
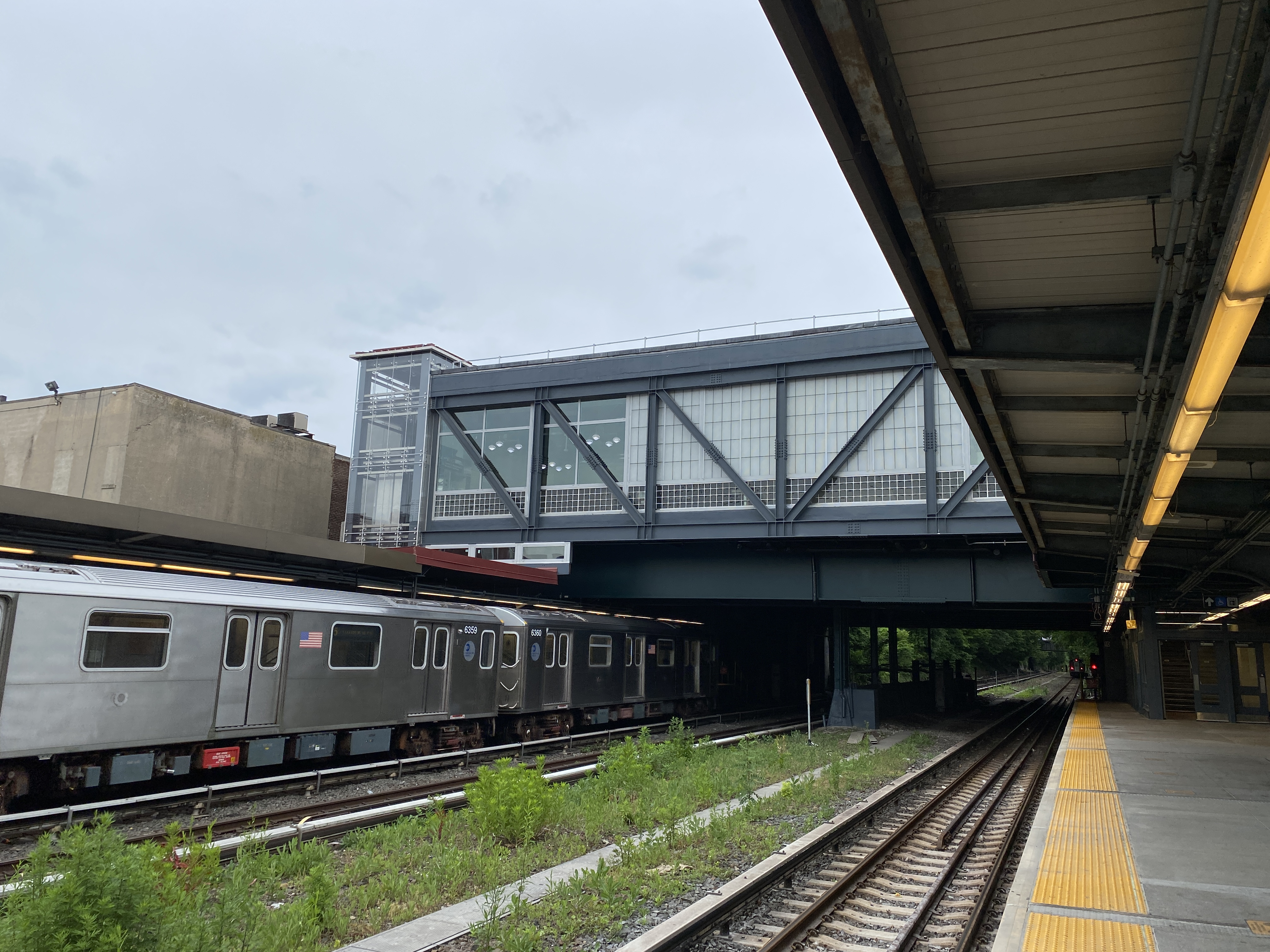
- The renovated station

Station statistics
- Address: East Gun Hill Road & Seymour Avenue; Bronx, New York
- Borough: The Bronx
- Locale: Baychester, Allerton, Pelham Gardens
- Coordinates: 40.87017°N 73.845806°W
- Division: A (IRT, formerly NYW&B)
- Line: IRT Dyre Avenue Line
- Services: 5 (all times)
- Transit: NYCT Bus: Bx28, Bx38
- Structure: Open-cut / at-grade
- Platforms: 2 side platforms
- Tracks: 3 (2 in regular service; 1 not in regular service; 1 removed)

Other information
- Opened: May 29, 1912; 114 years ago (NYW&B station); May 15, 1941; 85 years ago (re-opened as a subway station)
- Closed: December 12, 1937; 88 years ago (NYW&B station)
- Accessible: Yes
- Former/other names: Gunhill Road

Traffic
- 2025: 845,218 ▲1.7%
- Rank: 336 out of 423
Services
Preceding station	New York City Subway	Following station
Baychester Avenue toward Eastchester–Dyre Avenue	Local	Pelham Parkway toward Flatbush Avenue–Brooklyn College
Former services
Preceding station	New York, Westchester and Boston Railway	Following station
Baychester Avenue toward White Plains or Port Chester via Columbus Avenue	Main Line	Pelham Parkway toward Harlem River
Location
Location within New York City Subway
Location within New York City
Location within New York
Track layout
Street map
Station service legend
Symbol	Description
Stops all times	Stops all times
Stops weekdays and weekday late nights	Stops weekdays and weekday late nights
Stops weekends and weekend late nights	Stops weekends and weekend late nights

The Gun Hill Road station (referred to on strip maps as Gun Hill Road–Seymour Avenue) is a station on the IRT Dyre Avenue Line of the New York City Subway, located at the intersection of Gun Hill Road and Seymour Avenue in the northeast Bronx. It is served by the 5 train at all times. The station opened in 1912 for the New York, Westchester and Boston Railway (NYW&B). It closed in 1937 and reopened as part of the subway system in 1941. Elevators were added in 2021, making the station fully accessible under the Americans with Disabilities Act of 1990.

== History ==
=== Early history ===
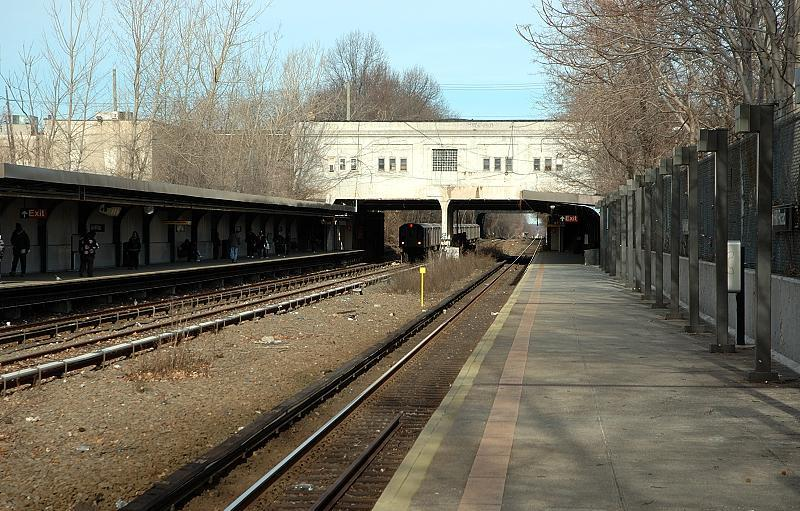
2006 photograph from the Dyre Avenue platform with a train beneath the station house approaching the East 180th Street-bound platform.

Gun Hill Road station opened on May 29, 1912 as a local station of the New York, Westchester and Boston Railway (NYW&B). This station was closed on December 12, 1937 when the NYW&B went bankrupt.

The New York City Board of Transportation (BOT) bought the NYW&B within the Bronx north of East 180th Street in April 1940 for $1.8 million and rehabilitated the line. On May 15, 1941, a shuttle service was implemented between Dyre Avenue and East 180th Street using IRT gate cars. The Dyre Avenue Line was connected directly to the White Plains Road Line north of East 180th Street for $3 million and through service began on May 6, 1957.

On February 27, 1962, the New York City Transit Authority announced a $700,000 modernization plan of the Dyre Avenue Line. The plan included the reconstruction of the Dyre Avenue station, and the extension of the platforms of the other four stations on the line, including Gun Hill Road, to 525 feet (160 m) to accommodate ten-car trains. At the time, the line was served by 9-car trains during the day, and 3-car shuttles overnight. Between 1954 and 1961, ridership on the line increased by 100 percent, owing to the development of the northeast Bronx.

On April 18, 1965, IRT Broadway–Seventh Avenue Line trains and IRT Lexington Avenue Line trains swapped their northern routings, with Broadway–Seventh Avenue 2 trains running via the IRT White Plains Road Line to 241st Street, and Lexington Avenue 5 trains running via the Dyre Avenue Line to Dyre Avenue.

=== Station renovation ===
As part of the 2015–2019 MTA Capital Program, elevators were added to the platforms and street, which makes the station fully compliant with accessibility guidelines under the Americans with Disabilities Act of 1990. A contract for the elevators' construction was awarded in April 2018. Substantial completion was projected for July 2020, but was pushed back to September 2020, and eventually past September 2020. In conjunction with this work, the Eastchester-bound platform was closed from March 1, 2019 to September 6, 2019, while the Manhattan-bound platform was closed from September 13, 2019 to March 30, 2020, a month later than expected. The elevators opened six months behind schedule in January 2021.

== Station layout ==
This station has two side platforms with three tracks and space for a fourth. The street (Gun Hill Road) is above the northern part of the station. The station, served by the 5 train at all times, is between Pelham Parkway to the south and Baychester Avenue to the north.

The entrance is at street level. At the north end of the station, it is in an open-cut due to the rising terrain. At the south end of the station, it is at-grade.

=== Exit ===
The station's only entrance/exit is a head house on the south side of Gun Hill Road between Sexton and Dewitt Places. The entrance and exit are separate from each other within the headhouse. One staircase and elevator leads down to the southbound platform, while two staircases and an elevator leads down to the northbound platform. There was once an exit that only allowed passengers to leave the station from the northbound platform, but during the station renovations that includes elevator installations to each platform, that exit has since been closed and the staircase was reconfigured to be connected to the mezzanine inside fare control. It is one of the only five stations (Eastchester–Dyre Avenue, Baychester Avenue, Gun Hill Road, Pelham Parkway and Morris Park) in the whole NYC subway that don't have at least a booth that is staffed 24 hours per day, 7 days per week.
