= Baychester Avenue station =

New York City Subway station in the Bronx

Baychester Avenue
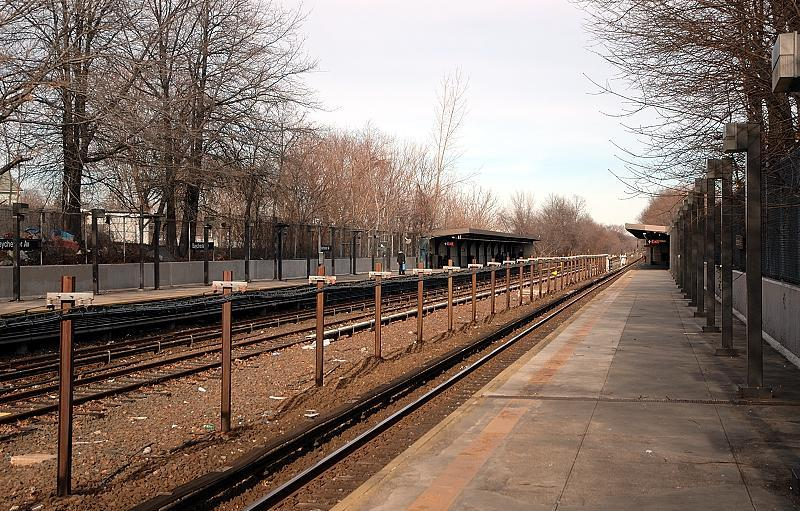
- June 2006 view of the platforms of Baychester Avenue station towards the canopies from the Dyre Avenue-bound platform

Station statistics
- Address: Baychester Avenue & Tillotson Avenue; Bronx, New York
- Borough: The Bronx
- Locale: Eastchester, Baychester
- Coordinates: 40.87864°N 73.838369°W
- Division: A (IRT, formerly NYW&B)
- Line: IRT Dyre Avenue Line
- Services: 5 (all times)
- Transit: NYCT Bus: Bx30; Bee-Line Bus: 60, 61, 62 (on Boston Road)
- Structure: Embankment
- Platforms: 2 side platforms
- Tracks: 3 (2 in regular service; 1 not in regular service; 1 removed)

Other information
- Opened: May 29, 1912; 114 years ago (NYW&B station); May 15, 1941; 85 years ago (re-opened as a Subway station)
- Closed: December 12, 1937; 88 years ago (NYW&B station)
- Accessible: No; planned

Traffic
- 2025: 545,919 ▲3.7%
- Rank: 388 out of 423
Services
Preceding station	New York City Subway	Following station
Eastchester–Dyre Avenue Terminus	Local	Gun Hill Road toward Flatbush Avenue–Brooklyn College
Former services
Preceding station	New York, Westchester and Boston Railway	Following station
Dyre Avenue toward White Plains or Port Chester via Columbus Avenue	Main Line	Gun Hill Road toward Harlem River
Location
Location within New York City Subway
Location within New York City
Location within New York
Track layout
Street map
Station service legend
Symbol	Description
Stops all times	Stops all times
Stops weekdays and weekday late nights	Stops weekdays and weekday late nights
Stops weekends and weekend late nights	Stops weekends and weekend late nights

The Baychester Avenue station is a station on the IRT Dyre Avenue Line of the New York City Subway, located at the intersection of Baychester and Tillotson Avenues in the Bronx. It is served by the 5 train at all times.

== History ==
Baychester Avenue opened on May 29, 1912 as a local station of the New York, Westchester and Boston Railway (NYW&B). This station was closed on December 12, 1937 when the NYW&B went bankrupt.

The New York City Board of Transportation (BOT) bought the NYW&B within the Bronx north of East 180th Street in April 1940 for $1.8 million and rehabilitated the line. On May 15, 1941, a shuttle service was implemented between Dyre Avenue and East 180th Street using IRT gate cars. The Dyre Avenue Line was connected directly to the White Plains Road Line north of East 180th Street for $3 million and through service began on May 6, 1957.

On February 27, 1962, the New York City Transit Authority announced a $700,000 modernization plan of the Dyre Avenue Line. The plan included the reconstruction of the Dyre Avenue station, and the extension of the platforms of the other four stations on the line, including Baychester Avenue to 525 feet (160 m) to accommodate ten-car trains. At the time, the line was served by 9-car trains during the day, and 3-car shuttles overnight. Between 1954 and 1961, ridership on the line increased by 100%, owing to the development of the northeast Bronx.

On April 18, 1965, IRT Broadway–Seventh Avenue Line trains and IRT Lexington Avenue Line trains swapped their northern routings, with Broadway–Seventh Avenue 2 trains running via the IRT White Plains Road Line to 241st Street, and Lexington Avenue 5 trains running via the Dyre Avenue Line to Dyre Avenue. The line is still operated as a shuttle late nights.

The northbound platform was closed between September 9, 1991 and June 15, 1992 so that it could be rehabilitated. The platform was supposed to reopen in May. As part of the project, the station received an improved electrical system, new lighting, reinforced concrete platforms, a new canopy, a new drainage system, new graphics on windscreens and new handrails. As part of its 2025–2029 Capital Program, the MTA has proposed making the station wheelchair-accessible in compliance with the Americans with Disabilities Act of 1990.

== Station layout ==
The station has two side platforms and three tracks with space for a fourth. It is on an embankment with a cut in the embankment for the street to run below (Baychester Avenue). The station, served by the 5 train at all times, is between Gun Hill Road to the south and Eastchester–Dyre Avenue to the north.

=== Exit ===
The station house is on street level below the platforms and tracks on their extreme north end. A staircase from each platform goes down to an underpass, where on the Dyre Avenue-bound side, a single exit-only turnstile leads to a set of doors to the streets. The main fare control area is on the Manhattan-bound side. It has a set of doors to the underpass, another to the platform stairs, a turnstile bank, token booth, and doors to the streets. It is one of the only five stations (Eastchester–Dyre Avenue, Baychester Avenue, Gun Hill Road, Pelham Parkway and Morris Park) in the whole NYC subway that don't have at least a booth that is staffed 24 hours per day, 7 days per week.
