= Morris Park station =

New York City Subway station in the Bronx

Morris Park
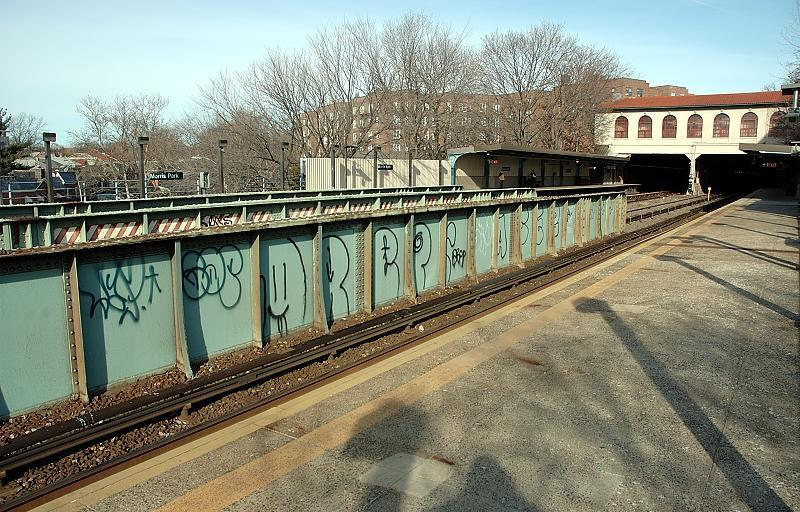
- View from the northbound platform

Station statistics
- Address: Paulding Avenue & Esplanade; Bronx, New York
- Borough: The Bronx
- Locale: Morris Park, Pelham Parkway
- Coordinates: 40.854429°N 73.860397°W
- Division: A (IRT, formerly NYW&B)
- Line: IRT Dyre Avenue Line
- Services: 5 (all times)
- Structure: Partially underground and partially on embankment
- Platforms: 2 side platforms
- Tracks: 4 (2 in regular service)

Other information
- Opened: May 29, 1912; 114 years ago (NYW&B station); May 15, 1941; 85 years ago (re-opened as a Subway station)
- Closed: December 12, 1937; 88 years ago (NYW&B station)

Traffic
- 2025: 552,828 ▲4.7%
- Rank: 385 out of 423
Services
Preceding station	New York City Subway	Following station
Pelham Parkway toward Eastchester–Dyre Avenue	Local	East 180th Street toward Flatbush Avenue–Brooklyn College
Former services
Preceding station	New York, Westchester and Boston Railway	Following station
Pelham Parkway toward White Plains or Port Chester via Columbus Avenue	Main Line	180th Street toward Harlem River
Location
Location within New York City Subway
Location within New York City
Location within New York
Track layout
Street map
Station service legend
Symbol	Description
Stops all times	Stops all times
Stops weekdays and weekday late nights	Stops weekdays and weekday late nights
Stops weekends and weekend late nights	Stops weekends and weekend late nights
- Morris Park Station
- U.S. National Register of Historic Places
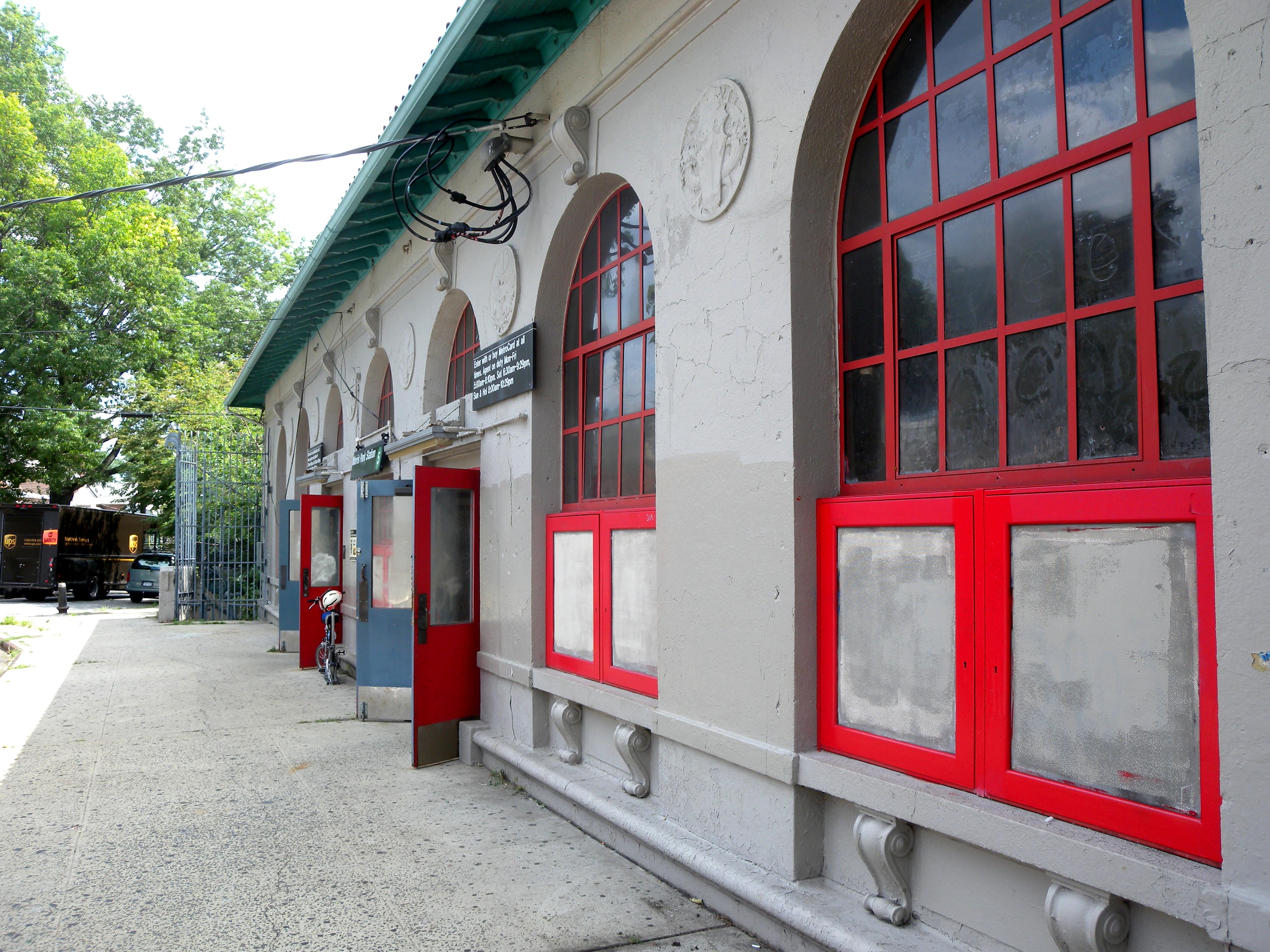

- Location within New York Location within the United States
- Location: Under Esplanade Ave. at Bogart and Colden Ave. and Hone Ave., Bronx, New York
- Coordinates: 40.854429°N 73.860397°W
- Area: less than one acre
- Built: 1912
- Architect: Reed and Stem; Fellheimer & Long
- Architectural style: Mission/Spanish Revival
- MPS: New York City Subway System MPS
- NRHP reference No.: 05000677
- Added to NRHP: July 6, 2005

The Morris Park station is a station on the IRT Dyre Avenue Line of the New York City Subway. Located at Paulding Avenue and the Esplanade in Morris Park, Bronx, it is served by the 5 train at all times.

== History ==
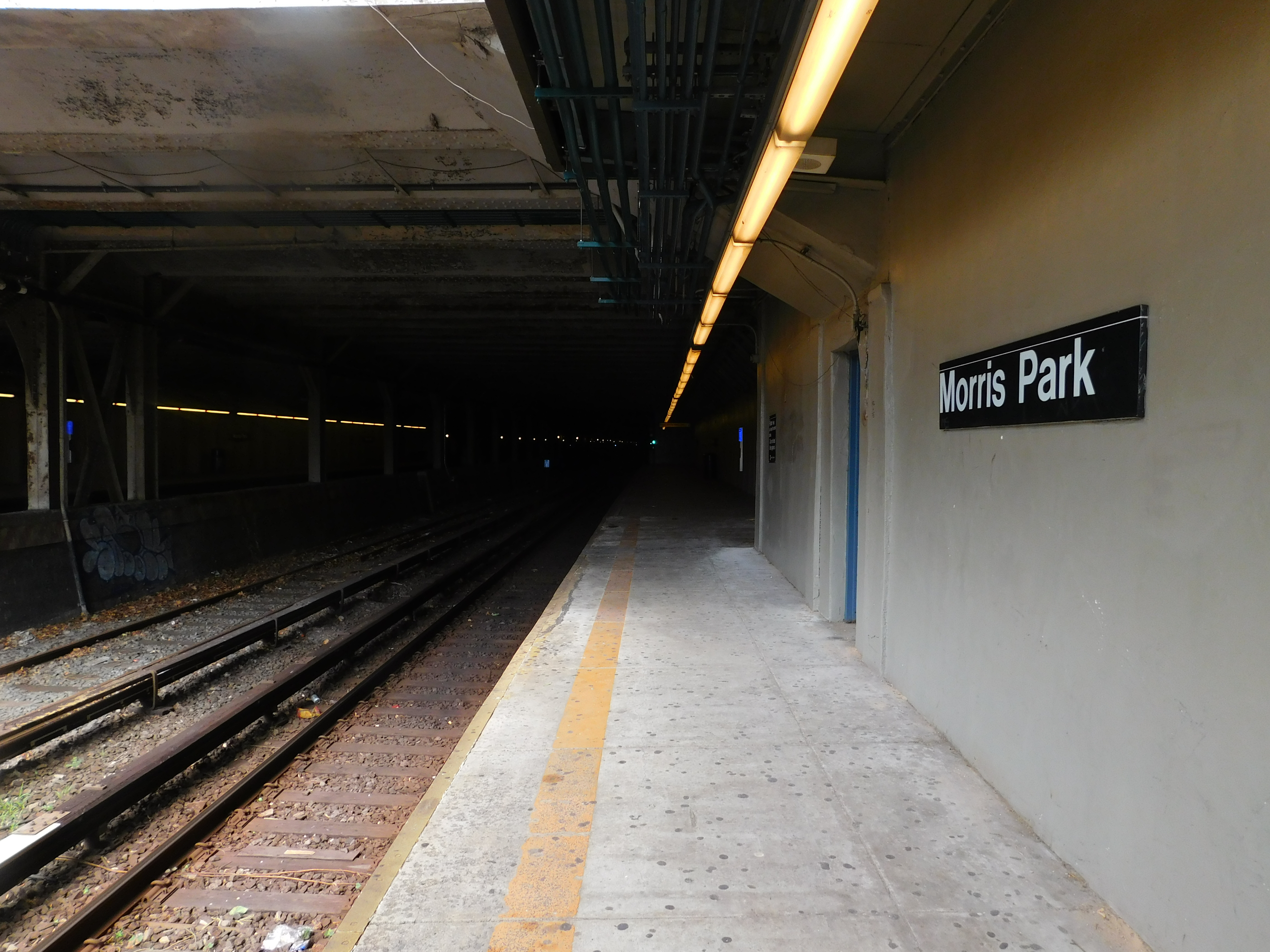
The underground portion of the station

=== New York, Westchester and Boston Railway ===
The station opened on May 29, 1912, as a local station of the New York, Westchester and Boston Railway (NYW&B), a subsidiary of the New York, New Haven and Hartford. The line was designed for the weight of the heaviest mainline steam trains. The NYW&B offered frequent service between 138th Street in the South Bronx and White Plains and Port Chester in Westchester County. The White Plains and Port Chester branches diverged at Mount Vernon Junction near Columbus Avenue along the boundary between Mount Vernon and Pelham.

The two outer tracks at Morris Park were for trains that made local stops in the Bronx, and went to Port Chester. The two inner tracks were for express trains that made limited stops in the Bronx, and went to White Plains. The trains were powered by 11,000 Volt 25 Hz alternating current supplied from an overhead catenary. The cut-off stumps of the catenary bridges remain along the right of way and can be seen from the south ends of the platforms.

Service ended on December 12, 1937, following the bankruptcy of the NYW&B.

=== New York City Transit ===
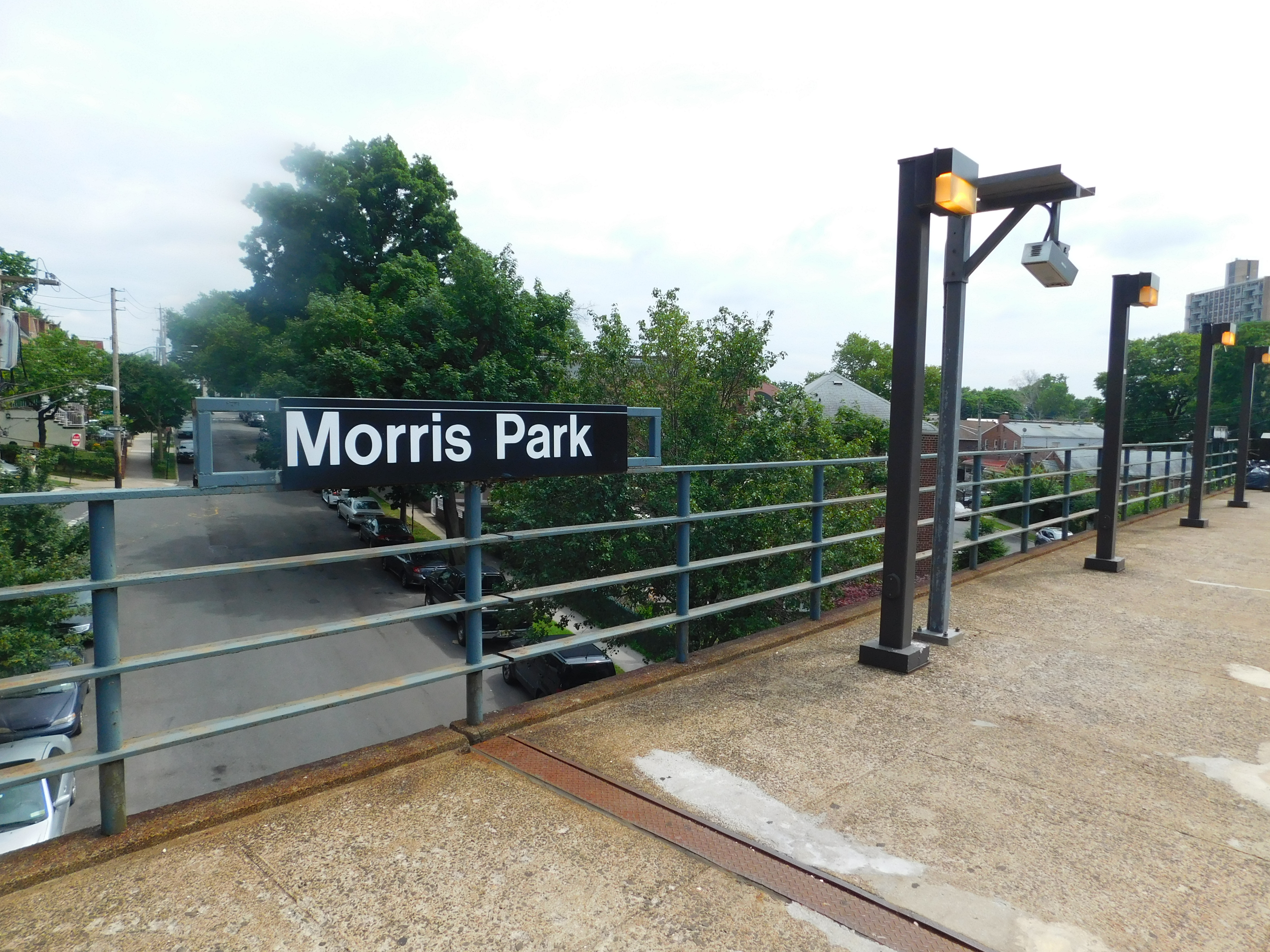
A portion of the station on an embankment

The New York City Board of Transportation (BOT) bought the NYW&B within the Bronx north of East 180th Street in April 1940 for $1.8 million and rehabilitated the line. On May 15, 1941, a shuttle service was implemented between Dyre Avenue and East 180th Street using IRT gate cars. The Dyre Avenue Line was connected directly to the White Plains Road Line north of East 180th Street for $3 million with a flying junction and through service began on May 6, 1957.

Between 1954 and 1961, ridership on the line increased by 100 percent, owing to the development of the northeast Bronx. On February 27, 1962, the New York City Transit Authority announced a $700,000 modernization plan of the Dyre Avenue Line. The plan included the reconstruction of the Dyre Avenue station, and the extension of the platforms of the other four stations on the line, including Morris Park, to 525 feet (160 m) to accommodate ten-car trains. At the time, the line was served by 9-car trains during the day, and 3-car shuttles overnight.

The platforms at Morris Park were extended towards the south, requiring a reduction in the height of the outboard plate girders of the bridge over Colden Avenue so that the bottoms of the platforms would be above the tops of the girders. The massive overdesign of the bridge allowed ample margin for trimming the girders.

On November 24, 1979, an R22 car, #7602, was involved in a rear-ending accident here.

The Bronx-bound platform was closed for renovation from February 17, 1992, to August 31, 1992, earlier than its expected reopening in late fall 1992. As part of the project, the station received new benches, fluorescent lighting, an upgraded electrical system and stairway from the station building to Paulding Avenue. The station renovation was to be fully completed in November with repairs to the station building, including a new ceiling, a new clay tile roof, and new windows and doors.

From the 1990s until the early 2000s the platform walls had a red and blue skyline design, before being painted beige. In the late 1990s, the original concrete exterior walls alongside the station platforms and the original roof that was supported on concrete columns and massive cantilevered timbers were replaced with steel bents supporting a clad metal wall system and a corrugated metal roof deck.

The station was listed on the National Register of Historic Places on July 6, 2005.

== Station layout ==
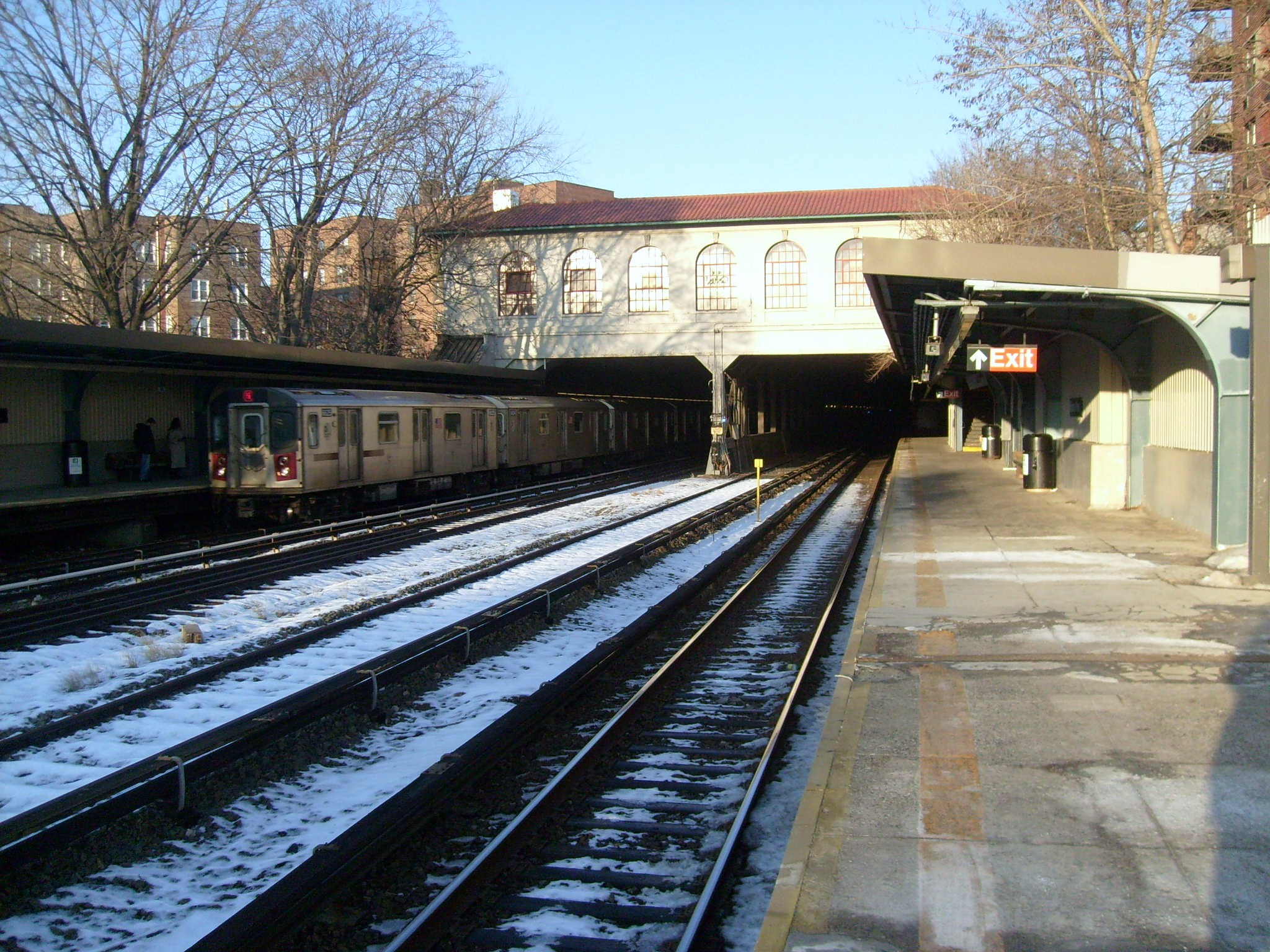
Tunnel portal at north end

The station has two side platforms with four tracks (two center express tracks formerly used by the New York, Westchester and Boston Railway) and is partially underground and partially on an embankment. The underground portion is at the south end of a 4,000-foot (1,200 m) long, four-track tunnel under the Bronx and Pelham Parkway. This tunnel includes a four-track underground station, the Pelham Parkway station, about 0.5 miles (0.80 km) north of the Morris Park station. The heavy construction and high clearances greatly exceed the size and weight requirements of IRT subway cars. The station, served by the 5 train at all times, is between East 180th Street to the south and Pelham Parkway to the north.

The emblem of the NYW&B, was the caduceus, a staff entwined with serpents that has served as a symbol of commerce since Classical times. It is cast into several locations of the concrete facade facing the Esplanade.

=== Exit ===
The station's only entrance/exit is a head house at the southwest corner of Esplanade and Paulding Avenue. The head house is notable for its graceful Spanish Mission style architecture and robust reinforced concrete construction. The handsome exterior, with its tall arched windows and tiled roof, has been restored to good condition. It was designed by Alfred T. Fellheimer, who was the lead architect for Grand Central Terminal. It is one of the only five stations (Eastchester–Dyre Avenue, Baychester Avenue, Gun Hill Road, Pelham Parkway and Morris Park) in the whole NYC subway that don't have at least a booth that is staffed 24 hours per day, 7 days per week.

There was formerly an exit under the tracks with a waiting room that led to the north side of Colden Avenue near Lydig Avenue. It is now bricked over.
