= Pelham Parkway station (IRT Dyre Avenue Line) =

New York City Subway station in the Bronx

Pelham Parkway
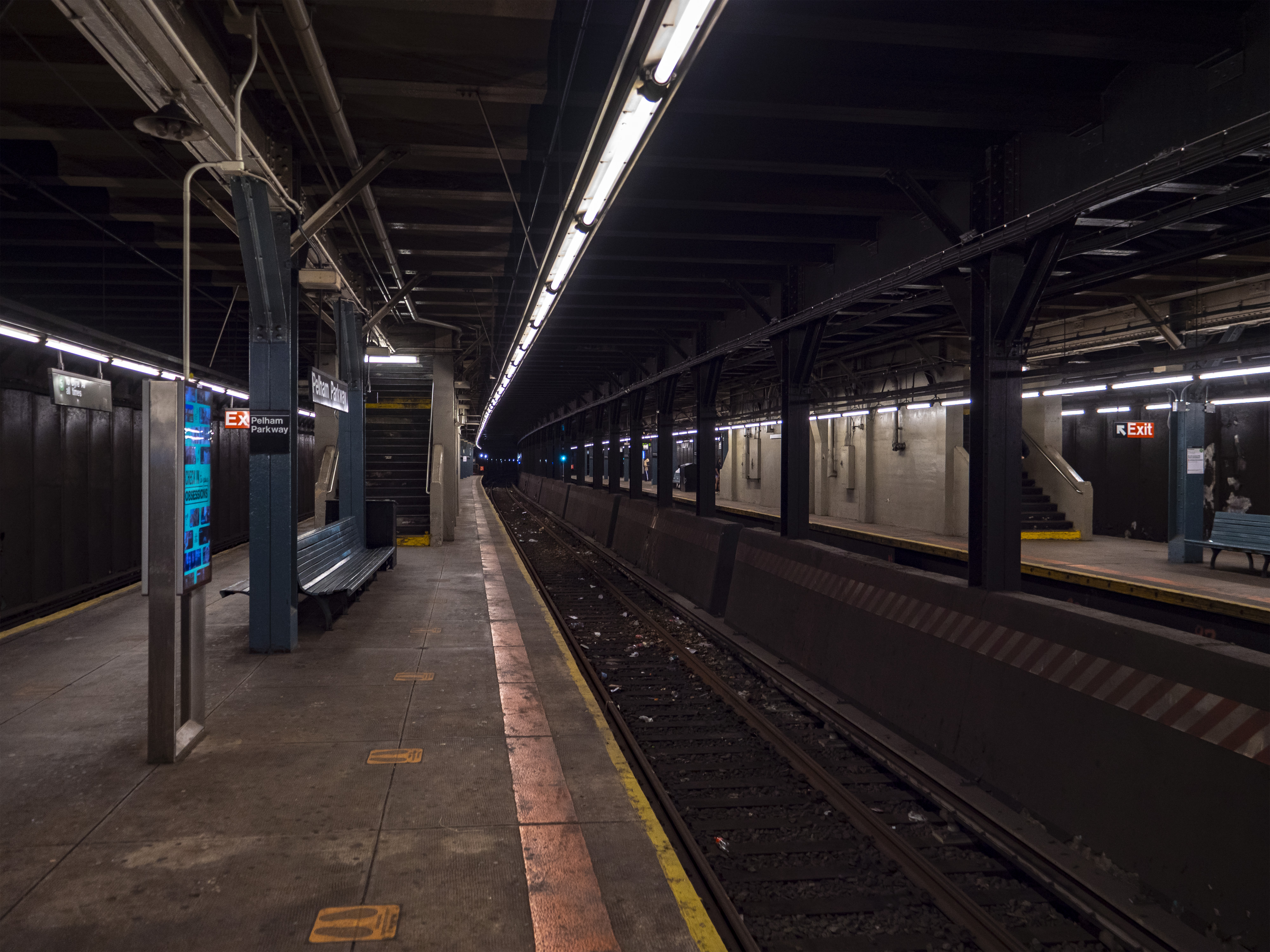
- View from southbound platform

Station statistics
- Address: Pelham Parkway, Williamsbridge Road & Esplanade; Bronx, New York
- Borough: The Bronx
- Locale: Pelham Gardens, Pelham Parkway, Allerton
- Coordinates: 40.85813°N 73.856063°W
- Division: A (IRT, formerly NYW&B)
- Line: IRT Dyre Avenue Line
- Services: 5 (all times)
- Transit: NYCT Bus: Bx8, Bx12, Bx12 SBS
- Structure: Underground
- Platforms: 2 island platforms
- Tracks: 4 (2 in regular service)

Other information
- Opened: May 29, 1912; 114 years ago (NYW&B station); May 15, 1941; 85 years ago (re-opened as a Subway station)
- Closed: December 31, 1937; 88 years ago (NYW&B station)

Traffic
- 2025: 605,144 ▲5.8%
- Rank: 369 out of 423
Services
Preceding station	New York City Subway	Following station
Gun Hill Road toward Eastchester–Dyre Avenue	Local	Morris Park toward Flatbush Avenue–Brooklyn College
Non-revenue services and lines
Preceding station	New York City Subway	Following station
Eastchester–Dyre Avenue express	no service	East 180th Street express
Former services
Preceding station	New York, Westchester and Boston Railway	Following station
Gun Hill Road toward White Plains or Port Chester via Columbus Avenue	Main Line	Morris Park toward Harlem River
Location
Location within New York City Subway
Location within New York City
Location within New York
Track layout
Street map
Station service legend
Symbol	Description
Stops all times	Stops all times
Stops weekdays and weekday late nights	Stops weekdays and weekday late nights
Stops weekends and weekend late nights	Stops weekends and weekend late nights

The Pelham Parkway station (referred to on strip maps as Pelham Parkway–Esplanade) is a station on the IRT Dyre Avenue Line of the New York City Subway. Located at the intersection of Pelham Parkway North and the Esplanade (erroneously signed as "Esplanade Avenue" in the station) in the Bronx, it is served by the 5 train at all times. Departing passengers are asked to watch the gap upon leaving the train at this station.

This station was built as part of the New York, Westchester and Boston Railway (NYW&B), and opened in 1912. This station closed in 1937 with the NYW&B, but reopened in 1941 as a subway station after the portion of the line in the Bronx was purchased by New York City.

== History ==
=== Early history ===
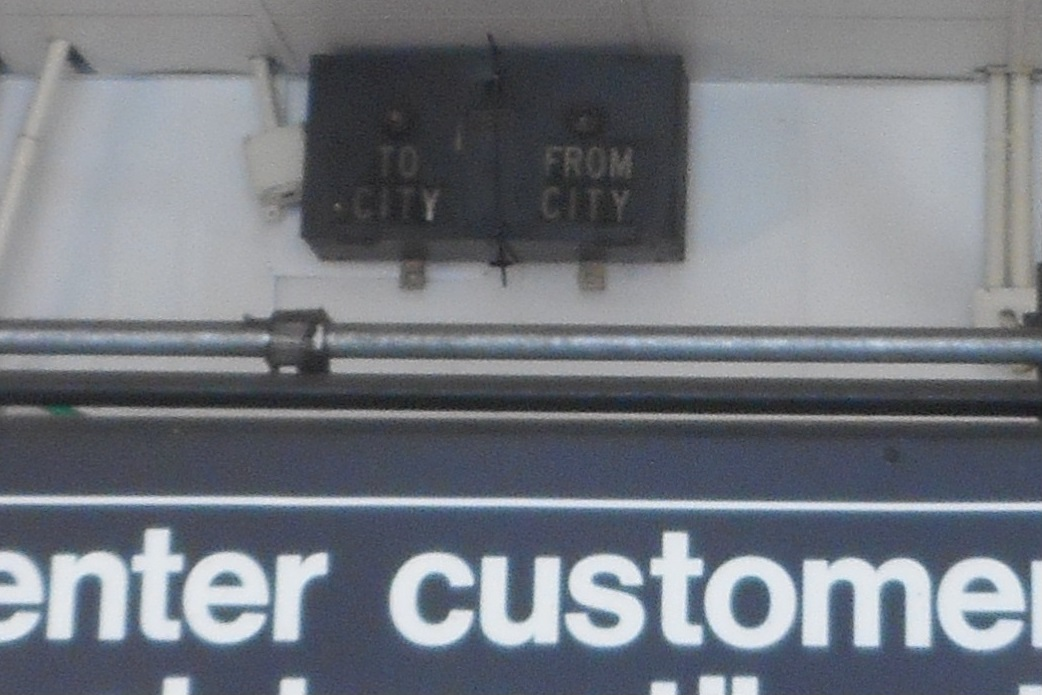
Old "To City"/"From City" train indicators from the New York, Westchester and Boston Railway

Pelham Parkway station opened on May 29, 1912 as an express station of the New York, Westchester and Boston Railway (NYW&B). This station was closed on December 12, 1937 when the NYW&B went bankrupt.

The New York City Board of Transportation (BOT) bought the NYW&B within the Bronx north of East 180th Street in April 1940 for $1.8 million and rehabilitated the line. On May 15, 1941, a shuttle service was implemented between Dyre Avenue and East 180th Street using IRT gate cars. The Dyre Avenue Line was connected directly to the White Plains Road Line north of East 180th Street for $3 million and through service began on May 6, 1957.

On February 27, 1962, the New York City Transit Authority announced a $700,000 modernization plan of the Dyre Avenue Line. The plan included the reconstruction of the Dyre Avenue station, and the extension of the platforms of the other four stations on the line, including Pelham Parkway, to 525 feet (160 m) to accommodate ten-car trains. At the time, the line was served by 9-car trains during the day, and 3-car shuttles overnight. Between 1954 and 1961, ridership on the line increased by 100 percent, owing to the development of the northeast Bronx.

On April 18, 1965, IRT Broadway–Seventh Avenue Line trains and IRT Lexington Avenue Line trains swapped their northern routings, with Broadway–Seventh Avenue 2 trains running via the IRT White Plains Road Line to 241st Street, and Lexington Avenue 5 trains running via the Dyre Avenue Line to Dyre Avenue.

=== Later years ===
In 1981, the Metropolitan Transportation Authority (MTA) listed the station among the 69 most deteriorated stations in the subway system. Under the 2015–2019 MTA Capital Program, this station, along with thirty other New York City Subway stations, was slated to undergo a complete overhaul and would be entirely closed for up to six months. Updates would have included cellular service, Wi-Fi, charging stations, improved signage, and improved station lighting. However, these renovations were deferred until the 2020–2024 Capital Program due to a lack of funding.

== Station layout ==
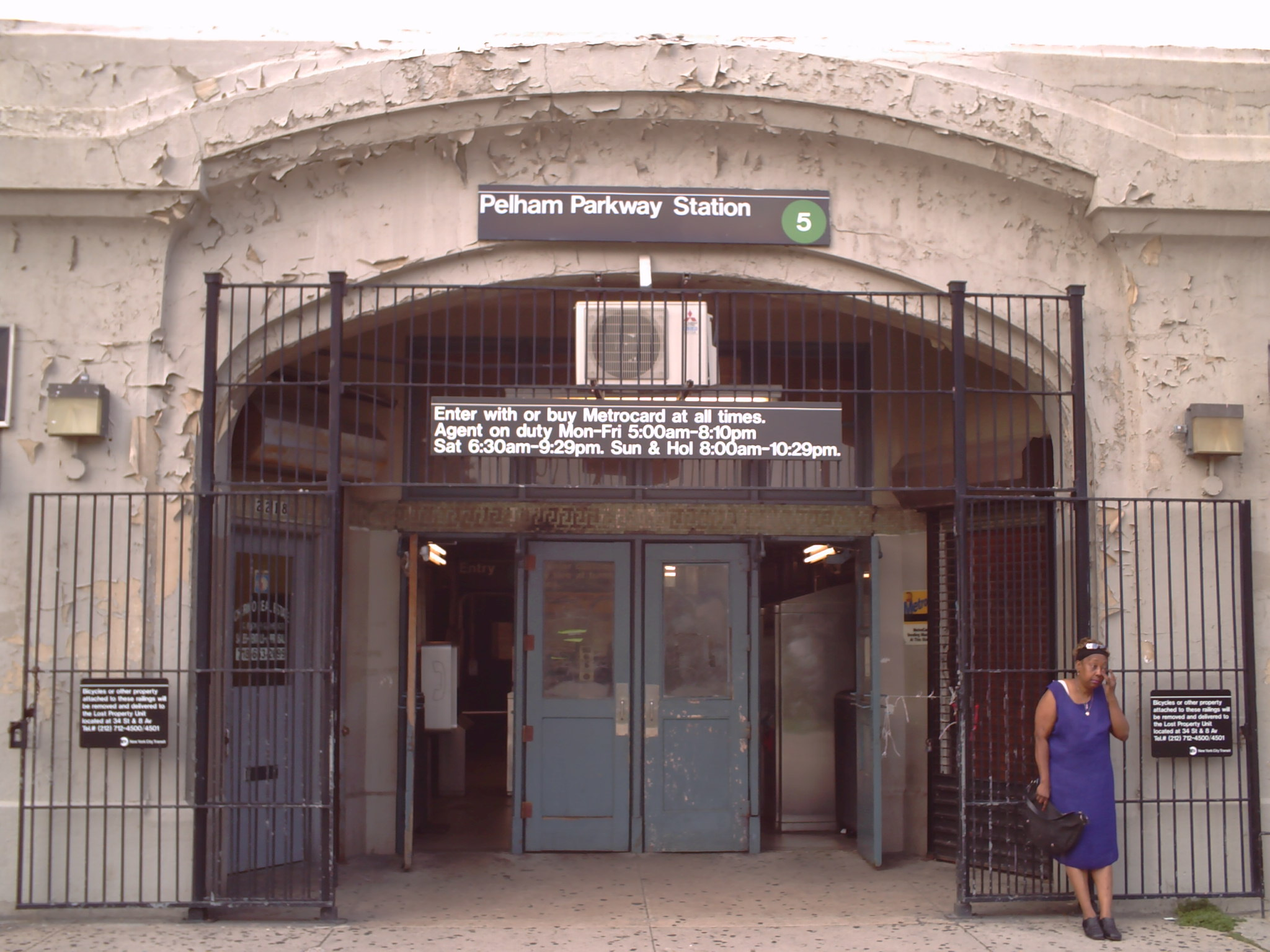
2008 view of the station house entrance

This station was originally an express station of the New York, Westchester and Boston Railway, with two island platforms and four tracks. The station, served by the 5 train at all times, is between Morris Park to the south and Gun Hill Road to the north. An original NYW&B-era train indicator can still be found inside the station.

Today, the two local tracks remain in revenue service, and the southbound express track remains in use as a test track. The northbound express track ends about halfway between the north end of the station and the northern tunnel portal, however, it used to end at a bumper block just south of the station. The station is designed with two island platforms; however it is not considered an express station. The northbound express track had been restored at this station in October 2014. The purpose of the restoration was to serve work trains for the Dyre Avenue Line signal modernization project. As of 2017 the express tracks are also being used to develop a pilot program for platform screen doors technology.

Pelham Parkway is the only completely underground station on the Dyre Avenue Line and the only underground station in the system not originally built for subway use. It is also the northernmost underground IRT station, and the only four-track underground station in the Bronx.

=== Exit ===
The station's only entrance and exit is a head house in the median of the Esplanade north of Pelham Parkway North. It is one of the only five stations (Eastchester–Dyre Avenue, Baychester Avenue, Gun Hill Road, Pelham Parkway and Morris Park) in the whole NYC subway that don't have at least a booth that is staffed 24 hours per day, 7 days per week.
