= Pelham Gardens, Bronx =

Neighborhood in New York City

Pelham Gardens
- Neighborhood of the Bronx
- Location in New York City
- Coordinates: 40.861°N 73.845°W
- Country: United States
- State: New York
- City: New York City
- Borough: The Bronx
- Community District: Bronx 11

Area
  - Total: 0.757 sq mi (1.96 km^{2})

Population (2011)
  - Total: 15,388
  - Density: 20,300/sq mi (7,850/km^{2})

Economics
  - Median income: $68,552
- ZIP Codes: 10469
- Area code: 718, 347, 929, and 917
- Website: www.pelhamgardens.nyc

Pelham Gardens is a neighborhood located in the northeast section of the Bronx, New York City. Its boundaries, starting from the north and moving clockwise are East Gun Hill Road to the north and east, Pelham Parkway to the south, and the IRT Dyre Avenue Line (5 train) to the west ending at the esplanade. Eastchester Road is the primary thoroughfare through Pelham Gardens.

Pelham Gardens is located in Bronx Community Board 11, and its ZIP Code is 10469. The area is patrolled by the New York City Police Department's 49th Precinct.

== History ==
The area was originally home to the Siwanoy, a Native American tribe affiliated with the Algonquian peoples. The name Pelham Gardens derives from Thomas Pell, who purchased the land from the Siwanoy on June 27, 1654, at Treaty Oak, located next to Shore Road in what is now Pelham Bay Park. The town of Westchester was established at this time at what is now Westchester Square; the entire area was part of Westchester County, New York until it was transferred to the city of New York City in 1895. The oldest house in the area is what was once a farmhouse, located at the corner of Woodhull Avenue and Fielding Street.

The neighborhood is socioeconomically diverse, with a considerable working class population as well as many upper middle class professionals, particularly in the eastern area of the community. The proximity to major hospitals and a high concentration of private medical facilities has drawn many health care professionals into the areas, as well as police officers, lawyers, and small business owners, particularly in the fields of construction and food services.

== Land use and terrain ==
Pelham Gardens is dominated by single family homes with some small apartment buildings and 2-3 family homes. Many private homes have basement studio apartments but are classified as one family. The total land area is roughly two square miles. The area its largely flat but contains a significant valley between Eastchester Road and Laconia Avenue, with the most significant low point on Seymour Avenue. This dip was likely caused thousands of years ago by a glacier.

== Demographics ==
Based on data from the 2010 United States census, the population of the combined Allerton-Pelham Gardens neighborhood was 28,903, an increase of 393 (1.4%) from the 28,510 counted in 2000. Covering an area of 726.98 acres (294.20 ha), the neighborhood had a population density of 39.8 inhabitants per acre (25,500/sq mi; 9,800/km^{2}). The racial makeup of the Allerton-Pelham Gardens neighborhood was 25.3% (7,316) White, 32.5% (9,391) African American, 0.2% (55) Native American, 7.9% (2,282) Asian, 0.0% (12) Pacific Islander, 0.9% (252) from other races, and 1.4% (412) from two or more races. Hispanic or Latino of any race were 31.8% (9,183) of the population.

Demographically, the neighborhood has historically been home to a large Italian-American population as well as a sizable Jewish population, which has dramatically decreased since the 1970s. Smaller numbers of Irish-Americans and German-Americans have also made this largely Catholic community home since significant development began in the 1920s, with a construction boom in the 1950s. Large numbers of Puerto Rican families have moved into the area since the 1980s, with smaller but significant numbers of Filipino-Americans, African-Americans, Dominican-Americans, Albanian-Americans, Korean Americans, and Vietnamese Americans.

The entirety of Community District 11, which comprises Pelham Gardens, Allerton, and Morris Park, had 116,180 inhabitants as of NYC Health's 2018 Community Health Profile, with an average life expectancy of 79.9 years. This is lower than the median life expectancy of 81.2 for all New York City neighborhoods. Most inhabitants are youth and middle-aged adults: 22% are between the ages of between 0–17, 30% between 25 and 44, and 24% between 45 and 64. The ratio of college-aged and elderly residents was lower, at 9% and 14% respectively.

As of 2017, the median household income in Community District 11 was $48,018. In 2018, an estimated 21% of Pelham Gardens and Morris Park residents lived in poverty, compared to 25% in all of the Bronx and 20% in all of New York City. One in eight residents (12%) were unemployed, compared to 13% in the Bronx and 9% in New York City. Rent burden, or the percentage of residents who have difficulty paying their rent, is 55% in Pelham Gardens and Morris Park, compared to the boroughwide and citywide rates of 58% and 51% respectively. Based on this calculation, as of 2018, Pelham Gardens and Morris Park are considered high-income relative to the rest of the city and not gentrifying.

== Police and crime ==
Pelham Gardens and Morris Park are patrolled by the 49th Precinct of the NYPD, located at 2121 Eastchester Road. The 49th Precinct ranked 43rd safest out of 69 patrol areas for per-capita crime in 2010. As of 2018, with a non-fatal assault rate of 64 per 100,000 people, Pelham Gardens and Morris Park's rate of violent crimes per capita is slightly more than that of the city as a whole. The incarceration rate of 372 per 100,000 people is lower than that of the city as a whole.

The 49th Precinct has a lower crime rate than in the 1990s, with crimes across all categories having decreased by 71.7% between 1990 and 2022. The precinct reported 7 murders, 17 rapes, 273 robberies, 367 felony assaults, 133 burglaries, 611 grand larcenies, and 371 grand larcenies auto in 2022.

== Fire safety ==
Pelham Gardens is served by the New York City Fire Department (FDNY)'s Engine Co. 97 at 1454 Astor Avenue.

== Health ==
As of 2018, preterm births and births to teenage mothers are slightly more common in Pelham Gardens and Morris Park than in other places citywide. In Pelham Gardens and Morris Park, there were 90 preterm births per 1,000 live births (compared to 87 per 1,000 citywide), and 19.7 births to teenage mothers per 1,000 live births (compared to 19.3 per 1,000 citywide). Pelham Gardens and Morris Park has a low population of residents who are uninsured. In 2018, this population of uninsured residents was estimated to be 12%, the same as the citywide rate of 12%.

The concentration of fine particulate matter, the deadliest type of air pollutant, in Pelham Gardens and Morris Park is 0.0074 milligrams per cubic metre (7.4×10^{−9} oz/ft^{3}), less than the city average. Fifteen percent of Pelham Gardens and Morris Park residents are smokers, which is slightly higher than the city average of 14% of residents being smokers. In Pelham Gardens and Morris Park, 32% of residents are obese, 14% are diabetic, and 31% have high blood pressure—compared to the citywide averages of 24%, 11%, and 28% respectively. In addition, 23% of children are obese, compared to the citywide average of 20%.

Eighty-three percent of residents eat some fruits and vegetables every day, which is lower than the city's average of 87%. In 2018, 80% of residents described their health as "good", "very good", or "excellent", slightly higher than the city's average of 78%. For every supermarket in Pelham Gardens and Morris Park, there are 17 bodegas.

The nearest large hospitals are Calvary Hospital, Montefiore Medical Center's Jack D. Weiler Hospital, and NYC Health + Hospitals/Jacobi in Morris Park. The Albert Einstein College of Medicine campus is also located in Morris Park.

== Post office and ZIP Code ==
Pelham Gardens is located within ZIP Code 10469 east of Bronxwood Avenue. The United States Postal Service operates the Baychester Station at 1525 East Gun Hill Road.

== Education ==
Pelham Gardens and Morris Park generally have a lower rate of college-educated residents than the rest of the city as of 2018. While 32% of residents age 25 and older have a college education or higher, 24% have less than a high school education and 44% are high school graduates or have some college education. By contrast, 26% of Bronx residents and 43% of city residents have a college education or higher. The percentage of Pelham Gardens and Morris Park students excelling in math rose from 32% in 2000 to 48% in 2011, though reading achievement remained constant at 37% during the same time period.

Pelham Gardens and Morris Park's rate of elementary school student absenteeism is slightly higher than the rest of New York City. In Pelham Gardens and Morris Park, 23% of elementary school students missed twenty or more days per school year, a little more than the citywide average of 20%. Additionally, 74% of high school students in Pelham Gardens and Morris Park graduate on time, about the same as the citywide average of 75%.

=== Library ===
The New York Public Library (NYPL) operates the Eastchester branch at 1385 East Gun Hill Road. It has operated since 1950 and moved to its current one-story, 7,500-square-foot (700 m^{2}) location in 1985.

== Transportation ==
The following MTA Regional Bus Operations bus routes serve Pelham Gardens:

- Bx12 Local and Select Bus Service: to Bay Plaza Shopping Center and Inwood–207th Street (A train) (via Fordham Road and Pelham Parkway)
- Bx25 and Bx26: to Co-op City and Lehman College (via Bedford Park Blvd and Allerton Av)
- Bx28 and Bx38: to Co-op City and Fordham (via East Gun Hill Road)
- Bx31: to Woodlawn and Westchester Square station (via Eastchester Road)
- BxM10: to East Side, Manhattan

The following New York City Subway stations serve Pelham Gardens:

- Pelham Parkway (5 train)
- Gun Hill Road (5 train)

== Notable residents ==
- Lorraine Cortés-Vázquez, Commissioner of the New York City Department of Aging, former New York Secretary of State
- Philip Foglia (c.1951–2020), prosecutor, lawyer, and Italian American rights activist
- Jake Lamotta, boxer (lived on Pelham Parkway)
- Lea Michele, actress, known for Glee (lived on Tiemann Avenue)
