= Pelham Parkway (neighborhood), Bronx =

Neighborhood in New York City

Pelham Parkway
- Neighborhood of the Bronx
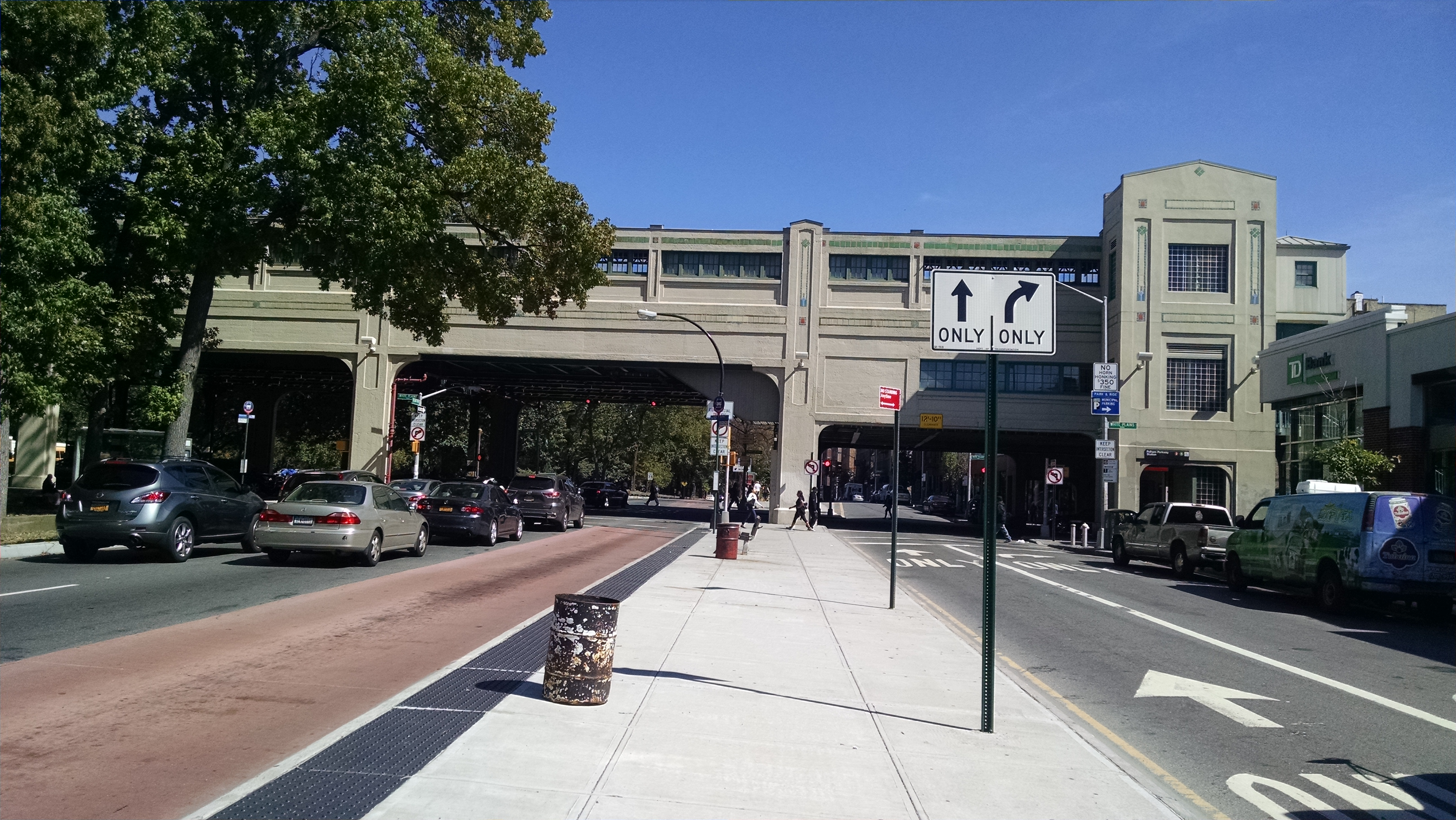
- White Plains Road and Pelham Parkway South
- Location in New York City
- Coordinates: 40.858°N 73.856°W
- Country: United States
- State: New York
- City: New York City
- Borough: Bronx
- Community District: Bronx 11

Area
  - Total: 0.754 sq mi (1.95 km^{2})

Population (2010)
  - Total: 30,073
  - Density: 39,900/sq mi (15,400/km^{2})

Economics
  - Median income: $58,860

Ethnicity
  - Hispanic: 39.4%
  - Black: 10.7%
  - White: 36.2%
  - Asian: 11.3%
  - Others: 2.4%
- ZIP Codes: 10461, 10462
- Area code: 718, 347, 929, and 917
- Website: www.pelhamparkway.nyc

Pelham Parkway is a working- and middle-class residential neighborhood geographically located in the center of the Bronx, a borough of New York City in the United States. Its boundaries, starting from the north and moving clockwise are: Pelham Parkway South, to the east the IRT Dyre Avenue Line tracks (5 train) and to the south Bronxdale Avenue and to the west, Bronx Park East. White Plains Road is the primary commercial thoroughfare through Pelham Parkway. The neighborhood is named after Pelham Parkway, a major west–east parkway that travels through the East Bronx.

Pelham Parkway is part of Bronx Community District 11 and its primary ZIP Codes are 10461 and 10462. It is patrolled by the New York City Police Department's 49th Precinct.

== History ==
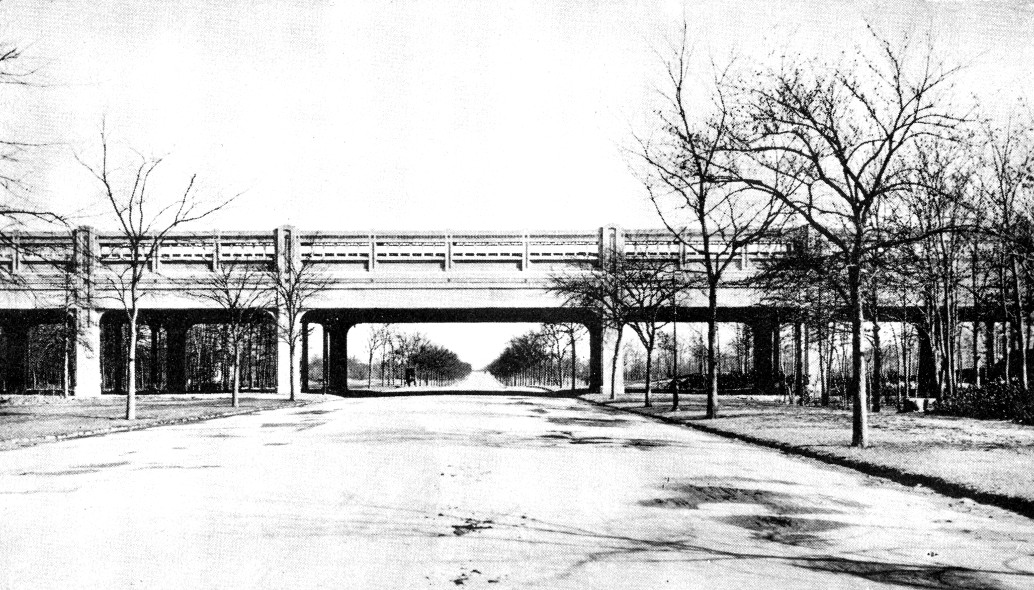
Historical photo of the IRT White Plains Road Line at Pelham Parkway

The road named Pelham Parkway was officially called the Bronx and Pelham Parkway since it connects Bronx Park and Pelham Bay Park. It is also an integral part of the Mosholu-Pelham Greenway. The road was established in 1911 and was originally only one lane, which is today's westbound lane. The parkway was one part of John Mullaly's vision of creating a vast system of six parks along with connecting parkway roads to link them.

The parkway was lined with trees on both sides and had a strict building code. Nobody was allowed to build within 150 feet (46 m) of the center. No railroads were allowed to cross over the parkway; this is why the roadbed of the New York, Westchester and Boston Railway, which is now the Dyre Avenue subway line, had to be laid in a tunnel underneath the parkway. Bars and hotels are also prohibited alongside the parkway. Land in 1900 cost between $3,500 and $5,000 for one lot; near Bronx Park the prices were even higher. The neighborhood was named after the Parkway.

After a late 20th-century deterioration of the neighborhood, coinciding with what was known as white flight from the Bronx, the Pelham Parkway neighborhood showed signs of revitalization in the new century. Many apartments have been rehabilitated and offered as rentals to the growing middle income population found in the area. A number of buildings have been converted to cooperative ownership and the business section on White Plains Road and Lydig Avenue is a beehive of activity. Their stores reflect the neighborhood's polyglot lineage with many ethnic restaurants side by side with Kosher and Italian butchers and bakeries.

Today's parkway was constructed in the 1930s and is 2.3 miles (3.7 km) in length and 400 feet (120 m) wide and features wide expanses of lawn with full canopies of trees. The center of the parkway, prior to World War II, was closed off on Sunday mornings for professional bicycle racing. Today, a recreational bikeway runs alongside the westbound motor lanes of the parkway, near the north side of the Parkway.

== Demographics ==
Based on data from the 2010 United States census, the population of Pelham Parkway was 30,073, an increase of 67 (0.2%) from the 30,006 counted in 2000. Covering an area of 531.08 acres (214.92 ha), the neighborhood had a population density of 56.6 inhabitants per acre (36,200/sq mi; 14,000/km^{2}). The racial makeup of the neighborhood was 36.2% (10,875) White, 10.7% (3,223) African American, 0.2% (59) Native American, 11.3% (3,389) Asian, 0.0% (4) Pacific Islander, 0.7% (196) from other races, and 1.5% (466) from two or more races. Hispanic or Latino of any race were 39.4% (11,861) of the population.

The neighborhood has a significantly diverse population including Albanians (the largest concentration in New York City), Arabs, African Americans, Bosnians, Dominicans, Filipino, Germans, Guyanese, Indians, Irish, Italians, Jamaicans, Jews, Muslims, Pakistanis, Puerto Ricans, and Russians. Hispanics of various races account for 45% of the community; 38% of the community are non-Hispanic White and 20% non-Hispanic Black. Like most neighborhoods in New York City, the vast majority of households are renter occupied. However, there is a large community of co-op owners in the area. There is significant income diversity on a block by block basis, spanning from low wage immigrant households to solid upper middle class. While the poverty rate for The Bronx as a whole is 28%, the poverty rate in the neighborhood, at less than 20%, is much closer to the overall New York City rate of 15%.

The entirety of Community District 11, which comprises Pelham Parkway, Allerton, and Morris Park, had 116,180 inhabitants as of NYC Health's 2018 Community Health Profile, with an average life expectancy of 79.9 years. This is lower than the median life expectancy of 81.2 for all New York City neighborhoods. Most inhabitants are youth and middle-aged adults: 22% are between the ages of between 0–17, 30% between 25 and 44, and 24% between 45 and 64. The ratio of college-aged and elderly residents was lower, at 9% and 14% respectively.

As of 2017, the median household income in Community District 11 was $48,018. In 2018, an estimated 21% of Pelham Parkway and Morris Park residents lived in poverty, compared to 25% in all of the Bronx and 20% in all of New York City. One in eight residents (12%) were unemployed, compared to 13% in the Bronx and 9% in New York City. Rent burden, or the percentage of residents who have difficulty paying their rent, is 55% in Pelham Parkway and Morris Park, compared to the boroughwide and citywide rates of 58% and 51% respectively. Based on this calculation, as of 2018, Pelham Parkway and Morris Park are considered high-income relative to the rest of the city and not gentrifying.

== Land use and terrain ==
Pelham Parkway is dominated by 6 and 7-story elevator apartment and coop buildings but the residential streets are lined with a vibrant blend of housing types including detached houses and larger Art Deco and Tudor Style apartment buildings. In the last decade, construction of modern 2 and 3 unit row-houses and apartment buildings have increased the percentage of owners versus renters. The total land area is roughly one square mile. The terrain is relatively low laying and flat.

The neighborhood has long served as home to working and middle class New York families. The six-story apartment houses in which they reside stand in large numbers throughout the metropolitan area. This prevalence of the speculative six-story elevator apartment building has left this type of construction with little recognition. Though many of these dwellings stand alone or in large concentrations, a survey of similar communities indicates that the area is one of the neighborhoods of this typology, offering a compact stretch of these buildings. These structures contain facilities to meet residents' commercial, religious, and educational needs.

Bronx House, a settlement house, moved to Pelham Parkway in the 1950s. It is run by the Federation of Jewish Philanthropies as a community center and provides social services, support networks, English Language classes, free lunches for the elderly, and a gym for all neighborhood residents.

Bronx Park is located on 718 acres (291 ha) along the Bronx River, much of which contains the New York Botanical Garden and the Bronx Zoo. The remainder of the park is operated by the New York City Department of Parks and Recreation and is bounded by Southern Boulevard, Webster Avenue, Burke Avenue, Bronx Park East, and East 180th Street.

== Police and crime ==
Pelham Parkway and Morris Park are patrolled by the 49th Precinct of the NYPD, located at 2121 Eastchester Road. The 49th Precinct ranked 43rd safest out of 69 patrol areas for per-capita crime in 2010. As of 2018, with a non-fatal assault rate of 64 per 100,000 people, Pelham Parkway and Morris Park's rate of violent crimes per capita is slightly more than that of the city as a whole. The incarceration rate of 372 per 100,000 people is lower than that of the city as a whole.

The 49th Precinct has a lower crime rate than in the 1990s, with crimes across all categories having decreased by 71.7% between 1990 and 2022. The precinct reported 7 murders, 17 rapes, 273 robberies, 367 felony assaults, 133 burglaries, 611 grand larcenies, and 371 grand larcenies auto in 2022.

== Fire safety ==
Pelham Parkway is served by the New York City Fire Department (FDNY)'s Engine Co. 90/Ladder Co. 41 fire station at 1843 White Plains Road.

== Health ==
As of 2018, preterm births and births to teenage mothers are slightly more common in Pelham Parkway and Morris Park than in other places citywide. In Pelham Parkway and Morris Park, there were 90 preterm births per 1,000 live births (compared to 87 per 1,000 citywide), and 19.7 births to teenage mothers per 1,000 live births (compared to 19.3 per 1,000 citywide). Pelham Parkway and Morris Park has a low population of residents who are uninsured. In 2018, this population of uninsured residents was estimated to be 12%, the same as the citywide rate of 12%.

The concentration of fine particulate matter, the deadliest type of air pollutant, in Pelham Parkway and Morris Park is 0.0074 milligrams per cubic metre (7.4×10^{−9} oz/ft^{3}), less than the city average. Fifteen percent of Pelham Parkway and Morris Park residents are smokers, which is slightly higher than the city average of 14% of residents being smokers. In Pelham Parkway and Morris Park, 32% of residents are obese, 14% are diabetic, and 31% have high blood pressure—compared to the citywide averages of 24%, 11%, and 28% respectively. In addition, 23% of children are obese, compared to the citywide average of 20%.

Eighty-three percent of residents eat some fruits and vegetables every day, which is lower than the city's average of 87%. In 2018, 80% of residents described their health as "good", "very good", or "excellent", slightly higher than the city's average of 78%. For every supermarket in Pelham Parkway and Morris Park, there are 17 bodegas.

The nearest large hospitals are Calvary Hospital, Montefiore Medical Center's Jack D. Weiler Hospital, and NYC Health + Hospitals/Jacobi in Morris Park. The Albert Einstein College of Medicine campus is also located in Morris Park.

== Post offices and ZIP Codes ==
Pelham Parkway is located within four ZIP Codes. South of the road named Pelham Parkway, the eponymous neighborhood is located in 10462 west of Paulding Avenue and 10461 east of Paulding Avenue. North of the road named Pelham Parkway, the neighborhood is located in 10467 west of Bronxwood Avenue and 10469 east of Bronxwood Avenue. The United States Postal Service operates two post offices nearby: Parkway Station at 2100 White Plains Road and Esplanade Station at 2488 Williamsbridge Road.

== Education ==
Pelham Parkway and Morris Park generally have a lower rate of college-educated residents than the rest of the city as of 2018. While 32% of residents age 25 and older have a college education or higher, 24% have less than a high school education and 44% are high school graduates or have some college education. By contrast, 26% of Bronx residents and 43% of city residents have a college education or higher. The percentage of Pelham Parkway and Morris Park students excelling in math rose from 32% in 2000 to 48% in 2011, though reading achievement remained constant at 37% during the same time period.

Pelham Parkway and Morris Park's rate of elementary school student absenteeism is slightly higher than the rest of New York City. In Pelham Parkway and Morris Park, 23% of elementary school students missed twenty or more days per school year, a little more than the citywide average of 20%. Additionally, 74% of high school students in Pelham Parkway and Morris Park graduate on time, about the same as the citywide average of 75%.

=== Schools ===
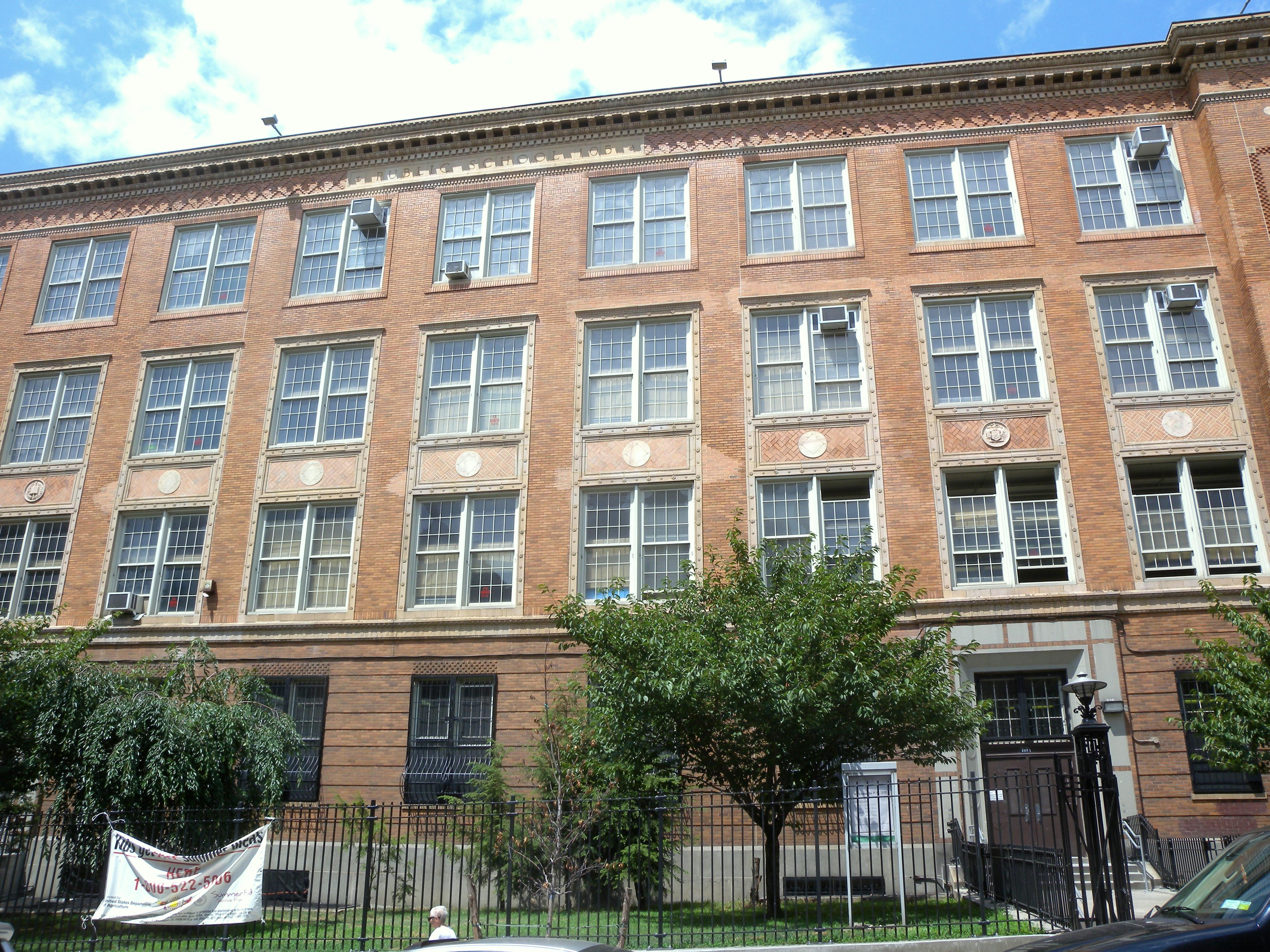
PS 105 on Brady Avenue

Christopher Columbus High School is in the neighborhood, on the north side of Pelham Parkway, in 2014 it permanently closed. CUNY Prep High School is in the southwest part of the neighborhood. The Albert Einstein College of Medicine is also nearby.

=== Library ===
The New York Public Library (NYPL)'s Pelham Parkway-Van Nest branch is located at 2147 Barnes Avenue. The branch opened in 1912 as one of NYPL's "Travelling Libraries", and between 1917 and 1968, moved to a series of permanent locations. The current building, which opened in 1968, has been known as the Van Nest or Van Nest Pelham branch through its history.

== Transportation ==
The neighborhood is served by several New York City Subway stations, as well as local bus route and an express bus to midtown Manhattan. The Pelham Parkway and Bronx Park East stations on the IRT White Plains Road Line (served by the 2 and 5 trains) and Morris Park on the IRT Dyre Avenue Line (served by the 5 train) service the area.

The following MTA Regional Bus Operations and Bee-Line bus routes serve Pelham Parkway:

- Bx8: to 225th Street station or Locust Point (via Williamsbridge Road)
- Bx12: to Bay Plaza Shopping Center or University Heights (via Fordham Road – Pelham Parkway)
- Bx12 SBS: to Bay Plaza Shopping Center or Inwood–207th Street station (via Fordham Road – Pelham Parkway)
- Bx22: to Bronx High School of Science or Castle Hill (via Fordham Road/Castle Hill Avenue)
- Bx30: to Co-op City (via Boston Road)
- Bx39: to Wakefield or Clason Point (via White Plains Road)
- BL60: to Fordham, Bronx or White Plains, NY (via US Route 1)
- BL61: to Fordham, Bronx or Port Chester, NY (via US Route 1)
- BL62: to Fordham, Bronx or White Plains, NY (via US Route 1; Express from New Rochelle to East White Plains)

Two Bronx-Manhattan express buses, the BxM10 (Morris Park Avenue route) and BxM11 (White Plains Road route), provide service to Midtown Manhattan along Fifth Avenue and returns to Pelham Parkway along Madison Avenue.

== Notable residents ==
- Robert Abrams (born 1938), former attorney general of New York; lived along Holland Avenue "on the same block as P.S. 105"
- Ronnie Landfield (born 1947), abstract artist; grew up on Wallace Avenue between Lydig Avenue and Pelham Parkway South.
- Andrea Mitchell (born 1946), television journalist, anchor, and commentator for NBC News; grew up in Pelham Parkway.
- Regis Philbin (1931–2020), talk show host who grew up on Cruger Avenue between Sagamore Street and Bronxdale Avenue, which has been co-named Regis Philbin Avenue.
- Frederic Tuten (born 1936), novelist, short story writer, essayist; grew up in Pelham Parkway North.
