= East 180th Street station =

New York City Subway station in the Bronx

East 180 Street
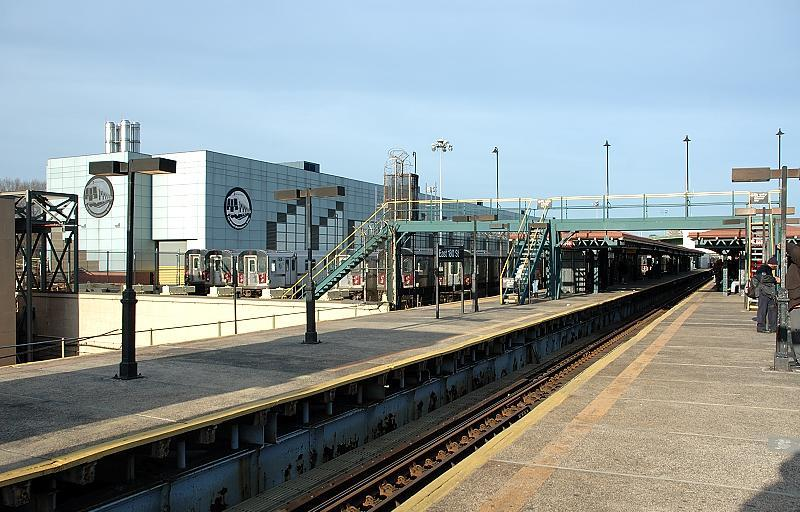
- Northbound view of the station platforms before renovation, with East 180th Street Yard off to the left

Station statistics
- Address: 481 Morris Park Avenue (at East 180th Street); Bronx, New York
- Borough: The Bronx
- Locale: Van Nest and West Farms
- Coordinates: 40.841°N 73.874°W
- Division: A (IRT)
- Line: IRT White Plains Road Line
- Services: 2 (all times); 5 (all times)
- Transit: NYCT Bus: Bx21, Bx40, Bx42; MTA Bus: BxM10
- Structure: Elevated
- Platforms: 2 island platforms cross-platform interchange
- Tracks: 3

Other information
- Opened: March 3, 1917; 109 years ago
- Accessible: Yes
- Former/other names: East 180th Street–Morris Park Avenue

Traffic
- 2025: 1,811,541 ▲6.9%
- Rank: 197 out of 423
Services
Preceding station	New York City Subway	Following station
Bronx Park East 2 5 toward Wakefield–241st Street	Local	West Farms Square–East Tremont Avenue 2 5 toward Flatbush Avenue–Brooklyn College
Morris Park 5 toward Eastchester–Dyre Avenue	5 (New York City Subway service)	West Farms Square–East Tremont Avenue 2 5 toward Flatbush Avenue–Brooklyn College
Morris Park 5 toward Eastchester–Dyre Avenue	5 (New York City Subway service)	Third Avenue–149th Street 5 express
Non-revenue services and lines
Preceding station	New York City Subway	Following station
Gun Hill Road White Plains express	no service	
Pelham Parkway Dyre express	no service	
Former services
Preceding station	New York, Westchester and Boston Railway	Following station
Morris Park toward White Plains or Port Chester via Columbus Avenue	Main Line	Westchester Avenue toward Harlem River
Location
Location within New York City Subway
Location within New York City
Location within New York
Track layout
Street map
Station service legend
Symbol	Description
Stops all times	Stops all times
Stops rush hours in the peak direction only	Stops rush hours in the peak direction only
Stops all times except rush hours in the peak direction	Stops all times except rush hours in the peak direction
Stops late nights only	Stops late nights only
Stops weekdays and weekday late nights	Stops weekdays and weekday late nights
Stops weekends and weekend late nights	Stops weekends and weekend late nights
- New York, Westchester and Boston Railroad Administration Building
- U.S. National Register of Historic Places
- New York City Landmark
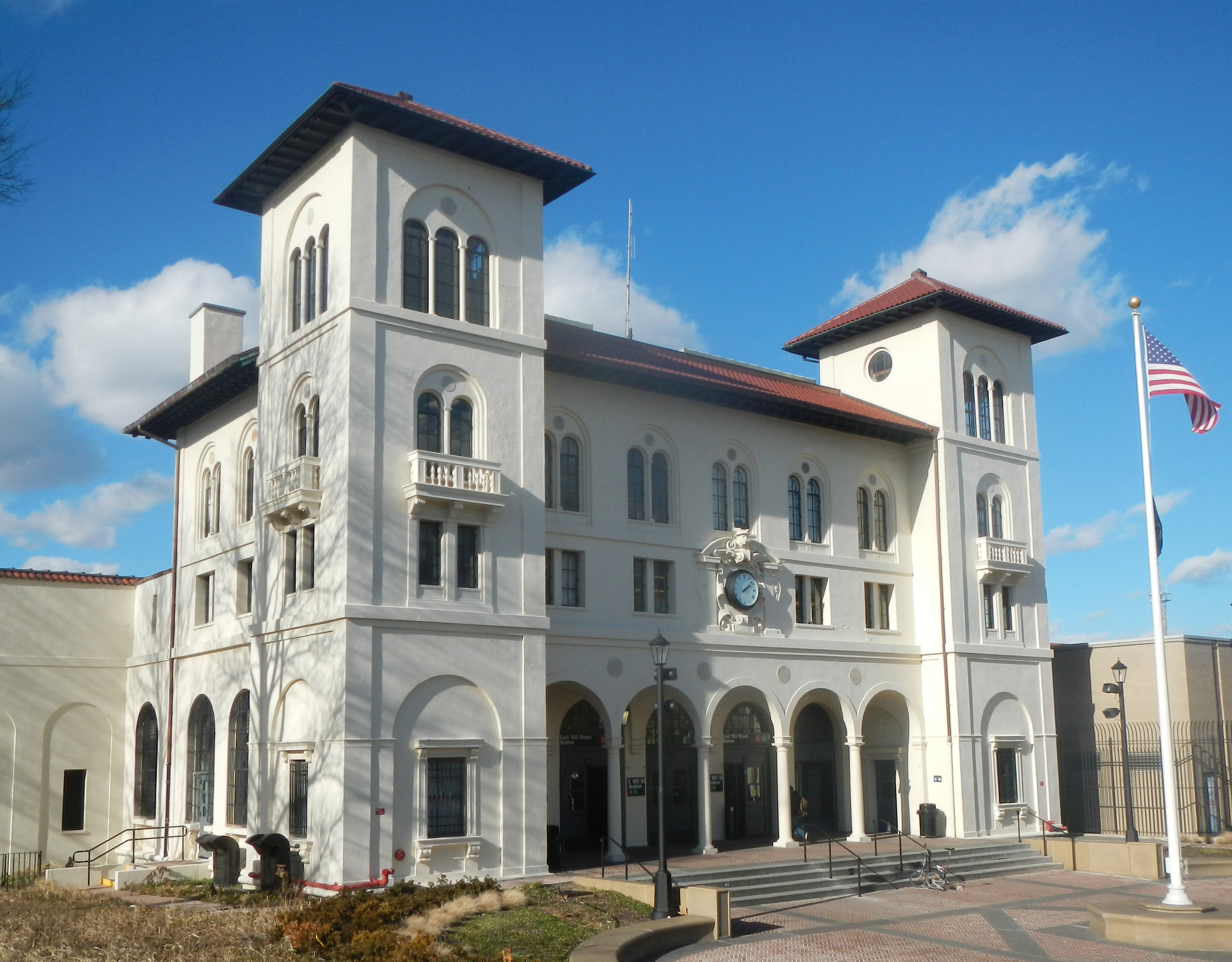
- The former NYW&B Administration building that serves as the entrance to the East 180th Street IRT White Plains Road Line station.
- Location: 481 Morris Park Avenue, Bronx, New York
- Coordinates: 40°50′29″N 73°52′23″W
- Area: less than one acre
- Built: 1912
- Architect: Fellheimer & Long; Stem, Allen H.
- Architectural style: Late 19th and 20th Century Revivals, Italian Renaissance
- NRHP reference No.: 80002587
- NYCL No.: 0839

Significant dates
- Added to NRHP: April 23, 1980
- Designated NYCL: May 11, 1976

The East 180th Street station (originally East 180th Street–Morris Park Avenue station) is an elevated express station on the IRT White Plains Road Line of the New York City Subway. Located at the intersection of East 180th Street and Morris Park Avenue in the West Farms and Van Nest neighborhoods of the Bronx, it is served by the 2 and 5 trains at all times. It is the southern terminal for late-night 5 trains.

The East 180th Street station was built by the Interborough Rapid Transit Company (IRT) under the Dual Contracts and opened in 1917 as part of an extension of the White Plains Road Line to East 219th Street–White Plains Road. The 180th Street station of the New York, Westchester and Boston Railway (NYW&B) is immediately adjacent to the IRT station. When the NYW&B went bankrupt in 1937, a portion of the main line was converted into the IRT Dyre Avenue Line, and the NYW&B platforms were abandoned after the Dyre Avenue Line was connected to the White Plains Road Line in 1957. The original NYW&B station house remains extant and is the station's main exit and entrance. There is also a New York City Police Department (NYPD) transit precinct at the station.

== History ==
=== Early history ===
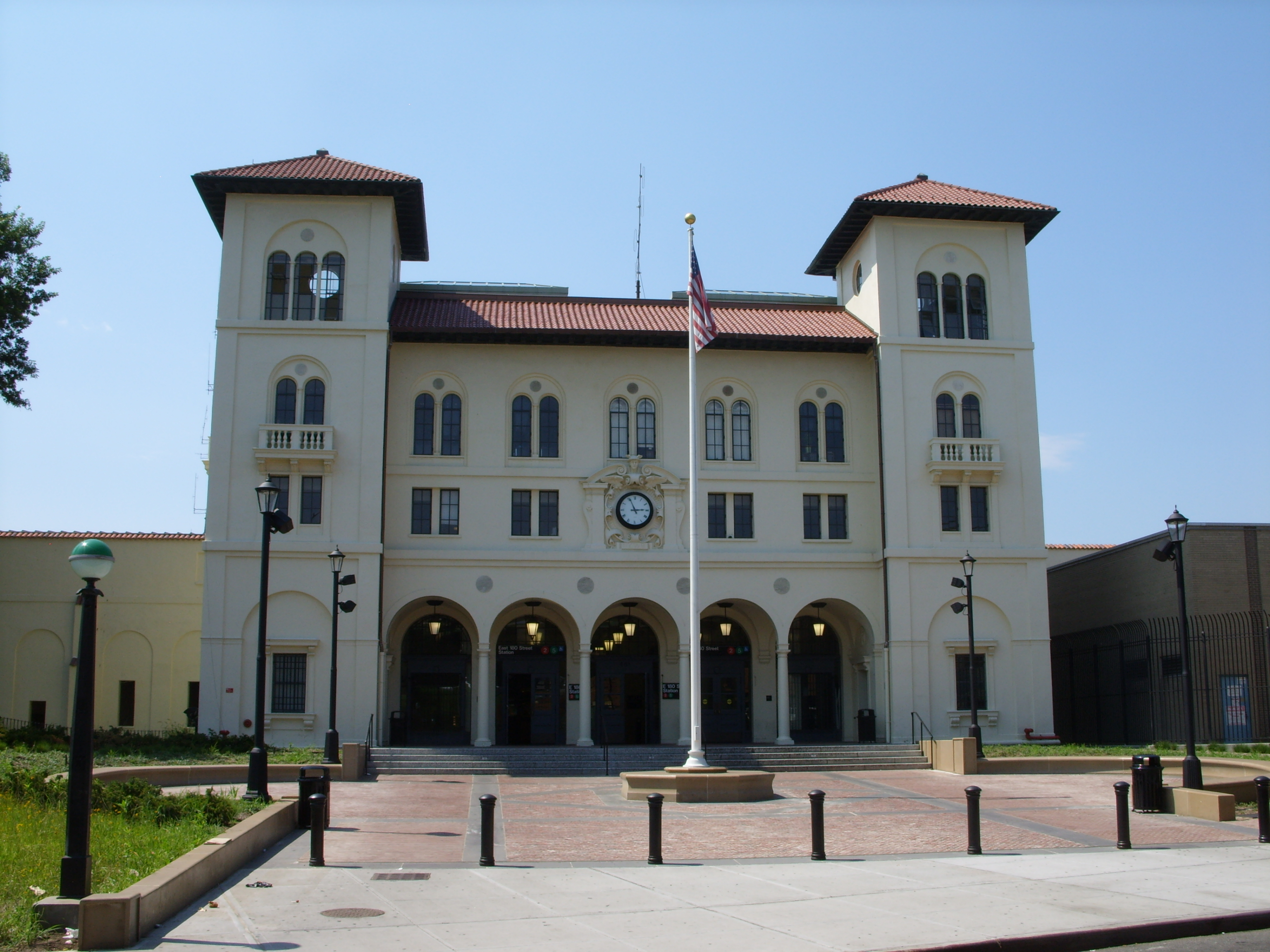
The main entrance, the New York, Westchester and Boston Railroad Administration Building

The New York, Westchester and Boston Railway (NYW&B), an electrified commuter line, opened on May 29, 1912, connecting White Plains and Port Chester, New York to a station at the Harlem River adjacent to the IRT Third Avenue Line. Soon a transfer station opened at East 180th Street, with transfers to the IRT White Plains Road Line and various surface lines. Express trains stopped within the Bronx only at Pelham Parkway and East 180th Street.

The Interborough Rapid Transit Company (IRT) built its East 180th Street station under the Dual Contracts. It opened on March 3, 1917, as part of an extension of the IRT White Plains Road Line from East 177th Street–East Tremont Avenue to East 219th Street–White Plains Road, providing the Bronx communities of Williamsbridge and Wakefield with access to rapid transit service. Service on the new portion of the line was operated as a four-car shuttle from 177th Street due to the power conditions at the time. The city government took over the IRT's operations on June 12, 1940.

=== Abandonment of NYW&B platform ===
The NYW&B was abandoned on December 31, 1937 due to bankruptcy. Two years later, city officials proposed to integrate the former NYW&B south of Dyre Avenue into the IRT system branching off the IRT Pelham Line. It was later decided to only utilize the line north of the East 180th Street station, even though the line continued to the Harlem River Terminal paralleling the New Haven Railroad (NHRR) right-of-way. The New York City Board of Transportation (BOT) bought the NYW&B within the Bronx north of East 180th Street in April 1940 for $1,800,000 and rehabilitated the line. The first train, an official train consisting of four cars with the Mayor and City officials, departed from East 180th Street on May 15, 1941. Trains on the line were shuttles, with a paper transfer to the IRT White Plains Road Line at East 180th Street.

The Dyre Avenue Line was connected directly to the White Plains Road Line north of East 180th Street for $3 million. The project was started in 1949 but was delayed because the necessary subway cars for the service were not available. The connection was originally supposed to open in 1950. Through service began on May 6, 1957, enabling through service by White Plains Road Line trains from Manhattan to Dyre Avenue. Trains from the Dyre Avenue Line ceased to use the former NYW&B platforms, instead using the IRT platforms. The NYW&B platforms had a track connection to the NHRR, which had been built in 1955 for equipment and material transfer and interchanges, including new car deliveries. The physical connection was severed by 1979. The NYW&B viaduct south of East 180th Street remained standing until 2003–2004, when the structure was demolished south of Lebanon Street.

=== Station house renovation ===
From March 2010 to 2013, the station underwent a rehabilitation designed by Lee Harris Pomeroy Architects in association with Weidlinger Associates, and completed by Citnalta Construction Corporation. Luisa Caldwell was commissioned to provide new artwork. Improvements included fixing up the entrance and forecourt; replacing parts of the canopy roof, track beds, platforms and platform edges; adding new elevator access to improve circulation; and repairing electrical, mechanical, plumbing, lighting and communication equipment. As part of the project, a "dank passageway between the administration building and the passenger platforms" was converted "into an inviting, light-filled corridor." Community groups hoped to see the return of businesses inside the station such as a barber shop, shoe repair, and dry cleaners which existed in the early 20th century.

The New York City Transit Authority paid $66.6 million for the station's renovation. The renovation also restored a clock beneath the figure of Mercury on the building's facade. The clock was not in the renovation budget, but the president of Citnalta did not like the facade's appearance without a clock. Citnalta located a 45-inch diameter clock with Roman numerals and covered its $8,000 price and labor to install it as an extra contribution to the renovation. The East 180th Street station rehabilitation was completed and closed out in May 2013 at a $49.5 million cost, with another $10.4 million included for ADA access. It had been delayed six months to resolve and complete punch work.

=== Later changes ===
The Metropolitan Transportation Authority announced in 2024 that it would replace the station's existing waist-high turnstiles with taller, wide-aisle turnstiles. The MTA announced in 2025 that a customer service center would open at the station.

== Station layout ==
=== New York City Subway platforms ===
The New York City Subway station has two island platforms and three tracks. All 2 trains, and 5 trains at all times except rush hours and late nights, stop at the outer tracks. The center track is used by 5 service during rush hours in the peak direction (when it runs express to or from Third Avenue–149th Street) and late nights (when shuttle trains from Eastchester–Dyre Avenue terminate here). The express run to Third Avenue–149th Street is 3.4 miles (5.5 km) long and bypasses seven stations, making it the second-longest express run in the system, after the 3.5-mile (5.6 km) express run between 125th Street and 59th Street–Columbus Circle on the IND Eighth Avenue Line, which also bypasses seven stations.

The south end of the platforms has a staff-only bridge allowing access from the platforms to the East 180th Street Yard directly to the west.

Heading north, after West Farms Square–East Tremont Avenue, trains turn east and enter the S-curve to East 180th Street. To the northeast are the Unionport Yard and a signal tower; just to the northwest is the flyover that carries the southbound track of the IRT Dyre Avenue Line. The 2 train continues on the IRT White Plains Road Line to Wakefield–241st Street, while the 5 train diverges to the Dyre Avenue Line northeast to Eastchester–Dyre Avenue. Some 5 trains continue on the White Plains Road Line during rush hours and run local to Nereid Avenue.

=== New York, Westchester and Boston Railway platforms ===
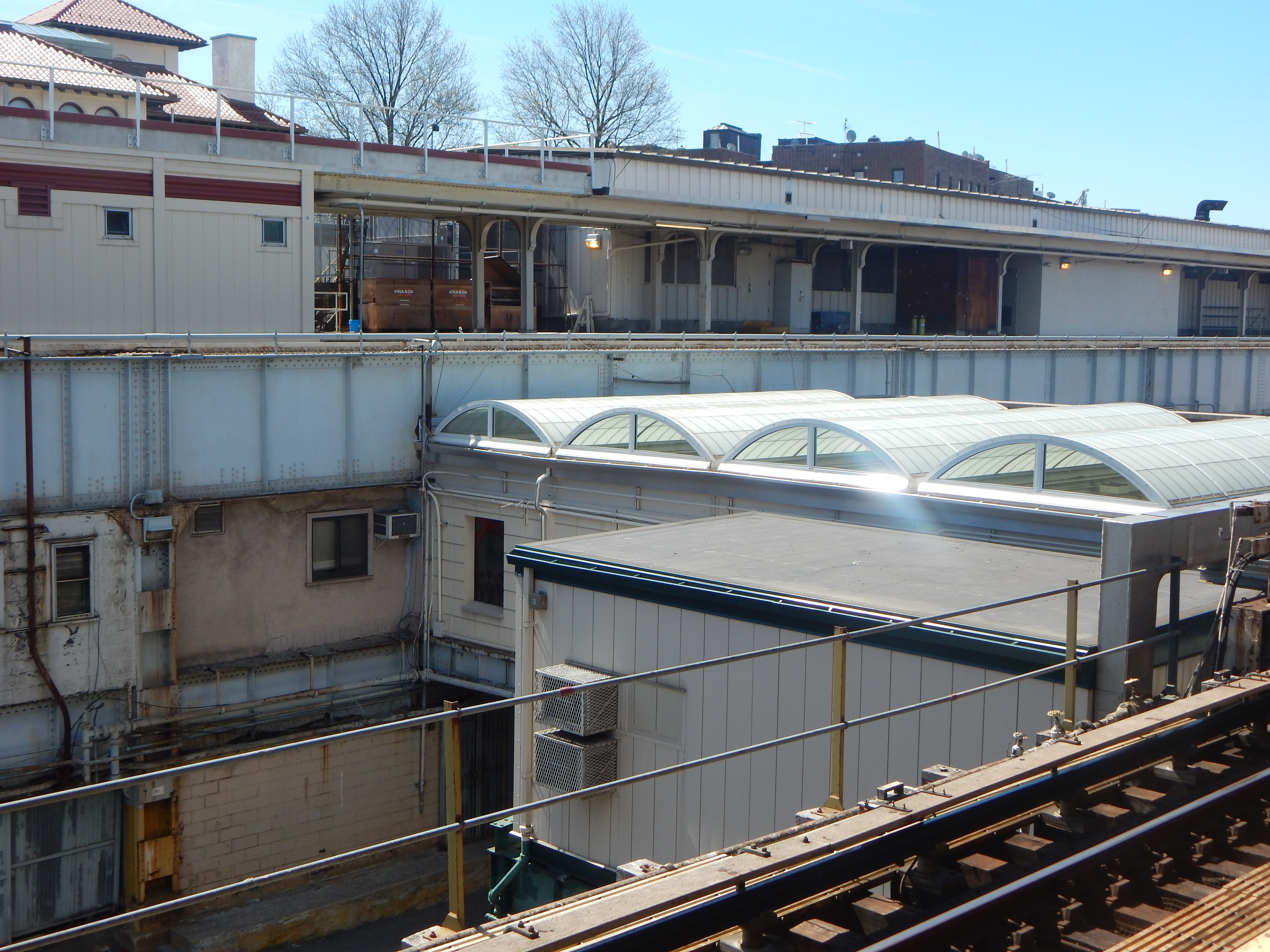
Disused platform of the New York, Westchester, and Boston Railway

Directly to the east of the platforms are the platforms of the old New York, Westchester and Boston Railway's 180th Street station. After the demise of NYW&B in 1937, a portion of the main line was bought by the city of New York, which converted it into the subway and renamed it the IRT Dyre Avenue Line. The line north of Dyre Avenue and south of East 180th Street was abandoned and demolished, leaving the Dyre Avenue Line with no rail connections, so subway service debuted in 1940 as a full-time shuttle.

In 1957, a flyover connection between the IRT White Plains Road and Dyre Avenue Lines opened, allowing trains from the latter to travel to Manhattan and Brooklyn. All services that formerly used the NYW&B tracks and platforms moved to the White Plains Road Line platforms and tracks.

== Exits ==
The fare control is in the old New York, Westchester and Boston Railway station house. A secondary exit leads to 180th Street. Until the 1980s, the station had escalators to the street level via a mezzanine, the remains of which are visible beneath the tracks.

=== Original station house ===
The original NYW&B station house on Morris Park Avenue is still in use as the main entrance. The station was designed by Fellheimer & Long with Allen H. Stem Associated Architects. The building is made of concrete and has a three-story central section flanked by four-story projecting end pavilions; in addition, it has a street level loggia.

It contains office space and a small and a large convenience store, a customer service station, and MTA police. It previously housed New York City Transit Police's Transit District #12, now located across the street at 460 Morris Park Avenue. The offices on the building's upper floors house employees in the New York Transit Authority's rapid transit operations, signals and structures divisions. Restoration of the station house was completed by the Metropolitan Transportation Authority in 2013. It was designated a New York City Landmark in 1976 and was listed on the National Register of Historic Places in 1980. It is the only free-standing National Register building that serves as the entrance to a subway station.
