= IRT Dyre Avenue Line =

New York City Subway line

- The 5 train serves the entire IRT Dyre Avenue Line at all times.

Overview
- Owner: City of New York
- Locale: The Bronx, New York City
- Termini: North of Eastchester–Dyre Avenue; Junction south of Morris Park
- Stations: 5

Service
- Type: Rapid transit
- System: New York City Subway
- Operator: New York City Transit Authority
- Daily ridership: 11,474 (2023)

History
- Opened: May 15, 1941; 85 years ago

Technical
- Line length: 4 mi (6.4 km)
- Num of tracks: 2–4
- Character: Elevated, open–cut, embankment, underground
- Track gauge: 4 ft 8 1/2 in (1,435 mm)
- Electrification: 600V DC third rail

The IRT Dyre Avenue Line (formerly the IND Dyre Avenue–East 174th Street Line) is a New York City Subway rapid transit line, part of the A Division. It is a branch of the IRT White Plains Road Line in the northeastern section of the Bronx, north of East 180th Street. As of 2013, it has a daily ridership of 34,802.

The line is the only remaining portion of the New York, Westchester and Boston Railway (NYW&B). The NYW&B opened in 1912, providing service from the Harlem River to White Plains and New Rochelle (eventually to Port Chester). Service ended in 1937, and the line within New York City was acquired by the city in 1940, with shuttle service between Dyre Avenue and East 180th Street beginning the following year with IRT elevated cars. Through-service to Manhattan began in 1957, and the stations on the line were upgraded.

== Extent and service ==
The following services use part or all of the IRT Dyre Avenue Line:

	Time period	Services
"5" train	All times	Entire line

It is served by the 5 train, which makes all stops.

The line has three tracks for most of its length. A fourth track briefly joins south of Eastchester–Dyre Avenue and between Pelham Parkway and Morris Park. The southbound revenue track is a test track for new A Division trains. The fourth track (a trackbed for most of its length) was extended to test subway automation on the line and was initially used for layup and storage.

In the late 1990s, the southbound express track was extended from south of Dyre Avenue and connected to the stub end track at Pelham Parkway. The southbound track at Dyre Avenue is in the position of the southbound express track, as the southbound local track is no longer present. The current platform is built over the northbound express track. Small portions of the original side platforms remain on both sides of Dyre Avenue station. South of Dyre Avenue station, the southbound track moves over to the local position and the southbound express track begins.

The northbound express track was used for storage but this use has largely been made redundant by the expansion of Unionport Yard. A small portion of this track also exists between Baychester and Dyre Avenue stations. The portion between Baychester and Dyre Avenue stations is currently in the process of demolition. The other portion has been extended to the northern end of Pelham Parkway in conjunction to the signal modernization project on the line.

The north end of the line is a simple two-track stub just below the Bronx County line, which is used to store trains, with crossover tracks south of Dyre Avenue terminal. The south end is a flying junction (the Dyre Avenue Flyover), into the local tracks of the IRT White Plains Road Line (with crossovers to the express track).

The 5 stations (Eastchester–Dyre Avenue, Baychester Avenue, Gun Hill Road, Pelham Parkway and Morris Park) of the Dyre Avenue Line are the only stations in the whole NYC subway that don't have at least a booth that is staffed 24 hours per day, 7 days per week.

== History ==
=== Background ===
The Dyre Avenue Line was originally part of the four-track main line of the New York, Westchester and Boston Railway, an electrified commuter line that connected White Plains and Port Chester, New York to a station at the Harlem River adjacent to the IRT Third Avenue Line. The NYW&B opened on May 29, 1912. Soon a station opened at East 180th Street, where passengers could connect with the IRT White Plains Road Line and go into Manhattan and various surface lines. Express trains stopped within the Bronx only at Pelham Parkway and East 180th Street. The NYW&B was abandoned on December 31, 1937 due to bankruptcy.

Plans were made for a parallel subway line even before the NYW&B's abandonment; a 1929 expansion plan included a line along Morris Park Avenue, Wilson Avenue and Boston Road to Baychester Avenue, fed by the IND Second Avenue Line. When the IND Concourse Line was being built, the City, as part of the 1929 expansion plan, planned the line to be extended further east via Burke Avenue and Boston Road to Baychester Avenue. However, due to the Great Depression, money for the line ran out, and as a result the integration of the NYW&B line was seen as a cheaper way to serve the Northeast Bronx. In 1939, after abandonment, the plan was to integrate the former NYW&B to Dyre Avenue into the IRT system branching off the IRT Pelham Line as the Westchester and Boston Line. It was later decided to only utilize the line north of the East 180th Street station, even though the line continued to the Harlem River Terminal paralleling the New Haven Railroad (NHRR) right-of-way. However, a track connection to the NHRR was built in 1955 for equipment and material transfer and interchanges, including new car deliveries. The R17s were delivered via this connection in 1955, and the R33/R36s were delivered via the connection in February 1964.

=== Acquisition ===
The New York City Board of Transportation (BOT) bought the NYW&B within the Bronx north of East 180th Street in April 1940 for $1,800,000 and rehabilitated the line. The line was converted to accommodate IRT cars, and the 11,000 Volt AC power supply and the catenary were replaced by 600 Volt DC power supply via the third rails. Signals from the BMT Fulton Street Line were installed on the line. The Board of Transportation rehabilitated twenty old surplus gate cars, numbered 1580–1587, 1589–1600, and 107, that were operating on the Third Avenue Elevated to use on the line.

On March 19, 1941, a trailing point was built in from the existing White Plains Road Line to the former Track 3 of the NYW&B just north of the East 180th Street station, near the original IRT tower, and under the present Bronx River Parkway bridge. This granted access to the newly BOT-owned line for construction purposes, specifically re-electrification and signaling.

The first train, an official train consisting of four cars with the Mayor and City officials, departed from East 180th Street at 11:21 AM on May 15, 1941. Trains on the line were shuttles, with a paper transfer to the IRT White Plains Road Line at East 180th Street. When the city began operating the line it was considered as part of the IND Division internally, with IND crews operating the line, because the city takeover of the IRT and BMT required that new lines be part of the city-operated IND system. The line was known as the IND Dyre Avenue–East 174th Street Line. However, to the riding public the line was advertised as an IRT line. Shuttle trains consisting of two cars operated on the line and there was no late night service when the line opened in 1941. The fares were collected in the stations during rush hours, and by conductors on the trains when ridership was light. The signs for stations on the Dyre Avenue Line used IND signs, with white letters on a green background. During its first year as a subway line, 637,148 riders used it.

Plans for restoring the old line north into Westchester County failed. For a few years, the line retained the 11,000-volt catenary on the express tracks in case service to Westchester was resumed. After the Dyre Avenue line was opened using the outer tracks (tracks Y1 and Y2), and once it was certain that service to Westchester would not be revived, the superfluous trackage from NYW&B days was removed, along with the catenary supports, for the World War II scrap drive of 1943.

The connecting switch from the White Plains Road Line was not regularly used to bring in extra equipment or lay up a train on the Dyre Avenue Line itself until November 1952, and then only via new switches and the former Track 3, now Y1, at East 180th Street station. By this time some middle trackage had been restored as “Y3 and Y4” through Morris Park station and south of Dyre Avenue. The Y4 siding was later extended from Morris Park toward, but not to, Pelham Parkway by July 1971. On March 28, 1955, the NYCTA contracted with the New Haven Railroad (NHRR) for the installation of a non-electrified siding coming off NHRR track 1 below East 177th Street and using what would have been the alignment of NYW&B Track 2, track Y4. Third rail was installed north of East 177th Street, where the siding also swung over to the alignment of NYW&B track 4, track Y2 so as to line into the existing Y2 track at the local side of the station.

In March 1954, the old gate cars were replaced by Hi-V cars. In October 1956 several Steinway cars were assigned to service on the line, and continued to serve the line until through service began.

=== Improvements ===
Entrance into Dyre Avenue Station, November 2026

The Dyre Avenue Line was connected directly to the White Plains Road Line north of East 180th Street for $3 million and through service began on May 6, 1957. The connection was originally supposed to open in 1950. Two days prior, on May 4, 1957, the operation of the line was transferred from the IND Division to the IRT Division, making it the IRT Dyre Avenue–East 174th Street Line. The project was started in 1949 but was delayed because the necessary subway cars for the service were not available. With the connection, the line became part of the IRT Division. Night service would continue to be operated by a shuttle. At this time, the old NYW&B station was closed and the trackage through the former station was made non-revenue, and it remains in part as a siding designated Track Y1A. Through service was operated by Seventh Avenue express trains between 5:30 AM and 8:30 PM. Between 8:30 and 1:15 shuttle trains operated from East 180th Street to Dyre Avenue, and in the early morning hours no trains operated over the line. On June 27, 1956, late-night shuttle service was implemented on a six-month trial basis.

In 1957-1960, on the grounds of the former Starlight Amusement Park, the last wooden MUDC cars and many Hi-V Steel subway cars were scrapped and burned. The tracks south of East 180th Street were used to hold the cars before the cars were disposed of.

On February 27, 1962, the Transit Authority announced a $700,000 modernization plan of the Dyre Avenue Line. The plan included the reconstruction of the Dyre Avenue station, and the extension of the platforms of the other four stations on the line to 525 feet (160 m) to accommodate ten-car trains. At the time, the line was served by 9-car trains during the day, and 3-car shuttles overnight. Between 1954 and 1961, ridership on the line increased by 100%, owing to the development of the northeast Bronx. The Dyre Avenue station was rebuilt as part of the plan in 1963–1964. A 525 feet (160 m)-long concrete island platform was built atop the line's former northbound express track, and the wooden northbound platform was removed following the project's completion. Two new staircases were installed to the platform. A canopy was installed, covering the center of the platform, in addition to fluorescent lighting. The preexisting entrance to the station was sealed off, replaced by a new entrance on the station's west side. A new change booth and restrooms were installed. Previously, trains had used the northbound side platform as the terminal with the southbound platform unused. Remnants of the side platforms still exist.

On April 18, 1965, IRT Broadway–Seventh Avenue Line trains and IRT Lexington Avenue Line trains swapped their northern routings, with Broadway–Seventh Avenue 2 trains running via the IRT White Plains Road Line to 241st Street, and Lexington Avenue 5 trains running via the Dyre Avenue Line to Dyre Avenue. The line is still operated as a shuttle late nights.

In 1986, the New York City Transit Authority launched a study to determine whether to close 79 stations on 11 routes, including the entire Dyre Avenue Line, due to low ridership and high repair costs. Numerous figures, including New York City Council member Carol Greitzer, criticized the plans.

=== Removal of vestiges ===
The siding connection between the Dyre Avenue Line at East 180th Street and the Penn Central (former New Haven Railroad) was discontinued on August 12, 1975, and the third rail was removed south of the station in 1979, where retired IRT subway cars were stored, and as of 1979 the physical connection between the line and what is now the Amtrak Northeast Corridor/CSX was permanently removed. The elevated structure between East 177th and Lebanon Streets was dismantled in the early 2000s, and housing was built on part of the former rail line's right-of-way in 2013.

In 2003–2004 the former NYW&B elevated structure was demolished south of Lebanon Street. The former right-of-way was redeveloped with new buildings, and parking lots. Between 2006 and 2008, the earthen embankment from East 177th Street south to East 172nd Street at the Amtrak ROW was totally excavated and all that fill was removed to provide flat ground for redevelopment. The section between East 177th Street and East 174th Street was redeveloped into the Bronx Greenway–Starlight Park. A catenary signal gantry from the NYW&B was preserved and is located inside the park.

== Station listing ==
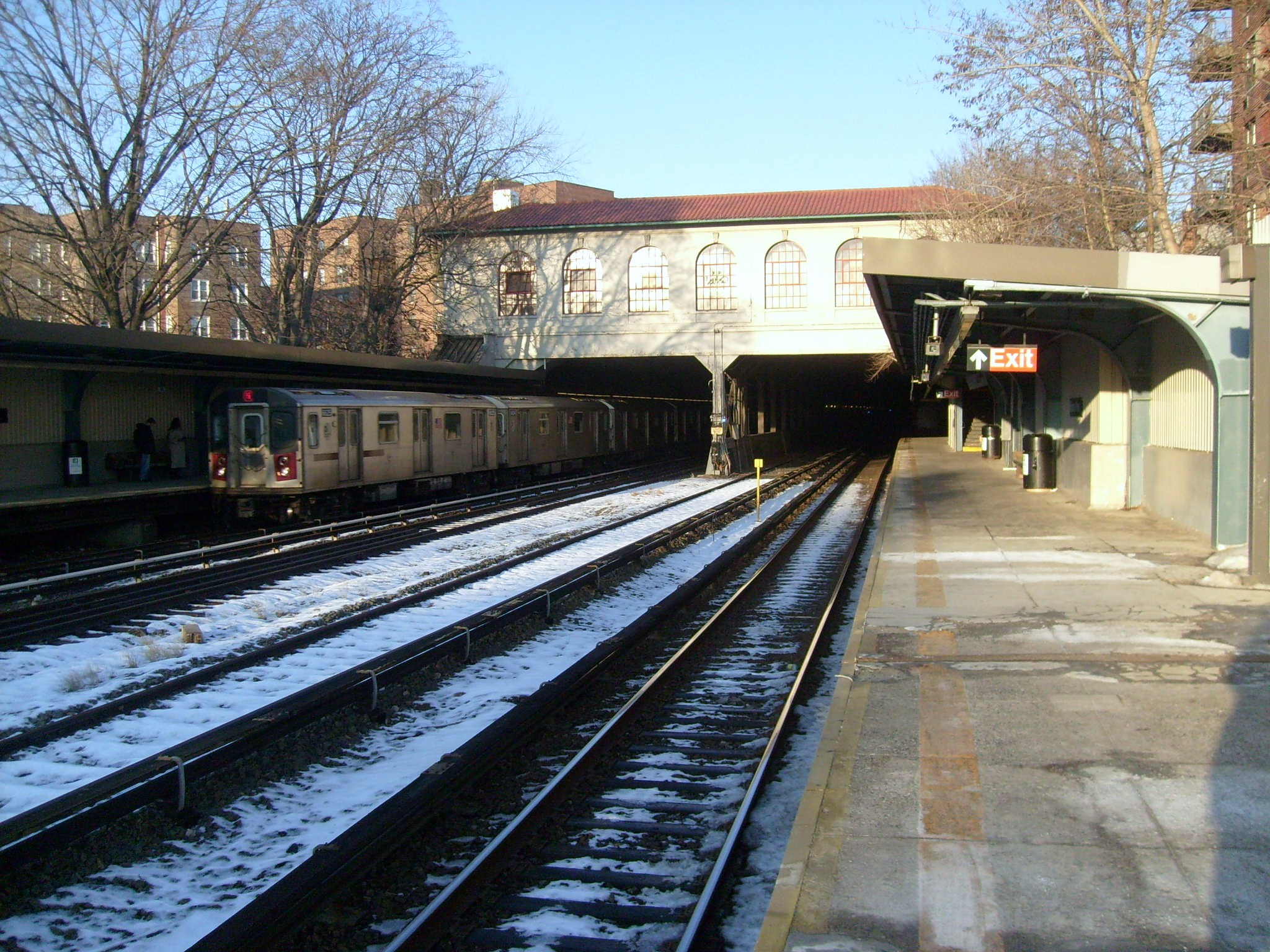
A 5 train enters the Morris Park station in the Bronx on the IRT Dyre Avenue Line

Station service legend
Stops all times	Stops 24 hours a day
Stops late nights only	Stops every day during overnight hours only
Stops weekdays and weekday late nights	Stops during weekday daytime hours and weekday overnight hours
Stops weekends and weekend late nights	Stops during weekend overnight hours and weekend overnight hours
Time period details
Disabled access	Station is compliant with the Americans with Disabilities Act
↑	Station is compliant with the Americans with Disabilities Act in the indicated direction only
↓	Station is compliant with the Americans with Disabilities Act in the indicated direction only
	Elevator access to mezzanine only

Neighborhood (approximate)	Disabled access	Station	Tracks	Services	Opened	Notes
Remainder of NYW&B in Westchester County abandoned
Eastchester		Eastchester–Dyre Avenue		5	May 29, 1912 (NYW&B); May 15, 1941 (IRT)	Originally a local station with two side platforms on the NYW&B. Converted to an island platform by the NYCTA.
Baychester		Baychester Avenue	local	5	May 29, 1912 (NYW&B); May 15, 1941 (IRT)	
Baychester	Disabled access	Gun Hill Road	local	5	May 29, 1912 (NYW&B); May 15, 1941 (IRT)	
Pelham Parkway		Pelham Parkway	all	5	May 29, 1912 (NYW&B); May 15, 1941 (IRT)	Bx12 Select Bus Service; Was an express station on the NYW&B
Morris Park		Morris Park	local	5	May 29, 1912 (NYW&B); May 15, 1941 (IRT)	
Connecting Track to Unionport Yard
Merges with IRT White Plains Road Line (5 )
Remainder of NYW&B abandoned or demolished
