= Eastchester–Dyre Avenue station =

New York City Subway station in the Bronx

Eastchester–Dyre Avenue
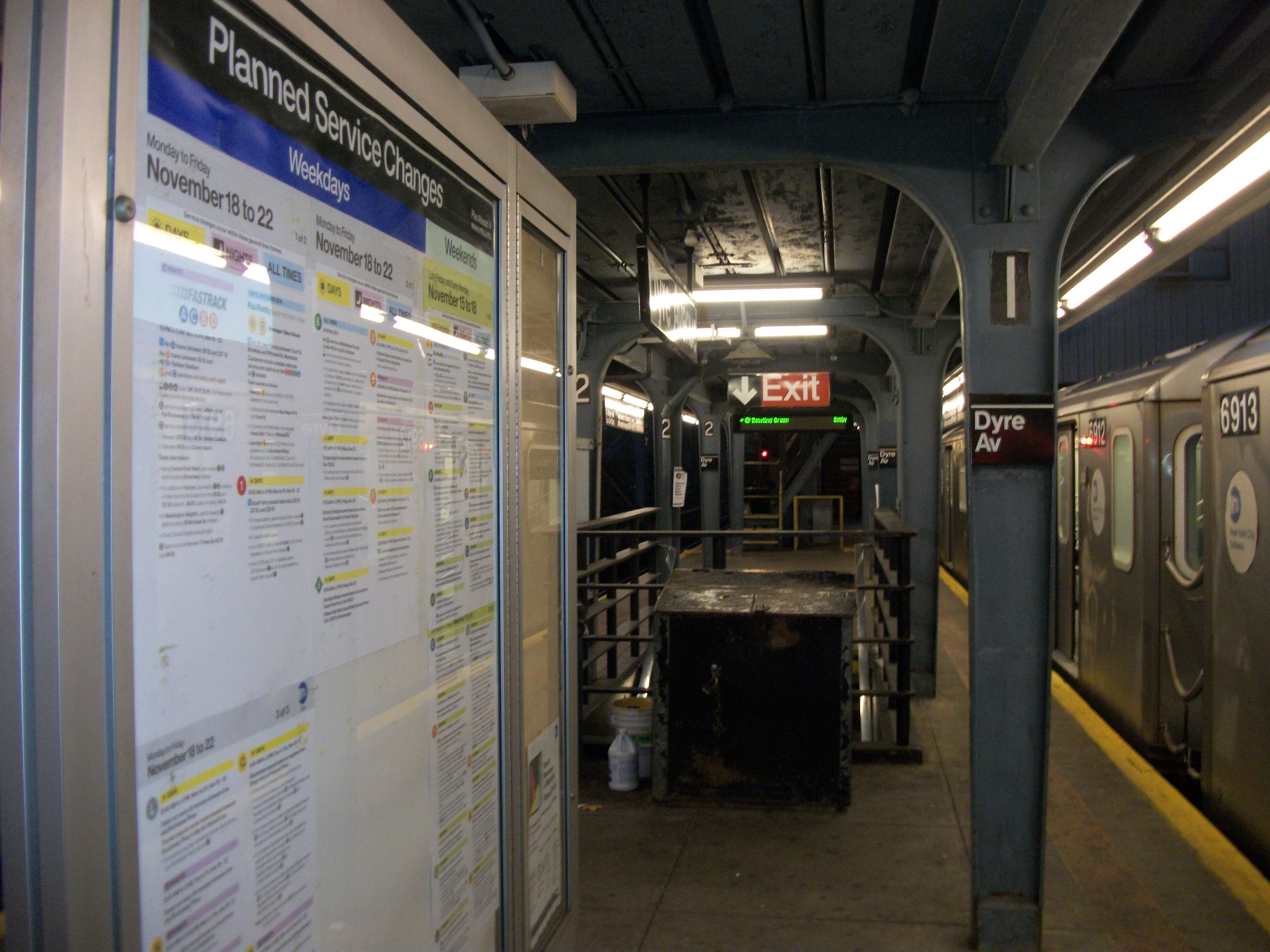
- Dusk shot of a train on track 1 in November 2013

Station statistics
- Address: Dyre Avenue & Light Street; Bronx, New York
- Borough: The Bronx
- Locale: Eastchester
- Coordinates: 40.889055°N 73.830614°W
- Division: A (IRT, formerly NYW&B)
- Line: IRT Dyre Avenue Line
- Services: 5 (all times)
- Transit: NYCT Bus: Bx16; Bee-Line Bus: 52, 55
- Structure: Embankment / Elevated
- Platforms: 1 Island platform
- Tracks: 2

Other information
- Opened: May 29, 1912; 114 years ago (NYW&B station)
- Closed: December 12, 1937; 88 years ago (NYW&B station)
- Rebuilt: May 15, 1941; 85 years ago (as a Subway station)
- Accessible: No; planned

Traffic
- 2025: 758,779 ▲8.5%
- Rank: 348 out of 423
Services
Preceding station	New York City Subway	Following station
Terminus	Local	Baychester Avenue toward Flatbush Avenue–Brooklyn College
Non-revenue services and lines
Preceding station	New York City Subway	Following station
Terminus	no service	Pelham Parkway express
Former services
Preceding station	New York, Westchester and Boston Railway	Following station
Kingsbridge Road toward White Plains or Port Chester via Columbus Avenue	Main Line	Baychester Avenue toward Harlem River
Location
Location within New York City Subway
Location within New York City
Location within New York
Track layout
Street map
Station service legend
Symbol	Description
Stops all times	Stops all times
Stops weekdays and weekday late nights	Stops weekdays and weekday late nights
Stops weekends and weekend late nights	Stops weekends and weekend late nights

The Eastchester–Dyre Avenue station (signed as simply Dyre Avenue) is the northern terminal station of the IRT Dyre Avenue Line of the New York City Subway, at Dyre Avenue and Light Street (one block south of East 233rd Street) in the Eastchester neighborhood of the Bronx. It is served by the 5 train at all times. The station opened on May 29, 1912, as a local station of the New York, Westchester and Boston Railway, and closed in 1937 when the railway went bankrupt. It reopened as a subway station on May 15, 1941, with through service beginning in 1957.

== History ==
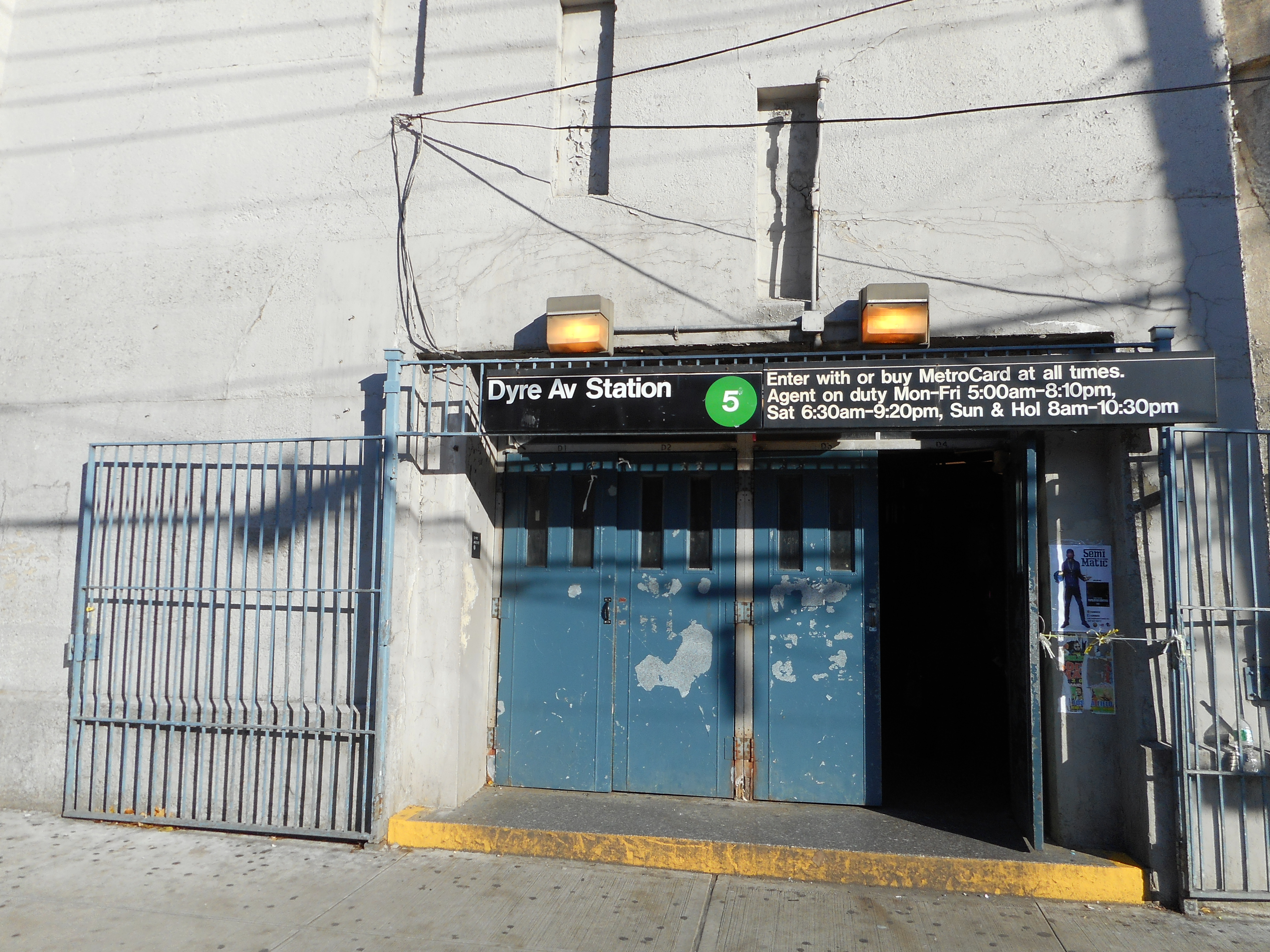
View of the station house

This station opened on May 29, 1912 as a local station of the New York, Westchester and Boston Railway (NYW&B). It closed on December 12, 1937 when the NYW&B went bankrupt. In 1940, New York City purchased the right of way from the Bronx/Westchester County boundary southward. On May 15, 1941, a shuttle service was implemented between Dyre Avenue and East 180th Street using IRT gate cars. In 1957, a physical connection was made to the IRT White Plains Road Line, and through 2 train service was provided. Then in 1966 the 5 replaced the 2 train on this line to the present day as well.

On February 27, 1962, the Transit Authority announced a $700,000 modernization plan of the Dyre Avenue Line. The plan included the reconstruction of the Dyre Avenue station. At the time, the line was served by 9-car trains during the day, and 3-car shuttles overnight. Between 1954 and 1961, ridership on the line increased by 100%, owing to the development of the northeast Bronx. Ridership at this station increased from 207,250 to 579,474.

The Dyre Avenue station was rebuilt as part of the plan in 1963–1964. A 525 foot (160 m)-long concrete island platform was built atop the line's former northbound express track, and the wooden northbound platform was removed following the project's completion. Two new staircases were installed to the platform. A canopy was installed, covering the center of the platform, in addition to fluorescent lighting. The preexisting entrance to the station was sealed off, replaced by a new entrance on the station's west side. A new change booth and restrooms were installed. Previously, trains had used the northbound side platform as the terminal with the southbound platform unused. Remnants of the side platforms still exist.

In July 2025, the MTA announced that it would install elevators at 12 stations, including the Eastchester–Dyre Avenue station, as part of its 2025–2029 capital program. The elevators would make the station fully compliant with the Americans with Disabilities Act of 1990.

== Station layout ==
This station has two tracks and an island platform, and is located on an elevated structure at its southern end and on an embankment at its northern end. The station, served by the 5 train at all times, is the northern terminus of the route; the next stop south is Baychester Avenue. The city of Mount Vernon, in Westchester County, is 0.3 miles (0.48 km) uphill. The station originally consisted of four tracks flanked by two side platforms. After the line was taken over by the NYCTA, the side platforms were removed, with a small piece of the northbound remaining, and the four tracks were converted to two tracks using the northbound local and southbound express tracks. The island platform was placed over the northbound express trackbed. The NYW&B's southbound local trackbed can still be seen, and is currently used only for an electrical shed on the north end of the bridge, as well as girders holding up two construction trailers used by Metropolitan Transportation Authority crew members over the south end of the bridge. The two tracks extend one train length past the station, and end at bumper blocks.

=== Exit ===
The station's only station house is on ground level with doors to the east side of Dyre Avenue on the northeast corner of Light Street. It has a token booth, turnstile bank, and two staircases to the platform. It is one of the only five stations (Eastchester–Dyre Avenue, Baychester Avenue, Gun Hill Road, Pelham Parkway and Morris Park) in the whole NYC subway that don't have at least a booth that is staffed 24 hours per day, 7 days per week.
