= New York City Subway =

Rapid transit system in New York City

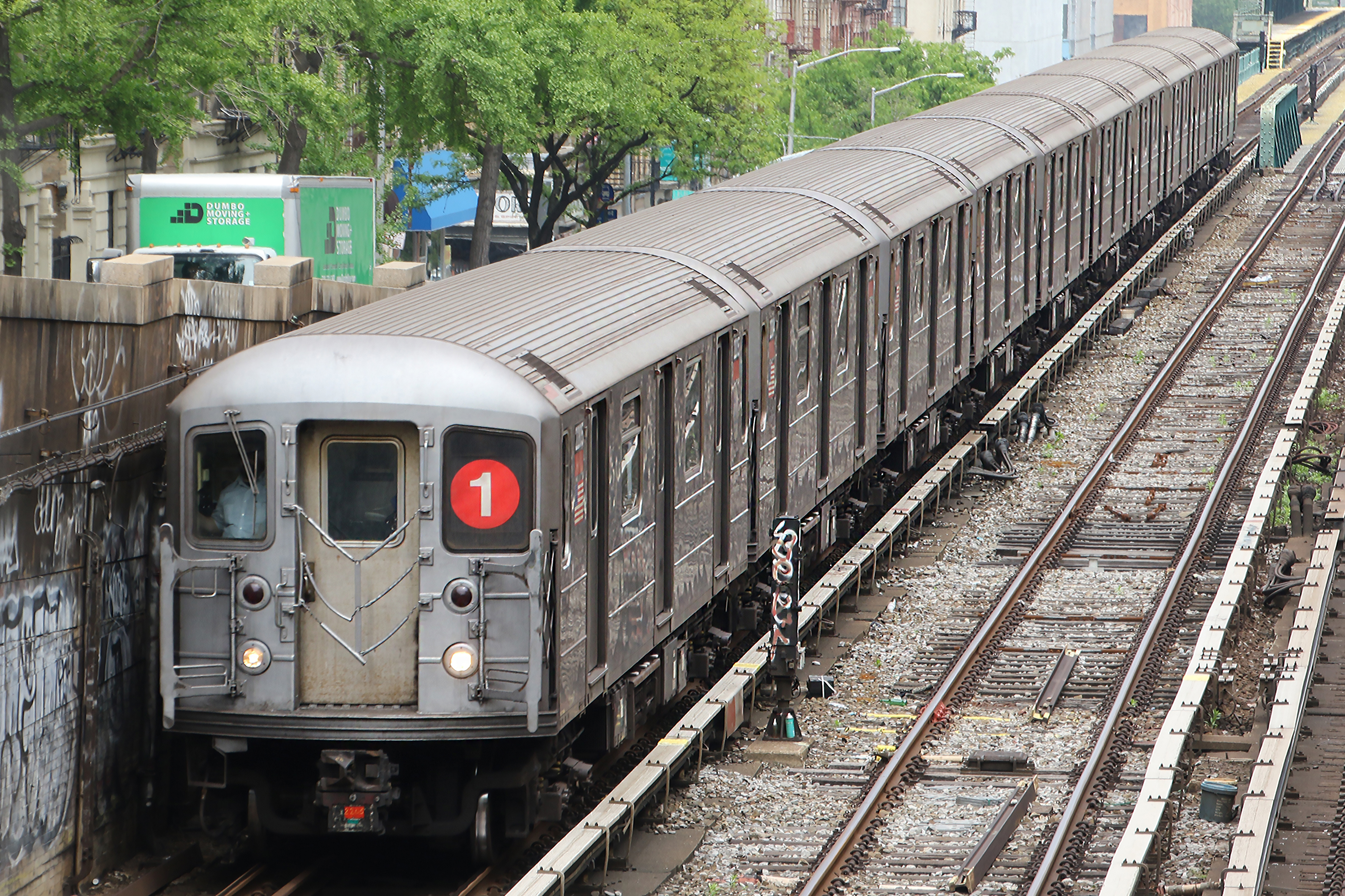

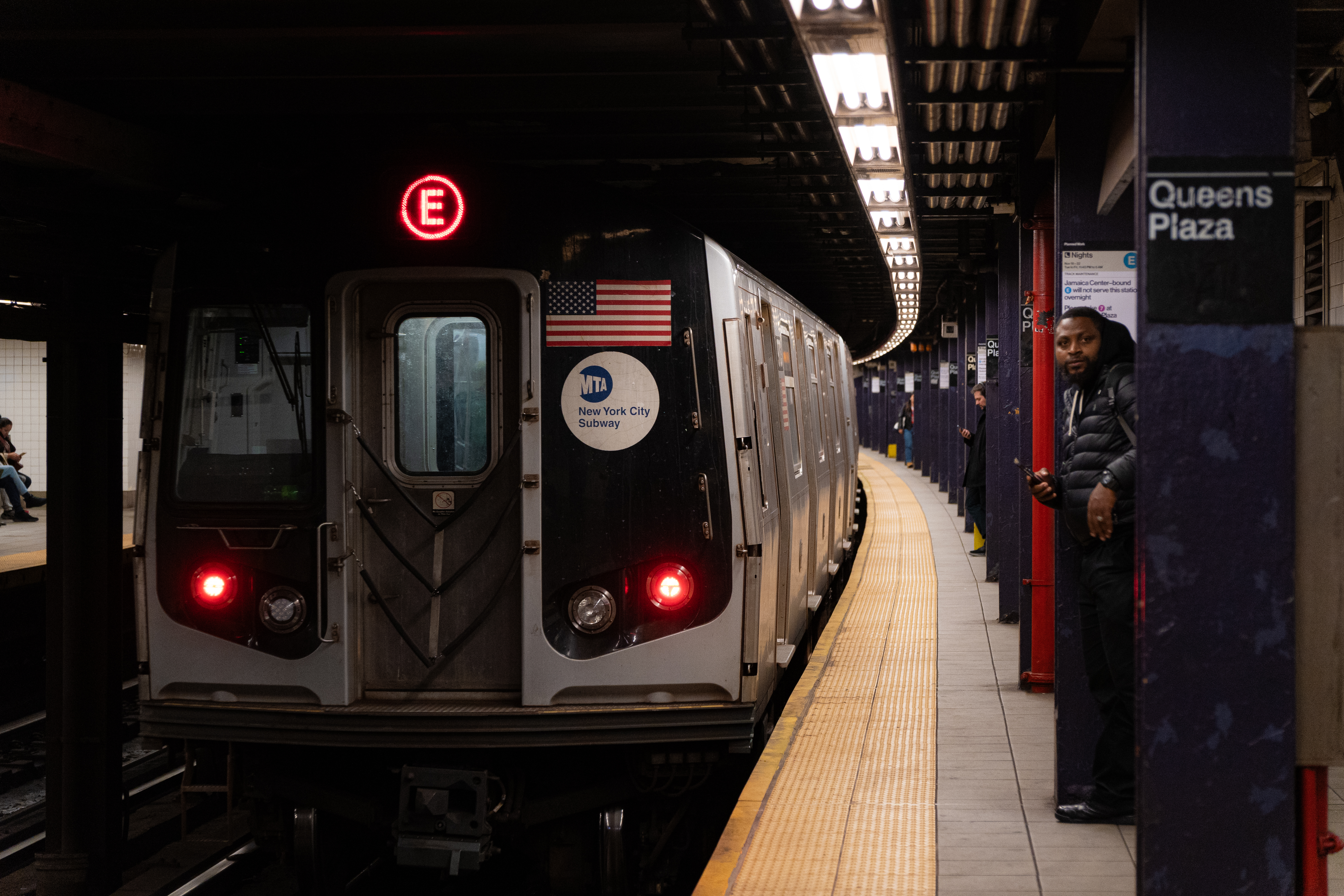
- Top: A 1 local train made up of ten Bombardier R62A cars leaves the 125th Street Station of the IRT Broadway–Seventh Avenue Line. Bottom: An E local train made up of ten Alstom R160A cars leaves the Queens Plaza station of the IND Queens Boulevard Line.

Overview
- Owner: City of New York
- Area served: The Bronx, Brooklyn, Manhattan, and Queens
- Locale: New York City
- Transit type: Rapid transit
- Number of lines: 36 lines (Note: These are the physical tracks that a train "service" runs on. See New York City Subway nomenclature for more information.); 25 services (1 planned) (Note: These "services" run on physical tracks. See New York City Subway nomenclature for more information.)
- Number of stations: 472 (MTA total count) (Note: There are 16 stations on the IND Second Avenue Line and 1 station on the IRT Flushing Line planned.: The Second Avenue Line has 3 active stations and 16 planned stations.; The Tenth Avenue station will be constructed as an in-fill station once funding for it is secured.) (Note: Permanently closed stations are not counted.; Both the Chambers Street–World Trade Center (IND Eighth Avenue Line) and Canal Street (BMT Broadway Line) stations are considered two stations each by the MTA. If both of them are counted as one station each, the number of stations in the New York City Subway is 470 stations (or 423 by international standards).); 423 stations if station complexes are counted as one station (per international standards); 17 planned
- Annual ridership: 1,281,883,362 (2025) (linked transit passenger trips) (Note: Ridership data is typically derived from linked transit passenger trips (i.e., a passenger taking multiple lines on a single trip is counted only once). The American Public Transportation Association presents figures derived from unlinked transit passenger trips (i.e., each line on a single trip is counted separately).); 2,314,388,000 (2025) (unlinked transit passenger trips)
- Website: www.mta.info/agency/new-york-city-transit

Operation
- Began operation: October 27, 1904; 122 years ago (Original subway); July 3, 1868; 158 years ago (first elevated, rapid transit operation); October 9, 1863; 163 years ago (first railroad operation) (Note: The IRT main line, which is considered to be the first New York City "subway" line, opened in 1904; the Ninth Avenue Line, a predecessor elevated railroad line, operated its first trial run on July 3, 1868, according to Facts and Figures 1979–80, published by the New York City Transit Authority See also nycsubway.org Archived October 7, 2008, at the Wayback Machine; and the West End Line, which opened in 1863. A small portion of the latter line's original right-of-way, part of an extension opened in 1864, is still in daily use near Coney Island. thethirdrail.net Archived May 23, 2006, at the Wayback Machine)
- Operator: New York City Transit Authority (NYCTA)
- Number of vehicles: 6,787
- Headway: Peak hours: 2–10 minutes Off-peak: 8–16 minutes

Technical
- System length: Route length: 248 mi (399 km); Revenue track: 665 mi (1,070 km); Total track: 850 mi (1,370 km)
- Track gauge: 4 ft 8 1/2 in (1,435 mm) standard gauge
- Electrification: Third rail, 625 V DC (Note: 625 V DC is nominal, but can fluctuate between 600 and 650 V.)
- Average speed: 17.4 mph (28.0 km/h)
- Top speed: 55 mph (89 km/h)
System map

The New York City Subway is a rapid transit system in New York City, serving four of the city's five boroughs: Manhattan, Brooklyn, Queens, and the Bronx. It is owned by the government of New York City and leased to the New York City Transit Authority, an affiliate agency of the state-run Metropolitan Transportation Authority (MTA). Opened on October 27, 1904, the New York City Subway is one of the world's oldest public transit systems, and the one with the most stations, with 423 stations in operation (472, if stations connected by transfers are counted multiple times).

The system has operated 24/7 service every day of the year throughout most of its history, barring emergencies and disasters. By annual ridership, the New York City Subway is the busiest rapid transit system in the Western Hemisphere, as well as among the 20 busiest rapid transit rail systems in the world. The subway served 1,281,883,362 linked transit passengers trips, or 2,314,388,000 unlinked transit passenger trips in 2025. Daily ridership has been calculated since 1985; the record, over 6.2 million, was set on October 29, 2015.

The system is also among the world's 20 longest. Overall, the system consists of 248 miles (399 km) of routes, comprising a total of 665 miles (1,070 km) of revenue track and a total of 850 miles (1,370 km) including non-revenue trackage. Of the system's 25 routes or "services" (which usually share track or "lines" with other services), 22 pass through Manhattan, the exceptions being the G train, the Franklin Avenue Shuttle, and the Rockaway Park Shuttle. Large portions of the subway outside Manhattan are elevated, on embankments, or in open cuts, and a few stretches of track run at ground level; 40% of the track is above ground. Many lines and stations have both express and local services. These lines have three or four tracks. Normally, the outer two are used by local trains, while the inner one or two are used by express trains.

As of 2018, the New York City Subway's budgetary burden for expenditures was $8.7 billion, supported by collection of fares, bridge tolls, and earmarked regional taxes and fees, as well as direct funding from state and local governments.

== History ==
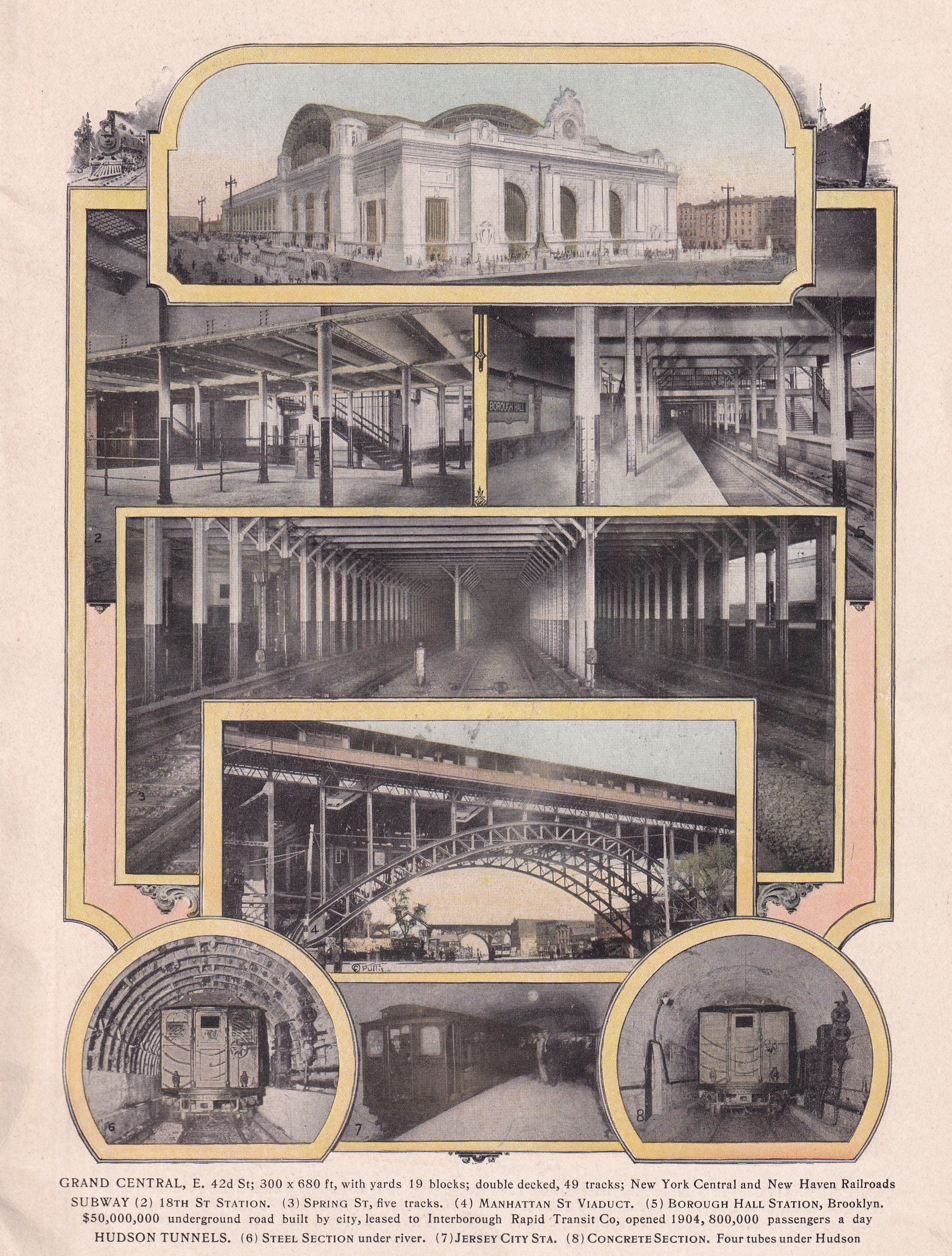
Some old pictures from the New York City Subway (1910)

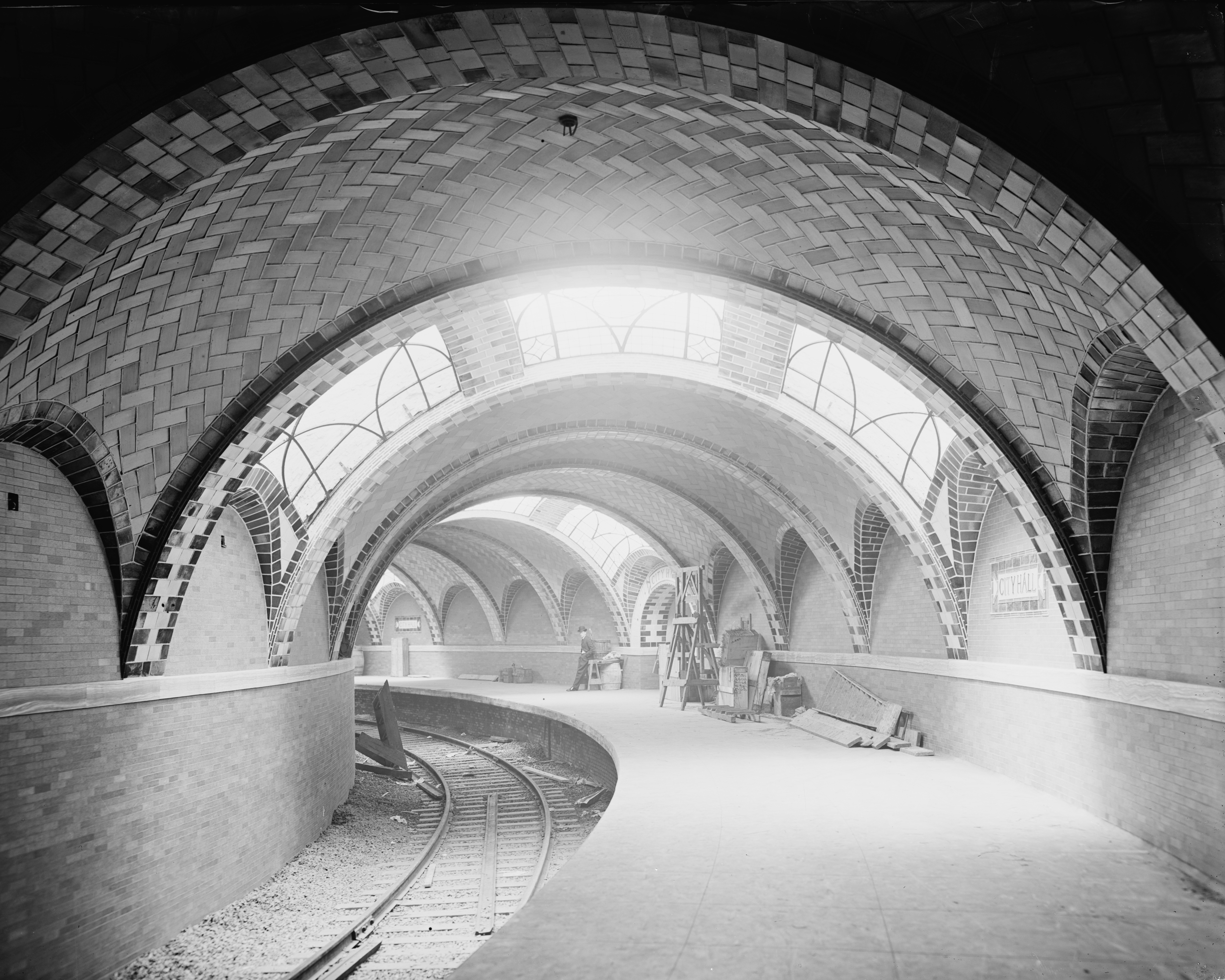
The City Hall station of the IRT Lexington Avenue Line, part of the first underground line of the subway that opened on October 27, 1904

Alfred Ely Beach built the first demonstration for an underground transit system in New York City in 1869 and opened it in February 1870. His Beach Pneumatic Transit only extended 312 feet (95 m) under Broadway in Lower Manhattan operating from Warren Street to Murray Street and exhibited his idea for an atmospheric railway as a subway. The tunnel was never extended for political and financial reasons. Today, no part of this line remains as the tunnel was completely within the limits of the present-day City Hall station under Broadway. The Great Blizzard of 1888 helped demonstrate the benefits of an underground transportation system. A plan for the construction of the subway was approved in 1894, and construction began in 1900. Even though the underground portions of the subway had yet to be built, several above-ground segments of the modern-day New York City Subway system were already in service by then. The oldest structure still in use opened in 1885 as part of the BMT Lexington Avenue Line in Brooklyn and is now part of the BMT Jamaica Line. The oldest right-of-way, which is part of the BMT West End Line near Coney Island Creek, was in use in 1864 as a steam railroad called the Brooklyn, Bath and Coney Island Rail Road.

The first underground line of the subway opened on October 27, 1904, almost 36 years after the opening of the first elevated line in New York City (which became the IRT Ninth Avenue Line). The 9.1-mile (14.6 km) subway line, then called the "Manhattan Main Line", ran from City Hall station northward under Lafayette Street (then named Elm Street) and Park Avenue (then named Fourth Avenue) before turning westward at 42nd Street. It then curved northward again at Times Square, continuing under Broadway before terminating at 145th Street station in Harlem. Its operation was leased to the Interborough Rapid Transit Company (IRT), and over 150,000 passengers paid the 5-cent fare ($2 in 2025 dollars) to ride it on the first day of operation.

By the late 1900s and early 1910s, the lines had been consolidated into two privately owned systems, the IRT and the Brooklyn Rapid Transit Company (BRT, later Brooklyn–Manhattan Transit Corporation, BMT). The city built most of the lines and leased them to the companies. The first line of the city-owned and operated Independent Subway System (IND) opened in 1932. This system was intended to compete with the private systems and allow some of the elevated railways to be torn down but stayed within the core of the city due to its small startup capital. This required it to be run 'at cost', necessitating fares up to double the five-cent fare of the time, or 10¢ ($4 in 2025 dollars).

In 1940, the city bought the two private systems. Some elevated lines ceased service immediately while others closed soon after. Integration was slow, but several connections were built between the IND and BMT. These now operate as one division, called the B Division. Since the former IRT tunnels are narrower, have sharper curves, and shorter station platforms, they cannot accommodate B Division cars, and the former IRT remains its own division, the A Division. Many passenger transfers between stations of all three former companies have been created, allowing the entire network to be treated as a single unit.

During the late 1940s, the system recorded high ridership, and on December 23, 1946, the system-wide record of 8,872,249 fares was set.

The New York City Transit Authority (NYCTA), a public authority of New York City, was created in 1953 to take over subway, bus, and streetcar operations from the city, and placed under control of the state-level Metropolitan Transportation Authority in 1968.

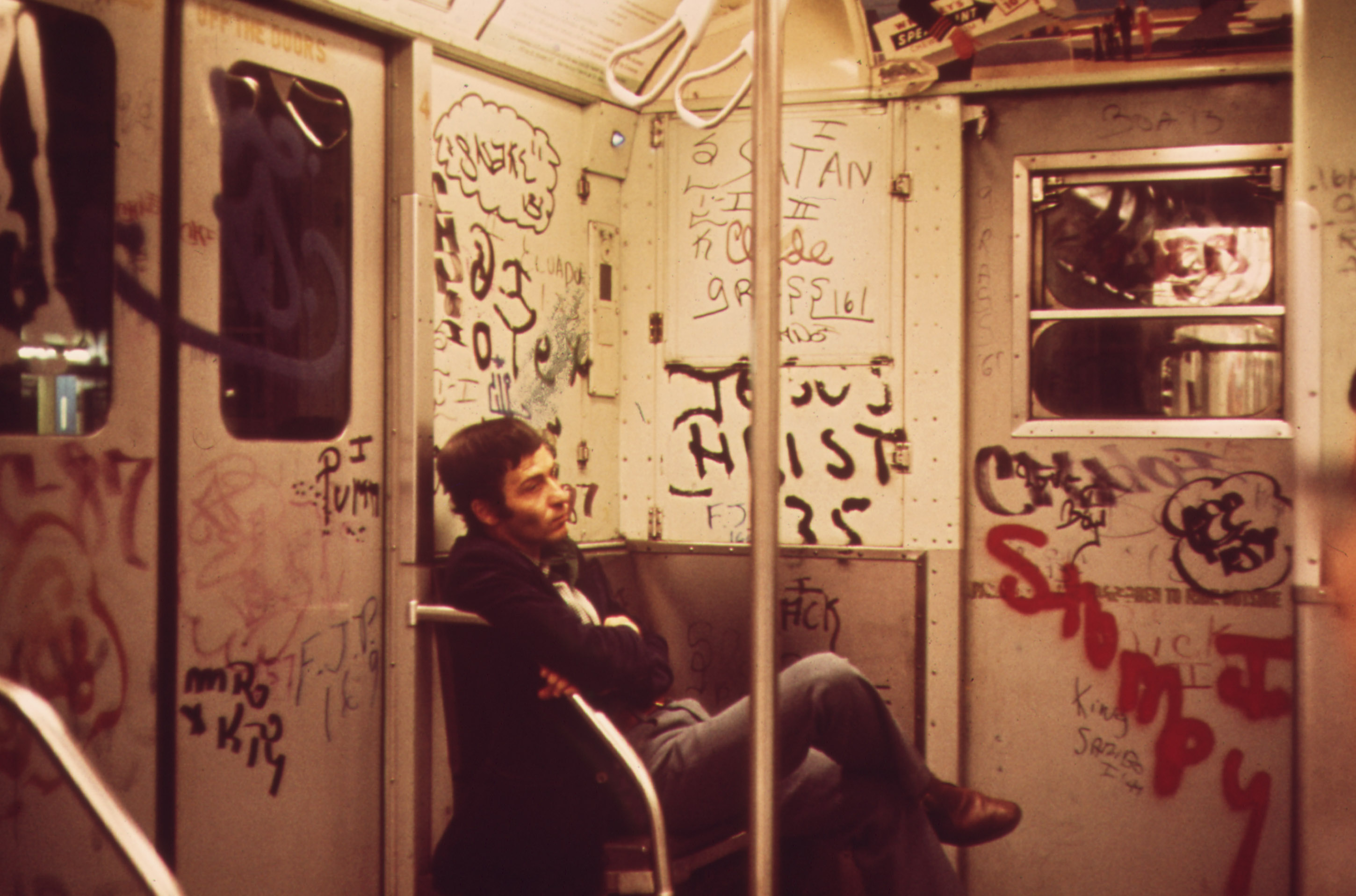
Graffiti became a notable symbol of declining service during the 1970s.

Organized in 1934 by transit workers of the BRT, IRT, and IND, the Transport Workers Union of America Local 100 remains the largest and most influential local of the labor unions. Since the union's founding, there have been three union strikes over contract disputes with the MTA: 12 days in 1966, 11 days in 1980, and three days in 2005.

By the 1970s and 1980s, the New York City Subway was at an all-time low. Ridership had dropped to 1910s levels, and graffiti and crime were rampant. Maintenance was poor, and delays and track problems were common. Still, the NYCTA managed to open six new subway stations in the 1980s, make the current fleet of subway cars graffiti-free, as well as order 1,775 new subway cars. By the early 1990s, conditions had improved significantly, although maintenance backlogs accumulated during those 20 years are still being fixed today.

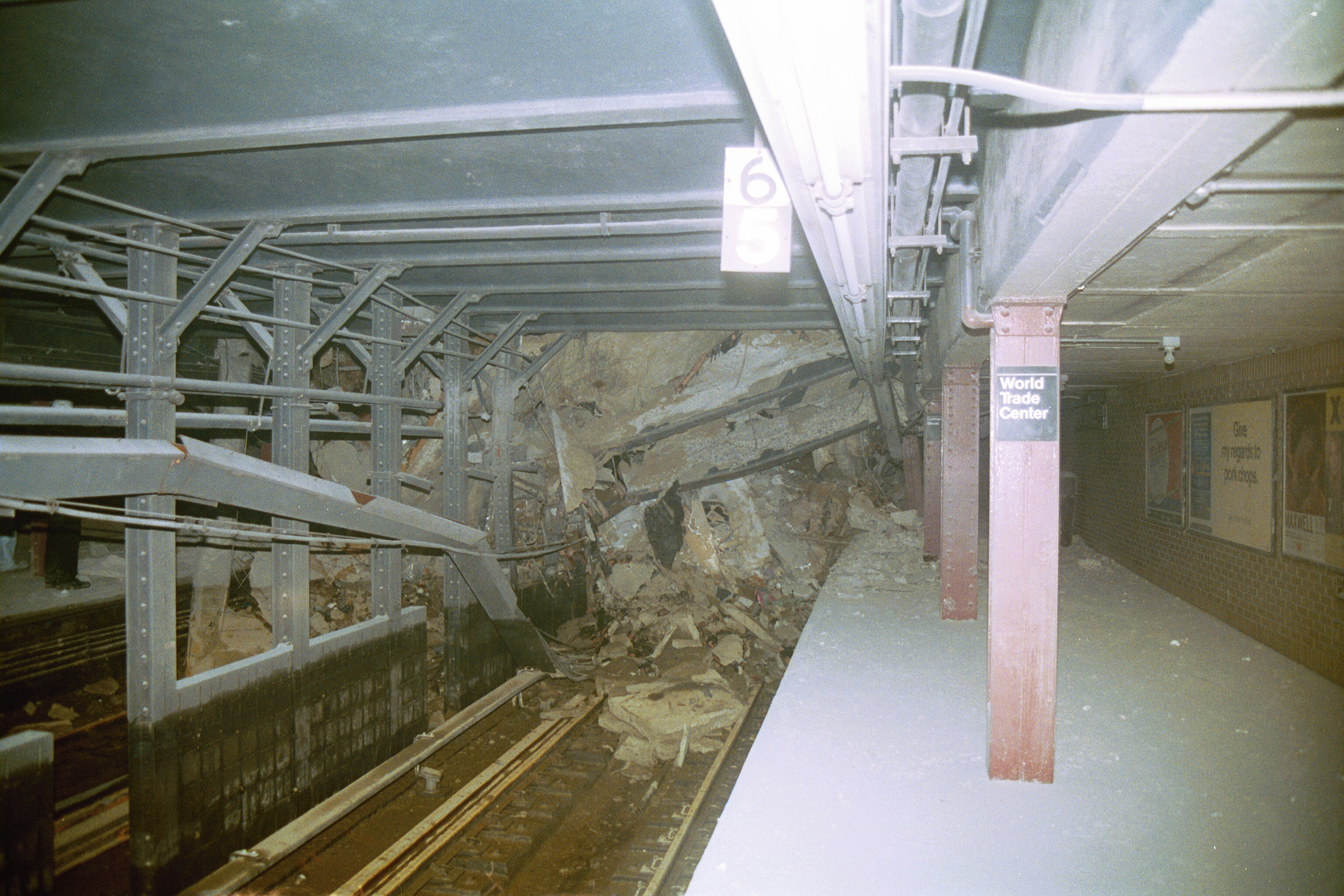
The Cortlandt Street station partially collapsed as a result of the collapse of the World Trade Center.

Entering the 21st century, progress continued despite several disasters. The September 11 attacks resulted in service disruptions on lines running through Lower Manhattan, particularly the IRT Broadway–Seventh Avenue Line, which ran directly underneath the World Trade Center. Sections of the tunnel, as well as the Cortlandt Street station, which was directly underneath the Twin Towers, were severely damaged. Rebuilding required the suspension of service on that line south of Chambers Street. Ten other nearby stations were closed for cleanup. By March 2002, seven of those stations had reopened. Except for Cortlandt Street, the rest reopened in September 2002, along with service south of Chambers Street. Cortlandt Street reopened in September 2018.

In October 2012, Hurricane Sandy flooded several underwater tunnels and other facilities near New York Harbor, as well as trackage over Jamaica Bay. The immediate damage was fixed within six months, but long-term resiliency and rehabilitation projects continued for several years. The recovery projects after the hurricane included the restoration of the new South Ferry station from 2012 to 2017; the full closure of the Montague Street Tunnel from 2013 to 2014; and the partial 14th Street Tunnel shutdown from 2019 to 2020. Annual ridership on the New York City Subway system, which totaled nearly 1.7 billion unlinked transit passenger trips in 2019, declined dramatically during the COVID-19 pandemic and did not surpass one billion again until 2022.

=== Construction methods ===
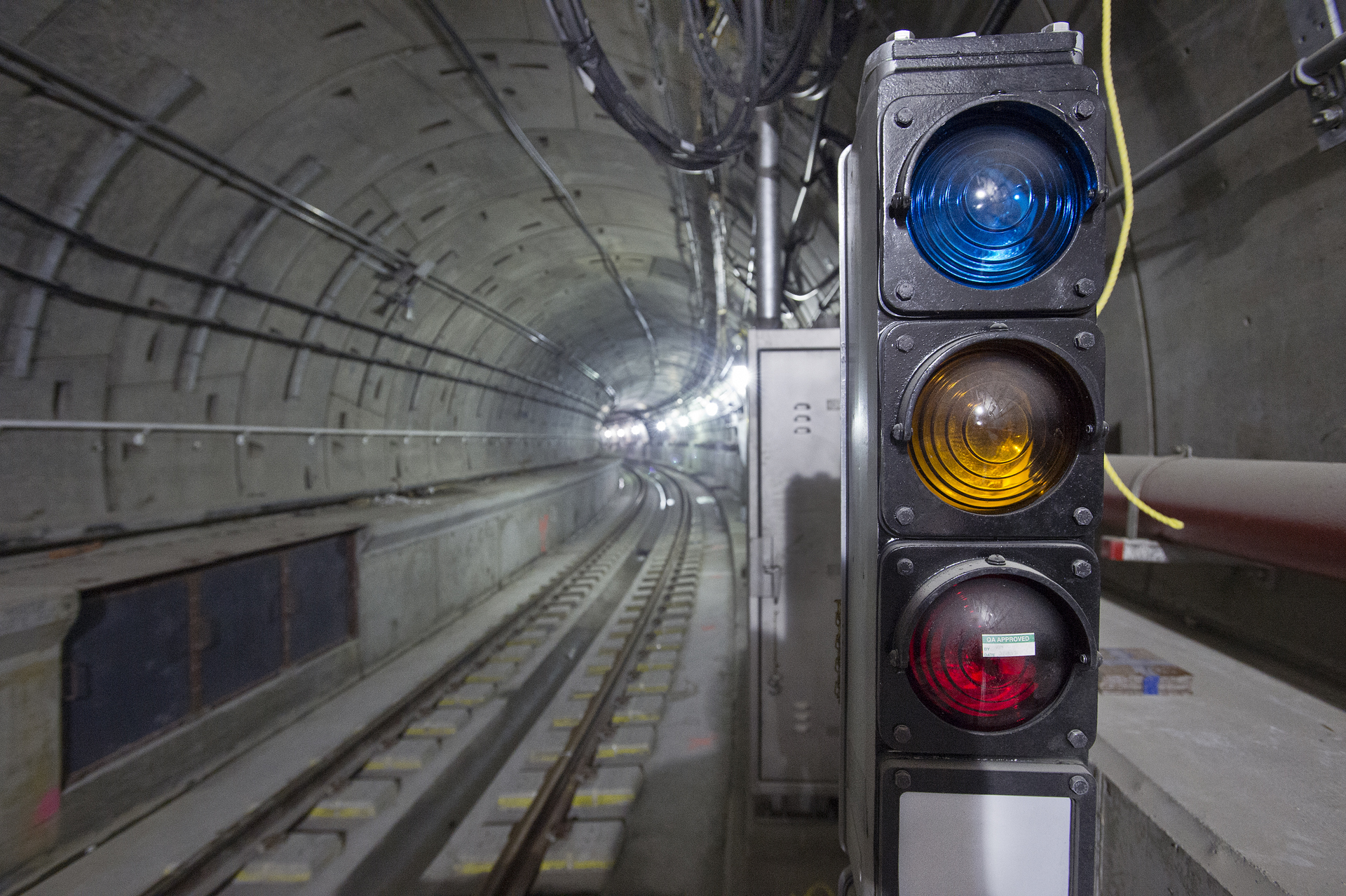
A stretch of subway track on the 7 Subway Extension

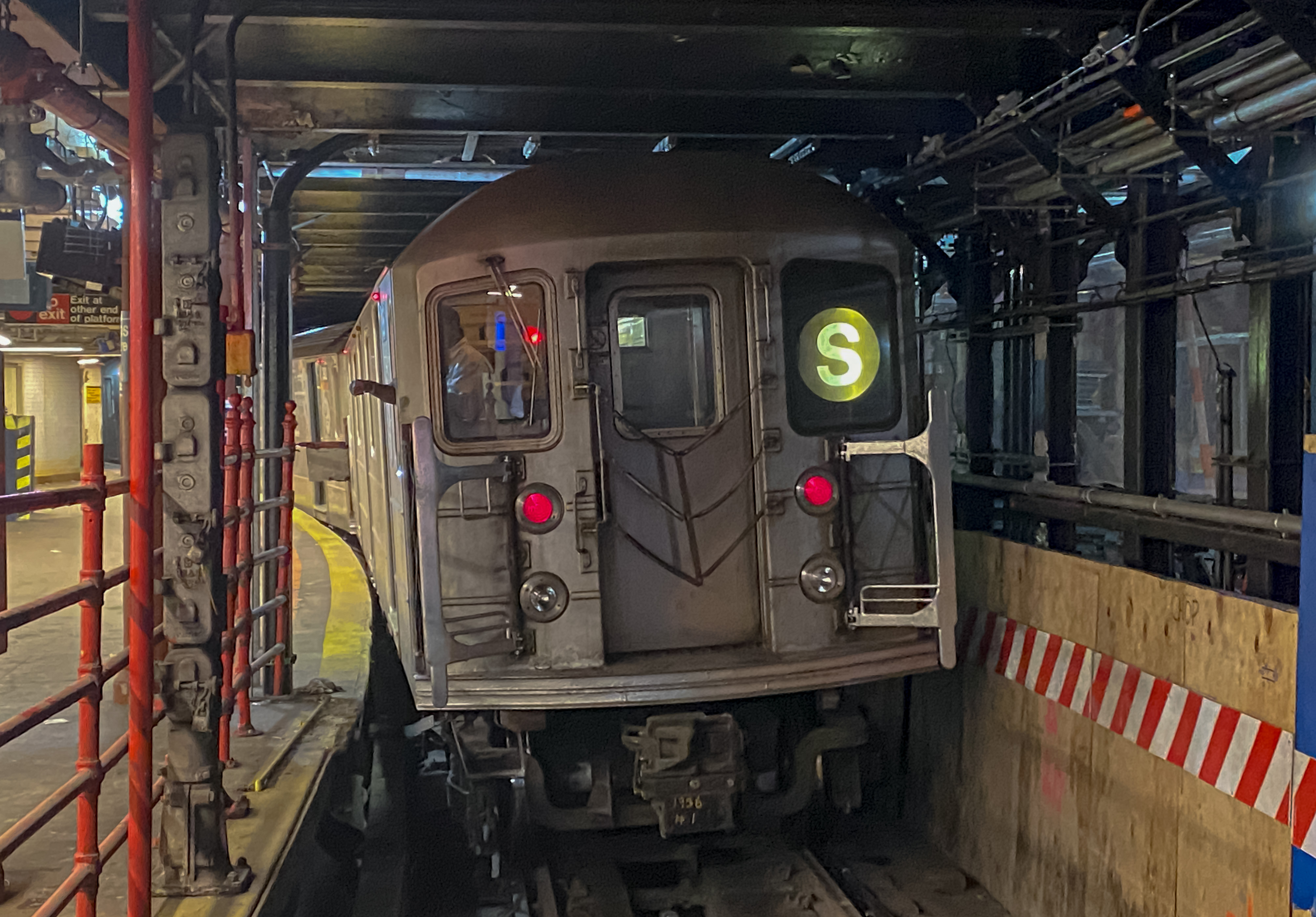
R62A 42nd Street Shuttle train at Times Square–42nd Street during reconstruction

When the IRT subway debuted in 1904, the typical tunnel construction method was cut-and-cover. The street was torn up to dig the tunnel below before being rebuilt from above. Traffic on the street above would be interrupted due to the digging up of the street. Temporary steel and wooden bridges carried surface traffic above the construction.

Contractors in this type of construction faced many obstacles, both natural and human-made. They had to deal with rock formations and groundwater, which required pumps. Twelve miles of sewers, as well as water and gas mains, electric conduits, and steam pipes had to be rerouted. Street railways had to be torn up to allow the work. The foundations of tall buildings often ran near the subway construction, and in some cases needed underpinning to ensure stability.

This method worked well for digging soft dirt and gravel near the street surface. Tunnelling shields were required for deeper sections, such as the Harlem and East River tunnels, which used cast-iron tubes. Rock or concrete-lined tunnels were used on segments from 33rd to 42nd streets under Park Avenue; 116th to 120th Streets under Broadway; 145th to Dyckman Streets (Fort George) under Broadway and St. Nicholas Avenue; and 96th Street and Broadway to Central Park North and Lenox Avenue.

About 40% of the subway system runs on surface or elevated tracks, including steel or cast-iron elevated structures, concrete viaducts, embankments, open cuts and surface routes. As of 2019, there are 168 miles (270 km) of elevated tracks. All of these construction methods are completely grade-separated from road and pedestrian crossings, and most crossings of two subway tracks are grade-separated with flying junctions. The sole exceptions of at-grade junctions of two lines in regular service are the 142nd Street and Myrtle Avenue junctions, whose tracks intersect at the same level, as well as the same-direction pairs of tracks on the IRT Eastern Parkway Line at Rogers Junction.

The 7,700 workers who built the original subway lines were mostly immigrants living in Manhattan.

More recent projects use tunnel boring machines, which increase the cost. However, they minimize disruption at street level and avoid already existing utilities. Examples of such projects include the extension of the IRT Flushing Line and the IND Second Avenue Line.

=== Expansion ===
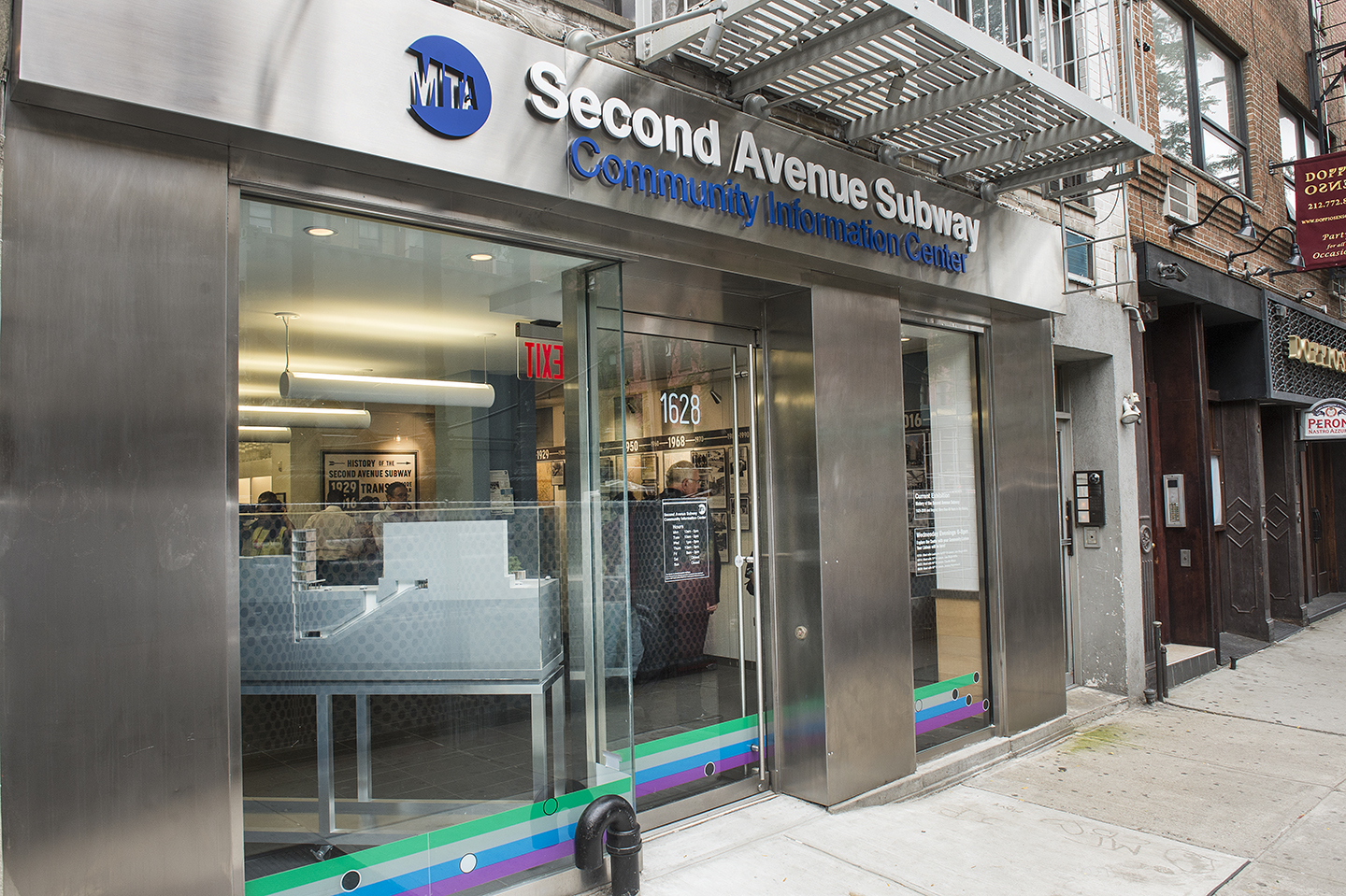
Second Avenue Subway Community Information Center

Since the opening of the original New York City Subway line in 1904, multiple official and planning agencies have proposed numerous extensions to the subway system. One of the more expansive proposals was the "IND Second System", part of a plan to construct new subway lines in addition to taking over existing subway lines and railroad rights-of-way. The most grandiose IND Second Subway plan, conceived in 1929, was to be part of the city-operated IND, and was to comprise almost 1/3 of the current subway system. By 1939, with unification planned, all three systems were included within the plan, which was ultimately never carried out. Many different plans were proposed over the years of the subway's existence, but expansion of the subway system mostly stopped during World War II.

Though most of the routes proposed over the decades have never seen construction, discussion remains strong to develop some of these lines, to alleviate existing subway capacity constraints and overcrowding, the most notable being the proposals for the Second Avenue Subway. Plans for new lines date back to the early 1910s, and expansion plans have been proposed during many years of the system's existence.

After the IND Sixth Avenue Line was completed in 1940, the city went into great debt, and only 33 new stations have been added to the system since, nineteen of which were part of defunct railways that already existed. Five stations were on the abandoned New York, Westchester and Boston Railway, which was incorporated into the system in 1941 as the IRT Dyre Avenue Line. Fourteen more stations were on the abandoned LIRR Rockaway Beach Branch (now the IND Rockaway Line), which opened in 1955. Two stations (57th Street and Grand Street) were part of the Chrystie Street Connection, and opened in 1968; the Harlem–148th Street terminal opened that same year in an unrelated project. Six more new stations were built as part of a 1968 plan: three on the Archer Avenue Lines, opened in 1988, and three on the 63rd Street Lines, opened in 1989. The new South Ferry station was built and connected to the existing Whitehall Street–South Ferry station in 2009. The one-stop 7 Subway Extension to the west side of Manhattan, consisting of the 34th Street–Hudson Yards station, was opened in 2015, (Note: There is one station (10th Avenue) planned as a future infill station. See Outcry emerges for 41st St. stop on new 7-line) and three stations on the Second Avenue Subway on the Upper East Side were opened as part of Phase 1 of the line at the beginning of 2017.

== Lines and routes ==
Annual passenger ridership
Year	Passengers	%±
1901	253,000,000	—
1905	448,000,000	+77.1%
1910	725,000,000	+61.8%
1915	830,000,000	+14.5%
1920	1,332,000,000	+60.5%
1925	1,681,000,000	+26.2%
1930	2,049,000,000	+21.9%
1935	1,817,000,000	−11.3%
1940	1,857,000,000	+2.2%
1945	1,941,000,000	+4.5%
1946	2,067,000,000	+6.5%
1950	1,681,000,000	−13.4%
1955	1,378,000,000	−18.0%
1960	1,345,000,000	−2.4%
1965	1,363,000,000	+1.3%
1970	1,258,000,000	−7.7%
1975	1,054,000,000	−16.2%
1980	1,009,000,000	−4.3%
1982	989,000,000	−2.0%
1985	1,010,000,000	+2.1%
1990	1,028,000,000	+1.8%
1995	1,093,000,000	+6.3%
2000	1,400,000,000	+28.1%
2005	1,450,000,000	+3.6%
2010	1,605,000,000	+10.7%
2011	1,640,000,000	+2.2%
2012	1,654,000,000	+0.1%
2013	1,708,000,000	+3.3%
2014	1,751,287,621	+2.6%
2015	1,762,565,419	+0.6%
2016	1,756,814,800	-0.3%
2017	1,727,366,607	-1.7%
2018	1,680,060,402	-2.7%
2019	1,697,787,002	+1.1%
2020	639,541,029	-62.3%
2021	759,976,721	+18.8%
2022	1,013,425,465	+33.3%
2023	1,151,998,158	+13.7%
2024	1,194,866,357	+3.7%
2025	1,281,883,361	+7.6%

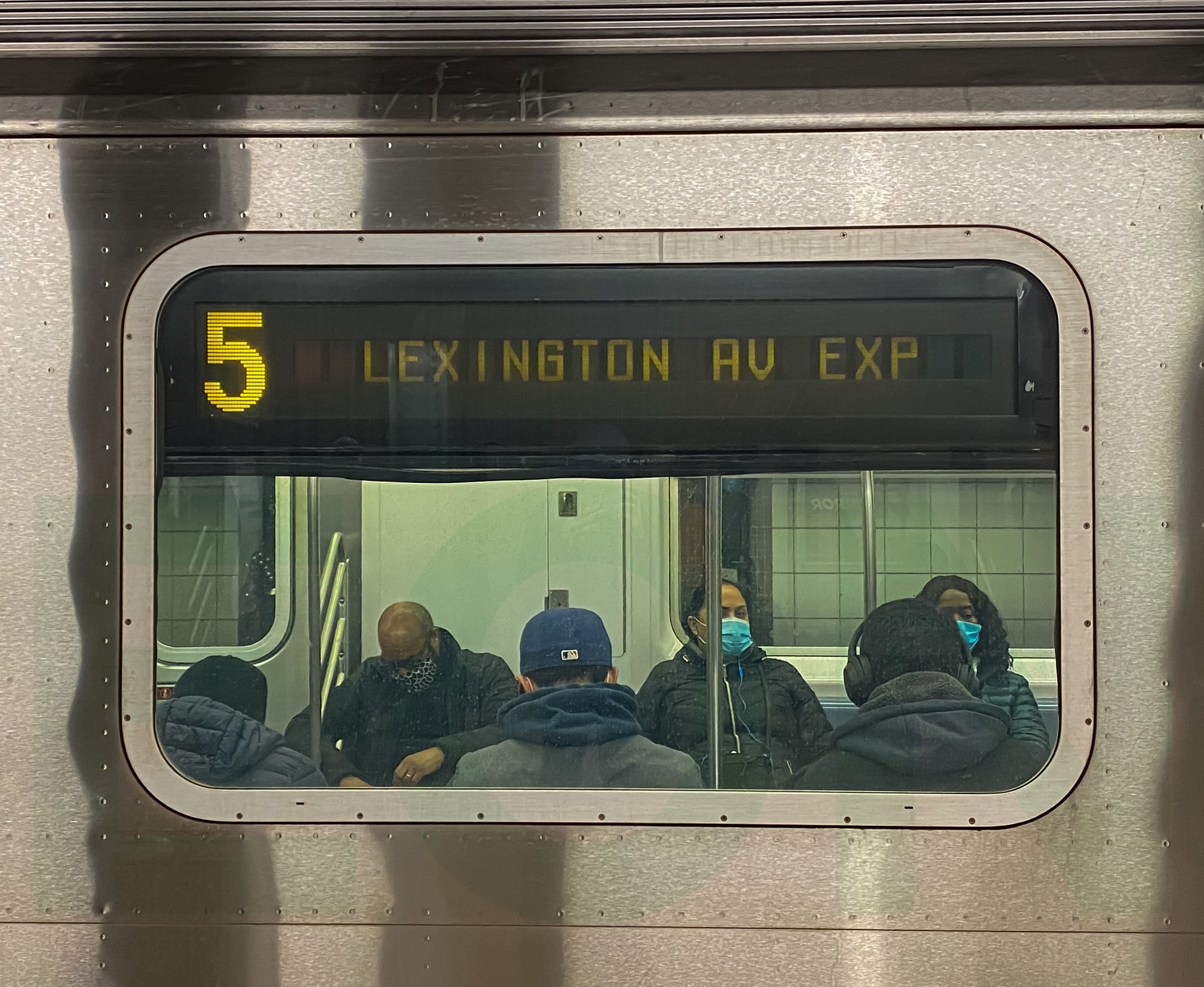
A digital sign on the side of a Bombardier R142 train on the 5

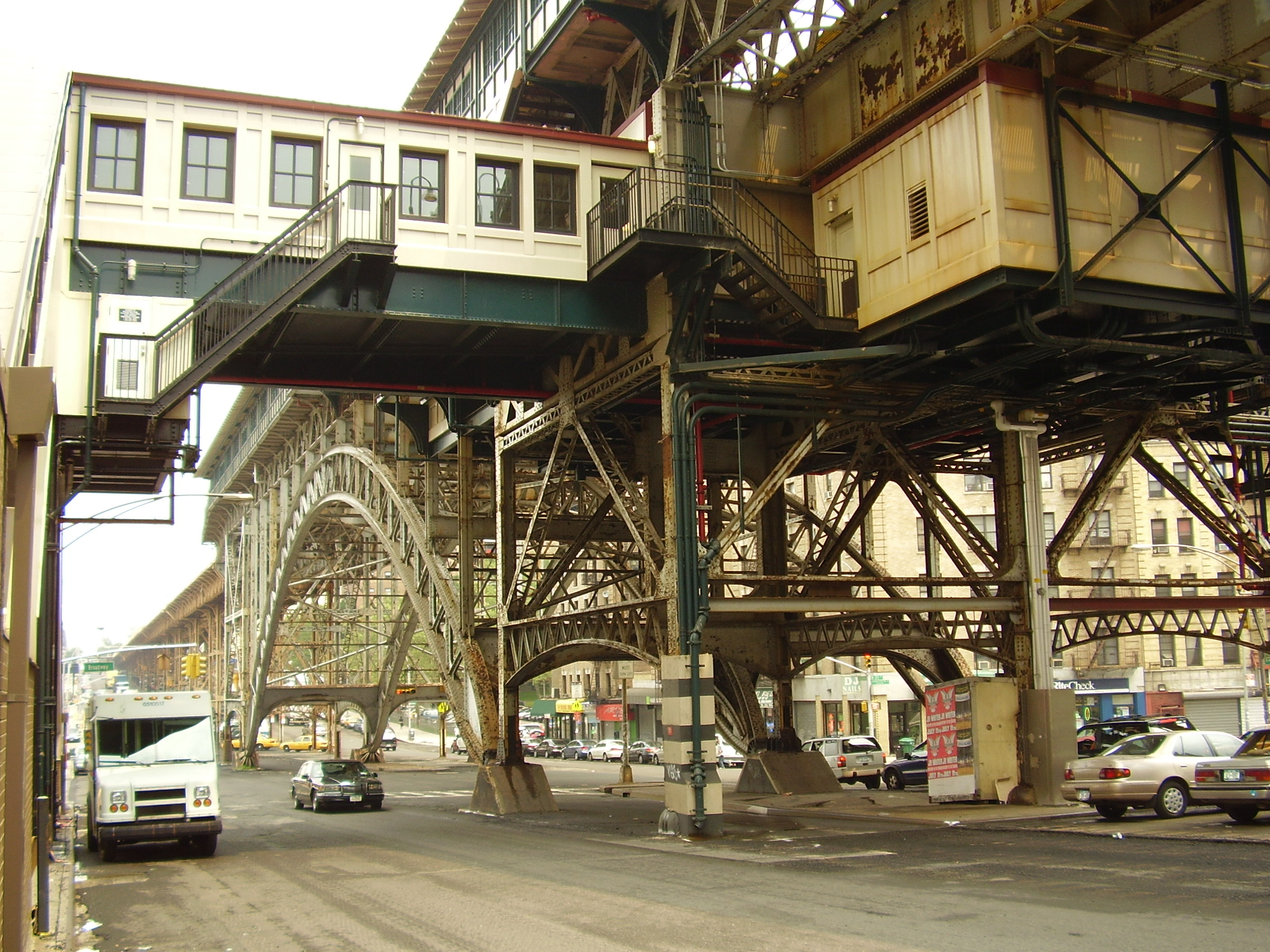
The 125th Street station on the IRT Broadway–Seventh Avenue Line in 2007

Many rapid transit systems run relatively static routings, so that a train "line" is more or less synonymous with a train "route". In New York City, routings change often, for various reasons. Within the nomenclature of the subway, the "line" describes the physical railroad track or series of tracks that a train "route" uses on its way from one terminal to another. "Routes" (also called "services") are distinguished by a letter or a number and "lines" have names. Trains display their route designation.

There are 25 train services in the subway system, including three short shuttles. Each route has a color and a local or express designation representing the Manhattan trunk line of the service. New York City residents seldom refer to services by color (e.g., "blue line" or "green line") but out-of-towners and tourists often do.

The 1, C, G, L, M, R, and W trains are fully local and make all stops. The 2, 3, 4, 5, A, B, D, E, F, N, and Q trains have portions of express and local service. J, Z, 6, and 7 trains vary by direction, day, or time of day. The letter S is used for three shuttle services: Franklin Avenue Shuttle, Rockaway Park Shuttle, and 42nd Street Shuttle.

Though the subway system operates on a 24-hour basis, during late night hours some of the designated routes do not run, run as a shorter route (often referred to as the "shuttle train" version of its full-length counterpart) or run with a different stopping pattern. These are usually indicated by smaller, secondary route signage on station platforms. Because there is no nightly system shutdown for maintenance, tracks and stations must be maintained while the system is operating. This work sometimes necessitates service changes during midday, overnight hours, and weekends. (Note: See also FASTRACK)

When parts of lines are temporarily shut down for construction purposes, the transit authority can substitute free shuttle buses (using MTA Regional Bus Operations bus fleet) to replace the routes that would normally run on these lines. The Transit Authority announces planned service changes through its website, via placards that are posted on station and interior subway-car walls, and through its Twitter page.

=== Nomenclature ===
Primary Trunk line	Color	Pantone	Hexadecimal	Service bullets
IND Eighth Avenue Line	Blue	PMS 286	#0039a6	"A" train "C" train "E" train
IND Sixth Avenue Line	Orange	PMS 165	#ff6319	"B" train "D" train "F" train "F" express train "M" train
IND Crosstown Line	Lime	PMS 376	#6cbe45	"G" train
BMT Canarsie Line	Light slate gray	50% black	#a7a9ac	"L" train
BMT Nassau Street Line	Brown	PMS 154	#996633	"J" train "Z" train
BMT Broadway Line	Yellow	PMS 116	#fccc0a	"N" train "Q" train "R" train "W" train
IRT Broadway–Seventh Avenue Line	Red	PMS 185	#ee352e	"1" train "2" train "3" train
IRT Lexington Avenue Line	Green	PMS 355	#00933c	"4" train "5" train "6" train "6" express train
IRT Flushing Line	Purple	PMS Purple	#b933ad	"7" train "7" express train
IND Second Avenue Line	Turquoise	PMS 638	#00add0	"T" train
Shuttles	Dark slate gray	70% black	#808183	shuttle train

=== Subway map ===
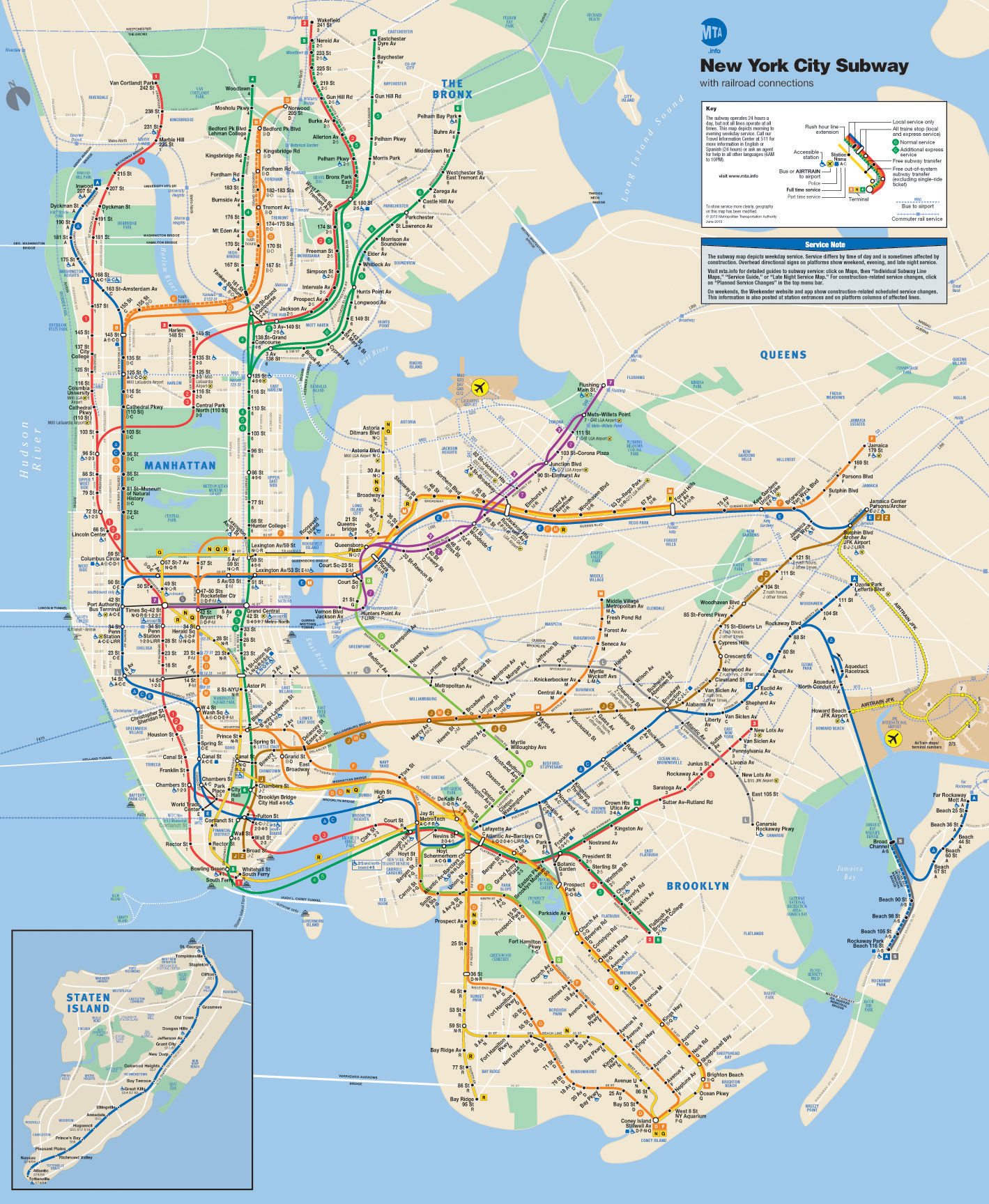
The official New York City Subway map from June 2013. This is not the current map.

Since 2025, the official transit maps of the New York City Subway have been based on a 1972 design by Massimo Vignelli. Subway routes are grouped into colors and are arranged into horizontal, vertical, and diagonal strokes. The map uses a white background, black dots for stations, and horizontal labels.

Earlier diagrams of the subway, the first being produced in 1958, had the perception of being more geographically inaccurate than the diagrams today. The first iteration of the subway map by Vignelli, published by the MTA between 1972 and 1979, has become a modern classic but the MTA deemed the map flawed due to its placement of geographical elements. In 1979, the design was replaced by one from Michael Hertz Associates, which was used until 2025. The Hertz maps are not geographically accurate due to the complexity of the system (Manhattan being the smallest borough, but having the most services), but they do show major city streets as an aid to navigation. The newest edition took effect on June 27, 2010, and makes Manhattan bigger and Staten Island smaller, with minor tweaks happening to the map when more permanent changes occur.

A late night-only version of the map was introduced on January 30, 2012. On September 16, 2011, the MTA introduced a Vignelli-style interactive subway map, "The Weekender", an online map that provides information about any planned work, from late Friday night to early Monday morning. In October 2020, the MTA launched a digital version of the map showing real-time service patterns and service changes, designed by Work & Co.

Several privately produced schematics are available online or in printed form, such as those by Hagstrom Map.

Late night subway service map

A map of line elevation in relation to the ground. Underground segments are in orange. Above-ground segments are in blue, whether they are elevated, embanked, graded or open cut.

== Stations ==
R62A 7 train arriving at Vernon Boulevard–Jackson Avenue station (43s)

Out of the 472 stations, 470 are served 24 hours a day. (Note: The Times Square and Grand Central stations of the IRT 42nd Street Shuttle are closed during late nights.) Underground stations in the New York City Subway are typically accessed by staircases going down from street level. Many of these staircases are painted in a common shade of green, with slight or significant variations in design. Other stations have unique entrances reflective of their location or date of construction. Several station entrance stairs, for example, are built into adjacent buildings. Nearly all station entrances feature color-coded globe or square lamps signifying their status as an entrance. The current number of stations is smaller than the peak of the system. In addition to the demolition of former elevated lines, which collectively have resulted in the demolition of over a hundred stations, other closed stations and unused portions of existing stations remain in parts of the system.

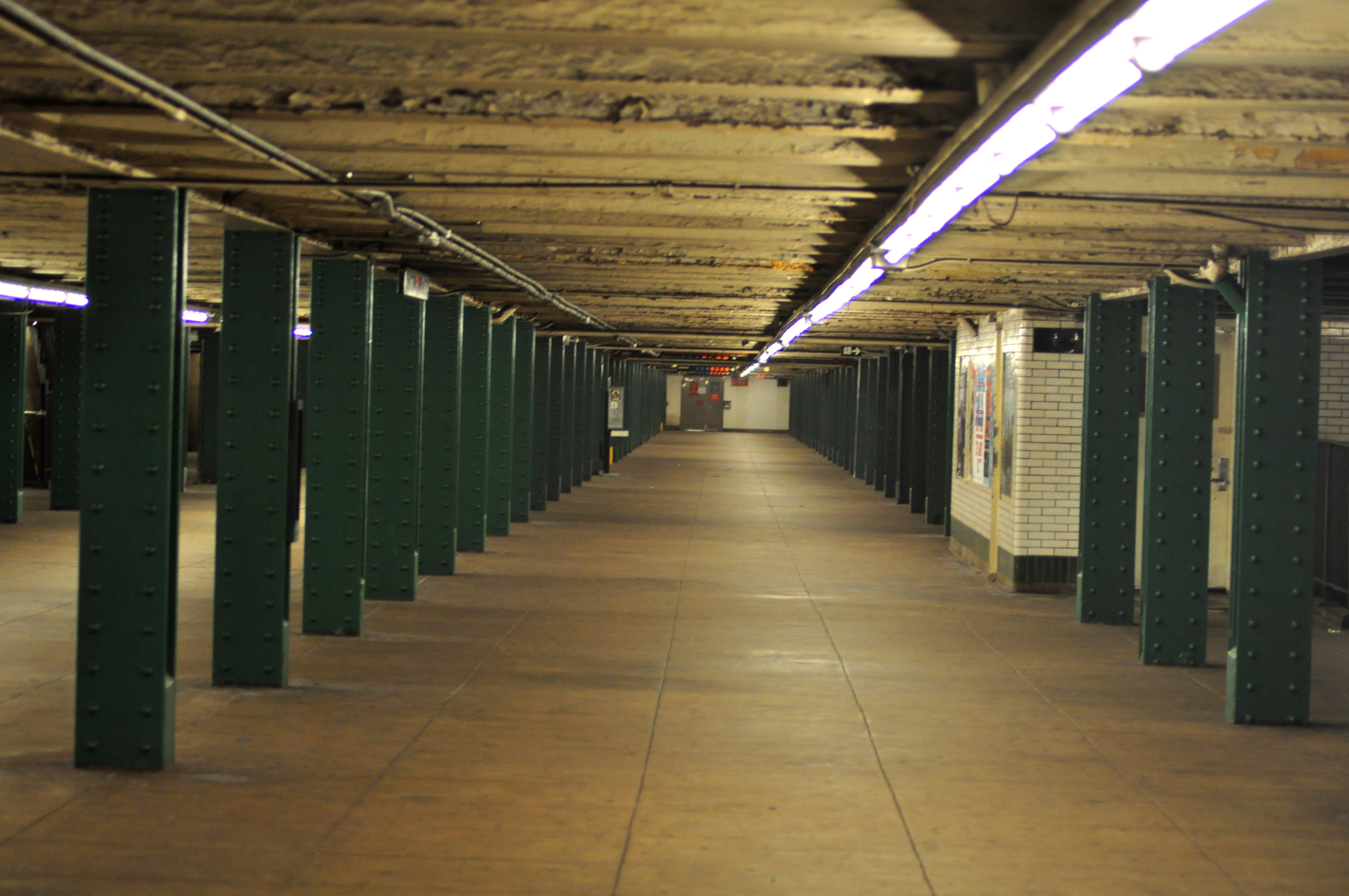
The long and wide mezzanine in the West Fourth Street station in Greenwich Village

=== Concourse ===
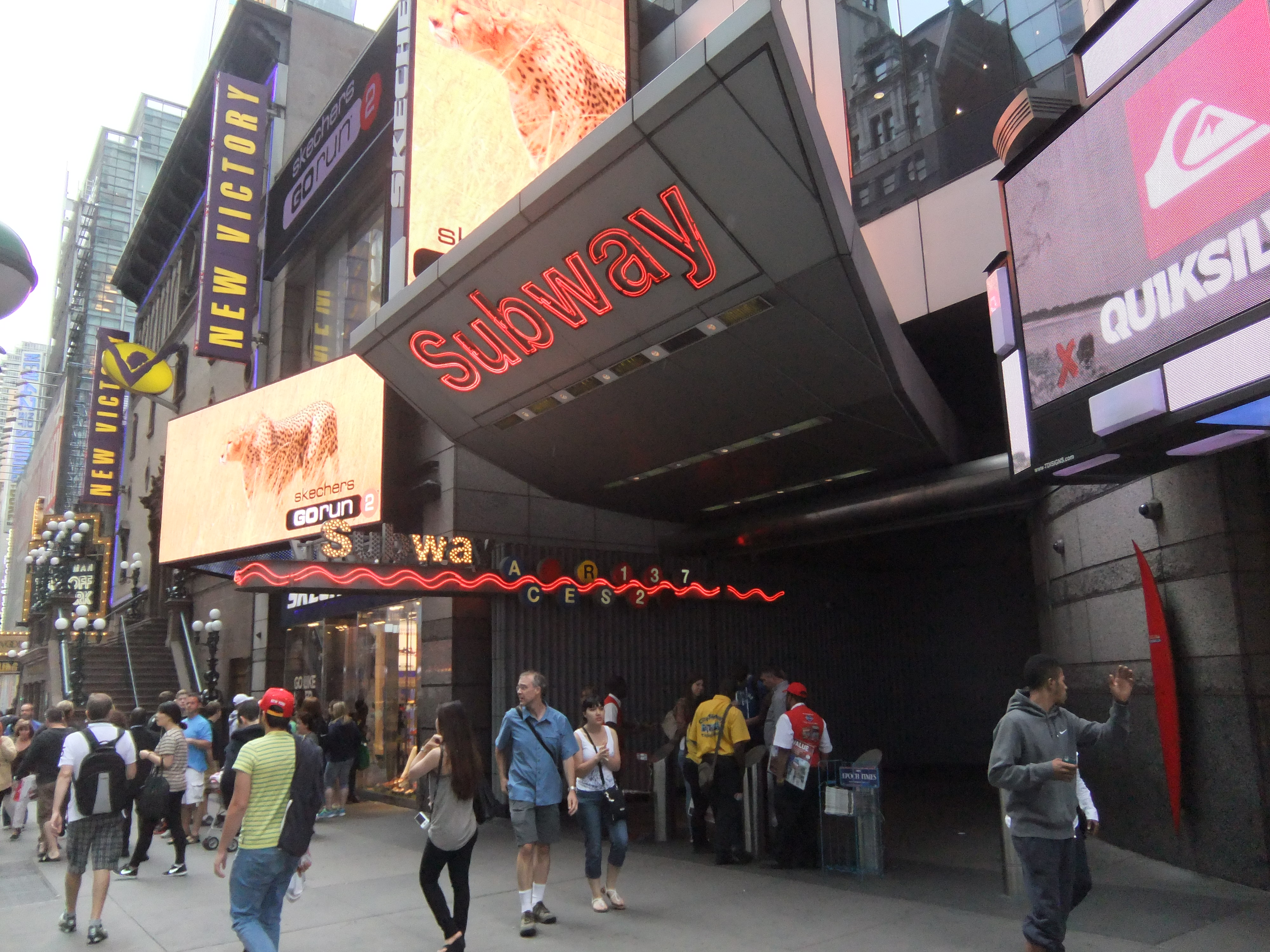
An entrance to the Times Square–42nd Street and Port Authority Bus Terminal stations

Many stations in the subway system have mezzanines. Mezzanines allow for passengers to enter from multiple locations at an intersection and proceed to the correct platform without having to cross the street before entering. Inside mezzanines are fare control areas, where passengers physically pay their fare to enter the subway system. In many older stations, the fare control area is at platform level with no mezzanine crossovers. Many side platformed elevated stations also have platform-level fare control with no common station house between directions of service.

Upon entering a station, passengers may use station booths (formerly known as token booths) or vending machines to buy their fare, which is currently stored in a MetroCard or OMNY card. Each station has at least one booth, typically located at the busiest entrance. After swiping the card at a turnstile, customers enter the fare-controlled area of the station and continue to the platforms. Inside fare control are "Off-Hours Waiting Areas", which consist of benches and are identified by a yellow sign.

Only five stations (Eastchester–Dyre Avenue, Baychester Avenue, Gun Hill Road, Pelham Parkway and Morris Park) of the whole NYC subway do not have at least a booth that is staffed 24 hours per day, seven days per week.

=== Platforms ===
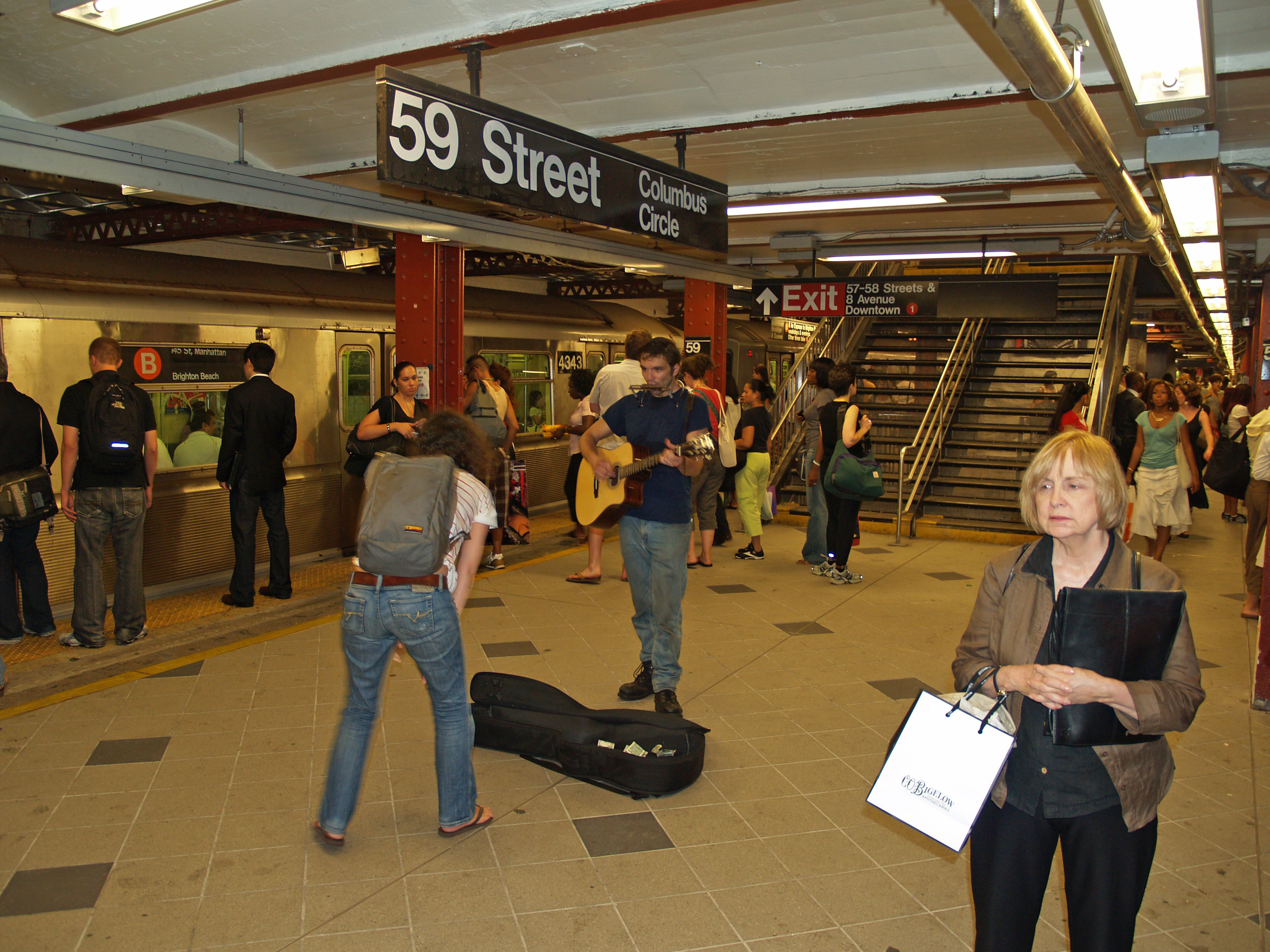
The IND Eighth Avenue Line station at 59th Street–Columbus Circle

A typical subway station has waiting platforms ranging from 480 to 600 feet (150 to 180 m) long. Some are longer. Platforms of former commuter rail stations—such as those on the IND Rockaway Line, are even longer. With the many different lines in the system, one platform often serves more than one service. Passengers need to look at the overhead signs to see which trains stop there and when, and at the arriving train to identify it.

There are several common platform configurations. On a double track line, a station may have one center island platform used for trains in both directions, or two side platforms, one for each direction. For lines with three or four tracks with express service, local stops will have side platforms and the middle one or two tracks will not stop at the station. On these lines, express stations typically have two island platforms, one for each direction. Each island platform provides a cross-platform interchange between local and express services. Some four-track lines with express service have two tracks each on two levels and use both island and side platforms.

=== Accessibility ===
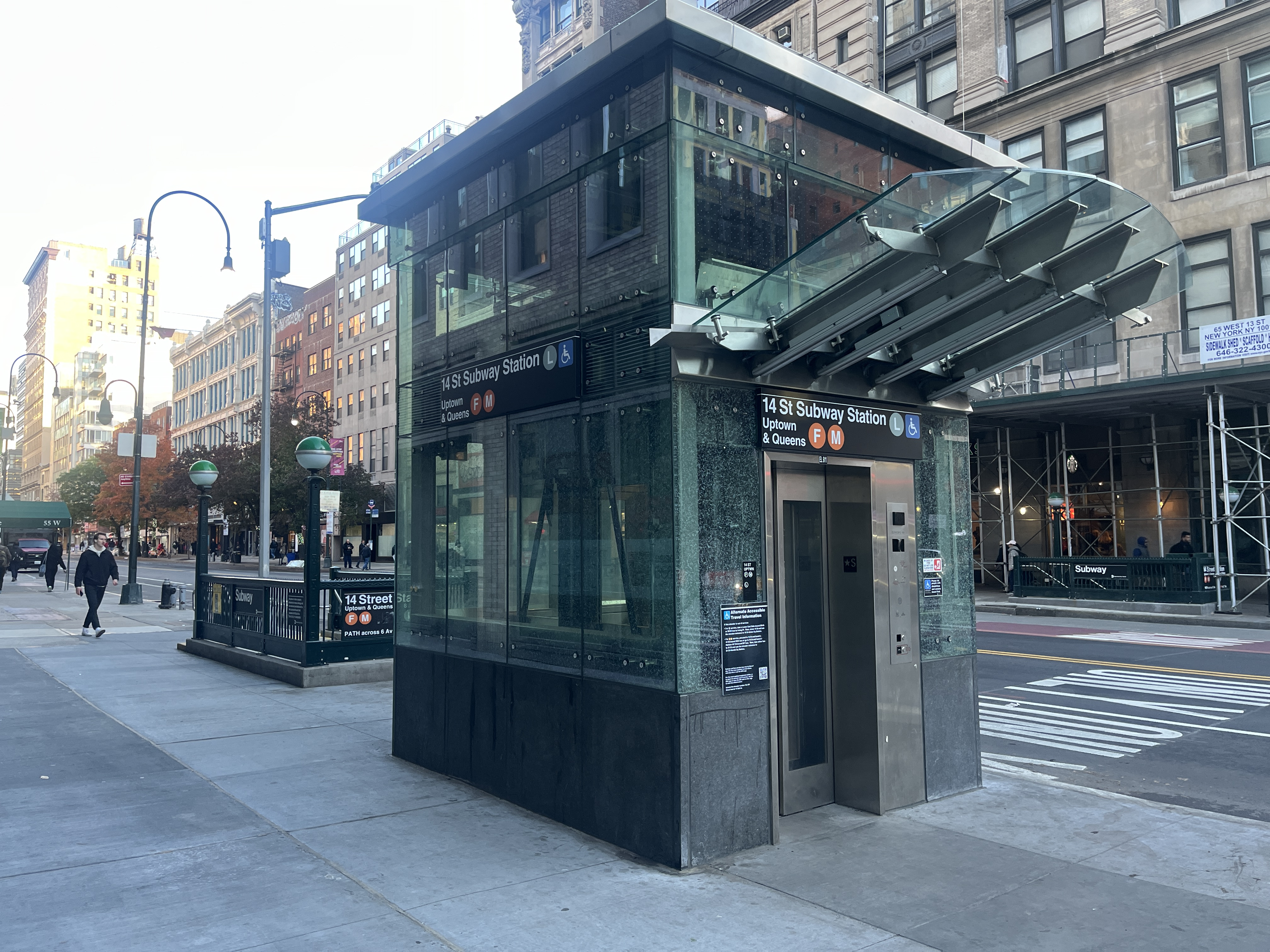
Street elevator serving as one of three accessible entrances to the 14th Street/6th Avenue station

Since the majority of the system was built before 1990, the year the Americans with Disabilities Act (ADA) went into effect, many New York City Subway stations were not designed to be accessible to all. Since then, elevators have been built in newly constructed stations to comply with the ADA. (Most grade-level stations required little modification to meet ADA standards.) Many accessible stations have AutoGate access. In addition, the MTA identified "key stations", high-traffic and/or geographically important stations, which must conform to the ADA when they are extensively renovated. Under plans from the MTA in 2016, the number of ADA accessible stations would go up to 144 by 2020. As of June 2026, there were 163 ADA-accessible stations. There are also 284 escalators in the subway system as of 2019.

Over the years, the MTA has been involved in a number of lawsuits over the lack of accessibility in its stations. The Eastern Paralyzed Veterans Association filed what may have been the first of these suits in 1979, based on state law. The lawsuits have relied on a number of different legal bases, but most have centered around the MTA's failure to include accessibility as a part of its plans for remodeling various stations. As of January 2022, ADA-accessibility projects are expected to be started or completed at 51 stations as part of the 2020–2024 Capital Program. This would allow one of every two to four stations on every line to be accessible, so that all non-accessible stops would be a maximum of two stops from an accessible station.

In 2022, the MTA agreed in a settlement to make 95 percent of subway and Staten Island Railway stations accessible by 2055. By comparison, all but one of Boston's MBTA subway stations are accessible, the Chicago "L" plans all stations to be accessible in the 2030s, the Toronto subway will be fully accessible by 2025, and Montreal Metro plans all stations to be accessible by 2038. Both the Boston and Chicago systems are as old or older than the New York City Subway, though each of these systems has fewer stations than the New York City Subway. Newer systems, such as the Washington Metro and Bay Area Rapid Transit, have been fully accessible from their opening in the 1970s.

== Rolling stock ==
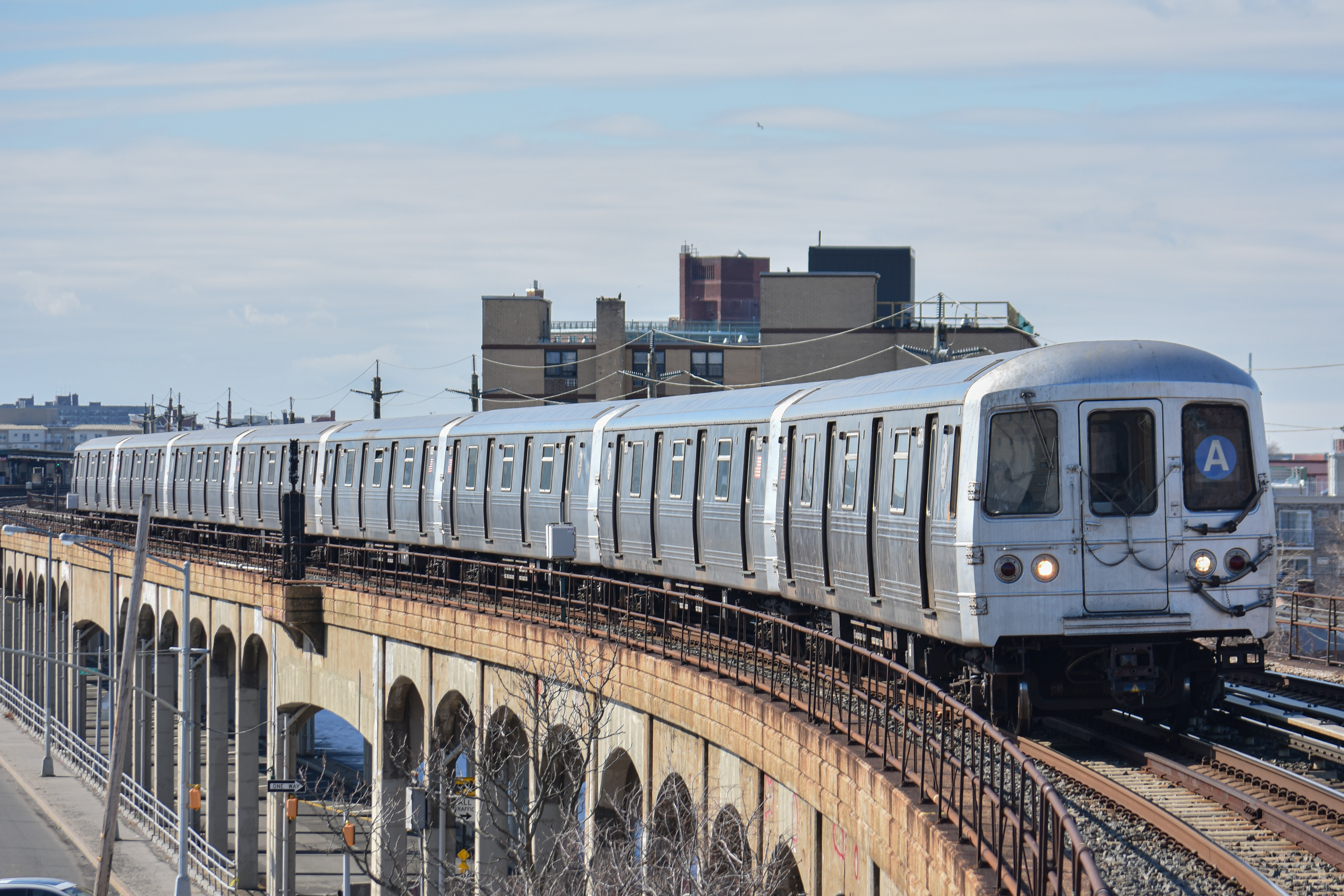
A train of R46 cars on the A train

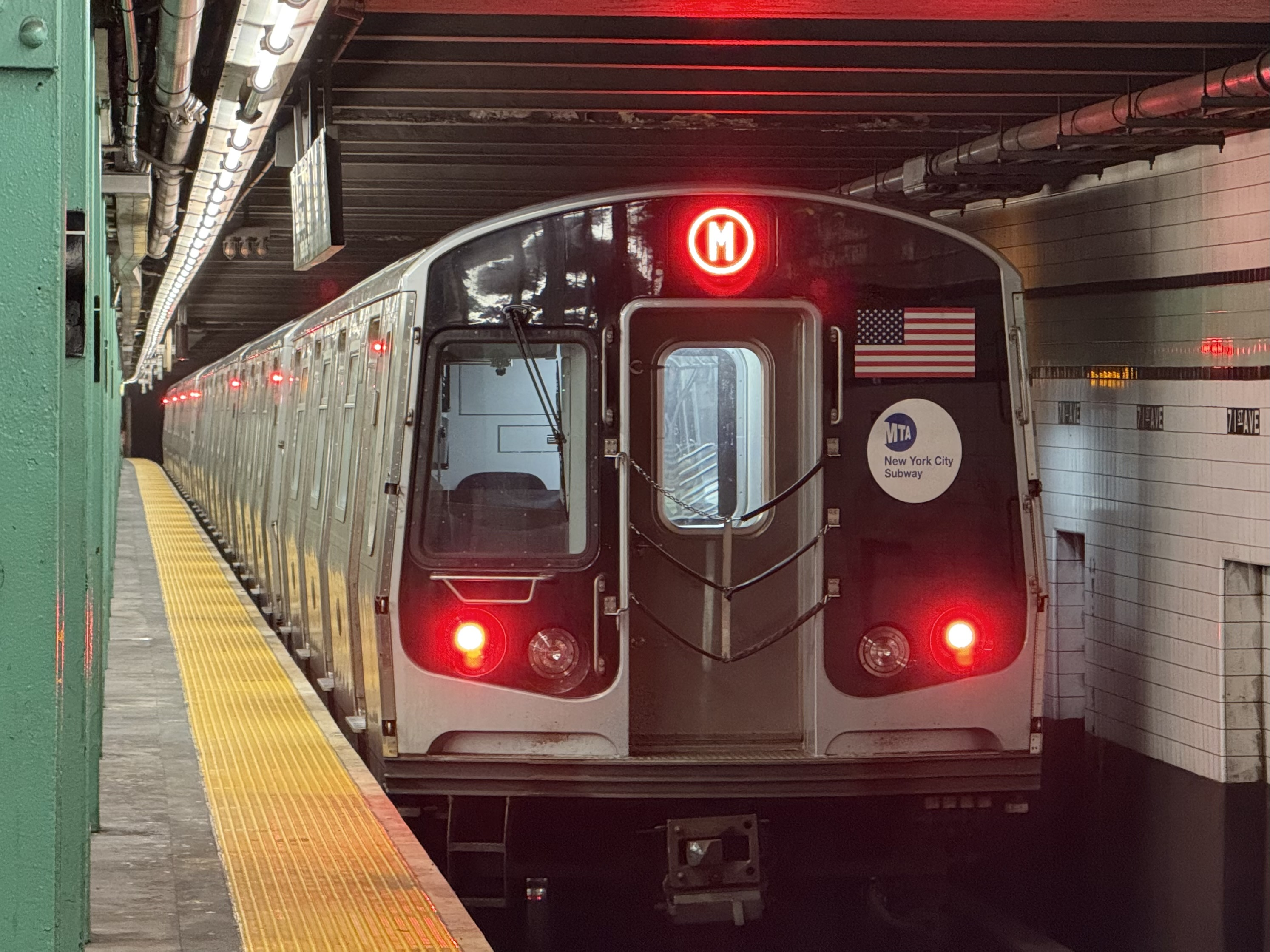
R179 train stops at Forest Hills-71 Av Station.

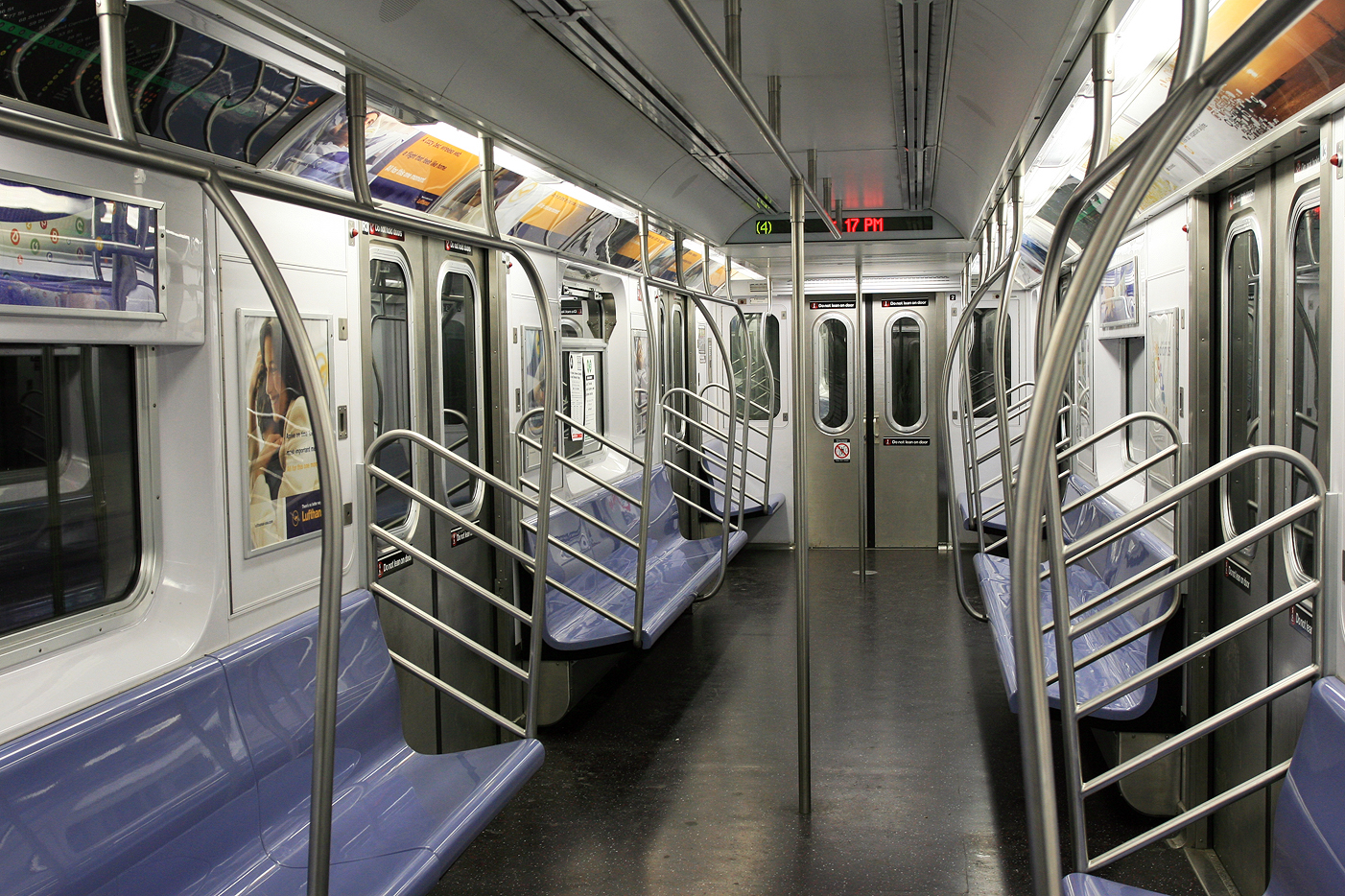
Interior of an R142A car on the 4 train

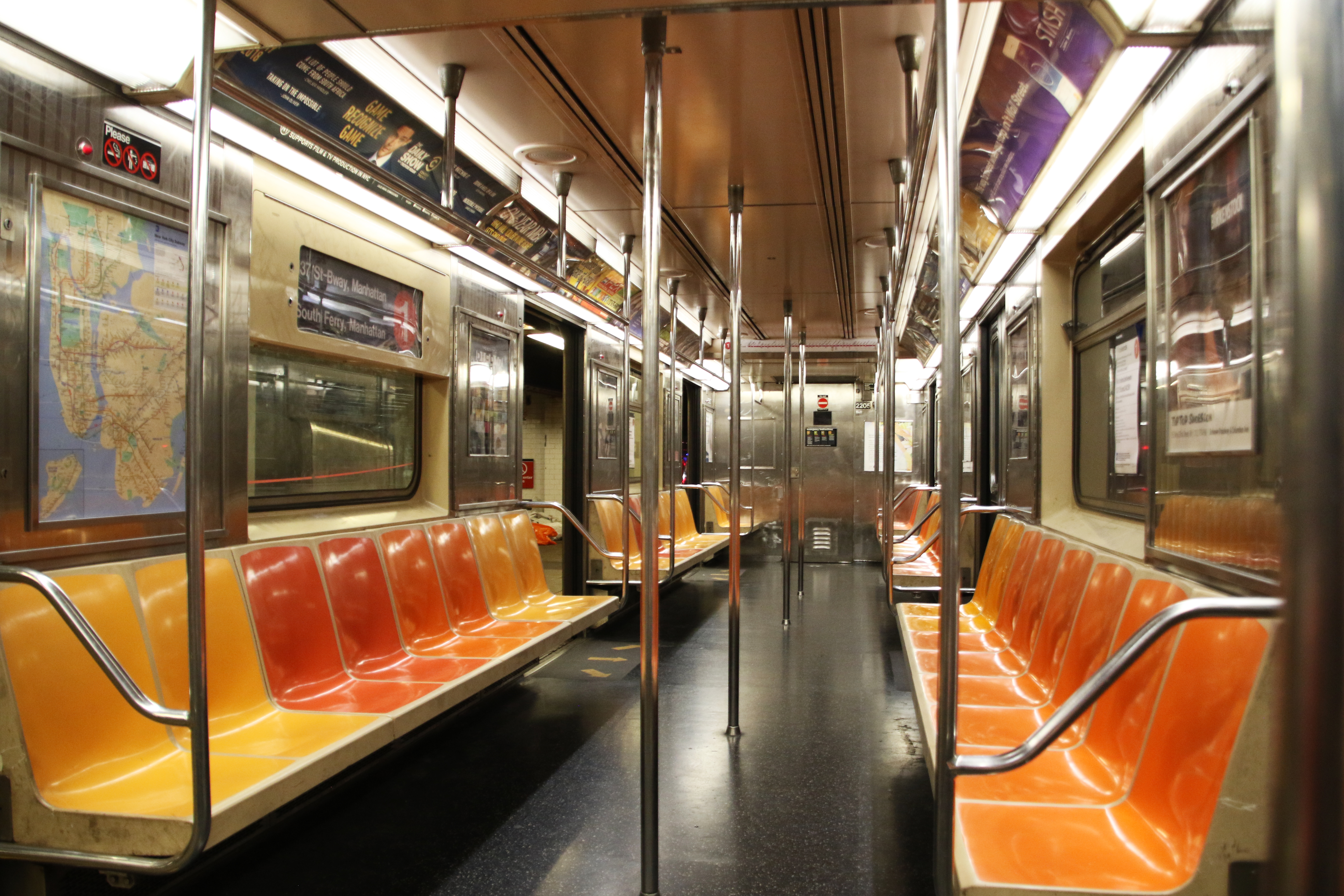
Interior of an R62A car on the 1 train

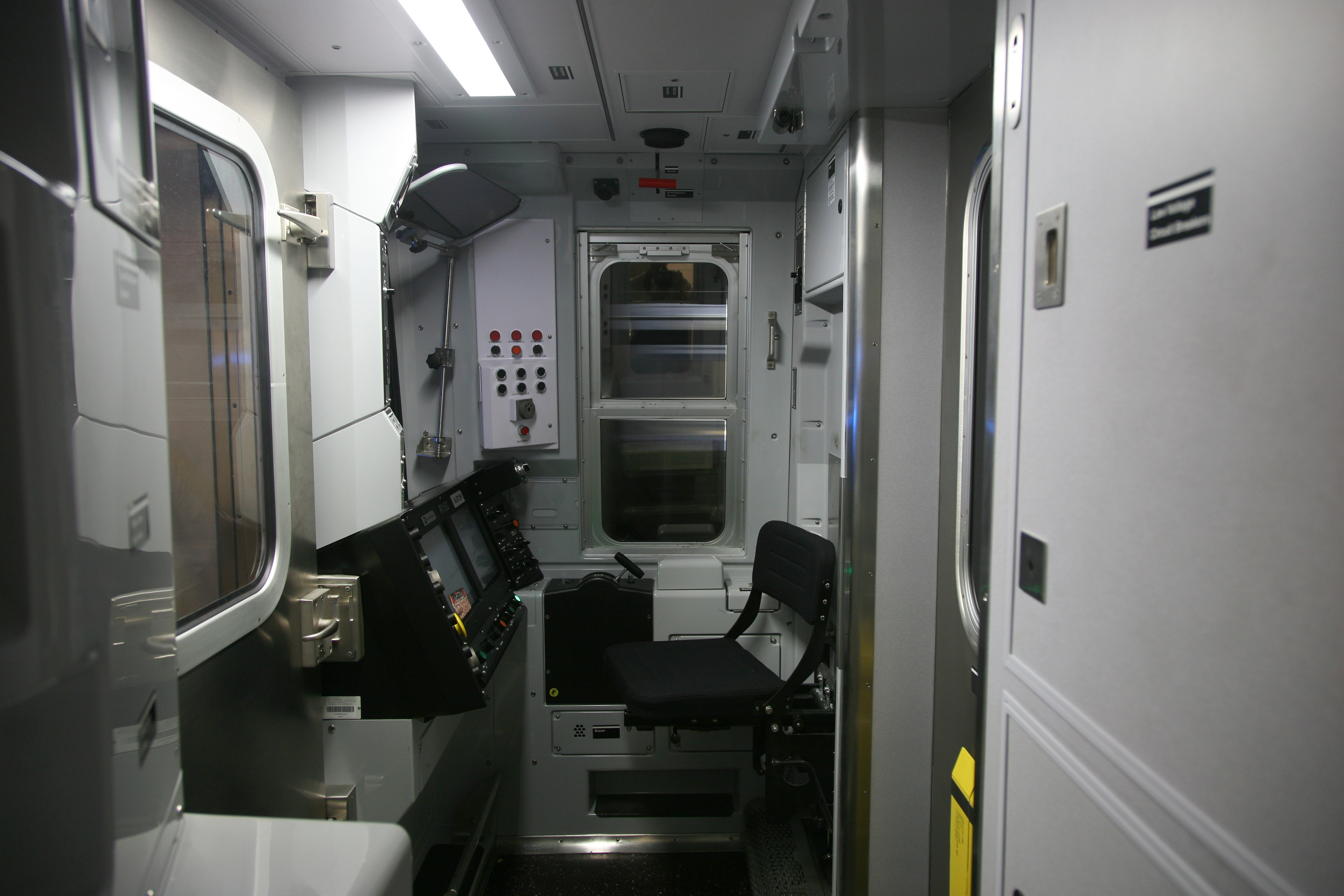
Driver's cab of an R160B subway car on the N train

In November 2016, the New York City Subway had 6712 cars on the roster. (Note: See: Korman, Joe (December 4, 2017). "IRT Car Assignments". JoeKorNer.; Korman, Joe (January 12, 2018). "BMT-IND Car Assignments". JoeKorNer.) A typical New York City Subway train consists of 8 to 11 cars, although shuttles can have as few as two, and the train can range from 150 to 600 feet (46 to 183 m) in length. The system maintains two separate fleets of cars, one for the A Division routes and another for the B Division routes. A Division equipment is approximately 8 feet 9 inches (2.67 m) wide and 51 feet 4 inches (15.65 m) long, whereas B Division equipment is about 10 feet (3.05 m) wide and either 60 feet 6 inches (18.44 m) or 75 feet (22.86 m) long. 75-foot cars cannot be used over the BMT Eastern Division in regular service due to tight turning radii on Eastern Division lines; the turning radii for curves on Eastern Division lines are as tight as 175 feet (53 m). Each train typically has two staff members on board: an operator at the front, who drives the train, and a conductor at the center, who makes announcements, assists operators, and is responsible for passenger safety and service.

Cars purchased by the City of New York since the inception of the IND and the other divisions beginning in 1948 are identified by the letter "R" followed by a number; e.g.: R32. This number is the contract number under which the cars were purchased. Cars with nearby contract numbers (e.g.: R1 through R9, or R26 through R29, or R143 through R179) may be relatively identical, despite being purchased under different contracts and possibly built by different manufacturers.

From 2000 to 2024, the R142, R142A, R143, R160, R179, R188 and R211 were placed into service. These cars are collectively known as New Technology Trains (NTTs) due to modern innovations such as information screens, recorded train announcements, and the ability to facilitate Communication-Based Train Control (CBTC).

As part of the 2017–2020 MTA Financial Plan, 600 subway cars will have electronic display signs installed to improve customer experience.

== Fares ==
Riders pay a single fare to enter the subway system and may transfer between trains at no extra cost until they exit via station turnstiles; the fare is a flat rate regardless of how far or how long the rider travels. Thus, riders must tap a contactless payment card or smartphone on an OMNY reader (or swipe a MetroCard with remaining balance) upon entering the subway system, but not a second time upon leaving.

As of December 2025, nearly all fares are paid by OMNY, and as of January 4, 2026, the base fare is $3. Reduced fares are available for the elderly and people with disabilities. In addition, there is a weekly fare cap for subways and buses; after passengers pay 12 fares with the same fare-payment medium in a 7-day period, any additional trips during the same period are free.

Fares were stored in a money room at 370 Jay Street in Downtown Brooklyn starting in 1951, when the building opened as a headquarters for the New York City Board of Transportation. The building is close to the lines of all three subway divisions (the IRT, BMT, and IND) and thus was a convenient location to collect fares, including tokens and cash, via money trains. Passageways from the subway stations, including a visible door in the Jay Street IND station, lead to a money sorting room in the basement of the building. The money trains were replaced by armored trucks in 2006.

=== MetroCard ===
The final MetroCard design before its discontinuation

In June 1993, a fare system called the MetroCard was introduced, which allows riders to use magnetic stripe cards that store the value equal to the amount paid to a subway station booth clerk or vending machine. The MetroCard was enhanced in 1997 to allow passengers to make free transfers between subways and buses within two hours and several MetroCard-only transfers between subway stations were added in 2001. With the addition of unlimited-ride MetroCards in 1998, the New York City Transit system was the last major transit system in the United States with the exception of BART in San Francisco to introduce passes for unlimited bus and rapid transit travel. MetroCard sales ended December 31, 2025, although existing MetroCards could continue to be used until their balance was depleted or the card expired.

=== OMNY ===
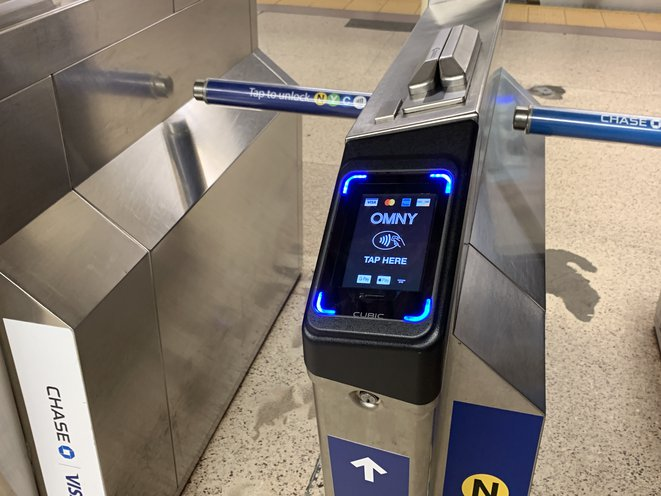
OMNY replaced the MetroCard.

On October 23, 2017, it was announced that the MetroCard would be phased out and replaced by OMNY, a contactless fare payment system by San Diego-based Cubic Transportation Systems, with fare payment being made using Apple Pay, Google Pay, debit/credit cards with near-field communication technology, or radio-frequency identification cards. OMNY was available on all MTA buses and at all subway stations by December 31, 2020.

== Modernization ==
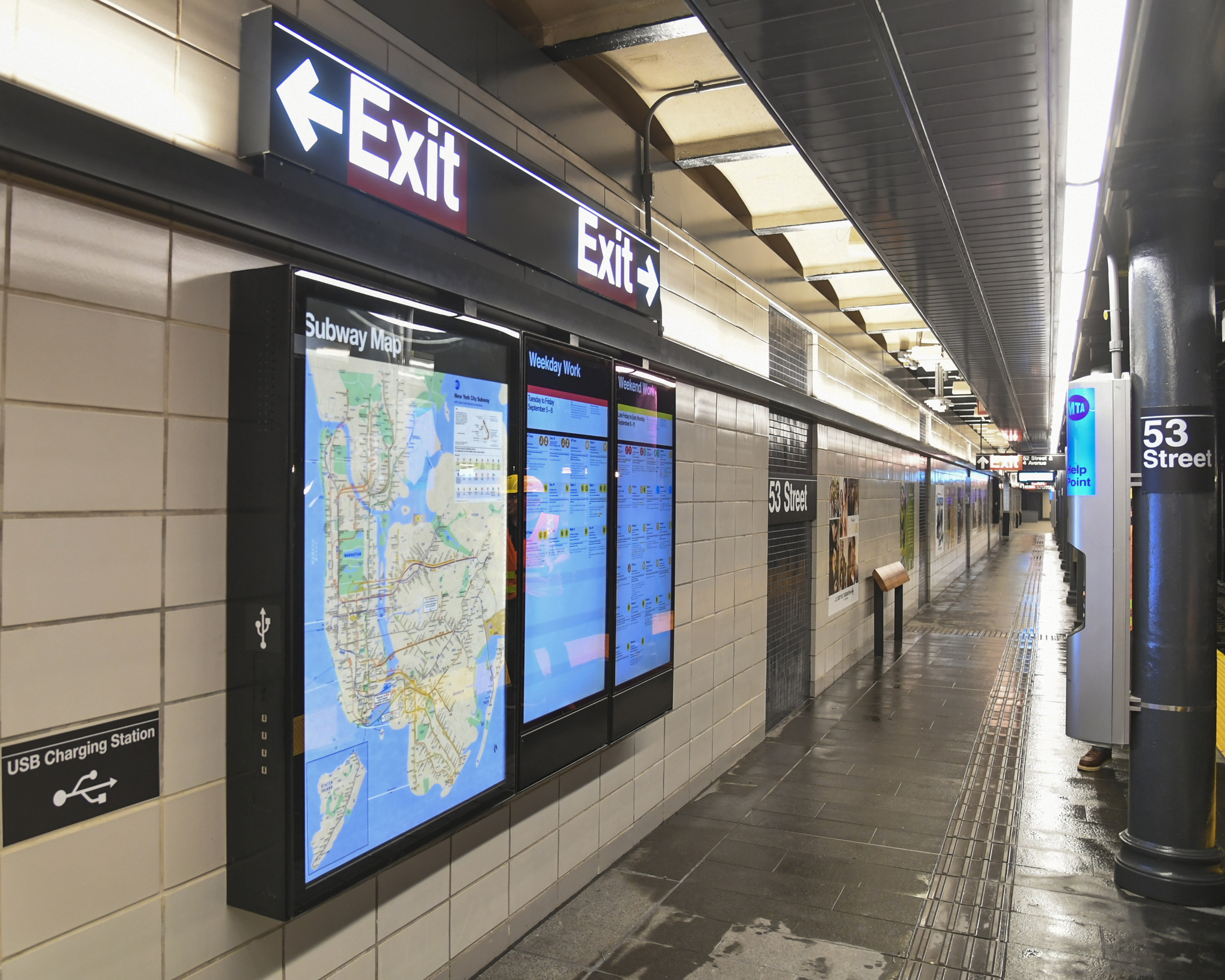
A subway station rebuilt under the Enhanced Station Initiative

Since the late 20th century, the MTA has started several projects to maintain and improve the subway. In the 1990s, it started converting the BMT Canarsie Line to use communications-based train control, utilizing a moving block signal system that allowed more trains to use the tracks and thus increasing passenger capacity. After the Canarsie Line tests were successful, the MTA expanded the automation program in the 2000s and 2010s to include other lines. As part of another program called FASTRACK, the MTA started closing sections of lines during weekday nights in 2012, in order to allow workers to clean these lines without being hindered by train movements. It expanded the program beyond Manhattan the next year after noticing how efficient the FASTRACK program was compared to previous service diversions. In 2015, the MTA announced a wide-ranging improvement program as part of the 2015–2019 Capital Program. Thirty stations would be extensively rebuilt under the Enhanced Station Initiative, and new R211 subway cars would be able to fit more passengers.

The MTA has also started some projects to improve passenger amenities. It added train arrival "countdown clocks" to most A Division stations (except on the IRT Flushing Line, serving the 7 and <7> trains) and the BMT Canarsie Line (L train) by late 2011, allowing passengers on these routes to see train arrival times using real-time data. A similar countdown-clock project for the B Division and the Flushing Line was deferred until 2016, when a new Bluetooth-based clock system was tested successfully. Beginning in 2011, the MTA also started "Help Point" to aid with emergency calls or station agent assistance. The Help Point project was deemed successful, and the MTA subsequently installed Help Points in all stations. Interactive touchscreen "On The Go! Travel Station" kiosks, which give station advisories, itineraries, and timetables, were installed starting in 2011, with the program also being expanded after a successful pilot. Cellular phone and wireless data in stations, first installed in 2011 as part of yet another pilot program, was also expanded systemwide due to positive passenger feedback. Finally, credit-card trials at several subway stations in 2006 and 2010 led to proposals for contactless payment to replace the aging MetroCard.

== Safety and security ==
=== Signaling ===
Signaling has evolved during a century of operation, and MTA uses a mixture of old and new systems. Most routes use block signaling but a few routes are also being retrofitted with communications-based train control (CBTC), which would allow trains to run without train operator input.

==== Wayside block signaling ====
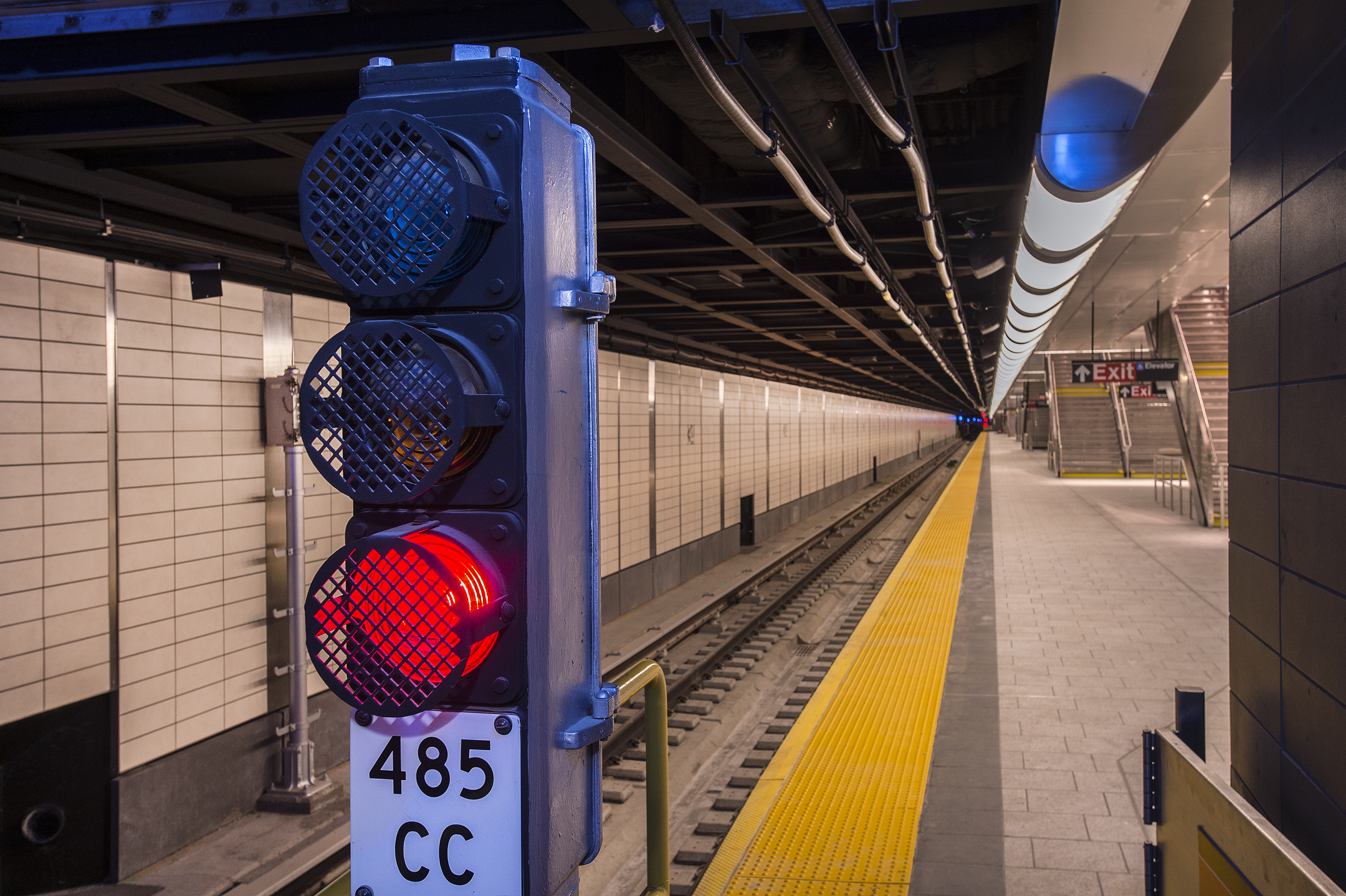
Example of a wayside block signal at the 34th Street–Hudson Yards station

The system currently uses automatic block signaling with fixed wayside signals and automatic train stops to provide safe train operation across the whole system. The New York City Subway system has, for the most part, used block signaling since its first line opened, and many portions of the current signaling system were installed between the 1930s and 1960s. These signals work by preventing trains from entering a "block" occupied by another train. Typically, the blocks are 1,000 feet (300 m) long. Red and green lights show whether a block is occupied or vacant. The train's maximum speed will depend on how many blocks are open in front of it. The signals do not register a train's speed, nor where in the block the train is located.

Subway trains are stopped mechanically at all signals showing "stop". To make train stops safe and effective, wayside trippers must not be moved to trip ("stop") position until the train has fully passed.

==== Communications-based train control ====
In the late 1990s and early 2000s, the MTA began automating the subway by installing CBTC, which supplements rather than replaces the fixed-block signal system; it allows trains to operate more closely together with lower headways. The BMT Canarsie Line, on which the L train runs, was chosen for pilot testing because it is a self-contained line that does not operate in conjunction with other lines. CBTC became operational in February 2009. Due to an unexpected ridership increase, the MTA ordered additional cars, and increased service from 15 trains to 26 trains per hour, an achievement beyond the capability of the block system. The total cost of the project was $340 million.

After the success of the BMT Canarsie Line automation, the IRT Flushing Line, carrying the 7 and <7> trains, was next chosen to get CBTC. Estimated to cost US$1.4 billion, the project was completed in November 2018. By 2018, CBTC was in the process of being installed on several other routes as well, particularly the IND Queens Boulevard Line (E, F, <F>, M, and R trains) and IND Culver Line (F, <F>, and G trains). The total cost for the entire Queens Boulevard Line is estimated at over $900 million, and the Queens Boulevard CBTC project was completed in 2022. Funding for CBTC on the IND Eighth Avenue Line is also provided in the 2015–2019 capital plan, and the IND Crosstown Line and IND Fulton Street Line were also being equipped with CBTC as of 2022. The widespread installation of CBTC includes retrofitting many newer subway cars and replacement of older cars.

Eventually, the MTA has plans to automate a much larger portion, using One Person Train Operation (OPTO) in conjunction with CBTC. At the current pace of installation, it would take 175 years for CBTC to be installed at a cost of $20 billion. The Flushing line operated at almost 30 trains an hour using the signal system installed when the line was built, but after the CBTC installation it became possible that an additional two trains per hour could be operated. In March 2018, New York City Transit Authority president Andy Byford announced a new plan for resignaling the subway with CBTC, which would only take 10 to 15 years, compared to the previous estimate of 40 years. This would cost $8 to $15 billion.

The New York City Subway uses a system known as Automatic Train Supervision (ATS) for dispatching and train routing on the A Division (the Flushing line and the trains used on the 7 and <7> services do not have ATS.) ATS allows dispatchers in the Operations Control Center (OCC) to see where trains are in real time, and whether each individual train is running early or late. Dispatchers can hold trains for connections, re-route trains, or short-turn trains to provide better service when a disruption causes delays.

=== Train accidents ===
Despite the signal system, there have been at least 64 major train accidents since 1918, when a train bound for South Ferry collided with two trains halted near Jackson Avenue on the IRT White Plains Road Line in the Bronx. Several accidents resulted when the train operator ran through red signals and rear-ended the subway train in front of it; this resulted from the signaling practice of "keying by", which allowed train operators to bypass red signals. The deadliest accident, the Malbone Street Wreck, occurred on November 1, 1918, beneath the intersection of Flatbush Avenue, Ocean Avenue, and Malbone Street (the latter of which is now Empire Boulevard) near the Prospect Park station of the then-BRT Brighton Line in Brooklyn, killing 93 people. As a result of accidents, especially more recent ones such as the 1995 Williamsburg Bridge crash, timer signals were installed. These signals have resulted in reduced speeds across the system. Accidents such as derailments are also due to broken equipment, such as the rails and the train itself.

=== Passenger safety ===
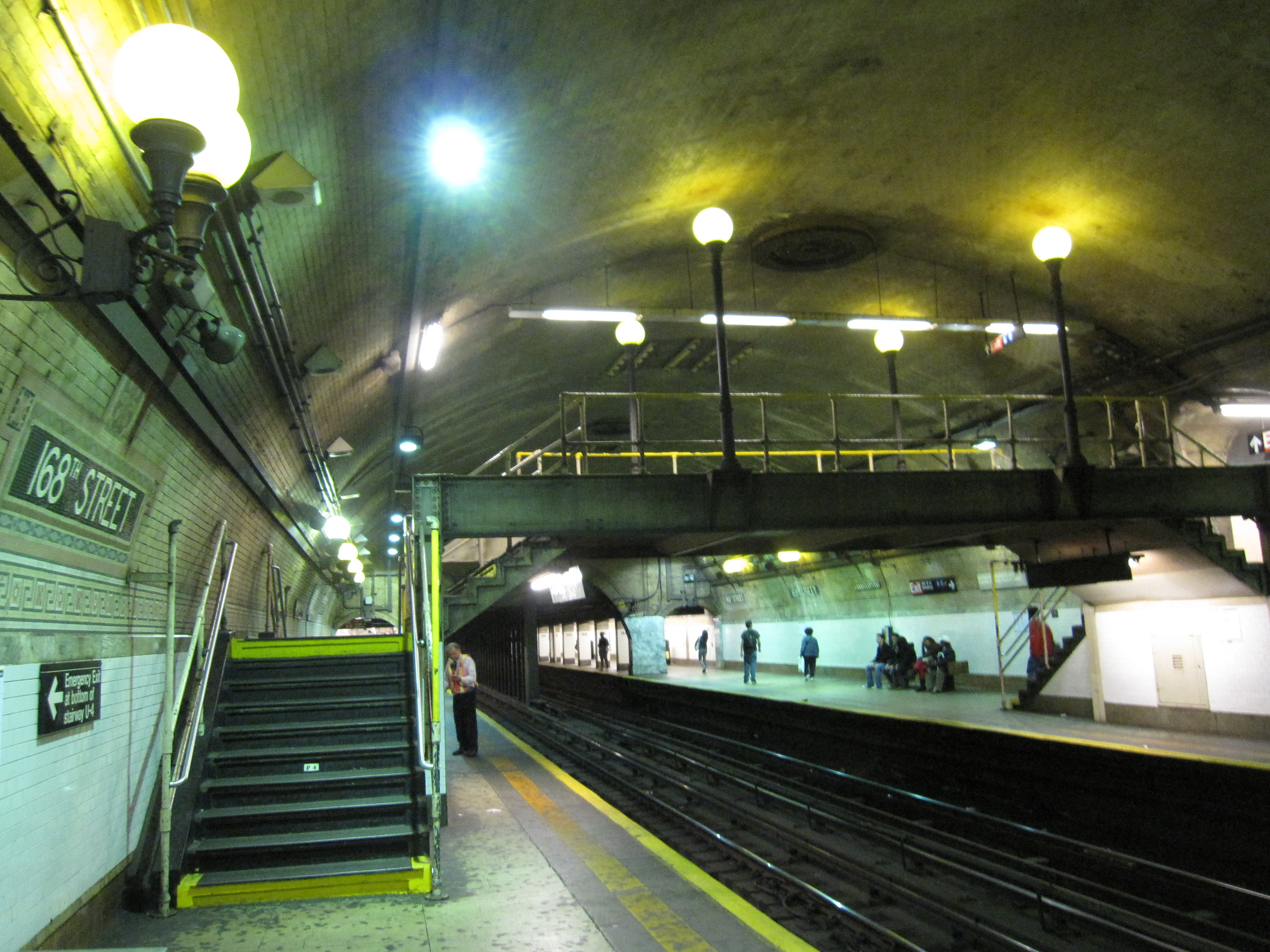
Yellow platform edges, yellow staircase steps and yellow railings, painted for safety, at the IRT Broadway–Seventh Avenue Line platform at 168th Street

==== Track safety and suicides ====
A portion of subway-related deaths in New York consists of suicides committed by jumping in front of an oncoming train. Between 1990 and 2003, 343 subway-related suicides were registered out of a citywide total of 7,394 (4.6%) and subway-related suicides increased by 30%, despite a decline in overall suicide numbers.

Due to increase in people hit by trains in 2013, in late 2013 and early 2014 the MTA started a test program, with four systems installed and strategies instituted to eliminate the number of people hit by trains. Closed-circuit television cameras, a web of laser beams stretched across the tracks, radio frequencies transmitted across the tracks, and thermal imaging cameras focused on the station's tracks were installed. The tests were successful enough that the 2015–2019 capital program included similar installations system-wide.

The MTA also expressed interest in starting a pilot program to install platform edge doors. Several planned stations in the New York City Subway may possibly feature platform screen doors, including at future stations such as those part of the Second Avenue Subway. In October 2017, it was announced that as part of a pilot program, the Third Avenue station would be refitted with platform screen doors during the 14th Street Tunnel shutdown in 2019–2020. The $30 million for the platform edge door pilot program was diverted to another project in 2018. Following a series of incidents, MTA announced another PSD pilot program at three stations in February 2022: the 7 and <7> trains' platform at Times Square, the E train's platform at Sutphin Boulevard–Archer Avenue–JFK Airport, and the Third Avenue station. Numerous challenges come with platform doors. Some subway lines operate multiple subway car models, and their doors do not align. Many platforms are not strong enough to hold the additional weight of platform barriers, thus requiring major renovations if they were to be installed.

Stopgap measures adopted to mitigate the problem have included metal barriers that have been installed in 158 stations as of June 2026.

Fatalities in New York City Subway collisions (2021–2025)
	2021	2022	2023	2024	2025
Suicide	29	29	33	34	18
Other	40	54	67	67	72
Total	69	83	100	101	90

==== Crime ====
Crime rates have varied, but there was a downward trend from the 1990s to 2014. To fight crime, various approaches have been used over the years, including an "If You See Something, Say Something" campaign and, starting in 2016, banning people who commit a crime in the subway system from entering the system for a certain length of time.

In July 1985, the Citizens Crime Commission of New York City published a study showing riders abandoning the subway, fearing the frequent robberies and generally bad circumstances. Crime rates in the subway and the city dropped in 1993, part of a larger citywide decrease in crime. Michael Bloomberg stated in a November 2004 press release: "Today, the subway system is safer than it has been at any time since we started tabulating subway crime statistics nearly 40 years ago." Although ridership decreased by 40 percent from 2019 to 2022, the number of crimes in the system remained roughly the same, prompting riders to express concerns over increased crime. The subway recorded eight murders in 2021, the highest annual total in 25 years; by October 2022, nine people had been murdered that year alone.

The subway system has been the target of some mass attacks, though such attacks are relatively rare. On December 11, 2017, there was an attempted bombing at the Times Square–42nd Street station, injuring four people including the attacker. On April 12, 2022, a shooting attack occurred on the N train, injuring 29 people including 10 who were shot.

Since January 2025, two NYPD officers have patrolled each train between 9 p.m. and the following day at 5 a.m. The officers move from car to car each time whenever the train pulls into a station. By the early 2020s, people (primarily teenagers) were increasingly participating in a trend of vandalism and train surfing, using skeleton keys to illegally enter train cabs and tamper with equipment. On several occasions, trains have been moved illegally. Following many reports and complaints of vandalism, the MTA added cameras and enhanced locks to hundreds of cars.

==== Photography ====
After the September 11, 2001, attacks, the MTA exercised extreme caution regarding anyone taking photographs or recording video inside the system and proposed banning all photography and recording in a meeting around June 2004. Due to strong response from both the public and from civil rights groups, the rule of conduct was dropped. In November 2004, the MTA again put this rule up for approval, but was again denied, though many police officers and transit workers still confront or harass people taking photographs or videos. On April 3, 2009, the NYPD issued a directive to officers stating that it is legal to take pictures within the subway system so long as it is not accompanied with suspicious activity.

As of 2021, the MTA Rules of Conduct, Restricted Areas and Activities section states that anyone may take pictures or record videos, provided that they do not use any of three tools: lights, reflectors, or tripods. These three tools are permitted only by members of the press who have identification issued by the NYPD.

==== Terrorism prevention ====
On July 22, 2005, in response to bombings in London, the New York City Police Department introduced a new policy of randomly searching passengers' bags as they approached turnstiles. The NYPD claimed that no form of racial profiling would be conducted when these searches actually took place. The NYPD has come under fire from some groups that claim purely random searches without any form of threat assessment would be ineffectual. Donna Lieberman, executive director of the NYCLU, stated, "This NYPD bag search policy is unprecedented, unlawful and ineffective. It is essential that police be aggressive in maintaining security in public transportation. But our very real concerns about terrorism do not justify the NYPD subjecting millions of innocent people to suspicionless searches in a way that does not identify any person seeking to engage in terrorist activity and is unlikely to have any meaningful deterrent effect on terrorist activity." The searches were upheld by the United States Court of Appeals for the Second Circuit in MacWade v. Kelly.

On April 11, 2008, MTA received a Ferrara Fire Apparatus Hazardous Materials Response Truck, which went into service three days later. It will be used in the case of a chemical or bioterrorist attack.

Najibullah Zazi and others were arrested in September 2009 and pleaded guilty in 2010 to being part of an al-Qaeda plan to undertake suicide bombings on the New York City Subway system.

== Challenges ==
=== 2009–2010 budget cuts ===
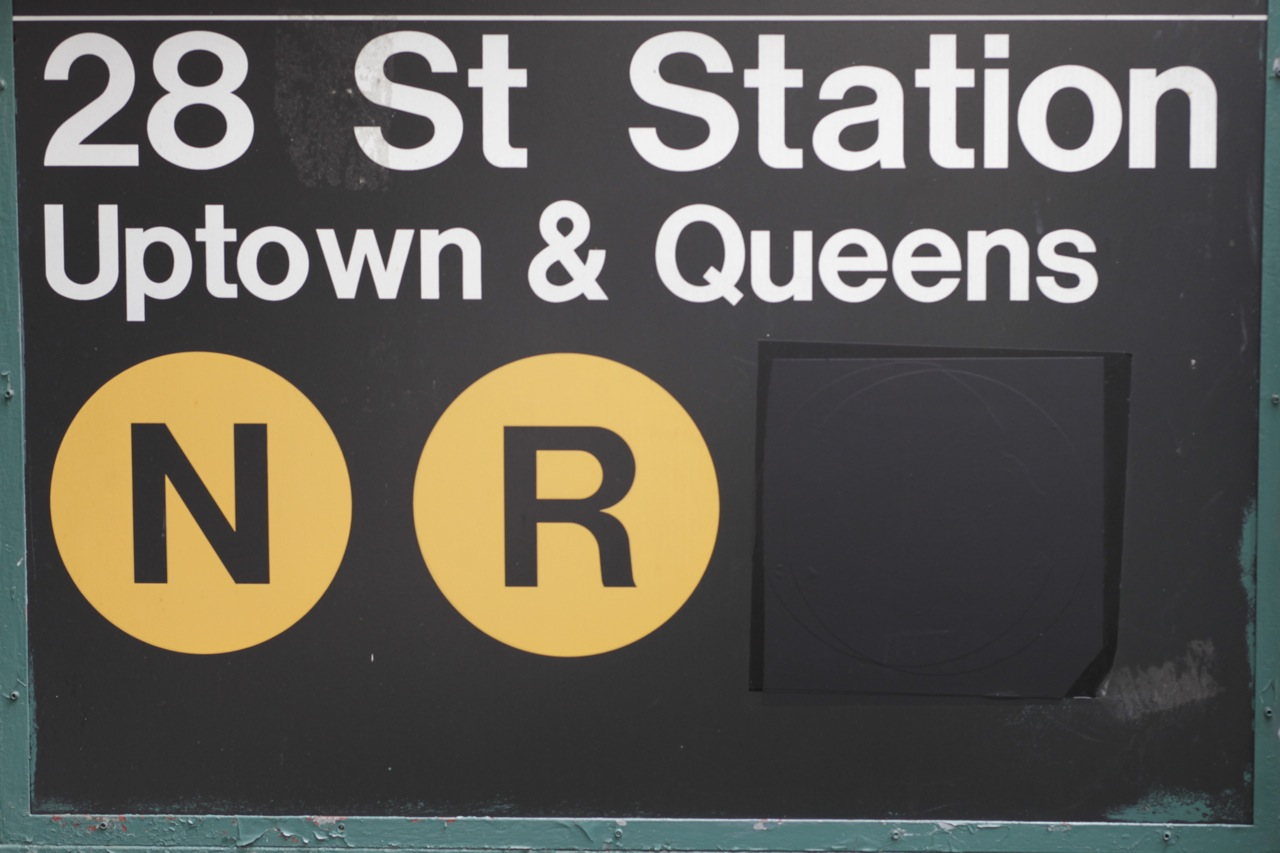
28th Street station after the W train was discontinued in mid-2010. Note the dark grey tape masked over the W bullet. (This sign has since been replaced due to the restoration of the W in 2016.)

The MTA faced a budget deficit of US$1.2 billion in 2009. This resulted in fare increases (three times from 2008 to 2010) and service reductions (including the elimination of two part-time subway services, the V and W). Several other routes were modified due to the deficit. The N was made a full-time local in Manhattan (in contrast to being a weekend local/weekday express before 2010), while the Q was extended nine stations north to Astoria–Ditmars Boulevard on weekdays, both to cover the discontinued W. The M was combined with the V, routing it over the Chrystie Street Connection, IND Sixth Avenue Line and IND Queens Boulevard Line to Forest Hills–71st Avenue on weekdays instead of via the BMT Fourth Avenue Line and BMT West End Line to Bay Parkway. The G was truncated to Court Square full-time. Construction headways on eleven routes were lengthened, and off-peak service was lengthened on seven routes.

=== 2017–2021 state of emergency ===
In June 2017, Governor Andrew Cuomo signed an executive order declaring a state of emergency for the New York City Subway after a series of derailments, track fires, and overcrowding incidents. On June 27, 2017, thirty-nine people were injured when an A train derailed at 125th Street, damaging tracks and signals then catching fire. On July 21, 2017, the second set of wheels on a southbound Q train jumped the track near Brighton Beach, with nine people suffering injuries due to improper maintenance of the car in question. To solve the system's problems, the MTA officially announced the Genius Transit Challenge on June 28, where contestants could submit ideas to improve signals, communications infrastructure, or rolling stock.

On July 25, 2017, Chairman Joe Lhota announced a two-phase, $9 billion New York City Subway Action Plan to stabilize the subway system and to prevent the continuing decline of the system. The first phase, costing $836 million, consisted of five categories of improvements in Signal and Track Maintenance, Car Reliability, System Safety and Cleanliness, Customer Communication, and Critical Management Group. The $8 billion second phase would implement the winning proposals from the Genius Transit Challenge and fix more widespread problems. Six winning submissions for the Genius Transit Challenge were announced in March 2018.

In October 2017, city comptroller Scott Stringer released an analysis that subway delays could cost up to $389 million or $243.1 million or $170.2 million per year depending on the length of the delays. In November 2017, The New York Times published its investigation into the crisis. It found that the crisis had arisen as a result of financially unsound decisions by local and state politicians from both the Democratic and Republican parties. According to the Times, these decisions included overspending; overpaying unions and interest groups; advertising superficial improvement projects while ignoring more important infrastructure; and agreeing to high-interest loans that would have been unnecessary without these politicians' other interventions. By this time, the subway's 65% average on-time performance was the lowest among all major cities' transit systems, and every non-shuttle subway route's on-time performance had declined in the previous ten years. The state of emergency ended on June 30, 2021, after previously being renewed 49 times. As of October 2021, on-time performance across all routes is at 80.6 percent. Worsening subway reliability and service cuts in the early 2020s have been attributed to chronic mismanagement at the agency and a botched restructuring plan that was implemented under former Governor Andrew Cuomo.

=== Capacity constraints ===
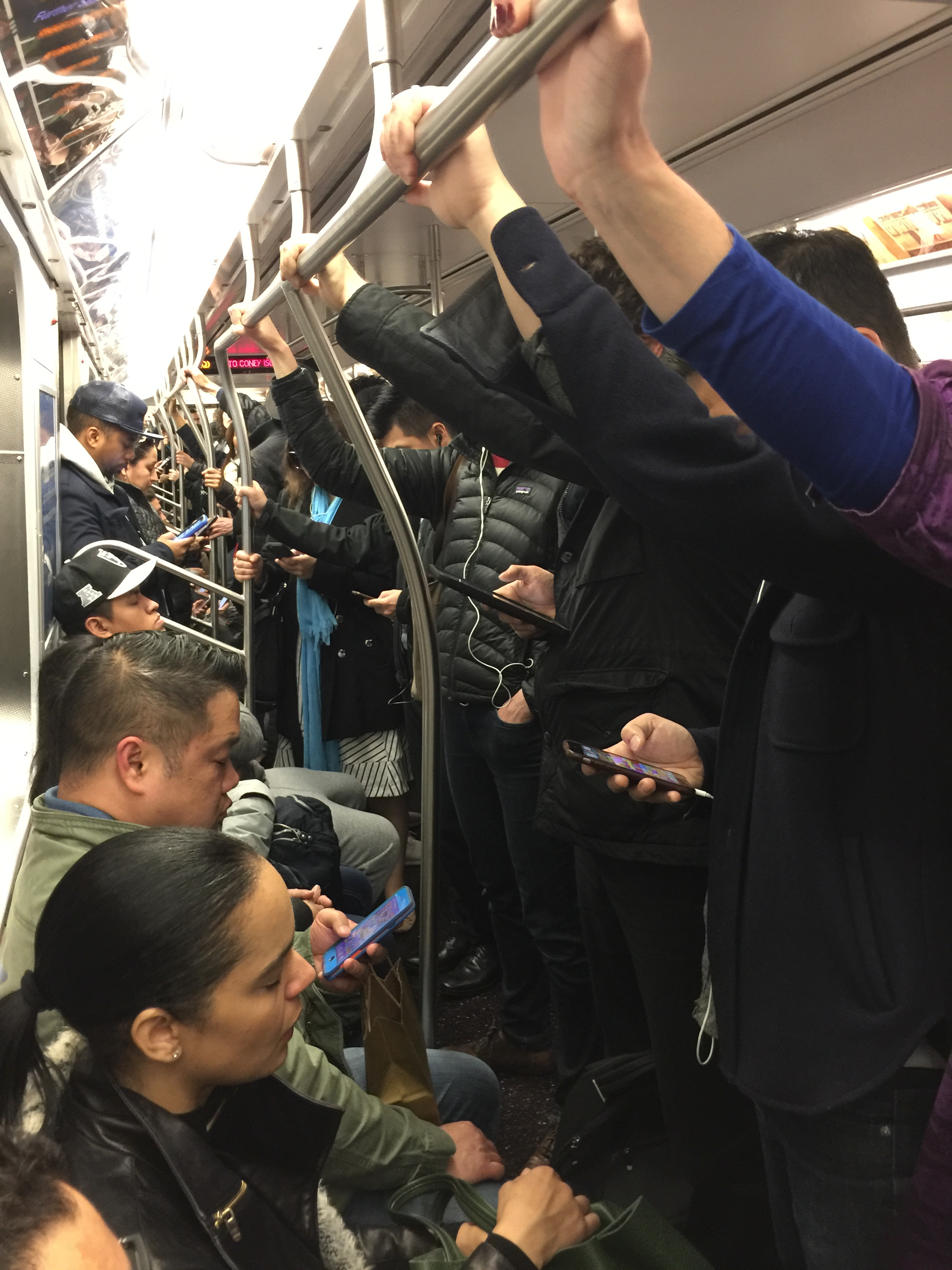
The interior of a Q train during afternoon rush hour

Several subway lines have reached their operational limits in terms of train frequency and passengers, according to data released by the Transit Authority. By 2007, the E, L, and all A Division services except the 42nd Street Shuttle were beyond capacity, as well as portions of the N train. In April 2013, New York magazine reported that the system was more crowded than it had been in the previous 66 years. The subway reached a daily ridership of 6 million for 29 days in 2014, and was expected to record a similar ridership level for 55 days in 2015; by comparison, in 2013, daily ridership never reached 6 million. In particular, the express tracks of the IRT Lexington Avenue Line and IND Queens Boulevard Line are noted for operating at full capacity during peak hours. The Long Island Rail Road East Side Access project, which opened in January 2023, was expected to bring many more commuters to the Lexington Avenue Line. The Second Avenue Subway was built to relieve pressure on the Lexington Avenue Line (4, 5, 6, and <6> trains) by shifting an estimated 225,000 passengers. Following the onset of the COVID-19 pandemic in New York City in 2020, there was enough of a ridership decrease that these routes were no longer crammed to capacity during rush hours, although they still experienced some crowding.

By early 2016, delays as a result of overcrowding were up to more than 20,000 every month, four times the amount in 2012. The overcrowded trains have resulted in an increase of assaults. With less platform space, more passengers are forced to be on the edge of the platform resulting in the increased possibility of passengers falling on the track. The MTA is considering platform screen doors, which exist on the AirTrain JFK to prevent passengers falling onto the tracks. As of February 2022, platform screen doors were planned to be installed in three stations, following an increase in people being pushed onto the tracks.

==== Expanding service frequency via CBTC ====
The MTA has sought to relieve overcrowding by upgrading signaling systems on some lines to use communications-based train control. CBTC installation on the Flushing Line is expected to increase the rate of trains per hour on the 7 and <7> trains, but little relief will come to other crowded lines until later. The L train, which is overcrowded during rush hours, already has CBTC operation. The installation of CBTC has reduced the L's running time by 3%. Even with CBTC, there are limits on the potential increased service. For L service to be increased further, a power upgrade as well as additional space for the L to turn around at its Manhattan terminus, Eighth Avenue, are needed.

==== Service frequency and car capacity ====
Due to an increase of ridership, the MTA has tried to increase capacity wherever possible by adding more frequent service, specifically during the evening hours. This increase is not likely to keep up with the growth of subway ridership. Some lines have capacity for additional trains during peak times, but there are too few subway cars for this additional service to be operated.

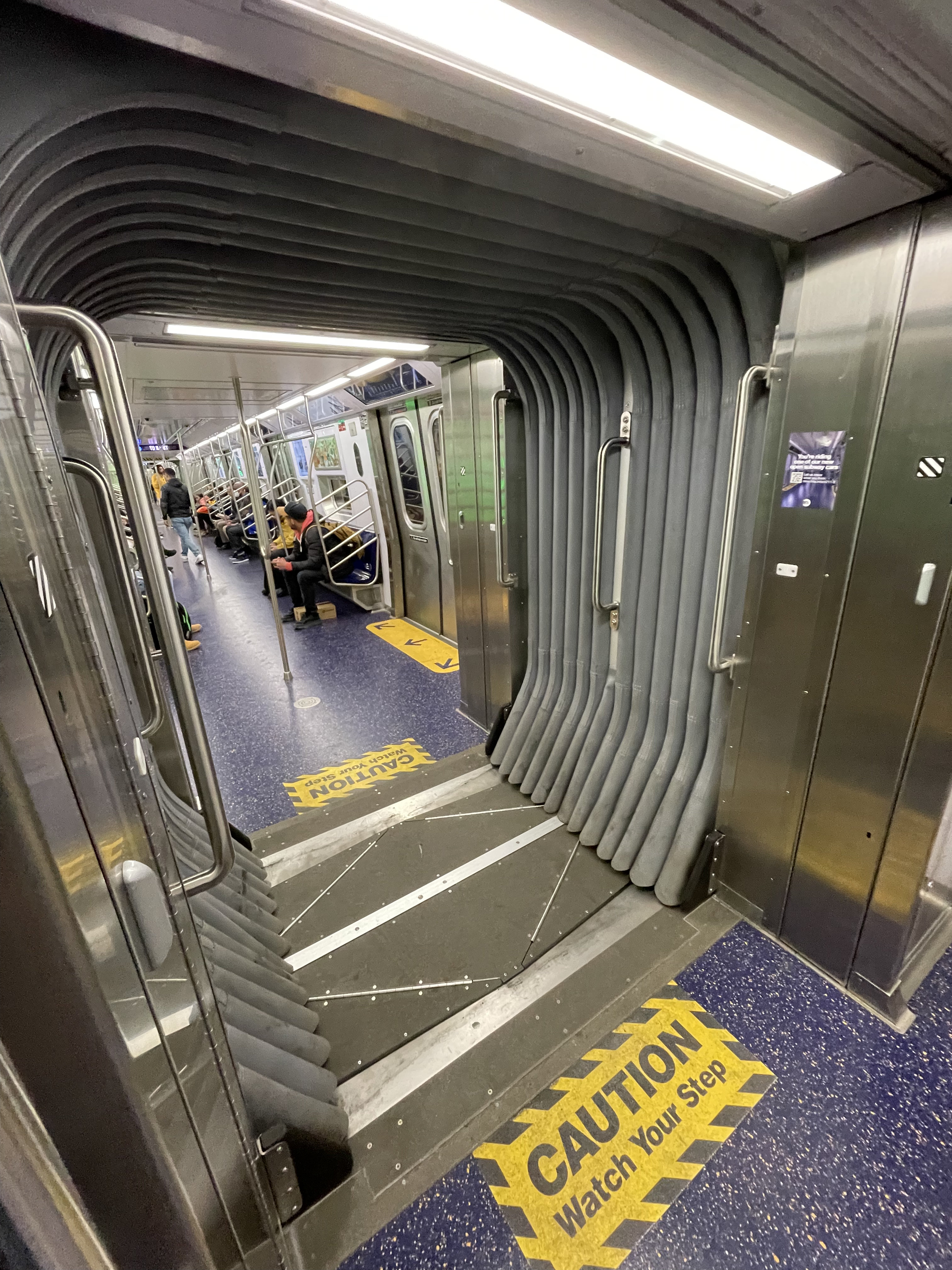
View of an open-gangway used on the R211T subway car

As part of the R211 subway car order, the MTA is planning to test a train of 20 open-gangway experimental prototype cars, which could increase capacity by up to 10% by utilizing space between cars. The order could be expanded to include up to 750 open-gangway cars. On December 16, 2024, the MTA Board voted to approve the second option order of R211s, which would contain 80 additional open-gangway trains.

==== Platform crowd control ====
The MTA is also testing smaller ideas on some services. Starting in late 2015, 100 "station platform controllers" were deployed for the F, 6, and 7 trains, to manage the flow of passengers on and off crowded trains during morning rush hours. There were a total of 129 such employees, who also answer passengers' questions about subway directions, rather than having conductors answer them and thus delaying the trains. In early 2017, the test was expanded to the afternoon peak period with an increase of 35 platform conductors. In November of the same year, 140 platform controllers and 90 conductors gained iPhone 6S devices so they could receive notifications of, and tell riders about, subway disruptions. Subway guards, the predecessors to the platform controllers, were first used during the Great Depression and World War II.

Shortened "next stop" announcements on trains were being tested on the 2 and 5 trains. "Step aside" signs on the platforms, reminding boarding passengers to let departing passengers off the train first, were tested at Grand Central–42nd Street, 51st Street, and 86th Street on the Lexington Avenue Line. Cameras would also be installed so the MTA could observe passenger overcrowding.

In systems like the London Underground, stations are simply closed off when they are overcrowded; that type of restriction is not necessary yet on the New York City Subway, according to MTA spokesman Kevin Ortiz.

=== Subway flooding ===
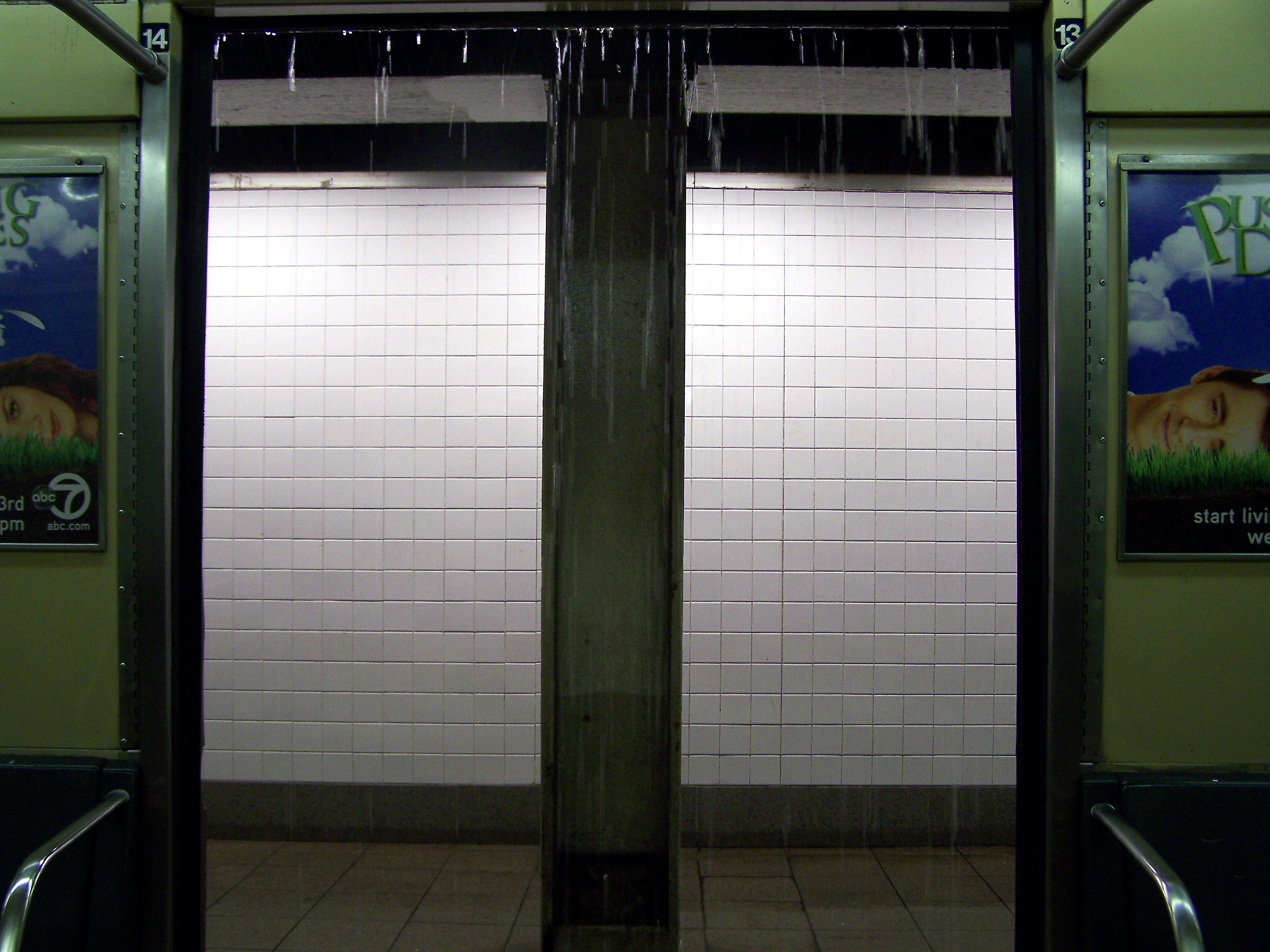
Rain from drainage pipes entering a subway car

Service on the subway system is occasionally disrupted by flooding from rainstorms, even minor ones. Rainwater can disrupt signals underground and require the electrified third rail to be shut off. As of 2007, the MTA moves 13 million US gallons (49 million litres) of water daily when it is not raining. The pumps and drainage system can handle a rainfall rate of 1.75 inches (44 mm) per hour. Since 1992, $357 million has been used to improve 269 pump rooms. By August 2007, $115 million was earmarked to upgrade the remaining 18 pump rooms.

Despite these improvements, the transit system continues to experience flooding problems. On August 8, 2007, after more than 3 inches (76 mm) of rain fell within an hour, the subway system flooded, causing almost every subway service to either be disabled or seriously disrupted, effectively halting the morning rush. On September 1, 2021, when 3 to 5 inches (76 to 127 mm) of rain per hour fell during Hurricane Ida, service on the entire subway system was suspended.

As part of a $130 million and an estimated 18-month project, the MTA began installing new subway grates in September 2008 in an attempt to prevent rain from overflowing into the subway system. The metallic structures, designed with the help of architectural firms and meant as a piece of public art, are placed atop existing grates but with a 3-to-4-inch (76 to 102 mm) sleeve to prevent debris and rain from flooding the subway. The racks will at first be installed in the three most flood-prone areas as determined by hydrologists: Jamaica, Tribeca, and the Upper West Side. Each neighborhood has its own distinct design, some featuring a wave-like deck which increases in height and features seating (as in Jamaica), others with a flatter deck that includes seating and a bike rack.

In October 2012, Hurricane Sandy caused significant damage to New York City, and many subway tunnels were inundated with floodwater. The subway opened with limited service two days after the storm and was running at 80 percent capacity within five days; some infrastructure needed years to repair. A year after the storm, MTA spokesperson Kevin Ortiz said, "This was unprecedented in terms of the amount of damage that we were seeing throughout the system." The storm flooded nine of the system's 14 underwater tunnels, many subway lines, and several subway yards, as well as completely destroying a portion of the IND Rockaway Line and much of the South Ferry terminal station. Reconstruction required many partial or total closures on several lines and tunnels. Heavy flooding also occurred in September 2021 during Hurricane Ida and in September 2023 during the aftermath of Tropical Storm Ophelia.

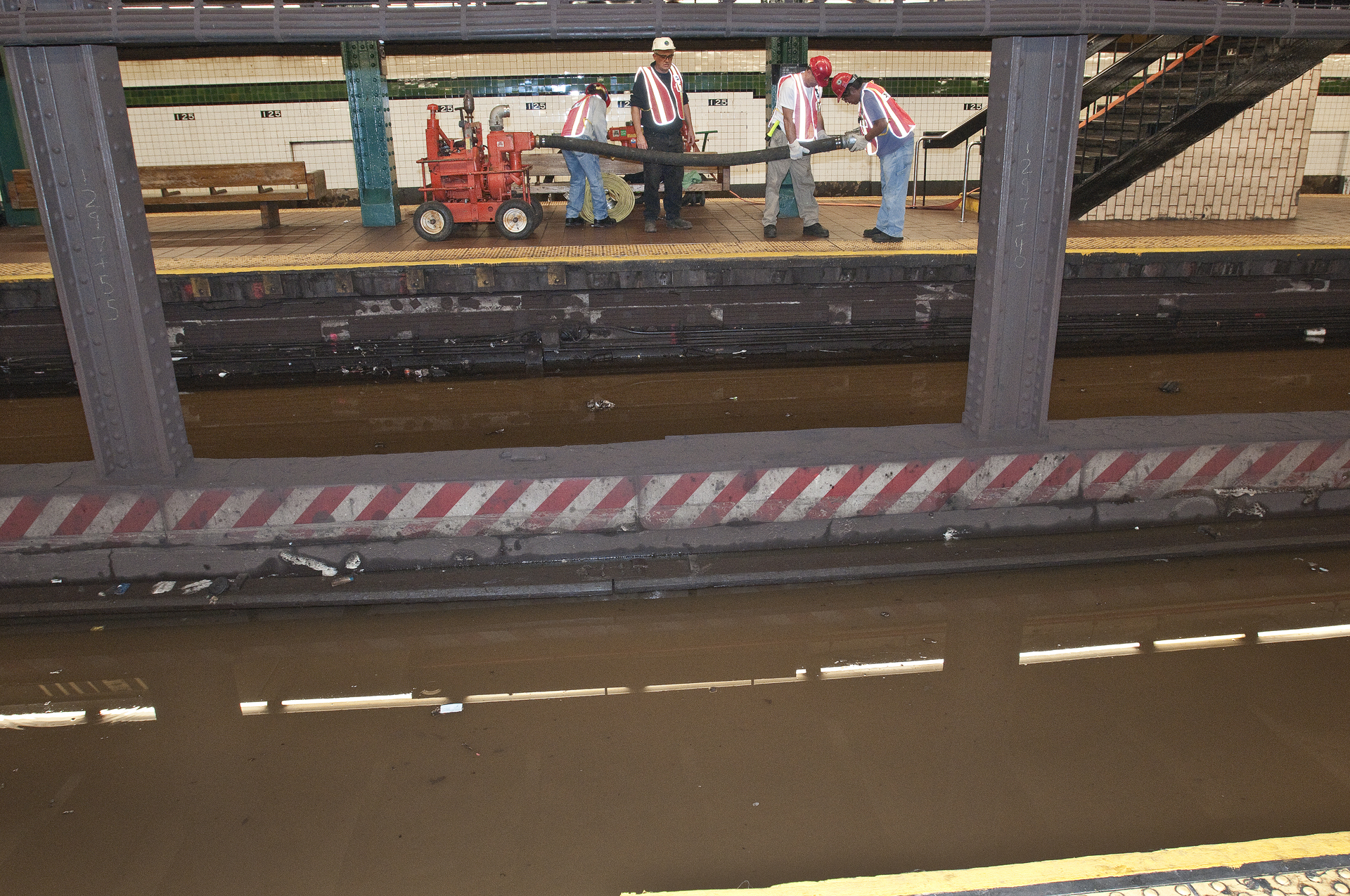
Flooding at 125th Street after a water main break

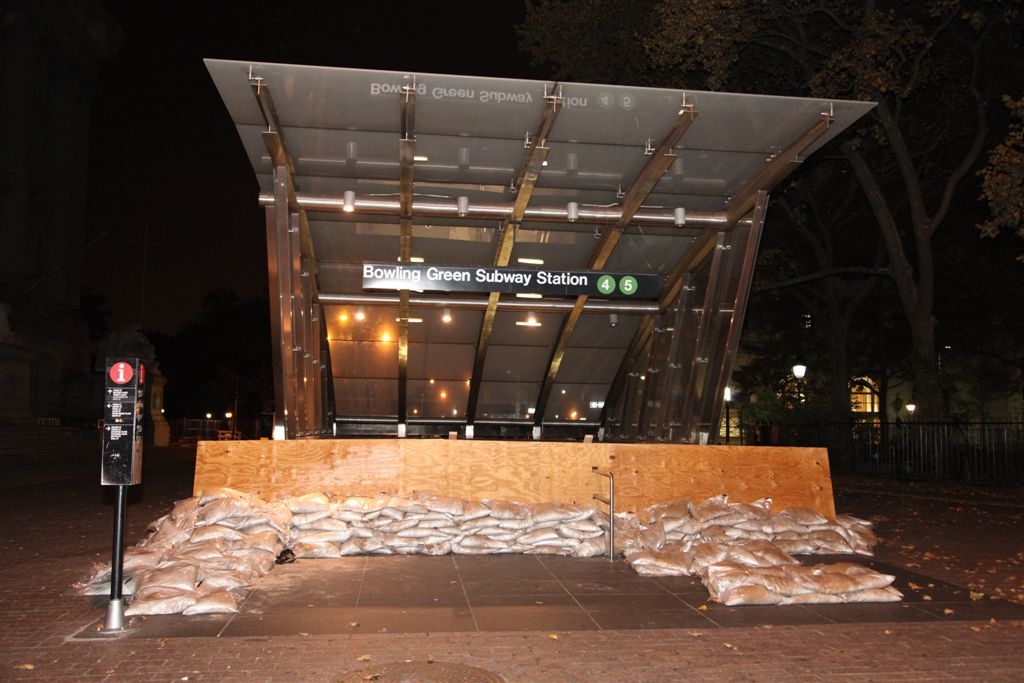
Preparations for Hurricane Sandy at Bowling Green

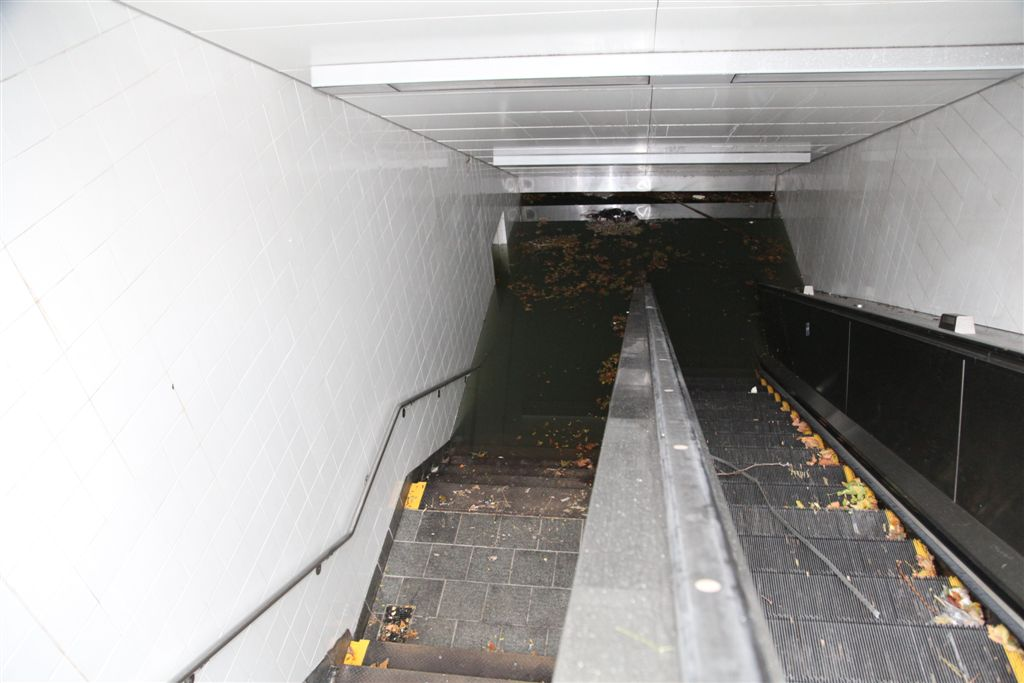
South Ferry after Hurricane Sandy

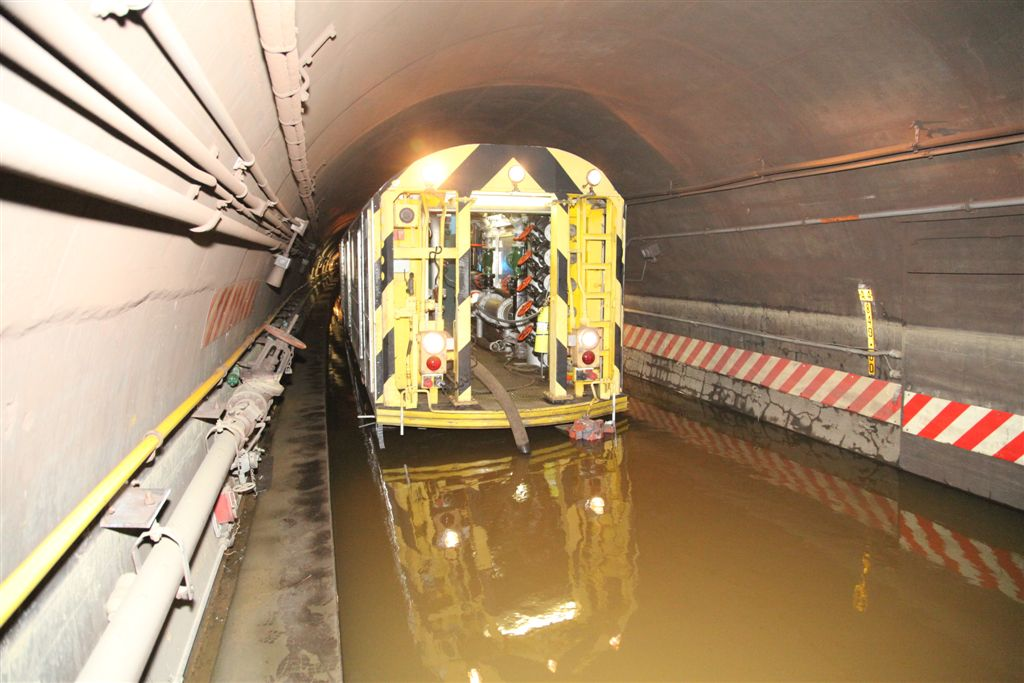
Pump train in the Cranberry Street Tube after Hurricane Sandy

=== Full and partial subway closures ===
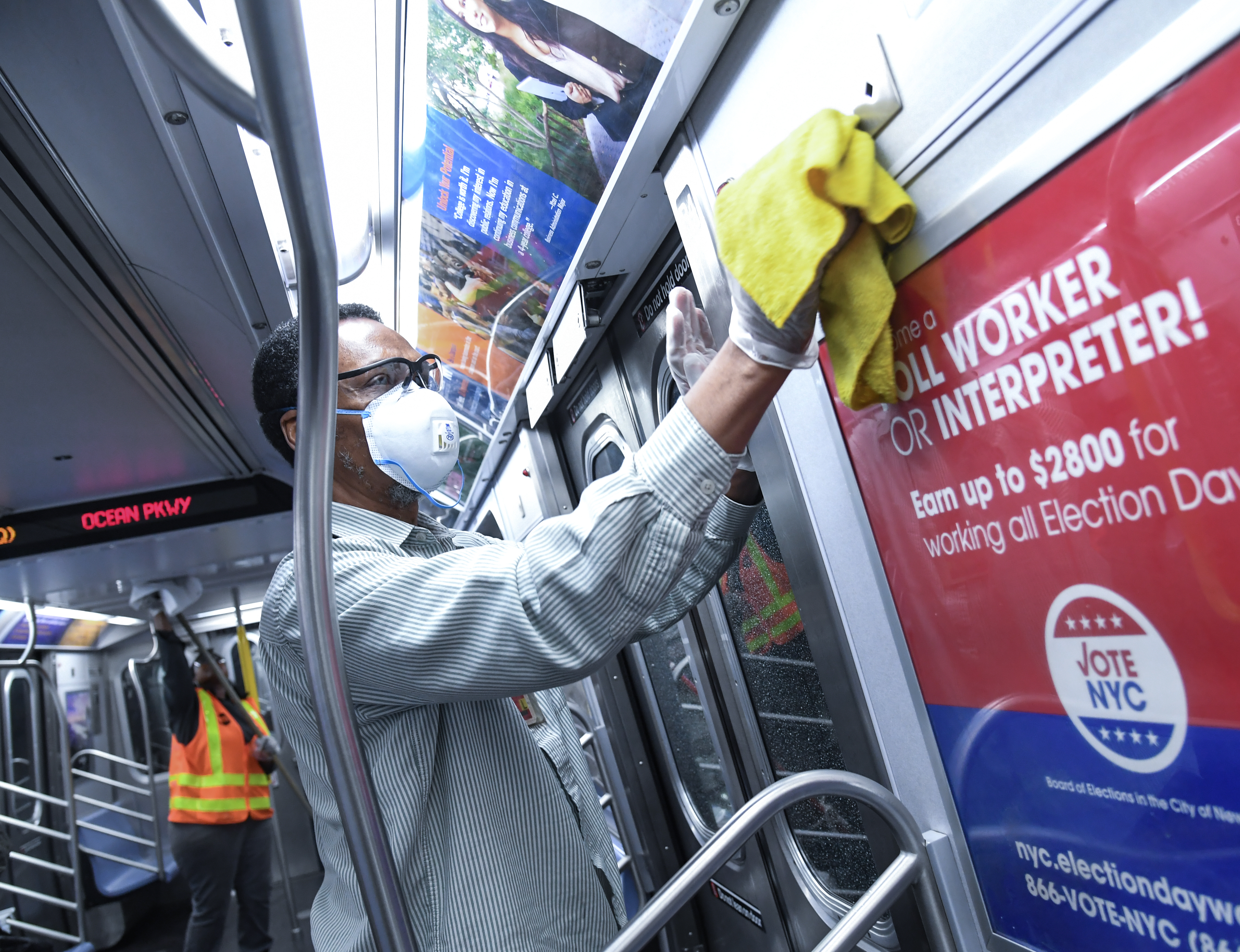
Disinfection of New York City Subway cars against coronavirus during the COVID-19 pandemic in New York City

Before 2011, there have been some full subway closures for transit strikes (January 1–13, 1966, April 1–11, 1980, December 20–22, 2005) and blackouts (November 9–10, 1965, July 13–14, 1977, August 14–16, 2003).

On August 27, 2011, due to the approach of Hurricane Irene, the MTA suspended subway service at noon in anticipation of heavy flooding on tracks and in tunnels. It was the first weather-caused shutdown in the history of the system. Service was restored by August 29.

On October 29, 2012, a full closure was ordered before the arrival of Hurricane Sandy. All services on the subway, the Long Island Rail Road and Metro-North were gradually shut down by 7:00 P.M. to protect passengers, employees, and equipment from the coming storm. The storm caused serious damage to the system, especially the IND Rockaway Line, upon which many sections between Howard Beach–JFK Airport and Hammels Wye on the Rockaway Peninsula were heavily damaged, leaving it essentially isolated from the rest of the system. This required the NYCTA to truck in 20 R32 subway cars to the line to provide some interim service (temporarily designated the H). Also, several of the system's tunnels under the East River were flooded by the storm surge. South Ferry suffered serious water damage and did not reopen until April 4, 2013, by restoring service to the older loop-configured station that had been replaced in 2009; the stub-end terminal tracks remained out of service until June 2017.

Since 2015, there have been several blizzard-related subway shutdowns. On January 26, 2015, another full closure was ordered by New York Governor Andrew Cuomo due to the January 2015 nor'easter, originally projected to leave New York City with 20 to 30 inches (51 to 76 cm) of snow; this was the first shutdown in the system's history to be ordered due to snow. The next day, the subway system was partially reopened. Several residents criticized the decision to shut down the subway system due to snow, as the nor'easter dropped much less snow in the city than originally expected, totaling only 9.8 inches (25 cm) in Central Park. For subsequent snowstorms, the MTA published a winter underground-only subway service plan. When this plan is in effect, all above-ground stations would be closed and all above-ground service suspended, except at 125th Street and Broadway, where 1 trains would run above ground but skip the station. Underground service would remain operational, except at a small number of stations that would be closed because of their proximity to above-ground portions of the system. This plan was first used on January 23, 2016, during the January 2016 United States blizzard; it was also used on March 14, 2017, due to the March 2017 nor'easter. On August 4, 2020, service at above-ground stations was suspended due to the high wind gusts brought by Tropical Storm Isaias. As of 2026, the underground-only service pattern is no longer used during blizzards and snowstorms.

Starting on May 6, 2020, as a result of the COVID-19 pandemic in New York City, stations were closed between 1:00 a.m. and 5:00 a.m. for cleaning and disinfecting. Nevertheless, over 500 trains continued running every 20 minutes between 1 a.m. and 5 a.m., carrying only transit workers and emergency personnel. The trains kept running because there was not enough space in the system to store all trains simultaneously, and also so that they could easily resume service upon the start of rush hour at 5 a.m. In February 2021, the overnight closures were shortened to between 2 and 4 a.m., and in May 2021, Cuomo announced that 24-hour service would resume on May 17. This was the longest shutdown in the subway's history.

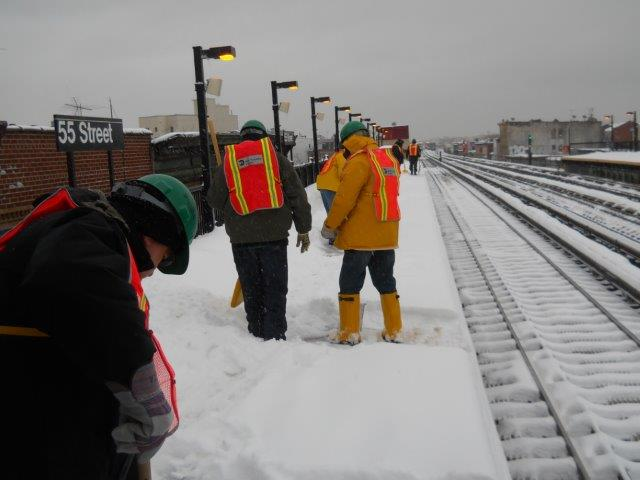
Snow removal during the 2014 snow storm

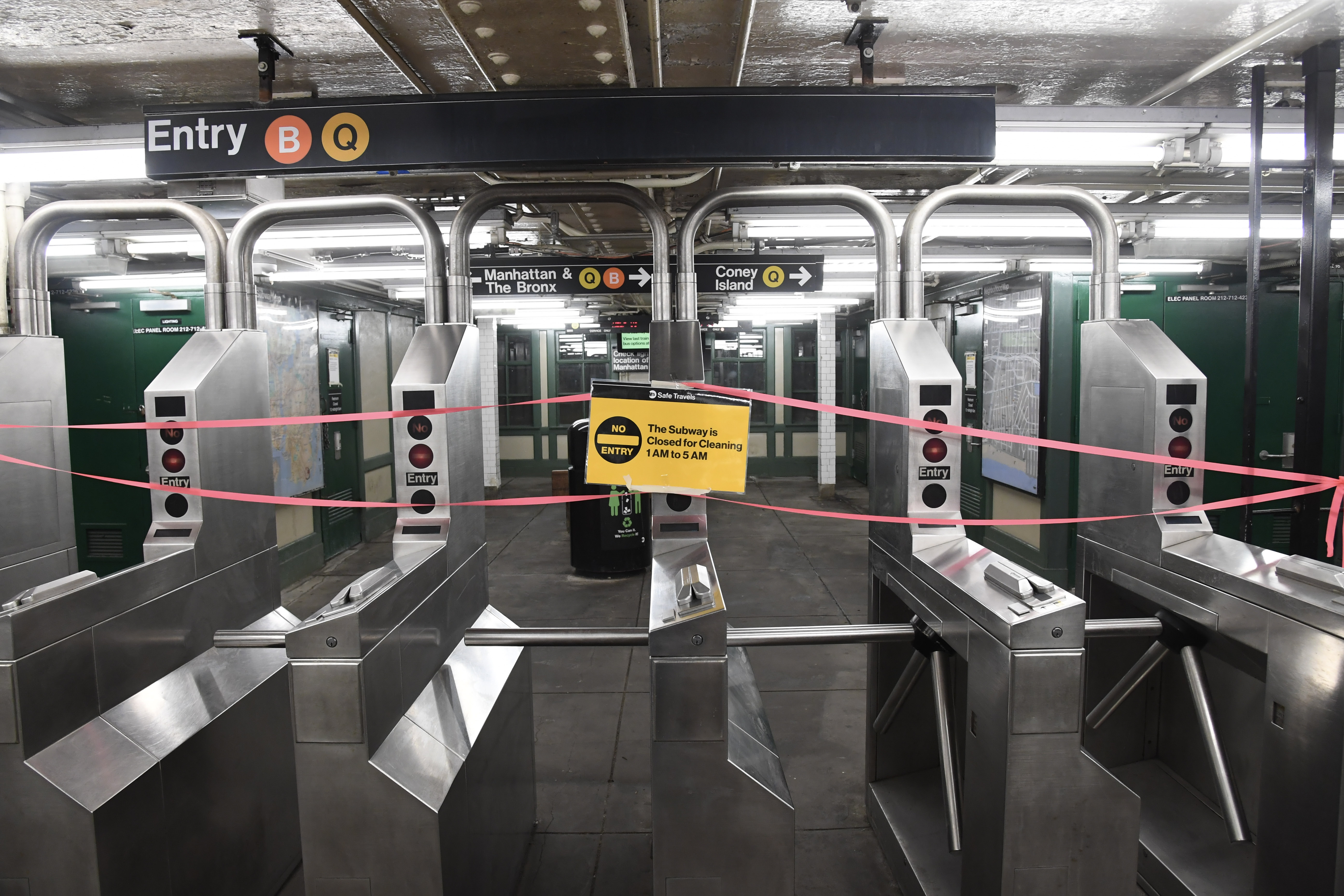
Closed turnstiles during the COVID-19 pandemic

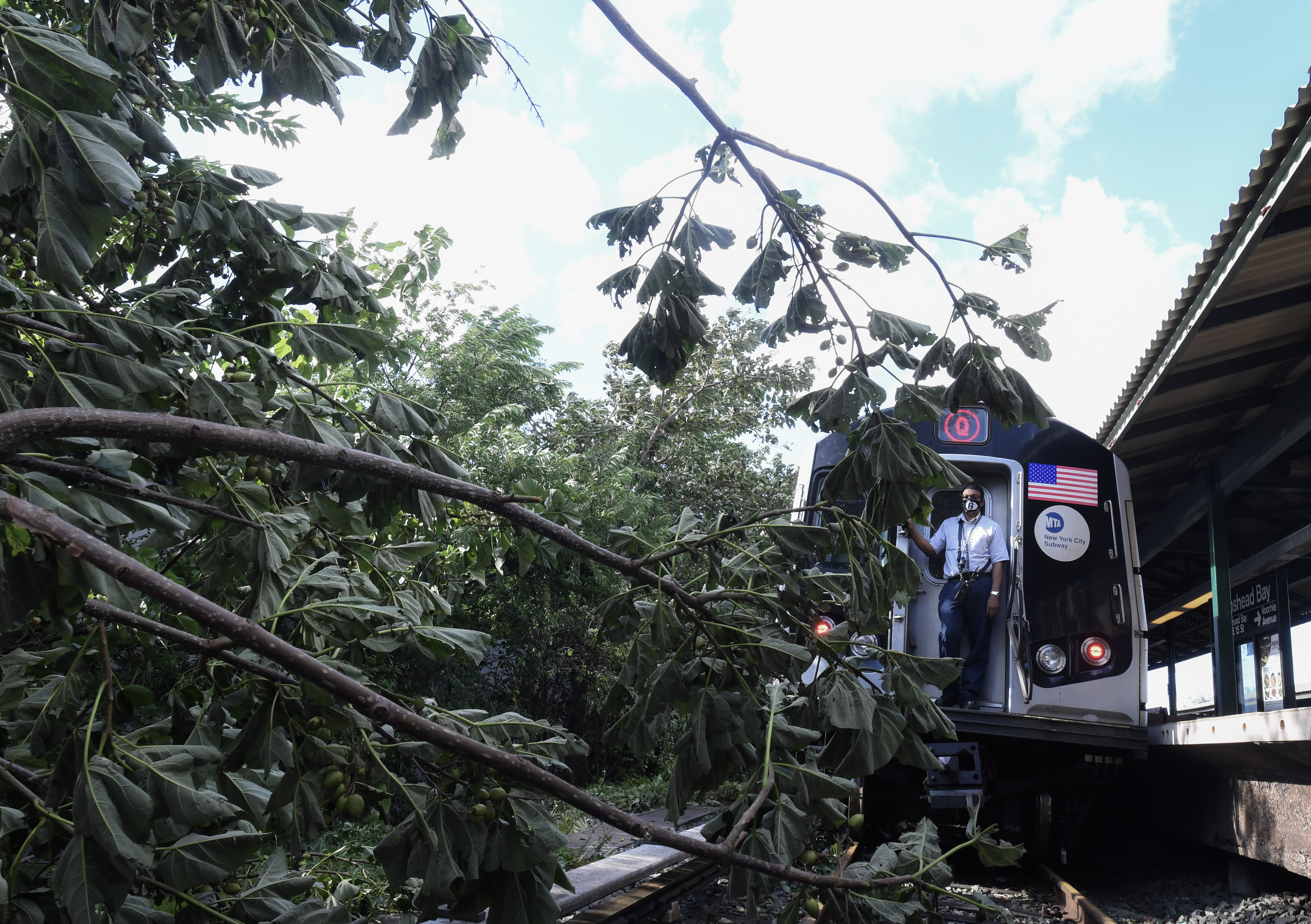
Fallen tree during Hurricane Isaias

=== Litter and rodents ===
Litter accumulation in the subway system is perennial. In the 1970s and 1980s, dirty trains and platforms, as well as graffiti, were a serious problem. The situation had improved since then, but the 2010 budget crisis, which caused over 100 of the cleaning staff to lose their jobs, threatened to curtail trash removal. Every day, the MTA removes 40 tons of trash from 3,500 trash receptacles.

The New York City Subway system is infested with rats. Rats are sometimes seen on platforms, and are commonly seen foraging through garbage thrown onto the tracks. They are believed to pose a health hazard, and on rare instances have been known to bite humans. Subway stations notorious for rat infestation include Chambers Street, Jay Street–MetroTech, West Fourth Street, Spring Street and 145th Street.

Decades of efforts to eradicate or simply thin the rat population in the system have been a failure. In March 2009, the Transit Authority announced a series of changes to its vermin control strategy, including new poison formulas and experimental trap designs. In October 2011, they announced a new initiative to clean 25 subway stations, along with their garbage rooms, of rat infestations. That same month, the MTA announced a pilot program aimed at reducing levels of garbage in the subways by removing all garbage bins from the subway platforms. The initiative was tested at the Eighth Street–New York University and Flushing–Main Street stations. As of March 2016, stations along the BMT Jamaica Line, BMT Myrtle Avenue Line, and various other stations had their garbage cans removed due to the success of the program. In March 2017 the program was ended as a failure.

The old vacuum trains that are designed to remove trash from the tracks are ineffective and often broken. A 2016 study by Travel Math had the New York City Subway listed as the dirtiest subway system in the country based on the number of viable bacteria cells. In August 2016, the MTA announced that it had initiated Operation Track Sweep, an aggressive plan to dramatically reduce the amount of trash on the tracks and in the subway environment. This was expected to reduce track fires and train delays. As part of the plan, the frequency of station track cleaning would be increased, and 94 stations would be cleaned per two-week period, an increase from the previous rate of 34 stations every two weeks. The MTA launched an intensive two-week, system-wide cleaning on September 12, 2016. Several vacuum trains were delivered in 2018 and 2019. The operation planned to also include 27 new refuse cars.

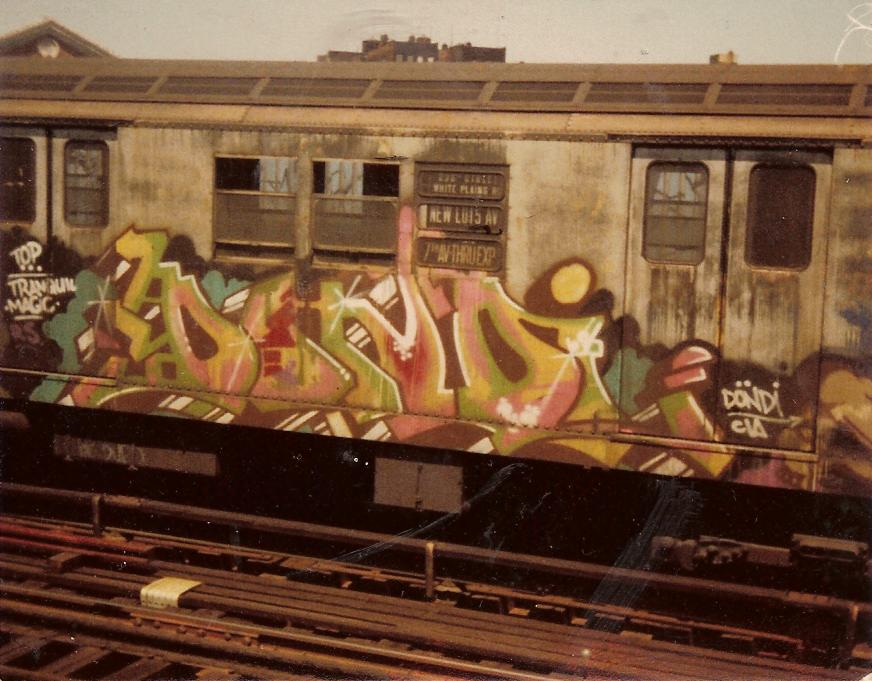
Typical subway car exterior in the late 1970s

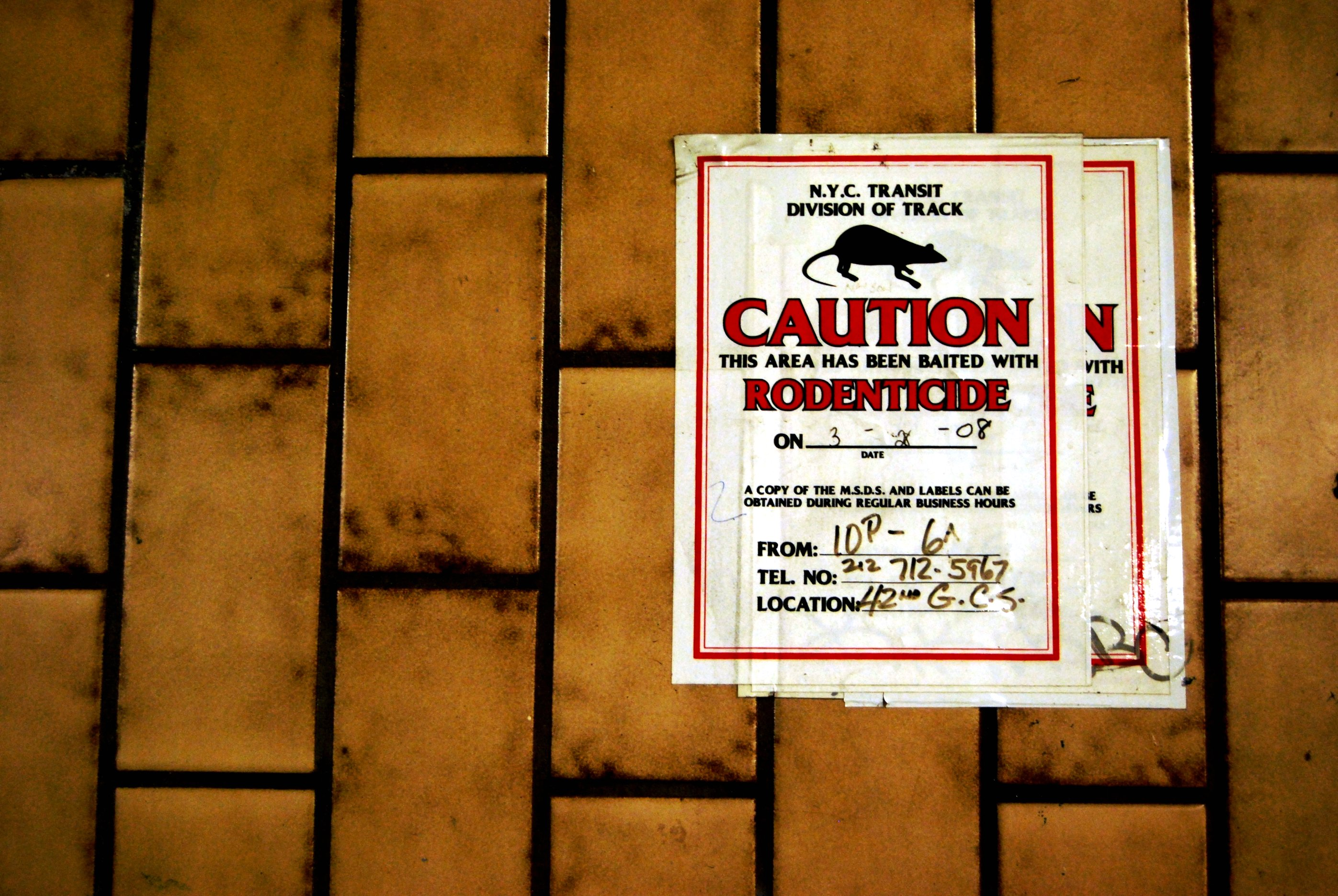
Measures against rats

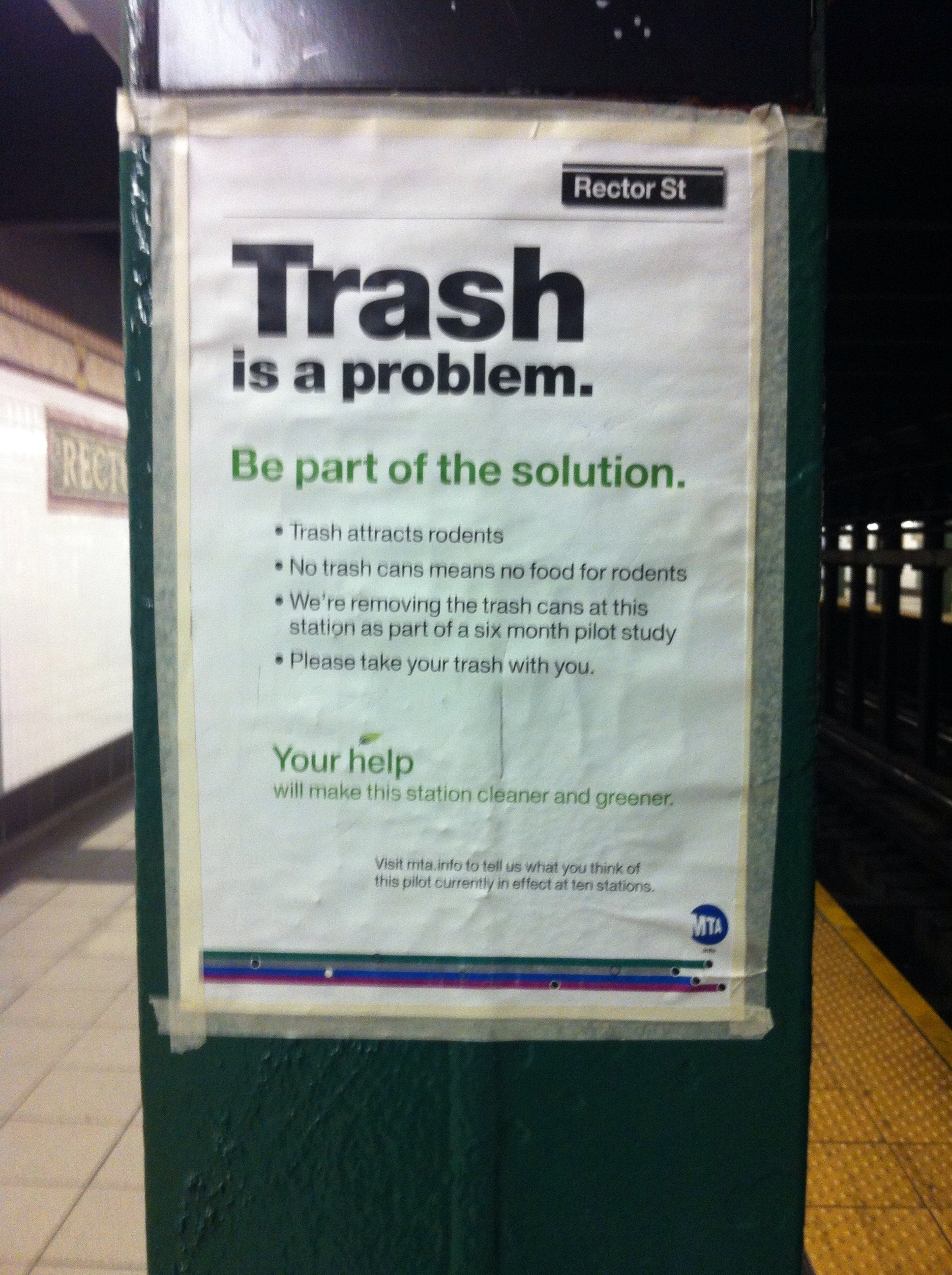
Program for removing garbage bins from stations

=== Noise ===
Rolling stock on the New York City Subway produces high levels of noise that exceed guidelines set by the World Health Organization and the U.S. Environmental Protection Agency. In 2006, Columbia University's Mailman School of Public Health found noise levels averaged 95 decibel (dB) inside subway cars and 94 dB on platforms. Daily exposure to noise at such levels for as little as 30 minutes can lead to hearing loss. Noise on one in 10 platforms exceeded 100 dB. Under WHO and EPA guidelines, noise exposure at that level is limited to 1.5 minutes. A subsequent study by Columbia and the University of Washington found higher average noise levels in the subway (80.4 dB) than on commuter trains including Port Authority Trans-Hudson (PATH) (79.4 dB), Metro-North (75.1 dB) and Long Island Rail Road (LIRR) (74.9 dB). Since the decibel scale is a logarithmic scale, sound at 95 dB is 10 times more intense than at 85 dB, 100 times more intense than at 75 dB, and so forth. In the second study, peak subway noise registered at 102.1 dB.

For the construction of the Second Avenue Subway, the MTA, with the engineering firm Arup, worked to reduce the noise levels in stations. In order to reduce noise for all future stations starting with the Second Avenue Subway, the MTA is investing in low-vibration track using ties encased in concrete-covered rubber and neoprene pads. Continuously welded rail, which is also being installed, reduces the noise being made by the wheels of trains. The biggest change that is going to be made is in the design of stations. Current stations were built with tile and stone, which bounce sound everywhere, while newer stations will have the ceilings lined with absorbent fiberglass or mineral wool that will direct sound toward the train and not the platform. With less noise from the trains, platform announcements could be heard more clearly. They will be clearer with speakers spaced periodically on the platform, angled so that announcements can be heard by the riders. The Second Avenue Subway has the first stations to test this technology.

=== Air quality ===
Air quality in the New York City Subway is a recurring concern. A study from 2023 found much higher exposure to particulate matter concentrations in underground platforms than above ground. Another study from 2014 found that concentrations of particulate matter underground are higher than at street level.

== Public relations and cultural impact ==
=== Entertainment ===
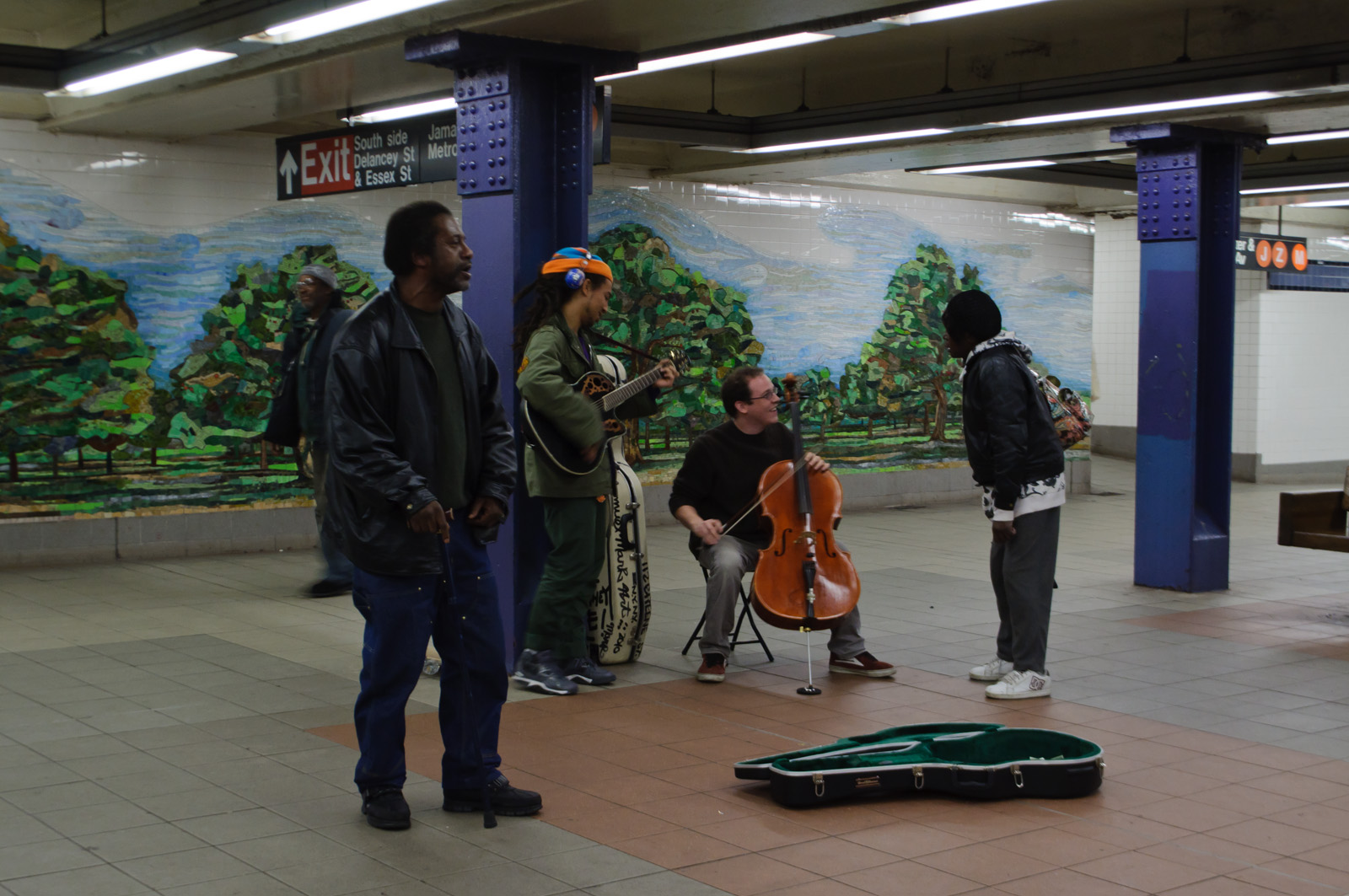
Musicians perform in the Delancey Street/Essex Street station in 2011.

The subway is a popular venue for busking. A permit is not required to perform, but certain codes of conduct are required. Some buskers are affiliated with Music Under New York (MUNY), a part of the Arts & Design program by the MTA. Since 1987, MTA has sponsored the MUNY program in which street musicians enter a competitive contest to be assigned to the preferred high traffic locations. Each year, applications are reviewed and approximately 70 eligible performers are selected and contacted to participate in live auditions held for one day.

=== Miss Subways ===
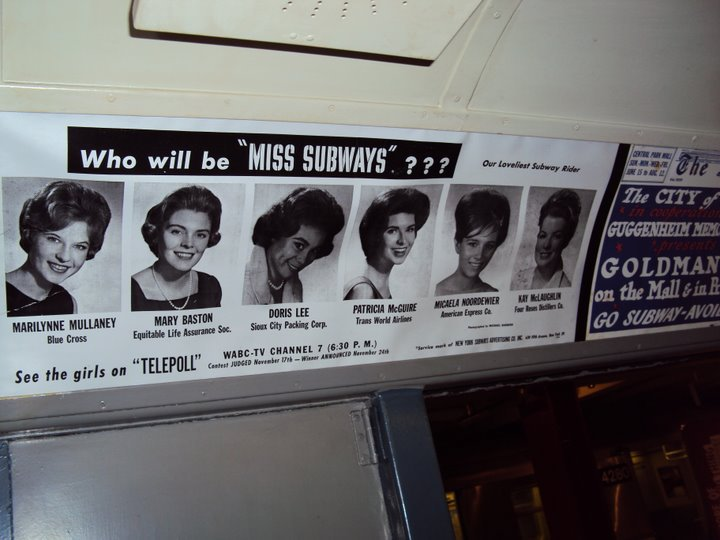
An advertisement for Miss Subways at the New York Transit Museum

From 1941 to 1976, the Board of Transportation/New York City Transit Authority sponsored the "Miss Subways" publicity campaign. In the musical On the Town, the character Miss Turnstiles is based on the Miss Subways campaign. The campaign was resurrected in 2004, for one year, as "Ms. Subways". It was part of the 100th anniversary celebrations. The monthly campaign, which included the winners' photos and biographical blurbs on placards in subway cars, featured such winners as Mona Freeman and prominent New York City restaurateur Ellen Goodman. The winner of this contest was Caroline Sanchez-Bernat, an actress from Morningside Heights.

=== Subway Series ===
Subway Series is a term applied to any series of baseball games between New York City teams, as opposing teams can travel to compete merely by using the subway system. Subway Series is a term long used in New York, going back to series between the Brooklyn Dodgers or New York Giants and the New York Yankees in the 1940s and 1950s. Today, the term is used to describe the rivalry between the Yankees and the New York Mets. During the 2000 World Series, cars on the 4 train (which stopped at Yankee Stadium) were painted with Yankees colors, while cars on the 7 train (which stopped at Shea Stadium) had Mets colors.

=== Holiday Nostalgia Train ===
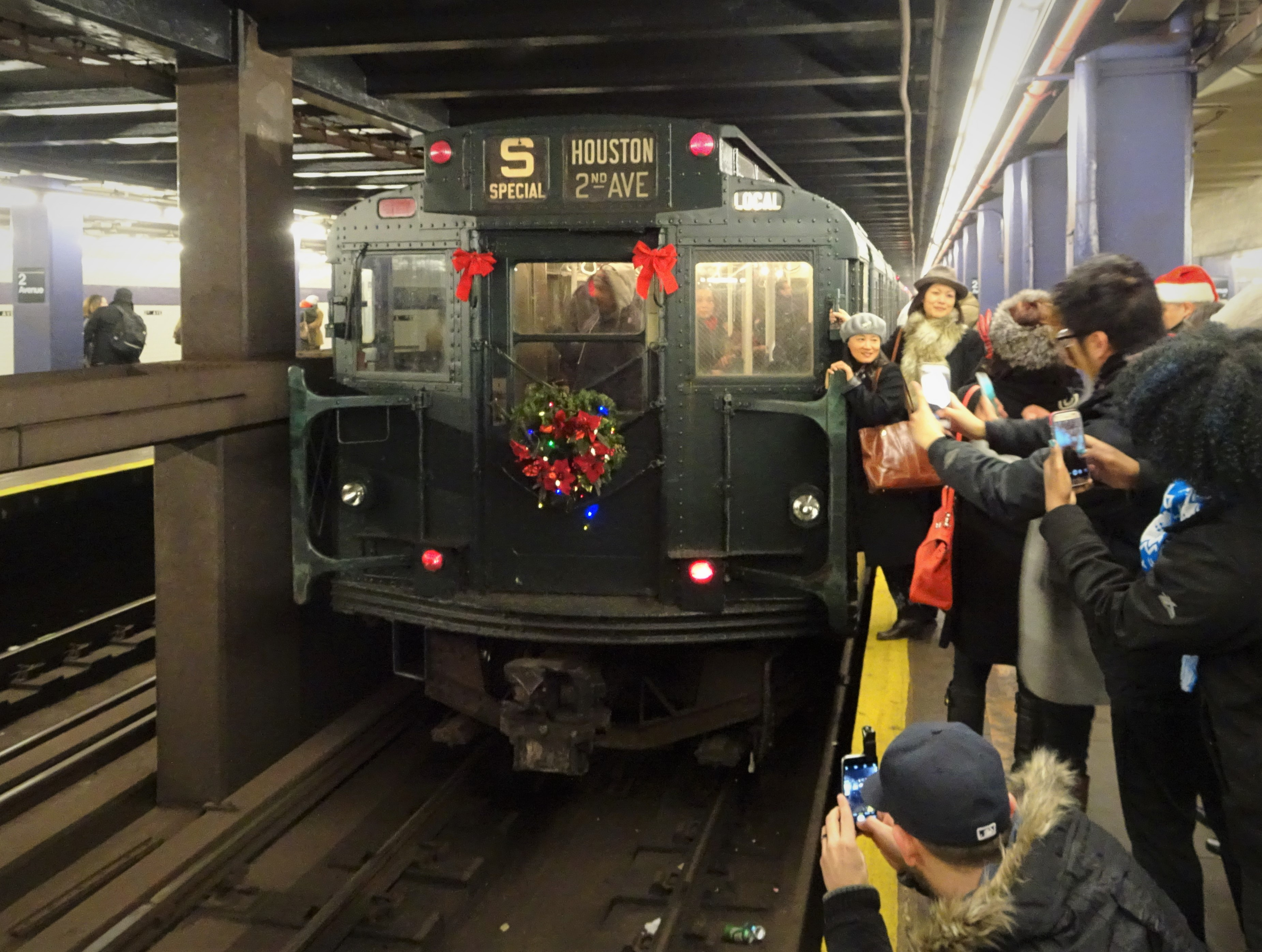
Holiday Nostalgia Train at Second Avenue station in 2016

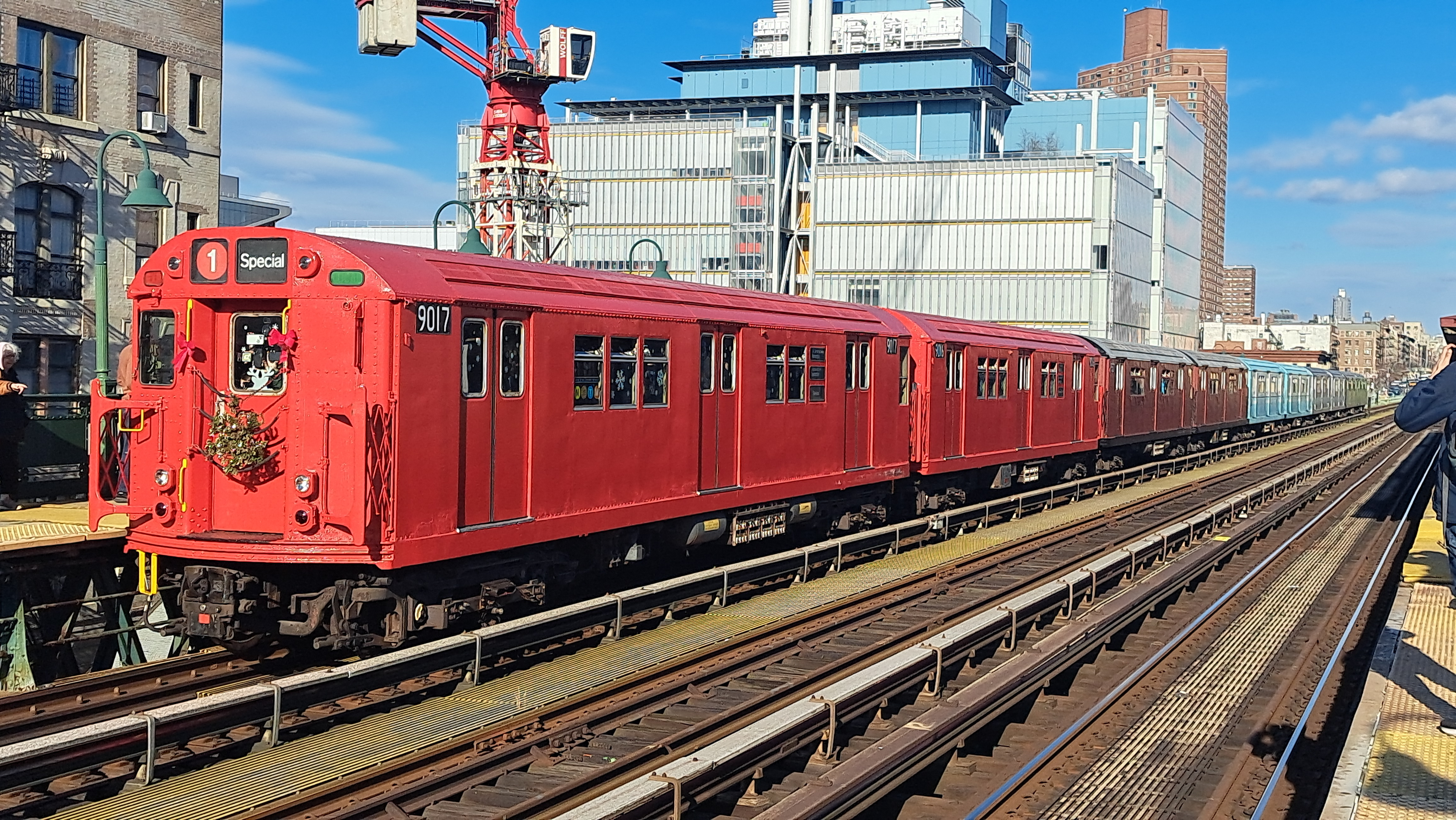
Holiday Train in December 2022 at 125th Street station

Since 2003, the MTA has operated a Holiday Nostalgia Train on Sundays in November and December, from the first Sunday after Thanksgiving to the Sunday before Christmas Day, except in 2011 and 2023, when the train operated on Saturdays instead of Sundays. This train is made of vintage cars from the R1–9 fleet, which have been preserved by Railway Preservation Corp. and the New York Transit Museum. Until 2017, the train made all stops between Second Avenue in Manhattan and Queens Plaza in Queens via the IND Sixth Avenue Line and the IND Queens Boulevard Line. In 2017, the train ran between Second Avenue and 96th Street via the newly opened Second Avenue Subway. Between 2018 and 2019 and in 2023, the northern terminal was located at 145th Street. In 2020, the holiday train was done virtually due to the Covid-19 pandemic. In 2021 and January 2022, the holiday train was run as the R32 retirement run; during the first three weeks, it ran Second Avenue to 145th Street as a D train, and during the final week, it ran from 96th Street-2nd Avenue to Brighton Beach. In 2022, the Holiday Train ran on IRT tracks with the Train of Many Colors, signed as the 1 train, which traveled between 137th Street and Chambers Street. Since 2024, the train's northern terminal was moved back to 96th Street–Second Avenue.

The contract, car numbers (and year built) used generally comprises R1 100 (built 1930), R1 103 (1930), R1 381 (1931), R4 401 (1932), R4 484 (1932) – Bulls Eye lighting and a test P.A. system added in 1946, R6-3 1000 (1935), R6-1 1300 (1937), R7A 1575 (1938) – rebuilt in 1947 as a prototype for the R10 subway car, and R9 1802 (1940).

=== Full train wraps ===
Since 2008, the MTA has tested full train wraps on 42nd Street Shuttle rolling stock. In full train wraps, advertising entirely covers the interiors and exteriors of the train, as opposed to other routes, whose stock generally only displays advertising on placards inside the train. While most advertisements are well received, a few advertisements have been controversial. Among the more contentious wraps that were withdrawn are a 2015 ad for the TV show The Man in the High Castle, which featured a Nazi flag, and an ad for Fox Sports 1, in which a shuttle train and half of its seats were plastered with negative quotes about the New York Knicks, one of the city's NBA teams.

Other routes have seen limited implementation of full train wraps. For instance, in 2010, one R142A train set on the 6 route was wrapped with a Target advertisement. In 2014, the Jaguar F-Type was advertised on train sets running on the F route. Some of these wraps have also been controversial, such as a Lane Bryant wrap in 2015 that displayed lingerie models on the exteriors of train cars.

=== LGBT Pride-themed trains and MetroCards ===
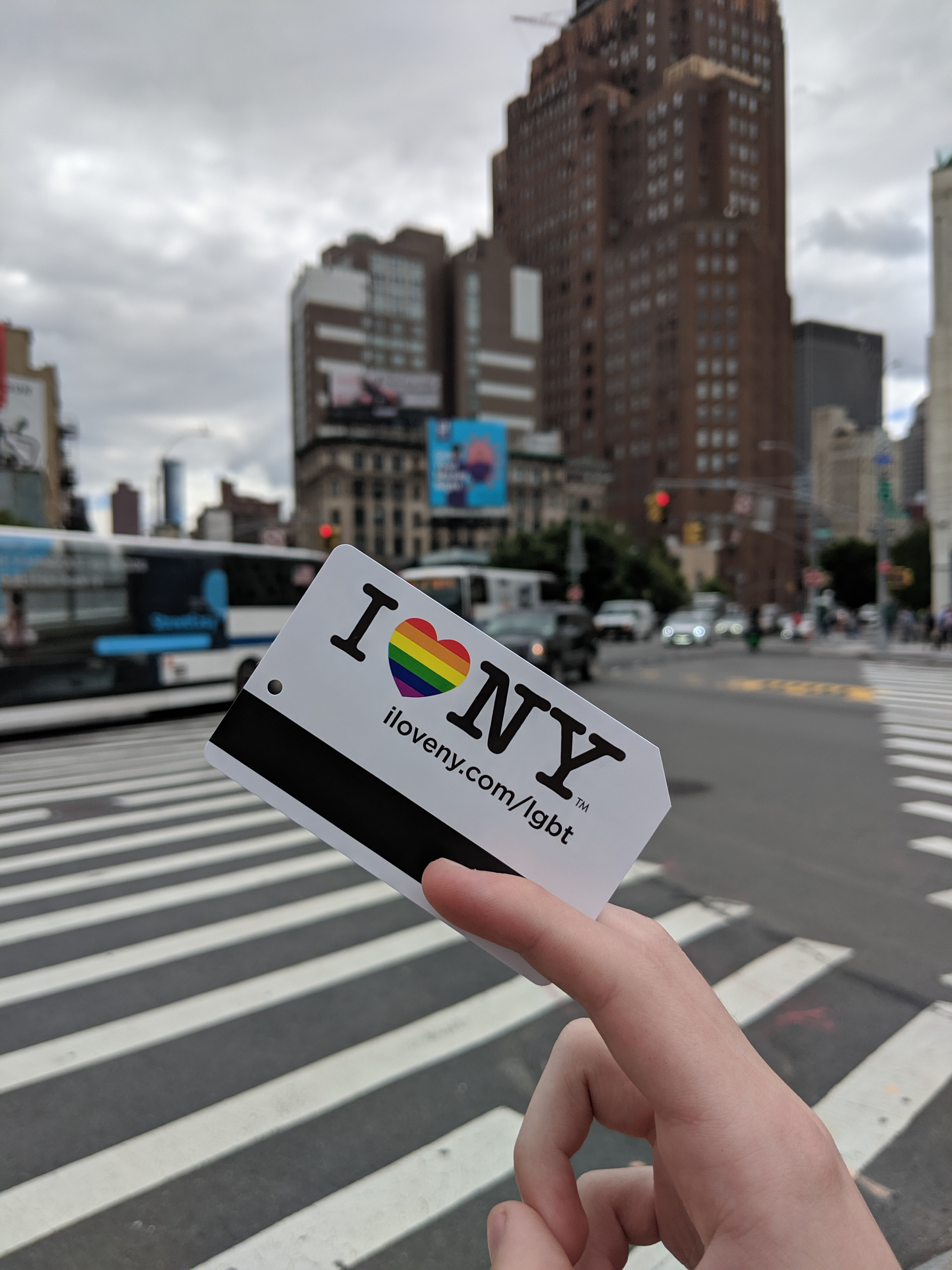
MetroCard for Pride Month in June 2019

The New York City Subway system commemorates Pride Month in June with Pride-themed posters. The MTA celebrated Stonewall 50 – WorldPride NYC 2019 in June 2019 with rainbow-themed Pride logos on the subway trains, as well as Pride-themed MetroCards. In 2023, some trains were given different pride hearts, which were also installed on both the Long Island Railroad and Metro-North Railroad. The MTA also released another set of Pride MetroCards.

=== Guerrilla art ===
The New York City Subway system has been a target for unauthorized or "guerrilla" art since the 1970s, beginning with graffiti and tagging. Originally thought of as vandalism, the art form eventually emerged as an authoritative typology in the 1980s, especially with the release of the 1983 documentary Style Wars. Prominent pop-artist Keith Haring got his start tagging blank billboards on subway platforms with chalk art. In 2019–2020, the Bronx Museum mounted an exhibition of graffiti-tagged subway cars.

More contemporary installations have taken place as well. In 2014, artist London Kaye yarn-bombed the L train, wrapping metal hand poles in knit fabric. In 2019, artist Ian Callender used projectors to show accurate views of the cityscape above moving 6 trains on the ceilings of entire cars. In 2021, illustrator Devon Rodriguez went viral for his drawings of fellow commuters.

=== No Pants Ride ===
In 2002, the New York City Subway began hosting an event called the No Pants Subway Ride, where people ride the subway without their pants. The event is typically held each January but has not been held since 2020 due to the COVID-19 pandemic.

== See also ==
- Julio and Marisol, an advertising campaign in the New York City Subway from 1989 to 2001
- List of United States rapid transit systems by ridership
- New York City Subway in popular culture
- New York City Subway tiles
- Staten Island Railway
- Subway Challenge
- Transportation in New York City
