= Pancracio Chocolates =

Spanish chocolates brand

Pancracio Chocolates is an artisan chocolate brand. The firm originated in Cadiz, Spain, and was founded in 2003 by Pedro Alvarez, economic and graphic designer. In 2017 it was bought by a luxury sector Valencian firm. The chocolates and sweets are made in Spain and are sold in renowned department stores and gourmet shops around the world.

== Origin and development ==
The brand developed from Alvarez’s love for chocolate and is characterized by careful presentation. This draws on the professional experience of its founder who is a graphic designer. He trained in the 1990s in New York at, among others, the School of Visual Arts. This period saw a boom in coffees outlets, like Starbucks, and Alvarez was inspired to start his own entrepreneurial project in sweets and chocolate.

After studying Catering and Pastry Making at the International Culinary Center of New York University, Alvarez returned to Europe where he continued his training as a chocolatier at Sole Graells in Barcelona, Chocovic with Ramón Morató in Vic and Le Cordon Bleu in London. Determined to create his own brand, he found an artisan chocolatier to create the chocolates that he had designed, and, in 2003, he created the first batch of nougats and chocolates, carefully presented and packaged, and launched in Cádiz under the name Pancracio.

Subsequently, products were sold at Colette de Paris and shortly after at Bergdorf Goodman in New York, Neiman Marcus in the US, Selfridges in London and select stores in Spain. Eventually, a boutique was opened in Cádiz. The chocolates were also sold through a dedicated website, which enabled access to an international market alongside the very selective distribution.

The company produces a range of chocolate and confectionery products. These include crunchy chocolates, truffles with armagnac, dark chocolate with hazelnuts, chocolate-covered almonds, nougats, panettones, bars, chocolate sardines and chocolate corn, spreadable creams, fondue chocolate, and cupcakes. It also produces teas, jams, and a chocolate vodka. Recipes appear in the books Modern Chocolate (2008) and Postmodern Chocolate (2016).

Each Pancracio product has its own identity. They are presented in a white box with a clean design; a cotton ribbon and the product name. The white background edged with black is sophisticated and minimalist, reminiscent of old cafes and patisseries. The packages were designed by Pedro Álvarez from Ideologo branding, together with Massimo Vignelli, from Vignelli Associates, Alexander Gelman from Design Machin, and Pati Núñez.

== Awards and Recognitions ==
=== Pancracio Original Chocolate Vodka ===
- "Best in Class 2008" in the International Wine & Spirit Competition.
- Bronze in the White Spirits category in the International Spirits Challenge (2008)

=== Pancracio Store ===
- 2011 Grand Prix Gourmet Award by Marie Claire.

=== Packaging Pancracio ===
- Communications Arts, Design Magazine, 2006, nº 344.
- Design Annual, 2007, nº 47.

=== Chocolate Moderno Book ===
- Gourmand World Cookbook Award 2008

== Cook books ==
- Chocolate Moderno(2008), by Pedro Álvarez and the Pancracio team. Edit El País Aguilar. ISBN 9788403508408
- Chocolate Posmoderno (2016), by Pedro Álvarez and the Pancracio team, Ed. Grijalbo. ISBN 978-8416449521

== Related links ==
- Marca España, the most exquisite chocolate is Spanish.
- Pancracio Website
- Ideologo Branding
