= Doblin =

Doblin, Döblin, or Doeblin may refer to:

- Hugo Döblin (1876–1960), German actor
- Alfred Döblin (1878–1957), German novelist
  - 30778 Döblin, minor planet named for Alfred Döblin
- Wolfgang Doeblin (1915–1940), German-French mathematician, son of Alfred
- Jay Doblin (1920–1989), American industrial designer
- Rick Doblin (born 1953), American drug activist
