= Vignelli Associates =

Modernist design firm founded by Massimo and Lella Vignelli

- Industry: Design
- Founded: 1971
- Founder: Massimo Vignelli, Lella Vignelli
- Defunct: 2014

Vignelli Associates was a design firm co-founded and run by Massimo and Lella Vignelli in New York City, from 1971 to 2014. They worked firmly within the modernist tradition, stressing simplicity by using basic geometric shapes and a limited range of typefaces. Their design work, encompassing graphic design, branding and corporate identity, architecture and interiors, and industrial design is considered among the most influential of the 20th century.

== Founding ==
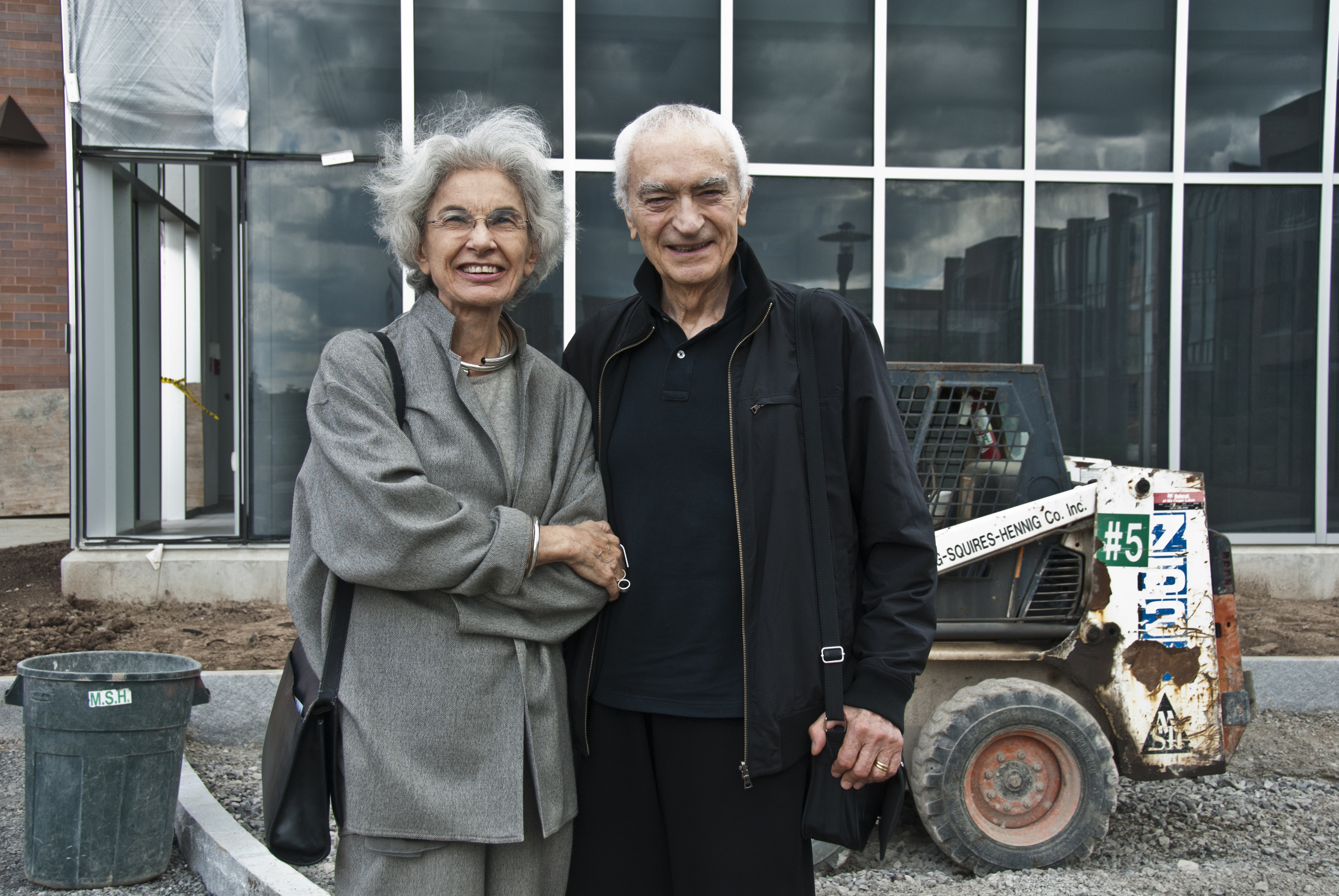
Lella and Massimo Vignelli in front of the Vignelli Center for Design Studies at Rochester Institute of Technology in 2010

In 1965, Massimo Vignelli co-founded the corporate design consultancy Unimark International with Bob Noorda, and Ralph Eckerstrom. In 1971, Vignelli resigned from Unimark, in part because the design vision which he supported became diluted as the company grew, diversified, and increasingly emphasized marketing, rather than design. Soon after, Massimo and Lella Vignelli founded Vignelli Associates, opening offices in New York, Paris, and Milan.

== Work ==
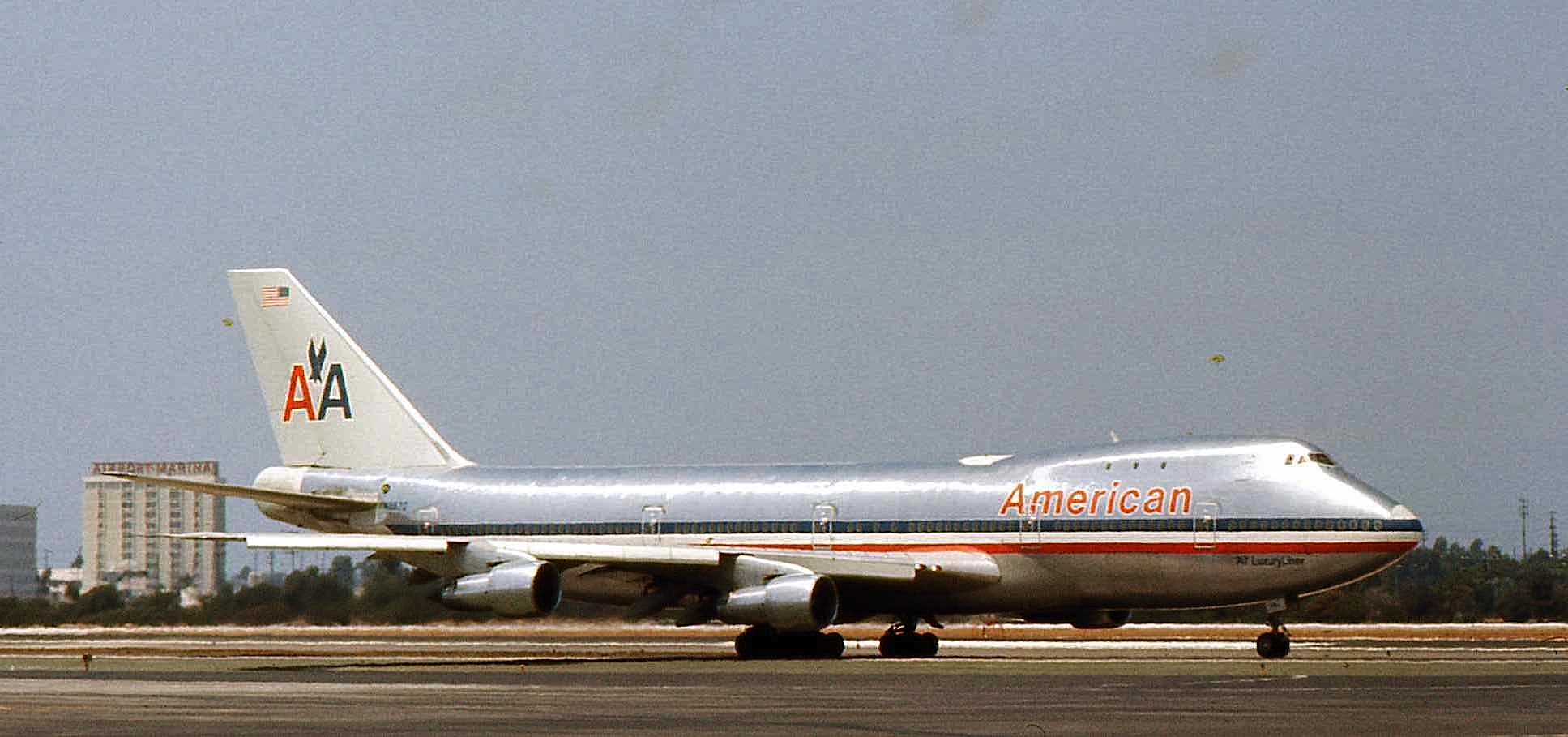
Vignelli's 1967 American Airlines logo and aircraft livery

Vignelli's 1972 New York City subway map

Some of their most well-known designs involved brand identity for major clients including Knoll International (1965), for which they led a comprehensive review of the company's visual presence, American Airlines (1967), for which they designed the airline's logo, and the New York City Subway, for which they designed the signage and wayfinding systems and map first at Unimark and then as Vignelli Associates.

In later years, the couple's noteworthy commissions included the corporate identities for Bloomingdale's department store (1972) and for automobile and motorcycle manufacturers Lancia (1978) and Ducati (1992), as well as the signage system for the Guggenheim Museum Bilbao (1997). Their significant furniture designs included the Handkerchief chair for Knoll International (1982), the Serenissimo table (1985) for Italian manufacturer Acerbis, and the Magic coffee table (1990) for Acerbis's lower-priced Morphos label. Other Vignelli designs have also included retail layouts for Artemide, jewelry for Cleto Munari, and glassware for Venini and Steuben Glass Works.

Former Vignelli Associates employee Michael Bierut wrote that "it seemed to me that the whole city of New York was a permanent Vignelli exhibition [around 1981]. To get to the office, I rode in a subway with Vignelli-designed signage, shared the sidewalk with people holding Vignelli-designed Bloomingdale’s shopping bags, walked by St. Peter’s Church with its Vignelli-designed pipe organ visible through the window. At Vignelli Associates, I felt I was at the center of the universe."

Vignelli Associate's work was recognized by Compasso d'Oro awards (in 1964 for their Heller stacking dinnerware and 1998 for the graphic identity of COSMIT), and with a shared AIGA Gold Medal (1983) for their accomplishments and contributions to design. AIGA described their design output together as "prodigious in quantity, far-ranging in media and scope and consistent in excellence." In addition, Lella and Massimo were each individually honored with a wide range of awards and honorary degrees over the course of their lives and careers.

== Archives and legacy ==
Massimo and Lella Vignelli agreed to donate their entire design collection to Rochester Institute of Technology in 2008. The Vignelli Center For Design Studies, designed by Lella and Massimo Vignelli, houses the archive. The building, which completed in September 2010, offers exhibition spaces, classrooms, and offices among its numerous amenities. Massimo Vignelli had this to say about it:

The Vignelli Center for Design Studies will house our comprehensive archive of graphic design, furniture and objects, under the direction of R. Roger Remington, the Vignelli Distinguished Professor of Design at RIT, the center will foster studies related to Modernist design with programs and exhibitions on our work as well as other related subjects.

Massimo Vignelli died on May 27, 2014, in New York City, at the age of 83. Lella Vignelli died in her home in Manhattan on December 22, 2016, at age 82, from dementia.
