= Lella Vignelli =

Italian architect and designer (1934–2016)

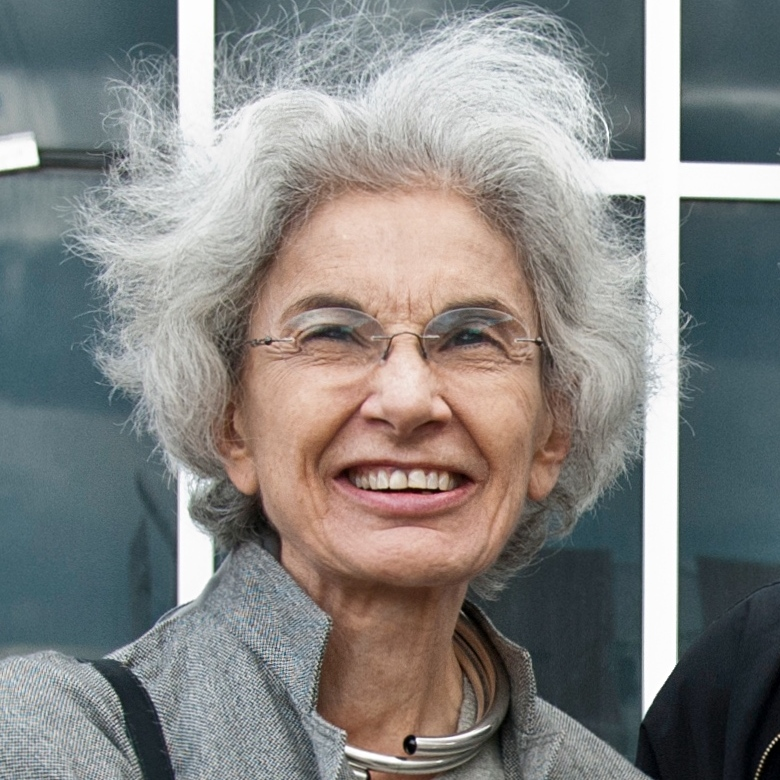
- Vignelli in 2010 at the RIT Vignelli Center
- Born: Elena Valle; August 13, 1934; Udine, Italy
- Died: December 22, 2016 (aged 82); New York City, US
- Education: Università Iuav di Venezia, Massachusetts Institute of Technology School of Architecture
- Occupations: Architect; Designer; Businesswoman
- Known for: Co-founder of Vignelli Associates and Unimark International
- Spouse: Massimo Vignelli
- Children: Luca Vignelli; Valentina Vignelli
- Awards: Presidential Design Award; National Design Award; National Arts Club Gold Medal; AIGA Gold Medal; Honorary Doctorate, Parsons School of Design; Honorary Doctorate, Corcoran School of Art

Lella Vignelli (born Elena Valle; August 13, 1934 – December 22, 2016) was an Italian architect, designer, and businesswomen. She collaborated closely throughout much of her life with her husband Massimo Vignelli, with whom she founded Vignelli Associates in 1971. She was known for the "spare, elegant style" of her architectural and industrial design work, her management skills and entrepreneurial expertise—as well as her sprezzatura or 'effortless grace'.

== Early life and education ==
Lella Vignelli was born in Udine, Italy. She was the daughter of the architect Provino Valle, and the sister of Gino Valle and Nani Valle, both also architects. She met Massimo Vignelli at an architecture convention in 1951 and they married in 1957. She received a degree in architecture the Università IUAV di Venezia, followed in 1958 by a funded fellowship as a scholar at the MIT School of Architecture. In 1962, she became a registered architect in Milan.

== Work and career ==
In the mid-1950s, Lella Vignelli's professional concentration was interior, furniture, and product design. She was also involved in the formation of the Associazione per il Disegno Industriale (ADI), an Italian professional design organization.

In 1959, she joined architecture firm Skidmore, Owings & Merrill in Chicago as a junior interior designer. The following year the Vignellis established the Massimo and Lella Vignelli Office of Design and Architecture in Milan. Lella specialized in interior architecture, furniture, exhibition, and product design.

She was one of the founders of the corporate design consultancy Unimark International, along with Massimo, Bob Noorda, and Ralph Eckerstrom. At Unimark, Lella Vignelli served as the head of the interior design department in Milan beginning in 1965, and later in New York.

Some of the Vignellis' notable designs from this period are their brand identity commissions for clients such as Knoll International, for which they led a comprehensive review of the company's visual presence starting in 1965; the graphic identity and logo of American Airlines, designed in 1967; as well the design of as a collection of melamine plastic stacking dinnerware for Articoli Plastici Elettrici (later marketed in America by Heller). The design was awarded the Compasso d'Oro in 1964, and was still in production and sold as Vignelli Stacking Dinnerware in 2023, nearly 60 years after it was first introduced.

In 1971, the Vignellis established Vignelli Associates and opened offices in New York, Paris, and Milan. As Vignelli Associates, their work included corporate identity design alongside publication, exhibition, furniture, product, jewellery, and clothing design. Lella focussed on the three-dimensional design work of the practice, and also served as Executive Vice President and later Chief Executive Officer.

The firm's commissions included corporate identity programmes for Bloomingdale's department store in 1972, Lancia automobiles in 1978, and Ducati motorcycles in 1992, as well as the signage system for the Guggenheim Museum Bilbao in 1997. Vignelli Associates was commissioned to design the graphic identity, signage systems, and subway map for the New York City Subway in 1972. The design was based on "abstract simplicity" with all of the subway lines indicated using straight, vertical, horizontal, or diagonal lines arranged at either 45 or 90 degree angles. Each subway line is indicated using a unique color, while the stops are designated with a simple black dot. This color-scheme is repeated on the corresponding colored circular icons on the signage throughout the subway system, platforms, and trains. That map was met with some criticism for being difficult to understand, although it has been described as "a cult phenomenon for generations of graphic designers".

In 1978, the Vignellis founded Vignelli Designs, a separate company which focused on product and furniture design, and for which Lella served as president. Their furniture designs included the Handkerchief chair for Knoll (1985); the Serenissimo table (1985) for Italian manufacturer Acerbis; and the Magic coffee table (1990) for Acerbis's lower-priced Morphos label. Other Vignelli designs have included retail layouts for Artemide, jewelry for Cleto Munari, and glassware for Venini and Steuben Glass Works.

LelIa Vignelli also collaborated closely with the architect Denise Scott Brown, and was a frequent speaker and juror for national and international design organizations. She was a member of the Industrial Designers Society of America (IDSA), the American Institute of Graphic Arts (AIGA), the International Furnishings and Designer Association (IFDA), and the Decorators Club of New York.

=== Corporate identity programs ===
- American Airlines, 1967
- Bloomingdale's, New York, 1972
- Knoll International graphic program, 1966–1980
- Xerox (in collaboration with Jay Doblin Associates and Jack Hough Associates) 1985–1989
- United States National Park Service, 1977
- Ciga Hotels, 1978
- Sotheby's graphic program, 1981–1982
- Park Tower Realty, 1985–1988
- Aetna Life and Casualty, 1988
- Fodor's travel guides

=== Product design ===
- Heller stacking dinnerware, 1964
- Ciga Hotels, 1978
- Handkerchief chair for Knoll, 1983

=== Packaging ===
- Bloomingdale's, 1972
- Barney's, 1977
- Saks Fifth Avenue, 1978
- IBM, 1984–1986

=== Transportation graphics ===
- New York Metropolitan Transit Authority, 1966
- Washington Metro Transportation, 1968

== Recognition and legacy ==
Lella and Massimo Vignelli were described as "iconic, impossibly exotic characters" in New York Magazine. In 1982, they were both awarded the AIGA Gold Medal for their achievements and contributions to design. The AIGA described their design output together as "prodigious in quantity, far-ranging in media and scope and consistent in excellence."

Collections holding examples of Vignelli's work include the Museum of Modern Art (MoMA) in New York, the Pompidou Centre in Paris, and the Victoria and Albert Museum (V&A) in London.

Lella Vignelli died in her home in Manhattan from dementia on December 22, 2016, at age 82.

The Triennale di Milano staged a major retrospective of the Vignelli's work in 2026. The exhibition, titled Lella and Massimo Vignelli: A Language of Clarity, was curated by Francesca Picchi, Marco Sammicheli, and Studio Mut, and designed by Jasper Morrison and David Saik. In its review of the exhibition, Domus magazine notes that "The Vignellis are not just a chapter in design history. They are an active grammar, often invisible, that continues to organize how we read information, move through spaces, and interact with objects."

=== Vignelli Center for Design Studies ===
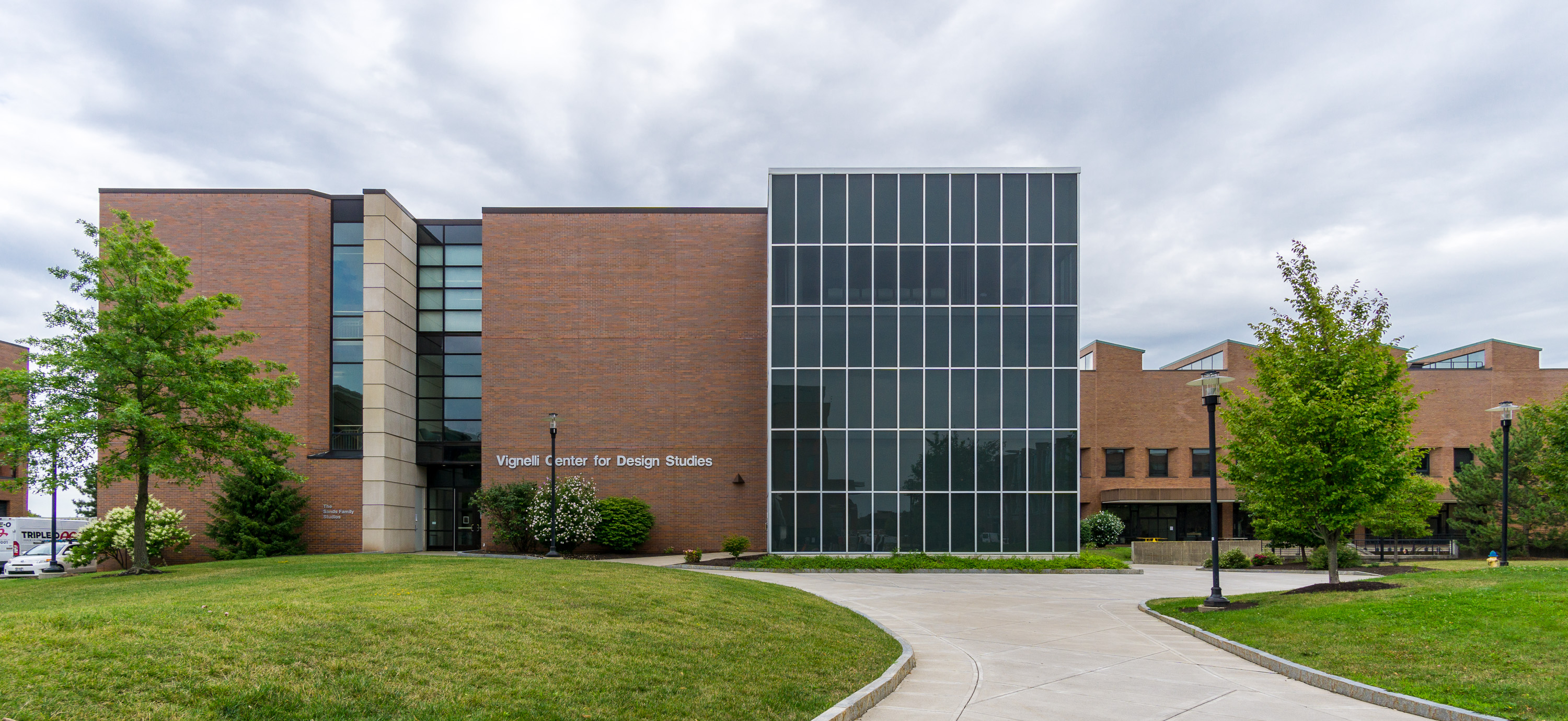
Vignelli Center for Design Studies, Rochester Institute of Technology

In 2008 Massimo and Lella Vignelli agreed to donate the entire archive of their design work to the Rochester Institute of Technology, near Rochester, New York. The archive, which contains c. 500,000 items including "sketches, prototypes, models, technical plans, correspondence, contracts, mechanicals, photographs, material samples, videos, and digital files" is held in a new building, designed by the Vignellis, called The Vignelli Center for Design Studies, which opened in September 2010. As well as display, storage, and conservation facilities for the archives, the Vignelli Center includes exhibition spaces, meeting rooms, classrooms, and offices.

=== Awards ===
Lella and Massimo's work has been recognized by a range of international awards and prizes.

- 1964 Gran Premio Triennale of Milan
- 1964 and 1989 Compasso d'Oro Awards
- 1973 American Institute of Architects (AlA) Industrial Arts Medal
- 1982 Laurea honoris causa Parsons School of Design, New York
- 1983 American Institute of Graphic Arts (AIGA) Gold Medal
- 1985 Presidential Design Award
- 1988 Interior Design Hall of Fame
- 1991 National Arts Club Gold Medal for Design
- 1992 Interior Product Designers Fellowship of Excellence
- 1994 Laurea honoris causa Corcoran School of Art, Washington D.C.
- 1995 Brooklyn Museum Design Award for Lifetime Achievement
- 2003 National Design Award for Lifetime Achievement, Cooper Hewitt, Smithsonian Design Museum, New York
- 2004 Visionary Award from the Museum of Art and Design, New York
- 2005 Architecture Award from the American Academy of Arts and Letters, New York
- 2011 President’s Medal of the Architectural League of New York
- 2011 Lifetime Achievement Award at AD 20/21

== Quotations ==
If you can't find it, design it.

— Lella and Massimo Vignelli

If you do it right, it will last forever. It's as simple as that.

— Lella Vignelli

I learned an enormous amount from Massimo about how to be a good designer. But I learned how to be a successful designer from Lella.

— Michael Bierut

== Publications ==
- Celant, Germano; Constantine, Mildred; McFadden, David Revere; Rykwert, Joseph (1990). design: Vignelli (essays) (1st. ed.). New York: Rizzoli. ISBN 978-0-8478-1140-3. OCLC 20854336.
- Vignelli, Lella; Vignelli, Massimo (2004). Design is One. Mulgrave, Victoria: Images Publishing Group Pty Ltd. ISBN 978-1-920744-52-6. OCLC 56575570.
- Vignelli, Massimo (2007). Vignelli from A to Z. (1st. ed.). Mulgrave, Victoria: Images Publishing Group Pty Ltd. ISBN 978-1-86470-176-0. OCLC 148864804.
- Vignelli, Massimo (2010). The Vignelli Canon. Baden: Lars Müller. ISBN 978-3-03-778225-5. OCLC 630456781.
- Bouabana, Samira; Tillman Sperandio, Angela (2013). Hall of Femmes: Lella Vignelli. Stockholm: Hall of Femmes. ISBN 978-91-978827-4-3. OCLC 839912875.
- Conradi, Jan (2014). Lella and Massimo Vignelli: two lives, one vision. Rochester, New York: RIT Press. ISBN 978-1-939125-07-1. OCLC 879469527.
- Vignelli, Massimo (2014). Designed by: Lella Vignelli
- Hustwit, Gary (2019). Vignelli (1st. ed.). Film First. ISBN 978-1-73414-080-4. OCLC 1145643926.
