= Vignelli Center for Design Studies =

Research and archival facility at the Rochester Institute of Technology

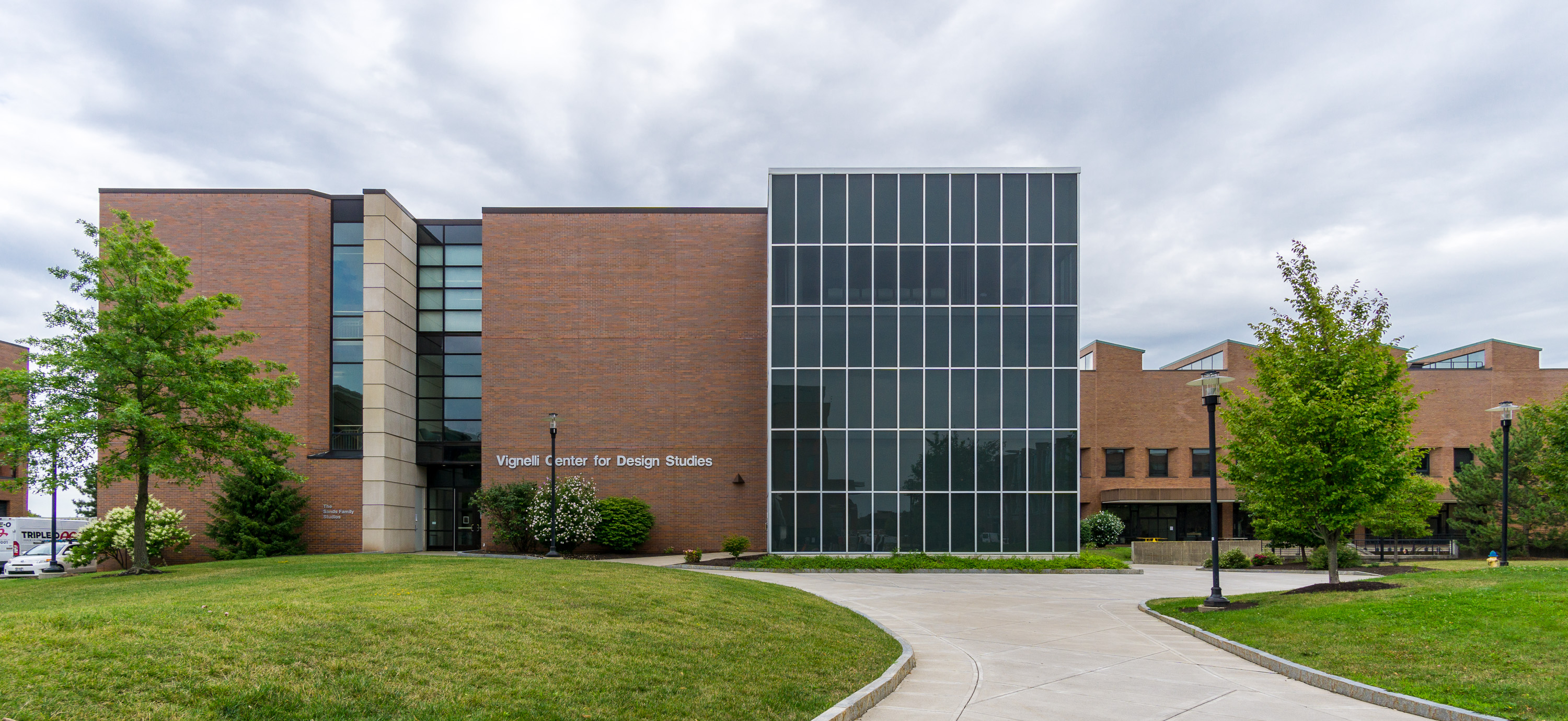
- The Vignelli Center is located in Booth Hall
- Parent institution: Rochester Institute of Technology
- Established: September 16, 2010; 14 years ago
- Director: Josh Owen
- Key people: Jennifer Whitlock (archivist)
- Location: Rochester, New York, U.S.
- Website: rit.edu/vignellicenter

The Vignelli Center for Design Studies, established in 2010, is a college of design at the Rochester Institute of Technology. Named after the New York City based Italian designers, Massimo and Lella Vignelli, this 15,500 square foot facility also holds the archives of their work as Vignelli Associates.

== History ==
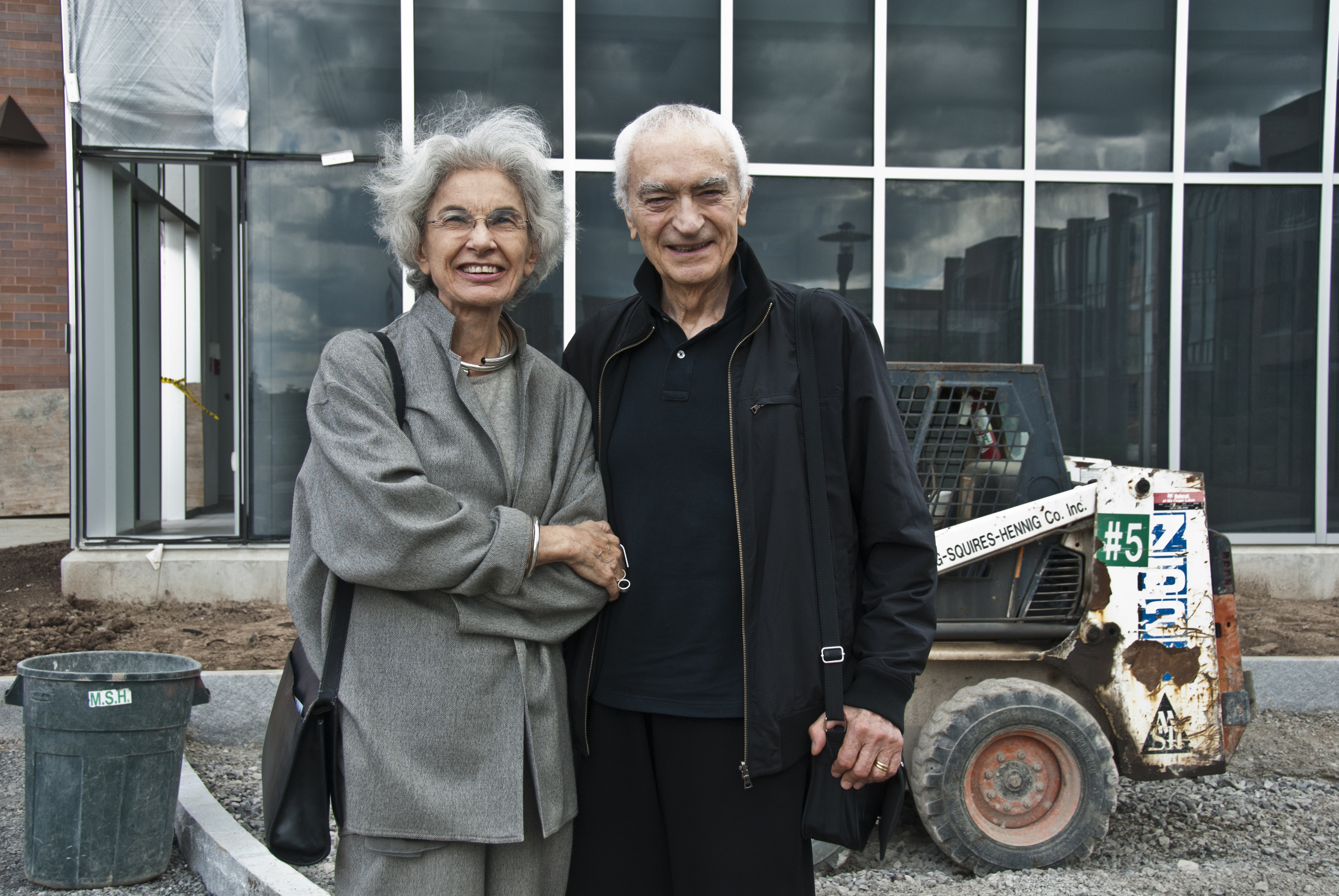
Massimo and Lella Vignelli in front of the Vignelli Center

The Vignelli Center for Design was created after Massimo and Lella Vignelli decided, in 2008, to donate the entire archive of their design work to Rochester Institute of Technology. A groundbreaking event took place on October 7, 2008, and the grand opening was held on September 16, 2010.

== Programs ==
Programs offered at the Vignelli Center for Design include graphic design, industrial design, interior design, new media design and imaging and computer graphics design. The college also has international exchange programs with the Anhalt University of Applied Sciences in Dessau, Germany, and in Copenhagen, Denmark.

== Collections ==
The Vignelli Collection is an archive of all of the couple's work over the past 50 years, including their ventures into graphic programs, publication design and packaging, transportation design, furniture, product, and exhibition design, jewelry, silverware, and even clothing.

Other than the Vignelli collection, the college also includes work from Unimark International (where the Vignellis worked prior to starting their own firm), and boasts 35 collections of modernist graphic designers such as Lester Beall, Will Burtin, Cipe Pineles, William Golden and Alvin Lustig, which the university had begun to collect from the mid-1980s.

While the archives are primarily for the research and study purposes, they are also open for public viewing.

== See also ==
- List of university art museums and galleries in New York state
