= Jay Doblin =

American industrial designer (1920–1989)

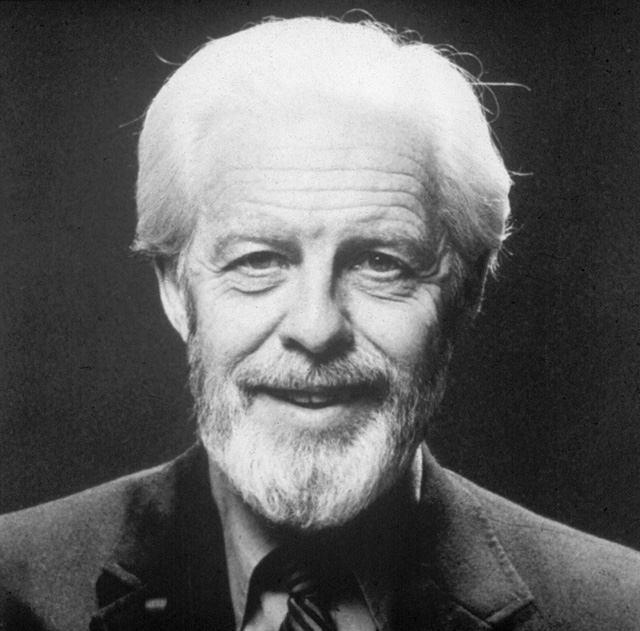
- Jay Doblin portrait
- Born: December 10, 1920
- Died: May 11, 1989 (aged 68)
- Education: Pratt Institute
- Occupations: Product Designer (1942–1954), Raymond Loewy & Associates; Dean (1955–1969), IIT Institute of Design; Co-founder (1964–1972), Unimark International; Co-founder (1978–1985), Jay Doblin & Associates
- Years active: 1942–1988
- Notable work: JC Penney "Good, Better, Best"; Alcoa aluminum chair

Jay Doblin (December 10, 1920 – May 11, 1989) was an American industrial designer and educator, best known for his contribution to the field of design in particular his work related to systems thinking, design methods and design theory in general. Throughout his professional career he worked with some of the most important design firms of their time, including Raymond Loewy Associates, Lippincott & Margulies, and Unimark International, which he founded together with Massimo Vignelli and Bob Noorda.

Doblin was born in Brooklyn, NY and graduated from Pratt Institute in 1942. He worked for Raymond Loewy from 1942 to 1955 directing the Frigidaire account and designing vending machines for Coca-Cola, razors for Schick and fountain pens for Eversharp. Between 1955 and 1969, and after the resignation of Serge Chermayeff, he served as director of the IIT Institute of Design, a design school founded in 1937 in Chicago by László Moholy-Nagy, a former Bauhaus teacher. After his tenure as director, he stayed involved with school as a professor. Doblin was president of The American Society of Industrial designers (ASID) in 1956 and of the Industrial Design Educators Association (IDEA) in 1962. In 1981 he founded his strategic design planning consultancy, Doblin with Larry Keeley. In 2004, Jay Doblin was awarded the medal of the AIGA. Doblin became part of Monitor Group's innovation practice in 2007, and was acquired by Deloitte in 2013.

== Writings ==
- "The position of crafts in America today" by Jay Doblin. Paper for the National Conference of American Craftsmen's Council (1957)
- "The 100 'Best Designed' Products." Print, (April 1959), Fortune (magazine).
- "Less Cleverness, More Communication." Print, (May 1, 1962).
- "Trademark Design" by Jay Doblin. Article published for issue #2 of Dot Zero magazine (1966)
- "Mass Media: the Stimulation System" by Jay Doblin. Article published for issue #3 of Dot Zero magazine (spring 1967)
- "One Hundred Great Product Designs" by Jay Doblin. Van Nost. Reinhold (1970)
- "Perspective: A new system for designers" by Jay Doblin. Whitney Library of Design (1970)
- "Chicago Bauhaus: Past, Present and Future" by Jay Doblin. Speech given at a symposium honoring the 25th anniversary of the Institute of Design's merger with Illinois Institute of Technology (1974).
- "Innovation: A Cook Book Approach." White paper, Doblin Group, (September 1978).
- "Volume Retailing in Britain. Does it undermine quality in the design and manufacture of home-produced consumer goods?" by Jay Doblin. RSA Journal Volume 128 (1979)
- "A Brief Tussle with Corporate Identity: A Draft for the Design Management Institute."White Paper, Doblin Group, (July 1979).
- Doblin, Jay (September 1980). "Volume Retailing in Britain: Does it undermine quality in the design and manufacture of home-produced consumer goods?". Journal of the Royal Society of Arts. 128 (5290): 633–646. JSTOR 41373152.
- "What designers do" by Jay Doblin. Designer (June 1980)
- "Perceptual maps: one aid to product planning." ID Magazine (November December 1980): 20–25.
- "The Map of Media: Understanding the Contexts for Communications." ID Magazine (January February 1981): 35–37.
- "The Union of Intuitive and Logical Design." Innovation: The Journal of the Industrial Designers Society of America (Fall 1982): 4–7.
- "Reflections on Industrial Design Past, Present and Future." Innovation: The Journal of the Industrial Designers Society of America (Spring 1983): 12–14.
- "DesMod (Design Model)" by Jay Doblin. Unpublished Design Theory Lecture Handout: Institute of Design Illinois Institute of Technology (1984)
- "An Irreverent Look at Logotypes and Brandmarks." STA Design Journal (February 1985): 34–39.
- "Information and Design – The Essential Relation." In Design in the Information Environment, edited by Patrick Whitney, 18–30. Carbondale and Edwardsville: Southern Illinois University Press, (1985).
- "A short grandiose theory of design" by Jay Doblin. Article published in the 1987 Society of Typographic Arts Design Journal (1987)
- "Discrimination: The special skills required for seeing, and the curious structure of judgement" by Jay Doblin. Design Processes Newsletter, Vol. 2, No.4, Institute of Design, Illinois Institute of Technology, Chicago, IL, U.S.A. (1987)
- “A structure for nontextual communications.” In Processing of Visible Language 2, edited by Paul A. Kohlers, Merald E. Wrolstad, and Herman Bouma, 89–111. New York: Plenum Publishing Corporation, (1987).
- “How Designers Should Use Computers.” Whitepaper, Doblin Keeley Malin Stamos. (Reprinted July 1990).
- “From Bauhaus to Unimark: A Pilgrim’s Progress for Design.” Whitepaper, Doblin Keeley Malin Stamos. (Reprinted July 1990).

== Quotes ==
- "A product is frozen information"
- "The reason to have a design firm is to have lunch every day with interesting people"
- "Ignorance this monumental is difficult to overcome" (when speaking about how people mixed their understanding of different disciplines of design)
