= Mario Bellini =

Italian architect & designer (born 1935)

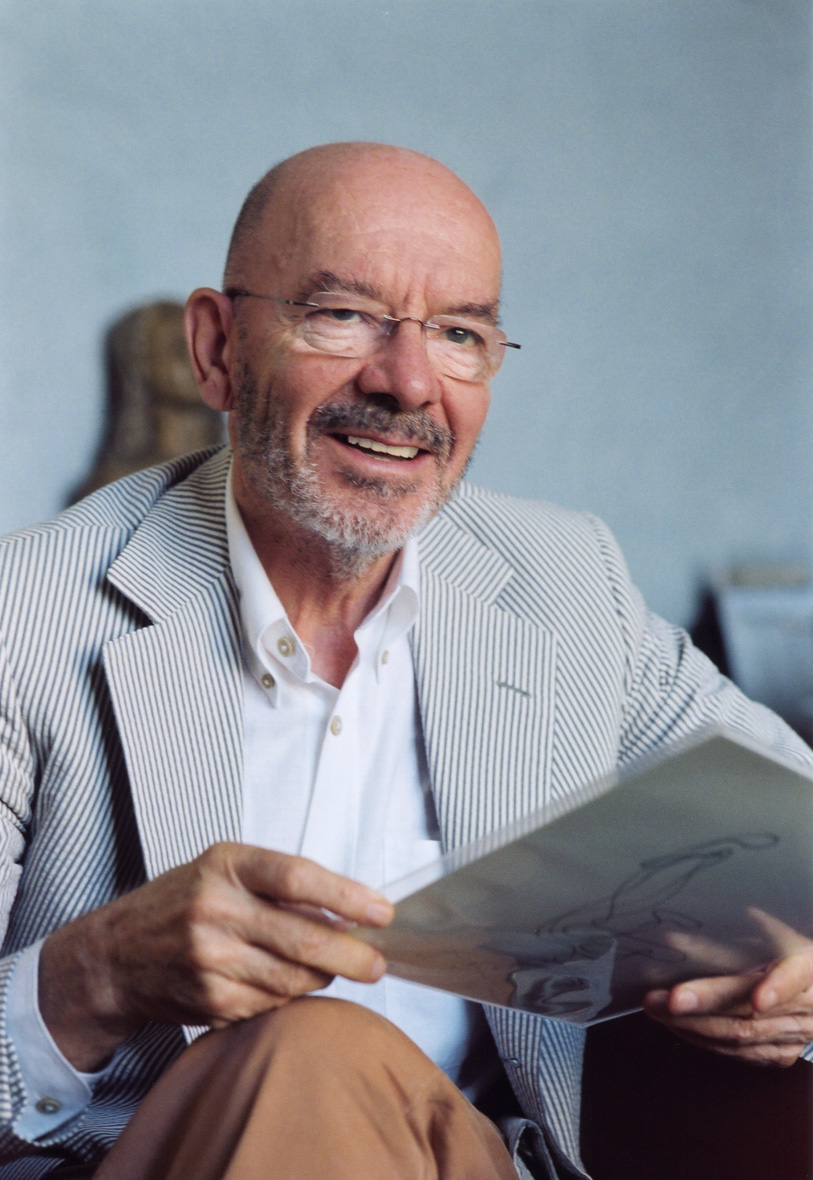
- Mario Bellini
- Born: 1 February 1935 (age 91); Milan, Italy
- Education: Milan Polytechnic – Faculty of Architecture
- Occupations: Architect and designer
- Notable work: Museum of Islamic Art, Louvre Museum, Paris; Deutsche Bank Headquarters refurbishment, Frankfurt; Milan Convention Center (MICO), Milan
- Awards: Compasso d'Oro; Medaglia d'Oro

Mario Bellini (born 1 February 1935) is an Italian architect and designer. After graduating from the Polytechnic University of Milan in 1959, he pursued a career in architecture, exhibition design, product design, and furniture design during the Italian economic boom in the late 20th century. He has worked with companies such as B&B Italia, Brionvega, Cassina, Heller, Flou, Yamaha, Olivetti, Renault, Rosenthal, Tecno, Riva 1920, Vitra, and Kartell.

In a career spanning nearly 70 years, Bellini has received many honours, including eight Compasso d'Oro awards and the Gold Medal for Lifetime Achievement from the Triennale di Milano. In 2019, the President of the Italian Chamber of Deputies, Roberto Fico, awarded him a career medal in recognition of his contributions to Italian architecture and design.

== Industrial design ==
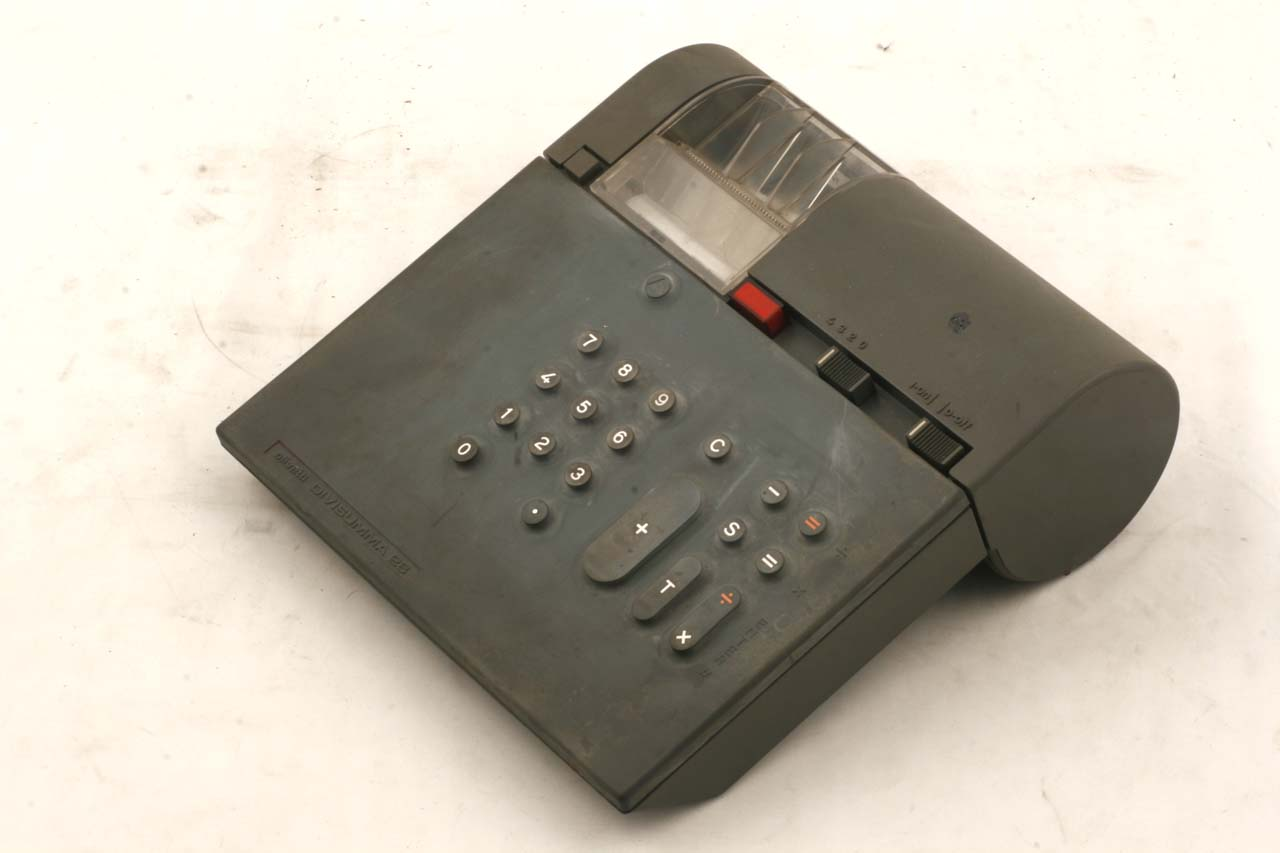
Olivetti Divisumma 28 (1972)

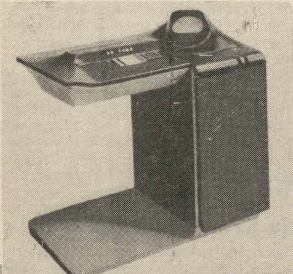
Olivetti TCV 250 Video Display Terminal (1966)

In 1963, Bellini became a consultant for Olivetti, where he contributed to the design of the Programma 101, a precursor to the desktop computer. His design for the CMC7-7004 magnetic character marking machine won the Compasso d'Oro in 1964, and his design for the TCV 250 Video Display Terminal is on display at the Museum of Modern Art. Bellini continued working with Olivetti throughout the 1970s and 1980s, playing a key role in designing many of the company's iconic products. These included the Lexicon 82 and Praxis 35 electric typewriters (the latter of which won a Compasso d'Oro in 1981), the Mercator 20 cash register (which also received the Compasso d'Oro in 1984), and the Divisumma 28 electronic printing calculator.

For many years, Bellini designed furniture and systems for B&B Italia and Cassina. He also created TV sets, hi-fi systems, headphones, and electric organs for Yamaha. As an automobile design consultant, he worked with Renault for five years and also contributed to designs for Fiat and Lancia, including the interior of the 1980 Lancia Trevi. Additionally, he designed lamps for Artemide, Erco, and Flos, as well as office furniture for Vitra.

Bellini has also designed products for various companies worldwide and continues to collaborate with many of them. In Italy, his work includes designs for Acerbis, Bras, Driade, Candy, Castilia, Flou, Kartell, Marcatrè, Meritalia, Natuzzi, and Poltrona Frau. In Belgium, he has worked with Ideal Standard; in Germany, with Lamy and Rosenthal; in Japan, with Fuji and Zojirushi; and in the United States, with Heller Furniture.

In 1972, Bellini was commissioned to design and build the prototype of the Kar-a-Sutra, a mobile environment created for the exhibition Italy: The New Domestic Landscape at the Museum of Modern Art in New York. His Camaleonda modular sofa system, produced by B&B Italia until 1979, was also featured in the exhibition.

In 1987, the Museum of Modern Art held a retrospective exhibition dedicated to Bellini's career. At the time, the museum already featured 25 of his works in its permanent collection, including a selection of Olivetti machines, furniture designed in collaboration with B&B Italia and Cassina, and office chairs created for Vitra.

In 2025, Bellini's Olivetti TCV 250 video display terminal was included in Pirouette: Turning Points in Design, an exhibition at the Museum of Modern Art featuring "widely recognized design icons [...] highlighting pivotal moments in design history."

=== Gallery of design works ===
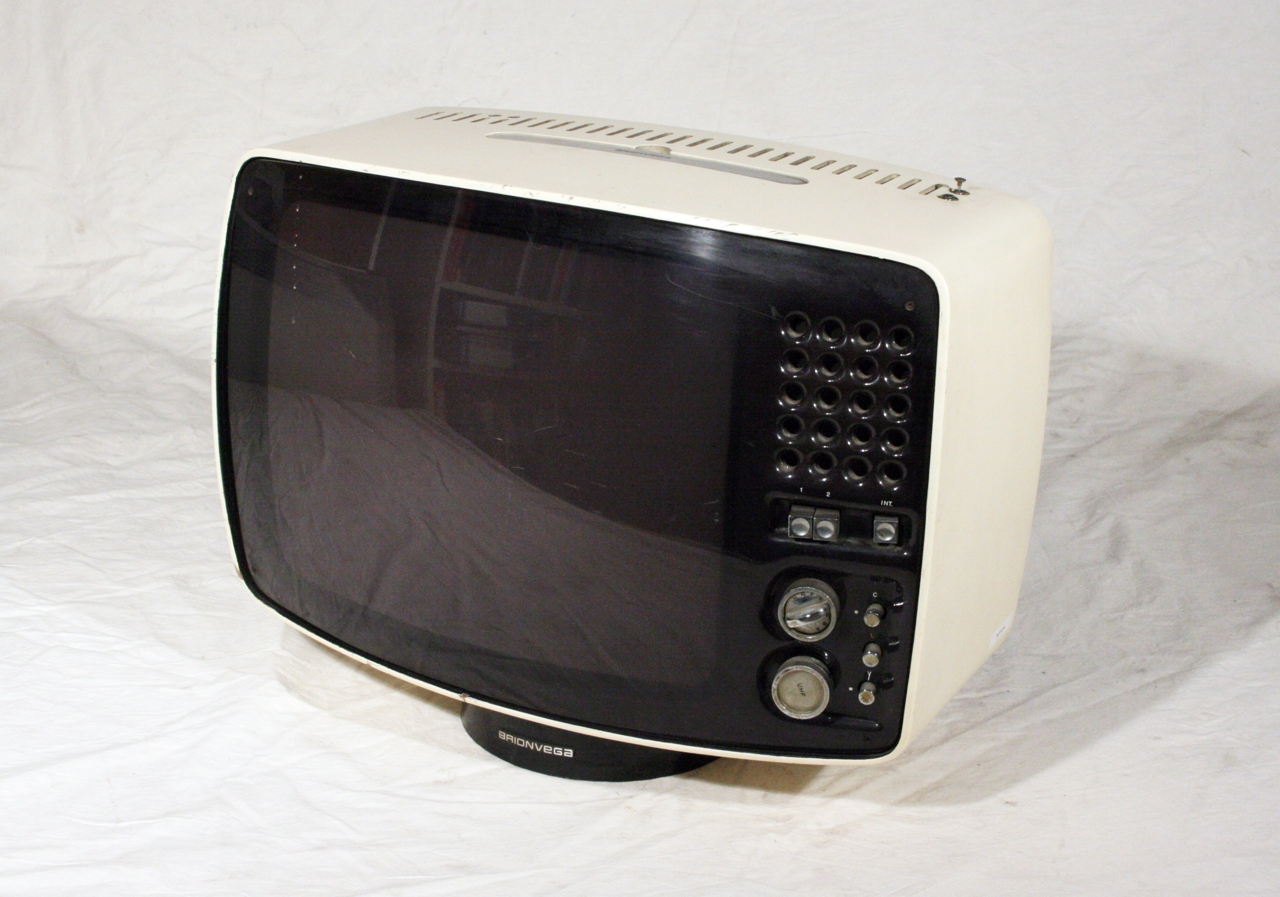
Volans 17 television for Brionvega (1968)

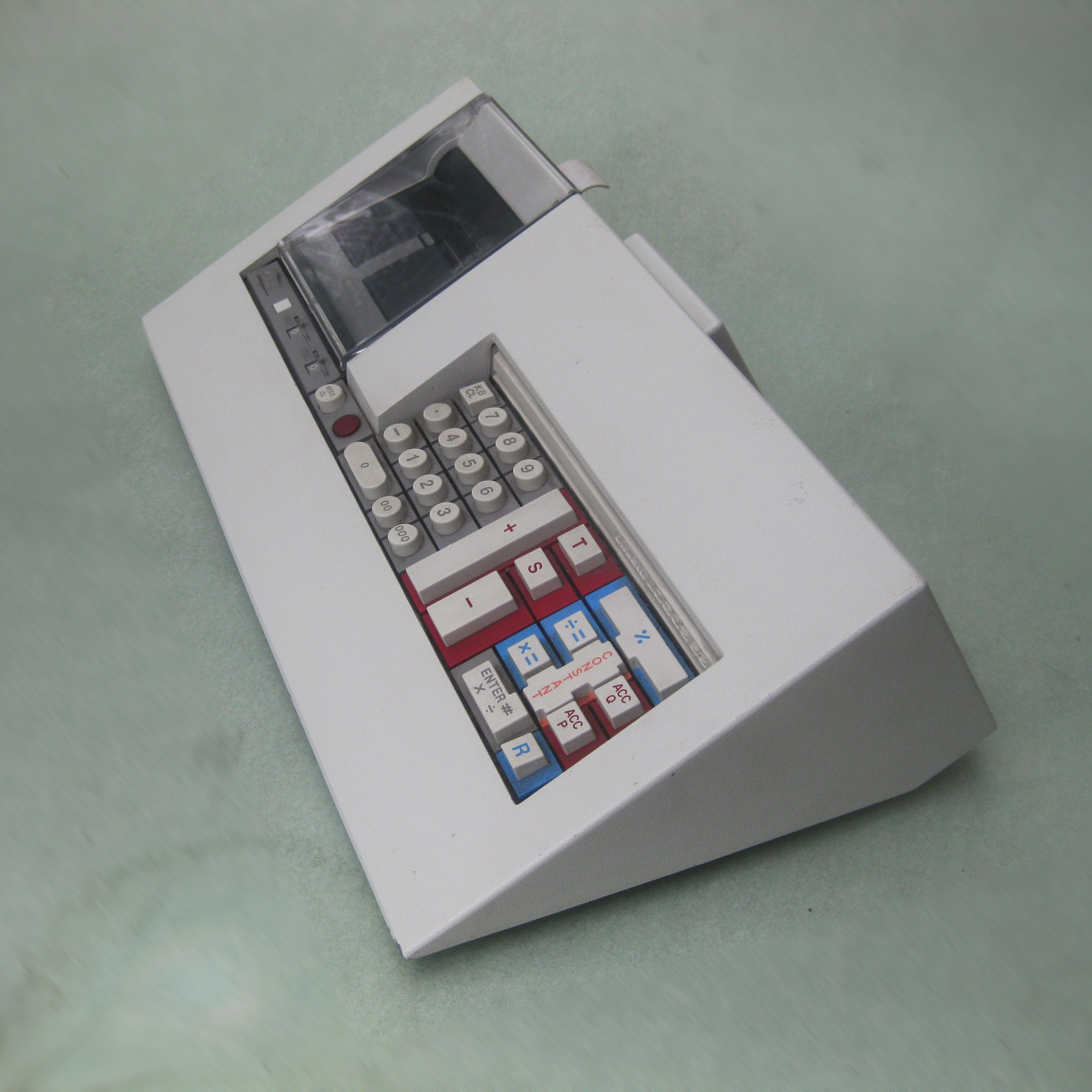
Logos 58 calculator designed for Olivetti (1972)

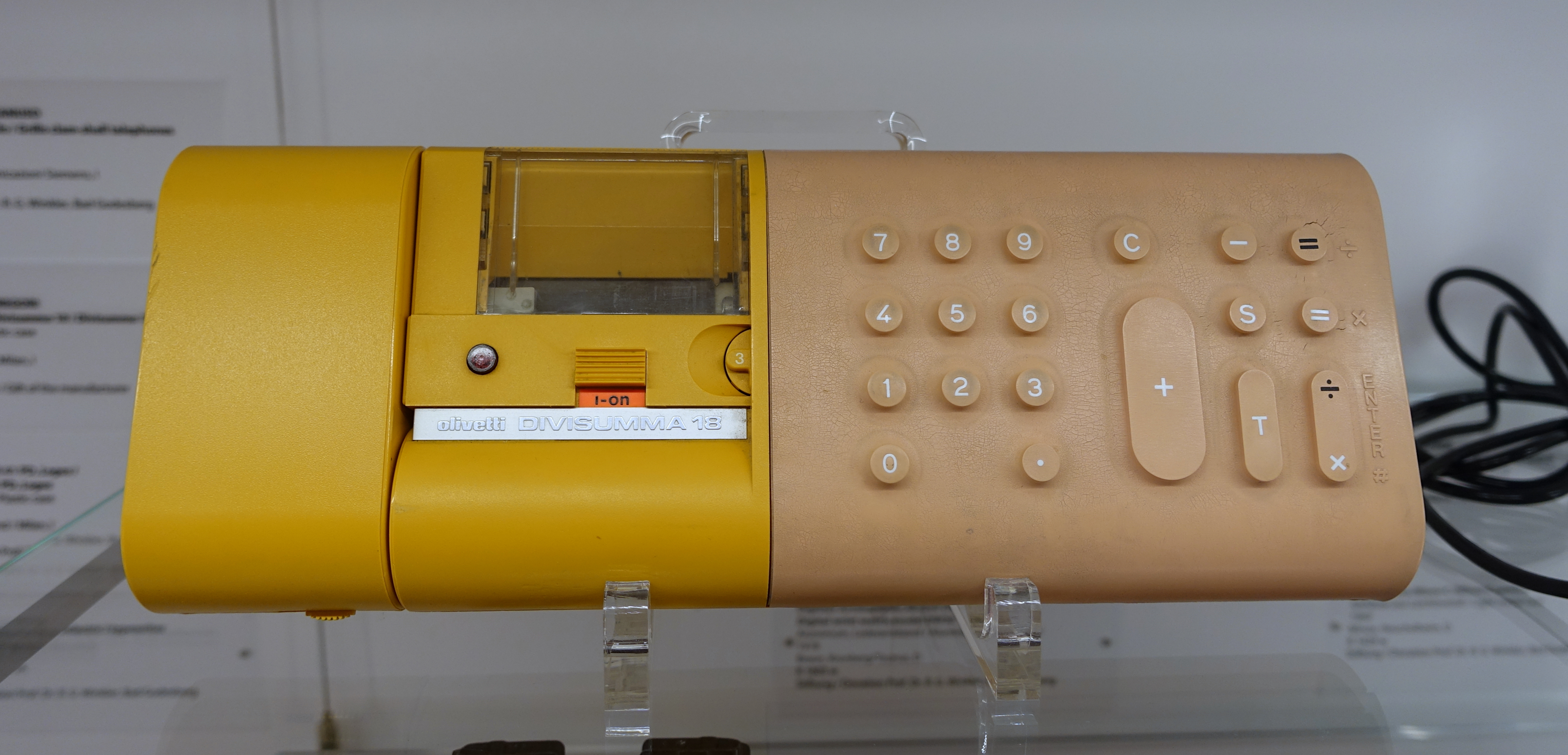
Olivetti Divisumma 18 calculator (1973)

Olivetti Lettera 35i

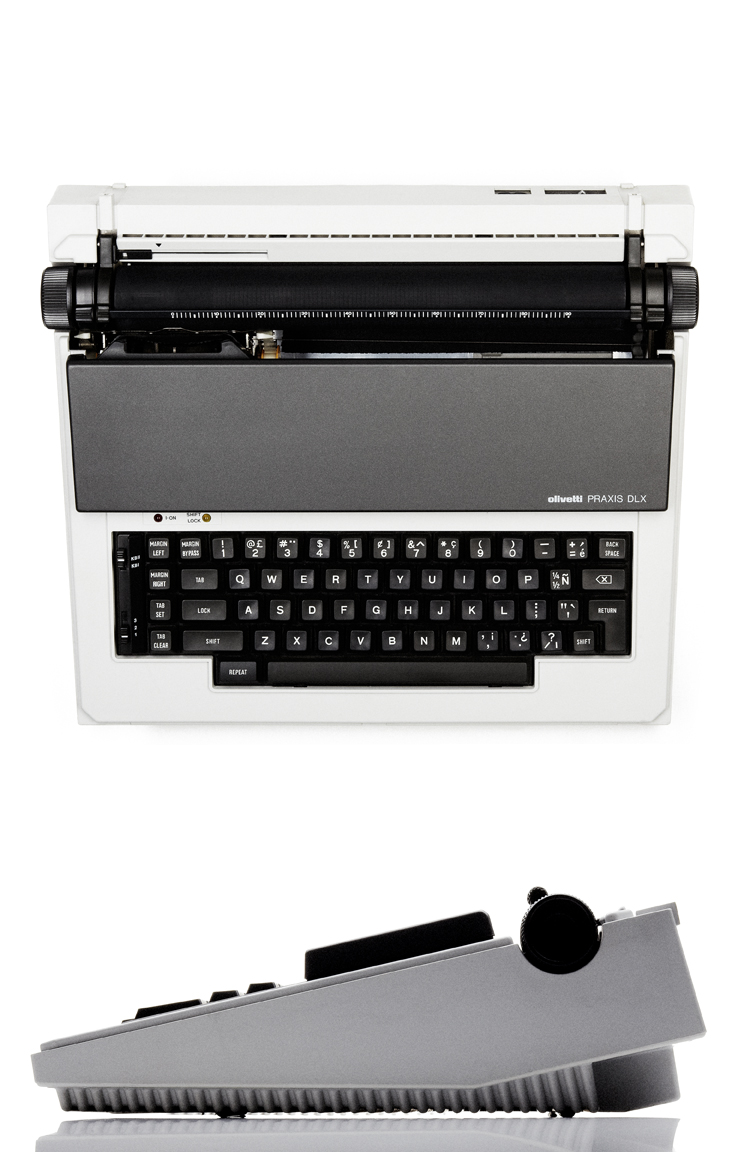
Olivetti Lettera Praxis DLX

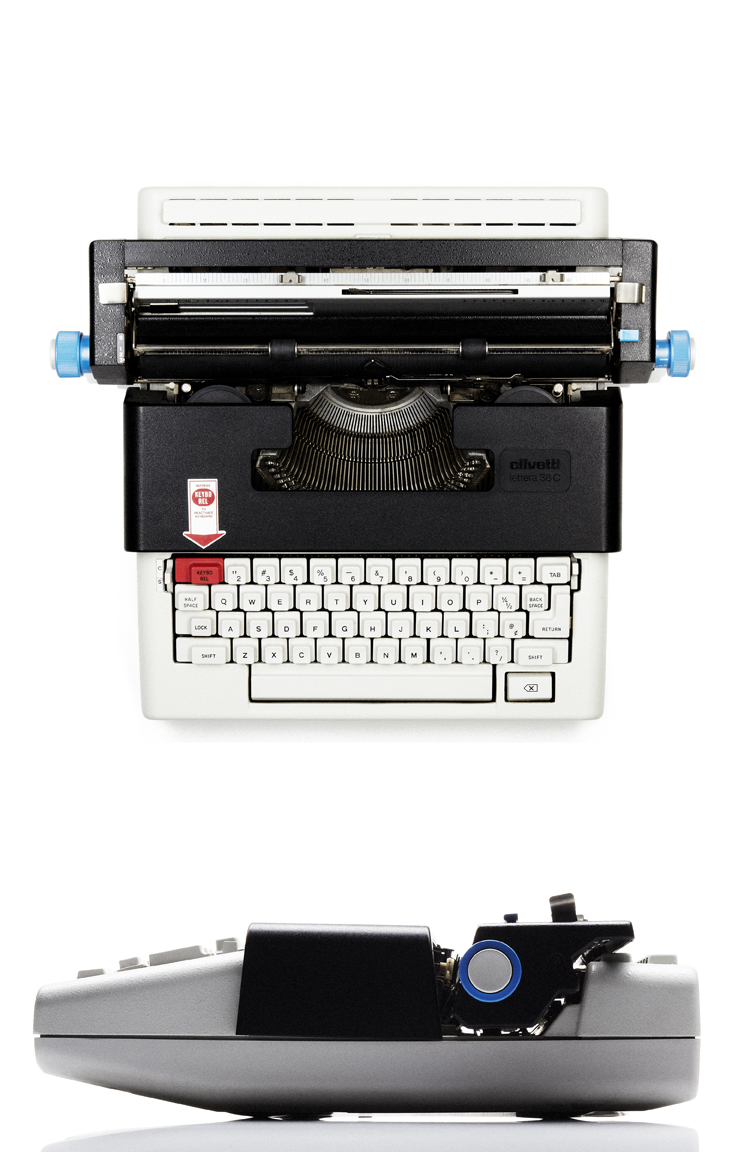
Olivetti Lettera 36c

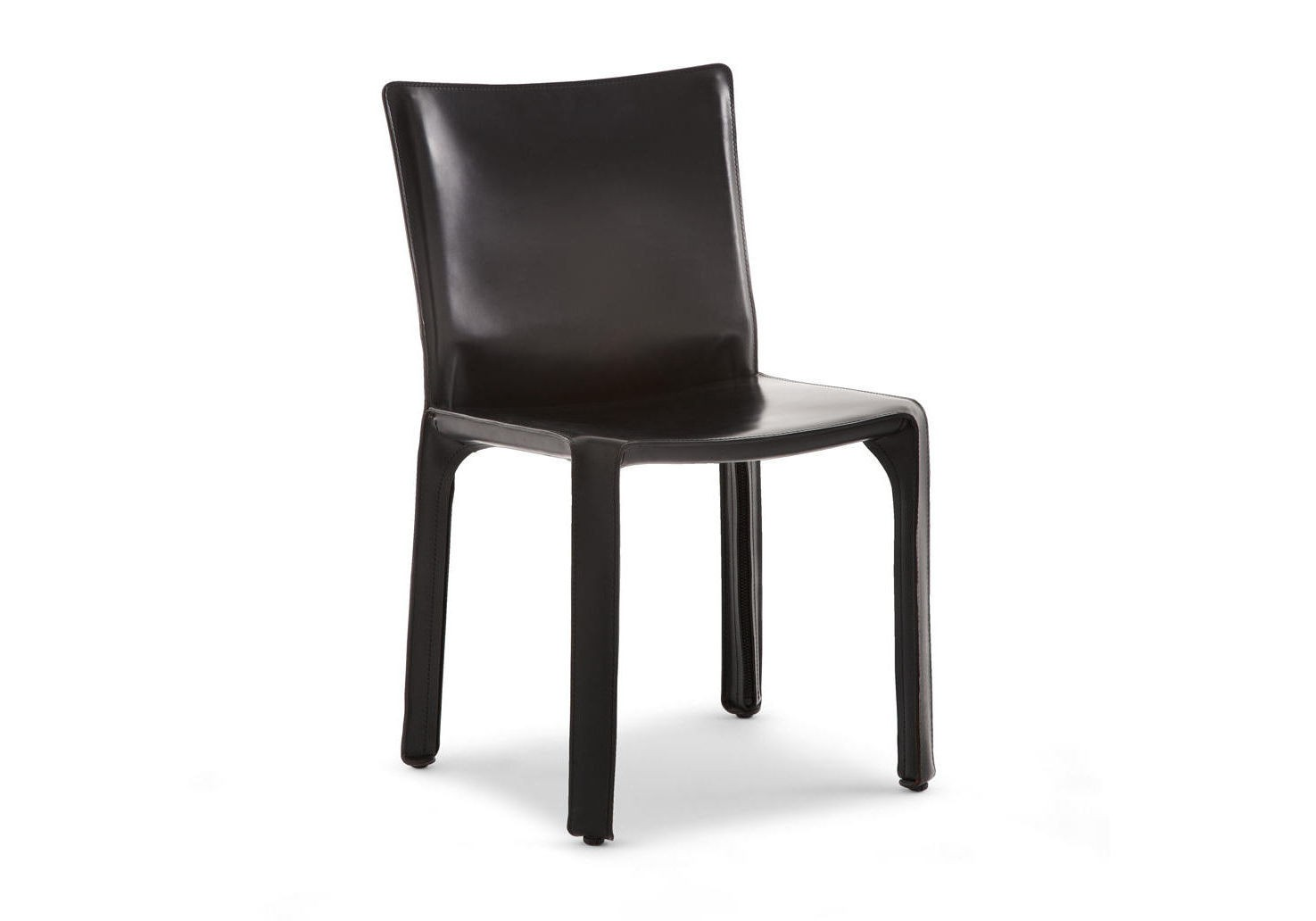
412 Cab chair designed for Cassina (1977)

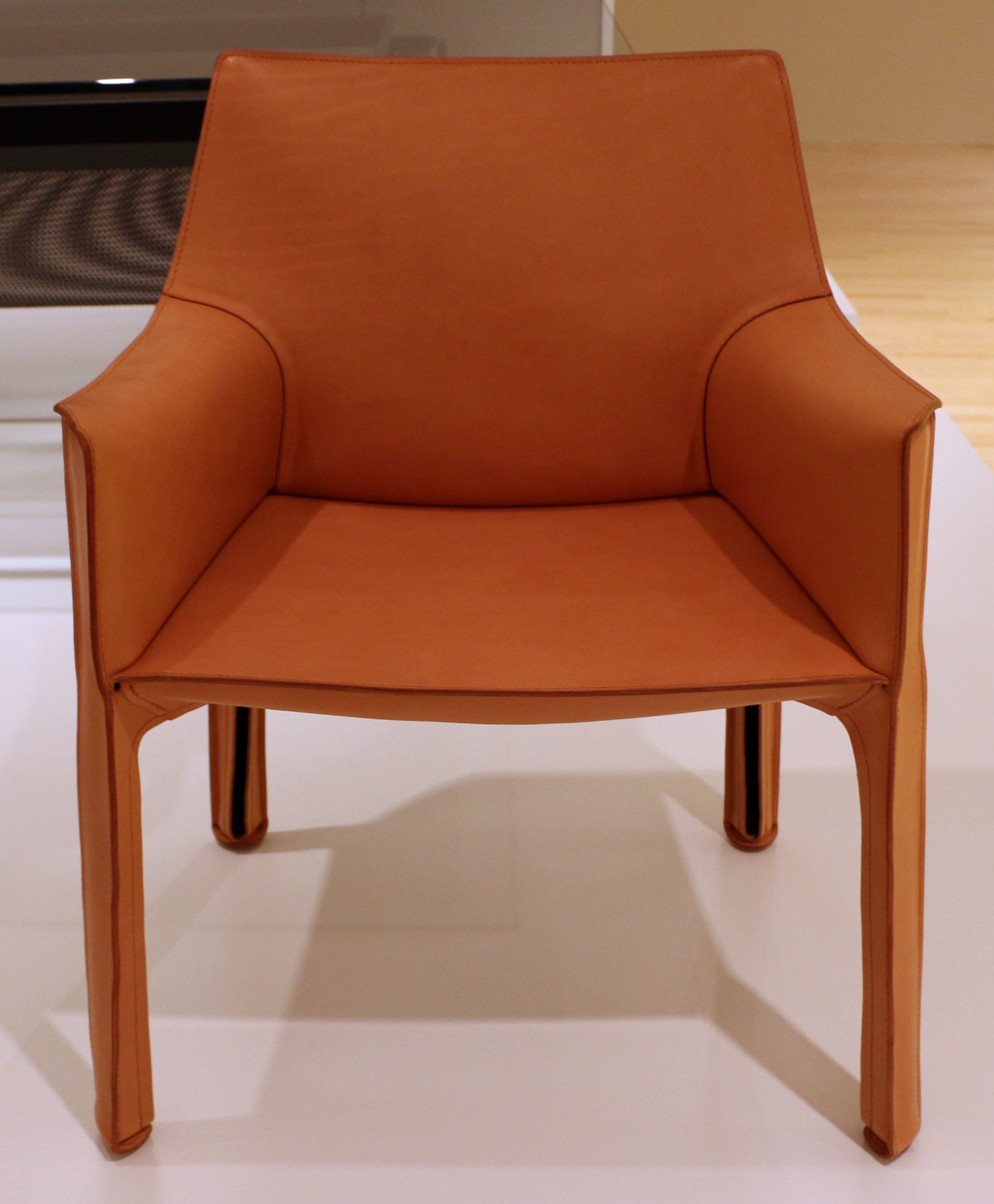
Cab chair designed for Cassina (1977)

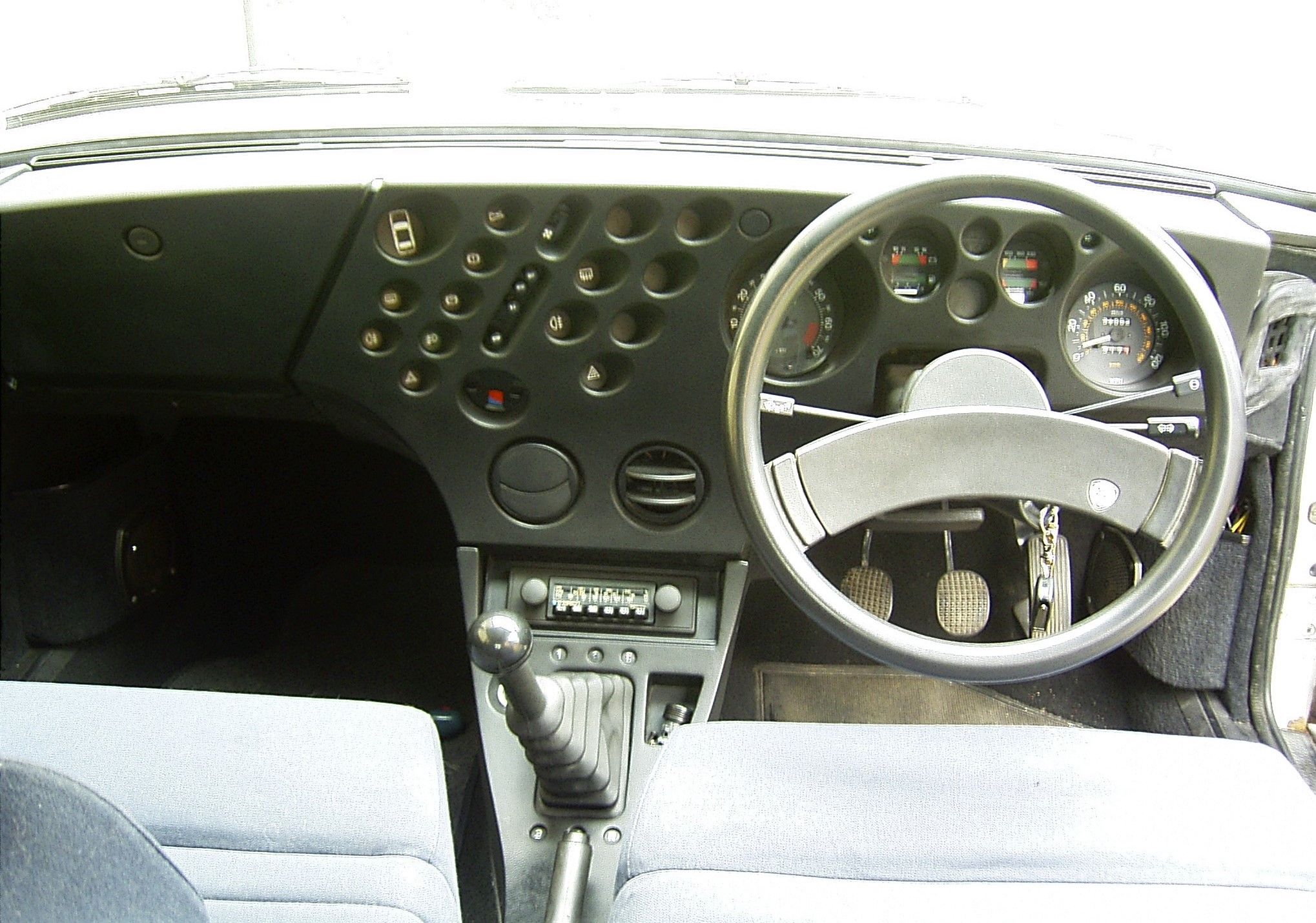
Ergonomic Dashboard for Lancia Trevi (1980)

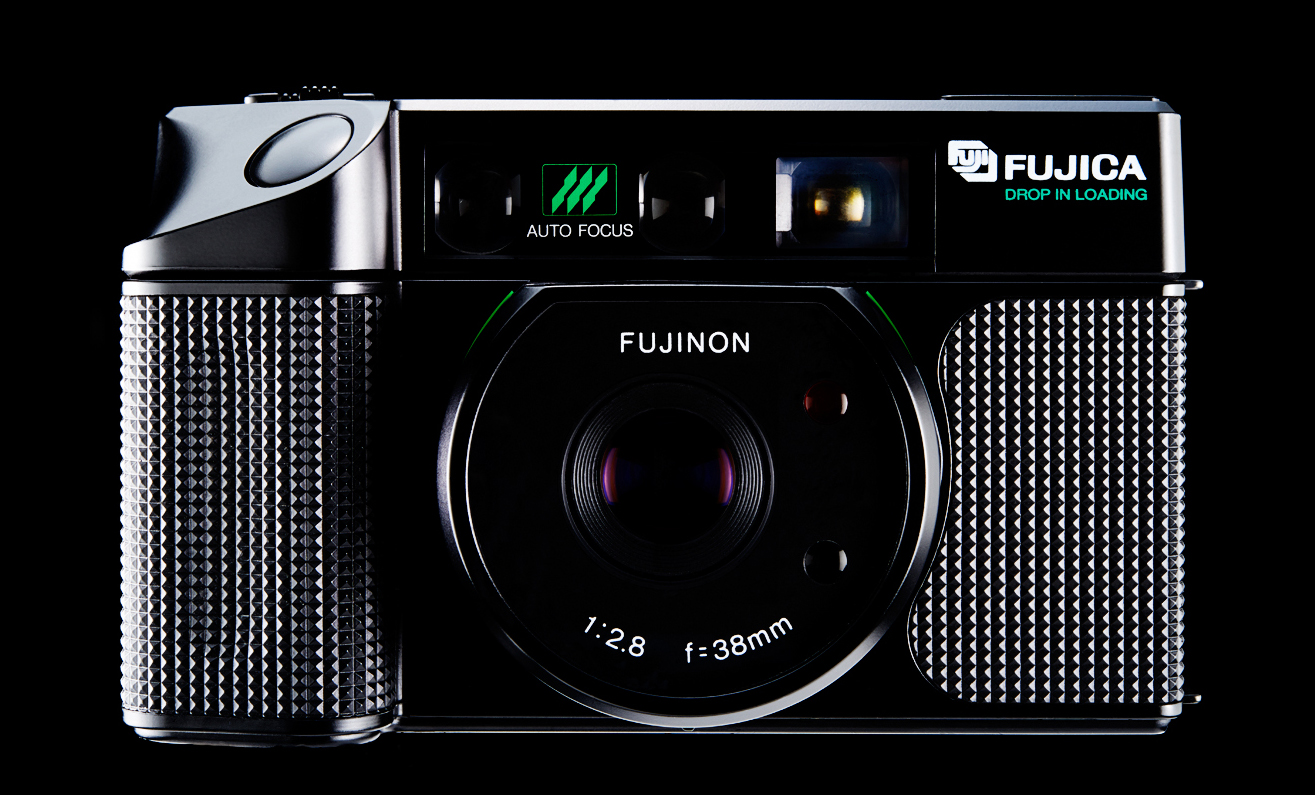
DL 100 camera designed for Fuji

== Architecture ==
Since the 1980s, Bellini has designed buildings across Europe, Japan, the United States, Australia, and the United Arab Emirates. His firm, Mario Bellini Architects (MBA), is headquartered in Milan in a 1,500-square-meter building designed by Bellini himself in the early 1990s. In 1999, the firm obtained ISO 9001 quality certification. Today, MBA employs an average of 30 to 35 architects.

Projects built

- Milan Convention Centre (MICO), one of Europe's largest convention centres, 2008–2012
- Museum of Islamic Arts at Louvre Museum, Paris, 2005–2012
- Museum of the City of Bologna, Italy, 2004–2012
- Urban redevelopment “Verona Forum”, Verona, Italy, 2004–2011
- Radical refurbishment of the Deutsche Bank in Frankfurt, Germany, 2007–2011
- National Gallery of Victoria extension and redevelopment, Melbourne, Australia, 1996–2003
- Essen International Fair Extension, Germany, 1998–2001
- Natuzzi Americas Headquarters, High Point, North Carolina, USA, 1996–1998
- Arsoa Co./Cosmetics- Headquarters, Yamanashi, Japan, 1996–1998
- New fair district of the Milan Trade Fair, 1987–1997
- Risonare Vivre Club Complex, Kobuchizawa, Japan, 1989–1992
- Tokyo Design Center, Tokyo, Japan, 1988–1992
- Yokohama Business Park, Yokohama, Japan, 1987–1991
- Villa Erba Exhibition and Congress Centre, Cernobbio (Como), 1986–1990
- Thermoelectric power plant of Cassano d’Adda office building, 1985–1990

Projects under construction

- Architectural project of a large Scientific-Technological Park at Erzelli Hill, Genoa, Italy, 2005
- Extension and redevelopment of the Pinacoteca di Brera Milan (one of the major Italian art galleries), 2009
- New Cultural Centre of Turin, 2001

Among the best architectural creations

- New Museum of the City of Berlin, Germany, 2008
- Sheikh Zayed National Museum International Competition, Abu Dhabi, UAE, 2007
- European Patent Office, L’Aja, Holland, 2004
- Cittanova 2000, Modena, Italy, 2003
- Redevelopment of the City Centre of Tianjin, China, 2003
- Banca CR Firenze New H.Q., Italy, 2003
- New International Trade Fair of Milan – Rho/Pero, Milan, 2002
- Multifunctional Complex “MAB. Zeil Project”, Frankfurt, Germany, 2002
- Stolitza Towers, Moscow, 1996
- Dubai Creek Complex, Dubai, United Arab Emirates, 1994
- Goshikidai Marine Resort, Japan, 1993

== Exhibitions ==
Bellini has designed the exhibition spaces for numerous art exhibitions, including:

- "The Treasure of St. Marco in Venice", Grand Palais, Paris, and the major museums around the world, 1984–1987
- "Italian Art in the 20th Century", Royal Academy of Arts, London, 1989
- "The Renaissance from Brunelleschi to Michelangelo. The Representation of Architecture", Palazzo Grassi, Venice, then in Paris and Berlin, 1994–1995
- "The Triumphs of Baroque. Architecture in Europe 1600–1750", Stupinigi Hunting Palace, Turin, 1999
- "Christopher Dresser. A designer at the Court of Queen Victoria", Triennale, Milan, 2001
- “Annisettanta. Il decennio lungo del secolo breve”, Triennale, 2007–2008
- “Magnificenza e Progetto” Palazzo Reale, Milan, 2008–2009

== Solo exhibitions ==
- In 1987, the Museum of Modern Art in New York organised an exhibition titled Mario Bellini: Designer.
- In 1996, the Royal Institute of British Architects (RIBA) hosted an exhibition showcasing Bellini's work as an architect.
- In 2000, the Municipal Gallery of Contemporary Art in Trento, Italy, held a personal exhibition titled Mario Bellini: A Path Between Architecture, Furniture, and Cars.
- In December 2003, the National Gallery of Victoria in Melbourne reopened with a major exhibition on his work.
