= Pino Tovaglia =

Italian graphic designer (1923–1977)

- Born: 3 December 1923; Milan, Italy
- Died: 30 November 1977 (aged 53); Milan, Italy
- Occupation: Graphic designer

Pino Tovaglia (3 December 1923 – 30 November 1977) was an Italian graphic designer. He is regarded as one of the major exponents of the Swiss Style in Italy.

Born in Milan, Tovaglia was active in the field of graphic design since his youth, first as an assistant of Carlo Carrà, and then as a collaborator of Marco Zanuso, Giò Ponti, and the Castiglioni brothers. From 1946 he was professor of graphic design in several art schools of Milan.

In 1954 Tovaglia won the National Prize of Advertising thanks to an advertisement series made for Finmeccanica. In 1956 he founded the NCPT Studio together with Giulio Confalonieri, Ilio Negri and Michele Provinciali. In 1958 he won the Golden Palm at the Cannes Lions International Advertising Festival.

From 1967 to 1970 Tovaglia was art director of Pirelli, and in the same period he realized famous posters such as Italia da salvare (1967), Cinturato Pirelli (1967) and Brandy Stock (1970). In 1972 he realized the restyling of the Alfa Romeo logo, while in 1975 he designed the symbol of the Lombardy Region in collaboration with Bruno Munari, Bob Noorda and Roberto Sambonet.

A member of Alliance Graphique Internationale, in 1998 he was awarded a posthumous Compasso d'Oro for his career. A collection consisting in over 13,000 pieces is kept at the CSAC (Study Center and Archives of Communication) of the University of Parma, and several of his works are part of the permanent collection at MoMa, New York.
