= Unimark International =

International design agency

Unimark International was an international design firm headquartered in Chicago, Illinois. It was founded in 1965 by seven partners: Ralph Eckerstrom, Lella and Massimo Vignelli, Bob Noorda, James Fogelman, Wally Gutches, and Larry Klein. Although they were not listed as founding partners, Jay Doblin and Robert Moldafsky joined the new firm almost immediately. Initially, Unimark had three offices: Chicago, Milan and New York. Later, a London office was opened in Dover Street and was run by Jan Stael von Holstein. The American branches were founded by Vignelli and his wife Lella, who subsequently founded Vignelli Associates. Additional offices opened around the world, but these were often short-lived as the client base and funding varied, and as American and global economic issues influenced the viability of each office.

Unimark downsized dramatically in 1972 and filed for final Chapter 11 bankruptcy in 1977, with the company ceasing to exist. Although the firm was relatively short-lived, it was at one time the largest design firm in the world, and it had a major influence on the direction of American design aesthetics. The firm was a leader in establishing a modernist philosophical direction for corporate design that is still widely followed. Former Bauhaus designer Herbert Bayer was an early member of the firm's Board of Directors. The graphic style of Unimark's projects was decidedly modernist. Unimark rejected the idea of the designer-as-artist, embraced standardization and systems and emphasizing the use of the grid as an organizational tool for corporate communications. The typeface Helvetica was widely, though not exclusively, used by Unimark designers.

The firm was an early specialist in designing corporate identity systems, branding, and signage systems. Clients included American Airlines, Ford Motor Company, Gillette, JC Penney, Knoll, Denver ’76, and the New York Transit Authority who continue to use Unimark-created trademarks and graphic standards.

Due to the significance and history of the Unimark name, a number of copy-cat design companies have adopted the name in order to attract business. However, none of the current firms or their employees are connected in any way to the original Unimark International. Along with the archives of founder Massimo Vignelli, many of the Unimark archives are now housed in the Vignelli Center for Design Studies at Rochester Institute of Technology.

== Bibliography ==
- Conradi, Jan; Vignelli, Massimo; Rau, Kevin (2010). Unimark International : the design of business and the business of design. Baden, Switzerland. ISBN 978-3-03778-184-5. OCLC 428029133.
