= Heller, Inc. =

American manufacturer of furniture and housewares

Heller
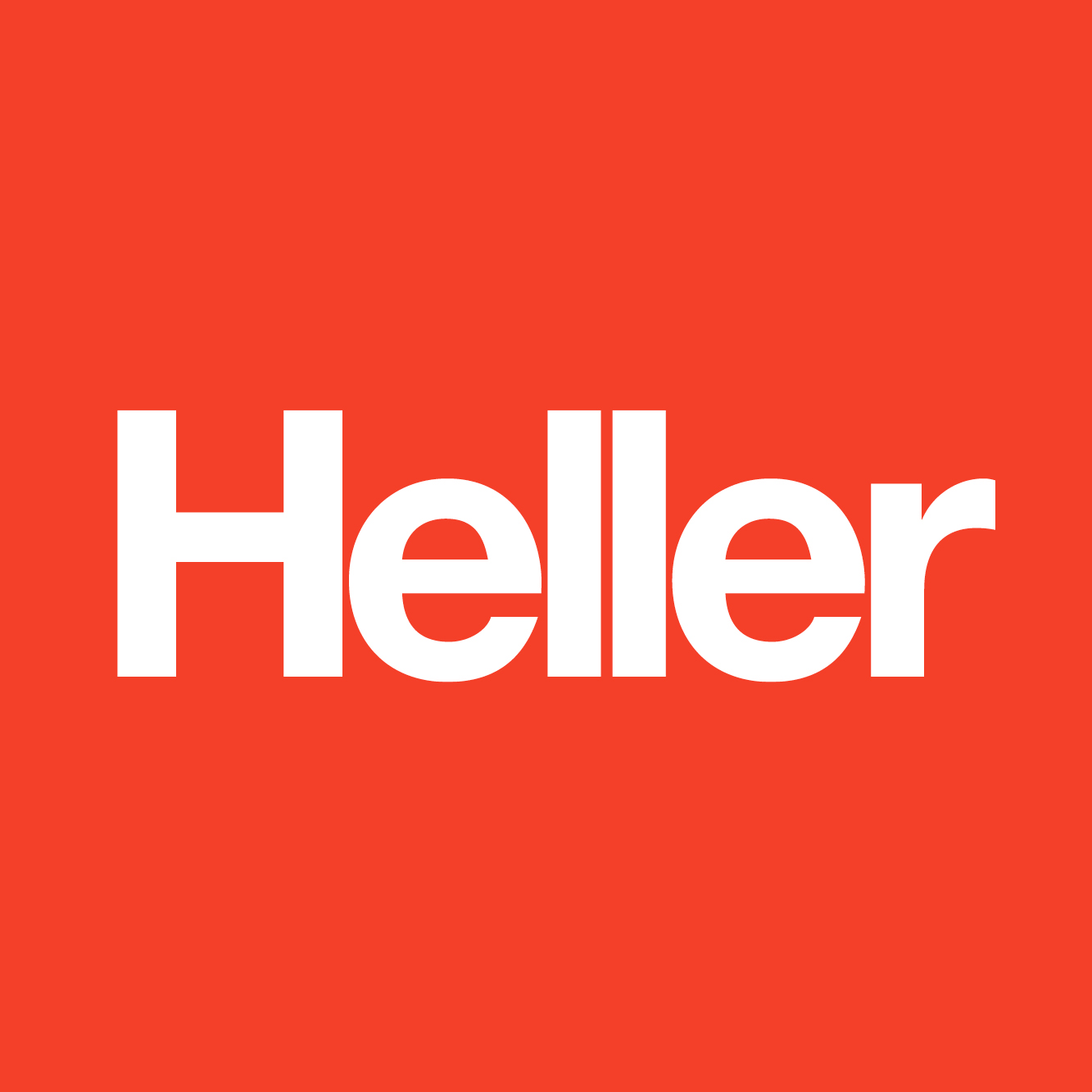
- Company type: Private
- Industry: Furniture, houseware
- Founded: 1971
- Founder: Alan Heller
- Headquarters: Westport, United States
- Website: hellerinc.com

Heller is an American company founded in 1971 that makes and sells indoor/outdoor furniture and accessories. It is headquartered in Westport, Connecticut, United States. Its founder, Alan Heller, invited well-known architects and designers including Mario Bellini, Frank Gehry, and Lella and Massimo Vignelli to create products for the company.

Examples of its furniture and housewares are exhibited in museums including the Cooper-Hewitt Museum, the Museum of Modern Art, the Philadelphia Museum of Art, and the Vitra Design Museum. Its stackable Hellerware won the Italian design award, the Compasso d'Oro.

== History ==
The company was founded in 1971 by Alan Heller. Heller's first line of products was a set of stackable dinnerware known as "Hellerware" designed by Lella and Massimo Vignelli. This design was originally manufactured in Italy and was awarded the 1964 Compasso d'Oro. Heller brought the design to America after the Italian manufacturer ceased production, and revived the product line in America. The brightly-colored Hellerware was seen as a "design classic and signified the 1970s and 1980s" alongside fashionable Marimekko fabrics. A "large selection" of Hellerware is held in the Plastics Collection at Syracuse University Library, with other examples at the Museum of Modern Art and New York's Cooper-Hewitt Museum.

The "sexualised mood" of the 1960s was reflected in items such as Studio 65's Bocca sofa (Italian for "mouth"). Resembling a large pair of red lips, it was originally named "Marilyn" after Marilyn Monroe. The designer was the architect Franco Audrito. Heller has sold it since the 1970s; it was initially made of polyurethane covered with fabric; a modern version is made of waterproof resin polymer. It is displayed in design museum collections including the Vitra Design Museum and the Museum of Modern Art.

Heller died in 2021 and the company was subsequently purchased by John Edelman, who had known Heller well, and John McPhee. Asked what the brand represented, Edelman replied "Accessible. Iconic. Modern." and "I think Heller strikes a chord not only in architects and designers but also regular consumers when the name is mentioned. “Hellerware” was part of many people’s childhoods. There’s a huge push to bring it back."

In January 2023, Heller relaunched their Vignelli Dinnerware collection at MoMA Design Store, leading to its being featured by partner companies. Also in January 2023, Heller began to issue non-fungible tokens to guarantee the genuineness of their designer products such as the Vignelli rocker chair.

== Awards and distinctions ==
The company's furniture and houseware have been described as "elegant, often whimsical but always affordable" by The New York Times, "iconic" by the business news outlet OfficeInsight, as "the cult favorite design brand" by Business of Home magazine, and as "beautiful and timeless" by Architonic. Heller's designers, described by Gray magazine as "some of the world’s most revered", include the Canadian-born architect Frank Gehry, who has designed brightly-colored "cube" seating for the company.

The company's plastic chair designed by Mario Bellini won a Gold Medal, the Compasso d'Oro, in Milan in 2001; it is exhibited in the Museum of Modern Art. The Italian designer and architect Sergio Asti's 1972 ice bucket design for Heller is exhibited in the Philadelphia Museum of Art.
