= Massimo Vignelli =

Italian designer (1931–2014)

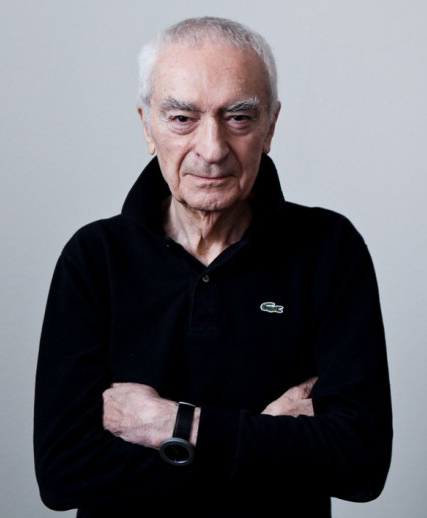
- Born: January 10, 1931; Milan, Italy
- Died: May 27, 2014 (aged 83); New York City, U.S.
- Education: Politecnico di Milano
- Occupations: Graphic designer, industrial designer
- Organization(s): Vignelli Associates, Unimark International
- Spouse: Lella Vignelli

Massimo Vignelli (Italian pronunciation: [ˈmassimo viɲˈɲɛlli]; January 10,1931 – May 27, 2014) was an Italian designer active in graphic design, industrial design, furniture, and architecture. He worked within the modernist tradition, emphasizing simplicity through the use of basic geometric forms. With his wife Lella, Vignelli helped establish the New York office of Unimark International and Vignelli Associates.

Vignelli summarised his thoughts about graphic design as "the organisation of information that is semantically correct, syntactically consistent, and pragmatically understandable," further writing that it should "be visually powerful, intellectually elegant, and above all timeless."

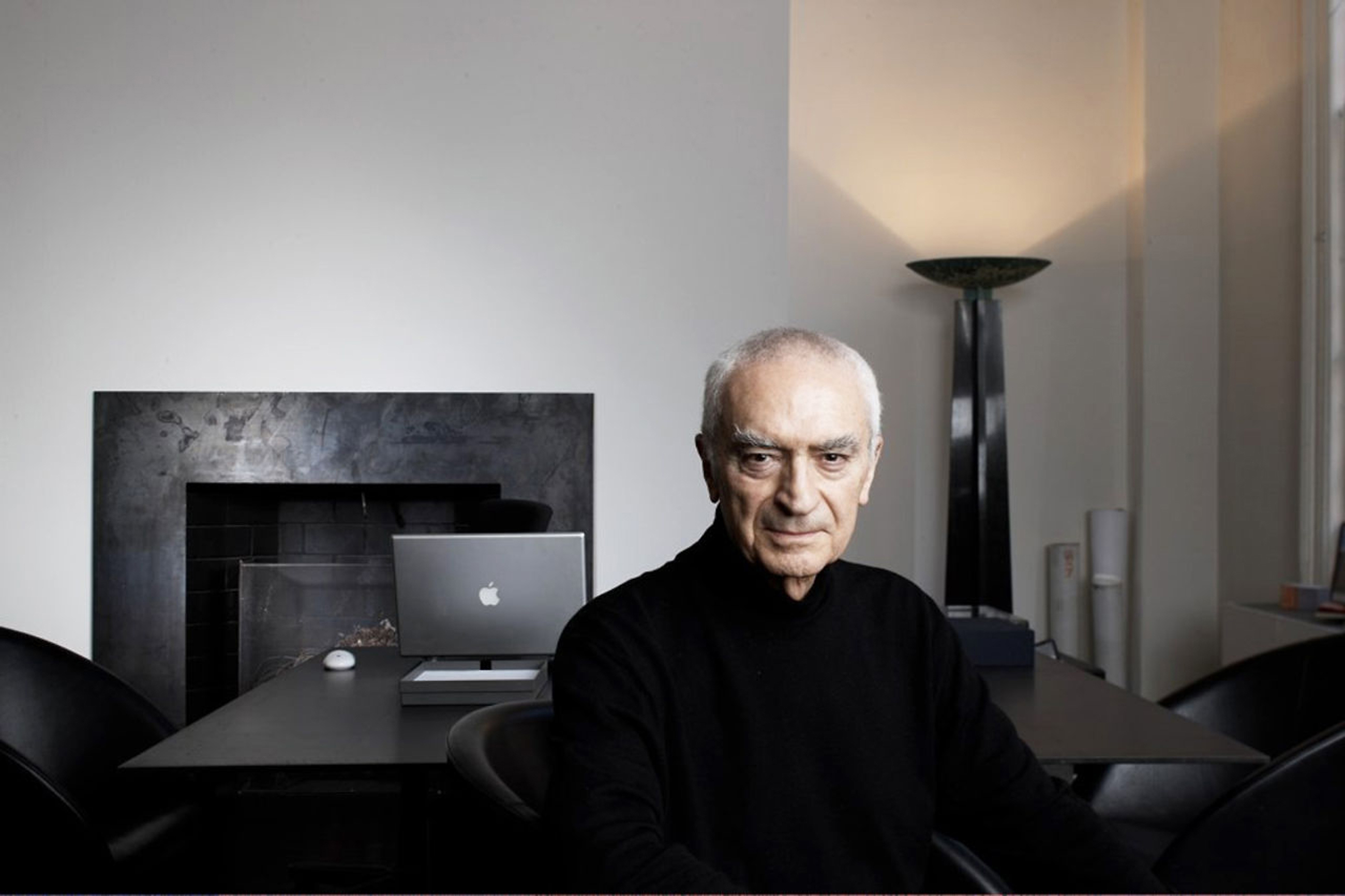
Vignelli pictured in his Manhattan home, 2009

== Biography ==
Massimo Vignelli was born in Milan in 1931. He studied architecture at the Politecnico di Milano and later at the Università Iuav di Venezia. At the age of 16, he joined the Castiglioni brothers' design firm as a draftsman.

Between 1957 and 1960, Vignelli first came to America on a fellowship. He returned to New York in 1966 to co-found the New York branch of Unimark International with six others, including designer Bob Noorda. The firm went on to design corporate identities, including the American Airlines logo (1967), which remained in use until 2013, and editorial projects, including quarterly design magazine Dot Zero published in 1966–1968.

During his tenure at Unimark, Vignelli designed the signage for the New York City Subway. His design for the New York MTA subway map, introduced in 1972, was criticized for sacrificing geographical accuracy for clarity.

Vignelli was brought on board to help create the visual identity for the Washington Metro. Though he was instrumental to the system's aesthetic, the map itself was designed by Lance Wyman and Bill Cannan. Vignelli created the signage and wayfinding system and suggested it be named "Metro" like many other capital city subways instead of its original name, which was a mishmash of various states and transportation groups.

In 1971, Vignelli resigned from Unimark, in part because he felt the design vision which he supported became diluted as the company diversified and increasingly focused on marketing. Soon after, Massimo and his wife, Lella Vignelli, founded Vignelli Associates. By 1977, Unimark had filed for bankruptcy.

Vignelli worked with filmmaker Gary Hustwit on the documentary Helvetica, about the typeface of the same name. Vignelli also updated his 1972 New York City Subway map for an online-only version implemented in 2011 and described it as a 'diagram', not a map, to reflect its abstract design without surface-level features such as streets and parks.

The Vignellis equipped their own home with tables, chairs, lamps, and other items of their design.

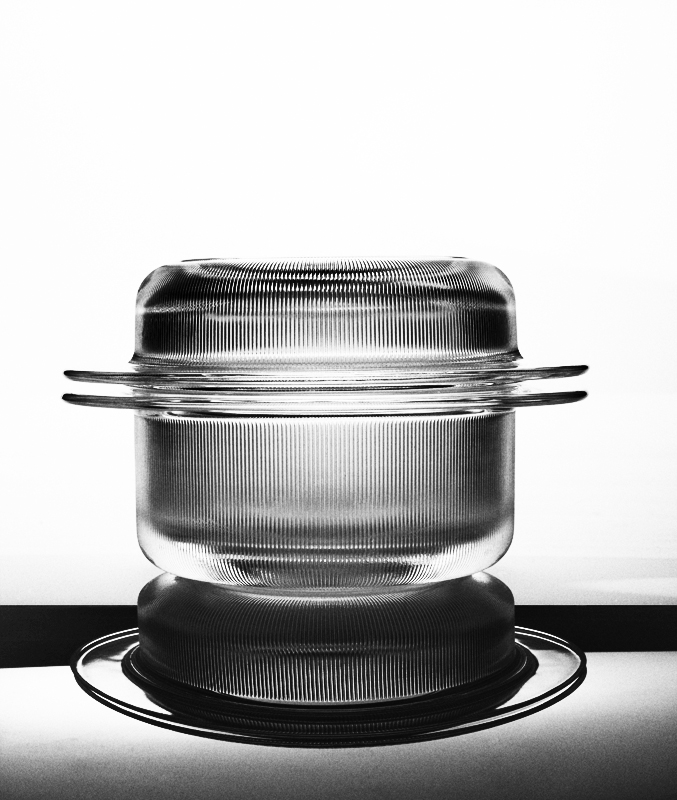
Ovenware designed for Heller

Vignelli died on May 27, 2014, at the age of 83 in New York City.

== Artistry ==
Vignelli worked in a wide variety of areas, including interior design, environmental design, package design, graphic design, furniture design, and product design. His clients at Vignelli Associates included companies such as IBM, Knoll, Bloomingdale's, and American Airlines. His former employee Michael Bierut wrote that "it seemed to me that the whole city of New York was a permanent Vignelli exhibition [around 1981]. To get to the office, I rode in a subway with Vignelli-designed signage, shared the sidewalk with people holding Vignelli-designed Bloomingdale's shopping bags, walked by St. Peter's Church with its Vignelli-designed pipe organ visible through the window. At Vignelli Associates, at 23 years old, I felt I was at the center of the universe."

Vignelli participated in the Stock Exchange of Visions project in 2007, and published Vignelli: From A to Z, a book of essays describing the principles and concepts behind what he called "all good design". It is alphabetically organized by topic, roughly approximating a similar course he taught at the Harvard Graduate School of Design.

Vignelli's designs were famous for following a minimal aesthetic and a narrow range of typefaces that Vignelli considered to be examples of perfection, including Akzidenz-Grotesk, Bodoni, Helvetica, Garamond No. 3, Futura, Times New Roman, and Century Expanded. In his 1991 book, The Vignelli Canon he implored readers to consider that "In the new computer age, the proliferation of typefaces and type manipulations represents a new level of visual pollution threatening our culture. Out of thousands of typefaces, all we need are a few basic ones, and trash the rest."

In January 2009, Vignelli released 'The Vignelli Canon' for free as an e-book. An expanded version was printed in September 2010. In the introduction, Vignelli wrote, "I thought that it might be useful to pass some of my professional knowledge around, with the hope of improving young designer's design skills. Creativity needs the support of knowledge to be able to perform at its best."

Vignelli worked with the National Park Service and the design staff at the Harpers Ferry Center in the creation of the "Unigrid System". The system has been used since 1977 in the creation of park brochures at all national parks locations.

== New York City Subway map ==
Vignelli's 1972 subway map

In August 1972, Vignelli's diagrammatic design for the New York City Subway map appeared on the walls of subway stations and became a significant example of Modernist information design. Vignelli regarded the map as one of his notable works.

=== Origin of the map ===
The origins of the map lie in the problems of the previous decade. In the mid-1960s, the New York City Transit Authority (TA) was facing unprecedented difficulties in delivering information to its riders due to:

- Inconsistent and out-of-date signage that still referred to the old operating companies (IRT, BMT, IND) long after they had been subsumed under a single public authority.
- An influx of 52 million visitors for the 1964 New York World's Fair (April 1964 to October 1965) highlighted shortcomings in wayfinding information for public transportation in New York City.
- Structural changes to the subway network (costing $100 million) reduced bottlenecks, in particular, the Chrystie Street Connection (approved in 1963, expected 1965, opened at the end of 1967), effectively merging two of the three historical networks.

The TA responded by creating the role of Director of Public Information and Community Relations and hired former newspaper reporter Len Ingalls as its Chief of Publicity. In his later years, Vignelli praised Ingalls for being a very good client, which Vignelli often said was the most important factor in the success of a design project. Ingalls began an overhaul of both signage and the subway map. Mildred Constantine, curator of design at the Museum of Modern Art (MoMA) is credited with putting Ingalls in touch with Vignelli, who was then working at Unimark International's New York office. In the Spring of 1966, the TA engaged Unimark to redesign the subway signage and review the ongoing changes to the map. Vignelli teamed up with Robert Noorda, another Unimark co-founder, to create a system of signage that the TA adopted and that endures in every New York subway station today. However, the TA did not follow up on Vignelli's preliminary study of the map as the agency was already at the testing stage of its map design.

=== The 1970s Vignelli map ===
The TA's new map, released in 1967, used Raleigh D'Adamo's principle of color-coding for the first time, but it suffered from what Vignelli called "fragmentation" and was not well received. The following year, the Metropolitan Transportation Authority (MTA) was created to centralize operations of other New York City-area transit systems. William J. Ronan was named as chair and wanted to create a modern brand image for the new entity. By 1970, Unimark's signage project was nearly finished, having created the New York City Transit Authority Graphics Standards Manual. Vignelli approached Ronan with a mock-up showing his concept of a map for lower Manhattan. Ronan approved it, and in July 1970, the TA awarded Unimark a contract to design a new map for the system.

The design was developed by Unimark's Joan Charysyn under Vignelli's design direction. In April 1971, Vignelli left Unimark to set up Vignelli Associates. By this time, the map was almost complete but was subject to corrections and modifications requested by Raleigh D'Adamo, who was now Head of the Office of Inspection and Review at the MTA. The changes were carried out by Charysyn, who also oversaw the printing of the map. The map was unveiled by Ronan on August 4, 1972, at a ceremony in the 57th Street and Sixth Avenue station.

After handing the map design over to MTA in 1972, Unimark and Vignelli had no further control over the project. Six further editions with extensive changes were produced between 1973 and 1978. In 1974, Ronan was replaced by David Yunich as MTA chairman. Yunich was a former executive at Macy's department store, and explicitly intended to "sell" the subway to riders. In 1975, he recruited his former Macy's colleague Fred Wilkinson to form the Subway Map Committee with a mandate to design a map to replace Vignelli's. The next year John Tauranac was made chair of the committee, which concluded in June 1979 with the launch of a more geographically accurate map using a trunk-based color scheme designed by Michael Hertz Associates. The Hertz map replaced the Vignelli map for the next 46 years until the MTA released a variant of the Vignelli map in 2025.

=== The 2000s Vignelli map ===
2008 subway map

At the end of 2007, Mark Rozzo, an editor at Men's Vogue magazine, invited Vignelli to submit a commemorative edition of his map for inclusion in a 'design classics' edition of the magazine. The team at Vignelli Associates welcomed the invitation, as they had been considering how to re-design the map for some time. Massimo Vignelli, Yoshiki Waterhouse, and Beatriz Cifuentes worked together to build a new, up-to-date map from scratch. Besides the general principle of a systematic and minimalist design, they specifically set out to create a map that would preserve spatial relations between stations. For example, if one station is east of another station above ground, those locations must be reflected on the map, alleviating one of the most persistent criticisms of the 1972 map. Their wholly new map was released in the May 2008 edition of Men's Vogue. The magazine sold signed prints of the new map for $300 to benefit charity. All 500 signed prints were sold within hours of hitting the stands on May 1, 2008.

In 2011, the MTA began to look at ways of displaying service disruptions, due to weekend engineering works, in a visual format. They invited Vignelli to develop a digital version of the 2008 map. It was released under the title of "The Weekender" on the MTA website on September 16, 2011. Since then it has undergone several revisions but is still in use today with weekly updates of service changes.

=== Super Bowl map ===
The last map in which Vignelli was involved was a special transit map, designed by Yoshiki Waterhouse at Vignelli Associates, for Super Bowl XLVIII. It was commissioned by the New York/New Jersey Super Bowl Committee for the February 2, 2014, match at MetLife Stadium at the Meadowlands Sports Complex in East Rutherford, New Jersey. It was the first Super Bowl played outdoors in a cold-weather city.

Private cars were not allowed to park at the stadium, so the use of public transportation was considerable. With 400,000 visitors expected to the area and 80,000 attendees expected at the game itself, the MTA worked with New Jersey Transit (NJT), Amtrak, and NY Waterway to produce a special-purpose Regional Transit Map. The map brought in several innovations:

- For the first time, the MTA produced an all-in-one transit map that included both New York and New Jersey lines.
- The map also included the MTA's Metro-North Railroad and Long Island Rail Road, New Jersey Transit lines, and Amtrak lines, all in the consistent visual language of the Vignelli map.
- In addition to an online version, the MTA issued a Vignelli map on paper for the first time since 1979. Paper maps were passed out to spectators and quickly became collectables.
- Also for the first time, a Vignelli map included topographic features (the MetLife Stadium, the Prudential Center, and the Super Bowl Boulevard).

== Recognition and legacy ==
The Triennale di Milano staged a major retrospective of the Vignelli's work in 2026. The exhibition, titled Lella and Massimo Vignelli A Language of Clarity, was curated by Francesca Picchi, Marco Sammicheli, and Studio Mut, and designed by Jasper Morrison and David Saik. In its review of the exhibition, Domus magazine notes that "The Vignellis are not just a chapter in design history. They are an active grammar, often invisible, that continues to organize how we read information, move through spaces, and interact with objects."

=== Vignelli Center for Design Studies ===
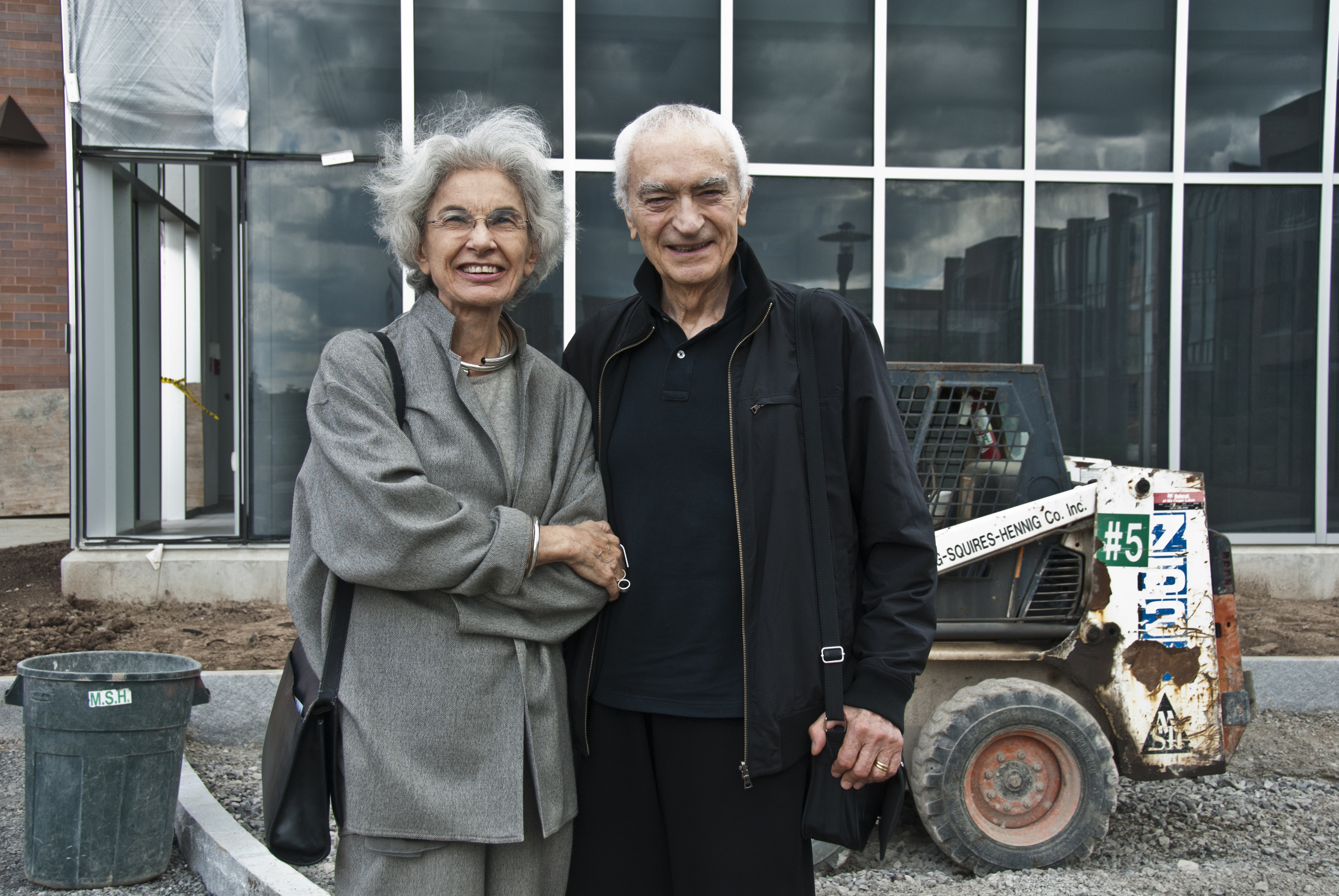
Lella and Massimo in front of the Vignelli Center for Design Studies during construction.

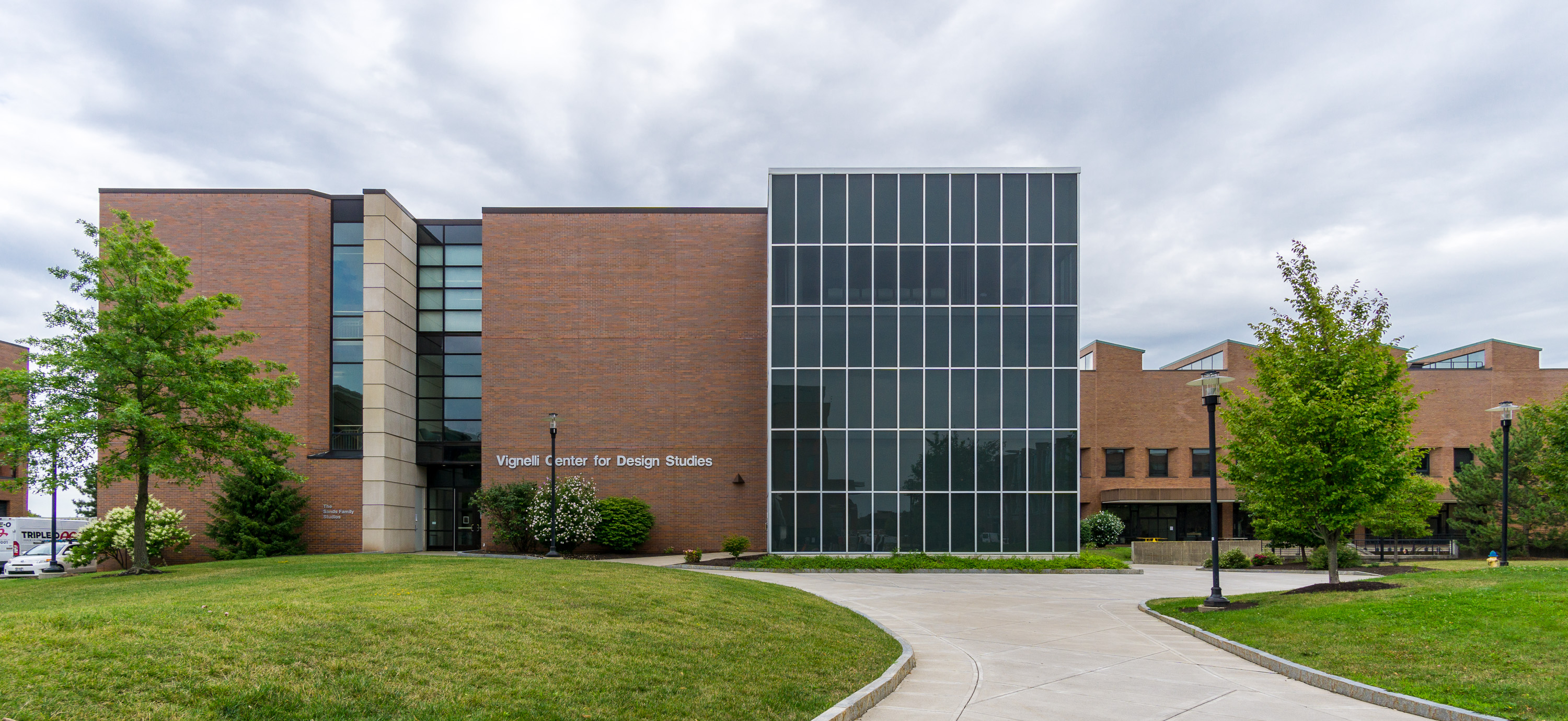
Completed Vignelli Center for Design Studies, Rochester Institute of Technology

In 2008, Massimo and Lella Vignelli agreed to donate the entire archive of their design work to the Rochester Institute of Technology. The archive is housed in a building designed by them, The Vignelli Center For Design Studies. The building, which opened in September 2010, includes exhibition spaces, classrooms, and offices.

=== Awards ===
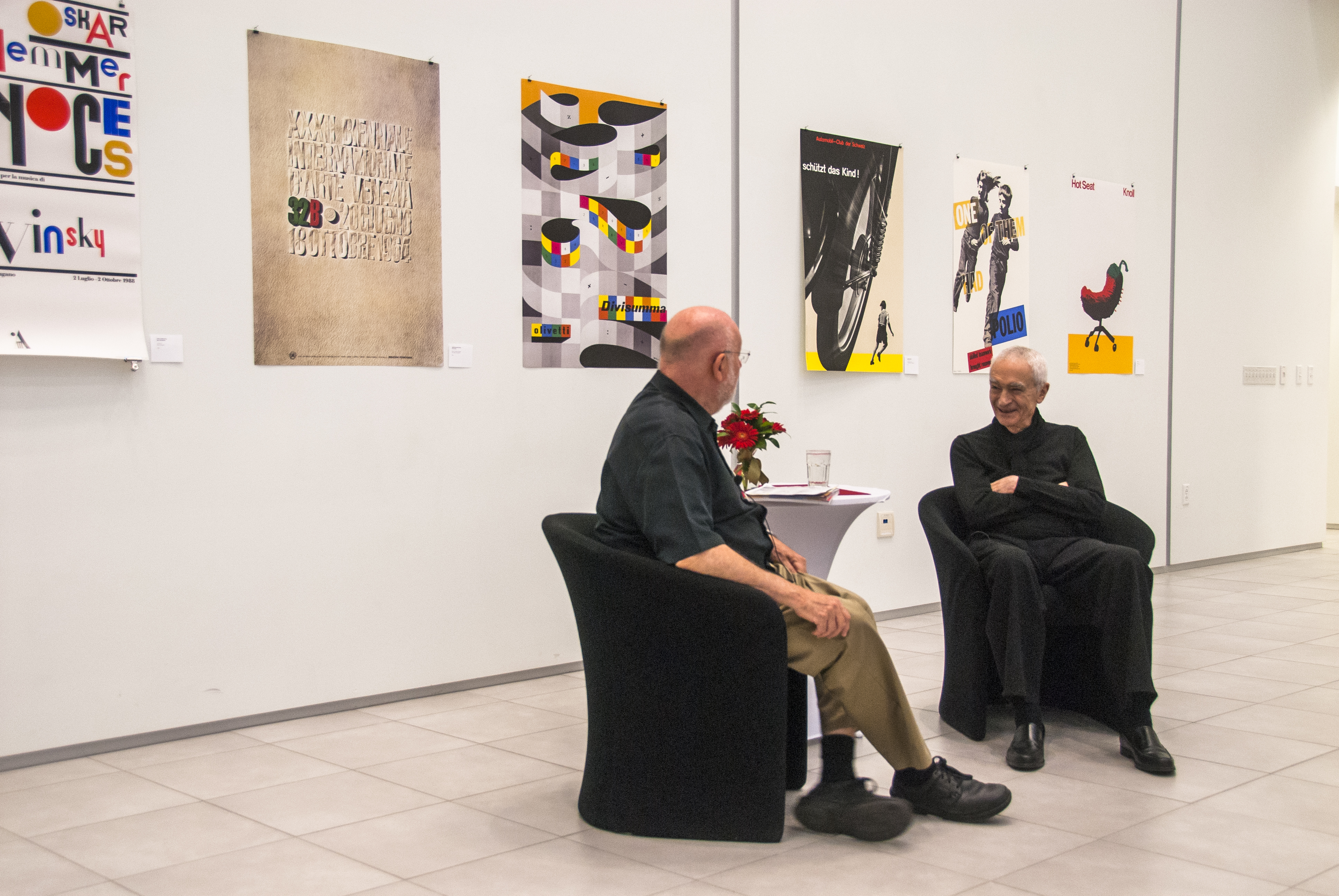
Massimo Vignelli with R. Roger Remington at the Vignelli Center for Design Studies, RIT, where he was awarded an honorary doctorate in fine arts.

Vignelli was given the following awards and honorary doctorates:

- 1964 – Gran Premio Triennale di Milano
- 1964, 1998 – Compasso d’Oro, Association for Industrial Design (ADI), Milan
- 1973 – Industrial Arts Medal of the American Institute of Architects (AIA)
- 1982 – New York Art Directors Club Hall of Fame
- 1982 – Honorary Doctorate in Fine Arts from Parsons School of Design, New York
- 1983 – AIGA Gold Medal
- 1985 – first Presidential Design Award, presented by President Ronald Reagan, for the National Park Service Publications Program
- 1987 – Honorary Doctorate in Fine Arts from Pratt Institute, Brooklyn, New York
- 1988 – Interior Design Hall of Fame.
- 1988 – Honorary Doctorate in Fine Arts from Rhode Island School of Design, Providence, Rhode Island
- 1991 – National Arts Club Gold Medal for Design
- 1992 – Interior Product Designers Fellowship of Excellence
- 1993 – New York State Governor's Award for Excellence
- 1994 – Honorary Doctorate in Architecture from the University of Venice, Italy
- 1994 – Honorary Doctorate in Fine Arts from Corcoran School of Art, Washington, D.C.
- 1995 – Brooklyn Museum Design Award for Lifetime Achievement
- 1996 – Honorary Royal Designer for Industry Award, Royal Society of Arts, London
- 2000 – Honorary Doctorate in Fine Arts from Art Center College of Design, Pasadena, California
- 2002 – Honorary Doctorate in Fine Arts from Rochester Institute of Technology, Rochester, New York
- 2003 – National Lifetime Achievement Award from the National Museum of Design at Cooper-Hewitt, New York
- 2004 – Visionary Award from the Museum of Art and Design, New York
- 2005 – Architecture Award from the American Academy of Arts and Letters, NY

== Publications ==
- Celant, Germano; Constantine, Mildred; McFadden, David Revere; Rykwert, Joseph (1990). design: Vignelli (essays) (1st. ed.). New York: Rizzoli. ISBN 9780847811403. OCLC 20854336.
- Vignelli, Lella; Vignelli, Massimo (2004). Design is One. Mulgrave, Victoria: Images Publishing Group Pty Ltd. ISBN 978-1920744526. OCLC 56575570.
- Vignelli, Massimo (2007). Vignelli from A to Z. (1st. ed.). Mulgrave, Victoria: Images Publishing Group Pty Ltd. ISBN 978-1-86470-176-0. OCLC 148864804.
- Vignelli, Massimo (2010). The Vignelli Canon. Baden: Lars Müller. ISBN 9783037782255. OCLC 630456781.
- Bouabana, Samira; Tillman Sperandio, Angela (2013). Lella Vignelli. Stockholm: Hall of Femmes. ISBN 978-91-978827-4-3. OCLC 839912875.
- Conradi, Jan (2014). Lella and Massimo Vignelli: two lives, one vision. Rochester, New York: RIT Press. ISBN 978-1-939125-07-1. OCLC 879469527.
- Vignelli, Massimo (2014). Designed by: Lella Vignelli
- Hustwit, Gary (2019). Vignelli (1st. ed.). Film First. ISBN 9781734140804. OCLC 1145643926.
