= Bob Noorda =

Dutch graphic designer

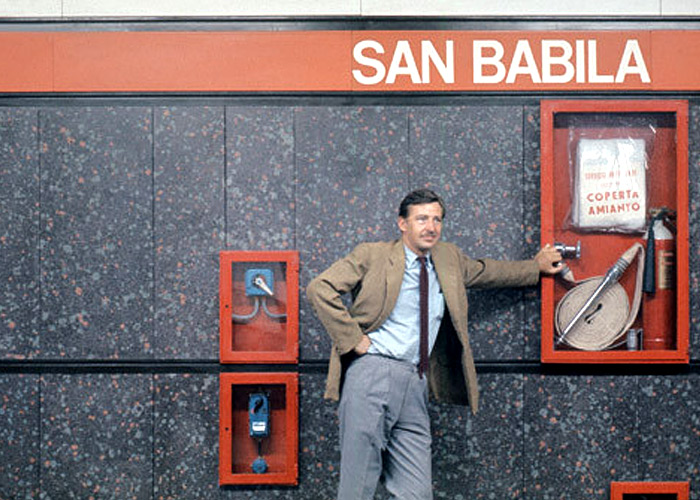
- Born: 15 July 1927; Amsterdam
- Died: 11 January 2010 (aged 82); Milan
- Occupation: Graphic designer

Bob Noorda (15 July 1927 – 11 January 2010) was a Dutch-born Italian graphic designer who lived and worked primarily in Milan from 1954 onwards. His works included design projects for major corporations and large-scale retail chains, publishing houses as well as public works such as the Milan Metro and NYC subway sign and image systems. During his career as a designer, Noorda created more than 170 logos for clients like Feltrinelli, Olivetti, Eni, Zucchi, Touring Club Italiano, Ermenegildo Zegna, and many others.

In addition to design practice, Noorda was a professor in graphic design at the Industrial Design School in Venice, Società Umanitaria in Milan, ISIA Urbino (Higher Institute for Artistic Industries in Urbino) and IED (European Institute of Design) in Milan. From 1996 to 2001, he was a professor of visual communication at Politecnico di Milano.

Mario Piazza notes that for Noorda, "a logo that worked was a simple sign, as easy to read as a child's picture book. It could be abstract or take the form of a monogram or pictogram, but it had to have immediacy, to be readily understood." Noorda said of graphic design, "You can do graphic design anywhere, at a small desk as well as a big one. You don't need a lot of equipment, just a few pencils, and it takes your whole life". The New York Times obituary of Noorda said he "helped introduce a Modernist look to advertising posters, corporate logos and, in the 1960s, the entire New York City subway system."

== Early life and education ==
Noorda was born in Amsterdam in 1927. He attended the Instituut voor Kunstnijverheidsonderwijs (IvKNO), the Institute for Education in the Applied Arts (now the Gerrit Rietveld Academie) and graduated in 1950. The director at that time was the architect and urban planner Mart Stam, who had trained at the Bauhaus. Noorda moved to Milan in 1954. He started to collaborate with Studio Sigla, one of the first advertising agencies based in Milan, as well as with Studio Boggeri, founded by Antonio Boggeri. Noorda then entered Pirelli, and in 1961 became an art director there.

== Career ==
=== 1950-60s ===
In Italy, Noorda gained fame for his design in the late 1950s and early 1960s for posters and advertisements for Pirelli. In 1964 he won, together with Franco Albini and Franca Helg, the Compasso d'Oro, the most prestigious Italian award for design, for the Milan Metro station design.

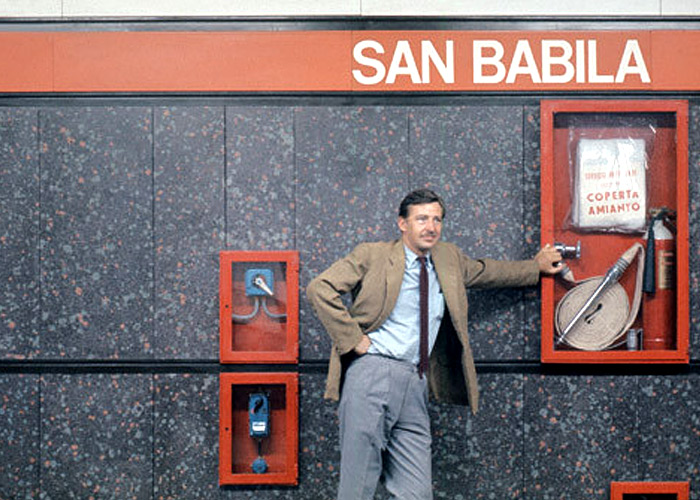
The Milan Metro project, 1962.

As Giovanni Baule writes, "the Pirelli corporate identity was composed of essential visual elements that multiplied like components of a movable alphabet and were used on diverse artefacts, creating a communication "style".

Other notable works during this period include the catalogue for the Le Corbusier exhibition, Knoll catalogue, logo, graphic design and cover layouts for the Vallecchi publishing house, Dreher beer corporate image, coordinated image for the Feltrinelli publishing house and the Mondadori publishing group logo.

In 1965, Noorda and fellow Milan-based designer Massimo Vignelli were among the seven founders of Unimark International, an American design firm with offices around the world, including Chicago and Milan.

=== 1970s ===
In 1970, Bob Noorda and Massimo Vignelli developed the signage system for the NYC Transit Authority.

Other famous projects created during this period include the logo for Ermenegildo Zegna, a redefined coordinated image for Aqip, Eni Group, corporate identity for Truman beers, Total, logos for Zeta Zucchi and Banca Commerciale Italiana, among others.

In 1979, Bob Noorda, together with Roberto Sambonet and Pino Tovaglia, received Compasso d'Oro for their logo and coordinated image for the Lombardy region.

Logo and coordinated image for the Lombardy Region, 1975.

=== 1980-2000s ===
While working for the Touring Club Italiano, Noorda renewed the logo, designed a coordinated image for different publications, including a system of pictograms.

He received another Compasso d'Oro in 1984 for the coordinated graphic image for Fusital, a company that manufactures door handles. Noorda also designed the 18th and 19th Milan Triennale (catalogue covers, signage, graphics).

== Publications ==
- Cinzia Ferrara and Francesco E. Guida (eds.). "On the road. Bob Noorda: travelling with a graphic designer". Milan, Ed. Aiap, 2011. ISBN 978-88-902584-9-7
- Piazza, Mario, ed. Bob Noorda Design. Milan: Moleskine, 2015. ISBN 978-8867327645
