= Mel Thompson =

Mel Thompson may refer to:

- Mel Thompson (writer), English writer and philosopher
- Mel Thompson (basketball), American college basketball player and coach

== See also ==
- Mel Thomson, microbiologist and science communicator
- Meldrim Thomson Jr., governor of New Hampshire
