= Nigel Rodgers =

British writer (born 1953)

- Born: 1952 (age 73–74); England
- Education: University of Cambridge
- Scientific career
- Fields: Art, Philosophy, Architecture, History
- Workplaces: The London Library, Authors' Club, Society of Authors
- Website: www.nigelrodgers.co.uk

Nigel Rodgers (born 1952) is a British writer, environmentalist and critic.

Rodgers has a degree in history and history of art from Cambridge University. He is the founder of Pipedown, the Campaign for Freedom from Piped Music, and is a member of the Educational Writers' Group of the Society of Authors.

== Work ==
He has written 15 books including Incredible Optical Illusions (Simon & Schuster 1998); The Traveller's Atlas with John Man and Chris Schüler (1999); Hitler and Churchill (Hodder 2001); Philosophers Behaving Badly with Mel Thompson; Roman Architecture (2006); Roman Empire (2008); Understand Existentialism with Mel Thompson (Hodder, 2010); Existentialism Made Easy with Mel Thompson (Hodder, 2011); The Greek World (2010); The Art and Architecture of Ancient Greece (2012); Why Noise Matters with Arline Bronzaft, Francis McManus, John Stewart and Val Weedon (Routledge 2011); The Dandy — Peacock or Enigma? and The Umbrella Unfurled (2013). His latest books are Manet: his Life and Work (2015) The Bruegels (2016) and The Colosseum, a guide book-cum-history about Rome's most famous monument, from its inauguration in AD80 to its recent triumphant restoration, published in May 2018. His books have been translated into fourteen languages.
