= Tauranac =

Tauranac is a surname which may refer to:

- John Tauranac (born 1939), American writer
- Ron Tauranac (1925–2020), British-Australian racing car designer
