= Work & Co =

Technology and design company

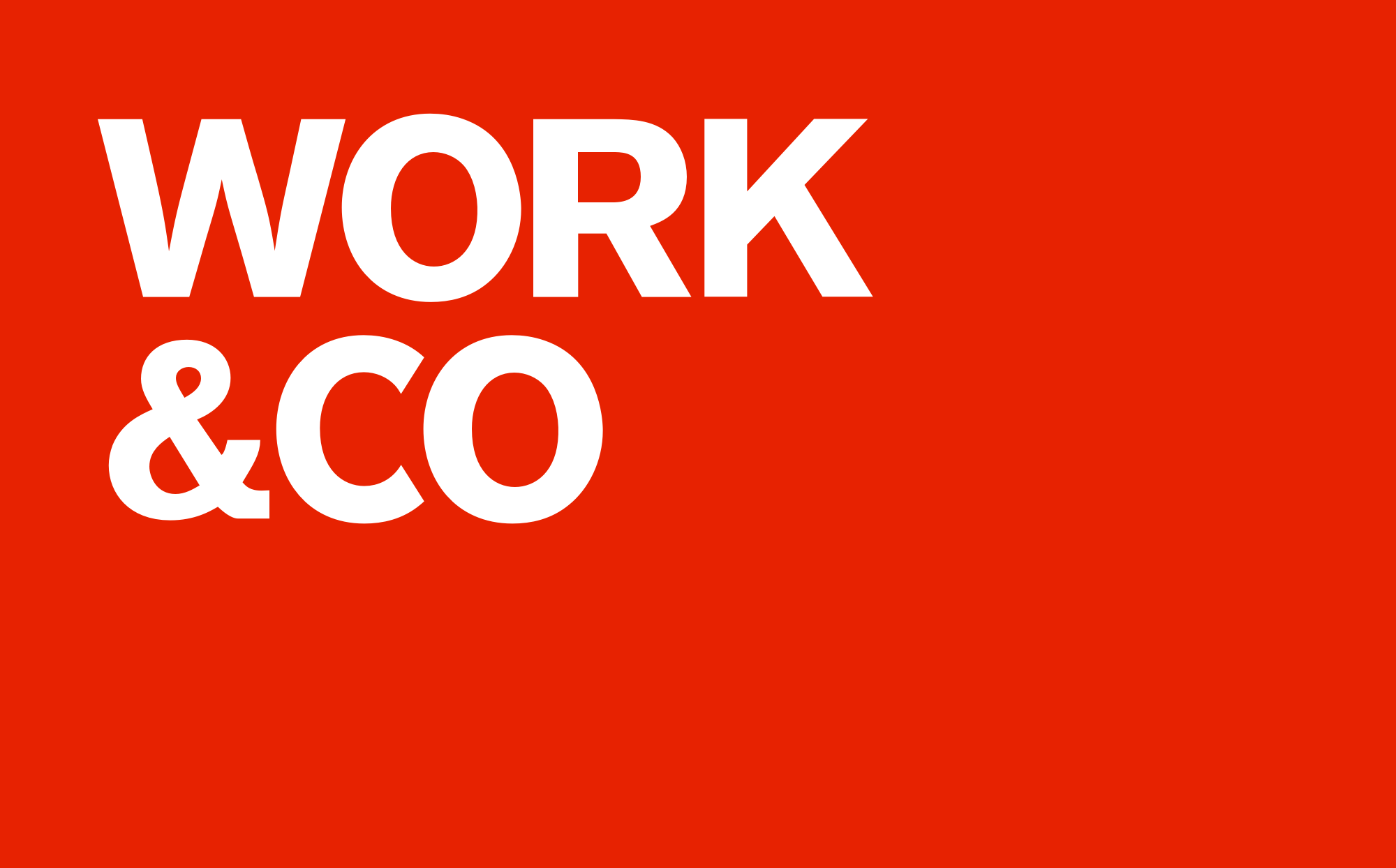
- Founded: May 2013; 13 years ago
- Founder: Gene Liebel; Felipe Memoria; Joe Stewart; Mohan Ramaswamy; Marcelo Eduardo
- Headquarters: Dumbo, Brooklyn, United States
- Number of locations: 8
- Area served: Worldwide
- Services: Digital
- Owner: Accenture (2024–present)
- Number of employees: ~500
- Website: work.co

Work & Co is a technology and design company founded in 2013. Headquartered in Dumbo, Brooklyn, it has offices in Portland, Oregon, São Paulo, Rio de Janeiro, Copenhagen, Belgrade, Los Angeles and Atlanta, Georgia.

The firm designs and develops digital products and services for businesses and non-profit organizations. Notable current and past clients include Acorns, Aesop, ALDO, Apple, Bottega Veneta, Claro, Disney, Grupo Globo, Google, Epic Games, Gatorade, Hippo, IKEA, Mailchimp, Mercedes-Benz, MTA, Nike, Planned Parenthood, T-Mobile and Virgin America.

Work & Co focuses on three core disciplines to create digital products from concept through launch. These include websites, e-commerce platforms, mobile apps, AI tools, chatbots, physical-digital experiences, digital kiosks, and employee tools.

== History ==
Opened in May 2013, Work & Co was founded by Gene Liebel, Felipe Memoria, Joe Stewart, Mohan Ramaswamy and Marcelo Eduardo. Five years later, it opened a new office in Portland, Oregon.

In 2019, the firm expanded its presence in Europe, opening an office in Copenhagen around the same time IKEA named Work & Co as their digital product agency-of-record. After that, it acquired a mobile app development company, Tendigi, and a data and analytics firm, Acknowledge Digital.

In 2022, the company opened additional offices in Los Angeles, California and Atlanta, taking the total number of offices across the globe from six to eight. In April, it acquired digital product consultancy Presence.

After Work & Co laid off 8% of its staff in 2023, Accenture agreed to acquire the company the following year, without the terms of the transaction being disclosed. On January 22, 2024, it was announced that the Irish-American firm had completed the purchase of Work & Co.

== Processes and values ==
Work & Co is known for its collaborative process with clients and being-hands on, sharing working prototypes throughout, rather than unveiling finished work. Projects typically have small, senior teams including company partners and founders who are hands-on active members on each project.

Teams are dedicated to one project at a time—eliminating the need for timesheets traditional to most agencies. Members work cross-functionally across design, product, engineering, and QA, with active involvement of all stakeholders starting at kickoff. The company operates with a single P&L to encourage company-wide collaboration. Often, new employees are hired as suitable candidates are discovered, as opposed to waiting to meet the needs of upcoming projects.

The company has been vocal about its stance in supporting social movements related to DACA and immigration, sanctuary cities, women's health, climate change, and voting rights.

Through the Work & Co Fund, the company has also allocated pro bono work and resources to innovative and cause-based projects. Projects resulting from the 2020 pledge include Ameelio, and The Diversity in Design collaborative.

== Awards and recognition ==
The company has earned several accolades including being twice named to AdAge's A-List and Fast Company's Most Innovative Companies, Digiday's 2018 Agency of the Year, and one of the most Consequential Agencies in Business by Forbes. In 2021, FastCo named the company as a finalist in the Design Company of the Year category. Advertising Age listed Work & Co at number 2 of their 2021 Agency A-List.

Its work for clients has been recognized by several top awards shows including Webby Awards, and Design Week category shortlists and wins, among others.

== Notable work ==
=== Virgin America ===
In 2014, Virgin America partnered with Work & Co to overhaul their website and improve their digital flight-booking process. The agency created the first-ever fully responsive website for a major airline company. After winning a Bronze Lion in Design, Virgin America then named Work & Co their digital agency of record, tasking them with the redesign other products including their mobile app and in-flight entertainment system.

=== Metropolitan Transport Authority (MTA) ===
In October 2020, Work & Co released a major redesign of the MTA's New York City subway map, accessible through digital and mobile devices. The Live Subway Map is an interactive digital product that builds upon the iconic designs by Unimark International and Michael Hertz Associates. It combines the geometric clarity of Massimo Vignelli’s diagram with the geographical and organic curves by Hertz, and connects to a live database for real-time service updates. The project was pro bono.

In March 2021, a feature was added to display COVID-19 vaccination sites across the city.

The Live Subway Map received recognition for its advancements in design and public utility, being named as one of the 100 best inventions of 2021 by Time, as well as People’s Voice Winner and Webby Winner in the Best Mobile UX category from the Webby Awards, and Indigo Awards’ Digital Design of the Year. The product received a Gold Lion for Digital Craft from Cannes Lions, Transportation Award by Core77, and several others.

=== IKEA ===
As IKEA’s digital agency of record, Work & Co has defined and created a number of the company’s digital experiences. Project’s include creating the IKEA's first e-commerce app and overhauling all digital touchpoints in store and online. As part of this work, the company created a strategy to implement a new level of standards for ethical digital data collection and usage. These control features were issued to counter a trend of major retailers collecting and selling user data.

=== Gatorade ===
In 2018, PepsiCo hired Work & Co to help the brand with digital innovation, beginning a long-term, multi-project partnership. Work & Co created the strategy and roadmap digital products—including the Gatorade.com site and Gx and Highlights apps—then systematically developed and launched them.

The Gx app pairs with the Gx Sweat Patch, Gatorades first major step into wearable technology. The app was named 2022 Mobile Design of the Year by the Indigo Awards.

=== Planned Parenthood ===
In 2019, Work & Co partnered with Planned Parenthood for America to determine ways in which technology could extend the non-profit’s reach and impact among teen populations. Work & Co conducted research with teenagers for several months, testing a series of concepts before establishing a plan on “Roo,” a gender-neutral, AI-powered chatbot providing private and doctor-reviewed sexual health information. To emphasize privacy, the tool does not use cookies or collect location information. Work & Co designed and developed the brand, product interface, AI chat engine, back end, and oversaw the product's launch. Within the first year, Roo engaged in more than 3.5 million conversations.

=== Givenchy ===
Fashion brand Givenchy tapped Work & Co to improve their digital capabilities, including a comprehensive rebrand and buildout of their e-commerce products. The new site garnered numerous accolades, including gold medals from Indigo Design Awards, Muse Creative Awards, and Vega Awards.
