= Philosophers Behaving Badly =

2004 book by Nigel Rodgers and Mel Thompson

- Author: Nigel Rodgers, Mel Thompson
- Language: English
- Subject: Philosophy
- Published: 2004
- Publisher: Peter Owen Publishers
- Publication place: England
- Pages: 256
- ISBN: 0720612195

Philosophers Behaving Badly is a 2004 book by Nigel Rodgers and Mel Thompson.

== Overview ==
The book's thesis is that the work and teachings of great philosophers cannot and should not be separated from their personal lives and problems. In this respect, the book's approach is completely new. The authors give as evidence numerous examples from the lives of 8 great philosophers (Jean-Jacques Rousseau, Arthur Schopenhauer, Friedrich Nietzsche, Bertrand Russell, Ludwig Wittgenstein, Martin Heidegger, Jean-Paul Sartre and Michel Foucault) to prove their claims. They emphasize, however, that their findings do not invalidate the thought of the philosophers concerned, but shed new light on an old subject. They show how the work of philosophers relates to their experiences as men. Of all the eight translations, the German title - Philosophers Like Us: Great Thinkers Considered as Human Beings - probably captures most accurately the intention of the authors.

The book was published in the UK by Peter Owen Publishers and was praised as "fascinating and revealing" by Richard Edmonds in The Birmingham Post and by Peter Watson in Times Higher Education as "excellent", although Watson finally found its arguments rather inconclusive.
