= Pipedown (campaign) =

UK environmental campaign

- Founded: 1992
- Purpose: Noise pollution
- Region served: United Kingdom
- Method: Political advocacy
- Website: pipedown.org.uk

The Pipedown Campaign for Freedom from Piped Music, or simply Pipedown, is a UK-based environmental campaign founded in 1992 by the author and environmentalist Nigel Rodgers that opposes the practice of playing background music (piped music) in public establishments. It has links with the sister group in Germany (Lautsprecher aus [loudspeakers out]) and other countries. In Scotland there is a sister group Quiet Scotland, so named because the term "piped music" sounds too similar to "pipe music" to Scottish ears.

The campaign fights background music in public places such as hospitals, libraries, swimming pools, pubs, shops and restaurants. Its literature describes unwanted piped music, also often called elevator music, "Muzak" or canned music, as any music piped without pause through a room or building where people have gone for reasons other than to listen to it. It emphasizes that it does not distinguish between different types of music, saying that all music is debased by being used as a marketing tool or acoustic wallpaper.

Pipedown's literature argues that, while music freely chosen is one of life's greatest pleasures, music forced on people can too easily become the exact opposite. In support of this view, Pipedown makes the following additional points:

- More people have been shown to dislike inescapable piped music than like it.
- Some people find it the "most irritating thing in modern life".
- 86% of people with hearing problems, about 16% of the population, hate piped background music.
- Like other noise pollution, constant piped music can be a health hazard. It can depress the immune system while raising blood pressure and levels of stress hormones such as cortisol, increasing the risks of strokes or heart attacks.
- Research reported in 2013 has highlighted the special problems facing older people who have presbycusis. Presbycusis results in unwanted background noises such as piped music drowning out welcome foreground noise such as conversation.

== History ==
One of the campaign's early successes was achieved by members protesting to Gatwick Airport about the piped music played throughout there. In April 1994 the managers carried out a survey of 68,077 people. Of these 43% said they disliked the piped music, 34% liked it, the rest were indifferent. Gatwick Airport then stopped background music in the main areas. Similar letter/email campaigns have subsequently persuaded supermarket chains such as Sainsbury not to install piped music. More recently, the booksellers Waterstones have agreed to phase it out. Pipedown members can post places – pubs, hotels, restaurants, bookshops – that are free of piped music on the Quiet Corners website. Among recent successes (June 2016) has been helping persuade Marks & Spencer, the "flagship of the British High Street", to drop its music. This was achieved by concerted emails and letters. In Scotland Tesco has agreed to extend its Quiet Hours to the whole of Saturday morning in most of its stores (November 2019). Pipedown has had no success persuading Morrisons or the Co-op chains, however, nor with banks such as HSBC, which have all refused even to consider removing the music piped through almost all their branches despite protests by Pipedown members.

== Attempts at legislation ==
Realizing that there are certain public areas where consumer choice simply does not apply – people have to visit hospitals and health centres, for example – Pipedown has turned to seeking parliamentary legislation to have piped music banned in hospitals.

On 15 March 2000 Robert Key, then MP for Salisbury, introduced a bill into the House of Commons "to prohibit the broadcasting of recorded music in certain public places", principally hospitals. The bill did not pass but raised the issue of piped music in Parliament. On 16 June 2006 Lord Tim Beaumont, the only Green Party peer, introduced a bill to prohibit piped music and television in hospitals. The bill passed in the House of Lords but Beaumont died before he could find an MP to introduce it in the Commons. The campaign has recently renewed its attempts to find an MP or MPs willing to try to introduce a similar bill.

Conversely, Julia Jones, also known as "Dr Rock", has proposed that Parliament vote to allow hospitals to play "chart-topping" music throughout the wards. She claims this would boost patients' mental and physical well-being and also boost the music industry's revenues. Pipedown is mobilising to oppose her claims.

There is another if less acute problem with unwanted piped music in the workplace. People working in music-filled environments also may have no choice about the music playing non-stop through the working day, but they may not like to protest.

== Criticism ==
The campaign has been criticized on several fronts: that it is negative in spirit, even anti-music, also that it is elitist, being supported only by a minority of mostly older people who are out of touch with the commercial reality that customers demand music in most premises.

Critics point to the result of experiments such as that by Professor Adrian North on the effects of different sorts of piped music on shoppers which indicate that piped music affects shoppers’ habits in predictable ways. Other more recent studies are cited in support of his claims.

Pipedown counters these claims by pointing to chains, such as Wetherspoons pubs, John Lewis & Partners, Waitrose, Primark, Aldi and Lidl, which all thrive free of piped music. An online debate about piped music in shops started by Which? Magazine in July 2014 attracted record numbers of comments, most hating piped music in shops.

== Patrons and prominent supporters ==
Pipedown's aims have been publicly supported by a number of prominent individuals, some involved in music. They include Alfred Brendel, Stephen Fry, Julian Lloyd Webber, Joanna Lumley, Philip Pullman (musician), Simon Rattle, Mark Rylance (musician), Prunella Scales, Jake Wallis Simons, Claire Tomalin.Colin Hall Dexter (periodontist)
