= Nobuyuki Siraisi =

Japanese-American artist and designer (1934–2016)

Nobuyuki "Nobu" Siraisi (1934 – March 10, 2016) was an artist and designer. He was a major contributor on the team at Michael Hertz Associates that produced the 1978 redesign of the New York City Subway map.

Siraisi was born in Japan as the youngest of three siblings. He had graduated from Tokyo University of the Arts prior to coming to United States.

Siraisi moved to New York City in 1959 to work as studio assistant to Isamu Noguchi. CBS featured Siraisi in television where his sculptures and paintings were covered in the early 1960s. He then worked as a graphic designer at Gilbert and Associates Advertising and at Michael Hertz Associates, where he had helped produce the redesigned New York City Subway map.

Siraisi met and married Nancy Gillian in 1961, and they had two sons, Maro and Genji. He died at home due to illness on March 10, 2016, and his funeral was held in Brooklyn.
