= John Tauranac =

American writer (born 1939)

John Tauranac (born 1939) writes on New York City history and architecture, teaches the subject and gives tours of the city, and designs city maps and transit maps.

== Work ==
His first published maps (1972 and 1973) were New York Magazine's "Undercover Maps", which showed how to navigate passageways through and under buildings in Midtown and Lower Manhattan in order to stay dry in rain and warm in cold weather.

Tauranac wrote guidebooks for the Culture Bus Loops operated by New York's Metropolitan Transportation Authority as a freelance project for the Municipal Art Society (1973, 1974), whereupon he was hired by the MTA to write and edit "Seeing New York: The Official MTA Travel Guide," which included a depiction of the New York City Subway in a geographic light (1976). He went on to chair the MTA Subway Map Committee that designed the 1979 subway map, which, in addition to depicting the subway in a geographic perspective, simplified the system with the introduction of a color-coding system based on trunk lines. For his dual roles, he was awarded a commendation for design excellence by the National Endowment for the Arts and the U.S. Department of Transportation. He has since designed dozens of maps, many under the Tauranac imprint, including Manhattan Block By Block: A Street Atlas.

Tauranac's books include The Empire State Building: The Making of a Landmark, Elegant New York, Essential New York, and The View From the 86th Floor. His articles have appeared in The New York Times, The New York Observer, The Wall Street Journal, Travel + Leisure, New York Magazine, Seaport Magazine, The Encyclopedia of New York City, and other publications.

Tauranac teaches New York City history and architecture at NYU's School of Continuing & Professional Studies.

== New York City Subway map ==
For most of the twentieth century, official maps of the New York City Subway were geographic in the sense that they represented the actual coastline and selected topographical features such as parks, zoos, and stadiums. There was often some distortion to fit things in - Manhattan was often broadened, and Brooklyn twisted around toward the northeast, but the maps preserved the broad facts of the geography. From 1958 to 1978, the New York City Transit Authority (NYCTA) conducted a twenty-year experiment with diagrammatic subway maps, which showed the topology of the subway network but dispensed with most of the topographical detail, schematized the coastline, and abstracted the subway lines onto a grid. John Tauranac brought this experiment to an end in 1979.

=== The William Ronan era ===
The Metropolitan Transportation Authority (MTA) was founded in 1968, and its first chairman, Dr William J. Ronan, sought to establish a modern brand image. Unimark International, in its New York office headed by Massimo Vignelli, gave him this through two things:

- The wholesale replacement of the inconsistent and out-of-date subway signage by an elegant and efficient system, designed by Robert Noorda and Massimo Vignelli, which is still in use today.
- A diagrammatic map of the subway system, launched in 1972.

=== The David Yunich era ===
In 1974, Ronan was replaced as chairman by David Yunich, formerly Vice Chairman at Macy's department store. Yunich brought an explicit focus on marketing the subway service, saying at his swearing-in that he would examine "any innovative marketing idea" and "Transit marketing is not too different from offering a new line in men's shirts or automobiles". He created a Marketing Department and appointed as its Director Claire McCarthy, who hired John Tauranac as contributing editor of a compendious volume "Seeing New York: The Official MTA Guide book" in time for the United States Bicentennial which brought an influx of visitors to New York. The guidebook promoted the City of New York as a place to visit and enjoy, and promoted the subway as the means of getting around the city. Yunich also brought from Macy's his former colleague Fred Wilkinson (as Executive Officer for Passenger Services), who in 1975 formed the Subway Map Committee, with the aim of designing a new subway map that would not simply tell riders how to get from one station to another - as the existing Vignelli map did, but would also promote the city and its subway, encouraging people to visit and explore it and to use the subway.

=== The new map style ===
Claire McCarthy and senior manager William Allison required that the subway map in the Guidebook be geographic, so that it could also show the locations of visitor attractions. This requirement coincided with Tauranac's own personal preference for geographic maps. It was, however, impossible to draw all the routes in Manhattan as separate colored lines because of the lack of space. Tauranac, therefore, had the map drawn with all subway lines in red. Which services ran on any given lines were indicated by route bullets—circular emblems with lettered or numbered route designations such as 1, 2, 3, A, B, C, etc. When Tauranac was made a member of the Subway Map committee, around December 1975, he brought this geographic style of map with him. About four prototype maps were constructed during 1975 and tested on different demographic groups by Dr Arline Bronzaft and Michael Hertz.

=== The Subway Map Committee ===
At the end of 1976, Wilkinson was assigned from Transit to be Executive Officer of Surface operations and stepped down from the Subway Map Committee. For half a year, the committee did not meet; and then in the summer of 1977, Tauranac was assigned chair of the committee and meetings resumed. Further map experiments were made, and in February 1978 Tauranac organised an exhibition entitled "The Good, The Bad ... The Better? A New York City Subway Map Retrospective" at the Cityana Gallery run by Benjamin Blom, exhibiting the committee's latest prototype map and offering a questionnaire for testing public reaction. Visitors said they liked the geographic information but disliked the use of a single color for all subway lines. In response, Tauranac then prepared a version with two colors, blue for the former IRT lines and red for the former BMT and IND lines. This was exhibited at the Cooper Union in April, when Tauranac debated with Massimo Vignelli in a public battle between the two schools of map-making.

In September 1978, Tauranac met with Phyllis Cerf Wagner, head of the MTA Aesthetics Committee, and told her that the map project was "dead in the water" because he could not make the map he wanted — which was a trunk-colored scheme in which lines that diverge and converge retain the color of each trunk — because there was no funding to change to signage to match the change in the map. Cerf Wagner was able to secure the funds, and in June 1978 the finished subway map was published — a geographic map with trunk-based colors — in time for the Diamond Jubilee, the subway's 75-year anniversary.

Tauranac led a committee of twelve people — comprising TA staff and members of the public — plus the three staff at Michael Hertz Associates. Everybody contributed to the final design, and the map cannot be said to be designed by one individual. The extant minutes of the Subway Map Committee show that Tauranac was responsible for several major design decisions - such as the use of a geographic style, the use of trunk-based color coding, the use of route markers, and the appearance of transfer stations. He also organised and coordinated the contributions of everybody in the group and liaised with TA and MTA staff to get approvals and funding and then to ensure that all the station and car signs in the subway network were changed to match the color scheme of the new map when it was launched in June 1979. He also defended the map in public debate with Massimo Vignelli in April 1978 and December 2010.

== Honors and awards ==
To celebrate the 100th anniversary of the consolidation of New York City, Tauranac was named a Centennial Historian of the City of New York by the Mayor's Office for his work in history.

He serves on the advisory board of the Art Deco Society of New York and on the board of the Cornwall Connecticut Historical Society in Connecticut.

Tauranac received his undergraduate degree from Columbia University's School of General Studies, where he majored in English literature, and his graduate degree from New York University's Graduate School of Arts and Science, where his area of study was American urban history.

== Personal life ==
He lives on Manhattan’s Upper West Side with his wife and daughter.

== Selected books ==
- Essential New York: A Guide to the History and Architecture of Manhattan’s Important Buildings, Parks, and Bridges, with over 170 photographs by Dave Sagarin, 1979, Holt Rinehart & Winston;
- Elegant New York: The Builders and The Buildings, 1885–1915, 1985, Abbeville Press;
- The Empire State Building: The Making of a Landmark, 1995, Scribner; 1997, St. Martin’s Press;
- The View From the 86th Floor: The Empire State Building and New York City, various editions, 1997–;
- New York From the Air: An Architectural Heritage, 1998, Harry N. Abrams; revised, 2002.

== Selected maps ==
- New York City Subway map Prototype, MTA, 1978;
- New York City Subway map, MTA, 1979;
- Manhattan Subway and Bus map-Wallet Size, Tauranac Maps, 1989, revised;
- Manhattan Block By Block: A Street Atlas, Tauranac Maps, 2000, revised;
- Manhattan Line By Line: A Subway & Bus Atlas, Tauranac Maps, 2004.
