= Mel Thomson =

British microbiologist

Dr. Mel Thomson
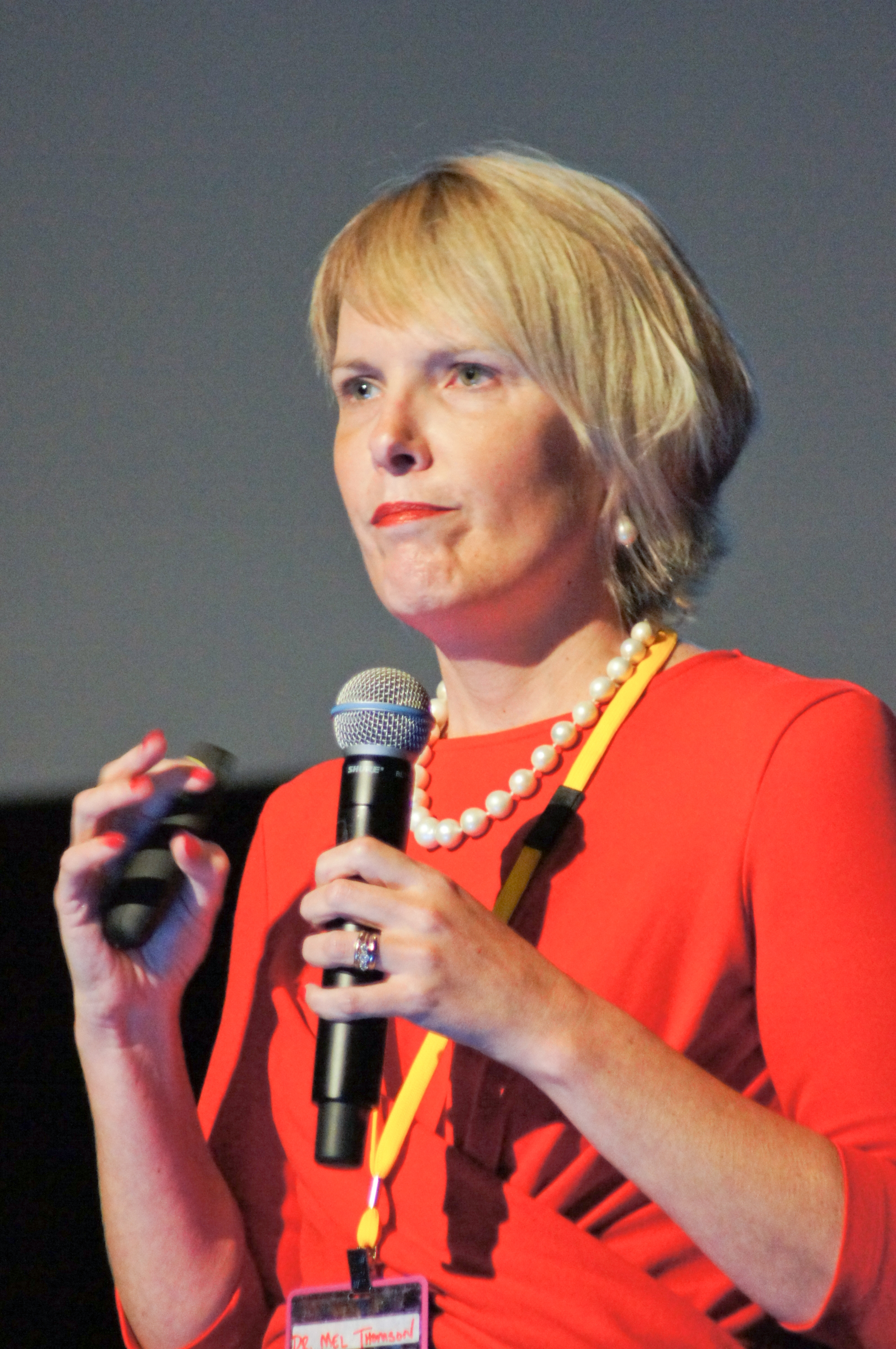
- Thomson in 2015
- Education: University of Melbourne; University of York
- Scientific career
- Workplaces: Deakin University

Dr. Melanie Thomson is a microbiologist and science communicator based in Victoria (Australia). She is the General Manager of Education, Skills and Events at the Medical Technologies and Pharmaceuticals Growth Centre.

== Early life and education ==
Thomson went to Macclesfield Primary School and Caulfield Grammar School. She earned an Honours degree in Microbiology at the University of Melbourne in 1998. She worked as a research assistant at Great Ormond Street Hospital, developing treatments for life-threatening peanut allergies. She completed a Biotechnology and Biological Sciences Research Council funded PhD at the University of York in 2009, working on the neisseria species.

== Career ==
She worked at the Leeds Institute of Molecular Medicine between 2009 and 2011, working with Jean Crabtree. She set up her own lab in the Deakin University and Geelong Centre for Emerging Infectious Diseases in 2011. Thomson began to crowdfund for academic research, leading two successful campaigns Mighty Maggots and Hips for Hipsters. She took part in "I'm A Scientist, Get Me Out of Here!" in 2013. She joined the Medical Technologies and Pharmaceuticals Growth Centre (MTPConnect) in 2016 as General Manager for education. MTPConnect is a med-tech and pharma growth centre.

== Activism ==
In 2014 she was diagnosed with multiple sclerosis and has since become an advocate for patients. She won the Leadership Award at the 2017 Geelong Awards for People with a Disability.

She is a founding steering member of Women in Science Australia.

She was a finalist for the Telstra Victorian Public Sector and Academia Award in 2017.

She accused prominent astrophysicist and skeptic Lawrence Krauss of grabbing a woman's breast during a skeptic's conference event at the Melbourne Zoo in Australia, and filed a sexual harassment complaint against his employer Arizona State University that was ultimately upheld. In combination with multiple other harassment allegations, this resulted in his removal from the directorship of the Origins Institute and retirement from the university.

In September 2018 she sparked controversy by referring to Qantas staff as "trolly dollys" in a tweet, after they referred to her as "Miss" rather than "Doctor".
