= Mel Thompson (writer) =

- Born: 1946 (age 79–80); England
- Scientific career
- Fields: Ethics; philosophy; religion
- Website: essexthinker.com

Mel Thompson (born 1946) is an English writer and philosopher. He was formerly a teacher, editor and A level examiner.

== Life and education ==
Born in 1946, he was educated at King Edward VI School, Chelmsford and King's College London where he received a BD in 1969 (Shelford Prize for Philosophy of Religion; Tinniswood Essay Prize), MPhil (as an external student) in 1973, and a PhD in 1979. He worked for some years as an ordained minister within the Church of England before resigning to work within Religious Education and as a freelance writer. From 1990 to 1998 he was editor of the Religious Education list at Hodder Education.

He is a member of the Society of Authors, London, and was formerly a member and Chair of the Educational Writers Group. He is interested in exploring ways in which new technology can enhance opportunities for writers, particularly with reference to self-publication.

Concerned that copyright should be respected and authors paid when their work is used, Mel Thompson was, from 2003 to 2010, a non-executive director of the Authors Licensing and Collecting Society, and was also a non-executive director and Chair of the Copyright Licensing Agency. For his views on copyright see the YouTube video published by the Copyright Licensing Agency in 2012.

He was recently involved with a new A-level textbook for AQA Religious Studies, co-authored with John Frye and Debbie Herring, and has written a sixth edition of his most popular Teach Yourself book on Philosophy – entitled Philosophy for Life and revised to include introductions and chapters exploring the way in which philosophy may help us address personal and existential questions, published in the Teach Yourself series in October 2017. His first self-published book Through Mud and Barbed Wire is an account of the impact of the First World War on the thinking of two great theologians, Paul Tillich and Pierre Teilhard de Chardin – who just happened to be fighting on opposite sides of the same part of the Western Front in 1916 and whose lives were transformed by the experience. In 2019 he self-published three textbooks that were formerly published by Hodder Education, making them available in both print and digital format as cheaply as possible, for the benefit of students and teachers.

His latest book, exploring belief in a secular age and entitled Can Atheism Rescue God?, was published in June 2025.

In 2021 he bought Brimstone Press and set it up as a not-for-profit, self-publishing cooperative.

Mel Thompson has a range of galleries on his website. He has also written a history of the village, entitled Little Baddow: the story of an Essex village.

== Works ==
His many publications include philosophy titles published by Teach Yourself books (Ethics, Philosophy, Political Philosophy, Philosophy of Religion, Eastern Philosophy, Philosophy of Mind and Philosophy of Science) and textbooks for Religious Studies, including Ethical Theory, Religion and Science and An Introduction to Philosophy and Ethics in Hodder Education's Access to Philosophy series. He published The Buddhist Experience in 1993. He has contributed to Nelson Thornes’ Understanding Philosophy for A2 Level, edited a large-format, illustrated handbook of philosophy entitled World Philosophy and has co-authored with Nigel Rodgers a book about some less well-known aspects of philosophers’ lives, entitled Philosophers Behaving Badly published by Peter Owen). Other publications include Me in Acumen's ‘The Art of Living’ series, exploring issues of personal identity, Understand Existentialism, co-authored with Nigel Rodgers, The Philosopher's Beach Book, published by Hodder Education in 2012, giving an easy introduction to 35 philosophical questions, and he has contributed to The Religions Book published by DK.

Recent titles include Philosophy for Life, the sixth edition of his introduction to Philosophy originally published in 1994 as Teach Yourself Philosophy, but now extensively revised, and a core textbook for AQA Religious Studies, co-authoried with John Frye and Debbie Herring. In 2017 he self-published Through Mud and Barbed Wireabout the impact of the First World War on the thinking of two of the 20th century's greatest religious thinkers – Paul Tillich and Teilhard de Chardin. His most recent book, entitled Ethics for Life, was published by John Murray Education in the Teach Yourself series in October 2018. In 2019 he self-published new editions of Introduction to Philosophy and Ethics, Ethical Theory and Religion and Science in his Access for Students series.

His latest books include Home: a philosophy of personal space, published in 2021 by Brimstone Press, a self-publishing co-operative. It asks the question 'Where do you belong?' Details are available at. and. Can Atheism Rescue God?, published in 2025. He has also published a history of the village of his birth - Little Baddow: the story of an Essex village - tracing its history from the ice age to the Edwardians.

English language versions of his books have sold over half a million copies, and have been translated into 15 other languages. For more on his views on writing see the interview given to Nigel Warburton in 2006 for the Virtual Philosopher website.

== Links ==
- Mel Thompson. "Philosophy - quick discussion topics". essexthinker.com.
- Mel Thompson. "Ethics - quick discussion thoughts". essexthinker.com.
- Mel Thompson. "Philosophy of Religion - quick thoughts". essexthinker.com.
- Mel Thompson. "Political Philosophy - quick thoughts". essexthinker.com.
