= Michael Hertz Associates =

American design firm

Michael Hertz Associates (MHA) is a New York City graphic design firm, best known for its 1979 design of the New York City Subway map and the station and subway car signage systems that the map engendered. The 1979 map, with some modifications, remained the MTA's official subway map until April 2025. The firm specializes in maps and environmental graphics for mass transit systems.

== History ==
The firm was founded in 1969 by Michael Hertz (1932–2020). Their body of work also includes many other transit projects in the New York City metropolitan area as well as maps for major transit systems such as Houston, Texas, Washington, D.C., and other smaller transit systems throughout the United States.

The New York City Subway map, which replaced a critically praised but publicly unpopular abstract design by Massimo Vignelli, was extremely popular because it represented one of the first attempts to combine the design sensibility of an abstract map with the comfortable, recognizable geography of a traditional map. While the cartography slightly resembles the real geography of New York City, it has been carefully and extensively manipulated to improve legibility in congested areas. Much of the design work was done by the fine artist and designer Nobu Siraisi, who worked for MHA during the period this map was under development.

In addition to its transit system work, MHA has also produced a wide variety of maps and related designs for clients including the Port Authority of New York and New Jersey, the United States Army Center of Military History, the New York City Law Department, and other clients in the business, non-profit and public sectors.

The company has received many transit design awards, including The National Endowment for the Arts' Commendations for Design Excellence. Their work has appeared in a Smithsonian Institution traveling exhibition and an American Passenger Transport Association manual on excellence in transit system map design.
