= Arline Bronzaft =

American psychologist (1936–2025)

Arline Lillian Bronzaft (née Cohen; March 26, 1936 – October 29, 2025) was an American environmental psychologist, researcher, and advocate. She studied the adverse effects of noise pollution on human health.

She grew up in New York City and attended Hunter College. She was married and had two daughters. She worked as a psychology professor at Lehman College. In 2018, Bronzaft received the Citizen Psychologist Presidential Citation of the American Psychological Association for her life's work.
