= R211 (New York City Subway car) =

Class of New York City Subway car

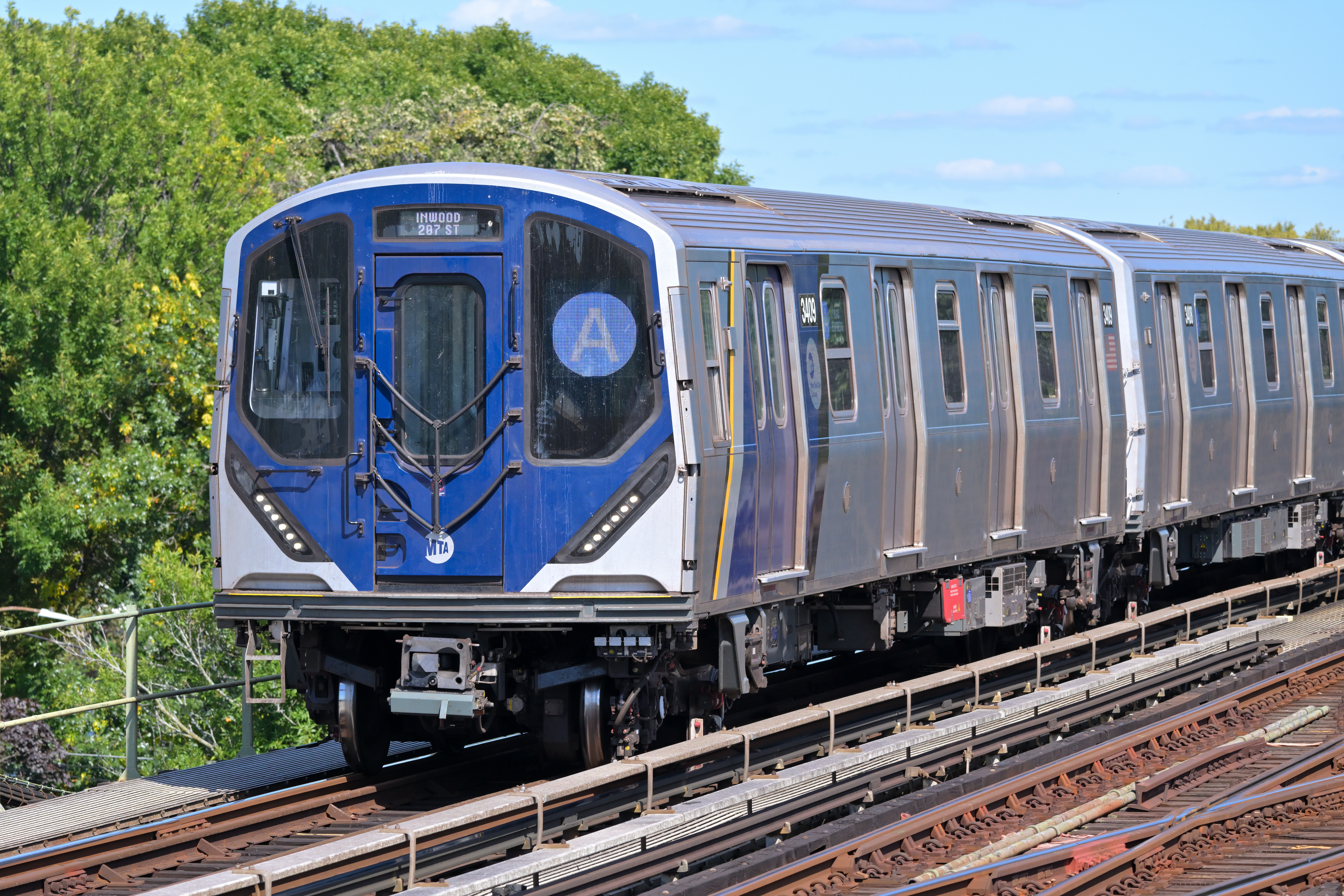
- An A train of R211As approaching 80th Street

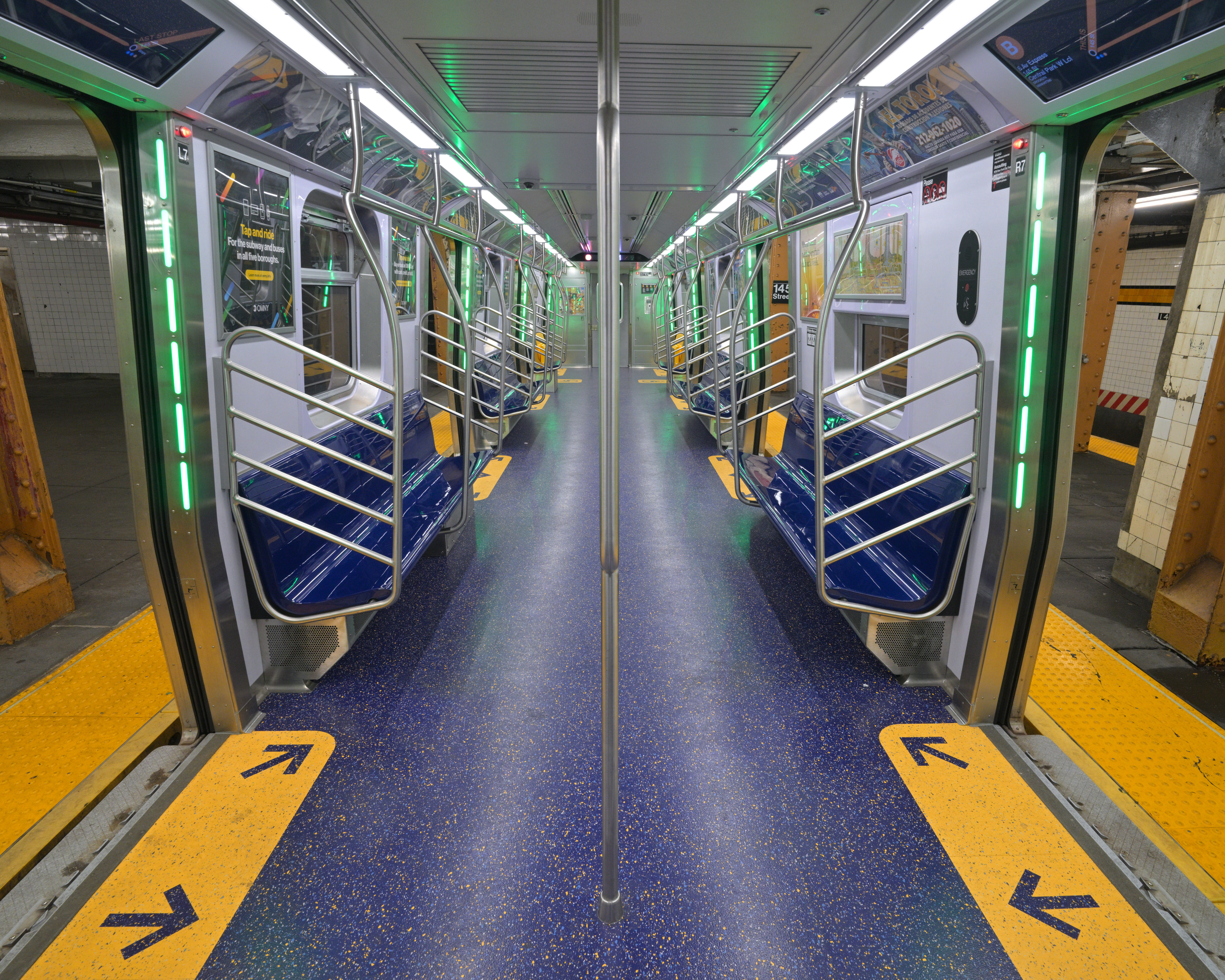
- The interior of an R211A car
- In service: March 10, 2023 – present (3 years)
- Manufacturer: Kawasaki Railcar Manufacturing
- Built at: Yonkers, New York, U.S.; Lincoln, Nebraska, U.S.; Kobe, Hyōgo, Japan
- Family name: NTT (New Technology Train)
- Constructed: 2020–present
- Entered service: R211A: March 10, 2023; R211S: October 8, 2024; R211T: February 1, 2024
- Number under construction: R211A: 455; R211T: 80; Total: 535
- Number built: R211A: 980; R211S: 75; R211T: 20; Total: 1,075
- Number in service: 1,075
- Capacity: 30 seats, 210 standing per car
- Operators: New York City Subway; Staten Island Railway
- Depots: Clifton Yard (75 cars); Concourse Yard (110 cars); Coney Island Yard (370 cars); Pitkin Yard (520 cars)
- Services assigned: R211A: R211S: R211T:

Specifications
- Car body construction: Stainless steel with fiberglass ends and rear bonnets
- Train length: 5-car train: 301.05 feet (91.76 m)
- Car length: 60.21 feet (18.35 m)
- Width: 10 feet (3,048 mm) max
- Height: 12 feet (3,658 mm) max
- Floor height: 3.76 ft (1.15 m)
- Platform height: 3.76 ft (1.15 m)
- Entry: Level
- Doors: 8 sets of 58 inches (150 cm) wide side doors per car
- Maximum speed: 66 mph (110 km/h) (design); 55 mph (89 km/h) (service)
- Weight: 82,000 pounds (37,000 kg)
- Traction system: Alstom OPTONIX IGBT–VVVF
- Traction motors: 2 or 4 (Note: 2 motors on A1 cars (lowest number car in unitized set), 4 motors on A2 & B cars) × Alstom 4 ECA 1625 A 3-phase AC induction motors
- Acceleration: 2.5 mph/s (1.1 m/s^{2})
- Deceleration: 3.0 mph/s (1.3 m/s^{2}) (full service); 3.2 mph/s (1.4 m/s^{2}) (emergency)
- Electric systems: Third rail, 600 V DC
- Current collection: Contact shoe
- Braking systems: Dynamic braking propulsion system; Pneumatic tread brake system
- Safety systems: CBTC, dead man's switch, pulse code cab signaling, train stop
- Headlight type: LED
- Track gauge: 4 ft 8 1/2 in (1,435 mm) standard gauge

The R211 is a class of New Technology Train (NTT) subway cars built for the New York City Transit Authority. Being built by Kawasaki Railcar Manufacturing for the B Division of the New York City Subway and for the Staten Island Railway (SIR), they will replace aging subway car models: all R44 cars on the SIR, plus all R46 and some R68 subway cars. It contain features such as wider doors, information displays, and LED-lit doorways. The order is split into three parts: R211A and R211T cars for the subway and R211S cars for the SIR. The R211Ts employ open gangways between cars, allowing passengers to see and walk between multiple cars – a feature not present on the subway's other rolling stock.

Planning for the R211 order started in 2011, with the design process starting in 2012. The request for proposal was solicited in July 2016, with the Metropolitan Transportation Authority (MTA) awarding a contract to Kawasaki in January 2018. Delivery of the pilot cars began at the end of June 2021. The R211As entered service on March 10, 2023, beginning a 30-day acceptance test on the A. Following a successful revenue service test, it officially entered service with the first production set on June 29, 2023. The open gangway R211T test trains entered service on February 1, 2024, on the C, while the first R211S train entered service on the SIR on October 8, 2024.

== Component orders ==
With all options exercised, the Metropolitan Transportation Authority (MTA) plans to spend at least $3.686 billion in the order. The contract is split into three parts: R211A, R211S, and R211T. The majority of the 535-car base order will comprise 440 R211A cars that will partially replace the aging 748-car R46 fleet. (Note: The R211 order is slated to replace 752 R46 cars. Four of these cars were scrapped after separate incidents in 2017 and 2020, leaving only 748 cars in revenue service.) There are also 20 R211T open gangway prototype cars, first delivered in late 2022, and 75 R211S cars that replaced the now 52 year old remaining 61-car R44 fleet on the Staten Island Railway. The R44s and R46s are 75 feet (23 m) long, and the R211s are only 60 feet (18 m). As a result, the 752 R46s would need to be replaced by 940 R211s. (Note: Both quantities represent 94 full-length trainsets, each of which is 600 ft (180 m) long. Each 600-foot trainset of R46s would require eight cars, while each 600-foot trainset of 60 long cars would require ten such cars. As such, 752 R46 cars could be arranged to make 94 full-length trainsets, and 940 sixty-foot-long cars could be arranged to make 94 such trainsets.) In September 2024, the MTA indicated the possibility of retiring a handful of R68 and R68A cars with R211s, and in December, it was confirmed that some R68s would be replaced by the second option order.

There will be two options for additional cars: the first comprises 640 R211A cars, and the second comprises 355 R211A cars and 80 R211T cars for a total of 1,610 cars including the base order. Any cars from the option orders that do not replace existing rolling stock will be used to expand the system's fleet.

The R211 order was expected to provide 1,015 new cars to replace the existing fleet, as well as up to 597 cars for fleet expansions following the extension of the Second Avenue Subway and the automation of the New York City Subway. The R211Ts would also increase capacity and allow passengers to walk seamlessly from one car to the next.

As of July 2025, the R211As and R211Ts are based out of Pitkin Yard and Coney Island Yard, and the R211Ses are based out of Clifton Yard. For the subway fleet, the R211As are assigned to the A, B, C, D, G, and Rockaway Park Shuttle, and the R211Ts are assigned to the G. (Note: Multiple sources: For the A, C, and Rockaway Park Shuttle assignments: For the B assignment: For the D assignment: For the G assignment:)

== Features ==
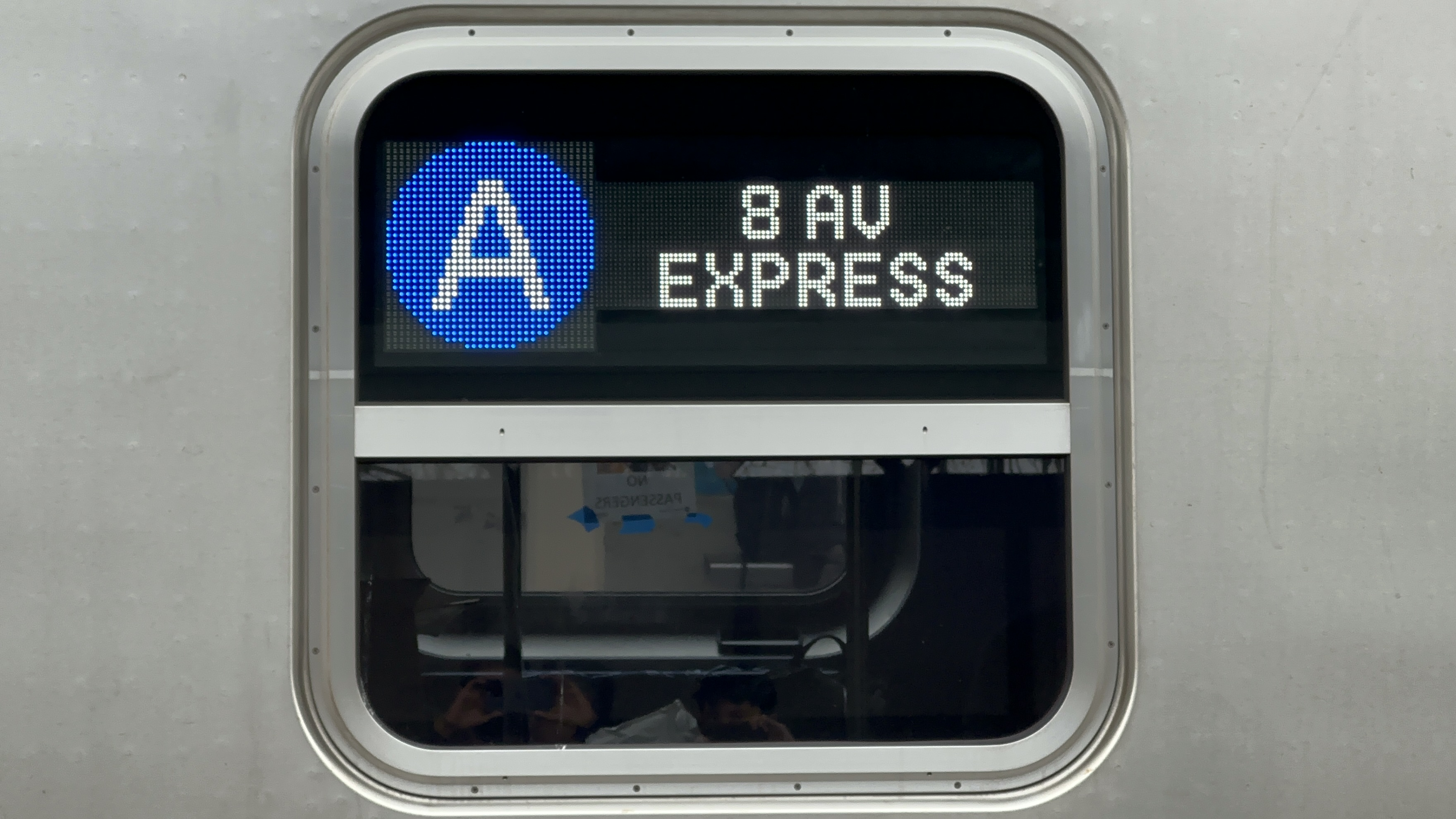
The LED side destination sign of an R211

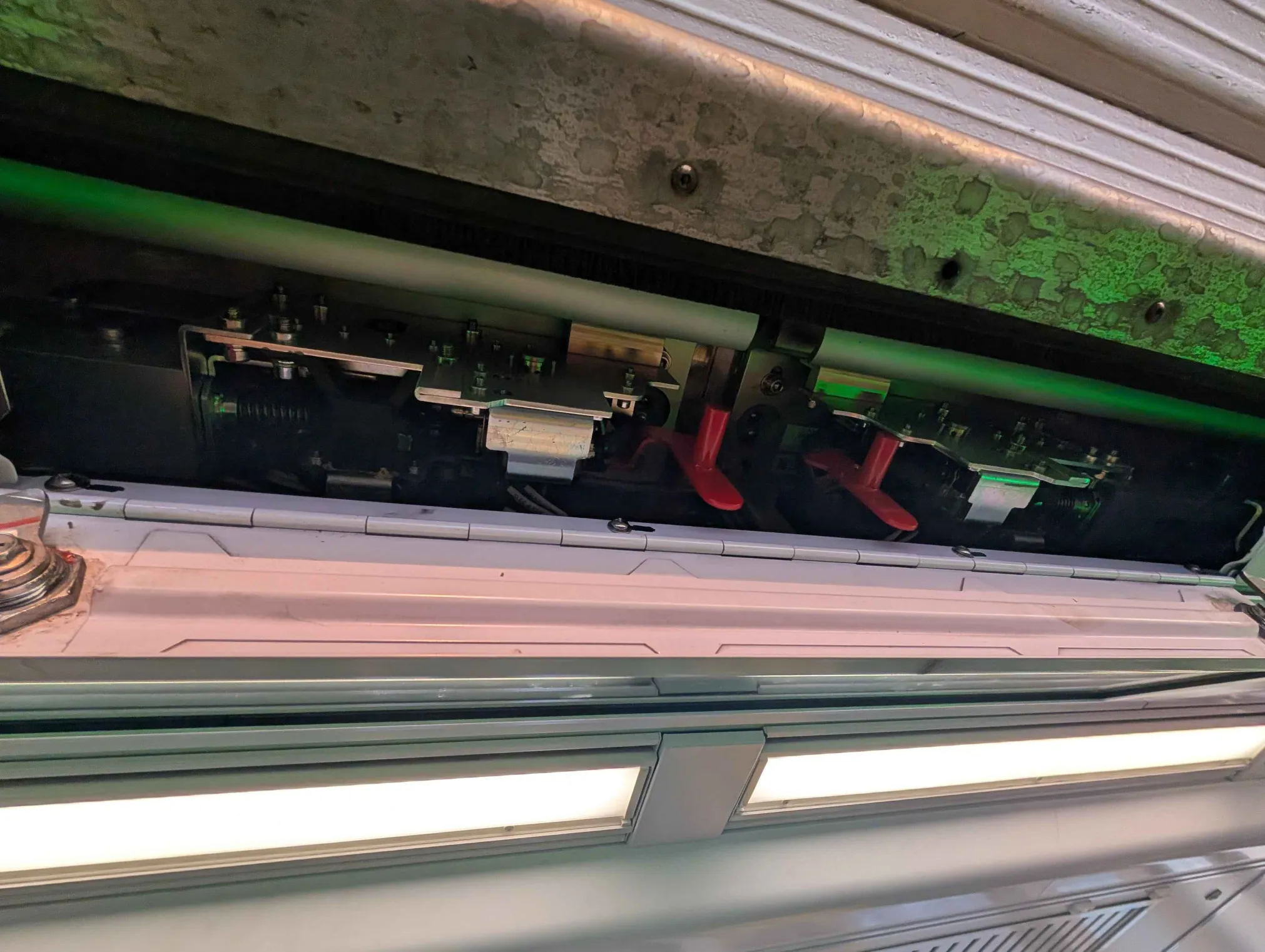
The mechanism found in the R211s doors

On the exterior, the cars have a blue front with large windows, LED headlights, and a blue stripe with gold accents on the sides. To designate the route, a large LED screen with the route bullet is displayed at the ends of the train, while the route's destination is displayed above the door on the front. On the sides, there is a screen that displays both the route bullet and the route's destination.

The doors on the R211s are 58 inches (150 cm) wide, compared to current MTA standard of 50 inches (130 cm), thereby projected to reduce station dwell time by 25 to 30 percent. This door width will also promote accessibility on the cars, making them the first fully accessible subway car in New York City. This design change partially incorporates a design feature of the R110A prototype subway cars, which had doors that are 63 inches (160 cm) wide. Flanking each set of doors are lights, which illuminate to indicate on which side of the train the doors would open. There are twelve lights around each set of doors. These lights turn green when the doors open and flashing red when the doors are closing at each station.

=== Interior features ===
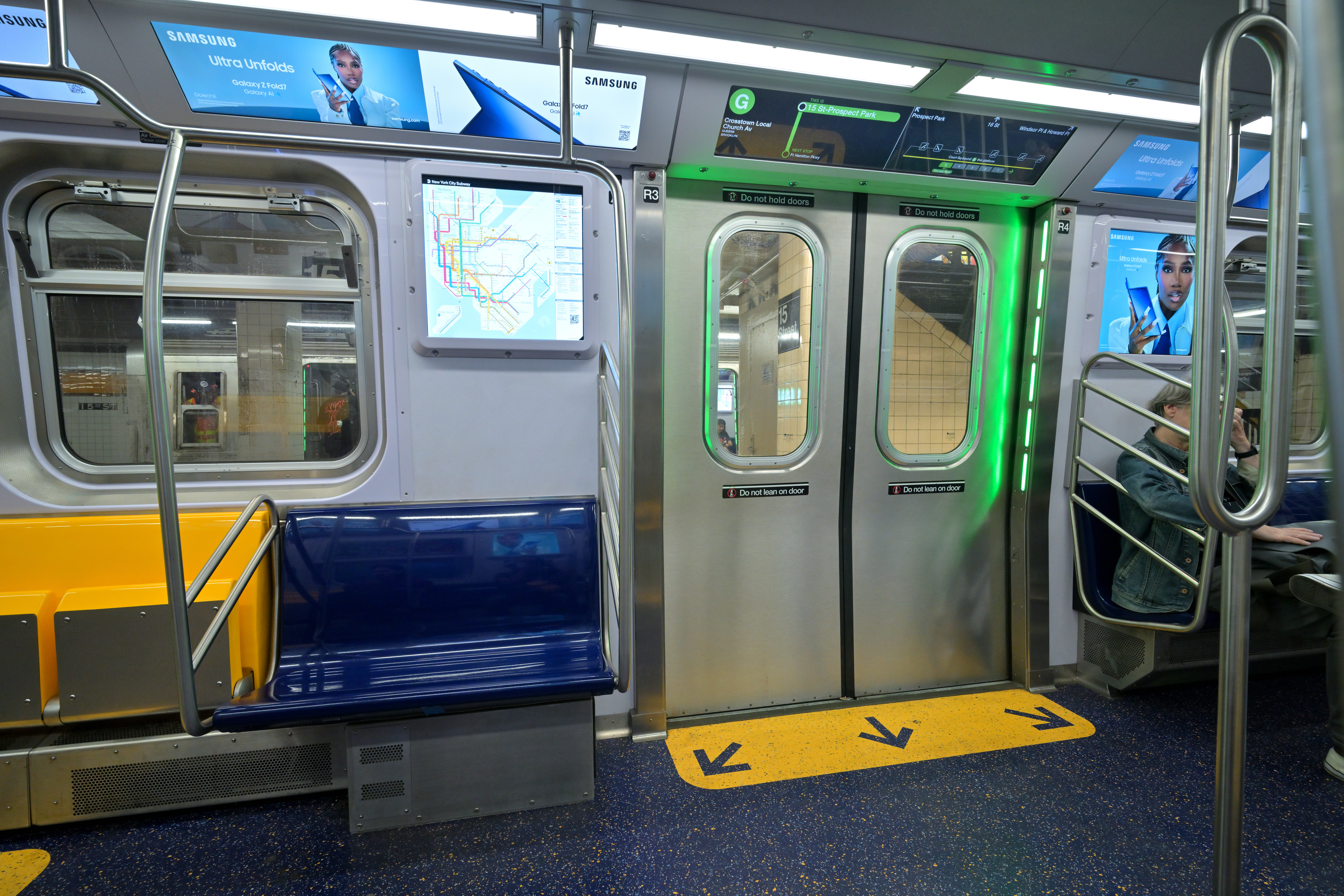
The interior of an R211 car, showing its wide doors, LCD screens, digital advertising, yellow flip-up seats, door opening indicators, and looped stanchions

Antenna Design New York designed the interiors of the R211s. Most of the seating on the inside is blue, though yellow flip seats are installed to allow space for wheelchairs. In contrast to older subway car models with L-shaped seating (like the R46 and R68), in which some seats are placed perpendicularly to the windows, the R211s' seats all face away from the windows. Designers at Antenna used gold seats to indicate priority seats for disabled and senior passengers, as riders often ignored priority-seating signs in older rolling stock models. There are also looped stanchions, a feature found in some R46, R62A, and R160 cars, as well as on all R179 cars. On the floors are decals with arrows indicating that passengers should move into the center of the car.

The R211s have white ceilings and walls to give the impression of a spacious interior, as well as LED lighting, which are angled to disperse the light throughout the car. The cars have digital advertisements, digital customer information displays, illuminated door opening alerts, and security cameras, unlike the older New Technology Trains, which lack these features.

There are 28 display screens inside each car, including updated digital displays over doors. The overhead screens display additional information, such as specific bus transfers, elevator locations, and which car the customer is located in. The screens on the walls display advertisements, public service announcements, notices, and subway maps.

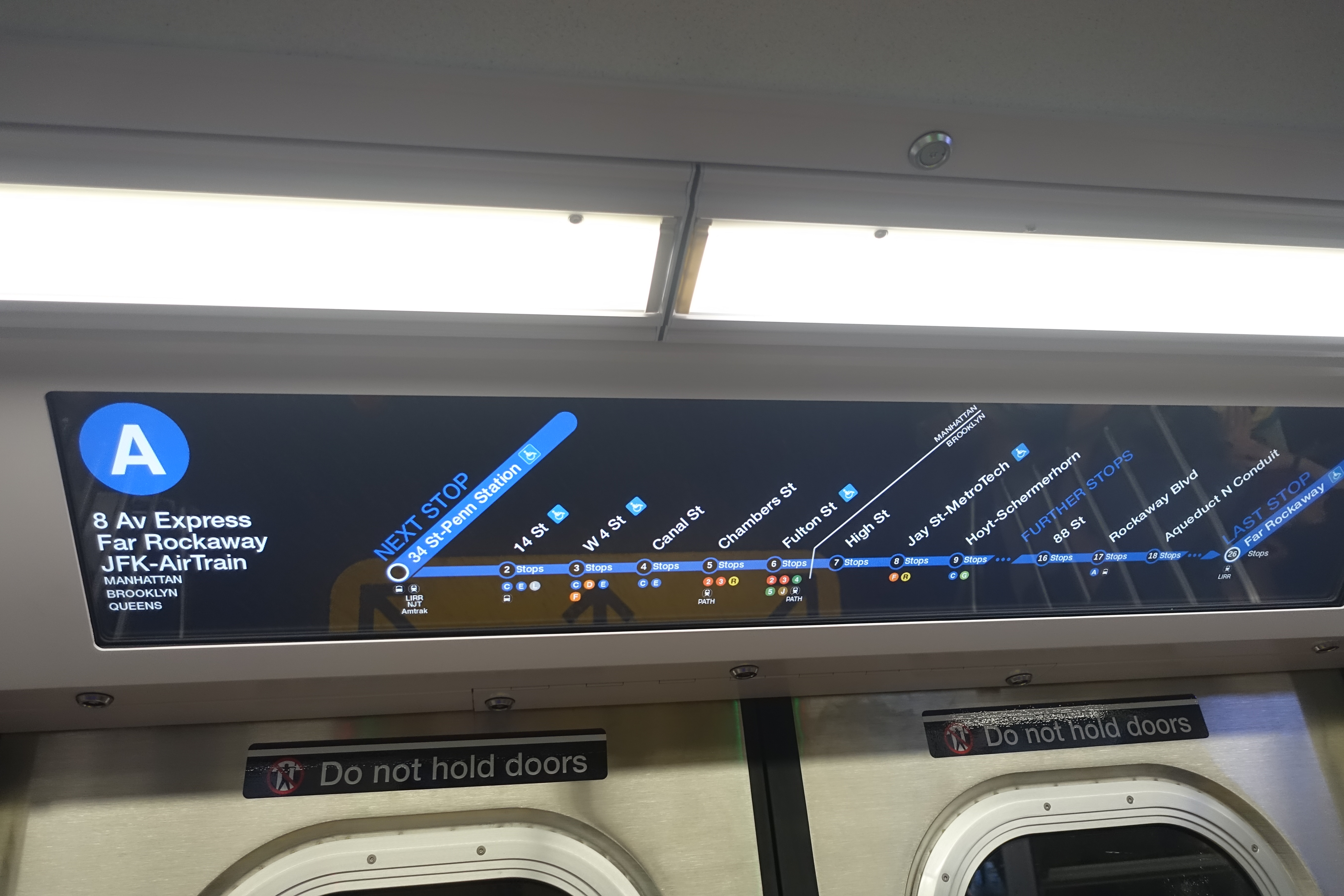
LCD screen displaying route info

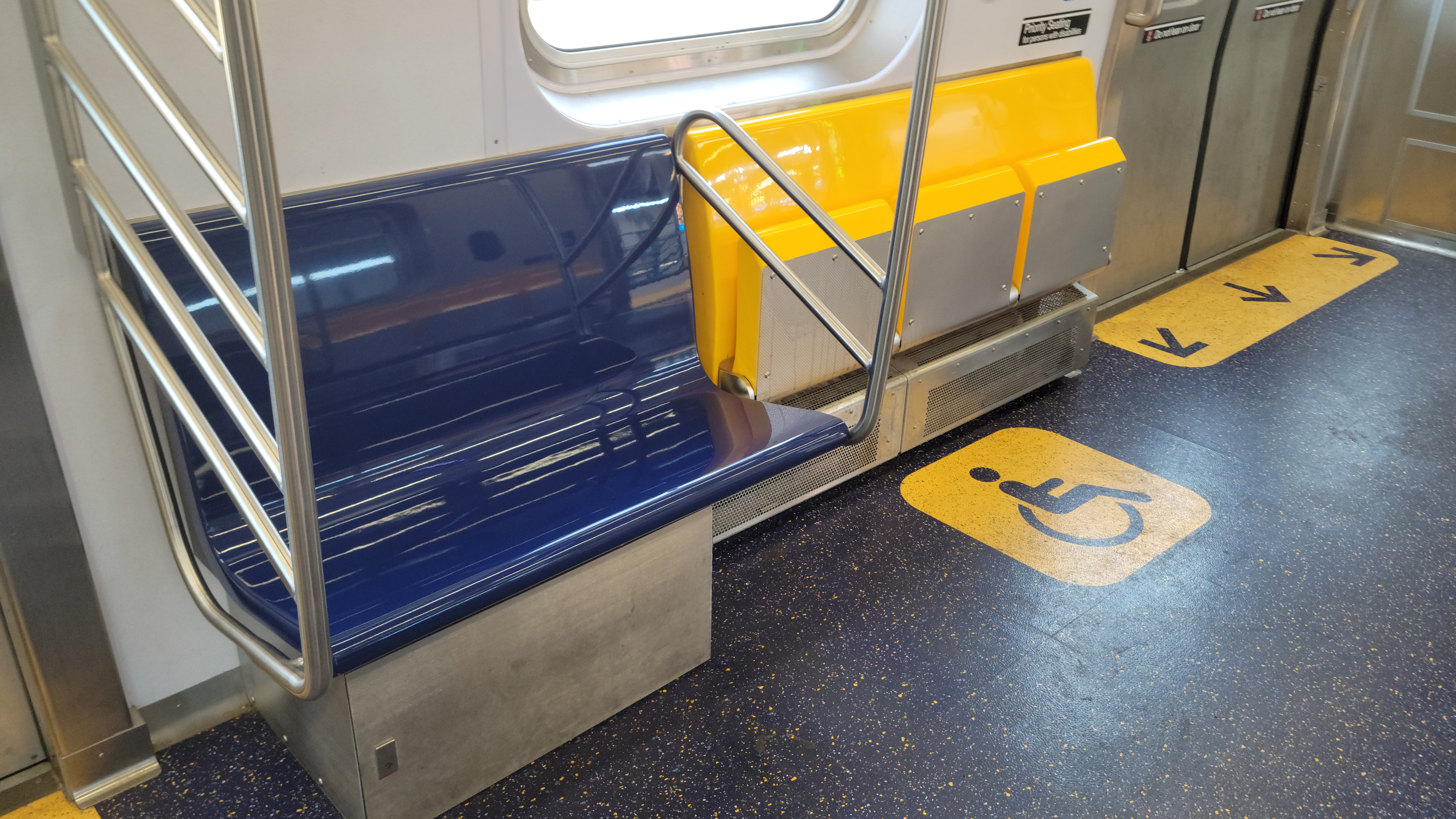
Flip seats are installed to provide space for wheelchairs

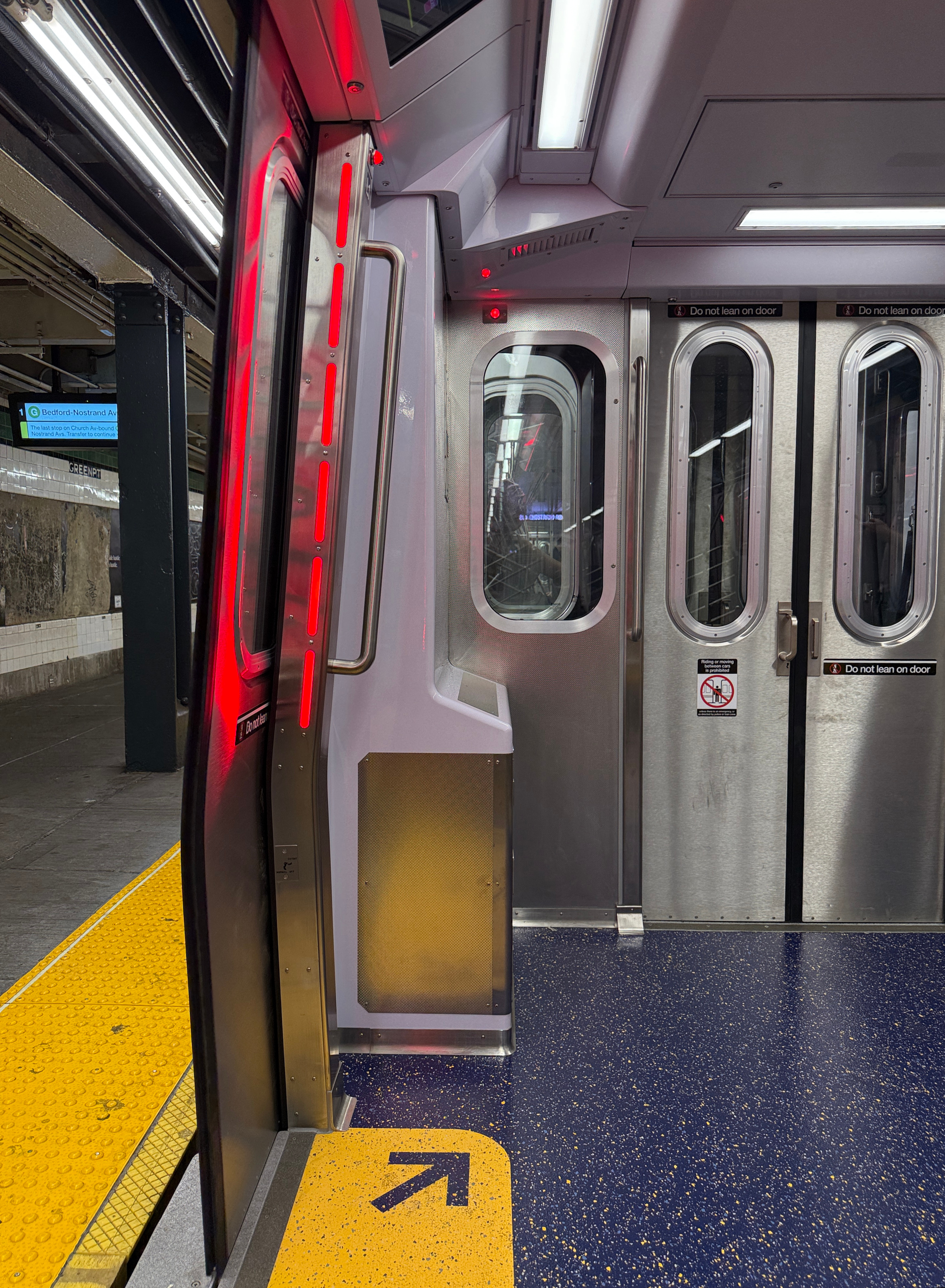
Door indicators turn to flashing red when the doors close

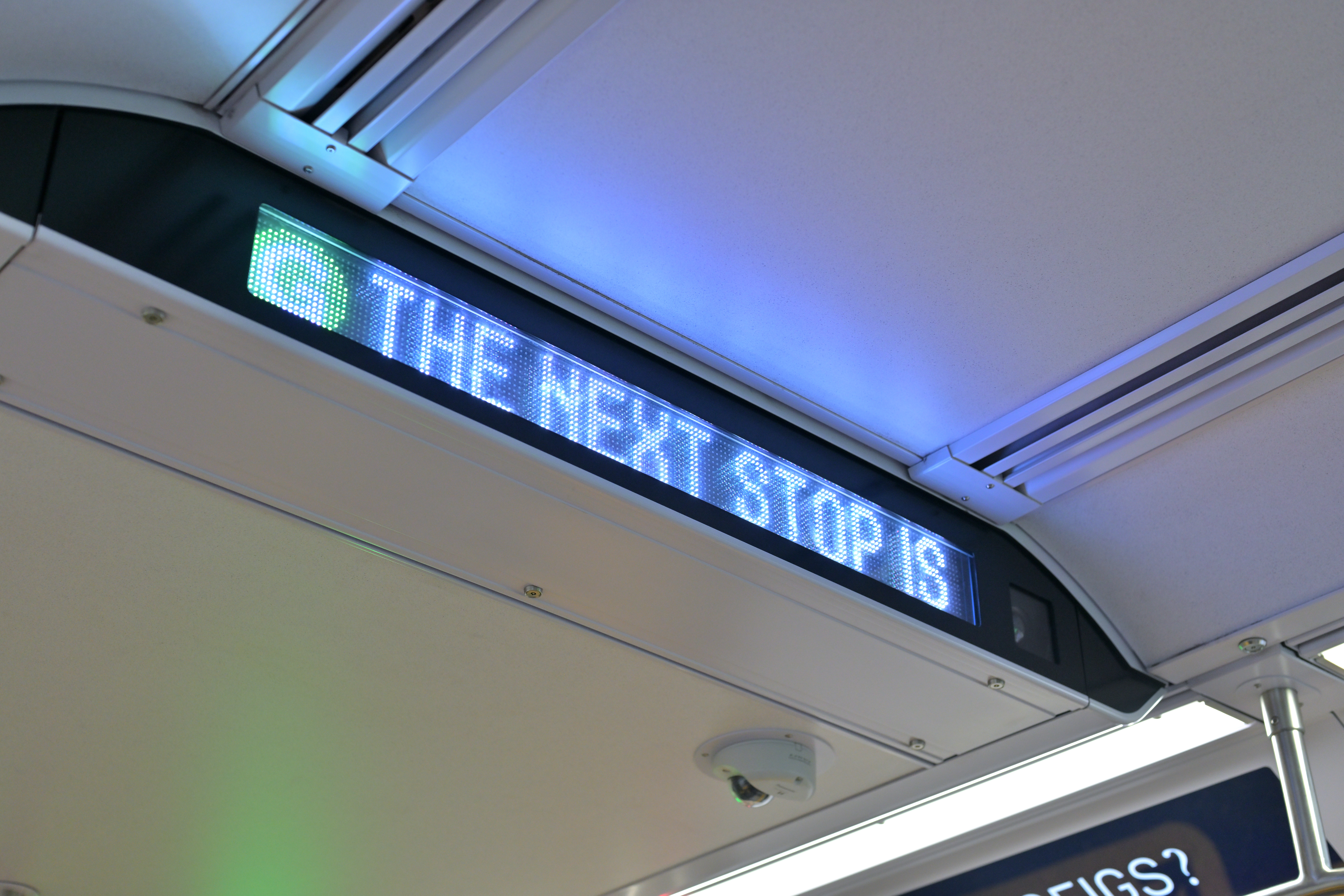
Interior LED sign and security camera

==== Open-gangway trains ====
It was announced in July 2016 that some of the cars would have open gangways, allowing passengers to see and walk through the entire length of the train. These cars, which are designated as R211T, are the first contemporary trainsets to have full-open gangways in New York, and the first open gangway cars in the system since the introduction of the BMT D-type Triplex in 1925, the MS Multi-section cars in 1934, and the Bluebird Compartment Cars in 1939. Similar open gangway designs are used in major cities such as Toronto (Toronto Rocket), London (S Stock) and Paris (MF 88 onwards). The open gangways also help prevent subway surfing, as subway surfers can no longer climb between cars to reach the train's roof, as was possible on older trains and the R211As.

The prototype cars consist of two designs. Two of the five-car sets utilize interior panels in the gangway connection ("hard shell"), and the other two five-car sets use interior bellows in the gangway connection ("soft shell"). Ultimately, the hard shell was chosen for the second option order, which will include 80 cars of the type.

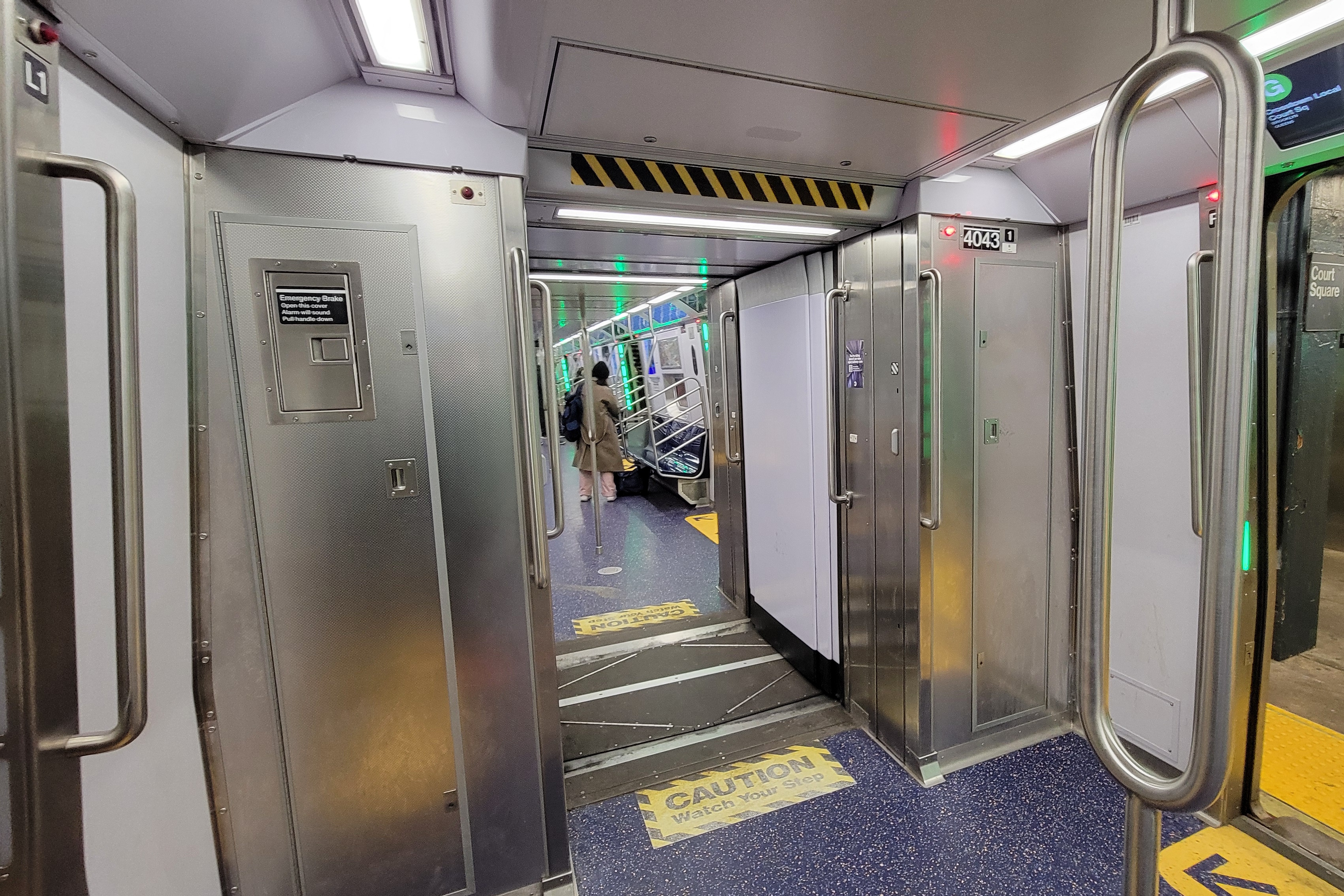
R211T interiors with "hard shell" open gangway

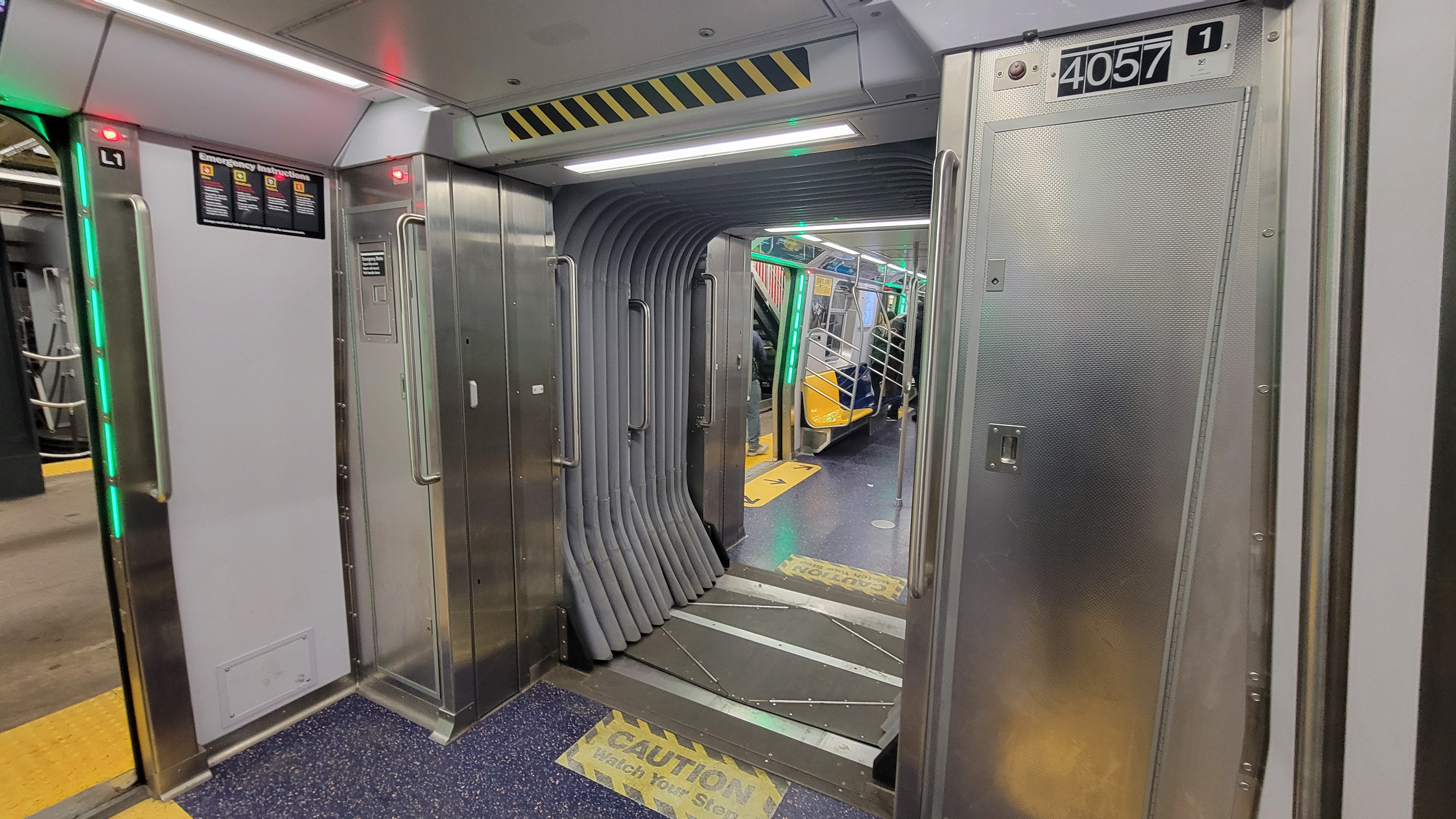
R211T interiors with "soft shell" open gangway

=== Mechanical and signaling systems ===
The cars use Alstom's OPTONIX propulsion system. Each car contains an on-board computer system that could detect breakdowns in critical systems such as braking and door-opening.

All R211A and R211T cars are equipped for communications-based train control (CBTC) in conjunction with the ongoing automation of B Division lines. They are also being retrofitted with 5G radios that would work with the CBTC signaling system. All R211S cars are equipped with pulse code cab signaling.

== History ==
=== Initial request for proposal ===
The R211 Design Master Plan was approved by the MTA in December 2011, and design planning began in December 2012. An R211 solicitation was posted in the classified section of Metro Magazine's May 9, 2013, issue, stating the proposal to acquire these cars in the near future. At the time, the order was planned to be 75 feet (23 m) in length, the same length as the R46 and R68 cars. Open-gangways, which would allow passengers to seamlessly walk throughout the train or units, and other alternate configurations were also initially considered for the entire order.

By the release of the MTA's 2015–2019 Capital Program in October 2015, the order specified 60-foot (18 m) cars, which has been the standard length of new B Division cars since the R143 order. As of March 2016, open-gangways will be tested on ten cars (now designated as the R211T). Additionally, the order was broken up into a base order of 565 R211A cars and two option orders: the first for 375 R211A cars, and a second for up to 520 R211As.

The request for proposal (RFP) was issued on July 22, 2016, and the contract was to be put out for bidding. With the RFP, the breakup of the order was changed. The base order consisted of 285 cars, with 10 R211T cars, 75 R211S cars, and 200 R211A cars. There were still two option orders; the first option order contained 740 cars (either R211As or R211Ts, depending on the success of the R211Ts in the base order), and the second base order contained 520 cars. The RFP closed in December 2016, and the contract was expected to be awarded in early 2017, at which time the existing R46 fleet would be 42 years old, making the oldest cars 51 years old, in 2026. However, in January 2017, the contract was pushed back to mid-2017.

The breakdown of the order was changed once again at the New York City Transit committee meeting on April 24, 2017. The base order now included 535 cars (an increase of 250 cars), with 10 R211T cars, 75 R211S cars, and 450 R211A cars. The option order now consisted of between 490 and 640 R211 cars. This change was made to allow for faster deliveries of the R211 cars. The R211As, with their standard configuration, would be delivered in 2021, earlier than the open-gangway R211T cars, which would not be delivered until at least 2023.

=== Contract ===
==== Creation of mockup and contract award ====
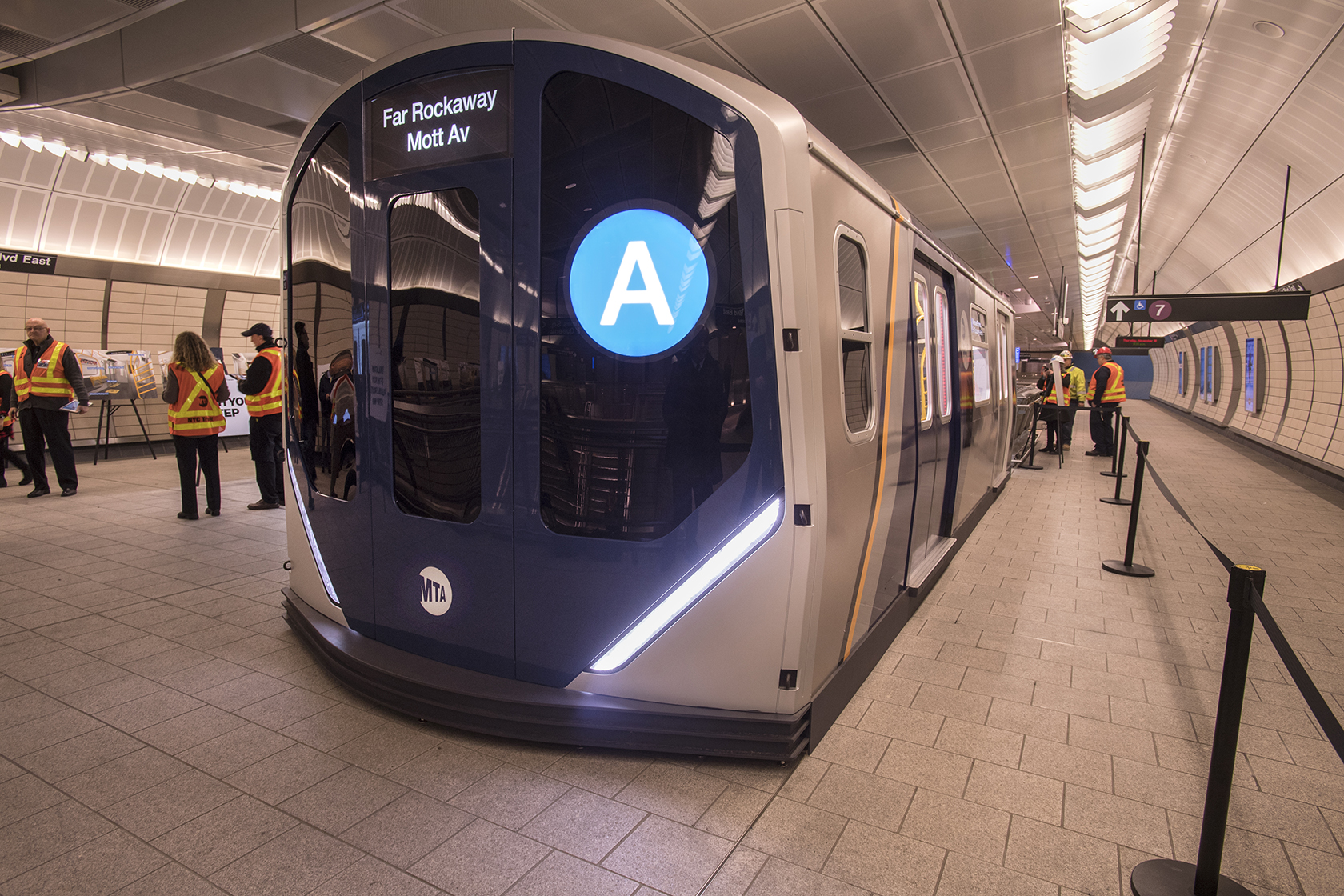
A full-size mock-up of the exterior of an R211 car, displayed at 34th Street–Hudson Yards station in 2017

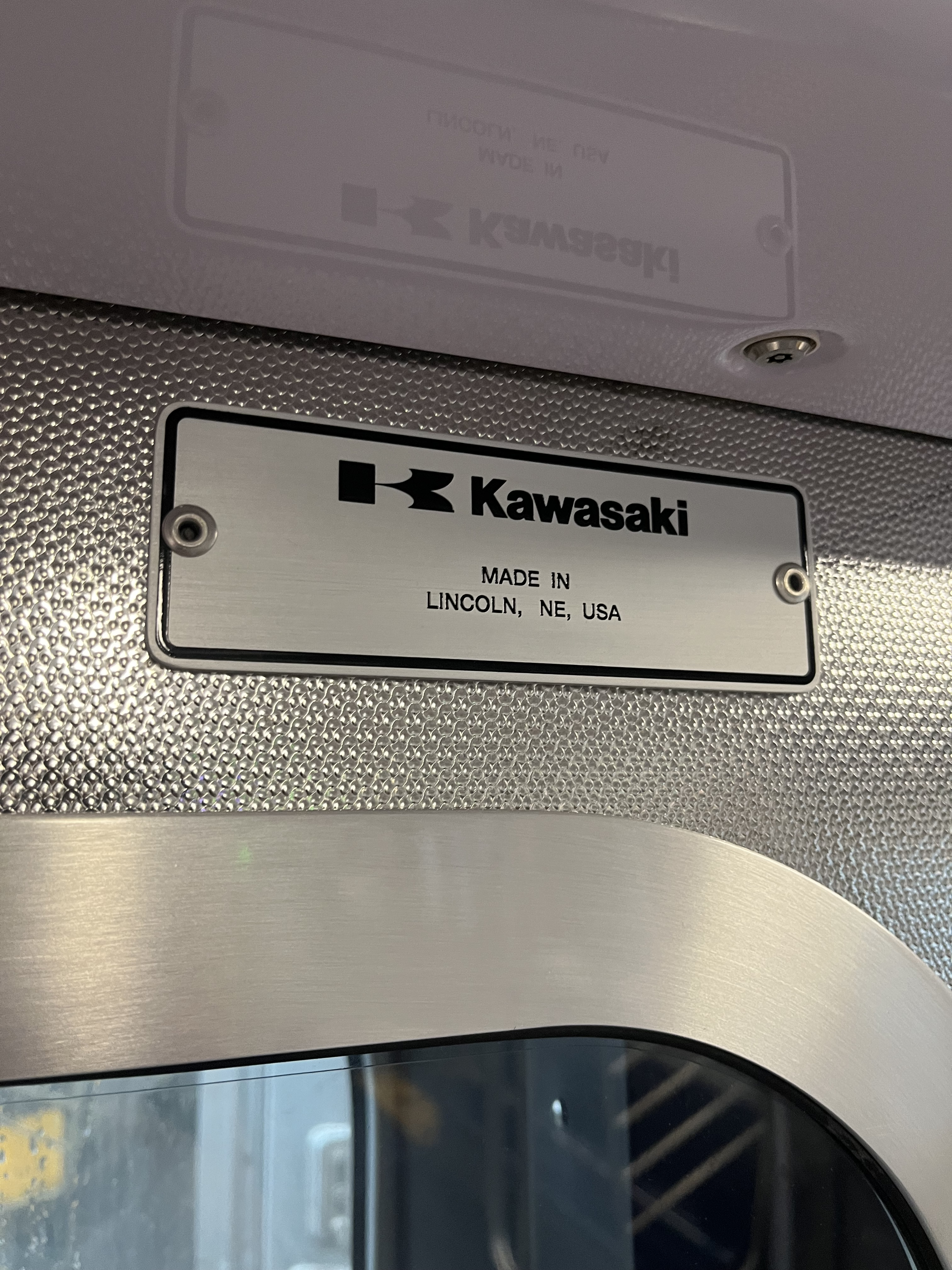
Builders plate of the R211 cars

In May 2017, the MTA quietly built a mockup of the R211 in a sparsely-used section of the 34th Street–Hudson Yards station's mezzanine, hidden behind a construction wall. The New York Daily News first reported on the mockup's existence in September of that year. The mockup contains features such as the open-gangway designs, digital screens showing next stops and their station layouts, multicolor lights next to the doors to indicate which set of doors will open, and a blue-and-gold-stripe paint design on its exterior. The model was completed and was made publicly accessible from November 30 to December 6, 2017, so riders could review it.

In August 2017, Bombardier Transportation, who was manufacturing the R179s at the time, was banned from bidding on the R211 contract due to various delays and problems associated with the R179 contract. Shortly afterward, it was reported that CRRC had also opted out of contention for the R211 contract, leaving Kawasaki Heavy Industries and Alstom Transport as two of the likely bidders for the contract.

On January 19, 2018, the MTA Board suggested that Kawasaki Rail Car, Inc, a subsidiary of Kawasaki Heavy Industries of Kobe, Japan, be awarded the $1.4 billion base order for the first 535 new R211 cars. The cars were anticipated to be delivered from 2020 to 2023, with the option orders to be delivered by 2025. The R211 base order includes 20 R211T cars with open gangways; 75 R211S cars for the Staten Island Railway, to be delivered near the end of the base order; and 440 R211A cars similar to the R143/R160 series. All cars in the base order will operate in five-car units. The first test train was then expected to be delivered in July 2020, with the production cars being delivered between 2021 and 2023. The R211A/T cars are being assembled at Kawasaki's factories in the U.S. at Lincoln, Nebraska, while the R211S cars are being assembled at Yonkers, New York. In October 2019, the MTA Board ratified a contract with Thales Group (since acquired by Hitachi Rail) for the installation of CBTC equipment in 92 five-car R211 sets.

==== Option orders ====
In October 2018, it was noted that the second option order would consist of 89 sets, and in September 2019, it was confirmed that the 89 sets would be formed from 437 cars. (Note: An option order with 333 cars would only result in 83.25 train sets of four cars, but an MTA board meeting document from October 2018 mentions 89 four- and five-car trainsets in the second option order, all of which would be equipped with communications-based train control. Assuming all 437 cars will be equipped with CBTC, the order would have to be divided into 81 five-car sets, totaling 405 cars, plus 8 four-car sets, totaling 32 cars.) The MTA also confirmed in September 2019 that the first option order would also consist of 640 cars. (Note: If the second option had 333 cars, there would 88 cars in 22 sets of four cars each, and 245 cars in 49 sets of five cars each.: If the second option had 437 cars, there would be 32 cars in 8 sets of four cars each, and 405 cars in 81 sets of five cars each.) The entire order will consist of 1,612 cars with both options exercised. During that time, delivery of the base order was expected to be completed by August 2023, with option 1 and option 2 completed by December 2024 and October 2025 respectively.

In March 2022, the MTA Board voted to add CBTC equipment to another 128 five-car units as part of the first option order. That October, the MTA Board voted to exercise the first option order for 640 cars, along with related non-car items, at a cost of $1.7 billion. All cars in the first option order would be R211A cars. The cars in the option order would be delivered from February 2025 to December 2026. In October 2023, the MTA Board voted on adding CBTC equipment to another 89 R211 sets as part of the second option order.

On December 16, 2024, the transit committee of the MTA Board voted to approve the second option order. The second option was revised from 437 cars to 435 cars linked in 87 five-car sets, of which 355 would be R211A cars and 80 would be the hard shell open gangway R211T cars. This option, along with some related non-car options would cost $1.3 billion. It was expected that these CBTC-equipped cars would begin to be delivered in 2027 and 2028, and would replace R46 and R68 subway cars.

==== Delays in delivery ====
By January 2019, the first R211A train was scheduled to be delivered in July 2020, but was delayed to January 2021. Thereafter, new R211 cars would have been produced and delivered at a rate of 30 to 40 cars per month. The first two test trains of ten R211T open-gangway cars would have been delivered in May 2021, followed by the first 5-car set of R211S cars for the Staten Island Railway in December 2021. Under the schedule outlined in January 2019, the base order of R211 cars would begin delivery in October 2021 and continue to be delivered through mid-2023. If the two option orders of 1,077 cars were exercised, deliveries would have continued through late 2025. A decision on whether to make the first option order as open-gangway or standard trainsets was needed to be decided by late 2022; by late October 2022, the first option order was confirmed to comprise standard trainsets. It was also announced in January 2019 that Kawasaki had made a full-car mock-up of the R211 fleet.

In late November 2020, the MTA announced that delivery of the first cars was delayed to the first quarter of 2021. The onset of the COVID-19 pandemic had impacted global supply chains and manufacturing, so the delivery of the first cars was delayed by between 9 and 14 months. By January 2021, the first cars were scheduled to arrive in April. The R211T open-gangway test trains were delayed to April 2022, while the R211S Staten Island Railway test train was delayed to August 2022. Deliveries of the base order of R211As were scheduled for September 2022 to September 2024, while deliveries of the R211S cars were scheduled for October 2023 to June 2024. Kawasaki planned to deliver 22 cars per month, a rate that an independent engineering consultant for the MTA described as "aggressive".

In late March 2021, TV station NY1 reported that delivery of the first cars had slipped further, with the arrival of the first cars delayed to June 2021. At its June 2021 meeting, the MTA's Capital Program Oversight Committee announced the R211A pilot had been delayed to July 2021 and the R211T test train had been delayed to June 2022. The production of the R211A base order, the R211S test train, and the rest of the R211S order had the same timeline as was outlined in January 2021. Some of the other issues with the test train, such as cracks in the HVAC frame, had been identified in previous months and fixed. The base order of R211As had to be underway by November 2023 so there would be enough cars to test a communications-based train control (CBTC) system being installed on the IND Eighth Avenue Line. By July 2022, full delivery of the R211A base order and the R211S order had been delayed to 2025 due to labor issues at Kawasaki's Nebraska factory. Kawasaki was obligated to construct 40 cars per month in Nebraska as part of its contract with the MTA. The R211 fleet won the Nebraska Chamber of Commerce's "Coolest Thing Made in Nebraska" contest for 2022.

In January 2024, issues with the Automatic Speed Control (Staten Island Railway's implementation of pulse code cab signaling) software was discovered on the R211S cars, delaying the start of the 30-day in-service test until August 2024, and the beginning of deliveries for production cars until later in 2024.

==== Delivery ====
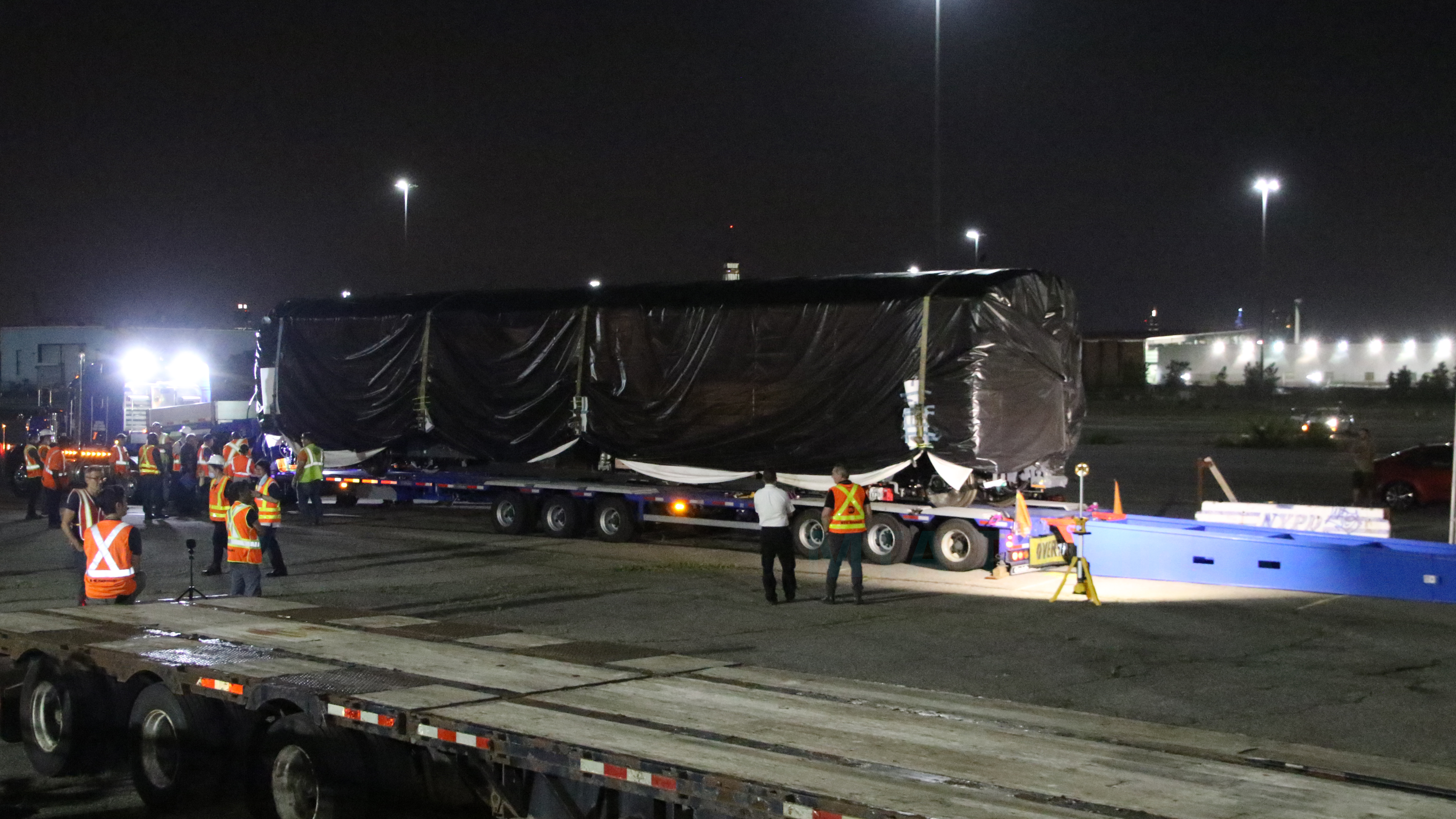
R211A 4064 being delivered on June 29, 2021

Starting on June 29, 2021, the first set of R211A cars was delivered to the New York City Transit Authority at the South Brooklyn Marine Terminal. The test train was delivered despite a lack of staff in Nebraska and a shortage of important parts, which prompted an independent engineering consultant to predict that delivery of the test train could be delayed past July 2021. By June 2024, 235 R211A cars were delivered with 190 in service.

The first of the R211T cars with the hard shell gangway design (4040–4049) were delivered in November 2022. By December 2022, the set began testing. The cars with the soft shell gangway design (4050–4059) were delivered a few months later, in January and June 2023.

On the first week of May 2023, the first set of R211S cars (100–104) was delivered to the South Brooklyn Marine Terminal, forming a complete pilot five-car train for acceptance testing and evaluation. After undergoing several tests on New York City Subway trackage, the unit was transported to Staten Island during the week of October 16, 2023.

=== Service ===
Malfunctioning LCD route map of an R211

The R211A cars were placed into revenue service on the A on March 10, 2023, for a 30-day in-service acceptance test. After successful completion, R211A cars officially entered revenue service on June 29, 2023, several months later than originally planned. During a press conference at Hoyt–Schermerhorn Streets the same day, it was announced that at least two R211A trains would enter service per month. During a media preview of the R211T cars in February 2023 at Coney Island Yard, it was announced that the R211T cars were expected to enter revenue service in late 2023. This was further confirmed during another press conference in late June 2023, during which it was also announced that the R211S cars would enter service in January 2024. However, in June 2024, it was announced that the R211S 30-day revenue entry had been delayed until August 2024.

In late October 2023, all but one train of active R211A cars were temporarily pulled from service. A video had circulated online showing an out of service train traveling at a very slow speed with flat wheels. The MTA later confirmed that the cars were out of service due to multiple issues, including leaking gearboxes which had caused the flat wheels on the aforementioned set. The agency began to return the trains to service within weeks, after fixes were completed. The repairs to the R211As did not delay the delivery of the R211S fleet. By January 2024, deliveries of R211As had resumed. The R211As also began operating on the B route in July 2025. As of June 2026, R211s were soon expected to enter service on the D, followed by the N, Q, and W routes.

The MTA separately indicated that when revenue-service testing of the R211Ts began, they would initially run on the C route because that route made local stops, making it easier to monitor problems with the trains. At the time, internal MTA policy allowed the R211T to be used only on routes where stops were spaced no more than four minutes apart; only the C and R routes fit this criterion. The R211Ts began running in revenue service on the C route on February 1, 2024. In June 2024, the MTA announced that it expected the first R211S to enter service before the end of that year. The first R211S train began running on the Staten Island Railway on October 8, 2024. When option 2 was announced in December 2024, the MTA announced that two of the five-car open gangway trains would begin operating on the G route in early 2025, and the first R211Ts entered service on the G that March. The 80 R211Ts in option 2, which have slight differences from the original hard-shell test train, would be able to operate on any route in the B Division.

In July 2025, Hitachi Rail and Siemens Mobility received a contract to retrofit the R211A and R211T fleets with 5G radios. Alstom received a contract that month to manufacture propulsion systems for the 435 cars in option 2. The final R211S cars were delivered in September 2025. By mid-September 2025, the R211S had fully replaced the R44 trains on the Staten Island Railway, with remaining R44 cars relegated to a contingency fleet. R211A trains had replaced all the R46s on the Rockaway Park Shuttle by June 2026, and they began running on the D route that July. They are expected to enter service next on the N, Q, and W routes.

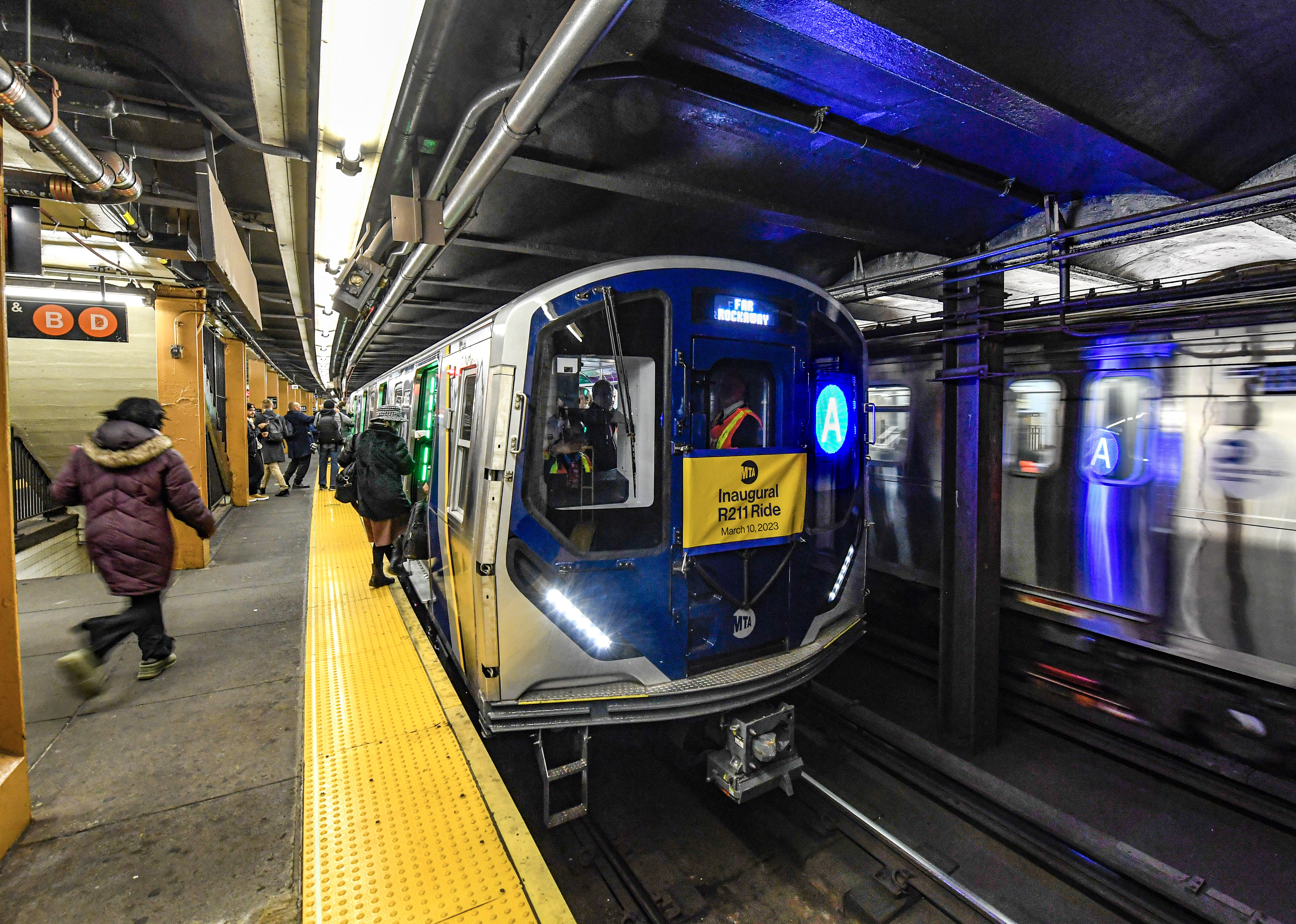
The first R211A train during its inaugural revenue service run on March 10, 2023

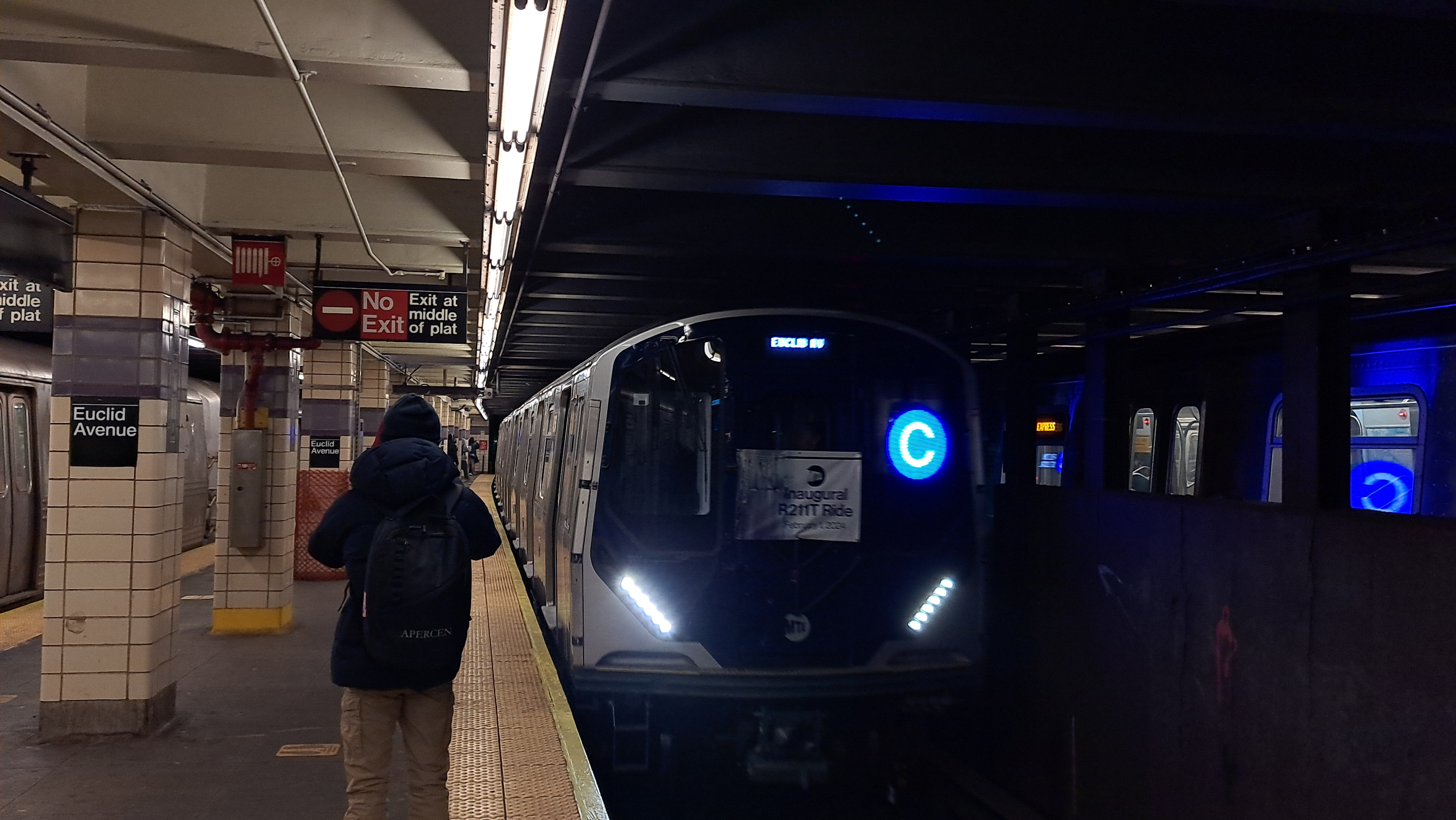
The first R211T train during its inaugural revenue service run on February 1, 2024

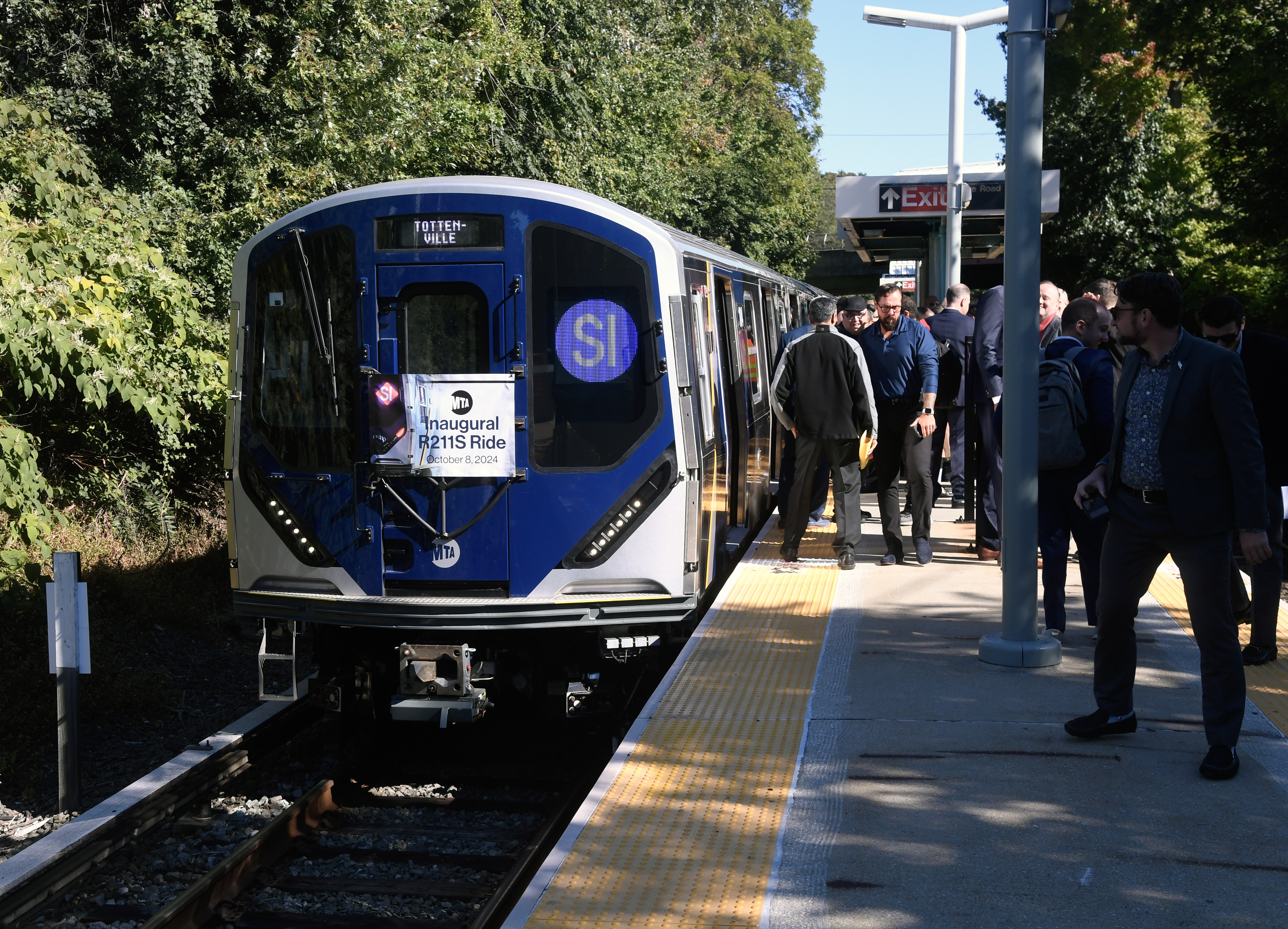
The first R211S train during its inaugural revenue service run on October 8, 2024
