= Priority seat =

Public transport designated for people with difficulties

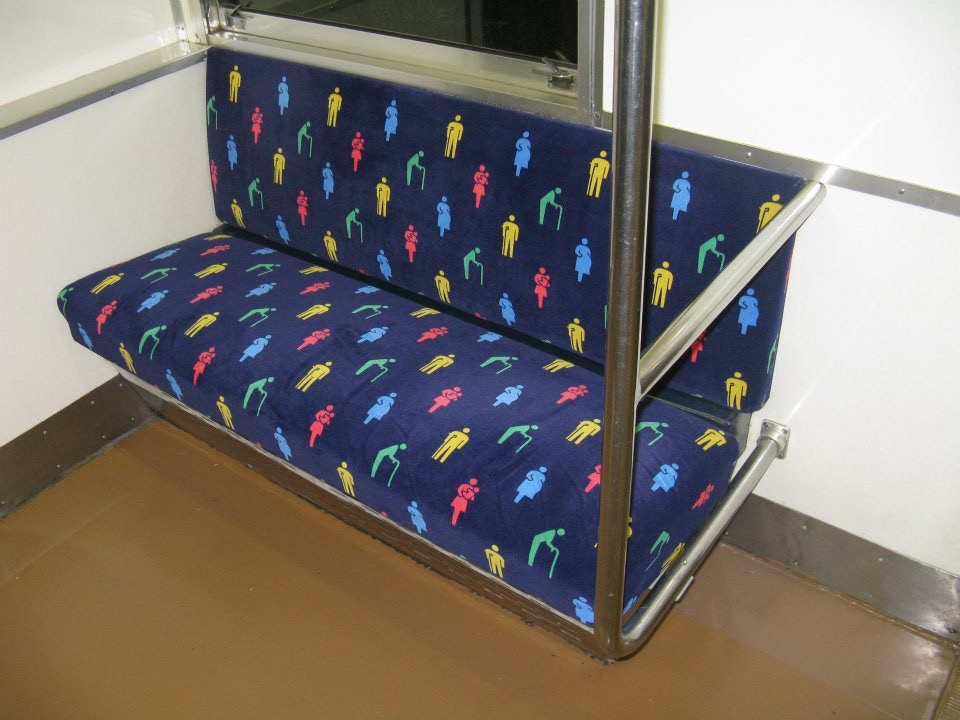
In Japan, the priority seat often has depictions of four common types of people that the seats are reserved for: elderly, physically disabled/injured, pregnant women, and adults carrying infants

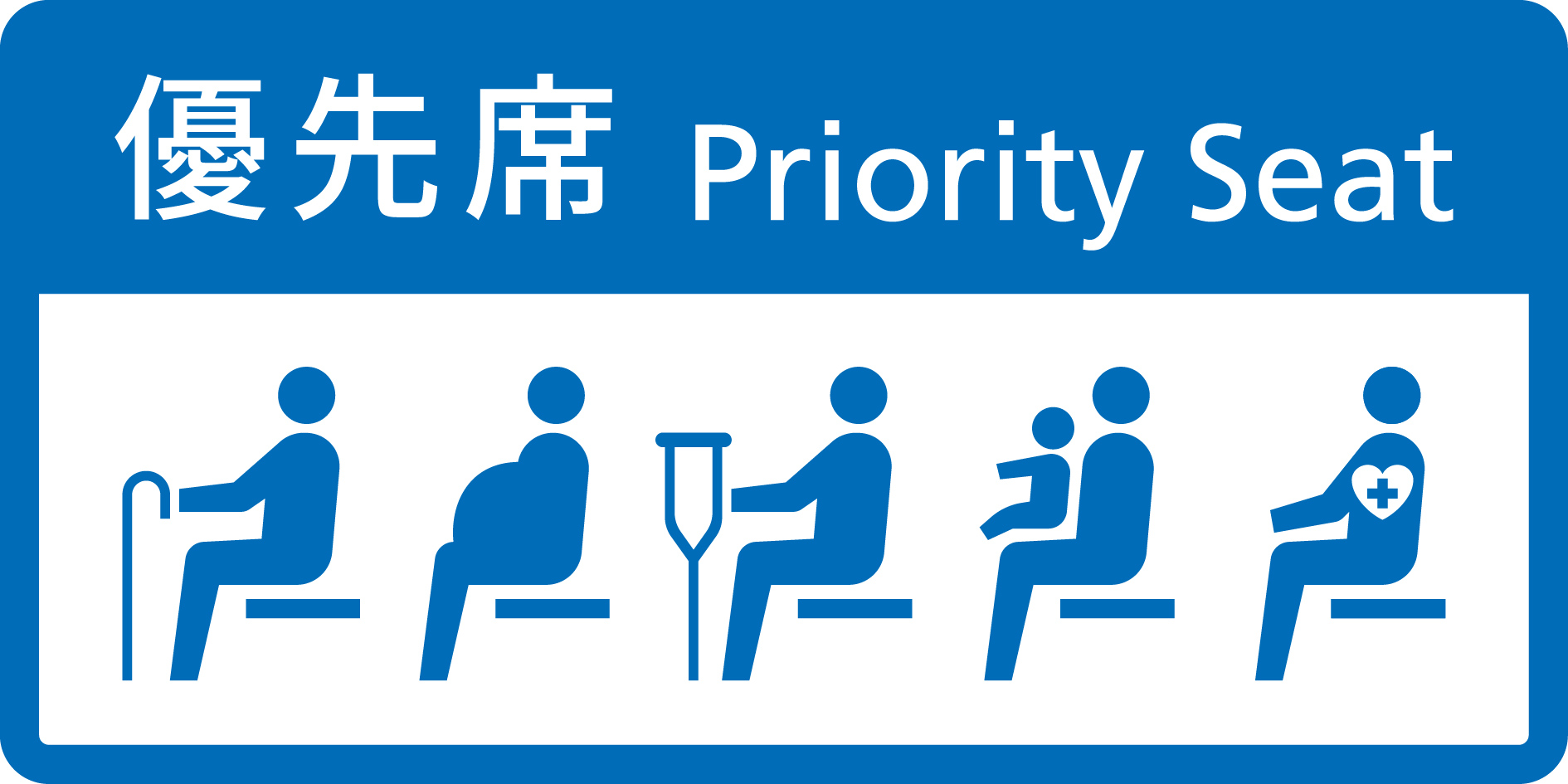
Official sign in Taiwan indicating that priority seats are for disabled, pregnant, elderly, baby-holding, and other passengers who need them.

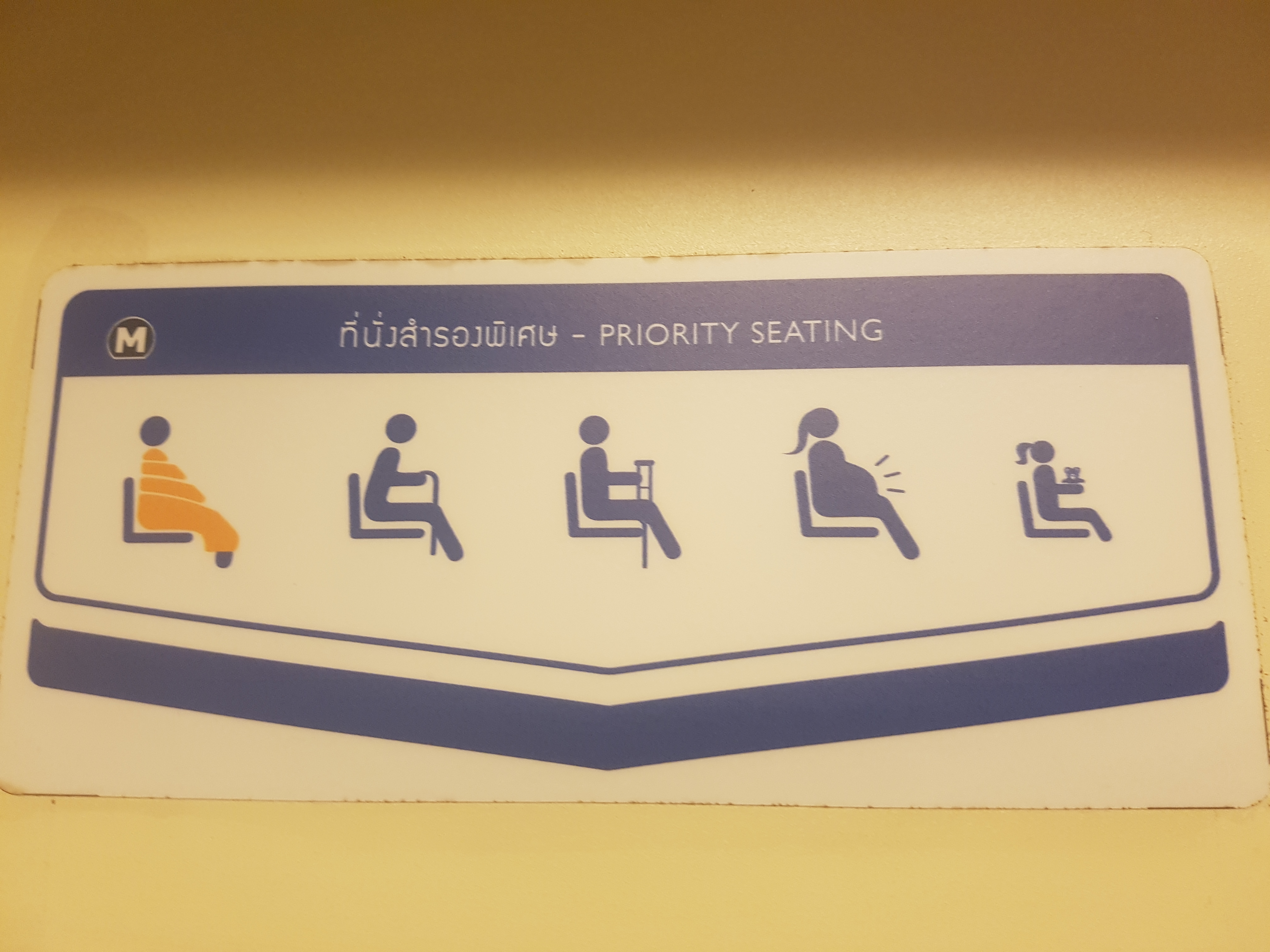
In Thailand, priority seats are given to Buddhist monks, elderly persons, disabled persons, pregnant women, and children.

Priority seats are seats in public transport vehicles that have been designated for elderly, disabled, pregnant, sick, and injured passengers, or those carrying babies, to ride public transport with an equal degree of access and comfort as other passengers. Priority seats can be found on various public transportation channels, including trains, buses, and trams. The phrase "Please offer your seat to anyone in need" is often displayed beside the seat. In most cases, there is no regulation to restrict the use of priority seats, but rather an expectation to offer one's seat to those in need.

== Objectives ==
Under the principle of "Barrier Free Environment", the idea of "priority seats" was first introduced in northern Europe. Providing unimpeded, effortless access and an ideal living environment to all people is the final goal. Over the past centuries, the idea of priority seats has spread to Asian countries such as Japan, Taiwan, and Korea, in which a cultural emphasis on politeness encourages the young and able-bodied to yield their seats to those in need. Failure to do so would be regarded as disrespectful. Countries such as Australia, Malaysia, Singapore, and China have similar traditions. In addition, railways in some countries – for instance the Southern and Great Northern routes in England – allow qualifying passengers to apply for and obtain priority seat cards which they can show to fellow passengers to prove their eligibility.

Priority seats motivate people to offer seats to those with special needs. Taking the initiative to give seats to them prevent accidents when travelling on public transport. According to the Press Release of The Kowloon Motor Bus in 2011, priority seats are designed to provide people with special needs a safe and enjoyable journey. Such passengers, including the elderly and people with mobility obstacles, may face special inconveniences and difficulties during travelling. Introducing priority seats encourages individuals to bear the social responsibility of caring for others in need. The motion encourages people to be sensitive about other people's needs and take actions of empathy and altruism.

In some jurisdictions, priority seating is mandated by legislation. The Accessibility for Ontarians with Disabilities Act, 2005 in Ontario, Canada stipulates that all transport providers must provide "clearly marked courtesy seating for persons with disabilities [...] located as close as practicable to the entrance door of the vehicle".

Some disabilities are more difficult to recognize. The Toronto Transit Commission reminds everyone of the possibility that people who refuse to offer their seat may have a hidden disability that is either not likely to be recognized or a disability that is uncomfortable to discuss in public.

== In different localities ==
The "yield the seat culture" has existed for many years in various countries around the world, including in ancient Sparta.

=== Australia ===
Priority seats on public transport are an aspect of Australian culture. It is expected for students with state-sponsored transport passes, who usually attend schools outside of their local area, to give up their seats to paying passengers, who are usually working adults and local residents. It is considered polite to give up seats to the elderly, though some young people do not expressly follow this custom. In Melbourne, passengers who do not concede their seats to standing passengers with special needs when asked to do so are subject to a fine of $147.61 AUD.

=== Hong Kong ===
In Hong Kong, priority seats were first introduced in the MTR in 2009 with the "Priority Seats Campaign". The Smiley World Characters, large red stickers with big smiley faces, were stuck on the top of the priority seats to attract people's attention.

After the setup of priority seats in MTR, bus companies started to follow. Priority seats were introduced to 87 buses of the Kowloon Motor Bus Company (KMB) in May 2011, which was followed by Citybus and New World First Bus (NWFB) in June 2012. In each bus, several priority seats are located at the front of the lower deck. The headrests of such seats were green, and they are marked with the words "PRIORITY SEAT" and symbols of disabled, elderly, and pregnant people. Advertisements were also broadcast in order to raise the awareness of passengers about the priority seats. Receiving positive and supportive feedback after the 6-month trial, the KMB decided to have priority seats set up in all of its buses in 2012, as well as change their color to purple.

In minibuses, the priority seat is the closest to the door. In trams, there are a few priority seats offered near the driver in the lower deck. Furthermore, the Cathay Pacific airline offers priority seating for passengers with disabilities.

=== Japan ===
In Japanese, priority seats are usually called yūsen-seki (優先席). In English, some Japanese operators (such as Tokyo Metro, Tokyu, Tobu, Seibu) call them "Courtesy Seats" while some others (such as the JR Group, public subways, Keio, Odakyu, Keikyu, Hankyu, Kintetsu) use "Priority Seats".

In the case of the Sapporo Municipal Subway, the seats corresponding to priority seats are labeled as "Special Seats" (専用席, sen'yō-seki; lit. 'exclusive seats'), emphasizing that they are exclusively for vulnerable passengers rather than merely prioritized for them.

In Japan, the first full-scale initiative began on September 15, 1973 (which was then observed as Respect for the Aged Day), when Japanese National Railways (JNR) introduced the concept of "Silver Seats" (シルバーシート, shirubā shīto). These were first implemented on the Chūō Line (Rapid) and then gradually extended to the urban lines in Tokyo and Osaka. On the same day, Izuhakone Railway also adopted the "Silver Seat" designation on both its Sunzu and Daiyūzan Lines, using similar symbol designs.

The name "Silver Seat" is said to have originated when JNR first introduced the concept, targeting elderly passengers and distinguishing these seats from regular ones. An employee at JNR headquarters proposed changing the seat upholstery color to set them apart. As a result, they used surplus silver-gray moquette fabric—originally intended for standard-class seats on the 0 Series Shinkansen—which happened to be in stock at the Hamamatsu Works, to upholster the newly designated seats.

At that time, the term "Silver Seat" became widely recognized, and the word "silver" (シルバー, shirubā) itself, as a Wasei-eigo term referring to the elderly, also entered common usage.

Following this, other operators, including major private railway companies, began adopting similar practices. While private railways did not always follow the same seat fabric colors as JNR, many used the same pictograms (symbols) and adopted varied names such as "Silver Seat" or "Priority Seats (for the elderly and physically impaired)".

Initially, these seats were placed at the ends of the first and last cars, on the side opposite the driver's cab. Eventually, however, the practice shifted to designating one end of every car as a priority seating area, expanding the coverage.

From the late 1990s, as the target group for priority seating expanded to include not only the elderly and disabled, but also injured passengers, pregnant women, and those with infants or toddlers, many railway and bus operators began shifting from the elderly-focused term "Silver Seat" to more inclusive labels such as "Priority Seats" (優先席, yūsen-seki). In addition, especially among major operators in the Tokyo metropolitan area, some introduced design features like orange-colored hand straps near priority seats—pioneered by Odakyu Electric Railway—or different-colored flooring and handrails to help visually distinguish these areas.

On April 1, 1999, Hankyu Corporation, Kobe Electric Railway, and Nose Electric Railway, all part of the then Hankyu Toho Group (now Hankyu Hanshin Toho Group), abolished the designation of "Priority Seats" and declared all seats as Priority Seats. This initiative aimed to promote moral awareness among passengers and was based on the belief that forcing those in need to specific designated areas was undesirable. Instead, it encouraged a more benevolent mindset, allowing those in need to use the nearest available seat regardless of location.

However, over time, complaints began to emerge from people claiming that others were no longer offering their seats. This prompted Hankyu Corporation to reconsider its all-priority-seating policy at its 2007 shareholders' meeting. As a result, on October 29, 2007, it reverted to having designated Priority Seats. Kobe Electric Railway, Nose Electric Railway, and the Osaka Municipal Subway Sakaisuji Line, which offers through service with Hankyu, followed suit.

The Yokohama Municipal Subway also implemented a policy designating all seats as Priority Seats starting December 1, 2003. However, in response to passenger feedback, the bureau introduced Yuzuriai Shīto (ゆずりあいシート; lit. 'mutual-yielding seats') in late July 2012, as a category of highest-priority seating.

=== South Korea ===
Korean culture strongly recommends reserving seats for the elderly. Even if the entire car is overcrowded, the elderly seats are often empty. Seoul Metropolitan Government announced that it will apply a new design for pregnant women at Seoul Subway lines 2 and 5. Seoul Metropolitan Government expects that the change could allow passengers to yield their seats to pregnant women more easily.

In order to help people recognize that the seat is for pregnant women, the seat will change its color to pink from the back of the seat with a note that says 'This is the seat for a future protagonist' written on the bottom.

=== Taiwan ===
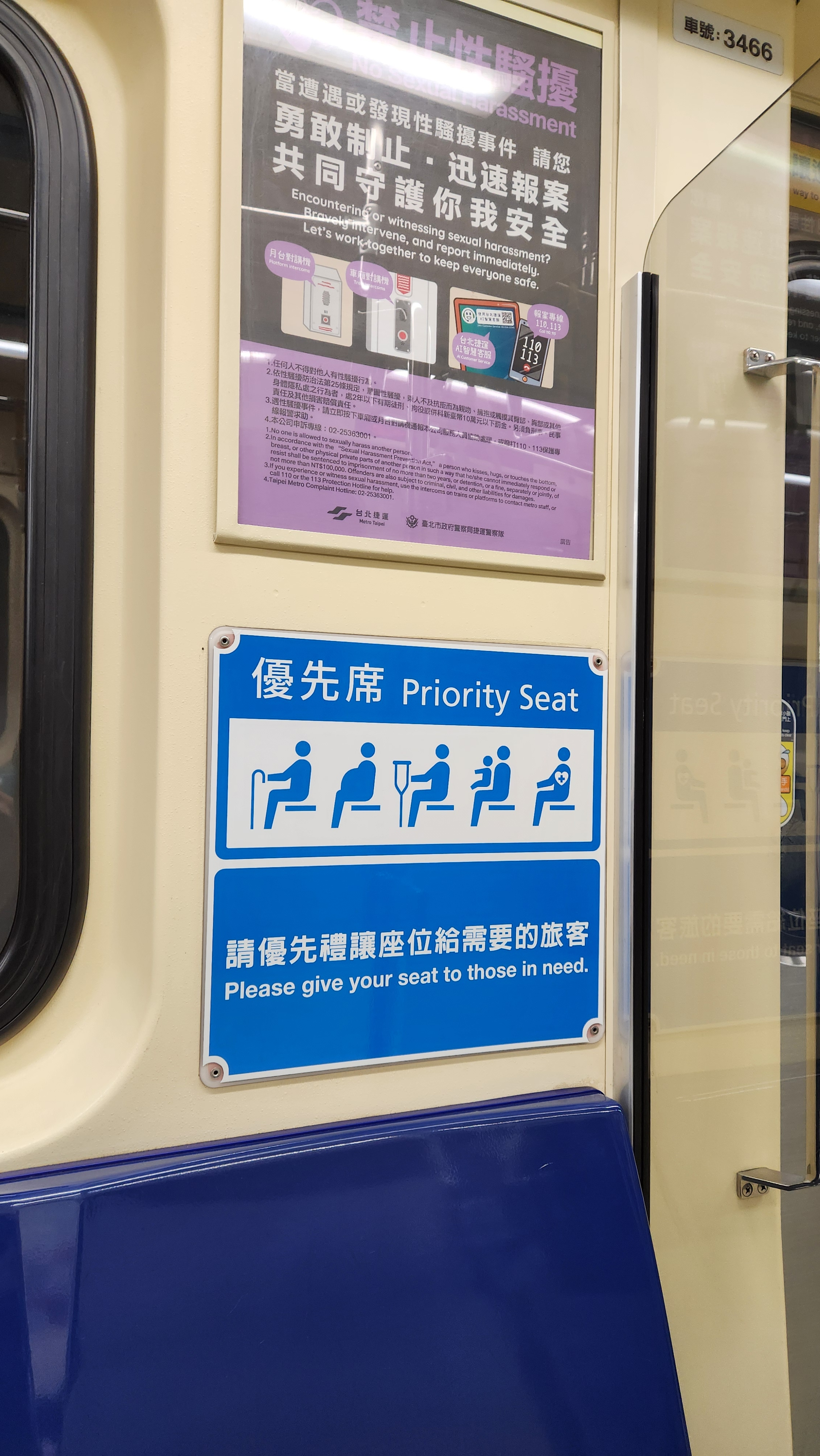
A priority seat in Taipei Metro, photographed in September 2025

In Taiwan, priority seats (優先座), once called courtesy seats (博愛座) in Chinese, are installed on public transportation according to the People with Disabilities Rights Protection Act (身心障礙者權益保障法). It originated in the 1980s, when elderly people began accidentally falling while boarding buses. The Taipei City Government, therefore, began to plan to set up a priority seat on the bus. On major vehicles, it is provided for those with mobility difficulties or needs. Signs asking people to yield their seats to the elderly, women, and children can be seen in public sites such as banks, airports, and hospitals. Children in Taiwan are also taught to give up priority seats. A "Yield the seat" culture is deeply rooted and has even become a reflex action.

In the 2010s, the media reported on disputes and controversies over priority seats, leading everyone to choose to stand, as no one was willing to sit in them. In June 2025, the legislature Yuan passed an amendment of the People with Disabilities Rights Protection Act, which renamed courtesy seats into priority seats, and emphasised that anyone who genuinely needs priority seats may sit down. In September, the Ministry of Transportation and Communications released a new unified icon to identify priority seats.

=== United States ===
In the state of New York, the transit authority is legally required to post signs reminding people to get up for elderly, pregnant, and disabled passengers. It is customary for people to get up for elderly, pregnant, and disabled passengers throughout the United States. Priority seats are also found on some other trains, including The Plane Train in Atlanta.

== Controversies ==
The issue of who can sit on priority seats has become contentious in some East Asian regions, in which refusal to yield priority seats has often been seen as an indicator of moral decay. There's a risk of people facing moral criticism, being scolded, cyberbullied, doxxed (The trend has become increasingly prevalent with the growing usage of smartphones and social media), or even being physically assaulted if others believe that the person sitting on priority seats does not need it. As a result, many people are reluctant to sit on priority seats, even when the train is full. It is common to see empty priority seats on an otherwise full train.

Options to address the issue are divided. The most common solutions proposed are mandating the offer of seats, publicising proper practices or abolishing priority seats. In Hong Kong, Michael Tien suggests mandating the offer of seats to people in need by law, like in "some cities in the United States, Canada and Australia". The HKSAR government prefers to promote such an act by advocating a culture of courtesy rather than through legal means. In Taiwan, a petition to abolish priority seats was submitted in 2016, forcing the Taiwan government to respond. The government stated that priority seating is based on the "People with Disabilities Rights Protection Act" that cannot be easily abolished, but promised to publicise proper practices of using priority seats.
