= List of New York City Subway R-type contracts =

This is a list of all R-type contracts in the New York City Subway.

== 1930–1950 ==
Contract number	Details	Unit number(s)	Manufacturer	Year manufactured	Status
R1 (R2)	Passenger cars (R2 was the truck/motor package for R1)	100–399	American Car & Foundry	1930–1931	Retired, 100/103/175/381 preserved
R3	Work/maintenance cars	01–06 (unpowered flat cars); 31–36 (track ballast gondola cars); 41–42 (powered yard shunting flat cars); 51 (supply car); 56 (pump car)	Magor Car Corporation	1931–1932	Retired, pump car 56 & flat car 41 preserved
R4 (R5)	Passenger cars (R5 was the truck/motor package for R4)	400–899	American Car & Foundry	1932–1933	Retired, 401/484/800/825 preserved
R6-3	Passenger cars	900–1149	American Car & Foundry	1935–1936	Retired, 923/925/978/983/1000/1144 preserved
R6-2	Passenger cars	1150–1299	Pullman	1936	Retired
R6-1	Passenger cars	1300–1399	Pressed Steel Co.	1936	Retired, 1300 preserved
R7	Passenger cars	1400–1474	American Car & Foundry	1937	Retired, 1440 preserved
R7	Passenger cars	1475–1549	Pullman	1937	Retired
R7A	Passenger cars	1550–1599	Pullman	1938	Retired, 1575 preserved
R7A	Passenger cars	1600–1649	American Car & Foundry	1938	Retired
R8	Crane car	71	Magor Car Corporation	1939	Retired
R8A	Work/maintenance cars	07–10 (unpowered flat cars); 66–67 (revenue collection cars)	St. Louis Car	1939	Retired
R9	Passenger cars	1650–1701	American Car & Foundry	1940	Retired, 1689 preserved
R9	Passenger cars	1702–1802	Pressed Steel Co.	1940	Retired, 1801/1802 preserved
R10	Passenger cars	1803–1852, 3000–3349	American Car & Foundry	1948–1949	Retired, 3184/3189 preserved
R11	Passenger cars	8010–8019	Budd Company	1949	Retired, 8013 preserved
R12	Passenger cars	5703–5802	American Car & Foundry	1948	Retired, 5760/5782 preserved
R13	Track cleaning unit	Never purchased			
R14	Passenger cars	5803–5952	American Car & Foundry	1949	Retired, 5871 preserved, 5944 in work service
R15	Passenger cars	5953–5999, 6200–6252	American Car & Foundry	1950	Retired, 6239 preserved

== 1951–1970 ==
Contract number	Details	Unit number(s)	Manufacturer	Year manufactured	Status
R16	Passenger cars	6300–6499	American Car & Foundry	1954–1955	Retired, 6305/6339/6387/6398 preserved
R17	Passenger cars	6500–6899	St. Louis Car	1954–1956	Retired, 6609/6688 preserved, 6835/6899 in work service
R18	Pump/hose car	Never purchased			
R19	Diesel locomotive (for R18)	Never purchased			
R20	Assorted work cars	X100–X103 (tank cars), C214–C216 (crane cars), D207–D210 (track ballast gondola cars), F111–F141 (flat cars)	Magor Car Corporation	1958	Retired, F116 preserved
R21	Passenger cars	7050–7299	St. Louis Car	1956–1957	Retired, 7194/7203 preserved, 7121/7287 in work service
R22	Passenger cars	7300–7749	St. Louis Car	1957–1958	Retired, 7371/7422 preserved, 10 in work service
R23	Hopper cars	H250–H279	Marshall Railway Equipment	1958	Retired
R24	Two wheel truing machines				
R25	One wheel truing machine				
R26	Passenger cars	7750–7859	American Car & Foundry	1959–1960	Retired, 7774–7775 preserved
R27	Passenger cars	8020–8249	St. Louis Car	1960–1961	Retired
R28	Passenger cars	7860–7959	American Car & Foundry	1960–1961	Retired, 7924–7927 preserved
R29	Passenger cars	8570–8805	St. Louis Car	1962	Retired, 8678–8679 preserved
R30	Passenger cars	8250–8351	St. Louis Car	1961	Retired
R30A	Passenger cars	8352–8411	St. Louis Car	1961	Retired
R30	Passenger cars	8412–8569	St. Louis Car	1962	Retired, 8481/8506/8522 preserved, 8429/8558 in work service
R31	Vacuum train	V285A–V285C			Retired
R32	Passenger cars	3350–3649	Budd Company	1964–1965	Retired, 22 preserved, 2 in work service
R32A	Passenger cars	3650–3949	Budd Company	1965	Retired, 22 preserved, 2 in work service
R33	Passenger cars	8806–9305	St. Louis Car	1962–1963	Retired, 17 preserved, 63 in work service
R33S	Passenger cars	9306–9345	St. Louis Car	1963	Retired, 17 preserved, 63 in work service
R34	Same as R11				
R35	Flat cars	F150–F164	Marshall Railway Equipment	1965	Retired
R36	Passenger cars	9346–9769	St. Louis Car	1963–1964	Retired, 9542–9543/9586–9687 preserved
R37	45-ton diesel-electric locomotives	50–53	General Electric	1965	In service
R38	Passenger cars	3950–4149	St. Louis Car	1966–1967	Retired, 4028–4029 preserved
R39	Passenger cars	120 cars; Never purchased			
R40	Passenger cars	4150–4349 (Originally 4150–4249, 4350–4449)	St. Louis Car	1967–1969	Retired, 4280–4281 preserved
R40A	Passenger cars	4350–4449 (slant-ended cars, originally 4450–4549); 4450–4549 (straight-ended cars, originally 4250–4349)	St. Louis Car	1967–1969	Retired, 4460–4461/4480–4481 preserved
R41	45-ton diesel-electric locomotives	54–59	General Electric	1968	In service
R42	Passenger cars	4550–4949	St. Louis Car	1969–1970	Retired, 5 cars preserved, 48 in work service

== 1971–1988 ==
Contract number	Details	Unit number	Manufactured	Year manufactured	Status
R43	45-ton diesel-electric locomotives	60–62	General Electric	1971	In service
R44	Passenger cars	5202–5479 (NYCT); 388–435, 436–466 (even) (SIR)	St. Louis Car	1971–1973	NYCT cars retired, 5240 preserved, SIR cars in service
R45	Crane cars	C218–C219	Atlas Car Manufacturing Co.	1973	Retired
R46	Passenger cars	5482–6258	Pullman	1975–1978	In service, 5551 preserved
R47	45-47-ton diesel-electric locomotives	63–70, N1–N2	General Electric	1975	In service
R48	Rail derrick cars & flat cars	C212–C213 (rail derrick cars); F224–F225 (flat cars)	Maxson Corp	1977	Retired
R49	Flat cars	F165–F184	Maxson Corp	1972	In service
R50	Signal supply cars	Never purchased (became the R74)			
R51A	Flat cars	F142–F149	Maxon Corp	1976	In service
R51B	Flat cars	F185–F199	Maxon Corp	1976	In service
R52	45-ton diesel-electric locomotives	71–82	General Electric	1977	In service
R53	Crane cars (1 ton)	C251–C255	Fuji Heavy Industries	1979	In service
R54	Supply cars	Never purchased			
R55	Passenger cars	Never purchased, but rebranded as R68 & R68A			
R56	Two-car rail welding unit	W301–W302	Maxson Corp	1981	In service
R57	Self-propelled crane car				
R58	Flat cars (for refuse)	RF01–RF27	Fuji Heavy Industries	1983	In service
R59	Track geometry car	TGC1	Plasser	1984	In service
R60	Track gang car	Never purchased			
R61	Self-propelled crane cars	C211, C216	Fuji Heavy Industries	1983	Retired
R62	Passenger cars	1301–1625	Kawasaki Heavy Industries	1983–1985	In service, 1366/1370 preserved
R62A	Passenger cars	1651–2475	Bombardier Transportation	1984–1987	In service, 1366/1370 preserved
R63	Track Geometry Car	TGC2	Plasser	1988	In service
R64	Door operator mechanism				
R65	Pump cars	PC01–PC03	Kawasaki Heavy Industries/New York Rail Car	1989	In service
R66	Tank cars	T204–T206	Fuji Heavy Industries	1983	In service
R67	Fabricated trucks (became R84–R87)				
R68	Passenger cars	2500–2924	Westinghouse-Amrail-ANF	1986–1988	In service
R68A	Passenger cars	5001–5200	Kawasaki Heavy Industries	1988–1989	In service

== 1989–1998 ==
Contract number	Details	Unit number	Manufacturer	Year manufactured	Status
R69	Prototype air conditioning for 8 B-Division passenger cars	Never purchased			
R70	Ballast cars	Never purchased			
R71	35 rider cars, 6 de-icer cars, 3 hose cars, 6 reach cars (passenger car conversions)	RD321–RD361 (rider, hose, and de-icer cars)	MTA (in-house)		Hose/reach & de-icer cars in service
R72	Flat cars	F200–F218, F221–F223, PF219–PF220	Garrett Corp	1983	In service
R73	Crane cars (2 tons)	C256–C258	Fuji Heavy Industries	1984	In service
R74	Signal supply cars	S01–S02	Fuji Heavy Industries	1984	In service
R75	5 diesel locomotives	Never purchased			
R76	Door modernization 900 cars (R26, R28, R29, R33, R36)				
R77	Model SL50 diesel locomotives	L883–L902	General Electric	1983	In service
R77E	Model SL50E electric locomotives (5 from R83 contract)	E01–E10	General Electric	1983	Rebuilt as R257
R78	Rail grinding car	RG24A1-1	Fairmont Rail	1983	Presumed retired
R79	Self-propelled rail changer	C259	Plasser	1985	Retired
R80	Hopper cars	H280–H297	Maxson Corp	1983	In service
R81	10 rider cars (passenger car conversions)	Incorporated into R71 contract			
R82	4 flat cars	Incorporated into R72 contract			
R83	5 electric locomotives & passenger cars	Electric locomotives incorporated into R77E contract, passenger cars never purchased			
R84–R87	2 prototype & 8 production trucks				Production trucks cancelled
R88	14 rail car movers				1 purchased
R89	Rail grinding car	RG24A1-12	Fairmont Rail	1985	Presumed retired
R90–R93	Pilot overhauls (4 cars)				
R94	Used flat cars	Cancelled			
R95	Revenue collection car-locker car pairs (passenger car conversions)	0R714/1R714–0R723/1R723	MTA (in-house)	1988	Retired, 0R714/1R714 preserved
R96	Overhaul 43 flat cars				
R97	1 vacuum train	Cancelled			
R98	Retrofit traction motors				
R99	Same as R29				
R100	2 crane cars	Never purchased			
R101	Reconditioned flat cars	F500–F529	LB Foster	1987	In service
R101A	Reconditioned flat cars	F531–F532	NYCT (in-house)	2001	In service
R102	Crane cars (10 tons)	C272–C280	Thrall Car Manufacturing Company	1989	In service
R103	Track ballast gondola cars	D437–D439	LB Foster	1990	In service
R104	Overhaul 13 locomotives, upgrade 22 other locomotives				
R105	1 ballast distributor				
R106	New car design – future cars	Incorporated into R110 contract			
R107	New car design – lightweight trucks				
R108	New car design – propulsion controls				
R109	New car design – auxiliary systems				
R110A	Prototype new technology passenger cars	8001–8010	Kawasaki	1992	Retired, in work service
R110B	Prototype new technology passenger cars	3001–3009	Bombardier Transportation	1992	Retired, 3007 preserved, 3001/3004–3006/3008 used for training
R111	Funding/purchasing 2 cranes				
R112	Dynamometer for track testing	Never purchased			
R113	Crane cars (3 tons)	C260–C271	Thrall Car Manufacturing Company	1991	In service
R114	20 flat cars	Cancelled			
R115	Prototype air conditioning unit designing & testing	Cancelled			
R116	Hopper cars	H310–H319	Thrall Car Manufacturing Company	1989	In service
R117	10 diesel-electric locomotives	Cancelled (design stage for R120)			
R118	3 hopper cars	Incorporated into R116 contract			
R119	2 crane cars (10 tons)	Incorporated into R102 contract			
R120	Diesel-electric locomotives	L903–L909	Republic Locomotive Works	1990–1991	In service
R121	Overhaul 22 flat cars and 2 crane cars				
R122	Overhaul 18 R51 flat cars				
R123	Continuous welded rail trains	ACR01–ACR08, BCR01–BCR08, CCR01–CCR08, DCR01–DCR08	MTA (in-house)	1989	Retired
R124	Ballast tampers cars	TP231–TP233			Presumed retired
R125	Model PBR-550 ballast regulator cars	BR002–BR003	Plasser		Presumed retired
R126	Same as R47 & R52				
R127	Refuse train propulsion cars	EP001–EP010	Kawasaki	1990–1991	In service
R128	Same as R123				
R129	Overhead cranes (for shop)				
R130	Same as R110A				
R131	Same as R110B				
R132	Replace Coney Island Yard cranes (planning MW104111)				
R133	Same as R58				
R134	Refuse train propulsion cars	EP011–EP018	Kawasaki	1994–1996	In service
R135	Overhaul 4 diesel locomotives				
R136	Same as R59 & R63				
R137	Vacuum trains	VT101–VT105, VT201–VT205	Socofer/Neu Transf'Air	1997 (VT1xx); 2000 (VT2xx)	Retired
R138	Same as R80				
R139	Overhaul 4 refuse flat cars				
R140	Rail grinding train	RG101–RG103	Harsco Track Technologies/Pandrol Jackson	2008	Presumed retired
R141	Flat cars	SIRT501–SIRT506, F601–F638	AMF Technotransport	1997	In service

== 1999–2019 ==
All passenger rolling stock made in this time period are New Technology Trains.

Contract number	Details	Unit number(s)	Manufacturer	Year ordered	Year manufactured	Status
R142	Passenger cars	6301–6980 (primary order); 6981–7180, 1101–1250 (option order)	Bombardier Transportation	January 1997 (primary order); March 1997 (option order)	1999–2002 (primary order); 2002–2003 (option order)	In service
R142A	Passenger cars	7211–7610 (primary order); 7611–7730 (option order); 7731–7810 (supplemental order)	Kawasaki	August 1997 (primary order); October 1997 (option order)	1999–2002 (primary order); 2002–2003 (option order); 2004–2005 (supplemental order)	In service
R143	Passenger cars	8101–8200 (primary order); 8201–8312 (option order)	Kawasaki	1998	2001–2003	In service
R144	Funding for heavy shop equipment			1998	Funding only	
R145	R72 overhaul program			1998		Complete
R146	Model HS-RSRS snowthrower cars	ST101–ST102, ST201–ST202	RPM Tech	1999	2003	Active
R148	Ballast tamping cars	TP236–TP239	Plasser	1999	2003	In service
R149	Overhaul 9 crane cars			1999		Cancelled
R152	Track geometry cars	TGC3–TGC4	Plasser	2004, 2006	2005–2006	In service
R153	Funding for R161 conversion program			1999	Order only	
R155	Same as R102 & R113					
R156	Model MP8AC-3 diesel-electric locomotives	L912–L939	MotivePower	2006	2012–2013	In service
R157	Flat cars (16 for continuous welded rail to replace remaining R123s)	F640–F677, ACR01–ACR08, BCR01–BCR08	Kawasaki	2001	2008–2009	In service
R159	Same as R71					
R160A	Passenger cars	8313–8652, 9943–9974 (4 car sets); 8653–8712 & 9233–9802 (5 car sets)	Alstom	2003	2005–2010	In service
R160B	Passenger cars	8713–9232, 9803–9942	Kawasaki	2003	2005–2010	In service
R161	Rider cars (passenger car conversions)	RD400–RD441	MTA (in-house)	January 2000		In service
R162	Crane cars (1 ton)	C281–C292	Harsco Track Technologies		2008	In service
R164	Funding for R188 option cars			2008	Funding only	
R169	Procuring for 2 AC dynamometers			2008	Funding only	
R170	3 overhead cranes			2009		
R172	Model PBR-550T ballast regulator cars	BR004–BR005	Plasser	2009	2013	In service
R174	Same as R156 (19 locomotives)					
R175	Replace shop equipment			2009		Complete
R177	Funding for third vacuum train (pre-design phase)			2010	Funding only	
R179	Passenger cars	3010–3327	Bombardier Transportation	2008	2016–2019	In service
R181	207th Street Overhaul Shop cranes & equipment			2010–2014 Capital Program		
R182	AC/DC Traction Motor Dynamometers			2010–2014 Capital Program		
R188	Passenger cars	7211–7590 (conversions); 7811–7898 (new sets); 7899–7936 (new "C" cars)	Kawasaki	2008	2010–2016	In service
R190	Model HS-RSRS snowthrower cars	ST301–ST308	RPM Tech		2013	In service
R192	Shop equipment replacement			2013	TBD	Under planning
R193	Shop equipment replacement			2017	TBD	Under planning
R194	Shop equipment replacement			2017	TBD	Under planning

== 2020–present ==
Contract number	Details	Unit number(s)	Manufacturer	Year ordered	Year manufactured	Status
R211	Passenger cars	100–174; 3400–4499	Kawasaki Rail Car Corp.	2011	2021–present	In service
R251	Unpowered vacuum trains	VT301–VT303, VT401–VT403, VT501–VT503	Socofer/Neu Transf'Air	2015	2018	In service
R252	Flat cars (to replace R49, R51, R72, R101, & R141 tentatively)	F801–F944	Harsco Rail	2017	2019–2021	In service
R253	3-ton crane cars (to replace R113s)	C301–C312	Arva Industries	2017	TBD	In service
R254	Refuse flat cars (to replace R58s)	(27 units)	TBD	2017	TBD	Under planning
R255	Diesel-electric locomotives	HL001–HL070	Wabtec	2020	2023–present	Under delivery
R256	Signal supply cars (to replace R74s)	(2 units)	TBD	2017	TBD	Under planning
R257	Diesel-electric locomotives (R77E conversions)	L873–L882	Cad Railway Industries	2020	2021–2026	In production
R258	Ballast tamping cars (to replace R148s)	(4 units)	TBD	TBD	TBD	Under planning
R259	10-ton crane cars (to replace R102s)	(9 units)	TBD	2022	TBD	Under planning
R262	Passenger cars	2,390 cars (1,140 to retire R62/R62As, 1,250 to retire R142/R142As)	TBD	TBD	TBD	Under planning
R268	Passenger cars	378 cars	Kawasaki Rail Car Corp.	TBD	TBD	Under planning

- Car types that currently have CBTC: R143, R160, R179, R188, and R211.
- Car types that will have CBTC in the future: R142, R142A, R262, and R268.
