= R1 (New York City Subway car) =

Retired class of New York City Subway car

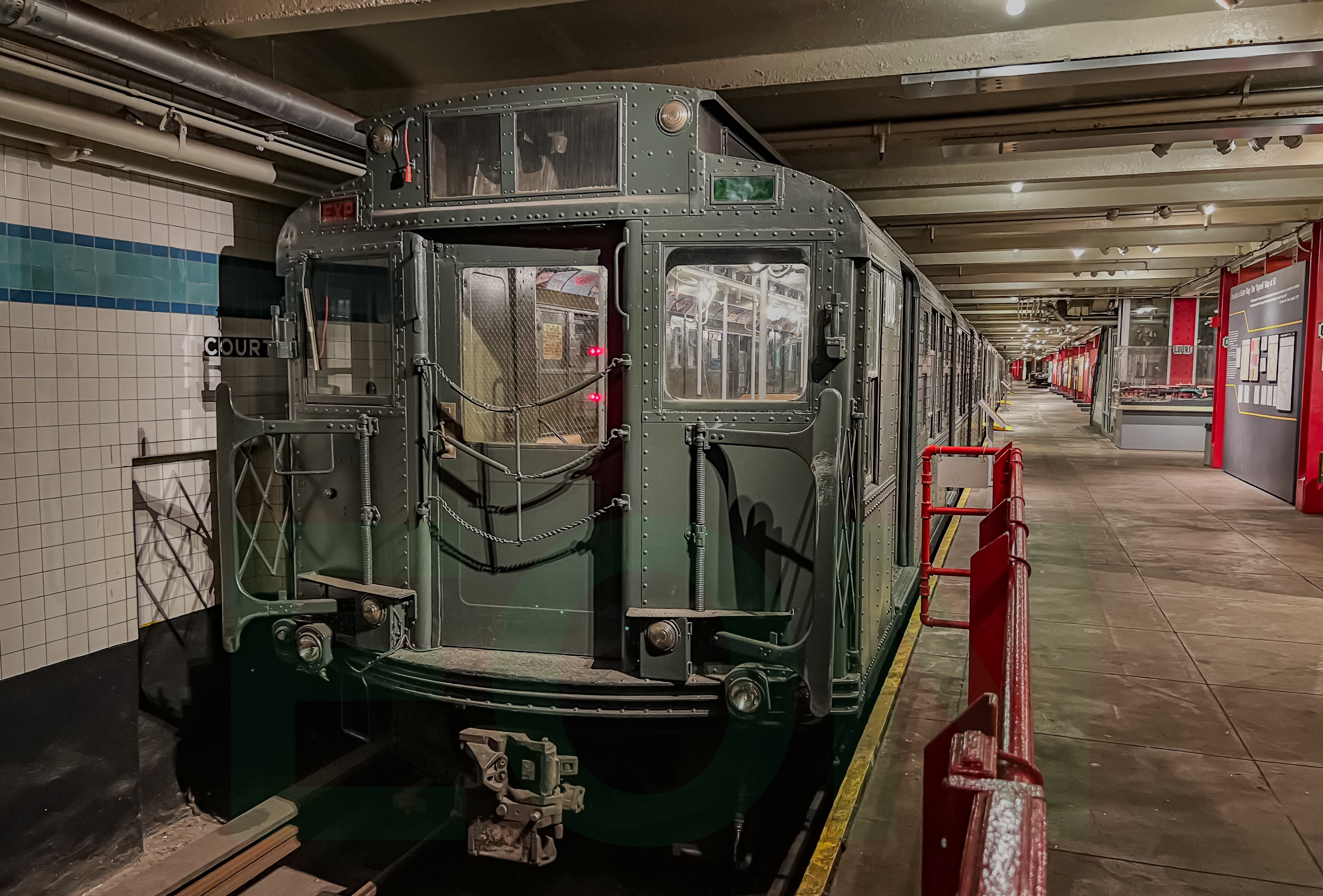
- R1 car 100 displayed at the NYTM in September 2024

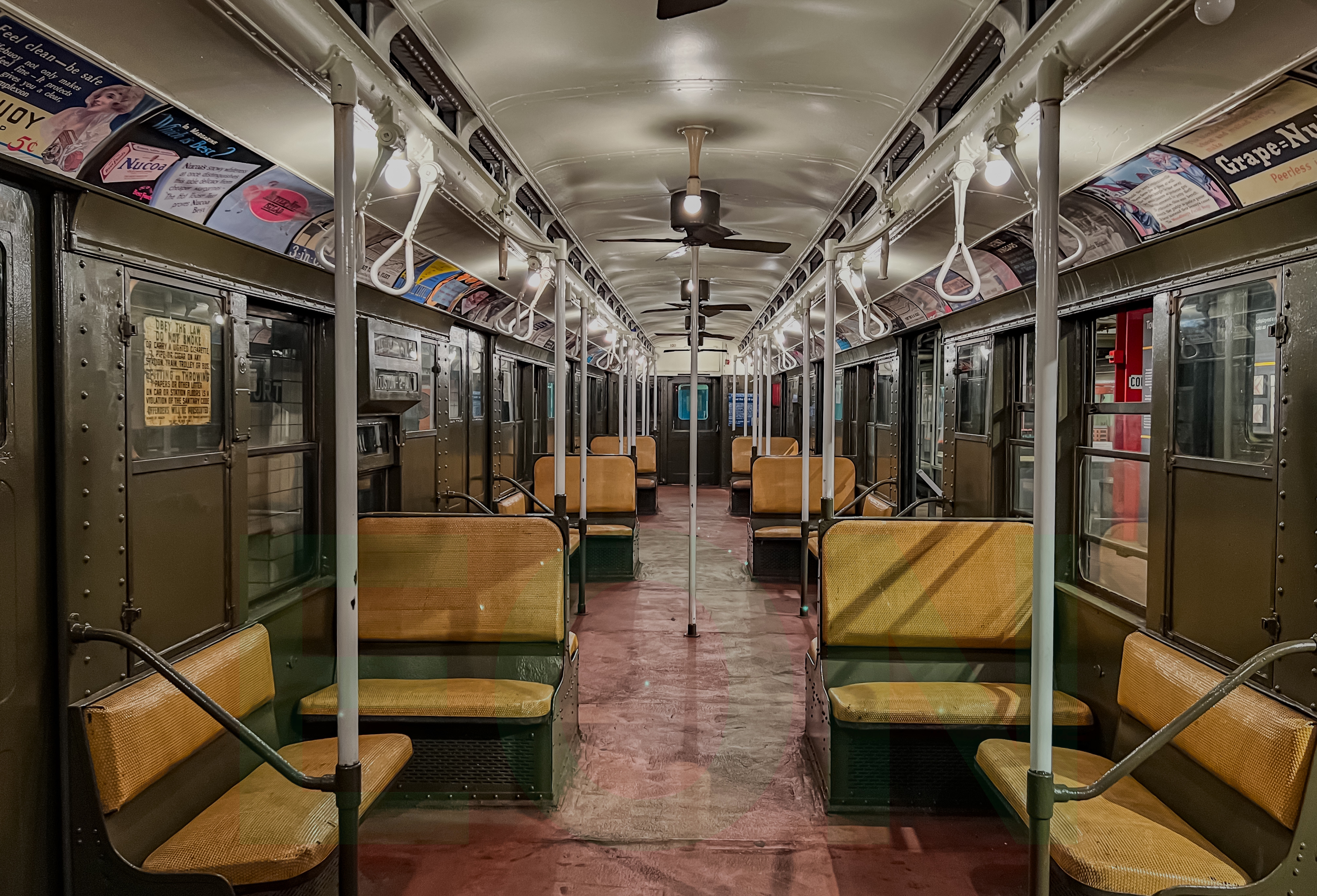
- The interior of an R1 car
- In service: July 8, 1931 – December 1, 1976 (45 years)
- Manufacturer: American Car and Foundry Company
- Built at: Berwick, Pennsylvania
- Family name: R1–9s
- Constructed: 1930–1931
- Scrapped: 1968–1977
- Number built: 300
- Number preserved: 4
- Number scrapped: 296
- Successor: R40; R42; R44; R46
- Formation: Motorized single units (Half-width operator's cab at each end; conductor controls on exterior)
- Fleet numbers: 100–399
- Capacity: 56 seats
- Operators: Independent Subway System; NYC Board of Transportation; New York City Transit Authority

Specifications
- Car body construction: Riveted steel
- Car length: 60 ft 6 in (18.44 m)
- Width: 10 ft 0 in (3.05 m)
- Height: 12 ft 1.9375 in (3.71 m)
- Floor height: 3 ft 1.875 in (0.96 m)
- Doors: 8 sets of 45 inch wide side doors per car
- Maximum speed: 55 mph (89 km/h)
- Weight: 84,081 lb (38,139 kg)
- Traction system: Westinghouse ABF type UP143B switch group, with XM-29 master controller using Westinghouse 570 D-5 traction motors (190 hp each). Two motors per car (both on motor truck, trailer truck not motorized).
- Power output: 190 hp (142 kW) per traction motor
- Acceleration: 1.75 mph/s (2.82 km/(h⋅s))
- Deceleration: ~ 3 mph/s
- Electric system: 600 V DC Third rail
- Current collection: Contact shoe (Top running)
- Braking systems: WABCO Schedule AMUE with UE-5 universal valve, ME-23 brake stand, and simplex clasp brake rigging. (Air Compressor: WABCO D-3-F)
- Coupling system: WABCO H2A
- Track gauge: 4 ft 8 1/2 in (1,435 mm)

The R1 was the first New York City Subway car type built for the Independent Subway System (IND). 300 cars were manufactured between 1930 and 1931 by the American Car and Foundry Company, numbered 100 through 399, all arranged as single units. Nicknamed City Cars, the R1s were the first of five subway car classes collectively referred to as the R1–9 fleet, with future passenger stock orders – including contracts R4, R6, R7/A, and R9 – being virtually identical, with minor mechanical and cosmetic variations.

The first R1s were delivered in 1931, in anticipation for the opening of the IND Eighth Avenue Line. For their time, the R1s introduced several improvements to subway car design that greatly sped up the flow of passengers in and out of trains. The R40s, R42s, R44s, and R46s gradually replaced the fleet of R1s, with the final run taking place in 1976. Several R1 cars were saved for preservation, while the rest were scrapped.

== Description ==
The R1s were numbered 100–399. They were the first "R" type contract order (referring to the practice of naming a car class by the letter "R" – which stands for rolling stock – followed by a number derived from the actual contract number). Future orders of subway cars, including those built for the A Division, would follow the R contract. The R2 contract order was for trucks and motors for the R1 fleet. In 1930, each new car cost $39,201: $30,483 for the car body under contract R1, and $8,718 for trucks and motors under contract R2.

== History ==
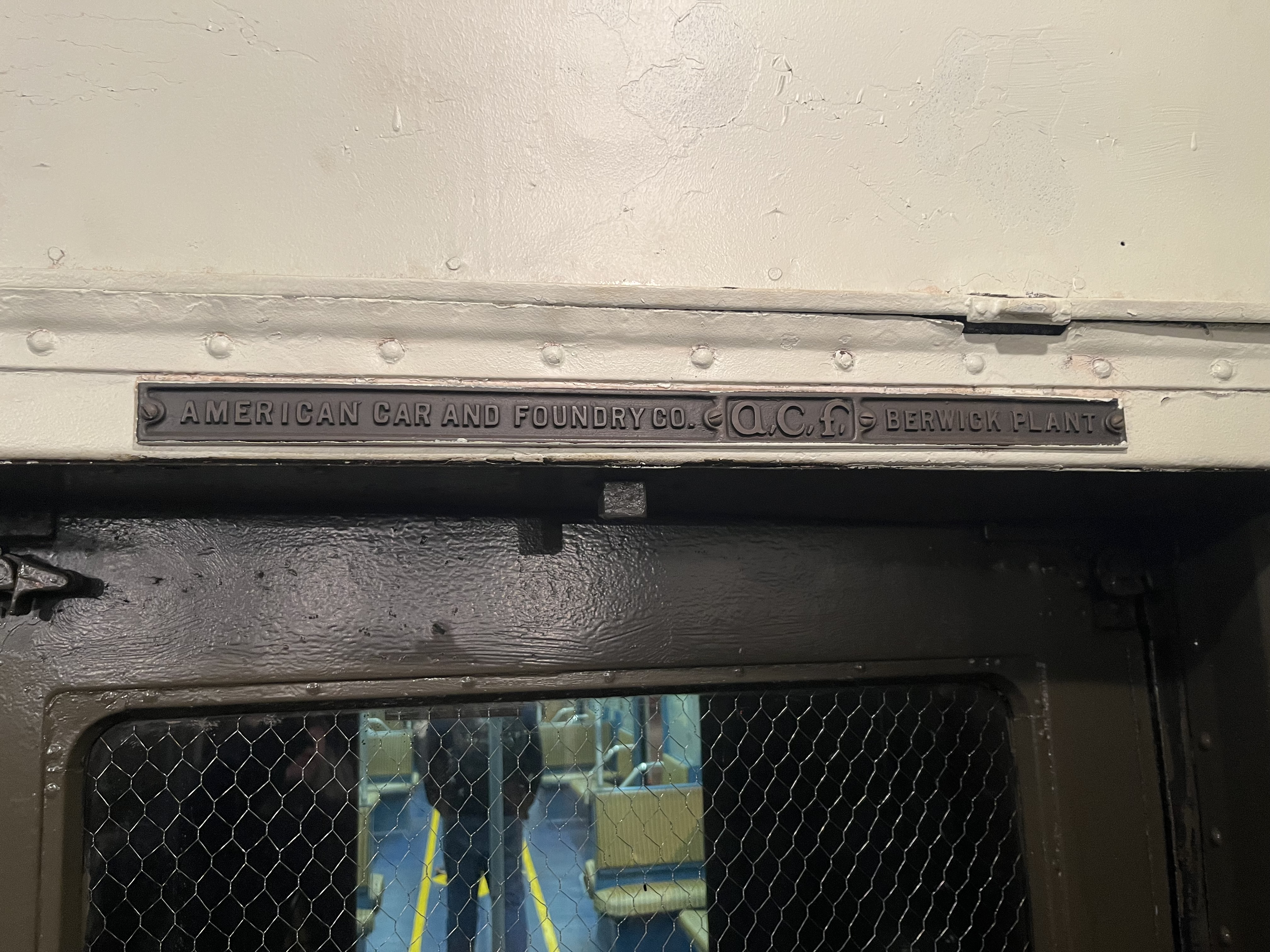
Builders plate of the R1 car 100

The first R1 cars to see passenger service were twenty individual cars to serve for two eight-car trains plus spares that were placed in revenue service on the BMT Sea Beach Line from July 8 to November 1931 for testing and then returned to the IND the same year. The BMT was to have been paid by the City of New York for the testing, but since the trains were well used in passenger service, the BMT and City called it even.

The cars were ordered so that the new Eighth Avenue Line subway could be operated.

In 1949, when all of the R10 cars were delivered and placed in service on the A, some of the R1 cars were transferred to the Coney Island Yard to relieve a car shortage on the BMT Southern Division, as well as to provide fleet for the conversion of the Astoria Line to exclusive BMT operation in fall 1949. The fleet was expanded by stages and reached 140 cars by 1953. They were used for service on the BMT 2 (now R) Broadway–4th Avenue Local service. However, despite ostensibly relieving a car shortage on the BMT, through subway service in rush hours to Coney Island did not occur on the BMT West End Line until December 1953, and on the BMT Culver Line until October 1954, when that line became part of the IND Culver Line. Upon delivery of the R16 cars in 1954–1955, the cars were returned to the IND Division.

=== Retirement ===
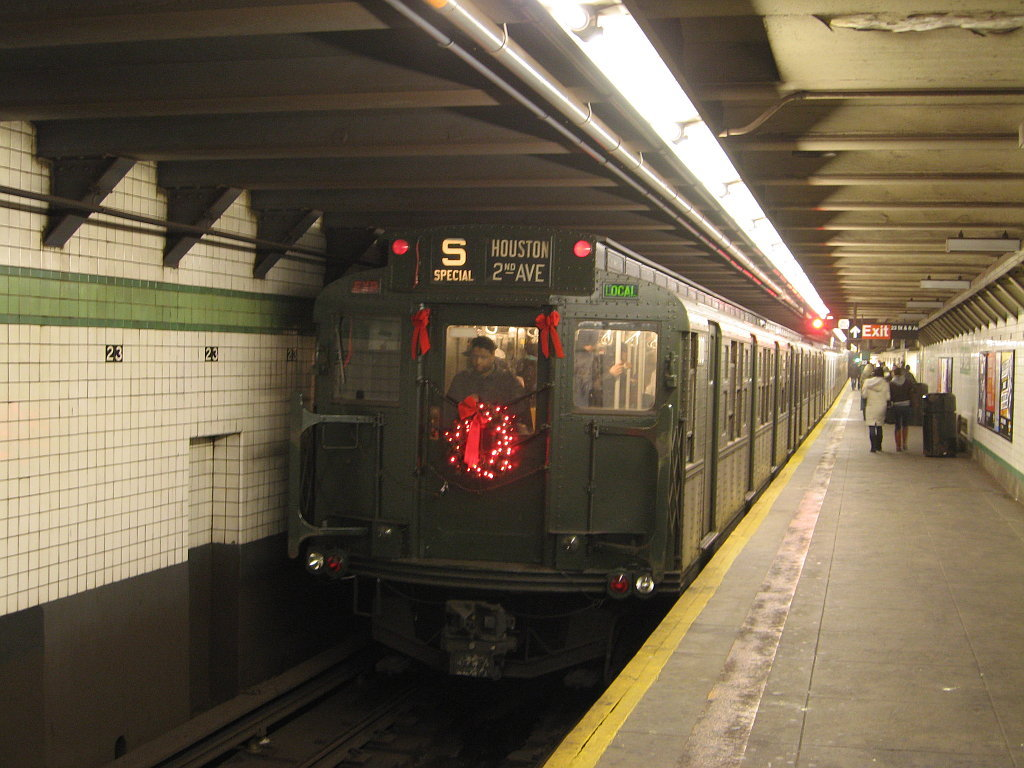
R1 car 100 at 23rd Street on the Holiday Shopper's Special in 2007

Most R1s were retired from 1968 to 1970 as age decayed the cars' internal components, causing the cars to perform worse than their newer contemporaries. Some were replaced by the R40s while many more were replaced by the R42s, but some remained past 1970 until being retired and replaced by the R44s. However, car 369, which was renumbered to 576 on October 3, 1969 and then to 1768 on August 27, 1973, was transferred to the East New York Yard. It ran on the Eastern Division until December 1, 1976, when it was finally replaced by the R46s.

Following their removal from service, the majority of the fleet was scrapped. A small number of cars remained in work service and were used until the 1980s. Several other cars have been preserved and remain today, including:

- 100 – preserved by the New York Transit Museum and restored. It is the first car of the R1–9 fleet, numerically.
- 103 – preserved by Railway Preservation Corp. and restored. This car was retrofitted with axiflow-type fans in the 1940s.
- 381 – preserved by Railway Preservation Corp. and restored.

Car 175 is at the Seashore Trolley Museum, but is used only for storage and as a source of spare parts. It does not have trucks, and two of its side doors were donated to R4 401, which has been preserved by Railway Preservation Corp. and restored.
