= R1–9 fleet =

Retired classes of New York City Subway car

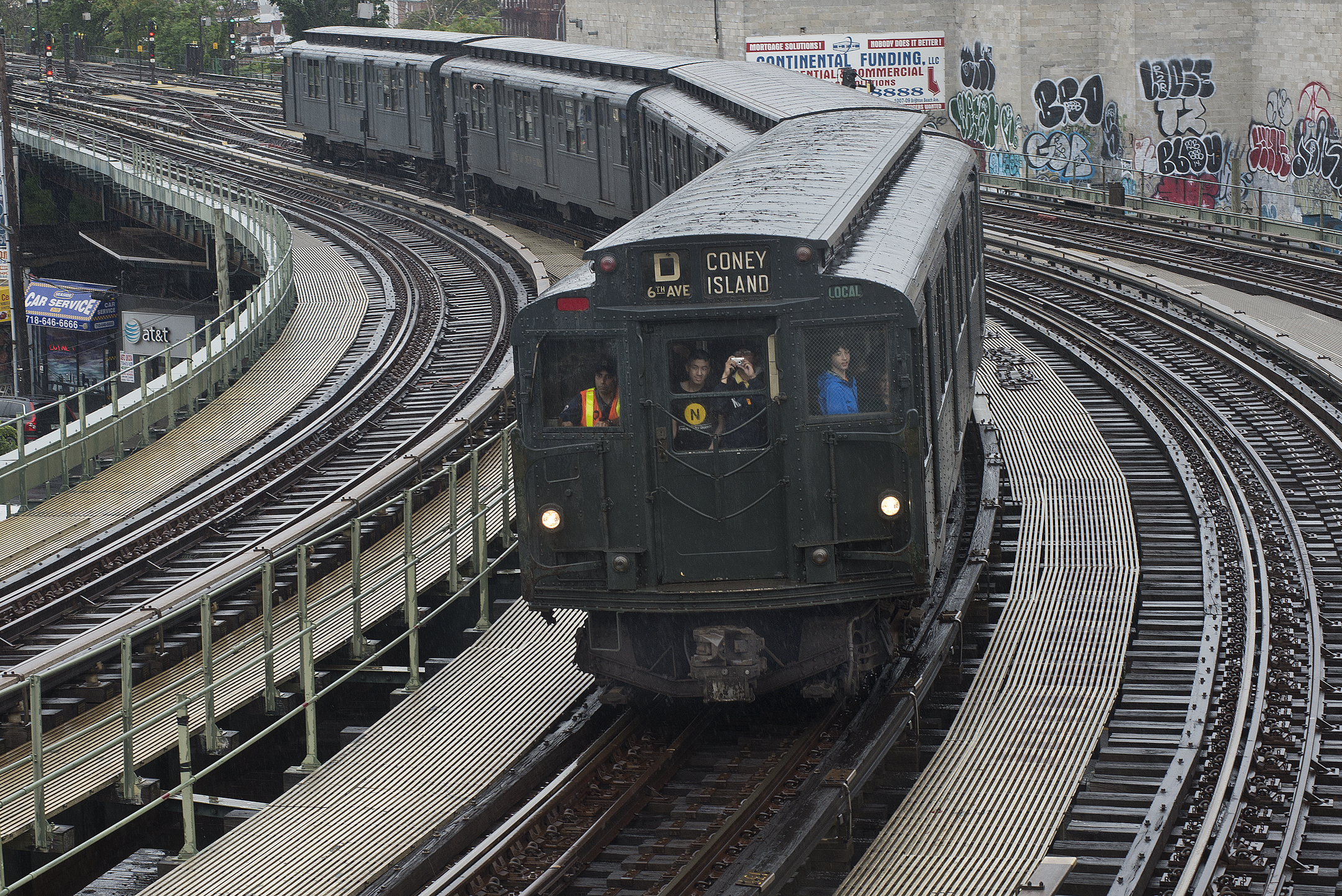
A New York Transit Museum set of R1–9s on an excursion trip

The R1–9s (colloquially known as Arnines) were the 1,703 similar New York City Subway cars built between 1930 and 1940 for the Independent Subway System. All were built by the American Car and Foundry Company, the Pressed Steel Car Company, and Pullman Standard. The name "Arnines" comes from the literal spelling out of the final contract under which these 1,703 cars were ordered – contract "R9".

The complete listing of contract numbers for cars in this group include: R1, R4, R6, R7/A, and R9. Also in the R1–9 family was the R8A, which was a revenue collection car, or money train.

The R1–9s entered service between 1931 and 1940 and remained in service until they were replaced between 1968 and 1977 with R40, R42, R44, and R46 cars. The last of the cars in this broad grouping were removed from passenger service in 1977. Many pieces of memorabilia, including rollsigns and car number plates, exist today in museums and private collections.

== Preservation ==
Twenty of these cars are preserved by various museums, businesses, organizations, and private individuals.

The cars that remain on New York City Transit Authority property (and their owners) are:

- R1 100 (New York Transit Museum) – Operable
- R1 103 (Railway Preservation Corp.) – Operable
- R1 381 (Railway Preservation Corp.) – Operable
- R4 401 (Railway Preservation Corp.) – Operable
- R4 484 (New York Transit Museum) – Inoperable
- R6 923 (Railway Preservation Corp.) – Inoperable
- R6 925 (Railway Preservation Corp.) – Inoperable
- R6 1000 (Railway Preservation Corp.) – Operable
- R6 1300 (Railway Preservation Corp.) – Operable
- R7A 1575 – rebuilt to an R10 prototype in 1947 (New York Transit Museum) – Operable
- R9 1802 (Railway Preservation Corp.) – Operable

The other cars are located at the following locations:

- R1 175 is stored at the Seashore Trolley Museum. It does not have trucks, and two of its side doors were donated to R4 401.
- R4 800 is at the Seashore Trolley Museum and is in operable condition.
- R4 825 is at the Trolley Museum of New York. It is currently undergoing a cosmetic restoration and is operable.
- R6 978 was used as a dining room at Golden's Deli in the Staten Island Mall until the deli closed in January 2012. The car was later sold to a private owner in Warwick, NY. This car is truckless with part of the car sliced away.
- R6 983 was on private property in Jacksonville, FL for over 35 years, after being purchased from the scrapyard in 1975 for use as a sidefront in a disco. It was purchased by the Craggy Mountain Line based in Asheville, NC in early 2013 and has been restored to operating service for their museum. The car uses trucks from scrapped R32s.
- R6 1144 is used as a cafeteria at the Buckinghamshire Railway Centre, England. This car has no trucks.
- R7 1440 is at the Seashore Trolley Museum and is in operable condition.
- R9 1689 is at the Shore Line Trolley Museum and is in operable condition.
- R9 1801 is at the New York State Museum, used as a static exhibit in the museum's Metropolis Hall.
