= R-7A =

R-7A, R7A or variant may refer to:

- R-7A Semyorka, Soviet ICBM
- R7A (New York City Subway car)
- R7A Canadian postal code, see List of R postal codes of Canada
- Route 7A, see Route 7
