= Sundberg-Ferar =

Industrial design company in Michigan

Sundberg-Ferar, Inc.
- Type: Private
- Founded: 1934
- Headquarters: Walled Lake, Michigan, United States
- Key people: Grey Parker, Principal, CEO, Dir. of Engineering David Thimm, Principal, Dir. of Design Jeevak Badve, Principal, Dir. of Strategic Growth
- Website: https://www.sundbergferar.com/

Sundberg-Ferar is an industrial design consultancy headquartered in Walled Lake, Michigan. Founded in 1934 by partners Carl Sundberg (1910–1982) and Montgomery Ferar (1910–1982), the company was among the first industrial design firms to be established in the U.S.

Sundberg-Ferar employs approximately 20 employees in the disciplines of industrial design, mechanical engineering, research, model making and prototyping, interaction design and packaging design. The firm has designed products for hundreds of clients in categories such as home appliances and housewares, automotive and medical products, consumer electronics, industrial equipment, mass transit vehicles, vending machines and aircraft interiors.

== Company history ==
In 1934, founders Sundberg and Ferar were working together at the General Motors Art & Color Section under Harley J. Earl when they decided to leave and start their own firm. They remained partners and owners of Sundberg-Ferar until 1975, when they retired from the firm. Company ownership has transitioned internally ever since.

Originally located in Detroit, Michigan, Sundberg-Ferar became one of the leading independent design offices after World War II. The firm also pioneered the use of design to create corporate image, coordinating a look for IBM's early computers and showrooms in the 1950s.

Company headquarters moved from Detroit to Royal Oak, Michigan and then to Southfield, Michigan in 1959. In 1995, the company moved to its current location in Walled Lake, Michigan where it operates within a 15,000 sq. ft. purpose-built structure. The building is divided into an 8,000 sq. ft. prototype shop and a 7,000 sq. ft. multi-disciplinary office space that includes a large focus group/viewing facility.

During the 1990s, the company opened offices in Atlanta, Minneapolis and Chicago, but closed these offices in a restructuring effort in 2002–2004.

In addition to Montgomery ("Monte") Ferar and Carl Sundberg, many noteworthy U.S. industrial designers of the 20th century at one time worked at Sundberg-Ferar, including Carl "Cam" Cameron, Samuel M. Highberger, Norman J. James and Clair Samhammer.

At its 2016 International Conference in Detroit, Michigan, the Industrial Designers Society of America (IDSA) awarded Carl and Monte the "Personal Recognition Award" for their contribution to industrial design's long-term welfare and importance.

== Project history ==
Some of Sundberg-Ferar's projects include Hyundai’s walking car concept, ‘Elevate’, unveiled at CES 2019, SproutsIO: a start-up product. Affinity Tool Works’ ‘Speedhorse’: the world’s fastest deployable sawhorse.

During the 1930s-1960's, the firm's design and styling projects represented a broad range of product categories, including household goods and appliances, office and industrial equipment, automobiles, boats and furniture. Notable design work from that period included:

- Crosley Pavilion - New York World's Fair (1939)
- Crosley CC automobile (1945)
- DeVilbiss Co. air compressor (1948)
- IBM 702 computer (1954)
- IBM 305 RAMAC business computer (first disk drive and architectural character to fit office decor) (1957)
- RCA/Whirlpool "Miracle Kitchen" (1957)
- J.P. Seeburg Corporation jukebox (KD-200, L-series - 1957; Q100, Q160 and 3W100 Wall-O-Matic - 1960)
- IBM Model C electric typewriter (1959)
- Sears, Roebuck & Company Tower Capri typewriter (1961)

Beginning in the 1960s, Sundberg-Ferar became heavily involved in the design of mass transit vehicles.

- New York Metropolitan Transportation Authority R40M subway transit vehicles (Design in Steel Award 1969)
- Bay Area Rapid Transit (BART) System vehicles (designed in 1965, introduced 1972)
- Washington Metropolitan Area Transit Authority (Metro) subway vehicles (1976)
- Chicago Transit Authority (Rail) 2400 Series "L" cars (1976–1978)
- Metropolitan Atlanta Rapid Transit Authority vehicles (1980's)
- Dallas Area Rapid Transit vehicles (1985–1989)

Listed among Sundberg-Ferar's major clients since 2000 are Coca-Cola, Procter & Gamble, Carrier, Masco, Chrysler, and Electrolux.
