= R4 (New York City Subway car) =

Retired class of New York City Subway car

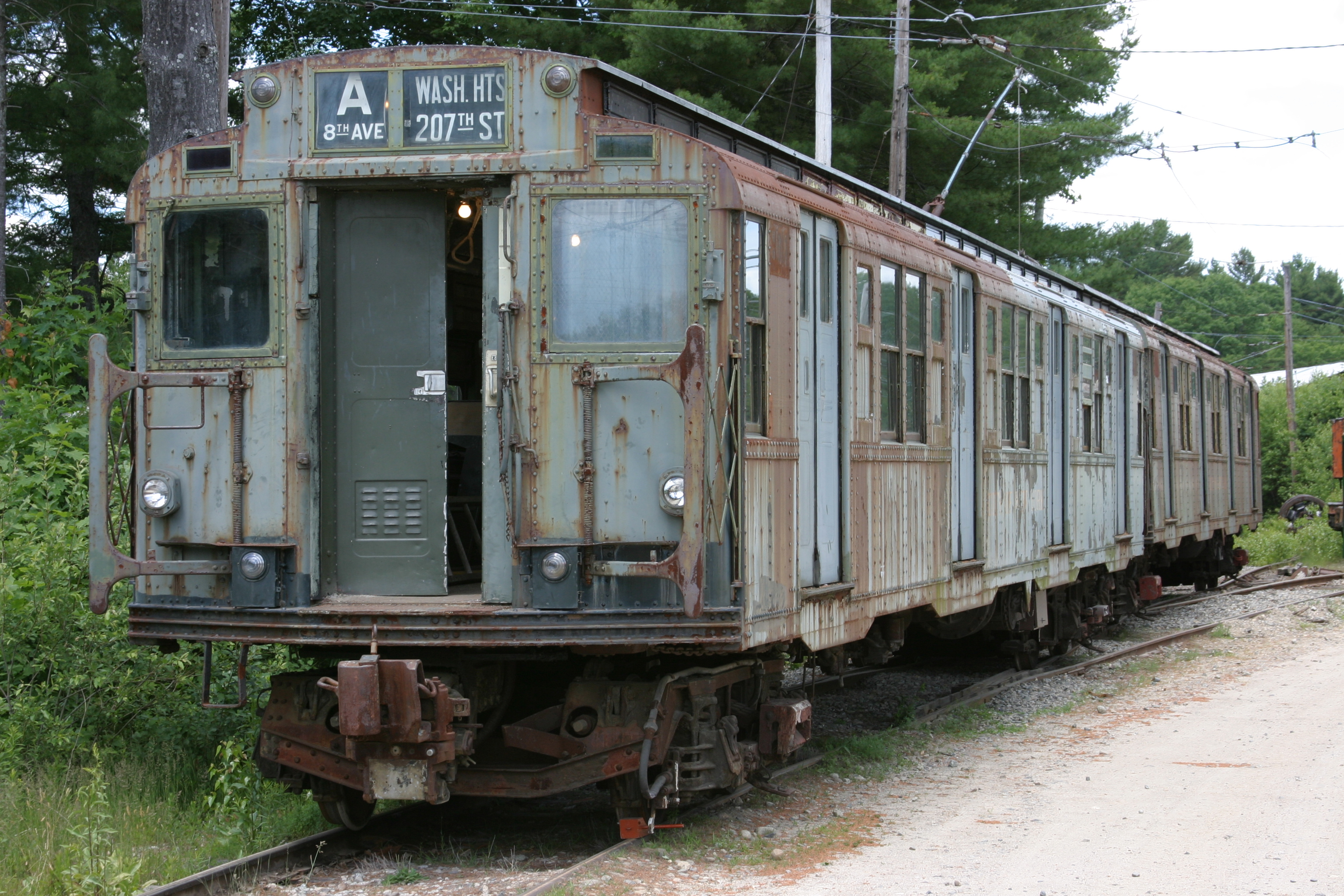
- R4 800 on display at the Seashore Trolley Museum

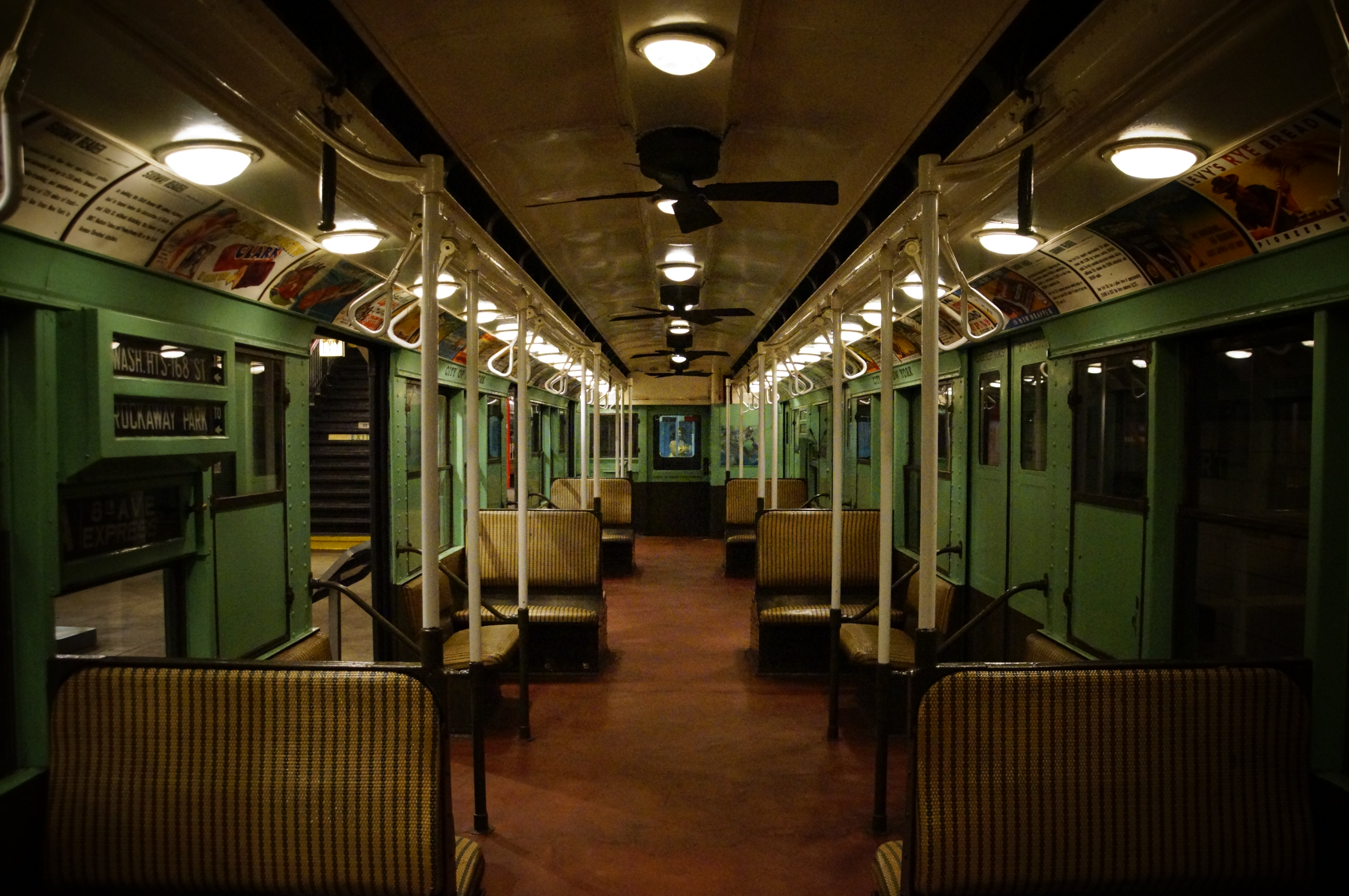
- Interior of R4 car 484 with the experimental "bullseye" lighting
- In service: 1932–1977 (45 years)
- Manufacturer: American Car and Foundry
- Family name: R1–9s
- Constructed: 1932–1933
- Scrapped: 1968–1977
- Number built: 500
- Number preserved: 4
- Number scrapped: 496
- Successor: R44 and R46
- Formation: motorized single units (Half-width operator's cab at each end; conductor controls on exterior)
- Fleet numbers: 400–899
- Capacity: 56
- Operators: Independent Subway System; NYC Board of Transportation; New York City Transit Authority

Specifications
- Car body construction: Riveted Steel
- Car length: 60 feet 2 1/2 inches (18.35 m)
- Width: 10 feet (3.05 m)
- Height: 12 feet 1 5/8 inches (3.70 m)
- Doors: 8 sets of 45 inch wide side doors per car
- Maximum speed: 55 mph (89 km/h)
- Weight: 84,503 lb (38,330 kg)
- Traction system: General Electric (GE) 714 A-1, A-2 DC Motors (2 per motor truck)
- Power output: 190 hp (142 kW) per traction motor
- Acceleration: 1.75 mph/s (2.82 km/(h⋅s))
- Electric systems: 600 V DC third rail
- Current collection: Contact shoe (Top running)
- Braking systems: WABCO Schedule AMUE with UE-5 universal valve, ME-23 brake stand, and simplex clasp brake rigging
- Coupling system: WABCO H2A
- Track gauge: 4 ft 8 1/2 in (1,435 mm)

The R4 was a New York City Subway car model built from 1932 to 1933 by the American Car and Foundry Company in Berwick, Pennsylvania. These subway cars were purchased for the IND Division. A total of 500 R4s were built, numbered 400–899, and arranged as single units. They were practically identical to the R1s, which preceded them, except that the R4s had a slightly different side door panel than the R1, adding small handle notches below the door window.

The R4s were used primarily for increased service in Queens, the Bronx, and Brooklyn. They served exclusively on all IND lines for most of their service lives, but were also used on the BMT Division during their final years. The R44s and R46s replaced the R4 cars, and they made their final runs in 1977. Four cars were preserved, and the rest were scrapped.

== History ==
ACF built these cars between 1932 and 1933. The 500 R4s were numbered 400–899 to continue the R1's sequence of numbers. The R5 contract order was for trucks and motors for the R4 fleet. In 1932, each new car cost $30,633 for the car body under contract R4.

The contract of subway cars was ordered to equip extensions of the IND in Queens, the Bronx, and Brooklyn. The R4s were used for service on the IND exclusively until 1972 or 1973.

Most R4s were retired between 1972 and 1973 as age decayed the cars' internal components, causing the cars to perform worse than their newer contemporaries. Many were replaced by the R44s. Other cars were salvaged and renumbered with number plates taken from retired R6, R7/A, and R9 cars and transferred to the East New York Yard. They ran on the Eastern Division until 1977, when they were finally replaced by the R46s. The last remaining R4, car 722 (renumbered 1398), made its final trip on the J on March 31, 1977, along with three R7/As and four R9s, marking the end of the R1–9 fleet.

=== Experimental Refits ===
- In 1946, 744 and 484 were outfitted with "bullseye" lighting and an experimental PA system.
- In 1962, 467 became the first of the first-generation IND subway cars to be retrofitted with sealed beam headlights.

== Preservation ==
Most of the cars were scrapped after retirement. However, four examples have been preserved:

- Car 401 has been preserved by Railway Preservation Corp. and restored. This car contains two side doors that were previously used on R1 car 175, which lack the small handle notches below the door window.
- Car 484 has been preserved by the New York Transit Museum and restored. This car was one of the two cars that were outfitted with "bullseye" lighting and an experimental PA system.
- Car 800 has been preserved by the Seashore Trolley Museum in Kennebunkport, Maine. The car is modified with trolley poles and used in various trips at their museum, often coupled to R7 car 1440.
- Car 825 has been preserved at the Trolley Museum of New York in Kingston, New York. It is currently undergoing a full cosmetic restoration with a planned completion date for April 2019.
