= R7 (New York City Subway car) =

Retired class of New York City Subway car

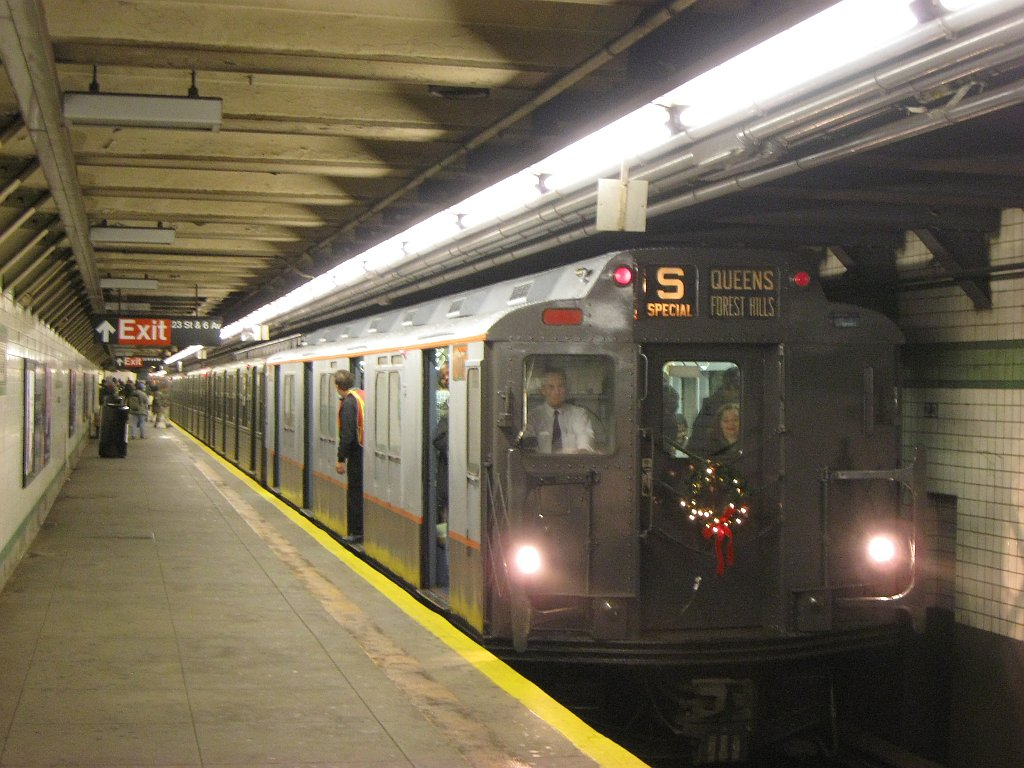
- R7A car 1575 at 23rd Street on the Holiday Shopper's Special

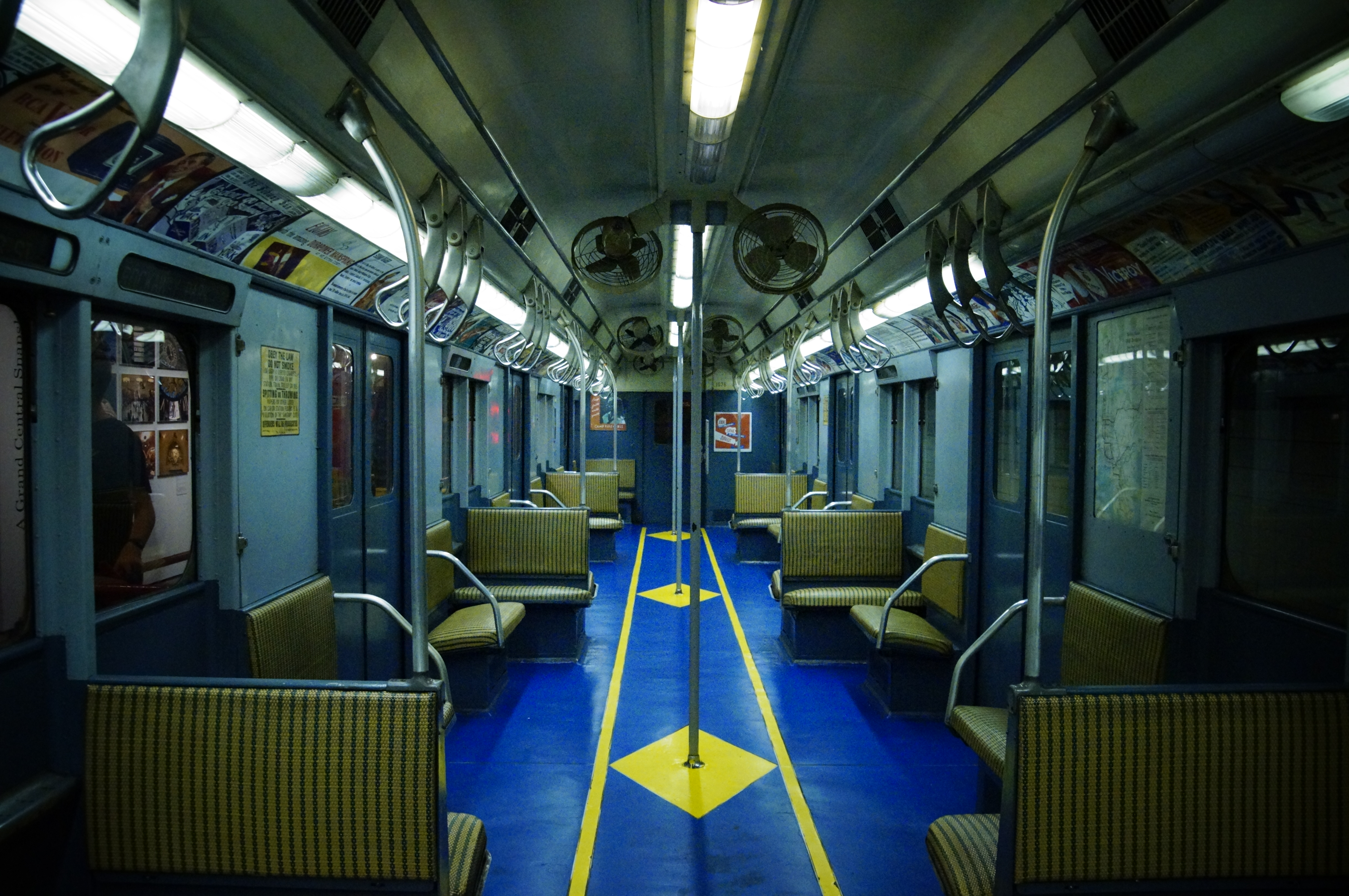
- Interior of R7A car 1575
- In service: 1938–1977 (39 years)
- Manufacturers: American Car and Foundry, Pullman Standard
- Built at: Chicago, Illinois, USA
- Family name: R1–9s
- Constructed: R7: 1937; R7A: 1938
- Entered service: 1938–1939
- Scrapped: 1969–1977
- Number built: 250: 150 R7s; 100 R7As
- Number preserved: 2 (1 R7, 1 R7A)
- Number scrapped: 248 (149 R7s, 99 R7As)
- Successor: R44 and R46
- Formation: motorized single units (Half-width operator's cab at each end; conductor controls on exterior)
- Fleet numbers: R7: 1400–1549; R7A: 1550–1599 (Built by Pullman Standard) 1600–1649 (Built by American Car Foundry)
- Capacity: 56 (seated)
- Operators: Independent Subway System; NYC Board of Transportation; New York City Subway

Specifications
- Car body construction: Riveted steel
- Car length: 60 feet 2 1/2 inches (18.35 m) over anticlimbers
- Width: 10 ft (3.05 m)
- Height: 12 feet 1 5/8 inches (3.70 m)
- Platform height: 3.76 ft (1.15 m)
- Doors: 8 sets of 45 inch wide side doors per car
- Maximum speed: 55 mph (89 km/h)
- Weight: 84,556 lb (38,354 kg) (ACF), 84,750 lb (38,440 kg) (Pullman), #1575: 82,340 lb (37,350 kg)
- Traction system: Westinghouse 570-D5 or General Electric 714-D1, 714-D2
- Power output: 190 hp (142 kW)
- Electric system: 600 V DC Third rail
- Current collection: Contact shoe
- Braking systems: WABCO Schedule AMUE with UE-5 universal valve, ME-23 brake stand, and simplex clasp brake rigging. WABCO D-3-F air compressor
- Coupling system: WABCO H2A
- Track gauge: 4 ft 8 1/2 in (1,435 mm)

The R7 was a New York City Subway car model built from 1937 to 1938 for the city-operated Independent Subway System by two manufacturers under separate orders, the American Car and Foundry Company and Pullman Standard. They were a continuation of the R6 fleet and closely resemble them, except that the R7/As did not include the “CITY OF NEW YORK” lettering on the middle of the car exterior. A total of 250 cars were built, all arranged as single units. Two versions were ordered: the R7, which consisted of 150 cars, numbered 1400–1549, and the R7A, which consisted of 100 cars, numbered 1550–1649.

The R7s and R7As were used primarily for increased service in Queens and the opening of the Crosstown Line. They served exclusively on all IND lines for most of their service lives, but were also used on the Eastern Division of the BMT Division's J and L lines during their final years. The R44s and R46s replaced the R7 cars, and they made their final runs in 1977. Two cars, one R7 and one R7A, have been preserved, while the rest of the fleet was scrapped.

== History ==
On March 5, 1937, the New York City Board of Transportation opened up bids for 150 cars to be built under the R7 contract. The winning bid for $40,375 per car was jointly submitted by the American Car and Foundry Company (ACF) and Pullman Standard. The Pressed Steel Car Company also submitted a bid, for $40,850 per car. On July 27, 1937, it was announced that the winning bid for 100 additional cars, under contract R7A, went to ACF and Pullman for $41,951 per car. Additional bids were made by Pressed Steel ($42,200) and Bethlehem Steel ($43,100). The increase in price per car was attributed to strikes in the steel industry.

The R7s were built in 1937, and the R7As were built in 1938. They were used for service on the IND exclusively until 1968, when they began to be displaced from the IND by the new R40s and R42s and transferred to the East New York Yard.

Many R7/As were replaced by the R44s. Most other cars ran on the BMT Division's Eastern Division until 1977, when they were finally replaced by the R46s.

== Preservation ==
Following their retirement, all but two cars were scrapped. The two cars that were not scrapped have survived into preservation:

- R7 car 1440 has been preserved by the Seashore Trolley Museum in Kennebunkport, Maine. It is modified with trolley poles and was used in various tourist rides around the museum, often coupled to R4 car 800. The car is currently awaiting a full repaint.
- R7A car 1575 has been preserved by the New York Transit Museum. It was restored to operating condition and has been used in excursions sponsored by the Transit Museum since 2003. During its service life, it was rebuilt from its original appearance by ACF in 1947 following an accident in 1946, and became the prototype for the R10. It was designed to test new interior and cosmetic features. While it cosmetically resembles an R10, mechanically and electrically, it is still an R7A and can only operate with the rest of the pre-war R1–9 fleet.
