= R8A (New York City Subway car) =

Retired class of New York City Subway car

- R8A 66 at the 207th Street Yard
- In service: 1939–1970s
- Manufacturer: St. Louis Car Company
- Constructed: 1939
- Number built: 2
- Number preserved: 0
- Number scrapped: 2
- Capacity: 9
- Operators: Independent Subway System; NYC Board of Transportation; New York City Subway

Specifications
- Car length: 44 feet 7 1/2 inches (13.6 m)
- Width: 10 feet (3.05 m)
- Height: 12 feet 1 15/16 inches (3.71 m)
- Weight: 59,640 pounds (27,052 kg)
- Electric systems: 600 V DC third rail
- Current collection: Contact shoe
- Braking system: Westinghouse Air Brake Company electro-pneumatic brake
- Track gauge: 4 ft 8 1/2 in (1,435 mm)

The R8A was a class of New York City Subway fare collection cars built in 1939 by the St. Louis Car Company, and used to gather and transport money and tokens from stations along the IND division.

The New York City Board of Transportation awarded a contract to the St. Louis Car Company on October 25, 1938 for the 2 money collection cars as well as 4 trailer flat cars. The bid was for a combined price of $94,960, including $66,787 for the money collection cars. Cars 66 and 67 were the only two cars built.

Before 1951, the R8A and other money cars brought the money to stations near the New York City Board of Transportation headquarters, which was located at 250 Hudson Street. The money was then transferred via armored cars to the headquarters. In 1951, a new facility opened at 370 Jay Street in Brooklyn to handle revenue from the money cars. 370 Jay Street provided direct connection to the IND, BMT, and IRT subway lines, thus eliminating the need for using armored cars.

In their final years, the cars were renumbered twice, first as 20176 and 20177 in 1962, and again as 30176 and 30177 in 1966.

Being blind motors, the cars were usually towed around by a set of out of service R1–9 cars. 66 was last operated in 1970, after which it was removed from service, and sent to Jamaica Yard Training Services, to be used as a shed. It was removed some time before 1990 and scrapped. Car 67 was used as a school car, until it was scrapped in April 1986.
