= R9 (New York City Subway car) =

Retired class of New York City Subway car

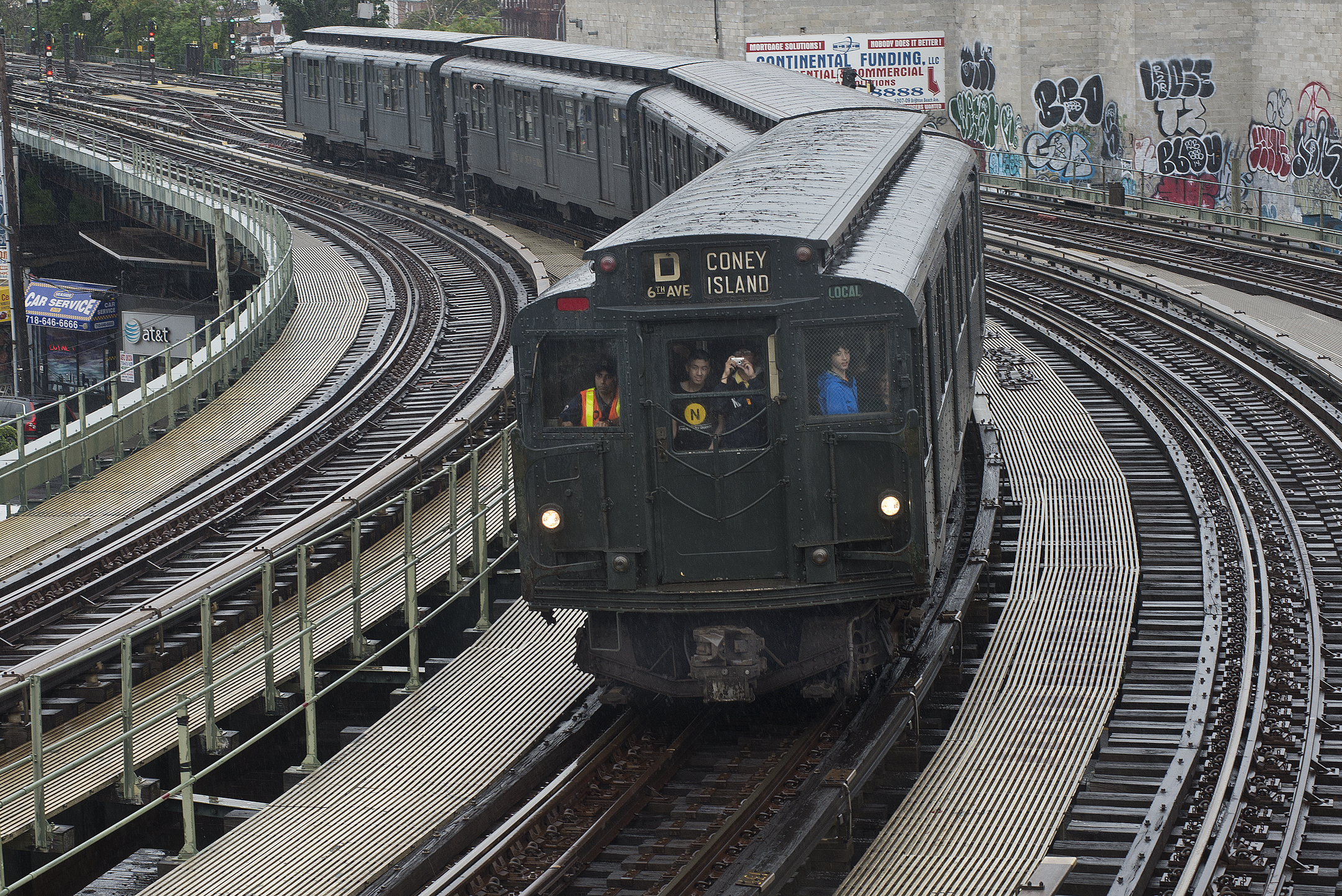
- R9 car 1802 at Brighton Beach on the BMT Brighton Line
- In service: 1940 – March 31, 1977 (37 years)
- Manufacturers: American Car and Foundry; Pressed Steel Car Company
- Built at: Chicago, Illinois, USA
- Family name: R1–9s
- Constructed: 1940
- Entered service: 1940
- Number built: 153
- Number preserved: 3
- Number scrapped: 150
- Successor: R46
- Formation: motorized single units (Half-width operator's cab at each end; conductor controls on exterior)
- Fleet numbers: 1650–1802 (motorized single units)
- Capacity: 56 (seated)
- Operators: Independent Subway System; NYC Board of Transportation; New York City Subway

Specifications
- Car body construction: Riveted steel
- Car length: 60 feet 2 1/2 inches (18.35 m)
- Width: 10 feet (3.05 m)
- Height: 12 feet 1 5/8 inches (3.70 m)
- Platform height: 3.76 ft (1.15 m)
- Doors: 8 sets of 45 inch wide side doors per car
- Maximum speed: 55 mph (89 km/h)
- Weight: ~ 84,575.5 lb (38,362.8 kg)
- Traction system: Westinghouse 570-D5 or General Electric 714-D4, 714-D5
- Power output: 190 hp (142 kW)
- Electric system: 600 V DC Third rail
- Current collection: Contact shoe
- Braking systems: WABCO Schedule AMUE with UE-5 universal valve, ME-23 brake stand, and simplex clasp brake rigging. WABCO D-3-F air compressor
- Coupling system: WABCO H2A
- Headlight type: incandescent light bulbs
- Track gauge: 4 ft 8 1/2 in (1,435 mm)

The R9 was a New York City Subway car model, which was built by the American Car and Foundry Company and the Pressed Steel Car Company in 1940 for the Independent Subway System (IND) and its successors, which included the New York City Board of Transportation and the New York City Transit Authority. Identical to the preceding R7/As, the R9s had distinctive curved ends on the rollsign boxes and contained distinct 2CY air compressors not featured on the older cars in the R1–9 fleet. A total of 153 cars were built, numbered 1650–1802, and arranged as single units. They were the last R1–9 type cars that were ordered before the merger of the IND with the IRT and BMT in 1940.

The R9s were ordered in preparation for the opening of the IND Sixth Avenue Line, the second IND trunk line in Manhattan to open after the IND Eighth Avenue Line. They were used primarily for increased service in Queens and the opening of the Crosstown Line. They served exclusively on all IND lines for most of their service lives, but were also used on the BMT Division during their final years. The R46s replaced the R9 cars, with the final run taking place on March 31, 1977. Three cars were preserved, while the rest were scrapped.

== History ==
A total of 153 R9 cars were ordered from two different manufacturers. Cars 1650–1701 were built by ACF, while cars 1702–1802 were built by Pressed Steel. 150 of the new cars were ordered for service on the new IND Sixth Avenue Line, which opened on December 15, 1940. The Sixth Avenue Line was the second IND Manhattan trunk line (joining the 1932 IND Eighth Avenue Line), and therefore the additional cars were needed for the new service. The remaining 3 cars, cars 1800–1802, were ordered as replacements for three older IND cars (R1 cars 212 & 378 and R4 car 472) that had been damaged beyond repair as a result of a February 17, 1936 collision on the Smith St. Line between 7th Ave. and Church Ave.

The 153 R9 cars remained the newest part of the IND fleet until the arrival of the R10 cars in 1948. The R9s were also used for service on the IND exclusively until 1968 and almost exclusively in Queens, when they were displaced by the new R40 cars. They were then transferred to the East New York Yard of the BMT Eastern Division and used on the former BMT J, KK, LL, M, and QJ routes.

=== Retirement ===
The fleet of R9 cars stayed largely intact and in service until being replaced by the R46s between 1976 and 1977, with several replaced by renumbered R4 cars in 1973. The last day of R9 cars in service was on March 31, 1977, as the cars made their final run on the J train.

Following their retirement, the majority of the cars were scrapped. However, three have been preserved:

- Car 1689 has been preserved by the Shore Line Trolley Museum in East Haven, Connecticut, and restored. The car was modified with trolley poles and is used for various tourist rides around the museum.
- Car 1801 has been preserved by the New York State Museum in Albany, New York, located in the museum's Metropolis Hall.
- Car 1802 has been preserved by Railway Preservation Corp. and restored. It is the last car of the R1–9 fleet.
