= R42 (New York City Subway car) =

Retired class of New York City Subway car

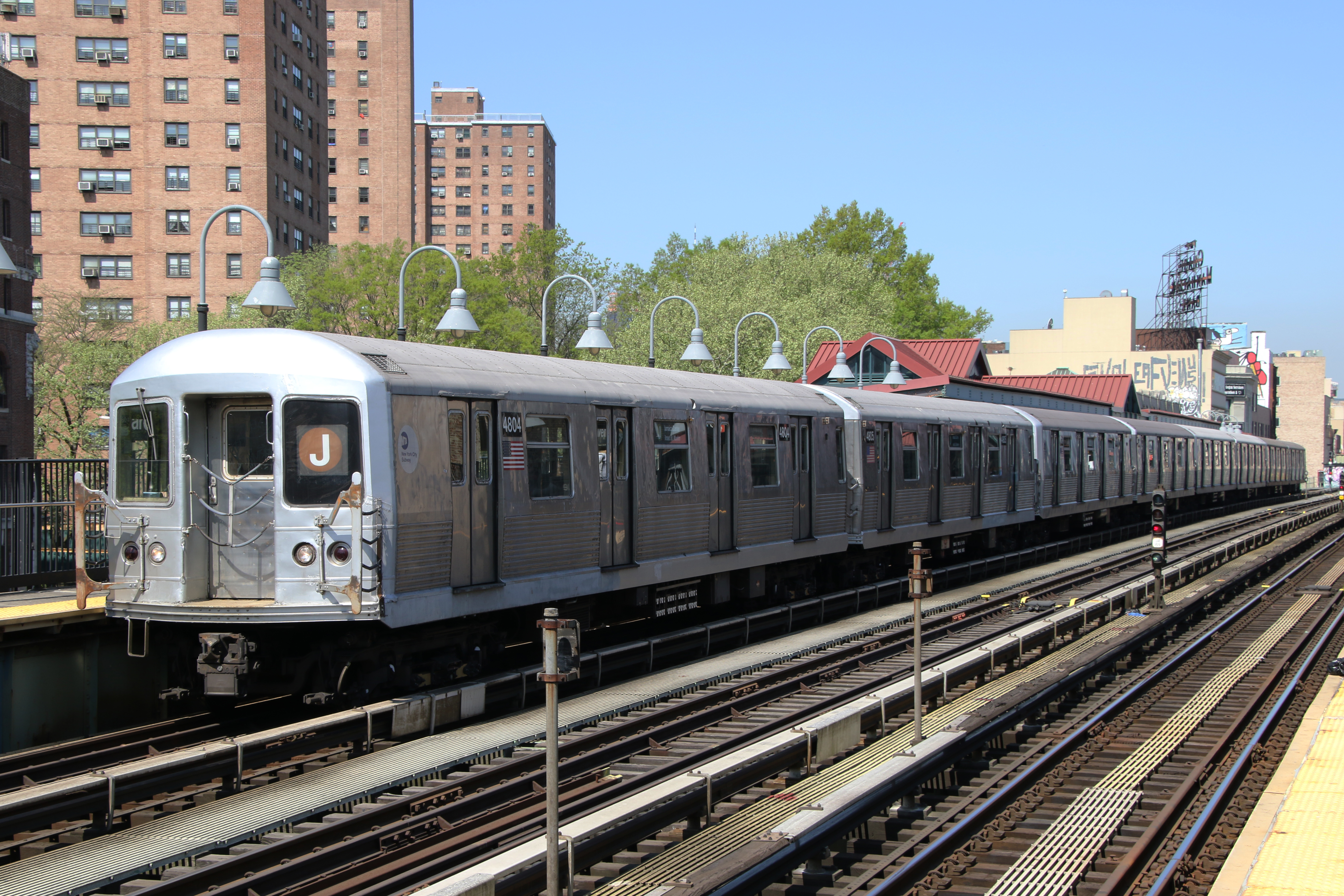
- An R42 train on the J at Marcy Avenue

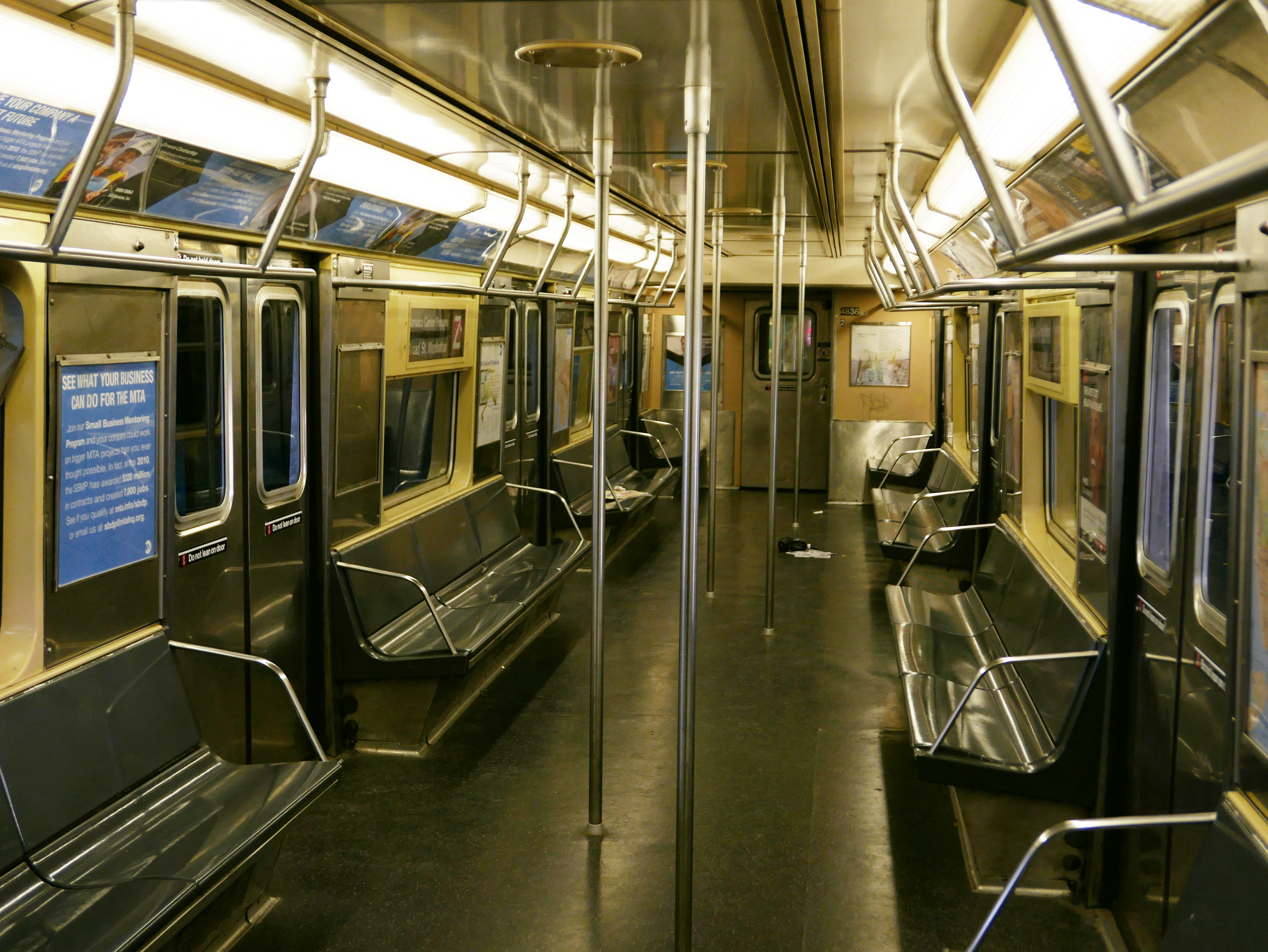
- Interior of an R42 car
- In service: May 9, 1969 – February 12, 2020 (50 years)
- Manufacturer: St. Louis Car Company
- Built at: St. Louis, Missouri, U.S.
- Replaced: All remaining BMT Standards; Many R1s
- Constructed: 1969–1970
- Entered service: May 9, 1969
- Refurbished: 1988–1989
- Scrapped: 2007–2008 (all CI-rebuilt cars); 2007–2013 (most MK-rebuilt cars)
- Number built: 400
- Number in service: (48 in work service)
- Number preserved: 5
- Number scrapped: 347
- Successor: R160 and R179
- Formation: Married Pairs
- Fleet numbers: 4550–4949
- Capacity: 44 (seated)
- Operator: New York City Subway

Specifications
- Car body construction: Stainless Steel with Carbon Steel chassis, roof and underbody, Fiberglass A-end bonnet and B-end top bonnet
- Train length: 2 car train: 120.4 feet (36.7 m); 4 car train: 240.8 feet (73.4 m); 6 car train: 361.2 feet (110.1 m); 8 car train: 481.6 feet (146.8 m); 10 car train: 602 feet (183 m)
- Car length: 60 ft (18.29 m)
- Width: 10 ft (3,048 mm)
- Height: 12.08 ft (3,682 mm)
- Platform height: 3.76 ft (1.15 m)
- Doors: 8 pairs of 50 inch wide side doors per car
- Maximum speed: 55 mph (89 km/h)
- Weight: 74,388.5 lb (33,742 kg)
- Traction system: General Electric (GE) SCM propulsion system using Westinghouse 1447J motors 115 hp (85.8 kW) on all axles
- Acceleration: 2.5 mph/s (4.0 km/(h⋅s))
- Deceleration: 3.0 mph/s (4.8 km/(h⋅s)) (Full Service); 3.2 mph/s (5.1 km/(h⋅s)) (Emergency)
- Electric systems: 600 V DC third rail
- Current collection: Contact shoe
- Braking systems: CI rebuilds: New York Air Brake SMEE / Newtran (dynamic and friction), A.S.F. simplex unit cylinder clasp (tread) brake MK rebuilds: WABCO "SMEE" Braking System, A.S.F. simplex unit cylinder clasp (tread) brake
- Safety system: tripcock
- Coupling system: Westinghouse H2C
- Headlight type: halogen light bulbs
- Track gauge: 4 ft 8 1/2 in (1,435 mm)

The R42 was a New York City Subway car model built by the St. Louis Car Company between 1969 and 1970 for the IND/BMT B Division. There were 400 cars in the R42 fleet, numbered 4550–4949. It was the last 60-foot (18.29 m) B Division car built for the New York City Subway until the R143 in 2001, and the last car model class to be built in married pairs.

The first R42 cars entered service on May 9, 1969. Various modifications were made over the years to the R42 fleet. In the late 1980s, the R42 cars were rebuilt by Morrison–Knudsen and the Coney Island Rapid Transit Car Overhaul Shop.

The R160 order was to replace all R42s in the late 2000s. However, 50 cars of the original fleet remained when it was decided to retire the NYCT R44s instead. The R179 order replaced the remainder of the R42s in the late 2010s. The R42s temporarily resumed service from January 8 through 24 in 2020 when the R179s were pulled from service. The final train of R42s ran in passenger service on February 12, 2020. After retirement, most of the R42s were sunk as artificial reefs, scrapped, or placed into storage, but a handful have been preserved and others retained for various purposes.

== Description ==
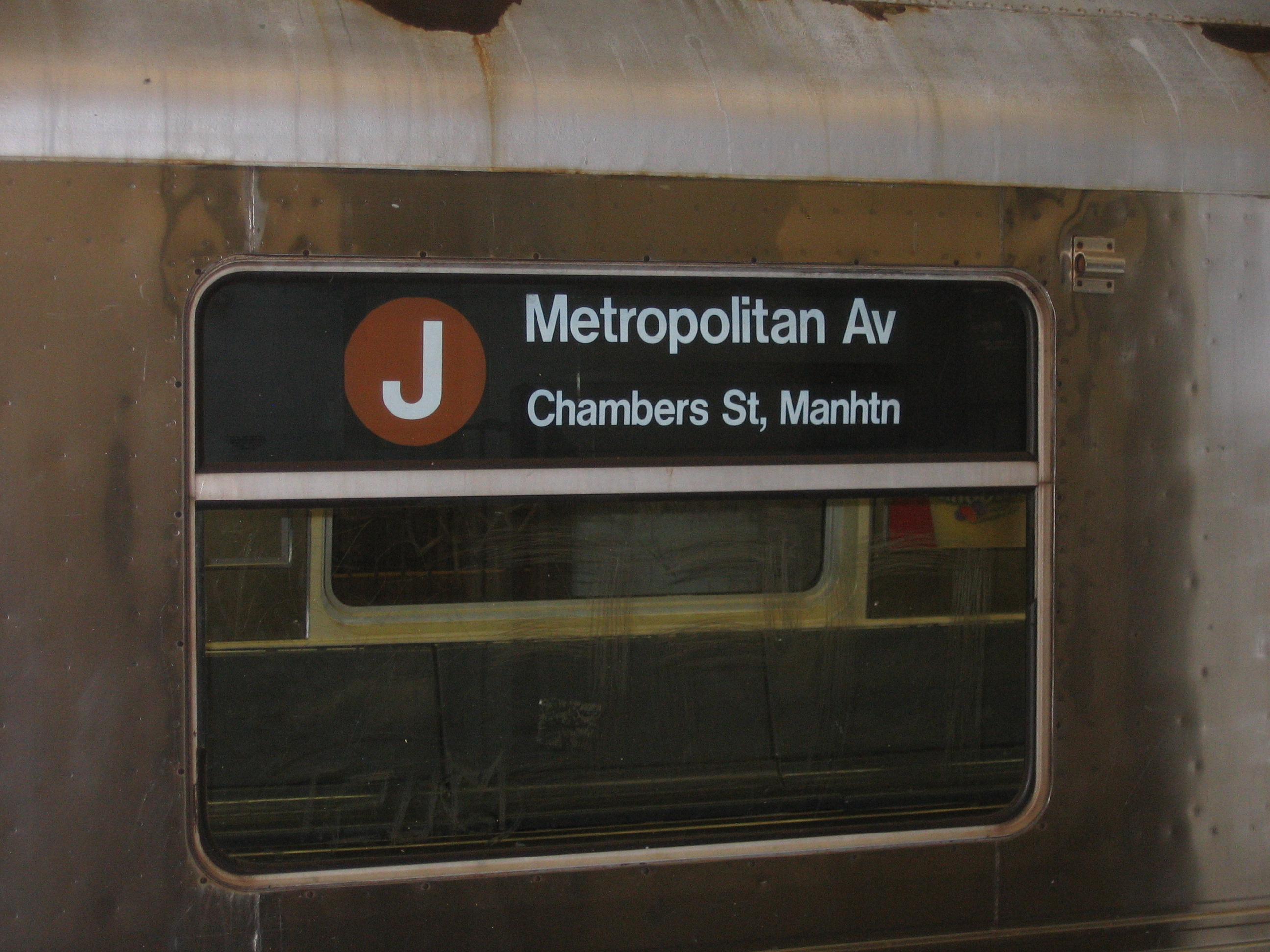
Side route and destination rollsigns of an R42

The R42s were numbered 4550–4949. They were the first fleet of New York City Subway cars to be fully equipped with Stone-Safety 10 ton air conditioning systems/units. Such units were similarly found on the last ten R38s (4140–4149) and all two-hundred R40As (4350–4549).

The R42s were also the first cars to use solid-state converters in place of the motor-generators as standard equipment. In addition, they were also the last cars to be equipped with the tried-and-true, and extremely reliable WABCO RT-2 or SMEE braking system temporarily, until returning in 1983 with the R62s for the IRT division, after disastrous results with the newer WABCO RT-5 or P-Wire braking systems used on their R44 and R46 cars of the 1970s. Notably, they were also the last cars to not have the two-note door warning chime that was present on the R44 and all of the subway car models that followed it.

As the R42s and the straight-ended R40As were nearly identical, they were often operated together in mixed-consists.

== History ==
On May 9, 1969, cars 4554–4555 entered service on the N as part of a mixed consist with straight-ended R40As. By January 5, 1970, all cars were in service.

=== Post-delivery, overhaul, and mishaps ===
Initially, the R42s suffered from air conditioning and brake malfunctions, frequently injuring crew members.

In 1973, cars 4764–4765 were sent to Garrett AiResearch's facilities in Los Angeles, California, to test out an experimental flywheel energy storage and energy-saving system and equipment. Car 4764 received this energy storage, conservation equipment, and machinery with batteries and amber-type digital readouts indicating the amount of energy used by the equipment, while 4765 remained untouched. These cars were later tested at the UMTA and the USDOT testing facility in Pueblo, Colorado for evaluation, before being returned to the MTA in 1976 for in-service testing on all BMT/IND lines to check the effectiveness of the technology.

In 1977, pantograph gates, salvaged from retired R1–9 subway cars, were modified and installed on the front ends of the R42s. "Baloney" coil spring-type intercar safety barriers were also installed on the blind ends of the married pairs.

Cars 4680–4681, 4714–4715, and 4766–4767 were all scrapped due to various incidents prior to the General Overhaul (GOH) program. In addition, cars 4685 and 4726 sustained heavy damage in an incident outside of the 135th St station on the IND Eighth Avenue Line and were scrapped in 2001; they were not rebuilt, but their mates were paired together and survived to go through the GOH program.

The R42s were rebuilt between 1988 and 1989 under the General Overhaul (GOH) program as a result of deferred maintenance in the transit system during the 1970s and 1980s. 286 cars (in the 4550–4839 range) were rebuilt off-property by Morrison–Knudsen in Hornell, New York, and all 110 cars numbered 4840–4949 were rebuilt in-house at the Coney Island Overhaul Shop in Coney Island, Brooklyn. The Coney Island rebuilds retained their original blue door indicator lights at the ends of the cars as well as their original master controllers; the indicator lights were removed by Morrison-Knudsen.

On February 5, 1995, car 4918 rear-ended R40 4259 outside of the Ninth Avenue station, which also damaged two other cars in the R42 consist (4938–4939). All three R42s were repaired and returned to service, with 4918 repaired using the front-end of 4726.

On June 6, 1995, cars 4664–4665 were involved in a collision on the Williamsburg Bridge with straight-ended R40A cars 4460–4461. Car 4664 was scrapped in 2000 (along with cars 4685 and 4726, which were not involved in the accident) and R40A 4461 was taken out of service, leaving 4665 to be mated with R40A 4460. This pair today survives as part of the museum fleet.

On November 6, 2007, an eight-car train was involved in an accident on the M when the motorman struck the bumper block south of the Chambers Street station. As the R42 fleet was being retired at the time, the entire consist was hauled to the 207th Street Yard for reefing instead of being repaired, even though only the first two cars suffered major damage.

=== Retirement ===
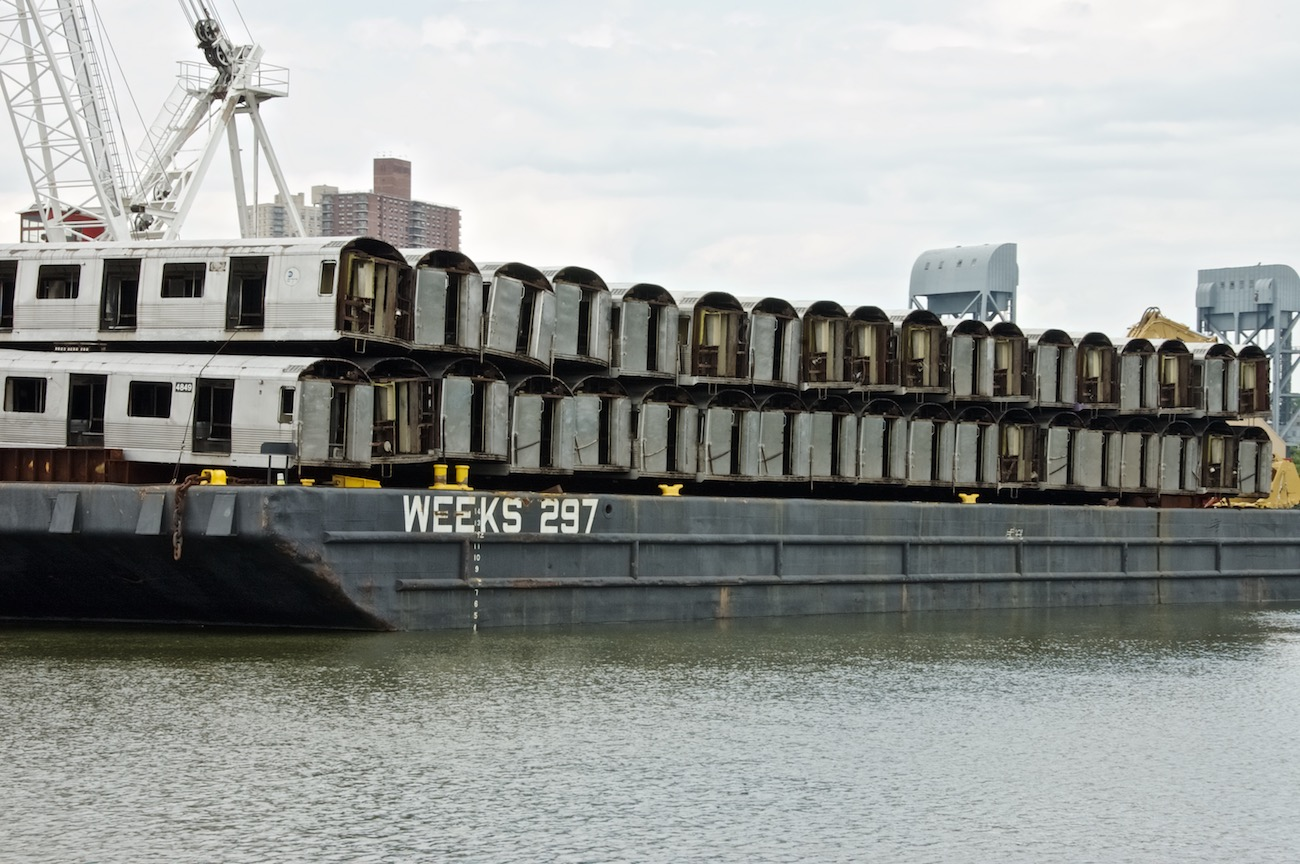
Retired R42 cars being shipped out to the Atlantic Ocean for reefing

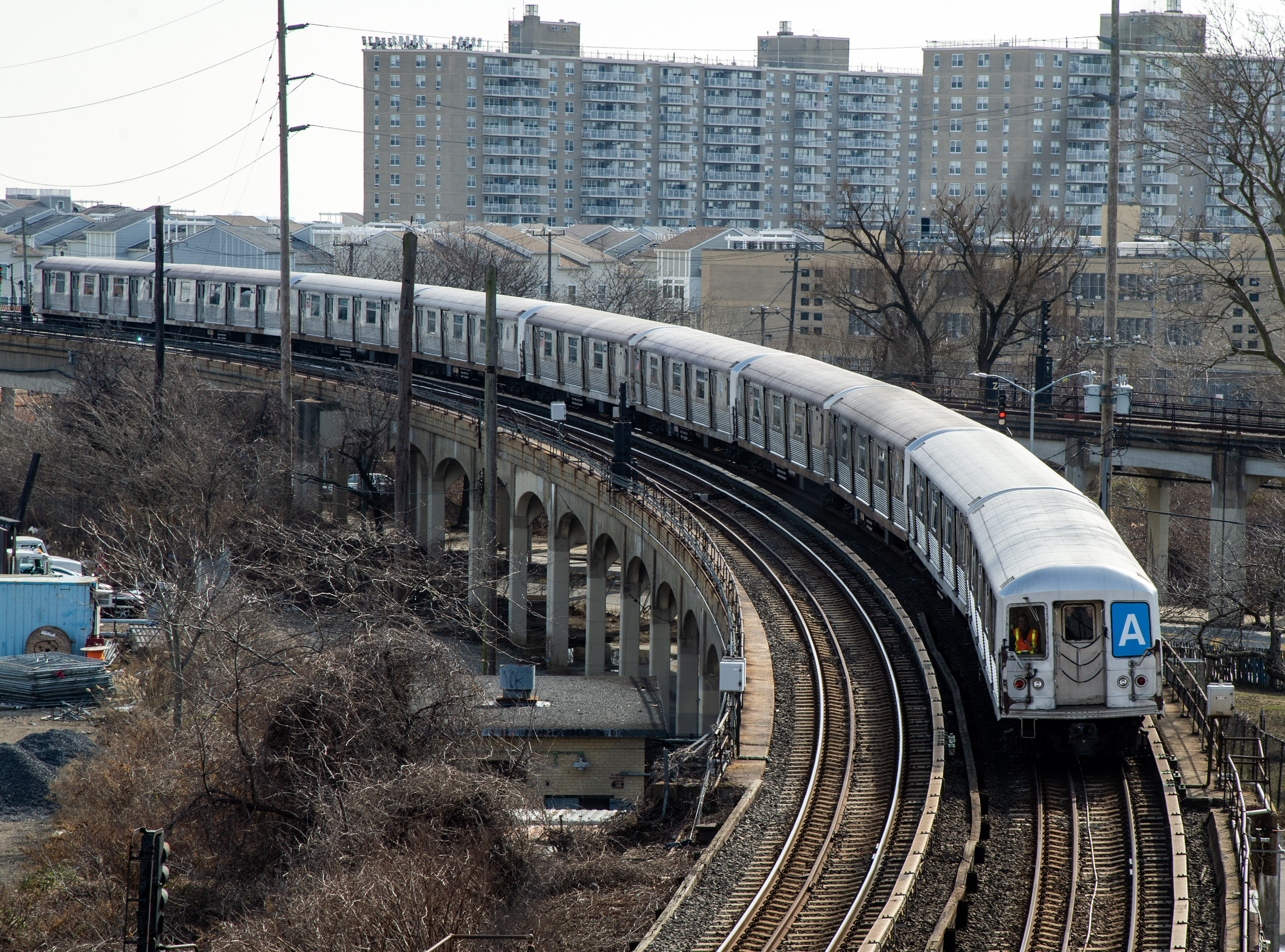
Final trip of the R42s on February 12, 2020

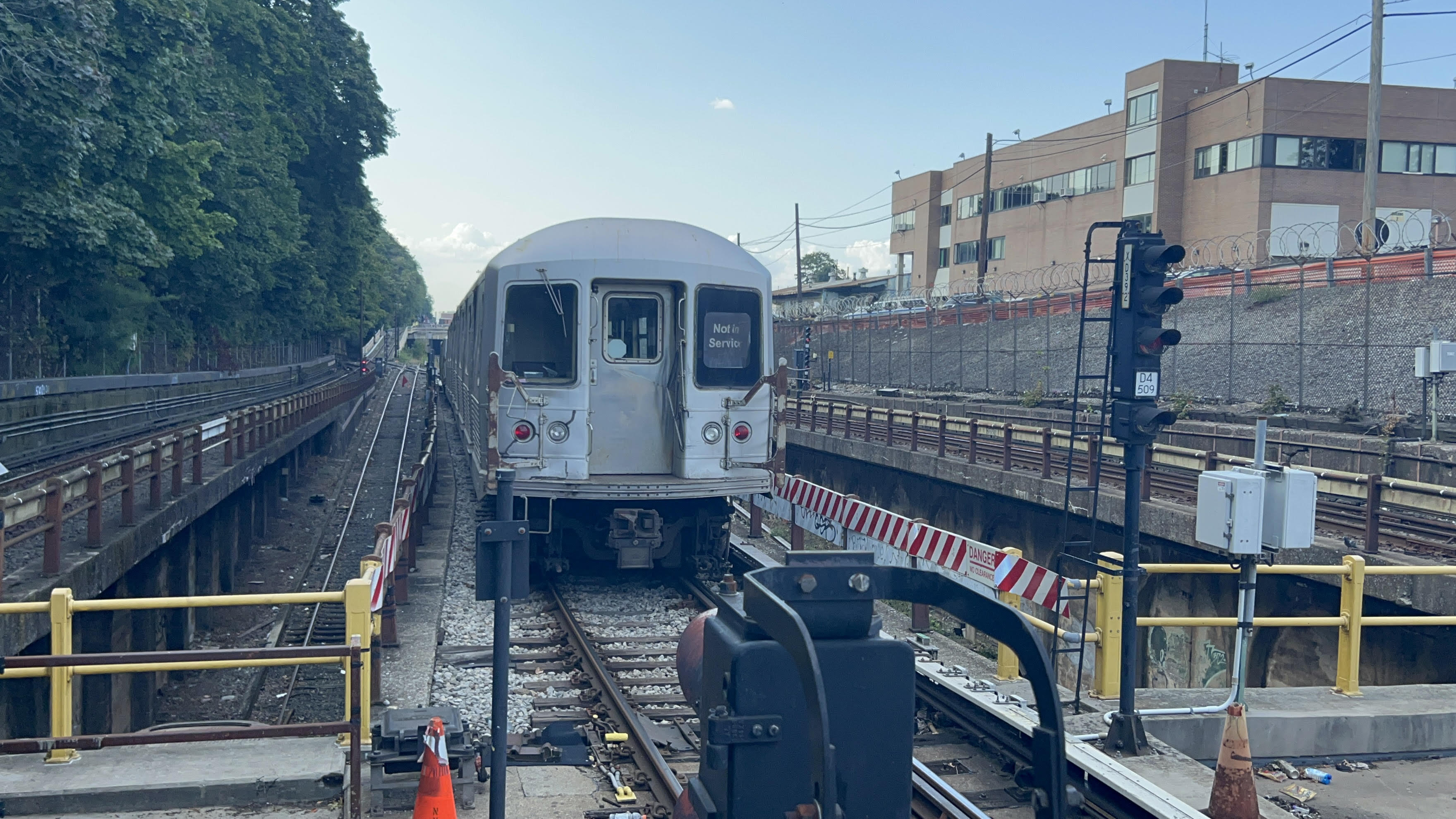
R42 cars on a refuse collection train at Ninth Avenue station

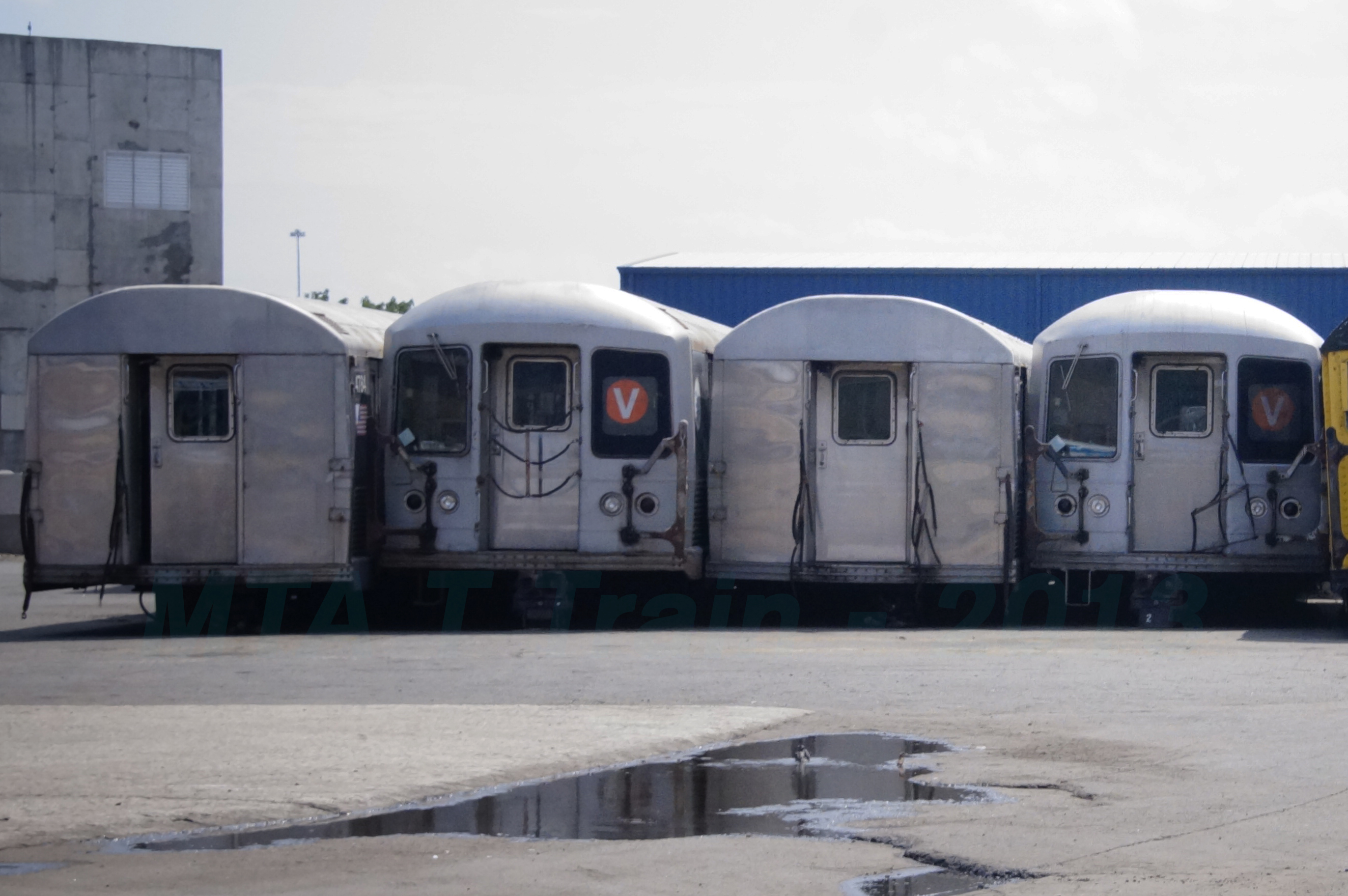
R42 cars awaiting to be scrapped

In July 2002, the MTA awarded contracts to Alstom and Kawasaki for the delivery and purchase of new subway cars (the R160) in order to retire the R42s, as well as the other B Division 60-foot cars (R32s, R38s, and R40s). In December 2007, an arrangement was made with the Delaware Department of Natural Resources and Environmental Control to create artificial reefs with the R42s and other retired subway car models off of the coast of Cape Henlopen, Delaware, similar to how the A Division Redbirds were processed and reefed from 2001 to 2003.

The R42 fleet began being withdrawn from service, starting with the Coney Island-rebuilt cars from August 2006 to May 2008, due to lack of quality control when the fleet was being overhauled at the Coney Island Overhaul Shop. The first two cars to be retired, mismated pair 4878/4927 were removed from service in August 2006, moved to the SBK Yard for asbestos abatement in July 2007, and submerged as artificial reefs off the coast of Delaware on January 12, 2008. A majority of the Coney Island-rebuilds were out of service by November 2007. Subsequently, with the exception of the eight cars involved in the accident that occurred on November 6, 2007, most Morrison–Knudsen-rebuilt cars followed beginning in December 2008; however, on December 18, 2009, the MTA decided to move forward with retiring the New York City Transit R44s instead of the remaining R42s. As a result, 64 Morrison–Knudsen-rebuilds (50 of which were available for active service) were retained when the MTA decided to place a hold on retiring any 60-foot cars. 50 cars (4788–4817 and 4820–4839) remained and were assigned to East New York Yard, operating on the J and Z. These 50 cars periodically underwent SMS (Scheduled Maintenance Service, a life extension program) cycles.

In March 2012, the MTA awarded a contract to Bombardier for the delivery and purchase of new subway cars (the R179) in order to retire the remaining R32s and R42s. Since the delivery of the four-car R179 sets, demand for the R42s drastically lowered. By late April 2019, they were no longer formally assigned for revenue service, becoming a contingency fleet. With the R179 delivery completed, the R42s were gradually phased out until the last train made its final trip on the J on December 30, 2019. However, from January 8 through January 24, 2020, the R42s were restored to revenue service due to the R179s being pulled from service. On February 12, 2020, the R42s were officially retired when the last train made its final trip on the A as part of a ceremonial farewell excursion sponsored by the New York Transit Museum.

Following retirement, nearly all cars retired by the R160s were stripped of parts and sunk as artificial reefs. After the reefing program ended in April 2010, leftover retired R42s were trucked to Sims Metal Management's Newark facility to be scrapped and processed in mid-2013. On the other hand, the 50 cars retired by the R179s were gradually reassigned to work service starting in summer 2020; they handle such tasks as providing traction for B Division rail adhesion trains and refuse collection trains. 48 of these 50 cars remain in work service; car 4816 was damaged in an accident at Coney Island Yard in October 2022, then removed off property along with its mate 4817 on April 15, 2023.

Other R42 cars were saved for various purposes throughout the New York City Subway system. The full list includes:

- 4572–4573 – preserved by the New York Transit Museum. This pair was used in the famous chase scene in the film The French Connection. The cars have been used on several recent NYTM fan trips, specifically as a part of the Train of Many Metals (TOMM).
- 4665 (and its R40A mate 4460) – preserved by the Railway Preservation Corp.
- 4736–4737 – donated to East New York's Transit Tech High School on April 14, 2009, replacing R30 car 8337, which was reefed a few months later.

== In popular culture ==
An R42 is featured in film The French Connection. The subway cars have been used as a chase scene and crashes into an R32.
