= Craggy Mountain Line =

Railroad museum in North Carolina

Coordinates: 35°38′21″N 82°34′44″W

The Craggy Mountain Line is a non-profit, all volunteer run railroad museum located in Asheville, North Carolina. Craggy Mountain Line operates from May through the end of September. The collection includes local historic cars from Asheville in addition to transit cars from Chicago and New York City.
