= R6 (New York City Subway car) =

Retired class of New York City Subway car

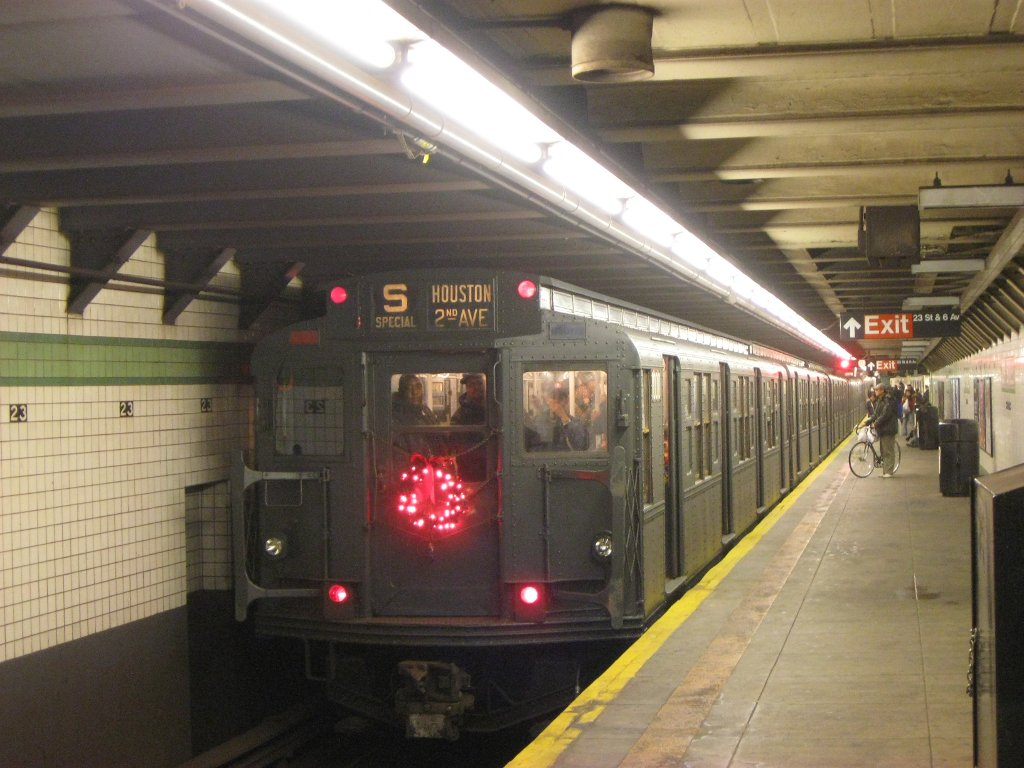
- R6 car 1000 at 23rd Street on the Holiday Shopper's Special
- In service: 1935–1977 (42 years)
- Manufacturers: American Car and Foundry Company, Pullman Standard, Pressed Steel Car Company
- Built at: Berwick, Pennsylvania
- Family name: R1–9s
- Constructed: 1935–1936
- Number built: 500
- Number preserved: 7
- Number scrapped: 493
- Successor: R44 and R46
- Formation: motorized single units (Half-width operator's cab at each end; conductor controls on exterior)
- Fleet numbers: 900–1399
- Capacity: 56 seats
- Operators: Independent Subway System; NYC Board of Transportation; New York City Transit Authority

Specifications
- Car body construction: Riveted steel
- Car length: 60 feet 2 1/2 inches (18.35 m)
- Width: 10 ft 0 in (3.05 m)
- Height: 12 feet 1 5/8 inches (3.70 m)
- Doors: 8 sets of 45 inch wide side doors per car
- Weight: 84,228 lb (38,205 kg)
- Traction system: Westinghouse ABF type UP143B switch group, with XM-29 master controller using Westinghouse 570-D5 or General Electric 714-C1, 714-C2 190 hp (142 kW) per motor. Two motors per car (both on motor truck, trailer truck not motorized).
- Power output: 190 hp (142 kW) per traction motor *Motor Power: 190 hp (142 kW) per motor
- Electric systems: 600 V DC third rail
- Current collection: Top-running contact shoe
- Braking systems: WABCO Schedule AMUE with UE-5 universal valve, ME-23 brake stand, and simplex clasp brake rigging
- Coupling system: WABCO H2A
- Headlight type: incandescent light bulb
- Track gauge: 4 ft 8 1/2 in (1,435 mm)

The R6 was a New York City Subway car model built from 1935 to 1936 for the city-operated Independent Subway System by three manufacturers under separate orders, the American Car and Foundry Company, Pullman Standard, and Pressed Steel Car Company. A total of 500 cars were built, numbered 900–1399, and arranged as single units. There were three versions of the R6: R6-1, R6-2, and R6-3. The R6s were a continuation of the R4 fleet and look almost the same, except that the R6 had a two-pane front window compared to the R4's one-pane window.

The R6s were used primarily for increased service in Queens and Brooklyn. They served exclusively on all IND lines for most of their service lives, but were also used on the BMT Division's Eastern Division's J and L lines during their final years of service. The R44s and R46s replaced the R6 cars, and they made their final runs in 1977. After retirement, most of the fleet was scrapped, but several R6-3s and one R6-1 have been preserved.

== Description ==
The R6s were numbered 900–1399. The contract had three separate orders from different manufacturers due to the large order. The R6 separate orders were R6-3 (American Car and Foundry Company, cars 900–1149), R6-2 (Pullman Standard, cars 1150–1299), and R6-1 (Pressed Steel Car Company, cars 1300–1399). Regardless, all three orders were nearly identical to each other.

The R6s were ordered to equip extensions of the IND in Brooklyn and Queens. They were used for service on the IND exclusively until 1976, when a few were displaced from the IND by the new R46 and transferred to the East New York Yard.

Many R6s were replaced by renumbered R1s and R4s beginning in 1973 as the R44s were arriving. These continued to run on the IND until 1976 and on the BMT Eastern Division until 1977.

== Preservation ==
Upon their retirement, most R6 cars were scrapped. However, seven examples have survived into preservation:

- R6-3 cars 923 and 925 were converted to revenue collection cars and formerly renumbered R247 and R248, respectively. Once they were no longer needed as work cars, they were purchased and preserved by Railway Preservation Corp. They remained stored in Coney Island Yard for many years until they were moved again to 207th Street Yard. Restoration will be needed if these cars are to run again.
- Part of R6-3 car 978 was repurposed into a deli (Golden's Deli) at the Staten Island Mall until the deli was closed in January 2012, though it does not have trucks. The owners of the deli placed the car in storage and ultimately decided to sell the car. The car was successfully sold and was restored by a private owner in Warwick, NY.
- R6-3 car 983 was originally on private property in Jacksonville, Florida, where it was used as a tool shed until 2013. It was purchased by the Craggy Mountain Line in Asheville, North Carolina in early 2013 and has been restored to operating service for their museum. The car uses trucks from scrapped R32s.
- R6-3 car 1000 is preserved by Railway Preservation Corp. and restored.
- R6-3 car 1144 is preserved at the Buckinghamshire Railway Centre in Quainton, England, though it does not have trucks. It was repurposed into a cafeteria for the museum.
- R6-1 car 1300 is preserved by Railway Preservation Corp. and restored.

R6-2 car 1208 was previously preserved by the New York Transit Museum. However, it was scrapped during the 1980s, along with several other museum cars.
