= R40 (New York City Subway car) =

Retired class of New York City Subway car

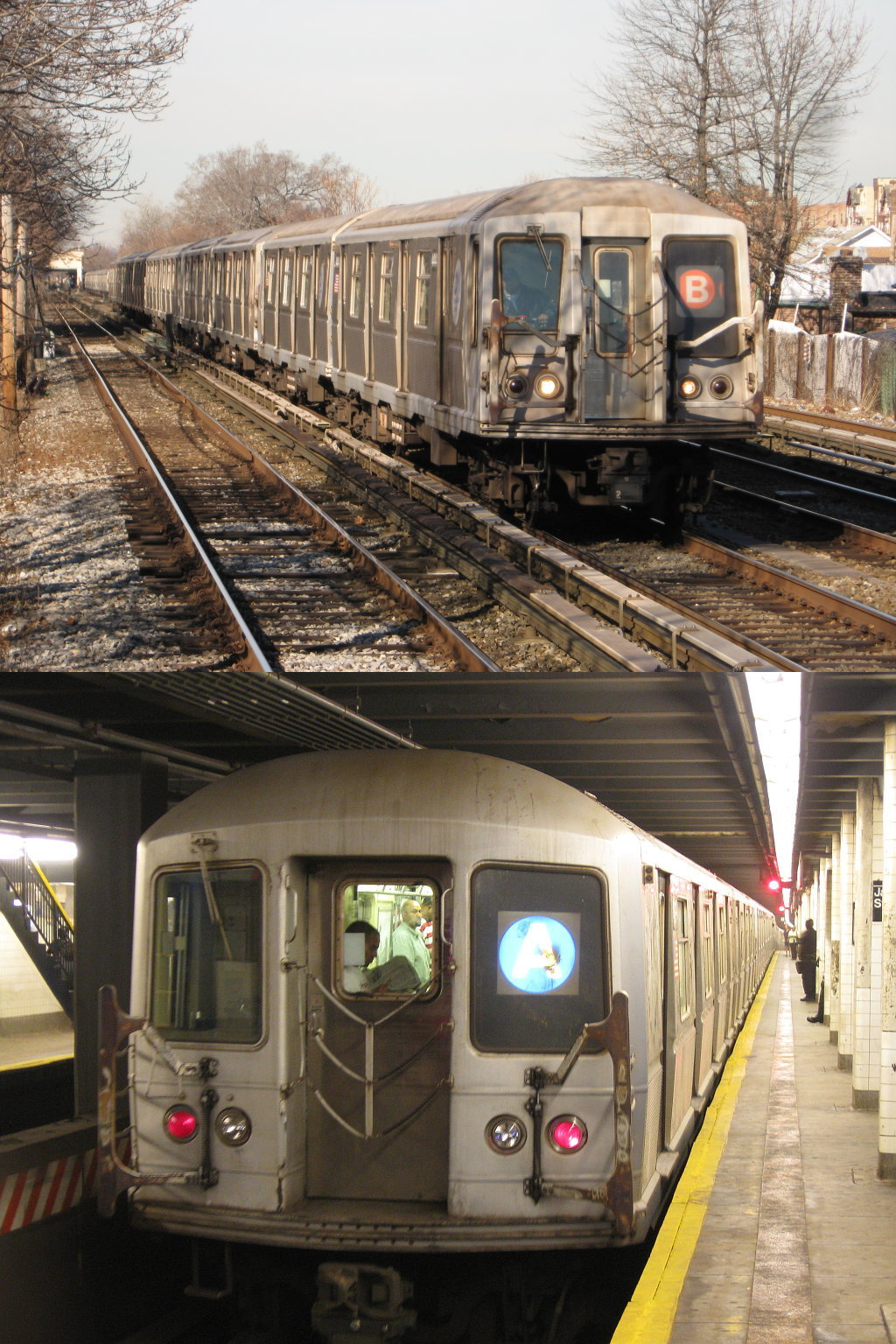
- Slant-ended (above) and modified straight-ended (below) variants

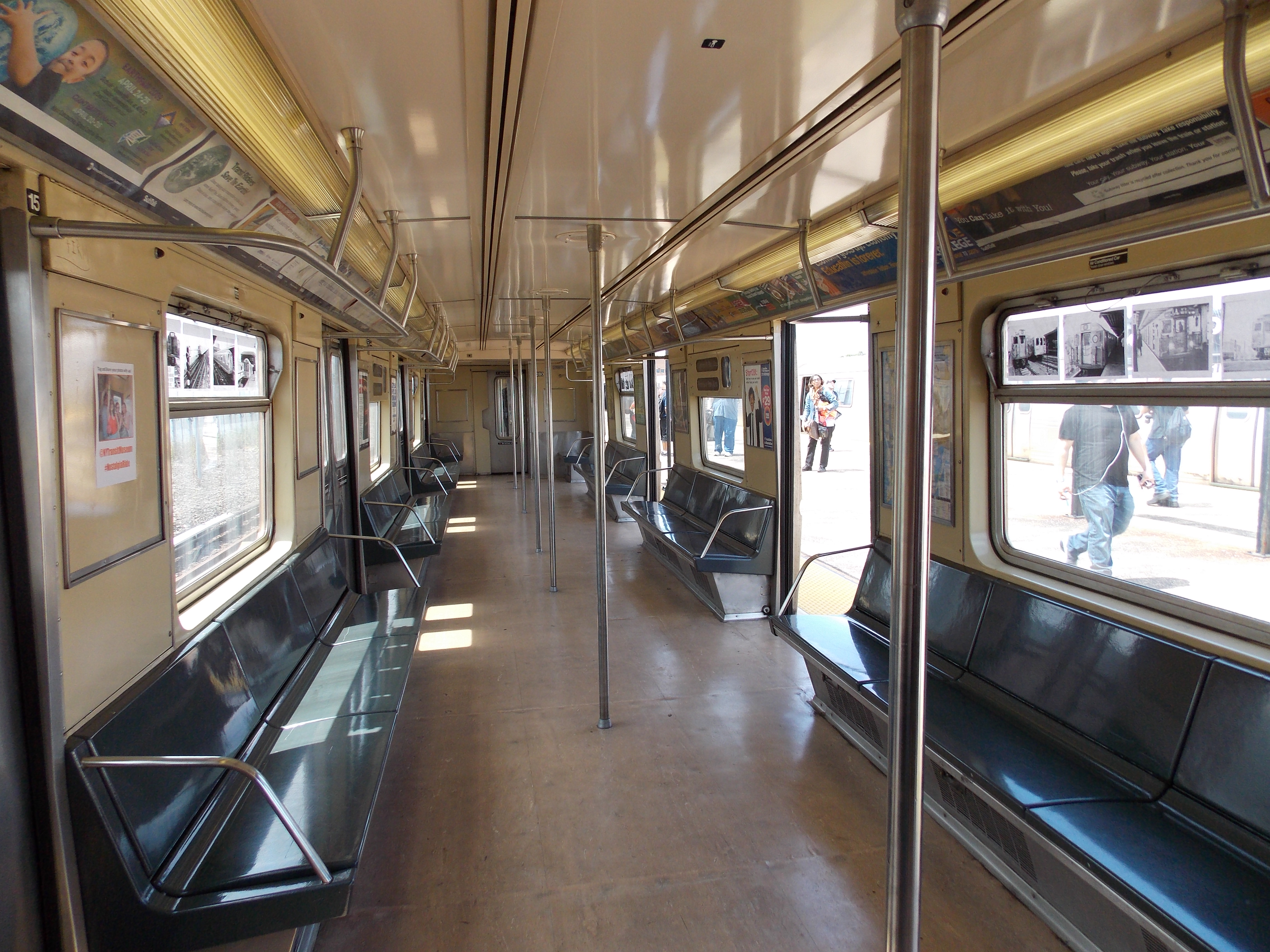
- Interior of an R40 car
- In service: March 23, 1968 – August 28, 2009 (41 years)
- Manufacturer: St. Louis Car Company
- Built at: St. Louis, Missouri, USA
- Replaced: Many remaining BMT Standards; Some R1s
- Constructed: R40: 1967–1968; R40A: 1968–1969
- Entered service: March 23, 1968
- Refurbished: 1986–1989
- Scrapped: 2008–2010, 2013
- Number built: 400: 200 R40s; 100 slant end R40As; 100 straight end R40As
- Number preserved: 6 (2 R40s, 4 R40As)
- Number scrapped: 394
- Successor: R160
- Fleet numbers: R40: 4150–4349 (4250–4349 renumbered from 4350–4449 in 1970); R40A: 4350–4449 (slant-ended) 4450–4549 (straight-ended)
- Capacity: 44 (seated)
- Operator: New York City Subway

Specifications
- Car body construction: Stainless steel sides with carbon steel chassis and underframes, fiberglass A-end bonnet
- Car length: 60 ft 2.5 in (18.35 m)
- Width: 9 ft 9 in (2.97 m)
- Height: 12 ft 1.625 in (3.70 m)
- Platform height: 3 ft 9.125 in (1.15 m)
- Doors: 8 sets of 50 inch wide side doors per car
- Maximum speed: 55 mph (89 km/h)
- Weight: 77,695 lb (35,242 kg) (slant); 78,030 lb (35,394 kg)
- Traction system: General Electric SCM 17KG192AE2 propulsion system using GE 1257E1 motors (115 hp or 85.76 kW per axle)
- Acceleration: 2.5mph/s
- Deceleration: ~3mph
- Braking systems: Westinghouse Air Brake Company "SMEE" Braking System, A.S.F. simplex unit cylinder clasp (tread) brake
- Safety system: emergency brakes
- Headlight type: halogen light bulbs
- Track gauge: 4 ft 8 1/2 in (1,435 mm)

The R40 was a New York City Subway car model built by the St. Louis Car Company from 1967 to 1969 for the IND/BMT B Division. There were 400 cars in the R40 fleet, arranged in married pairs. Two versions of the R40 were manufactured: the original 200-car R40 order built in 1967–1968, and the supplementary 200-car R40A order built in 1968–1969, with the last 100 cars of the supplementary order re-designed with straight ends. The 200 original R40s and the first 100 R40As were unique for their futuristic 10-degree slanted end (designed by the firm Raymond Loewy and Associates, and William Snaith Inc.) and were nicknamed the R40 Slants or simply Slants. Due to safety concerns, the final 100 cars of the R40A order were re-designed with traditional straight-ends by Sundberg-Ferar and became known unofficially as the "R40M" (M for modified).

The first R40s entered service on March 23, 1968. Various modifications were made over the years to the R40 fleet, including a complete overhaul from 1986–1989 by Sumitomo Corp. of America. The R160 subway car order replaced all of the R40s and R40As from 2007 to 2009; the last slant-ended train ran on June 12, 2009, while the last straight-ended R40As ran on August 28, 2009. After being retired, most R40s and R40As were stripped and sunk into the Atlantic Ocean as artificial reefs, but a pair of R40 slants and several straight-ended R40As have survived.

== Description ==
There were two versions of the R40: the original order from 1967 to 1968, and the second order, the R40As, built from 1968 to 1969. The R40s were originally numbered 4150–4249 and 4350–4449. In 1970, cars 4350–4449 were renumbered to 4250–4349. The slant-ended R40As were originally numbered 4450–4549, and the straight-ended R40As were originally numbered 4250–4349; these cars were later renumbered to 4350–4449 and 4450–4549, respectively.

Type	Original numbers	New numbers	Air conditioning (as delivered)
R40	4150–4249	Same	No
R40A (straight ends)	4250–4349	4450–4549	Yes
R40	4350–4449	4250–4349	No
R40A (slant ends)	4450–4549	4350–4449	Yes

Like the R38 order, the R40 was manufactured with stainless steel car-bodies, fiberglass end-caps, and carbon steel underbodies.

The width of the doors was increased from 45 to 50 inches (114 to 127 cm), which would become standard until the R142 on the A division and R211 on the B division.

The R40 was the second of four subway car types built in succession by the St. Louis Car Company for the NYCTA, in a period that spanned from 1965–1973. As the straight-ended R40As and the subsequent R42 order were nearly identical, they were often operated together in mixed-consists.

=== Signage ===
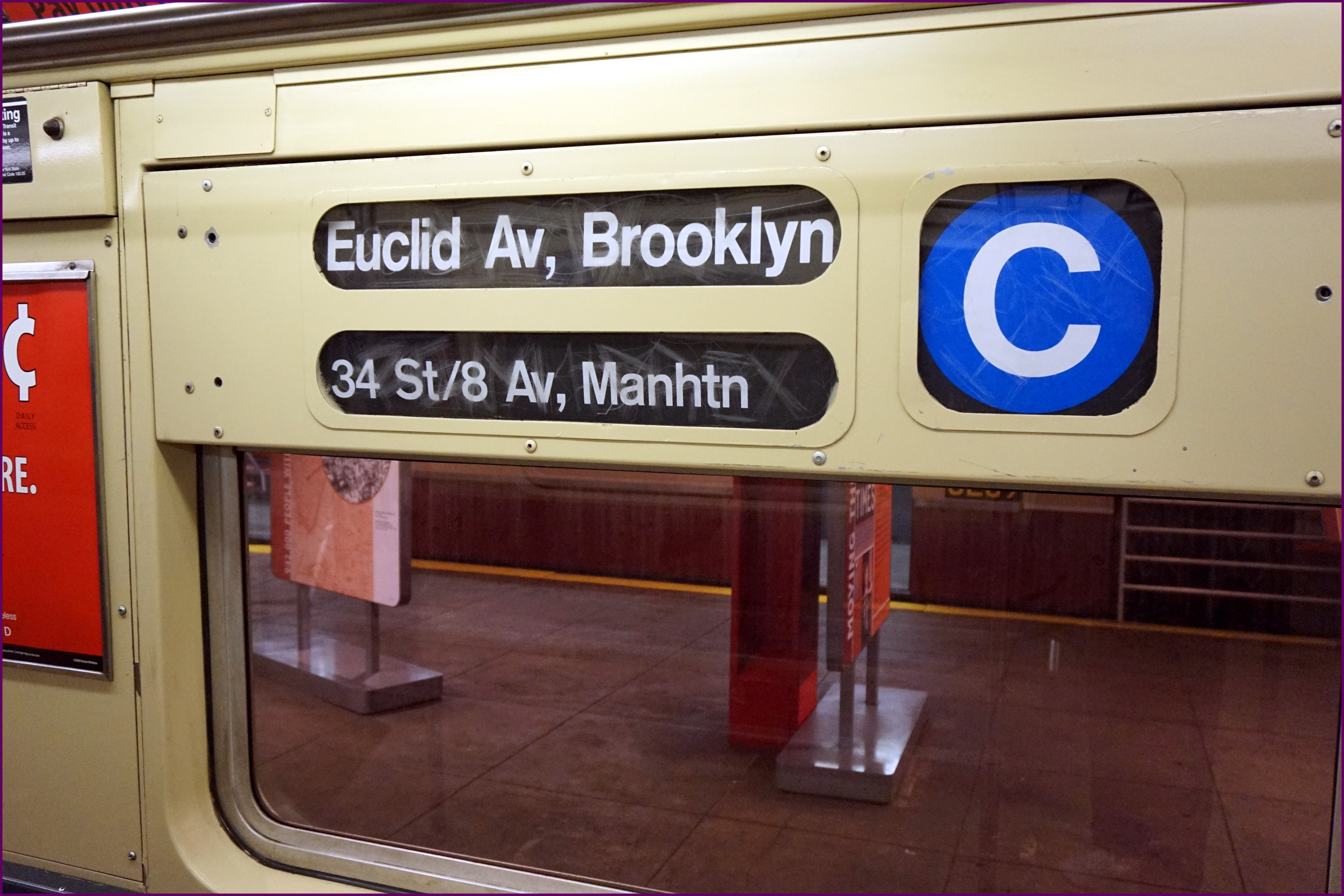
Side route and destination rollsigns of an overhauled R40 Slant

Compared to the preceding R38 order, route signage on the R40s differed significantly, being the first order to enter service after the opening of the Chrystie Street Connection in 1967. Located on the upper part of the middle set of windows, the new arrangement originally used a single sign that displayed the service and termini on the outside, and a route diagram on the inside. This was later replaced by a three-sign system, with a square sign that displayed the route bullet on the left side and rectangular signs displaying the line's terminal stations on the right side when viewed from the exterior, with the orientation being reversed when viewed from the interior. In addition, the cab ends of the cars now featured a single roll-sign, located on the opposite side of the driver's cabin, that displaying the route. When first introduced, this was a very large sign with a background corresponding to the service's color, but had been replaced with smaller signs only displaying the bullet around 1978. This replaced the overhead twin roll-signs that displayed both the route bullet and directional terminal station. This pattern became standard for all subsequent roll-signs, albeit with slight placement and design variations, until the R142 and R142A orders in 1999, which switched to a single red LED sign up front with the route, and the sides signs displaying the current destination and the line all in yellow with LEDs and LCDs, which that became standard for the first “generation” of New Technology Trains. A hybrid of the three styles was then introduced on the R211 order in 2021, with the route bullet in full color LEDs up front, the destination up top, and the side signs using a full-color LED route bullet and the destination with white LEDs.

Moreover, the R40s and slant-ended R40As were the last subway cars to feature distinctive "EXP" (express) and "LOCAL" marker lights on the cab ends, albeit centered. When the straight-ended R40As arrived, the use of these marker lights was discontinued.

== History ==
In December 1965, the NYCTA contracted Raymond Loewy and Associates along with William Snaith Inc. to design a new subway car that would be "dramatically different in exterior and interior", with the firms conceiving a unique and futuristic 10-degree slanted end for the new cars. The more attractive design was intended to beautify the subway and was part of an effort to convince people to abandon their cars for mass-transit. On September 20, 1966, the NYCTA announced plans to order 400 subway cars with this new design. In addition to the slanted ends, the new cars were to have wider doors and windows, easier-to-read signage, and improved interiors with light colors. Bids were opened to the public on October 1, 1966. In November 1966, the St. Louis Car Company was awarded the contract at $114,000 per car. The new cars cost a total of $46,172,041, with the cost to be split evenly between the Federal Government and the City of New York.

The first incomplete pair of R40s (cars 4350–4351) arrived on TA property in November 1967 for promoting of the Transportation Bond issue on Election Day. They were then returned to the assembly plant in St. Louis for completion and delivered in January 1968. On March 23, 1968, the R40 fleet entered service on the F. All 300 slanted R40s were delivered as of January 24, 1969, with the first modified R40As delivered in January 1969.

At the cost of an additional $14,000 per car, the 300 R40As were delivered new with the same successful Stone-Safety 10 ton air conditioning systems/units found on the last ten R38 cars. From this point forward, air conditioning became standard equipment on all future subway car orders. Due to the placement of the air conditioning system, the standee poles were arranged in an alternating pattern rather than the straight-line pattern seen in the R40s, which lacked air conditioning systems/units until their overhauls. In addition, the exterior of an air-conditioned R40A could be told apart by its non air-conditioned R40 counterpart by examining the roof-line; cars equipped with air conditioning had significantly thinner air intakes.

Notably, the R40s were the final subway cars ordered prior to the 1968 merger between the New York City Transit Authority and the state-run Metropolitan Transportation Authority.

=== Safety concerns and controversies ===
Within months of the first cars being delivered, safety concerns and controversies surrounded the new slant-ended design. Due to the lack of handholds on the slant-ends, concerns were raised that passengers walking in between cars could fall onto the tracks. As a temporary fix, the NYCTA ordered conductors to lock the doors at the slant ends of each car. Meanwhile, the director of design at Raymond Loewy claimed that there was to be no passage between subway cars; the doors were to be locked and thus the safety features would have been unneeded. In November 1968, the NYCTA began modifying the slant-ended fleet at a cost of $400,000 with large grab rails and pantograph gates, which effectively destroyed Loewy's design, but allowed passengers to travel safely between cars. Moreover, a transit union newspaper reported that the modifications were necessary as "there is reason to believe" the cars would be deformed if they bumped, and re-iterated that the slant ends posed a danger to passengers walking in between cars.

As an even more drastic measure, the NYCTA announced that the remaining 100 R40A cars on order would be redesigned. As a result, the last 100 R40As were built with a modified straight-ended style designed by Sundberg-Ferar (nicknamed the R40M), a design that would be used on the subsequent (and nearly identical) R42 order.

In 1977, pantograph gates, salvaged from retired R1 through R9 cars, were modified and then installed on the front ends of the straight-ended R40A and R42 cars. Since the straight-ended R40As came factory equipped with "baloney" coil spring-type intercar safety barriers on their blind ends, they did not need such installations that the R42s received.

=== Mishaps and overhaul ===
Pair 4200–4201 was badly damaged in a rear-end accident on the North Channel Bridge on September 12, 1970, and subsequently scrapped. On February 12, 1974, pair 4420–4421 was damaged when they were rear-ended by R6 # 1236, which also suffered extensive damage due to brake failure at Church Avenue station on the southbound express track between 7th Ave and Church Ave. Due to the damage sustained in the incidents above, both pairs were scrapped prior to the rebuilding of the R40/R40A fleet.

The R40s were rebuilt beginning in 1986 under the General Overhaul (GOH) program as a result of deferred maintenance in the transit system during the 1970s and 1980s. Sumitomo was selected as the contractor to rebuild the entire fleet; the first six cars were delivered to Sumitomo's former U.S. Steel plant in Elmira Heights, New York during the fourth quarter of 1986. All cars now sported an unpainted silver exterior and new interior designs. In addition, air conditioning was retrofitted into the slant-ended cars that were not equipped with it from the factory. The distinctive "EXP" (express) and "LOCAL" marker lights on the slant-ended cars were also removed. By December 1988, 198 R40 "Slant" cars were rebuilt under the first phase of the overhaul contract by Sumitomo; the second phase of the overhaul contract to rebuild the remaining 98 "Slant" and 100 "Modified" cars also began around this time.

Car number 4259 was struck by an M train led by R42 car 4918 near 9th Avenue on February 5, 1995. It was partially repaired, but never returned to service and was ultimately sunken as an artificial reef in January 2008.

Car number 4260 derailed in the tunnel near 9th Avenue on August 15, 1994, and was scrapped in 2001. Its nose was used to rebuild straight-ended R40A number 4461 into a slant-ended car.

Car numbers 4427 and 4428 collided at the Bushwick Avenue–Aberdeen Street station on the L route on January 8, 1996, and sustained severe damage. They were both scrapped in 2001.

Cars 4258 and 4261, as well as cars 4426 and 4429, all of which had lost their mates in the above incidents, were mated as pairs.

On June 5, 1995, R42 number 4664 was rear-ended by straight-ended R40A number 4461 on the Williamsburg Bridge. The R42 was written off as it had sustained major damage, while the R40A was repaired and rebuilt into a slant-ended car. It was temporarily numbered 4260, as it was intended to be mated to R40 number 4259, but never returned to service. Meanwhile, straight-ended R40A number 4460 and R42 number 4665 became paired with each other. This pair today survives as part of the museum fleet.

=== Retirement ===
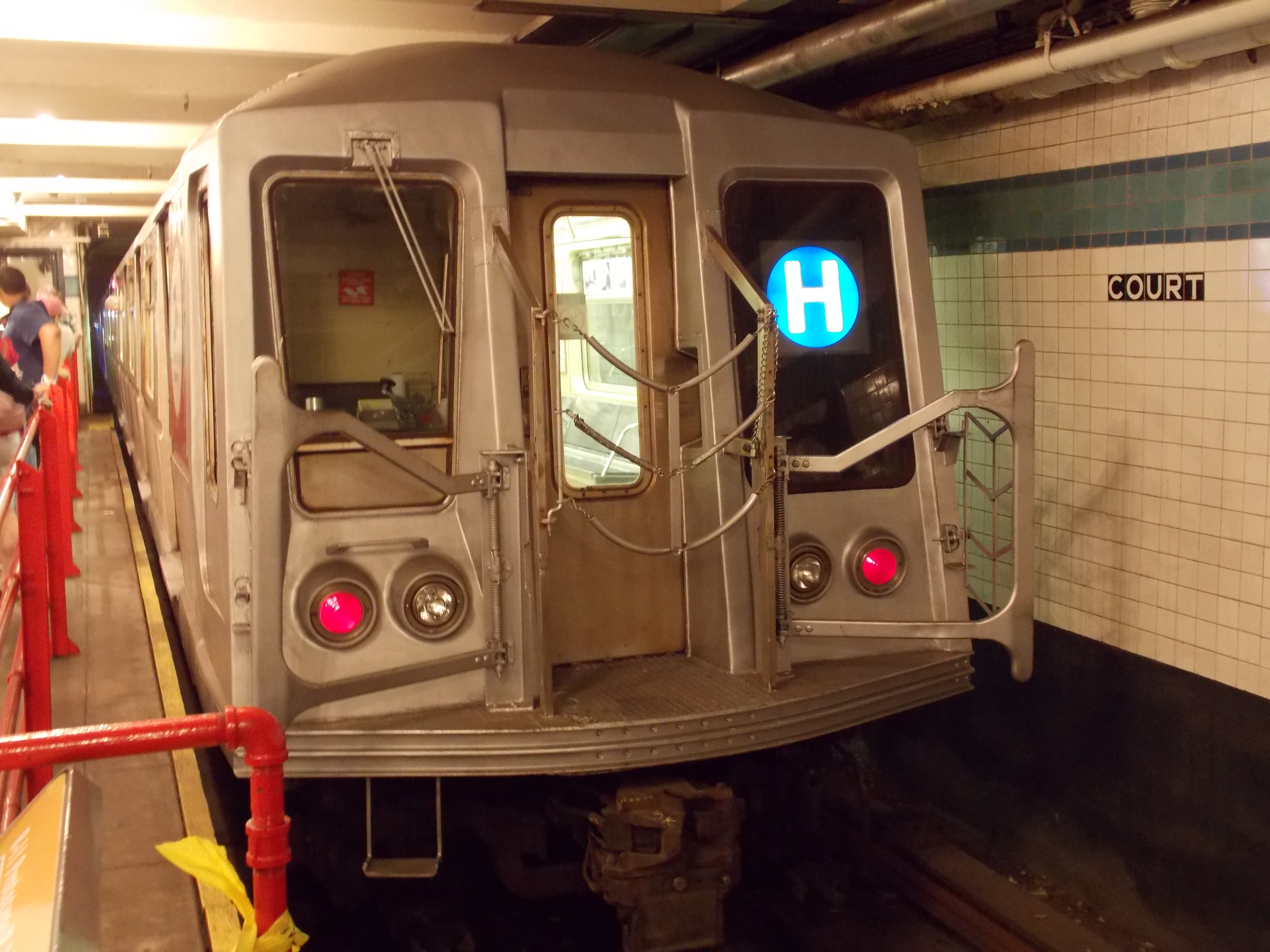
R40 cars 4280–4281 (originally 4380–4381) on display at the New York Transit Museum

In July 2002, the MTA awarded contracts to Alstom and Kawasaki for the delivery and purchase of new subway cars (the R160) in order to retire the R40s, as well as the other B Division 60-foot cars (R32s, R38s, and R42s). In December 2007, an arrangement was made with the Delaware Department of Natural Resources and Environmental Control to create artificial reefs with the R40s and other retired subway car models off of the coast of Cape Henlopen, Delaware, similar to how the A Division Redbirds were processed and reefed from 2001 to 2003.

The R40 fleet, starting with the slant-ended cars, began being withdrawn from service in October 2007, with car 4259 being the first car in the fleet to be stripped and sunken as an artificial reef on January 12, 2008; the straight-ended cars began being gradually withdrawn from service in January 2009. The last ten slant-ended cars on the active roster (cars 4256–4257, 4398–4399, 4432–4433, 4414–4415, and 4424–4425) made their last trip on the A on June 12, 2009; the last two straight-ended cars on the active roster (cars 4484–4485) made their last trip on the V on August 28, in a mixed consist with R42s.

The last R40/R40A cars to be removed from property by barge were R40 4272 and straight-ended R40As 4474–4475, which were reefed on April 17, 2010. However, R40 pair 4162–4163 and slant-ended R40A pairs 4392–4393 and 4442–4443 were retained as school cars until 2013. These cars were eventually decommissioned and trucked to Sims Metal Management in Newark, New Jersey, from April 2013 to October 1, 2013, for scrapping, as the reefing program had ended in April 2010.

R40s 4280–4281 (originally numbered 4380–4381) are preserved for the New York Transit Museum. They were restored to operating status in 2013–2014 and have been operating on New York City Transit Museum-sponsored excursions since August 2014, specifically on the Train of Many Metals (TOMM). Before cars 4280–4281 were selected for preservation, cars 4192–4193 were temporarily displayed at the New York Transit Museum in 2008, but they were later stripped and reefed.

In addition to the R40 pair, several straight-ended R40As have survived. The full list includes:

- 4460 (and its R42 mate 4665) – preserved by the Railway Preservation Corporation and stored at Coney Island Yard.
- 4461 (rebuilt into a slant-ended car and renumbered to 4260) – currently at the Randall's Island FDNY Facility, used with R62s 1366 and 1370 as training cars.
- Pair 4480–4481 – preserved by the New York Transit Museum. The cars were stored at the Concourse Yard until 2014, when they were moved to the 207th Street Yard.

== See also ==
- R42, a similar model to the straight-ended R40As also built by the St. Louis Car Company from 1969–1970.
