= R11/R34 (New York City Subway car) =

Retired class of New York City Subway car

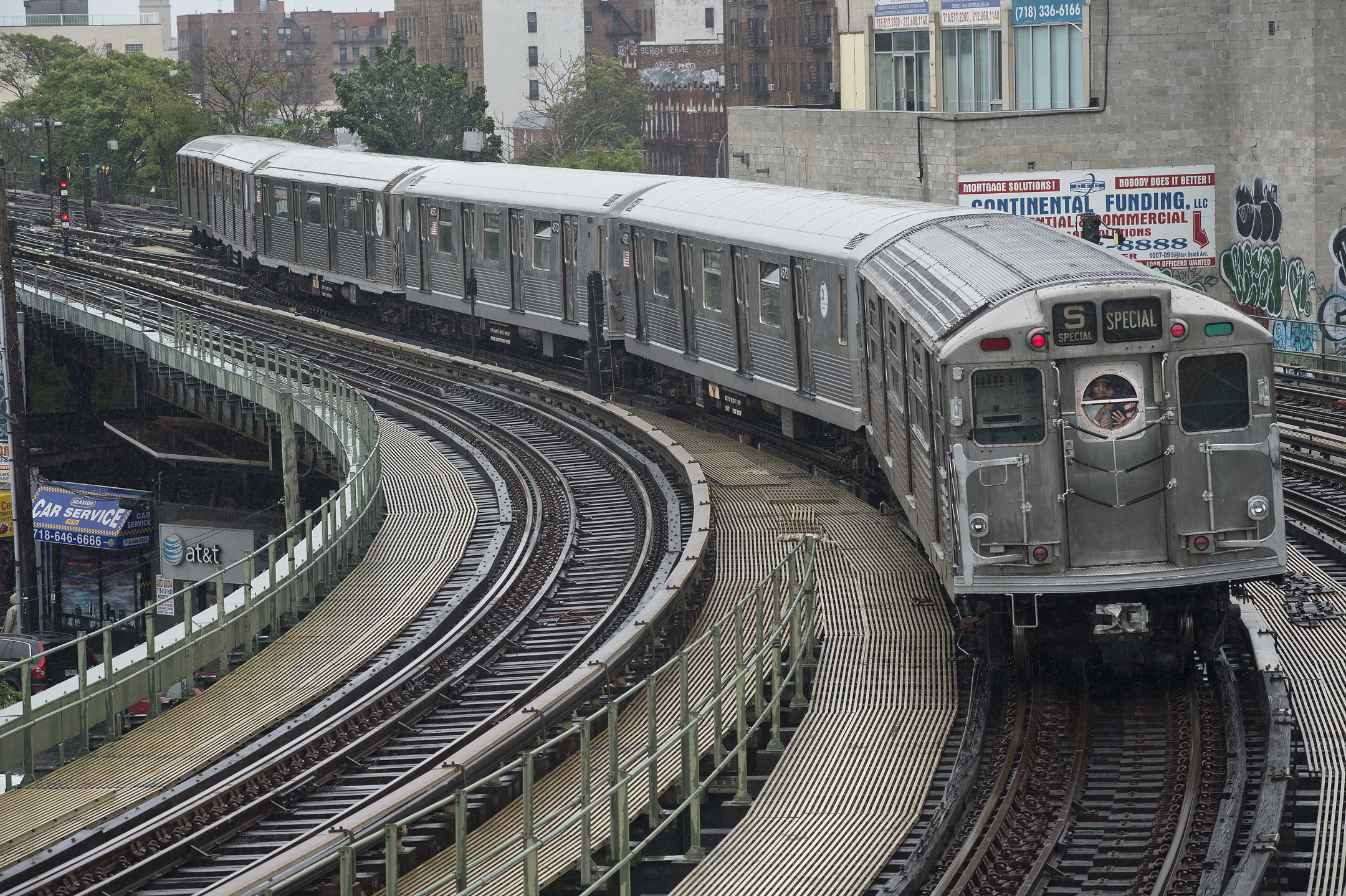
- R11/R34 car 8013 on the Train of Many Metals

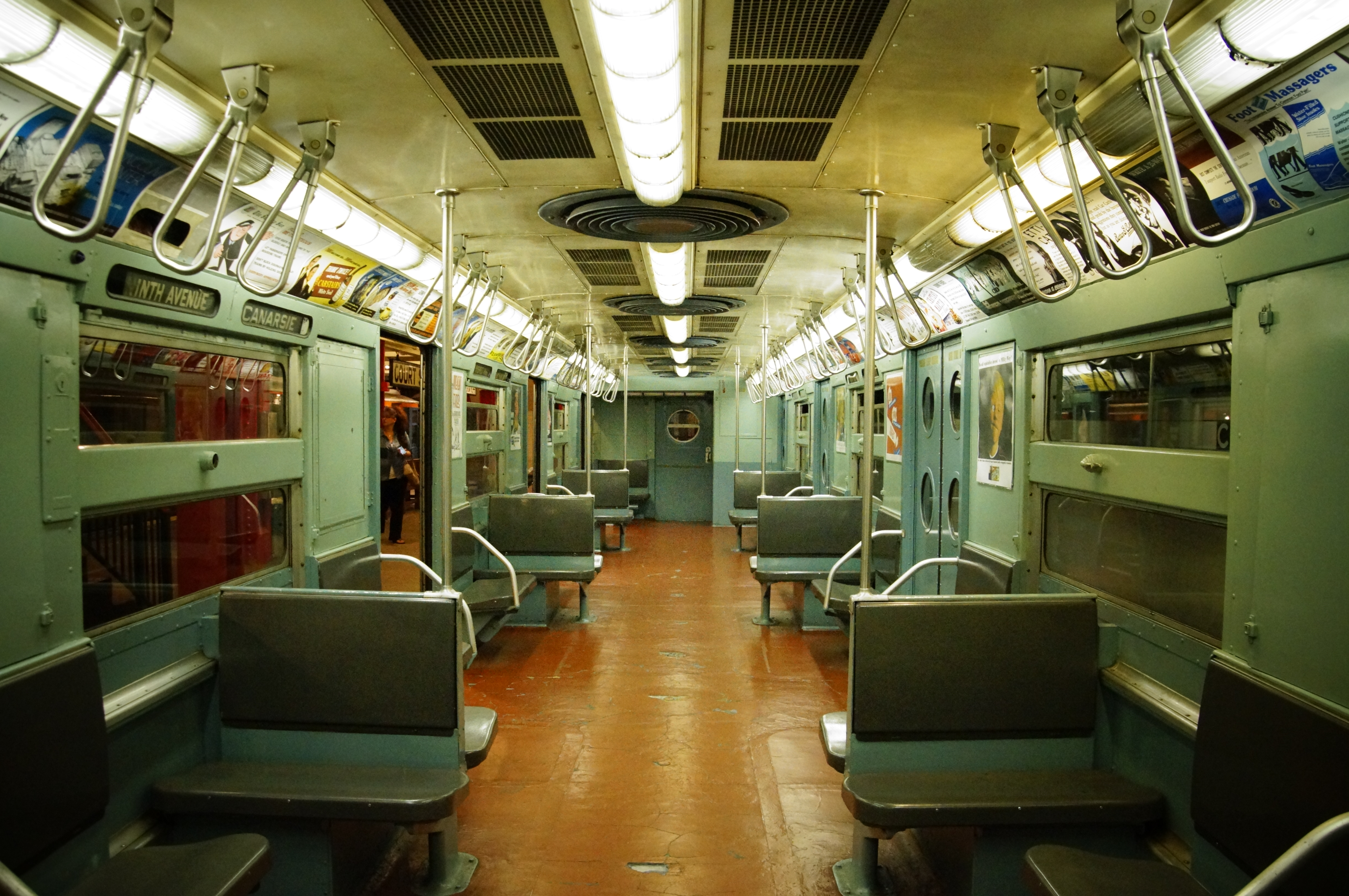
- Interior view of R11/R34 car 8013
- In service: 1949–1977 (28 years)
- Manufacturer: Budd Company
- Built at: Philadelphia, Pennsylvania
- Constructed: 1949
- Entered service: 1949
- Refurbished: 1964–1965
- Scrapped: 1980
- Number built: 10
- Number preserved: 1
- Number scrapped: 9
- Formation: Single unit cars
- Fleet numbers: 8010–8019
- Capacity: 56 (seated)
- Operators: NYC Board of Transportation; New York City Subway

Specifications
- Car body construction: Stainless steel
- Car length: over coupler faces: 60 ft 3 in (18.36 m)
- Width: 10 ft (3.05 m)
- Height: 12 ft 2.125 in (3.71 m)
- Floor height: 2 ft 10.125 in (0.87 m)
- Platform height: 3 ft 10 in (1.17 m)
- Doors: 8 sets of 50 inch wide side doors per car
- Maximum speed: 55 mph (89 km/h)
- Weight: Before overhaul: 81,476 lb (36,957 kg); After overhaul: 82,500 lb (37,421 kg)
- Traction system: Westinghouse type ABS switch group (model UP631B) with Westinghouse XM179 master controller, using 4 General Electric 1240B motors (100 hp or 75 kW each). 4 motors per car (2 per truck - all axles motorized).
- Power output: 100 hp (75 kW) per traction motor
- Acceleration: 2.5 mph/s (4.0 km/(h⋅s))
- Auxiliaries: Before overhaul: Edison B4H (32 Volt) battery with 24 cells. Battery charged primarily by Westinghouse XF23A motor alternator After overhaul: Edison B4H (32 Volt) battery with 24 cells. Battery charged primarily by YX304E motor generator
- Electric systems: 600 V DC third rail
- Current collection: Top running contact shoe
- Braking systems: Before overhaul: WABCO schedule SMEE with ME-42 brake stand and drum brakes. Air provided by WABCO 3-Y-C compressor After overhaul: WABCO schedule SMEE with ME-42 brake stand and disk brake rigging. Air provided by WABCO 3-Y-C compressor
- Coupling system: WABCO H2C
- Track gauge: 4 ft 8 1/2 in (1,435 mm)

The R11 was a prototype class of experimental New York City Subway cars built by the Budd Company in 1949 for the IND/BMT B Division. A total of ten cars were built, arranged as single units. Although there were originally plans to build 400 cars, only ten R11s were built due to the cancellation of the Second Avenue Subway.

The R11s were the first stainless steel R-type car built for the New York City Subway. The cars were mainly used as the newest technology prototype test train, introducing several new features that would be featured in later orders. They went through various modifications, including an overhaul in 1965 that upgraded many components and allowed for compatibility with other SMEE cars. The R11s remained in service until 1977, after which they were retired due to a yard accident damaging one car. Nine cars were scrapped, but one has been preserved.

== Description ==
The R11s were numbered 8010–8019. From 1964 to 1965, the R11s were overhauled under contract R34. Therefore, the cars are also known as R34s in their post-overhaul state.

Because each car cost more than $100,000, the R11s were frequently referred to as the "Million Dollar Train."

The R11 was the first stainless steel R-type car ever built; Budd previously built the BMT Zephyr – the first stainless steel subway car in the city – in 1934. Fifteen years after the building of the R11s, the Budd Company built the first bulk order of stainless steel cars in New York City Subway history, the R32.

The ornamental design of the car body featured standee windows separated by a heavy brace from the lower windows. This was due to the influence of noted industrial designer Otto Kuhler (US patent Des.153,367) and featured as part of a bid by the American Car and Foundry Company in 1947. The cars also implemented new technology in several areas. "Precipitron" lamps were included, designed to combat airborne bacteria. Forced air ventilation was introduced as ceiling vents circulated fresh air in from outside each car, while removing stale air. Electric door motors were used for the first time, replacing the standard air-powered door motors, which had served on much of the older equipment. However, these cars were also built with outside door operating apparatus or controls, along with an exterior mounted Public Address microphone system. Lastly, drum brakes were installed instead of conventional tread brakes.

== History ==
=== Background ===
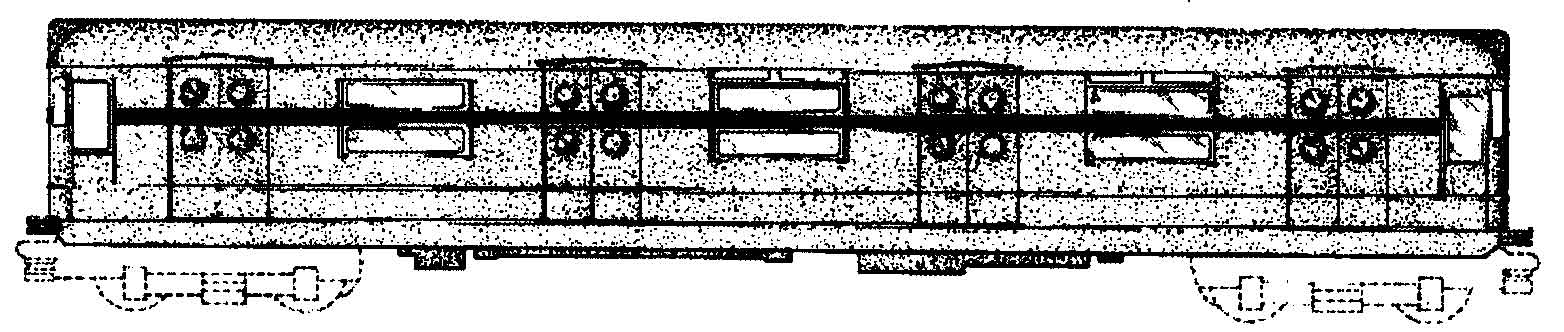
Otto Kuhler's patent of subway car filed in 1947 (copied by R11)

On June 19, 1947, the city announced the details of the $1,158,000 R11 subway car order. The equipment in the subway car was installed by Westinghouse Electric.

The full size of the R11 contract was 400 new subway cars, intended to provide service on the planned Second Avenue Subway. The subway, which was then slated to open in the 1950s, had been repeatedly delayed throughout its history, and the 10 cars ordered were to serve as the newest technology prototype test train available at the time. However, the remainder of the cars were never built due to the halt of construction on Second Avenue shortly thereafter. The subway itself opened in 2017, seventy years after the R11 was first announced.

=== Modifications and overhaul ===
The R11s originally used storm doors that were similar to those used in later SMEE cars, but by the early 1950s, those storm doors were modified to feature circular windows similar to those on the R15, R16, and R17 cars.

The ten R11s were overhauled in 1965 at the Transit Authority's own Coney Island Complex under contract R34. During the rebuild, the drum brakes were replaced with disk brakes, new fans were installed, and the middle stanchions were removed to improve passenger flow. The rebuild also included modifications that allowed the cars to operate in consists with other SMEE (contracts R10 through R42, as well as R62/A and R68/A) cars.

=== Retirement ===
Despite the overhaul, maintenance for the cars proved time-consuming and difficult by the 1970s, as special skills and components were needed to keep the cars in working order. Because there were only ten R11s, the cars were retired from service in 1977 following a yard accident that wrecked car 8016. By 1980, all cars, except 8013, were scrapped.

Car 8013 has been preserved by the New York Transit Museum. It was also damaged in the 1977 yard accident, but was repaired before being sent to the museum. The car was restored to operating status in 2013–2014 and has been operating on New York City Transit Museum-sponsored excursions since August 2014, specifically on the Train of Many Metals (TOMM). On July 30, 2017, the car made its first-ever run on the Second Avenue Subway with the TOMM consist, making a full round trip alongside the IND Second Avenue Line, BMT Broadway Line, and BMT Brighton Line between 96th Street and Coney Island–Stillwell Avenue.
