= Bluebird Compartment Car (New York City Subway car) =

Retired class of New York City Subway car

The BMT Bluebird Compartment Car stored in 36th Street Yard

The Bluebird, formally dubbed Compartment Car by its purchaser, the Brooklyn–Manhattan Transit Corporation (BMT), was an advanced design PCC streetcar-derived subway and elevated railway car built by the Clark Equipment Company from 1938 to 1940 and used on the New York City Subway system from 1939 to 1955. A total of six units were built, with one prototype and five production units. They were among the last cars to be ordered by the BMT before the city takeover in 1940.

The cars were designed to operate on both elevated and subway lines; its lightweight design allowed it to run on the oldest elevated lines without the need to upgrade them to handle heavier cars, while its aluminum alloy body also allowed it to run in the newer subway tunnels, where wooden cars were strictly prohibited. The prototype Bluebird entered service in 1939. While the BMT ordered 50 production Bluebirds, only five were built, due to the New York City Board of Transportation cancelling the order when it took over operations of the BMT in 1940. The cars were in service until being retired in 1955. None were preserved.

== Design ==
The articulated unit, 80 feet (24.38 m) long, 10 feet (3.05 m) wide and 12 feet (3.66 m) high, consisted of three compartments placed on four trucks, connected by fully enclosed, hinged passageways. The Bluebird was an example of Art Deco industrial design, presenting a clean and mildly streamlined appearance. The Bluebird was designed during the Great Depression as a fast, physically attractive, and comfortable mass transit vehicle that would attract passengers, while instituting significant economies in production, operation, and maintenance.

The car's lightweight body and running gear, combined with its short truckbase and segmented body, permitted it to operate on the oldest elevated structures, with their light loading tolerance and sharp curves, as well as in tunnel sections, where policy prohibited the use of the wooden cars typically used on elevated lines.

A single Bluebird unit, numbered 8000A/B/A1, was purchased by the BMT as a prototype for a planned fleet of equipment that could operate universally on both standard subway lines and older elevated lines. The BMT expected the Bluebird to preserve its investment in its elevated railway lines without expensive upgrading for heavier subway equipment, while attracting passengers with its interior comforts. Tests demonstrated that its greatly improved operating parameters could have cut significant time from existing elevated train schedules.

Bluebirds were the first PCC-derived rapid transit cars utilizing the advanced running gear originally created for new-design streetcars. In addition to quick acceleration and braking (4 mph/s or 6.4 km/(h⋅s)), the use of PCC technology meant that Bluebirds could share a significant part and maintenance base with the Brooklyn transit company's planned PCC trolley fleet, achieving economies of scale and efficiency.

The Bluebirds were built by Clark Equipment Company of Battle Creek, Michigan, maker of PCC running gear. They were the only rapid transit cars ever built by Clark, and the only passenger rail equipment ever built by the company, other than one PCC streetcar.

== Fleet history ==
Satisfied with tests on unit 8000, the BMT placed an order for an additional 50 units, which could replace 80 old elevated cars. However, the order was cancelled after the city government purchased the BMT in June 1940. The New York City Board of Transportation, already the operator of the Independent Subway System, was one of the most conservative transit operators in the United States, and had no interest in the former BMT's aggressive technology planning.

Five more Bluebirds were in the process of construction at the time of cancellation, and the City decided to accept these, numbering them 8001–8005A/B/A1. They could not interoperate with unit 8000, which had no couplers or multiple unit trainline connections. Unit 8000 spent much of its service life on the Franklin Avenue Shuttle, home of many pieces of orphaned equipment, while units 8001–8005 operated regularly on the 14th St.–Canarsie Line. On occasion, they also operated in Brighton–Franklin Avenue Local service and on the Fourth Avenue Local. In those instances, it typically operated as an extra behind a regular interval.

After delivery of the Bluebirds, New York City never again purchased any lightweight or PCC-technology rail equipment, nor did it purchase equipment to sustain the elevated lines incapable of operating heavier subway cars. Most of the elevated lines were dismantled between 1938 and 1990.

The single unit Bluebird 8000 was withdrawn from service for lack of available parts in 1945. The Bluebird train 8001–8005 continued in service until March 1955, replaced by the R16s. All of the Bluebird units, the single unit and the 5 unit train, were scrapped in 1957.
