= R68 (New York City Subway car) =

Class of New York City Subway car

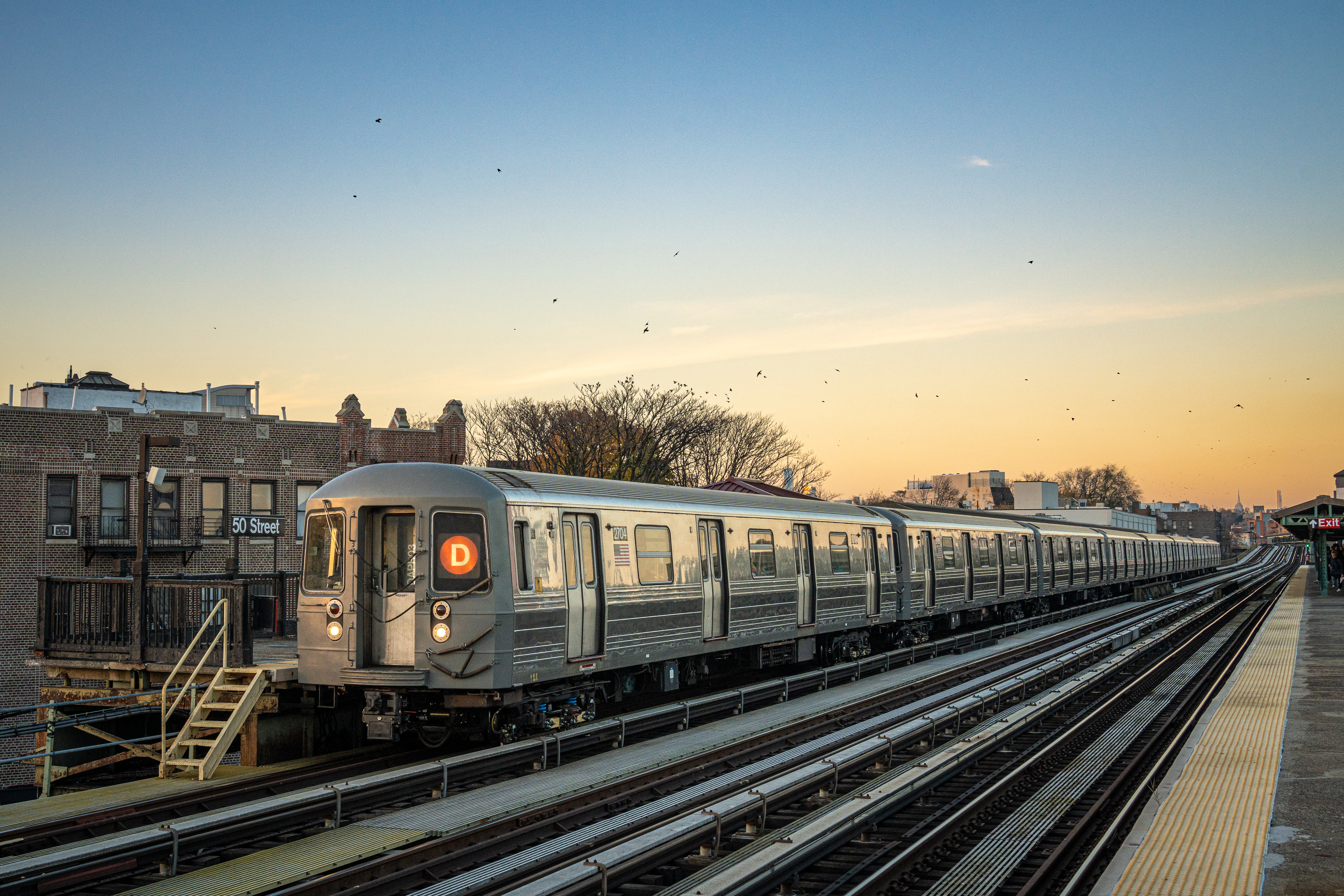
- An R68 train on the D at 50th Street

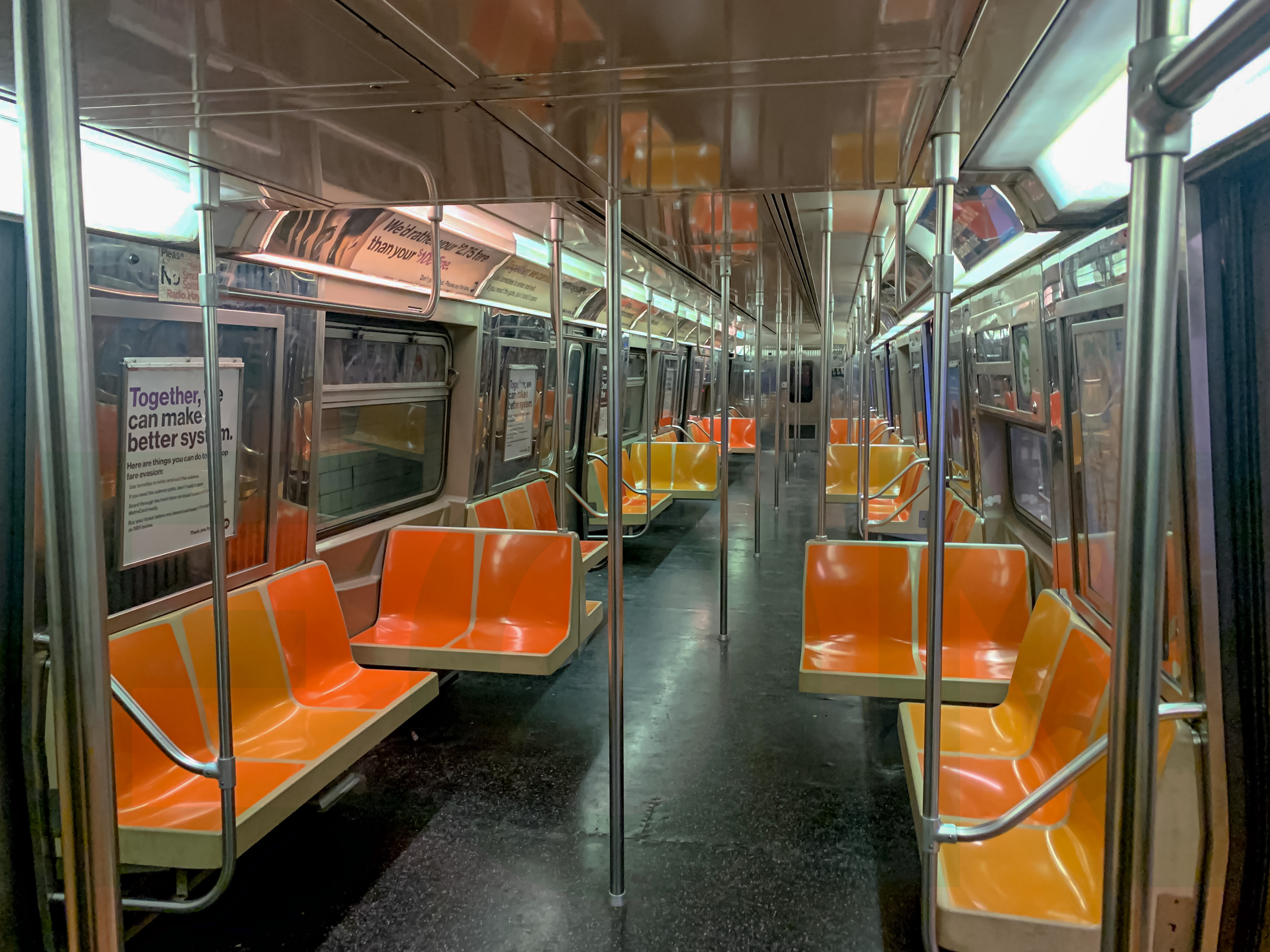
- Interior of an R68 car
- Stock type: Electric multiple unit
- In service: April 13, 1986 – present (40 years)
- Manufacturers: Westinghouse-Amrail Company (aka Francorail): Westinghouse, ANF Industrie (all cars); Jeumont Schneider (2500–2724); Alstom (2725–2924)
- Built at: Crespin, France (final assembly: New York Harbor, US)
- Family name: SMEE
- Replaced: Most R10s, R27s, and R30s; All remaining R16s
- Constructed: 1985–1988
- Entered service: April 13, 1986 (revenue service testing); June 20, 1986 (official service)
- Number built: 425
- Number in service: 421
- Successor: R211; R268
- Formation: 2500–2915 (416 cars) are linked into 4 car units; 2916–2924 (9 cars) remain as single units with OPTO switches added
- Fleet numbers: 2500–2924
- Capacity: 70 (seated)
- Operator: New York City Subway
- Depots: Concourse Yard (188 cars); Coney Island Yard (233 cars)
- Services assigned: (Updated June 30, 2024)

Specifications
- Car body construction: Stainless steel with fiberglass end bonnets
- Train length: 2 car train: 150 feet (46 m); 4 car train: 300 feet (91 m); 8 car train: 600 feet (180 m)
- Car length: 74 ft 8.5 in (22.77 m) (over anticlimbers)
- Width: 10 ft (3,048 mm) (over threshold)
- Height: 12.08 ft (3,682 mm)
- Platform height: 3.76 ft (1.15 m)
- Doors: 8 sets of 50 inch wide side doors per car
- Maximum speed: 55 mph (89 km/h)
- Weight: 92,720 lb (42,057 kilograms)
- Traction system: E-Cam control (Adtranz)
- Traction motors: 115 hp (85.8 kW) 1447J DC motor (Westinghouse)
- Acceleration: 2.5 mph/s (4.0 km/(h⋅s))
- Deceleration: 3.0 mph/s (4.8 km/(h⋅s)) (full service); 3.2 mph/s (5.1 km/(h⋅s)) (emergency)
- Electric systems: Third rail, 625 V DC
- Current collection: Contact shoe
- Braking systems: New York Air Braking (NYAB) GSX23 Newtran "SMEE" braking system, NYAB tread brake rigging model TBU190
- Safety systems: dead man's switch, tripcock
- Coupling system: Westinghouse H2C
- Headlight type: halogen light bulbs
- Track gauge: 4 ft 8 1/2 in (1,435 mm) standard gauge

The R68 is a B Division New York City Subway car order consisting of 425 cars built by the Westinghouse-Amrail Company (aka Francorail), a joint venture of Westinghouse, ANF Industrie, Jeumont Schneider, and Alstom. The cars were built in Crespin, France from 1985 to 1988 and shipped through New York Harbor. Of the cars in the fleet, 416 are arranged in four-car sets while the other nine are single cars for the S Franklin Shuttle line in Brooklyn.

The R68 was the third R-type series consisting of 75-foot (22.86 m) cars. The first R68 train entered service on June 20, 1986. The R68's manufacturers suffered from significant system integration problems, and the fleet became known as a "lemon" in its early years, but its performance was improved following modifications by the New York City Transit Authority. In the 2010s, a small number of R68s received experimental upgrades.

== Description ==
The R68 was the third R-type contract to be built with 75-foot (22.86 m) cars (the previous two being the R44 and R46), which have more room for sitting and standing passengers per car than the 60-foot (18.29 m) cars that were used previously and afterward. Like the R44s and R46s, which are also 75 feet (22.86 m) long, they are prohibited from running on the BMT Eastern Division lines (J, L, M & Z trains) because of tight curves. This order was evolved from the R55, a proposed car that was considered in the early 1980s, but never left the drawing board, or purchased due to a lack of funding. Instead, more attention was paid to replacing the R12, R14, R15, and R17 fleets of the A Division, which were over 30 years old and worn-out at the time.

The cars, numbered 2500–2924, cost about $1 million each. They replaced many R10s dating from 1948, all remaining 6300-series R16s dating from 1954 to 1955, and some R27s and R30s dating from 1960 to 1962. The cars are built with stainless steel, and are graffiti-resistant.

The R68s are currently based in the Concourse Yard in the Bronx (cars 2500–2783) and the Coney Island Complex in Brooklyn (cars 2784–2924). The Concourse sets are currently assigned to the D, while most Coney Island sets are currently assigned to the B, N, Q, and W, and cars 2916–2924 are assigned to the Franklin Avenue Shuttle. As built, the R68s were originally single units, with a full-width cab on one end and a half-width cab on the other end. The R68s on the shuttle remain as single units with OPTO switches added, while the rest of the fleet were reconfigured into sets of four.

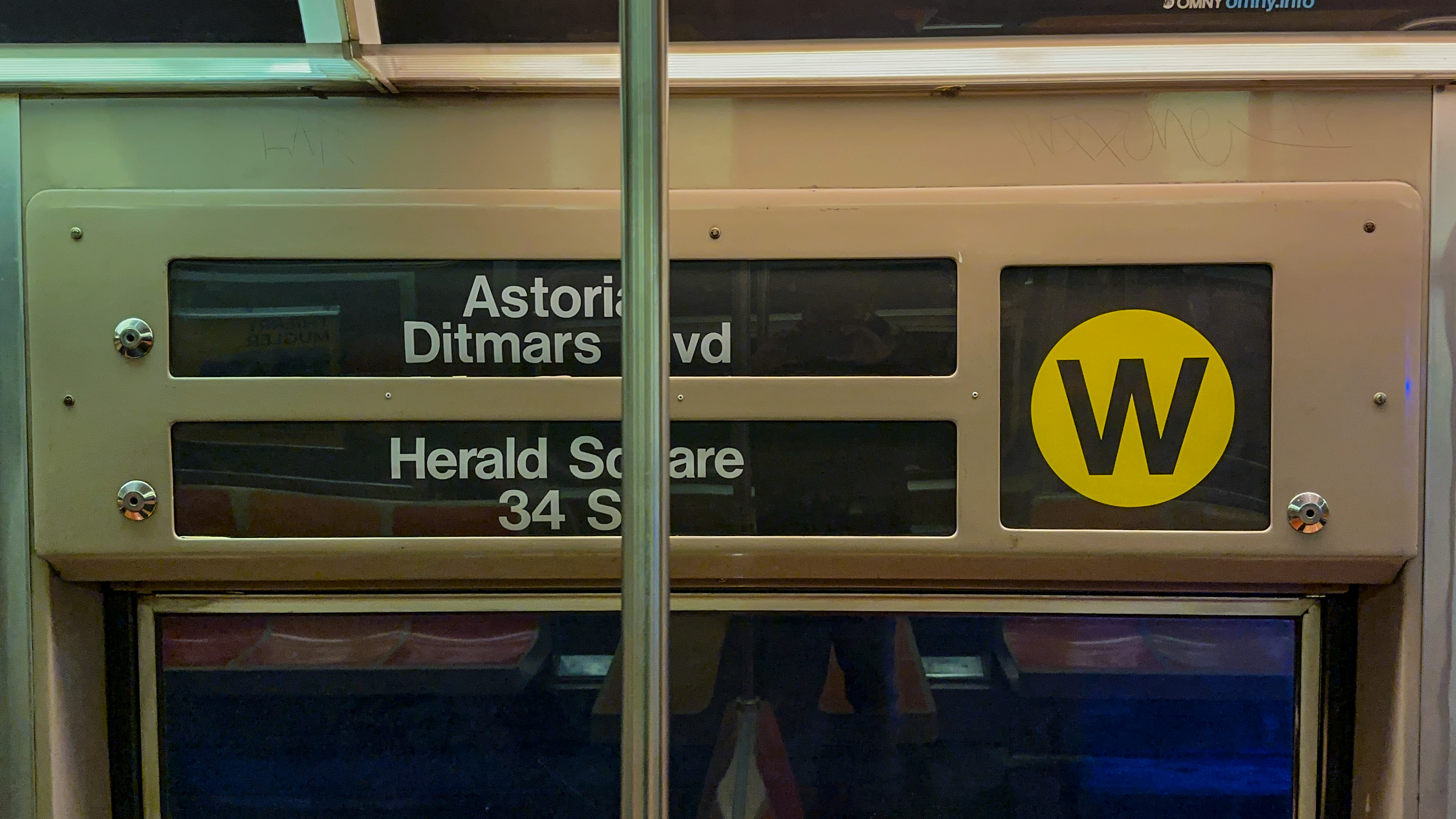
The interior side route & destination rollsign on an R68

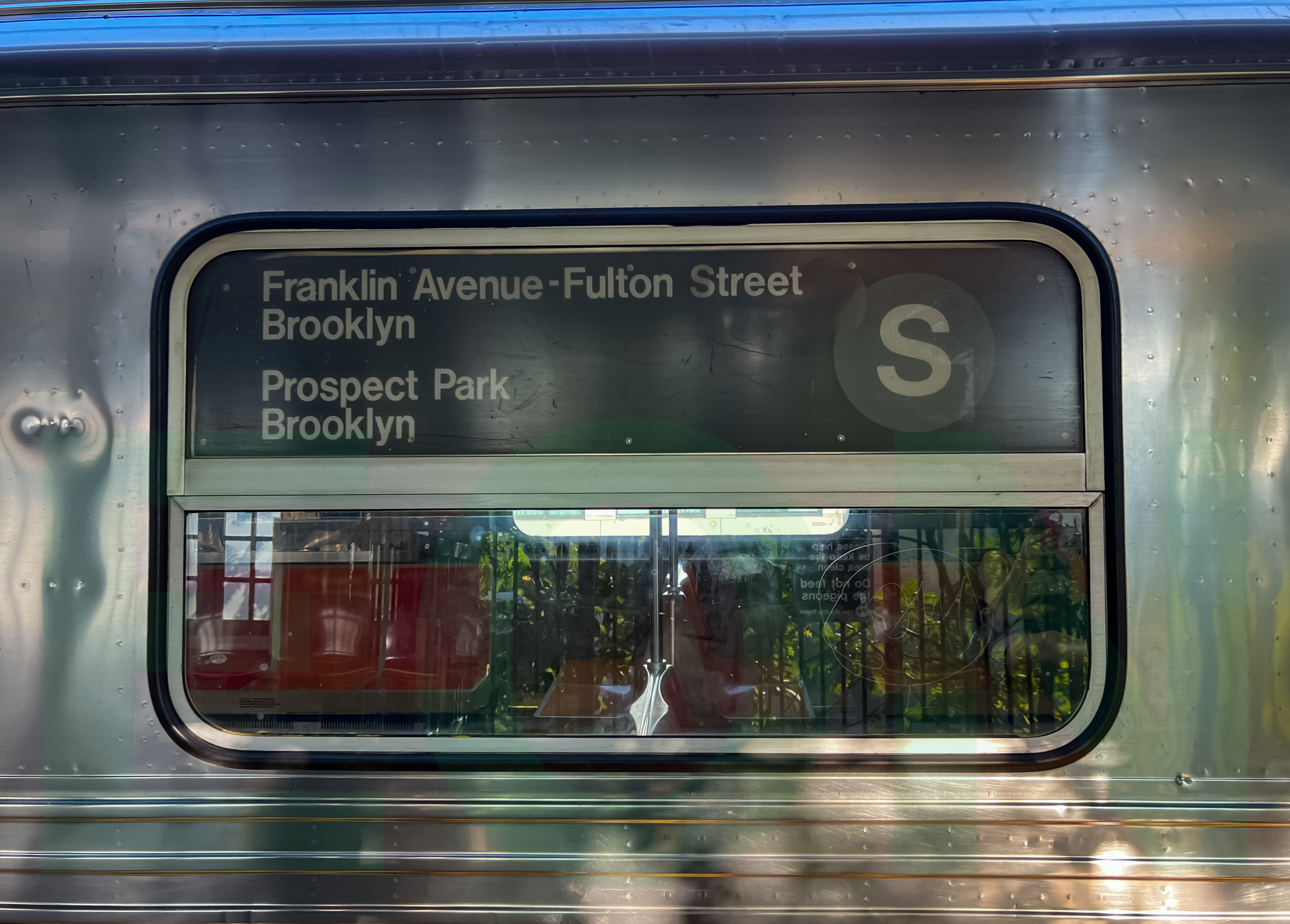
Exterior fixed side signage dedicated to the Franklin Avenue Shuttle

== History ==
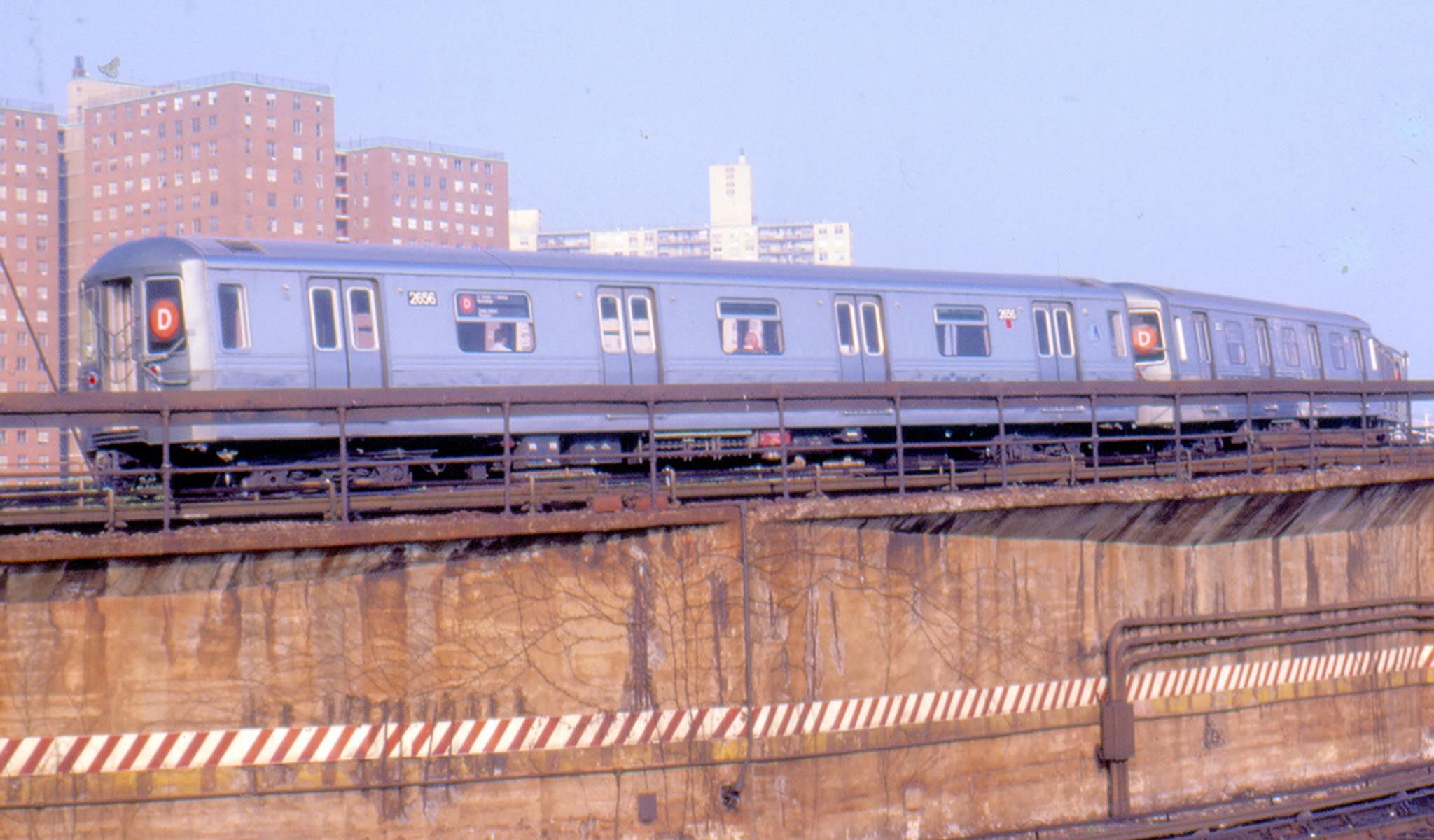
R68s in service on the D in 1987

Initially, the R68 contract was assigned to the rehabilitation and modernization of the R10 and R16 fleets. Car 6429, an R16, was rebuilt as a prototype for the potential R68 car class. However, on October 15, 1982, the Metropolitan Transportation Authority announced that they would purchase 225 new cars from Westinghouse-Amrail under the R68 contract; the R16 prototype was scrapped by February 1985. The new cars were built in Crespin, France from 1985 to 1988 and shipped through New York Harbor. The first of the 225 cars were initially scheduled to arrive in January 1985, with the entire order complete in May 1986. The projected cost of the order was $210 million, or about $933,000 per car.

The delivery of the first R68 was made on February 4, 1986, but it failed to pass a sharp curve on the South Brooklyn Railway trackage on 38th Street in Brooklyn, and as a result, the curve had to be rebuilt and the radius eased somewhat, and the delivery took place on February 26, 1986. The 30-day acceptance test for the R68s began on the Brighton Line on April 13, 1986. The R68s' first entry to revenue service was on June 20, 1986, on the Brooklyn half of the divided D train with the first fleet consisting of cars 2500–2507. There were two contracts to supply the R68 fleet. The primary order consisted of cars 2500–2724, while the option order consisted of cars 2725–2924. The R68, therefore, became the first subway fleet to have an option order.

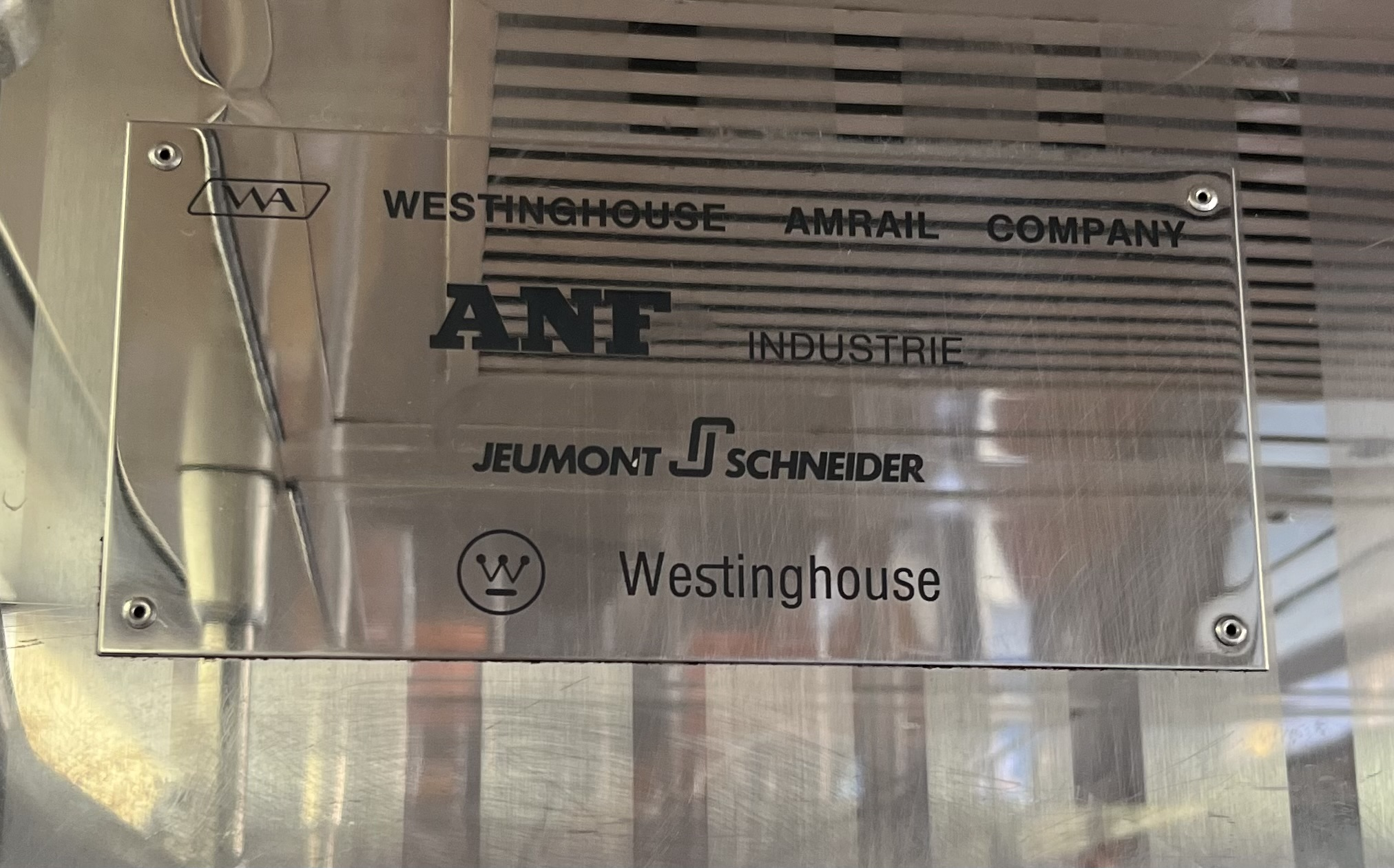
Builders plate of the Jeumont R68s

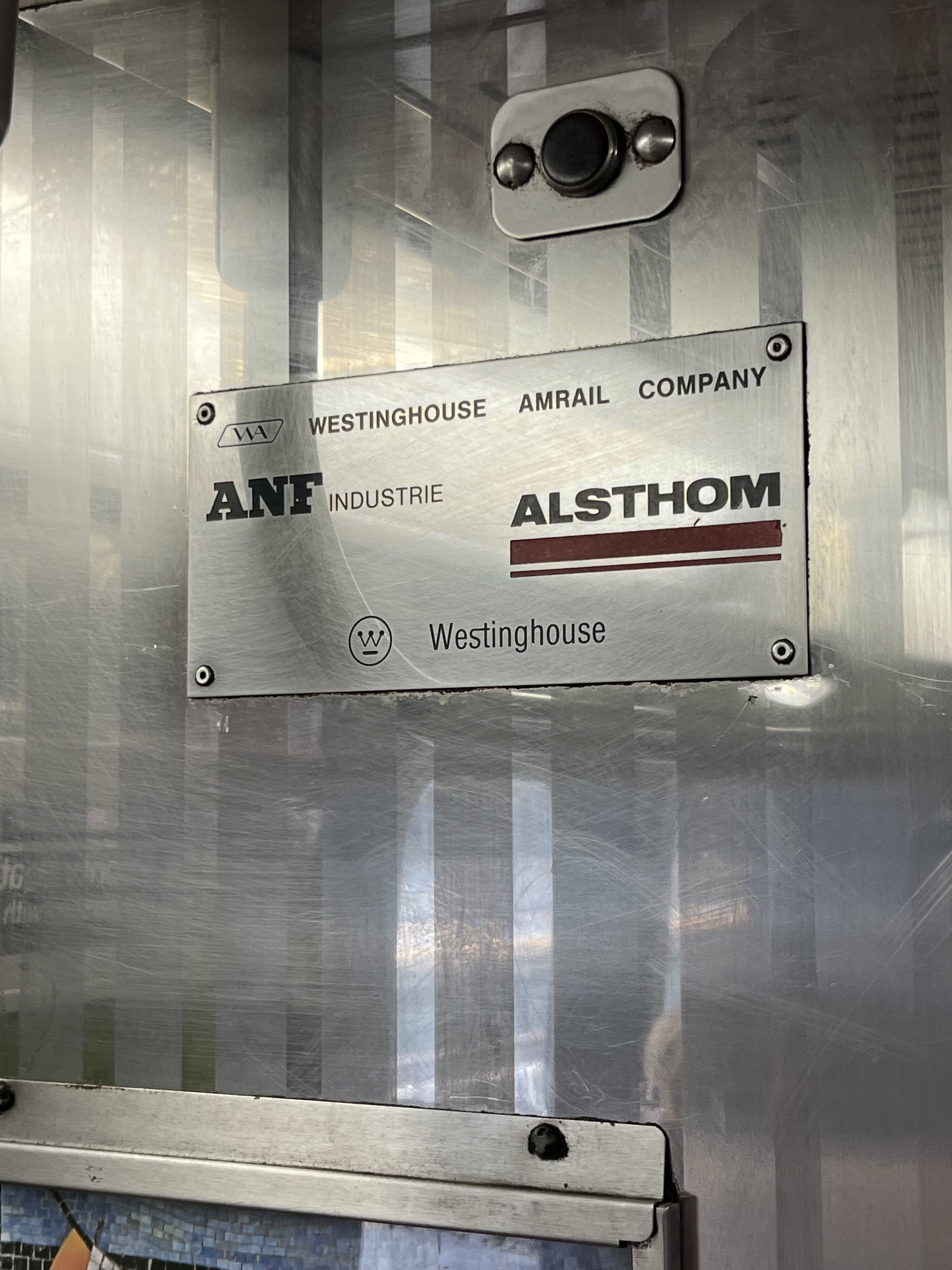
Builders plate of the Alstom R68s

=== Initial problems ===
The R68's manufacturers suffered from significant system integration problems. Poor communication and coordination between the car body builder (ANF Industrie) and the chassis assembler (Westinghouse) led to operational failures. Due to this, the R68s became known as a "lemon". During the beginning of service, the R68s had problems with malfunctioning doors, faulty wiring, electrical controls that suddenly lost power, and malfunctioning air brakes. In addition, the fleet had a high breakdown rate. Another problem occurred on November 11, 1986, when a train of R68s failed to climb the normal grade on the Manhattan Bridge. The fleet had a Mean Distance Between Failure of 12,362 miles by the end of 1986—slightly above the system's average, but far less than the MDBF figures for the R62 and R62A fleets. By April 1987, the MTA's manager of car equipment engineering estimated that 20 percent of the R68 fleet had faulty controllers (which controlled braking and acceleration). Extensive work performed by the New York City Transit Authority provided solutions to the fleet's many problems.

The MTA was given a second option order of an additional 200 subway cars from Westinghouse-Amrail. However, due to problems from the manufacturer, the MTA awarded it to Kawasaki. Westinghouse-Amrail offered to have the 200 cars built for $1,012,000 each, while Kawasaki agreed to have them built for $958,000 per car. This order became the R68A.

=== Equipment tests ===
In 2010, the MTA proposed mid-life technological upgrades for the R68s, including LED destination signs and automated announcements. These upgrades were not implemented.

In the 2010s, several cars which ran on the G received interior upgrades. LED lights were tested on cars 2860–2867. LED lights, door chimes (similar to those on the R142, R142A, and R179), and PA systems were tested on 2892–2895. Public Address and Intercom, LED displays, LCD displays, and CCTV, as well as Train Operator displays, were tested on cars 2844 and 2846. Display screens were tested on cars 2804–2807. LED lights and surveillance cameras were tested on 2792–2795. Each program gave out the date and time, but none of the displays indicated the next stops along the routes. All upgrades were later removed, and no further upgrades were implemented until early 2021, when car 2860 received a newer LED signage and CCTV system from Suzhou Huaqi Intelligent Technology. The entire consist was pulled from service on April 22, 2021, due to concerns over Suzhou Huaqi's ties to the Chinese government. It is unlikely that further technological improvements will be implemented in the near future.

=== Replacement ===
The R68s are scheduled to remain in service until at least 2027–2032.

In June 2023, the MTA released a document advertising an RFP for the R262 and R268 models, the latter of which is likely to replace the R68 and R68A. In September 2024, the MTA further indicated that a handful of R68 and R68A cars would be retired by R211 cars. The MTA also wanted to replace the rest of the R68 and R68A fleet with 355 new 60-foot-long (18 m) cars, thereby retiring the last remaining 75-foot-long (23 m) cars in the New York City Subway system's revenue fleet. Upon the announcement of the second R211 option order in December 2024, it was confirmed that some R68s would be replaced by the second option order.

== See also ==
- R68A (New York City Subway car), the second order

== Notes and references ==
=== Further reading ===
- Sansone, Gene. Evolution of New York City subways: An illustrated history of New York City's transit cars, 1867-1997. New York Transit Museum Press, New York, 1997 ISBN 978-0-9637492-8-4
