= R16 (New York City Subway car) =

Retired class of New York City Subway car

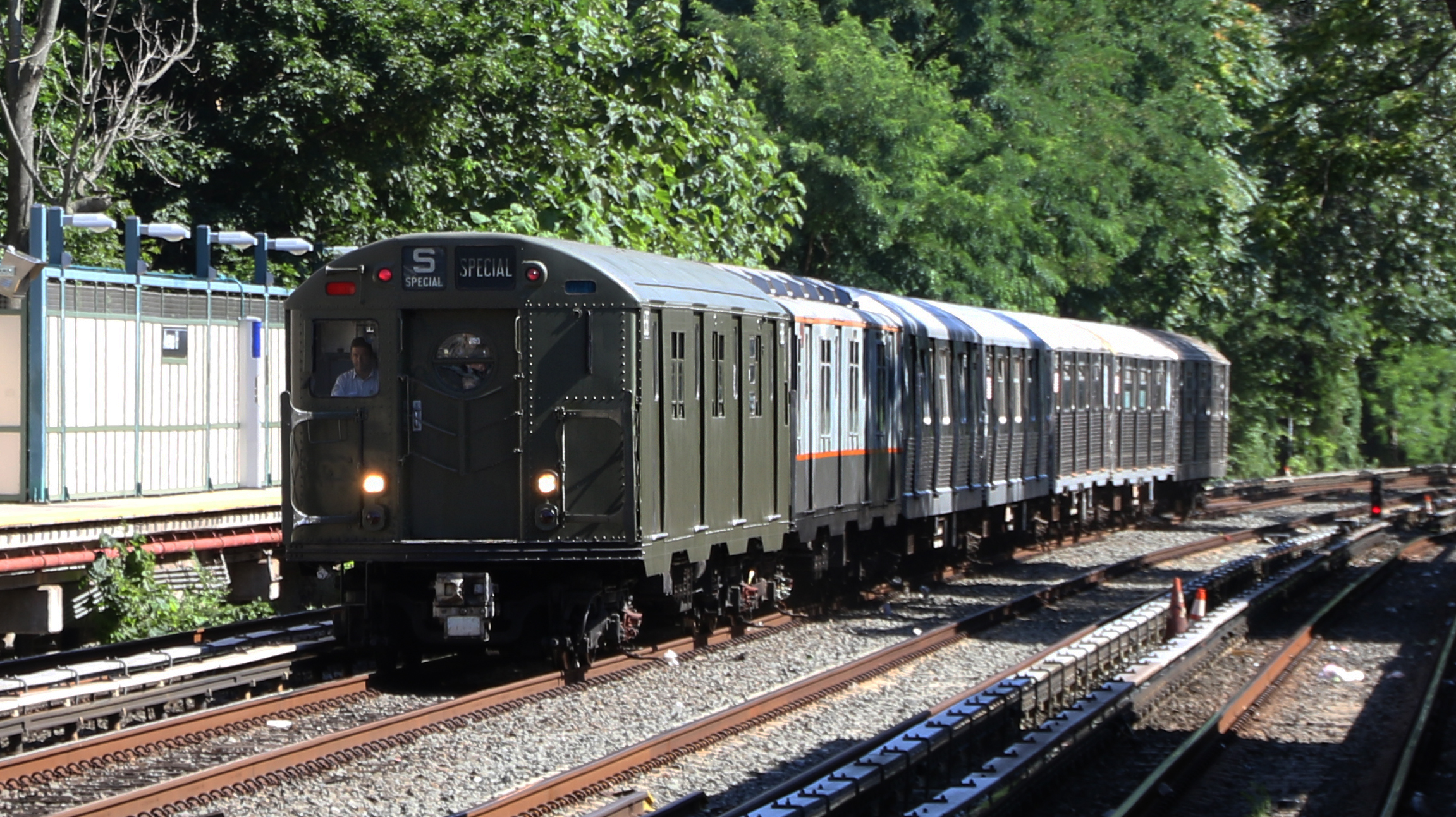
- R16 car 6387 bypassing Avenue H station on the Train of Many Metals

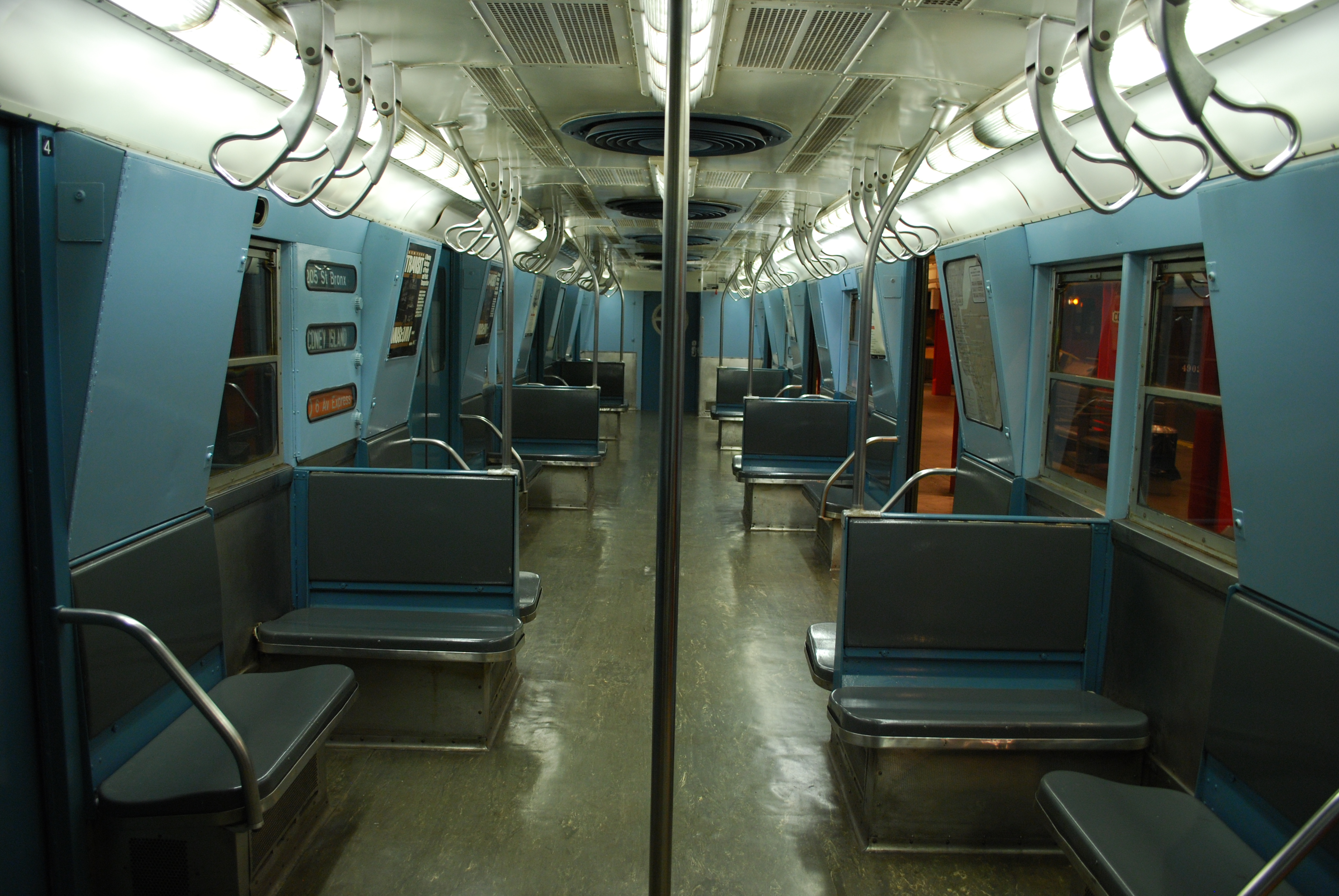
- Interior view of R16 car 6387
- In service: January 10, 1955 – July 3, 1987 (32 years)
- Manufacturers: American Car and Foundry, USA
- Replaced: BMT Zephyr; BMT Bluebird compartment cars
- Constructed: 1954–1955
- Entered service: January 10, 1955
- Scrapped: 1983 (6400–6499); 1987 (6300–6399)
- Number built: 200
- Number preserved: 4
- Number scrapped: 196
- Successor: R46 and R68
- Formation: Single unit cars
- Fleet numbers: 6300–6499
- Capacity: 70 (seated) 10 (standing)
- Operator: New York City Transit Authority

Specifications
- Car body construction: LAHT carbon steel
- Car length: 60 ft (18.29 m)
- Width: 10 ft (3.05 m)
- Height: 12.08 ft (3.68 m)
- Platform height: 3.76 ft (1.15 m)
- Doors: 8 sets of 50 inch wide side doors per car
- Maximum speed: 55 mph (89 km/h)
- Weight: GE cars (6400–6499) 84,532 lb (38,343 kg), WH cars (6300–6399) 86,270 lb (39,131 kg)
- Traction system: Westinghouse 1447C; GE 1240A4; Westinghouse UPC631A; GE MCM 17KG113D1
- Power output: 100 hp (75 kW) / 4 per car
- Acceleration: 2.5 mph/s (4.0 km/(h⋅s)) (?)
- Electric systems: Third rail, 600 V DC
- Current collection: Contact shoe
- Braking system: WABCO ME42 SMEE
- Track gauge: 4 ft 8 1/2 in (1,435 mm) standard gauge

The R16 was a New York City Subway car model built by the American Car and Foundry Company from 1954 to 1955 for the IND/BMT B Division. A total of 200 cars were built, arranged as single units. Two versions were manufactured: Westinghouse (WH)-powered cars and General Electric (GE)-powered cars.

The first R16s entered service on January 10, 1955. Various modifications were made over the years to the R16 fleet. The GE-powered cars were found to be less reliable than the WH-powered cars, so the New York City Transit Authority planned to retire them early in 1977 with R46s. However, problems with R46 cars kept the GE-powered R16s in service until 1983. The WH-powered R16s were retired in 1987 with the delivery of the R68s. Some R16 cars were saved for various purposes, but most were scrapped.

== Description ==
The R16s were numbered 6300–6499. When delivered, the R16s quickly became the new standard in car design for the New York City Transit Authority. Structurally and mechanically, they were the larger versions of the R15s and the R17s, and basically an improved version of the R10s, sharing the same exact dimensions. The only exception was that the R16s had electrically operated door motors while the R10s had air-powered door motors. When they were new, the R16s could give the R10 some competition when it came to speed – both cars were mechanically similar with four 100 horsepower (75 kW) motors and a balancing speed of 55 mph (89 km/h).

The R16s, like the older R1–9 fleet, R10s, and R11s, featured three sets of mid-car body passenger windows on each side. One set contained an illuminated rollsign box in lieu of a second window. This sign box had three readings arranged vertically – the top two being the train's terminals, and the bottom being the route. This window and signbox pattern became standard for later cars until the R40s in 1967. The R16 would also be the last car class delivered with crosswise seating until the R44 order in 1971.

There were two versions of the R16: Westinghouse (WH)-powered cars (6300–6399) and General Electric (GE)-powered cars (6400–6499), the latter of which were delivered earlier. The GE-powered cars used forced air to cool the rheostatic resistors used for acceleration and dynamic braking. However, the low voltage rotary converter (motor-generator) used to provide the air proved to be problematic as the enclosure tended to trap dirt and rainwater within. In addition, the master controllers also had a tendency to short out more frequently relative to other classes, leading to high failure rates. Meanwhile, the Westinghouse-powered cars had resistors mounted in the open for slipstream cooling as had been the traditional means; this setup was found to be more reliable and was reused in newer cars up to the R22 order. In theory, both types of R16s could be run together, but in practice, this was found to be less than desirable, so cars would be segregated by electrical running gear to provide better fleet reliability. The R16s were also the heaviest 60-foot (18.29 m) subway car built at the time, weighing in at some 85,000 pounds (39,000 kg) per car, until the 75-foot (22.86 m) cars, which weighed around 89,000 pounds (40,000 kg) per car, eclipsed them.

== History ==
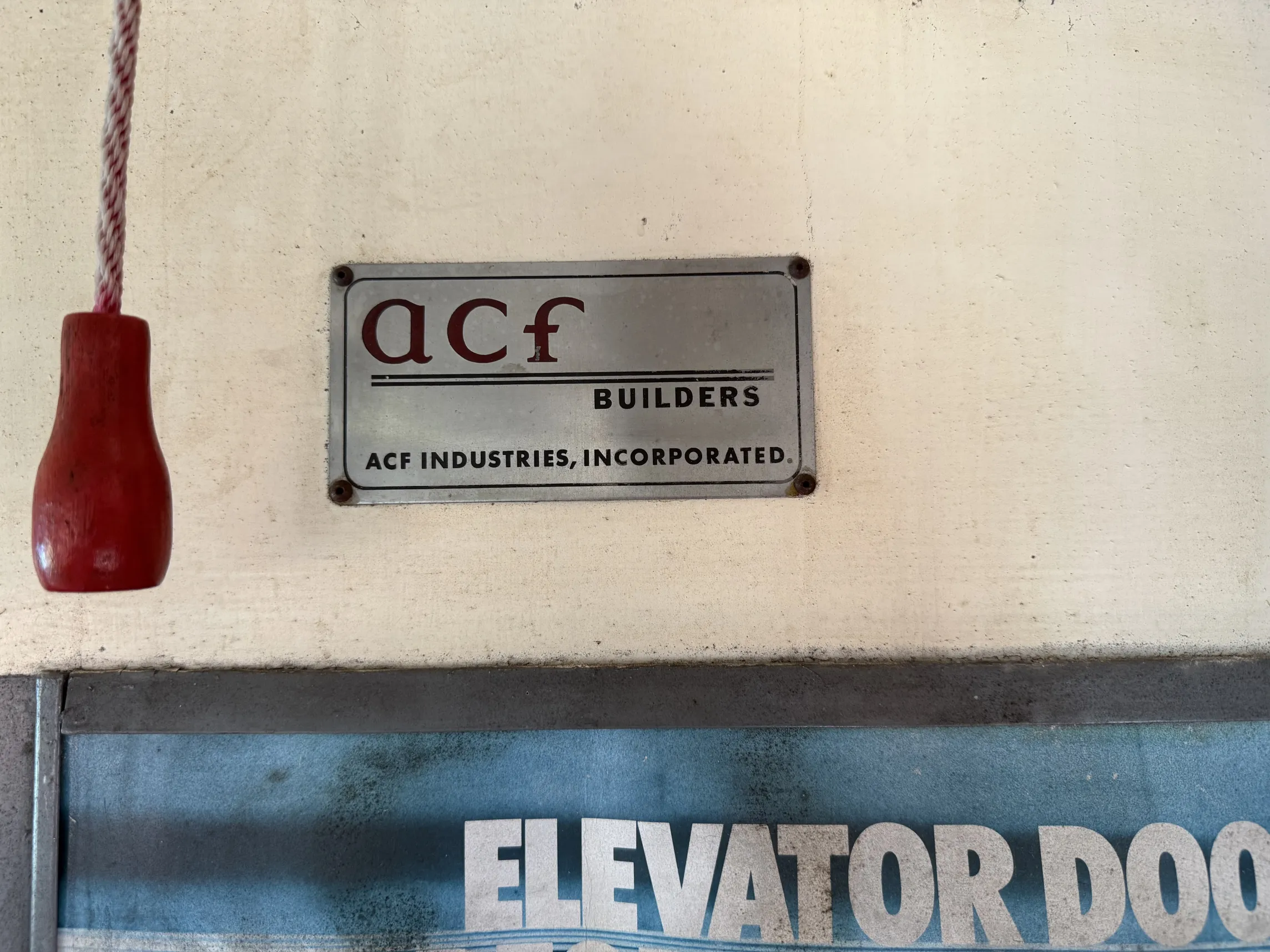
Builders plate of the R16s

The R16s were delivered between 1954 and 1955 in dark olive green paint scheme and first placed into passenger service on January 10, 1955, on the BMT #15, (now J). Two cars #s, 6318 and 6463, were painted gold for the golden jubilee celebration in 1955.

R16s 6300–6349 were transferred to the A in preparation for the opening of the former Long Island Rail Road's IND Rockaway Line on June 28, 1956, as the Transit Authority wished to use its newest equipment available for the line's inaugural. After the late 1950s, the cars were returned to the BMT Eastern Division and would remain there until the late 1960s and the early 1970s, when they were transferred to various lines throughout the system. During the 1970s, R16s could be found intermixed with other cars and in far away places from their previous running grounds. Photos of R16s in the Bronx or Queens show them both in complete consists as well as with other fleets.

In 1968, many cars were repainted into a bright red scheme. The whole R16 fleet was given the new MTA corporate silver and blue scheme in 1970, and the cars kept that scheme until retirement.

During the early 1970s, the R16s had their door motors replaced with door motors similar to those used by the R44s. As the replacement door motors were mounted in the walls rather than under the seats, distinctive sloping wall panels (unique to the R16s) appeared.

Car 6429 was rebuilt as a prototype in an effort to rehabilitate and modernize the R10 and R16 fleets. These rebuilds would have taken place under the R68 contract. The prototype was scrapped by February 1985; the R68 contract was reassigned to the purchase of 225 new subway cars by Westinghouse-Amrail.

=== Retirement ===
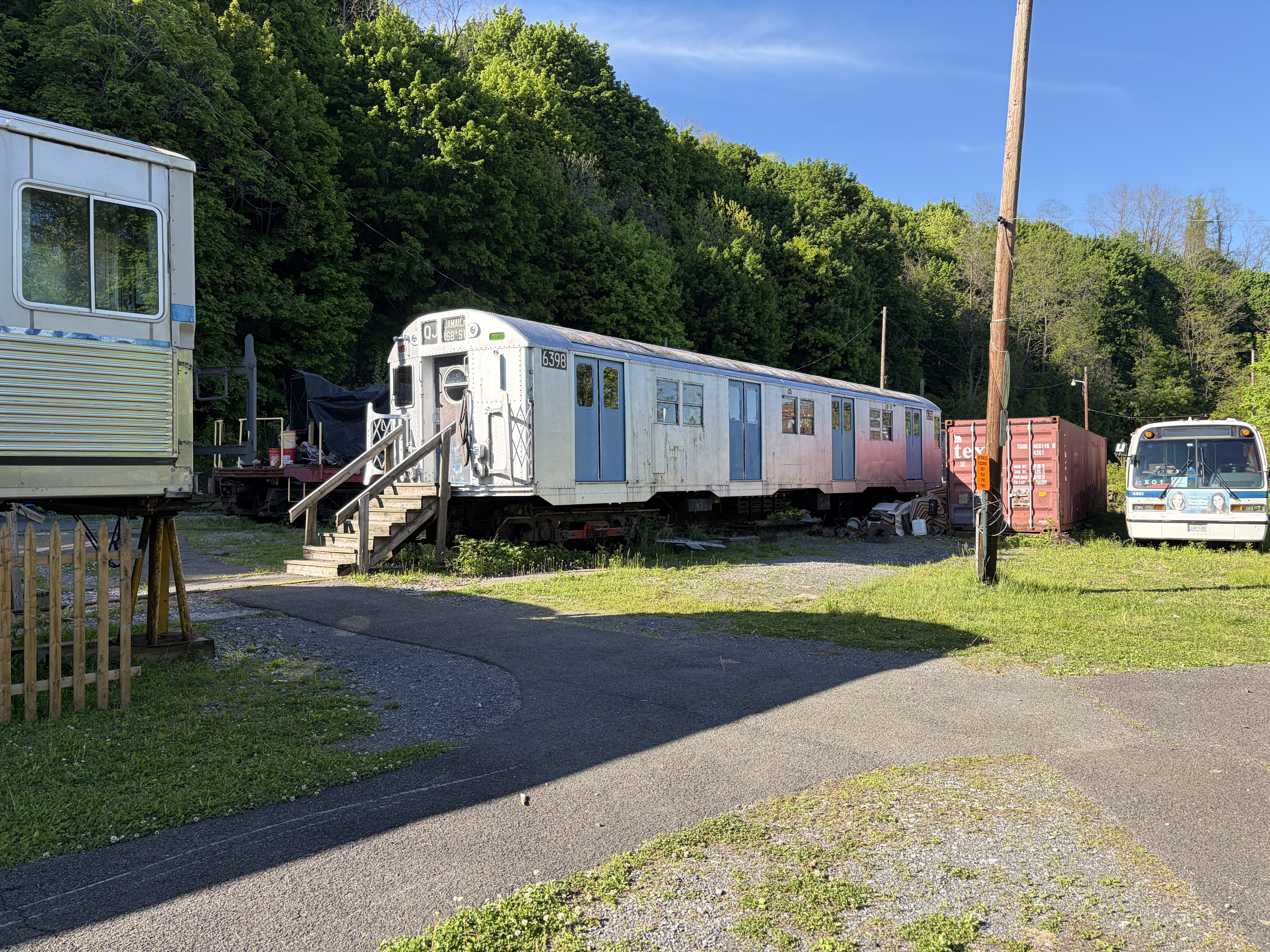
R16 car 6398 at the Trolley Museum of New York in May 2026

Because of persistent electrical issues with the GE-powered R16s, the Transit Authority planned to retire them early in 1977 with the R46s. However, problems with R46 cars due to cracks found in those cars' trucks (as well as a host of other defects) kept the GE-powered R16s in service until 1983. The more reliable WH-powered R16 cars remained in service on the J and M lines until July 3, 1987, when they were ultimately replaced with the R68s.

After retirement, four cars were saved for various purposes. The full list includes:

- 6305 and 6339 – currently stored at the MTA NYC Transit's Coney Island Complex in Brooklyn.
- 6387 – preserved by the New York Transit Museum. The car was restored to operating status in 2013–2014 and has been operating on New York City Transit Museum-sponsored excursions since August 2014, specifically on the Train of Many Metals (TOMM).
- 6398 – preserved at the Trolley Museum of New York, Kingston, NY, restoration in progress. It is occasionally used during special events pulled by other cars or locomotive.

6452 was located at PS 248 (an NYCT training facility) in Brooklyn until July 2004, as a training car. It was painted in the "Redbird" scheme and was not operational. In July 2004, the car was moved to Linden Yard in Brooklyn and was replaced by R110B 3005, which was moved to the facility. 6452 was moved again to the Coney Island Yard in 2005. Finally, in July 2007, the car was moved to the SBK yard for asbestos abatement and sent to the 207th Street Yard for reefing in early 2008.

== In popular culture ==
Various R16s were featured in the 1981 made-for-TV film We're Fighting Back, including the interior of some R16s. Several of them included 6301, 6302, 6321, 6333, 6355, 6394, 6398, and 6399, signed up as an L train. Various stations were renamed in the film, but there are various hints, including the fact it was a solid 8-car set of R16s rather than a 10-car set that it was filmed on the BMT Canarsie Line.

A wooden mockup of an R16 subway car was featured in the 1976 remake of King Kong.

In the 1959 film Imitation of Life, several trains consisting of R16s can be seen passing outside the studio window in the flea powder ad scene.
