= Train of Many Metals =

New York City Subway excursion train

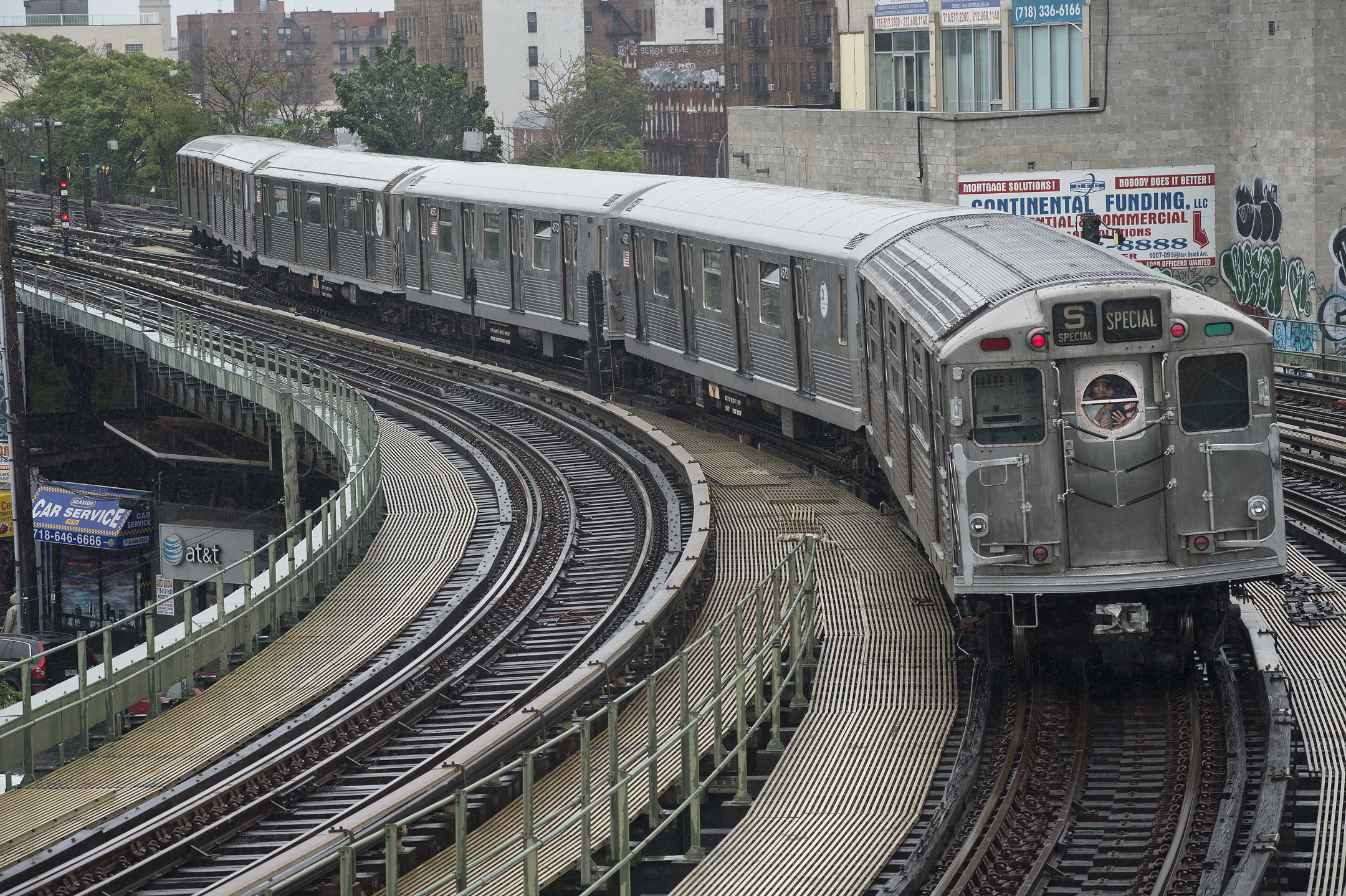
The Train of Many Metals departing Brighton Beach on a fan trip, with R11 8013 trailing, taken in June 2015.

The Train of Many Metals (also referred to as TOMM) is one of the New York Transit Museum's nostalgia trains used for B Division excursions. The name refers to most of the cars that were preserved being constructed from steel, and in reference to the Train of Many Colors.

The train made its first run in August 2014, when some of the cars were used on an excursion to The Rockaways as part of celebrating the restoration of service on the IND Rockaway Line. In general, cars may be used to commemorate a special occasion.

Some of the cars are housed in the New York Transit Museum when not used for excursions. Others are stored at the 207th Street Yard.

== List of cars and colors ==
Model	Builder	Car numbers	Livery	Era used
R10	American Car & Foundry	3184	Two tone gray with orange stripes	Original, when new
R10	American Car & Foundry	3189	Aqua blue, white	1965 to 1970
R11	Budd	8013	Blank, stainless steel	1964 to 1977
R16	American Car & Foundry	6387	Olive green	1954 to 1968
R38	St. Louis Car	4028–4029	Blank, stainless steel	1987 to 2009
R40	St. Louis Car	4280–4281	Blank, stainless steel	1986 to 2009
R42	St. Louis Car	4572–4573	Blank, stainless steel	1988 to 2020
