= R10 (New York City Subway car) =

Retired class of New York City Subway car

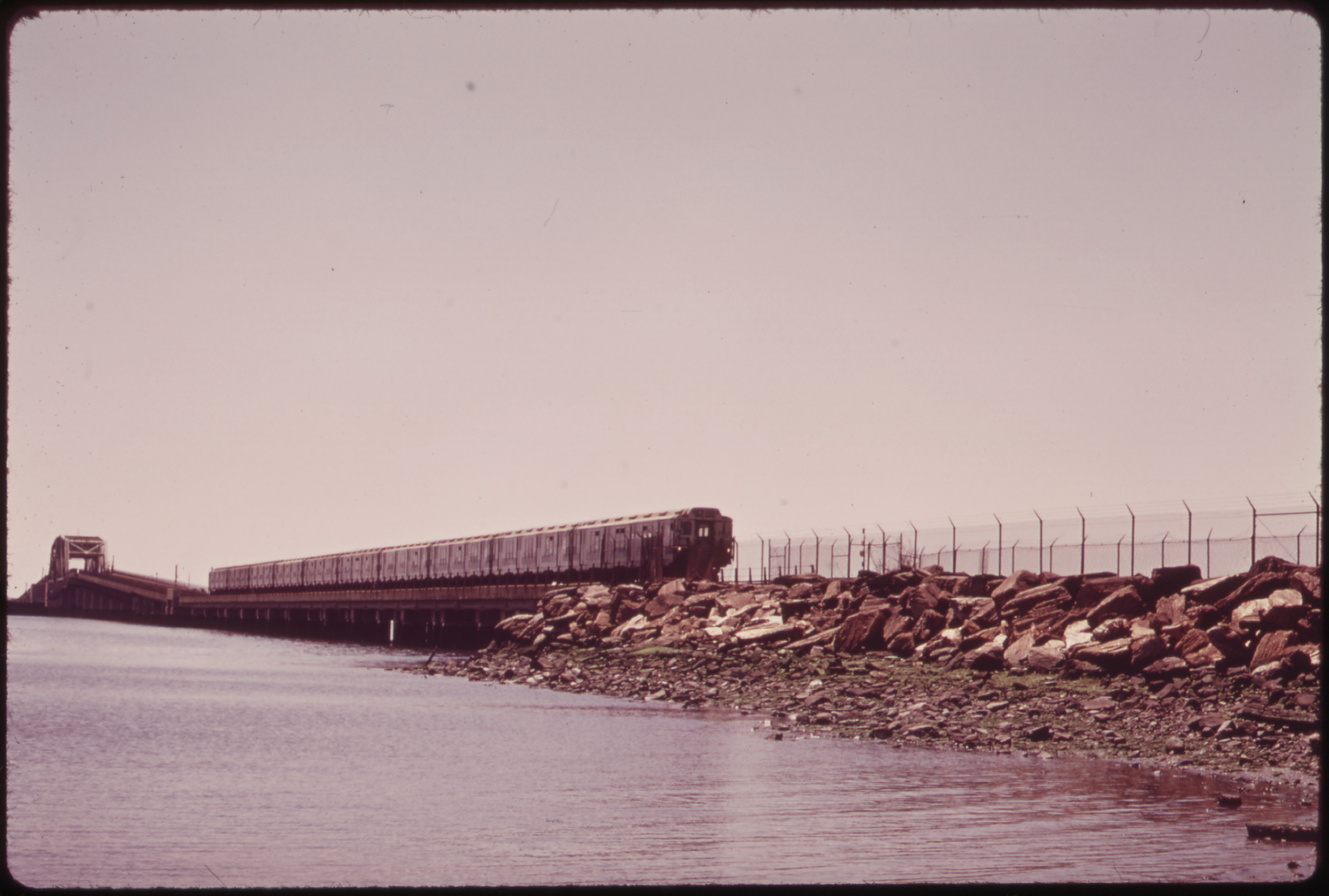
- R10s in service on the A in 1973

- Interior of an R10 car in 1988
- In service: November 20, 1948 – September 8, 1989 (40 years)
- Manufacturer: American Car & Foundry
- Constructed: 1948–1949
- Entered service: November 20, 1948
- Refurbished: 1985–1986
- Scrapped: 1983–1984, 1988–1993
- Number built: 400
- Number preserved: 2
- Number scrapped: 398
- Successor: R46; R68; R68A
- Formation: Single units
- Fleet numbers: 1948–1970: 1803–1852 and 3000–3349; 1970–1989: 2950–2974, 3000–3049, 3100–3224 (WH); 2975–2999, 3050–3099, 3225–3349 (GE)
- Capacity: 56 (seated)
- Operators: NYC Board of Transportation; New York City Transit Authority

Specifications
- Car body construction: LAHT Carbon steel
- Car length: 60.3 ft (18.38 m)
- Width: 10 ft (3.05 m)
- Height: 12.2 ft (3.72 m)
- Platform height: 3.76 ft (1.15 m)
- Doors: 8 sets of 50 inch wide side doors per car
- Maximum speed: 55 mph (89 km/h)
- Weight: 81,200 lb (36,832 kg)
- Traction system: General Electric cars: GE PCM type 17KG116A switch group, with 17KC76A1 master controller, using GE 1240-A3 motors (100 hp or 75 kW each). All four axles motorized. Westinghouse cars: WH ABS type UP-631-A switch group, with XM-179 master controller, using Westinghouse 1447-A motors (100 hp (75 kW) each). All four axles motorized.
- Power output: 100 hp (75 kW) per traction motor
- Acceleration: 2.5 mph/s (4.0 km/(h⋅s))
- Auxiliaries: Edison B4H (32 Volt) battery with 24 cells.
- Electric systems: 600 V DC third rail
- Current collection: Top running Contact shoe
- Braking system: WABCO SMEE Braking System
- Coupling system: WABCO H2C
- Track gauge: 4 ft 8 1/2 in (1,435 mm) standard gauge

The R10 was a New York City Subway car model built by the American Car and Foundry Company from 1948 to 1949 for the IND/BMT B Division. A total of 400 cars were built, arranged as single units. Two versions were manufactured: Westinghouse (WH)-powered cars and General Electric (GE)-powered cars.

The R10 was the first series of post-war subway cars. They introduced many innovations, including an all-welded low-alloy high tensile (LAHT) steel construction, dynamic braking, improved propulsion, and various cosmetic features. The first of these entered service on November 20, 1948. Various modifications were made over the years to the R10 fleet, and 110 cars were lightly overhauled in 1985–1986. Some R10s were replaced by the R46s in the late 1970s; the remaining cars, despite having low reliability rates, outlasted several newer car classes. The remaining R10s were replaced by the R68s and R68As and last ran on October 29, 1989. Two cars have been preserved, while the rest were scrapped.

== Description ==
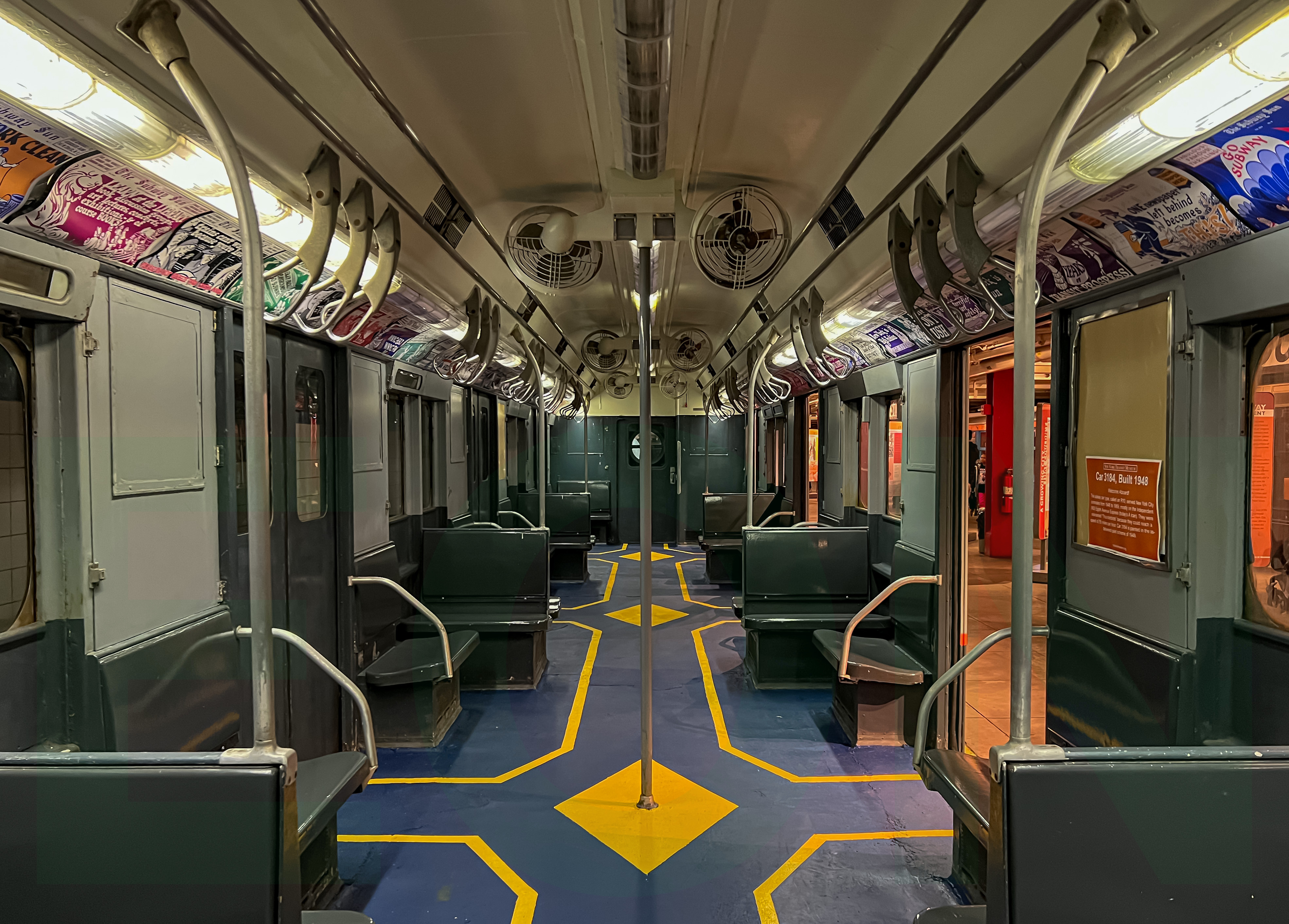
Interior view of R10 car 3184 in 2022

The R10s were originally numbered 1803–1852 and 3000–3349. Cars 1803–1852 were renumbered 2950–2999 in 1970.

As the first series of post-war subway cars, the R10s introduced many innovations. For the first time, the car body was of an all-welded low-alloy high tensile (LAHT) steel construction. This gave the body great strength, as the body and underframe were welded together to form a single, durable, and rigid car body, which had strong structural integrity. The R10s also featured a new type of braking system known as the "SMEE" schedule braking, which introduced dynamic braking. Dynamic braking reduced wear and tear on brake shoes, reducing maintenance costs. Improved propulsion, in the form of four 100 horsepower (75 kW) traction motors design, instead of the traditional two 190 hp (140 kW) motors (the setup used in the R1–9 fleet), improved acceleration from 1.75 miles per hour per second (2.82 km/(h⋅s)) to the current 2.5 mph/s (4.0 km/(h⋅s)). They also featured roofline side destination signs, an arrangement that drew criticism. The R10s were also the first subway cars to incorporate roller bearings, instead of the standard friction bearings found on all older railway stock, as well as being the last subway cars ordered with air-operated door engines. Additionally, the R10s were the first subway cars to be equipped with air horns, as opposed to the air whistles that were found on all pre-war subway cars. Finally, the cars introduced the General Steel Industries cast steel truck frame design also used on many passenger cars and coaches up until the R68As in 1988. Sealed beam headlights were installed on all cars of this class starting in 1956.

These cars were nicknamed "Thunderbirds" by their operating personnel and railfans because of the cars' high speeds.

Although they could operate in mixed consists of later SMEE cars, the R10s, for the most part, ran in solid consists throughout their careers. They were briefly mixed with fifty R16s assigned to the A in the late 1950s, and with the R42s assigned to the A during 1969–1970.

The R10s bore several paint schemes during their service lives. The cars were delivered in two-tone grey with orange stripes. In 1964, nine of these cars were painted red with black roofs and black skirts (1822, 1825, 1850, 3099, 3101, 3137, 3234, 3334, 3342). During the following year, two versions of the original paint scheme were tested, with 3037 in a lighter gray and 3218 in a darker gray. On car 3133, the orange painted-on stripe was replaced by an attached orange plastic strip along the sides of the car. From 1965–1966, they were repainted into an aqua blue/white scheme, directly replicating that of the World’s Fair R33s and R36s. The first car to be so painted, 3331, additionally sported a TA seal on the end. The following year, the fleet was redone in this scheme on this occasion without the extra aqua blue stripe. These cars variously had aqua blue roofs or white roofs; 19 of these cars received gray roofs and gray skirts. (Note: Their numbers can be found in the New York Division Bulletin published by the Electric Railroaders' Association.) Beginning in 1970, they were repainted into the MTA's silver with blue stripe scheme. Toward the end of their lives, 110 Westinghouse units that went under the GOH program were painted with a green body, a silver roof, and a black front hood.

The original interior paint scheme was blue and gray, conducted with various experiments of this nature. While 1848 was all blue inside, 3219 was painted with bright orange and blue around 1964. When the cars were painted with silver and blue outside, the interiors received a light gray and pale green paint scheme (on car 1806, which was 2953 by this time, a dark gray was used). At a later date, the original blue and gray scheme resumed being used once again. The rattan seats also received treatment on certain cars, with 3050 in green coloring, whereas 3210 in a bright blue color.

Other features to be noted were a pair of stainless steel doors that were tested on car 3119, ventilation louvres that were inserted into the side doors on car 3138, and three cross seats that were extended to permit seating by three people on car 3189. These were done during the 1970s.

The R10 was the last B-Division car to have seats that had thick strand woven cloths covering the entire seat.

== History ==
=== Pre-introduction ===
In 1947, following an accident in 1946, R7A car 1575 was rebuilt from its original appearance by ACF and became the prototype for the R10. The car was designed to test new interior and cosmetic features. After it was rebuilt, 1575 re-entered service on June 30, 1947; however, while it cosmetically resembled an R10, mechanically and electrically, it was still an R7A and could only operate with other pre-war IND R1–9 fleet cars.

=== Delivery and revenue service ===
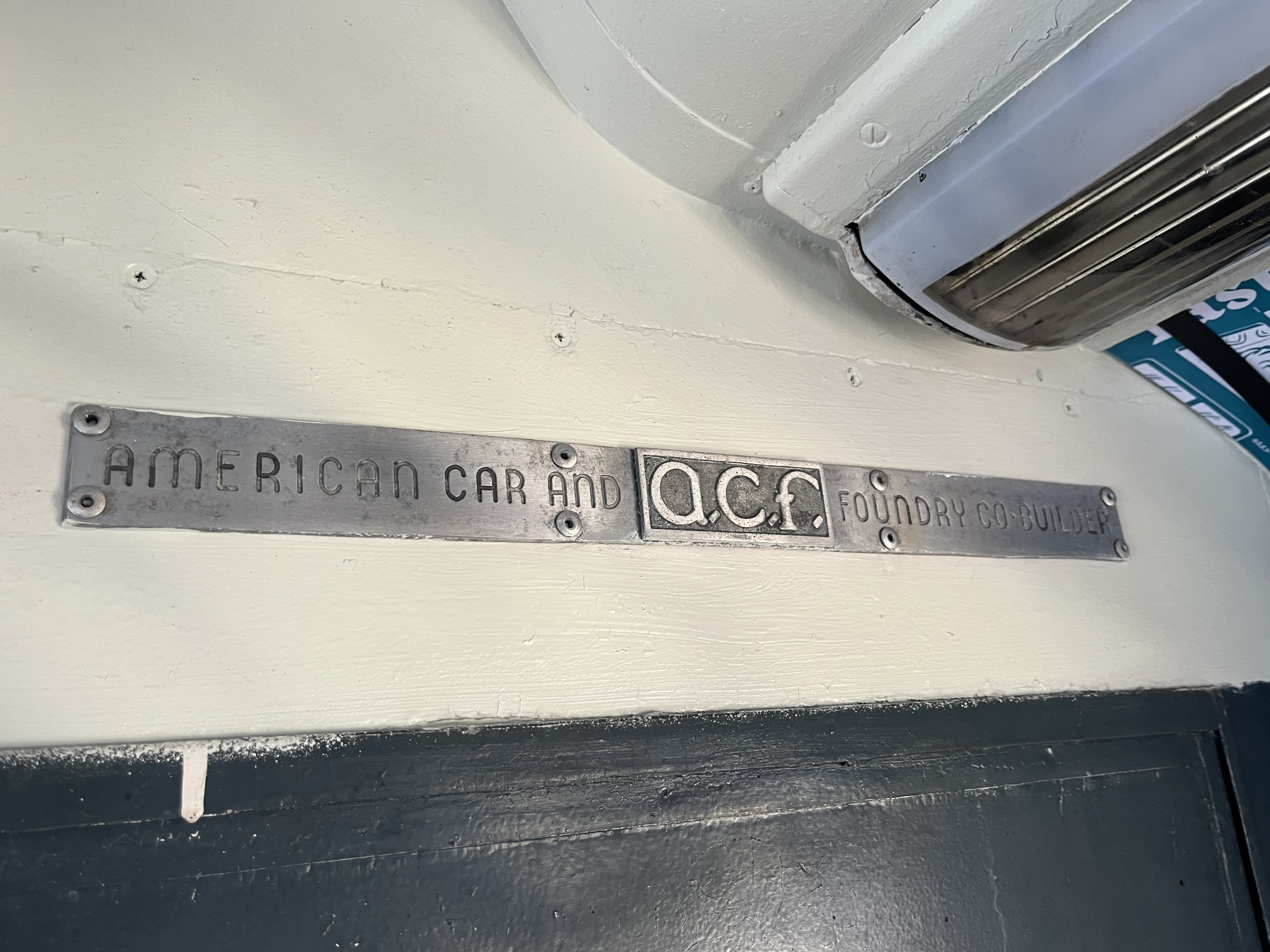
Builders plate of the R10 cars

The R10s first ran in service on the A route on November 20, 1948. They were initially the mainstay, and were exclusively assigned to this train, where they remained for almost 30 years, and became synonymous with that route for more than 20 years. During these early years, they made occasional appearances on the AA service (especially on weekends) and the rush hour BB service.

Thirty cars, numbered 3320–3349 were transferred to the BMT Eastern Division in 1954, and primarily used on Broadway–Jamaica service to help familiarize crews with SMEE equipment in anticipation of the arrival of the R16 cars, whereupon they were returned to normal IND service.

Then, some R10s were finally displaced from the A beginning in 1969, when brand new R42 cars, R44 cars, and displaced R40 cars were transferred from Jamaica Yard beginning on September 13, 1977 (which was, in turn, receiving brand new R46s were directly assigned to the A (so that the A train could be equipped with some air-conditioned cars). Many of these displaced R10s were then often used on the B and later, the rush hours-only CC (now the C). During 1978–1979, 2950–2999 were also transferred to Jamaica Yard for use on the GG (now the G Brooklyn/Queens Crosstown Local). Ultimately, the fleet was essentially assigned to the CC and GG service; however, during the R46 truck crisis, they needed to be placed back into regular A service as its R44s were moved to Jamaica Yard for service on the E, F, GG, and N. Many R10s were used for a few weeks on the D, then for a slightly longer period on the E and F, until the truck crisis was resolved and the R10s were once again, for the most part back, on the CC and GG with only occasional usage on the A until April 1983.

In 1975, car 3192 had a new R42 type front installed; it was a prototype car for a complete rebuilding of the fleet, which would add modern interiors and air-conditioning. The unit was scrapped in 1980 inside Coney Island Yard and the rebuilding program never took place with the other cars because of the higher cost of rebuilding the cars as opposed to purchasing new cars.

The R10s were rebuilt beginning in early 1985 under the General Overhaul (GOH) program as a result of deferred maintenance in the transit system during the 1970s and 1980s. 110 cars, which were Westinghouse powered, were rebuilt in-house at the 207th Street Overhaul Shop in Inwood, Manhattan; the car bodies were painted in a dark green color with black trim around the end signs and silver roofs, although fox red was initially proposed for the bodies instead of dark green. The first overhauled train entered service in February 1985 and was assigned to the CC line. By August 1986, all overhauled cars were in service.

=== Retirement ===
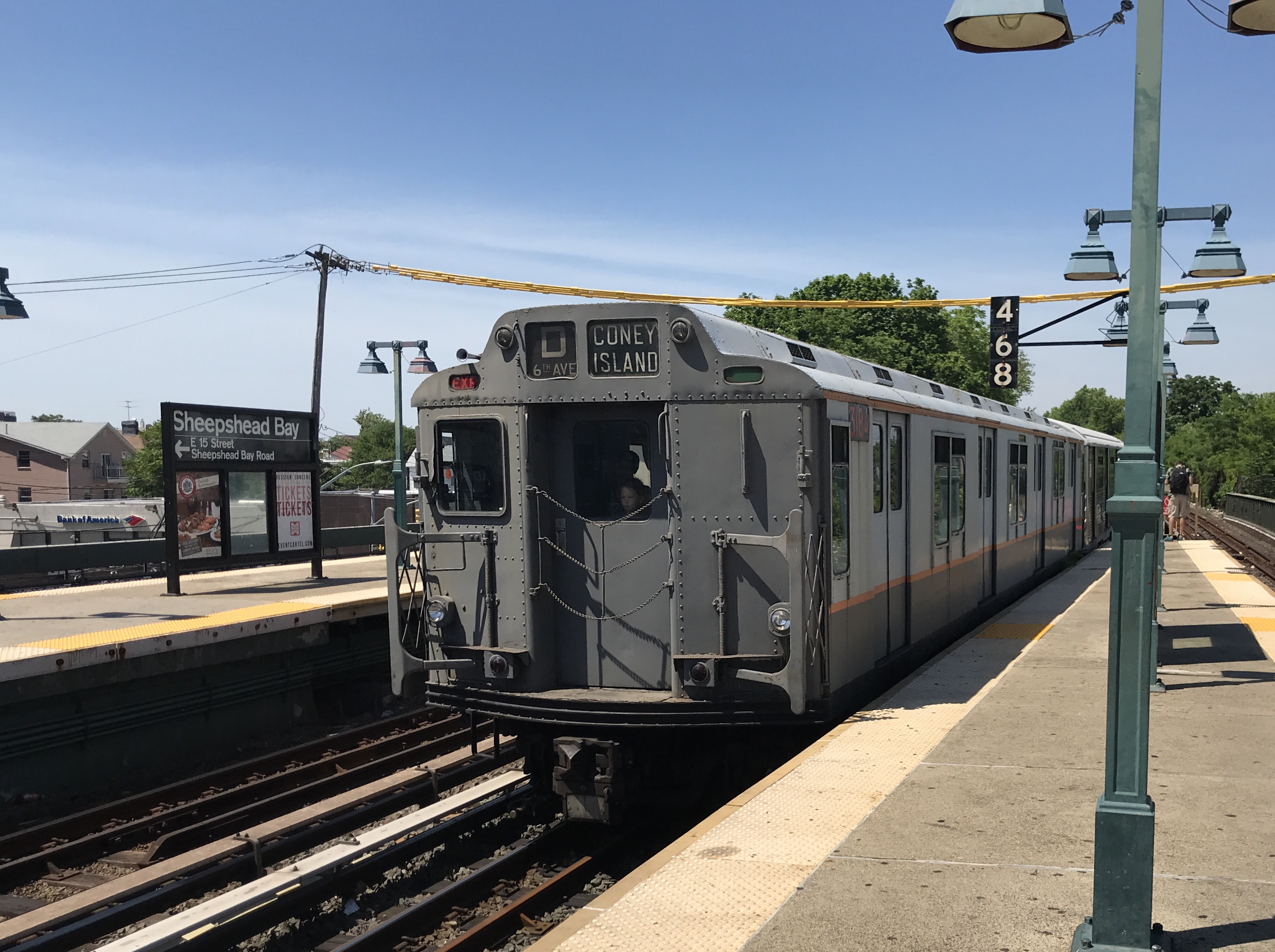
R10 car 3184 at Sheepshead Bay on the Train of Many Metals in 2018

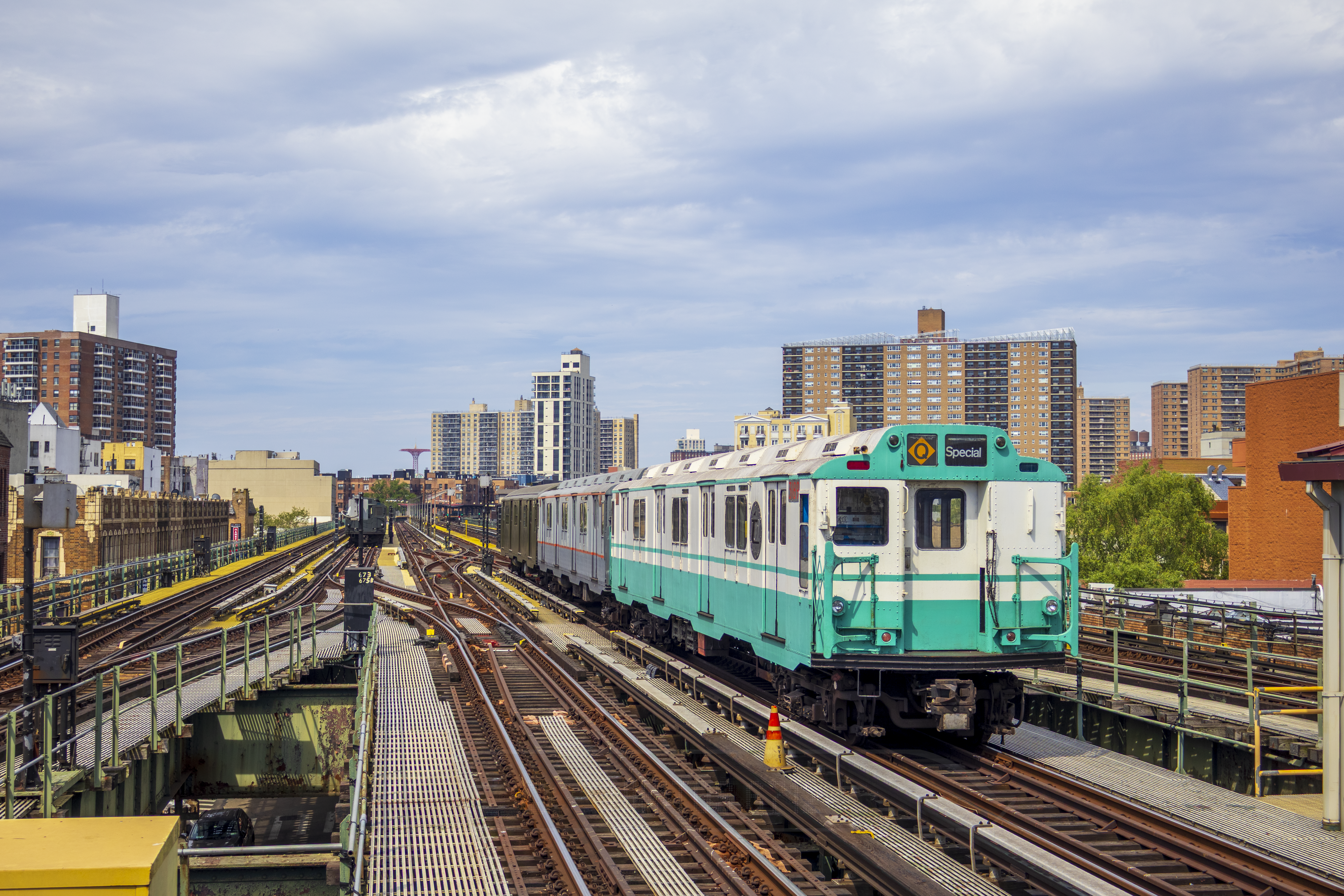
R10 car 3189 at the Brighton Beach Layup tracks on the Train of Many Metals in June 2026

Approximately 53 R10s were replaced by the R46s between 1977 and 1978. While the remaining cars may have been considered the second worst operating revenue service car during the 1980s based on MDBF (Mean Distance Between Failures), doing better than only the R46s, many R10s outlasted the newer R11s and R16s.

The remaining R10s were replaced by the R68 and R68As. The last train of General Electric-powered R10s and non-overhauled Westinghouse-powered R10s ran on November 10, 1988, ten days short of the 40th anniversary of their debut. The rebuilt Westinghouse-powered R10s were withdrawn from March 1989 to September 8, 1989, when the last revenue service train ran on the C line. On October 29, 1989, the Electric Railroaders' Association sponsored a fan trip dedicated to the R10 fleet; the fan trip coincided with the opening of the 63rd Street Lines.

After retirement, most cars were sent to what is now Sims Metal Management's Newark facility to be scrapped and processed. Most R10s were scrapped by June 1990; the last R10 to be taken off property was 3081, the last GE-powered car in existence. It was scrapped sometime in 1993.

Two cars have been preserved, cars 3184 and 3189:

3184 has been preserved by the Railway Preservation Corp. and was previously displayed at the New York Transit Museum. It was repainted into its original two-tone gray and orange striped paint scheme, similar to R7A 1575. The car was restored to operating status in 2017 and has been operating on New York City Transit Museum-sponsored excursions since July 2017, specifically on the Train of Many Metals (TOMM).

3189 has been preserved by the New York Transit Museum. The car had an experimental 3-passenger transverse fiberglass interior seating installed in 1969, which has since been removed. It was retired from revenue service in 1984, but was later repainted solid blue and used as a training car for road car inspectors at the TA's Pitkin Yard in Brooklyn. The car was restored to operating status in 2022 – during which the car was repainted into the aqua blue/white scheme – and has been operating on New York Transit Museum-sponsored excursions since September 2022.
