= R46 (New York City Subway car) =

Class of New York City Subway car

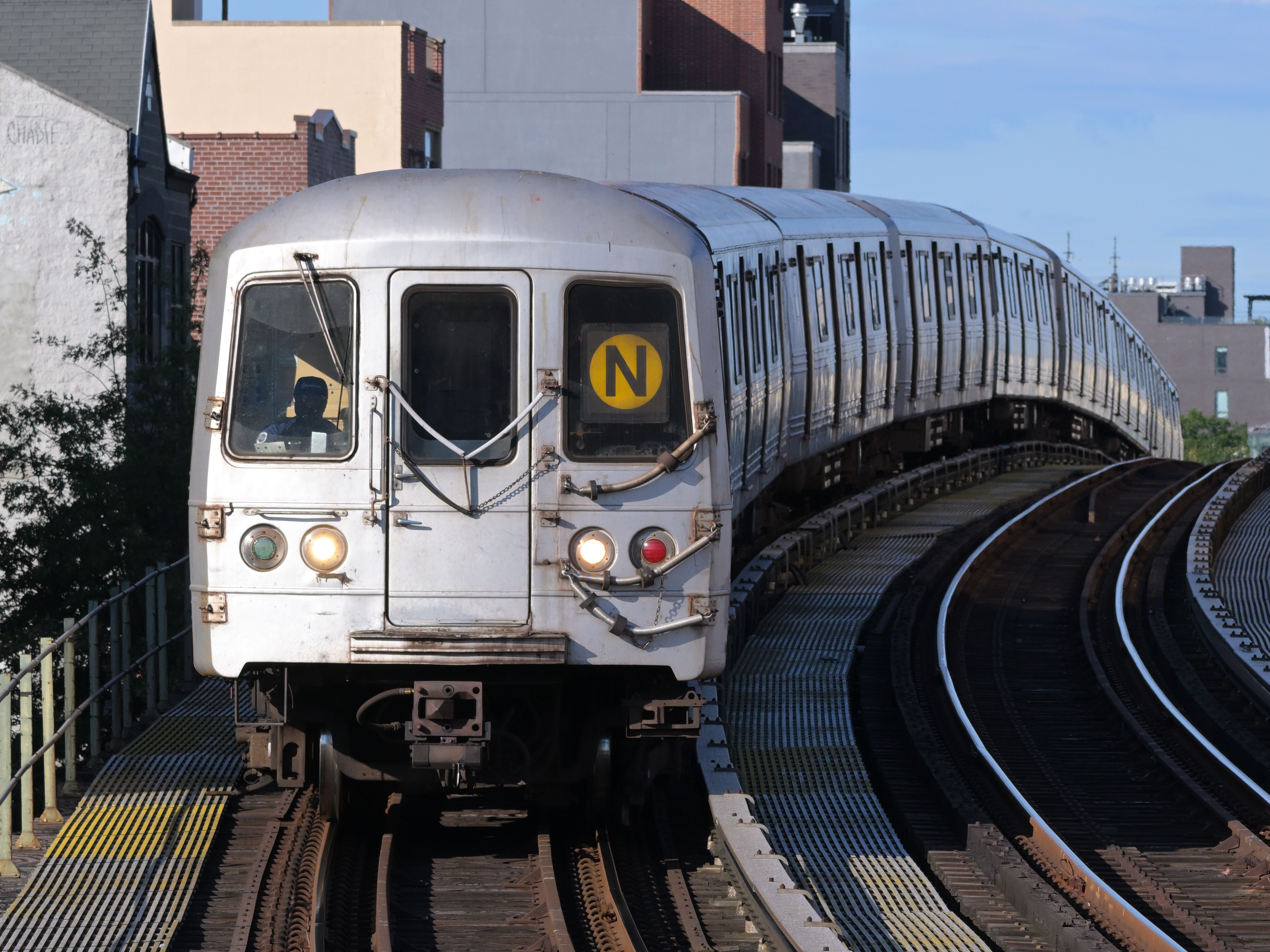
- An R46 train on the N near 30th Avenue

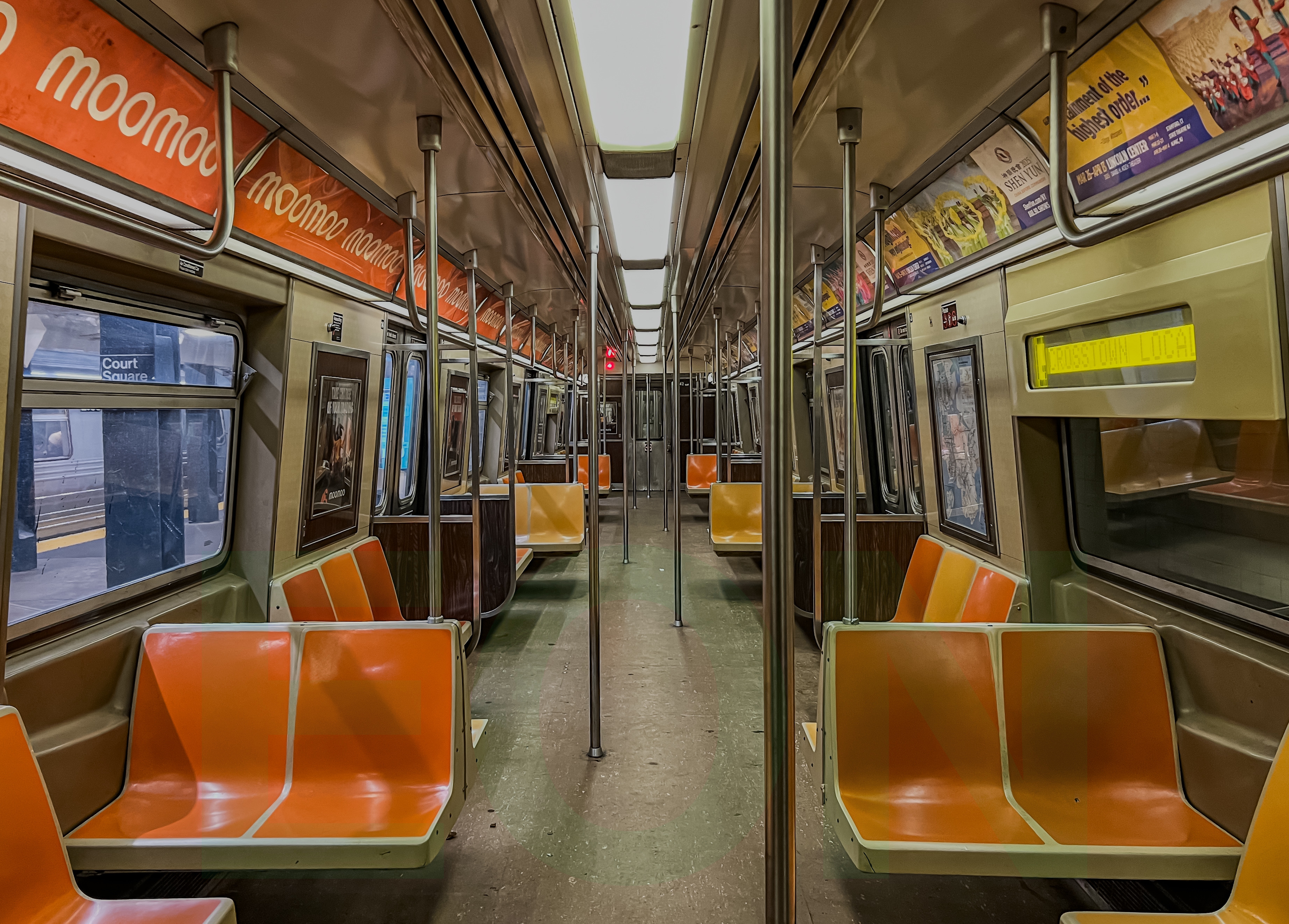
- Interior of an R46 car
- In service: July 14, 1975 – present (51 years)
- Manufacturer: Pullman Standard Rail Company
- Built at: Chicago, Illinois
- Replaced: All remaining R1–9s; Some R10s; All GE-powered R16s
- Constructed: 1975–1978
- Entered service: July 14, 1975
- Refurbished: 1990–1992
- Scrapped: 2025–present
- Number built: 754
- Number in service: 96
- Number preserved: 1
- Successor: R211
- Formation: 4 car sets (5482–6207); Married Pairs (6208–6258) (even)
- Fleet numbers: 5482–6207, 6208–6258 (even) (originally 500–1227, 1228–1278 (even))
- Capacity: 70 (seated-A car); 76 (seated-B car)
- Operator: New York City Subway
- Depot: Coney Island Yard
- Services assigned: (Updated June 30, 2024)

Specifications
- Car body construction: Stainless steel with fiberglass end bonnets
- Train length: 4 car train: 300 feet (91.4 m); 8 car train: 600 feet (183 m)
- Car length: 74 ft 8.5 in (22.77 m) (over anticlimbers)
- Width: 10 ft (3,048 mm) (over threshold)
- Height: 12.08 ft (3,682 mm)
- Platform height: 3.76 ft (1.15 m)
- Doors: 8 sets of 50-inch (1,270 mm) wide side doors per car
- Maximum speed: 55 mph (89 km/h)
- Weight: 91,000 lb (41,277 kg) (A car); 86,670 lb (39,313 kg) (B car)
- Traction system: General Electric SCM 17KG192AH1
- Traction motors: GE 1257E1
- Power output: 115 hp (85.8 kW) per axle
- Acceleration: 2.5 mph/s (4.0 km/(h⋅s))
- Deceleration: 3.0 mph/s (4.8 km/(h⋅s)) (Full Service); 3.2 mph/s (5.1 km/(h⋅s)) (Emergency)
- Electric systems: Third rail, 625 V DC
- Current collection: Contact shoe
- Braking systems: New York Air Brake "SMEE" Braking System, Tread Brake unit model D7587719
- Safety systems: Dead man's switch, tripcock
- Headlight type: Halogen light bulb
- Track gauge: 4 ft 8 1/2 in (1,435 mm) standard gauge

The R46 is a New York City Subway car model that was built by the Pullman Standard Company from 1975 to 1978 for the IND/BMT B Division. They replaced all remaining R1–9 fleet cars and General Electric-powered R16s, and some R10s. The R46 order initially consisted of 754 single cars, each 75 feet (23 m) long, and was the largest single order of passenger cars in United States railroad history at the point of the fleet's completion. The R46 was the second order of 75-foot cars to be ordered for the New York City Subway, after the R44s.

The first R46s ran in passenger service on July 14, 1975. The fleet was initially slated to be delivered between 1973 and 1975, but a strike at Pullman's factory delayed final deliveries until 1978. Several hundred cracks were found in the R46 trucks during their first few years of service, leading them to be referred to as "the most troubled cars ever purchased". Morrison–Knudsen rebuilt the R46s in 1990–1992. The R46 fleet is currently being phased out in favor of the R211, and is therefore expected to remain in service until the late 2020s.

== Description ==
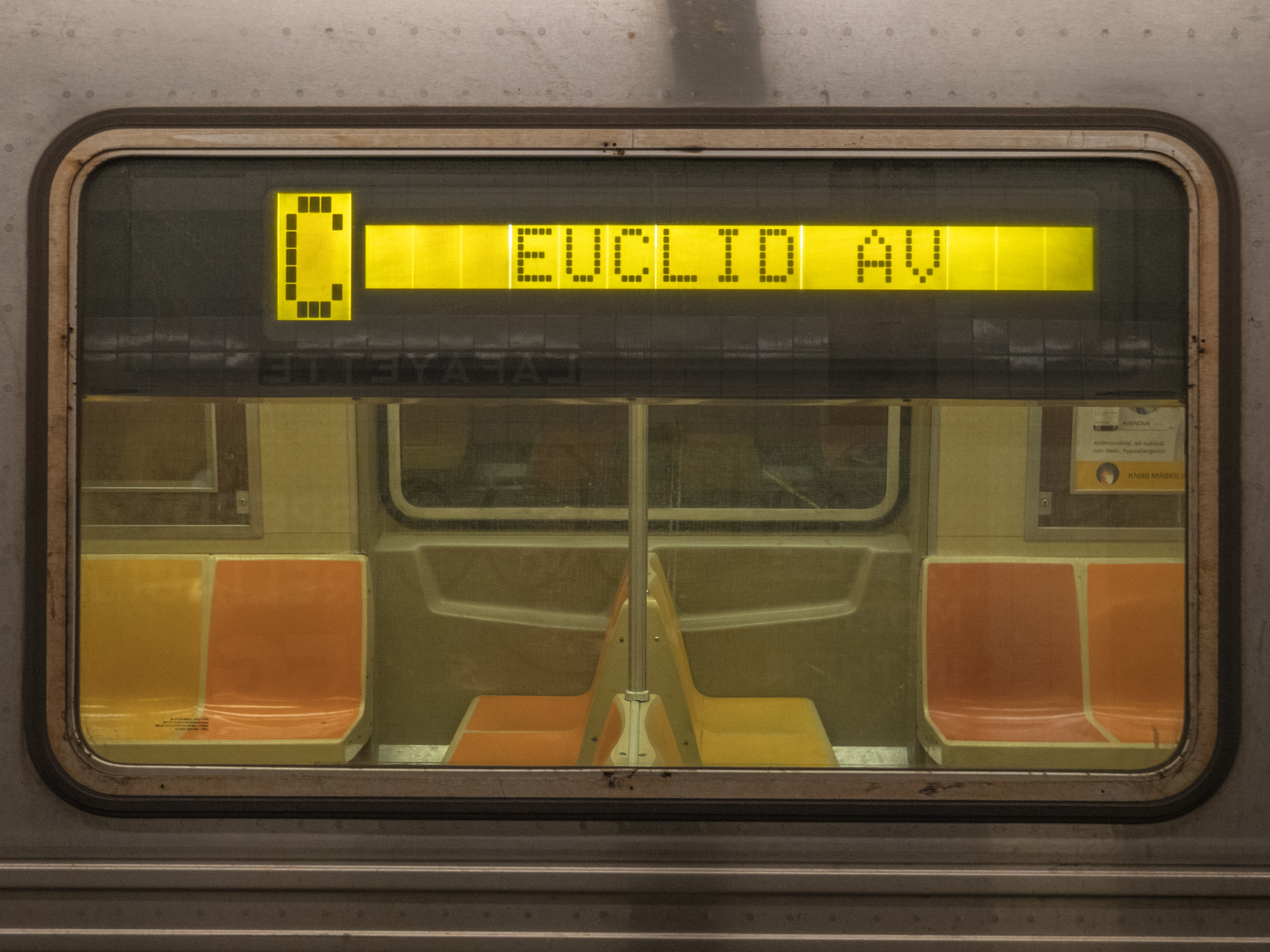
The current LCD side destination sign. This replaces the original rollsign-based side destination signs on the cars prior to the cars' overhauls

The R46s are numbered 5482–6207 and 6208–6258 (even numbers only). 5482–6207 were originally numbered 500–1227 (except numbers 941 & 1054, as those two cars were scrapped prior to overhaul), and 6208–6258 were originally numbered 1228–1278 (even numbers only). The R46 order consisted of 754 single cars, originally planned to be 745, that were numbered from 500 to 1278. Even cars with cabs are A cars; odd cars without cabs are B cars. The cars cost about $285,000 each. Like the previous R44s, the R46s are 75 feet (22.86 m) long and cannot safely run on particular segments of the BMT Eastern Division (the J/Z, L, and M).

The R46s were constructed with sheet rubber floors, plastic seats, fluorescent lighting, spaces for ceiling advertisements, and the use of air springs instead of heavy metal springs. The design of the cars was similar to the previous R44s, with orange and yellow transverse bucket seats, wood panelling, and beige wallpaper. The change in springs reduced noisy and bumpy rides. The cars were not equipped with straphangers like previous models. Instead, horizontal bars that passengers could hold on to were installed. The cars were built with air-conditioning.

As of June 2026, the cars run on the N, Q, and W.

== History ==
=== Delivery ===
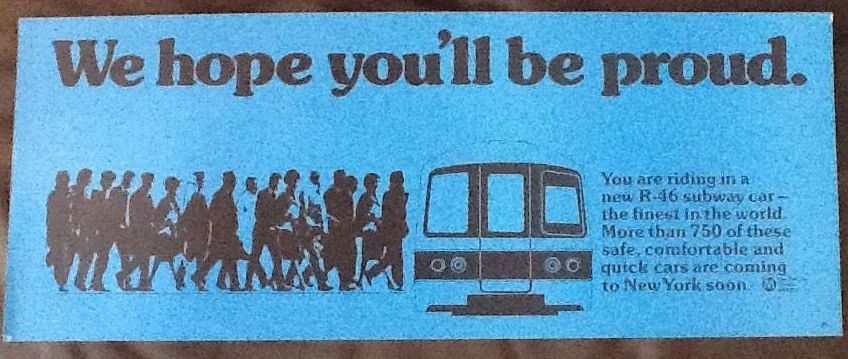
Poster celebrating the new R46 cars

On April 7, 1972, Pullman Standard bid on the contract for 900 subway cars, and it was the highest bidder. It put in a bid of $273,000 per car, or $246 million for the entire contract. Other bidders included General Electric, Rohr Industries, and Westinghouse Electric Corporation. The cars were to be constructed almost identically to the R44s. Once the order was awarded to Pullman Standard, the cars were constructed at the company's shops on the South Side of Chicago. The subway car order was the largest single order of passenger cars in United States railroad history at the point of the fleet's completion.

Once the order was reduced to 754 cars, the entire cost of the order was reduced to $210.5 million. The first cars were expected to be tested in the NYC Subway by October 1973, and all of the cars were expected to be delivered by October 15, 1975. However, the first cars were not delivered until March 1975, and the first train was not placed in service until July 14, 1975, with a brief ceremony at 34th Street–Herald Square, attended by Mayor Abraham Beame and MTA Chairman David Yunich; the train afterward entered service on the F.

On June 26, 1976, cars 680 and 681 were delivered in a commemorative livery and temporarily numbered "1776" and "1976," respectively, to celebrate the United States Bicentennial. They were also placed on display to mark the grand opening of the New York Transit Museum during the bicentennial. Notably, car 680 was also the 200th R46 delivered; it was delivered with window signage that read "The 200th R46, For America's 200th Birthday."

In 1976, Pullman-Standard shipped car 816 (later renumbered 5866) from its Chicago, IL plant to Caracas, Venezuela as a brief exhibit for the planned Caracas Metro. The car was used as a sample of rolling stock for the system, which was under construction at the time; it was later delivered to NYCTA property in 1977.

Due to a strike at the Pullman Company on October 1, 1977, along with other problems, the final R46s entered service in December 1978, three years behind schedule.

==== Manufacturing problems and incidents ====
In March 1977, there was a crack found in the frame of one of the lightweight trucks built by Rockwell International, which resulted in a motor breaking loose from the truck's transom arms, striking an axle. By 1978, cracks were found in 264 R46 trucks. Because of these problems, all R46s had to be checked three times per week for truck cracks. In February 1978, 889 cracks were found in 547 of the trucks. The cracking was such a bad problem that on June 14, 1979, New York City Mayor Koch ordered R46s with trucks that had two or more cracks out of service. Then, more than 1,200 cracks had been found by that day, and they were classified into seven types. There was an account that called the R46s "the most troubled cars ever purchased". By this time, the number of cracks had almost doubled, from 889 cracks found in February 1979 to 1,700 in March 1980. In order to keep track of the R46s' structural issues, they were inspected several times a week. In September 1980, two types of cracks that were not seen before were found on the trucks. As a result of the R46 fleet's mechanical issues, the NYCTA sought to minimize their usage – limiting them to rush-hour service – until their defective parts could be replaced.

In July 1979, Pullman Standard informed the MTA that the hand brake assemblies for the R46 were problematic. In late July 1979, inspections revealed that the steel where the car body was joined to the truck was wearing away, a severe safety issue. At the end of 1979, many other flaws were discovered in the R46 fleet, and the Transit Authority filed another US$80 million charge against Pullman Standard and a number of other subcontractors. These lawsuits invalidated an agreement made with Pullman by executive director John G. DeRoos for US$1.5 million in spare parts to remedy the defects.

In 1983, organizations for the blind stated that the gaps in between R44 and R46 cars were dangerous, since blind passengers could not discern the space between subway cars and open car doors. "Baloney" coil spring-type intercar safety barriers were installed on all cars of both fleets by the end of 1984.

On April 26, 1986, cars 1054 and 941 were heavily damaged when an E train hit the tunnel wall near Jamaica–179th Street. The accident occurred because the 54-year-old motorman, Alick Williams of Saint Albans, had a heart attack; he died at the scene. The two damaged cars were scrapped on June 4, 1987.

=== General Overhaul Program ===
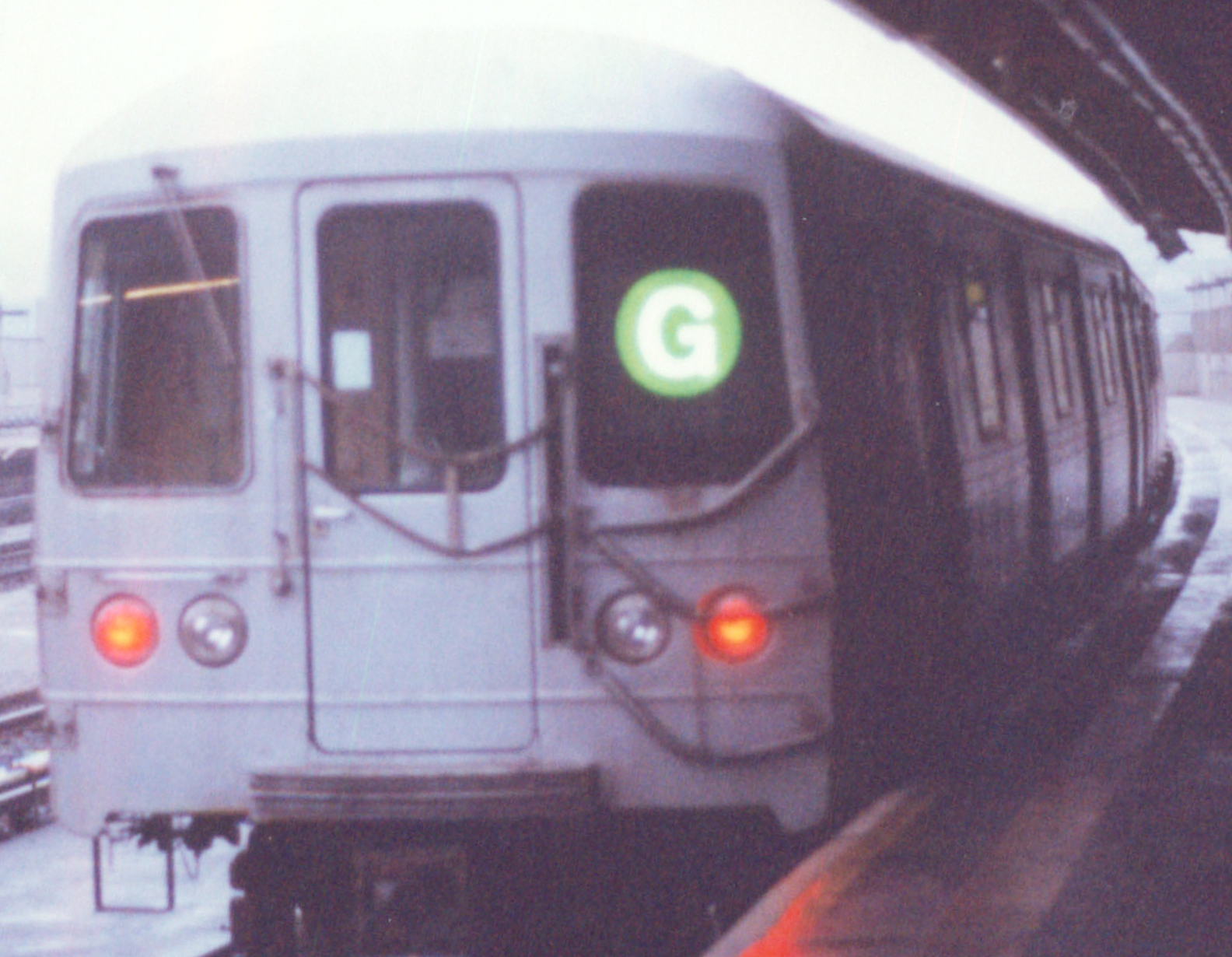
An R46 in service on the G just after overhaul in the early 1990s

From 1990 to 1992, Morrison–Knudsen of Hornell, New York, rebuilt the remaining 752 R46s through the NYCTA's General Overhaul Program (GOH). During the GOH, the fleet received the same LCD destination signs as the R44s, replacing the older rollsigns. The blue stripes on the side of the cars were removed, resulting in the appearance of an entirely unpainted car body (the fiberglass ends remain painted silver to match the stainless sides). Other improvements included the rebuilding of all mechanical systems and making the R46 more compatible with other car types. Also, their trouble-prone WABCO RT-5 or P-Wire braking system was removed and replaced with a more reliable NYAB Newtran SMEE braking/control system.

After their overhaul, the R46s were renumbered 5482–6258 in the mid-1990s. Cars 5482–6205 were linked in sets of four, cars 6208–6258 (even only) were linked up as A-A pairs, and cars 6206–6207 were configured as one A-B married pair. Due to the overhaul, the fleet's reliability has vastly improved, and the R46 is no longer considered to be the lemon that it once was.

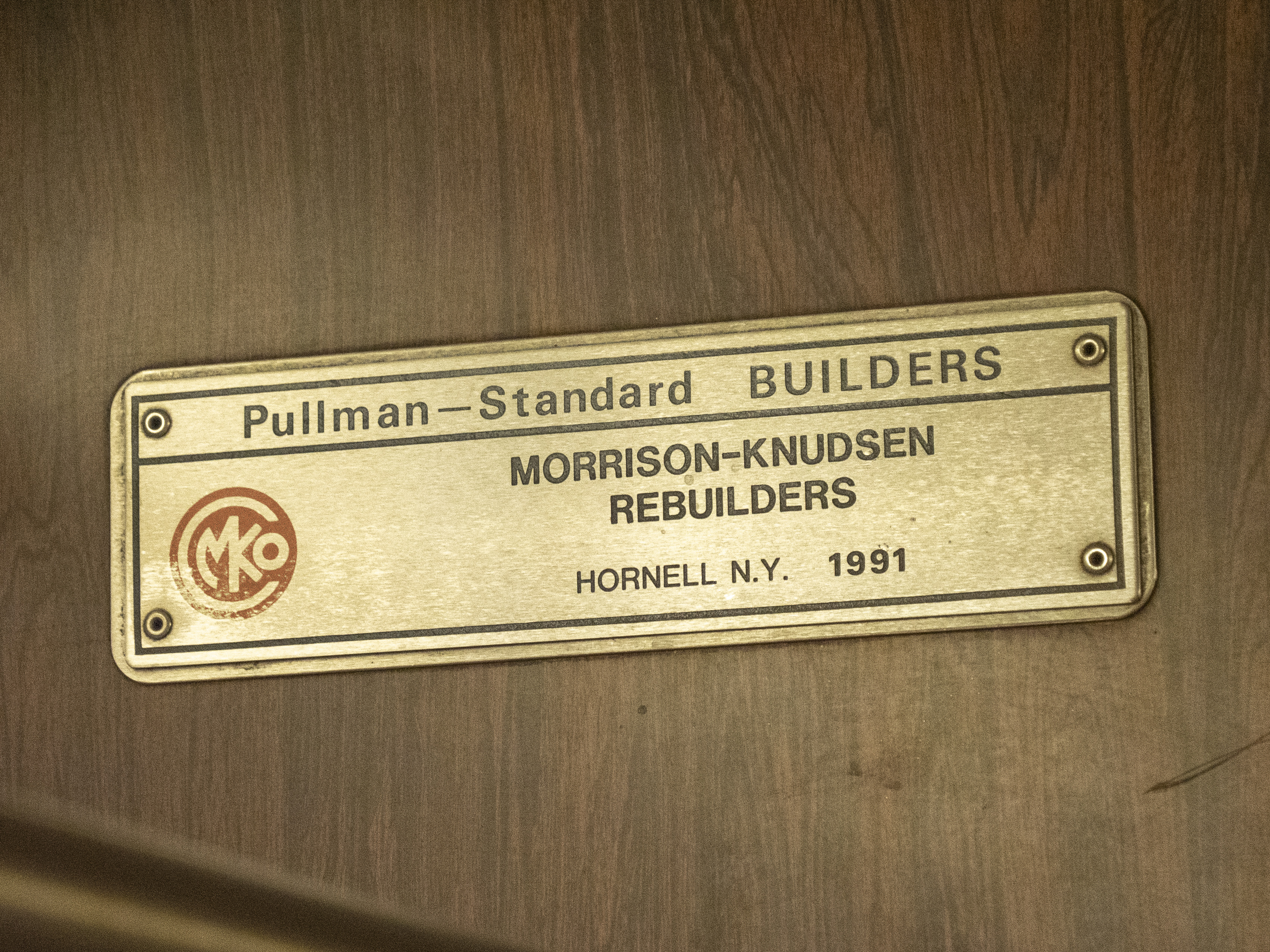
Overhaul plate of the R46

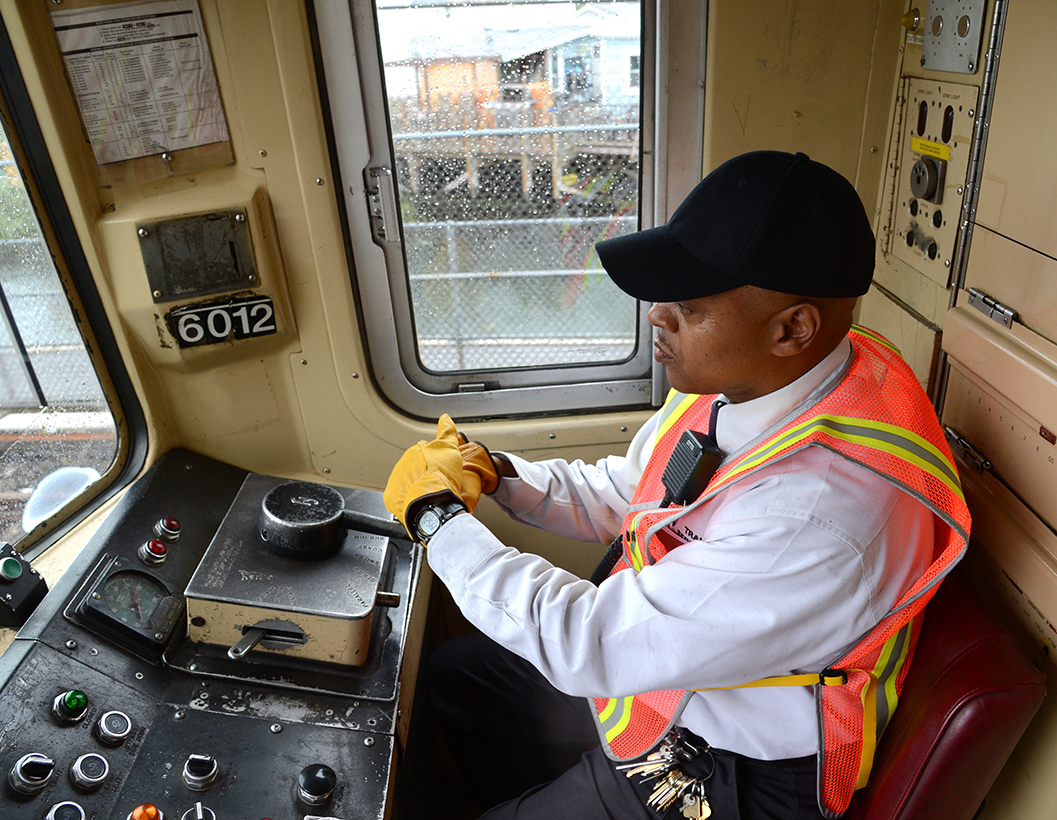
The operator's cab of R46 car 6012

=== Post-overhaul and mishaps ===
Since the late 2000s, the R46s have undergone intermittent rounds of scheduled maintenance as their parts age over time to extend their usefulness until their retirement. Since January 2022, the R46s have been the oldest active subway cars at 51 years old. They are also the second oldest active rolling stock within the NYCT system, behind the R44s still in reserve service on the Staten Island Railway.

On May 2, 2014, set 5742–5745 was involved in a derailment due to track defects while running on the F. The whole set was pulled from service, but was repaired and returned to service in February 2016.

On June 27, 2017, set 6150–6153 was involved in a derailment north of 125th Street while running on the A. The whole set was pulled from service. Cars 6150–6151 suffered body damage as they collided with tunnel columns and were retired. Car 6151 was briefly retained and fitted with strip maps, colored wraps, and had some seats removed to serve as a non-operational mockup for future retrofits, all as a part of the 2017 action plan. Meanwhile, cars 6152–6153 were linked with cars 6206–6207 to create a new four-car set and re-entered service.

On September 20, 2020, set 6062–6065 was involved in a derailment at 14th Street while running on the A when a man placed track tie plates onto the main rails, causing the train to derail. The whole set was pulled from service. Car 6062 suffered body damage as it collided with track-side columns and was retired. Meanwhile, cars 6063–6065 were linked with car 6212 to create a new four-car set and re-entered service. Car 6214, no longer paired with a mate, was subsequently taken out of service.

Set 5550–5553 was involved in a shooting in April 2022 while running on the N and has been out of service ever since the incident.

On August 18, 2025, a battery box fire occurred in car 5686 at 36th Street while running on the N. Although only the lead car sustained damage, the entire 4-car set was permanently retired instead of being repaired, as the R46 fleet is currently being retired at the time.

=== Retirement ===
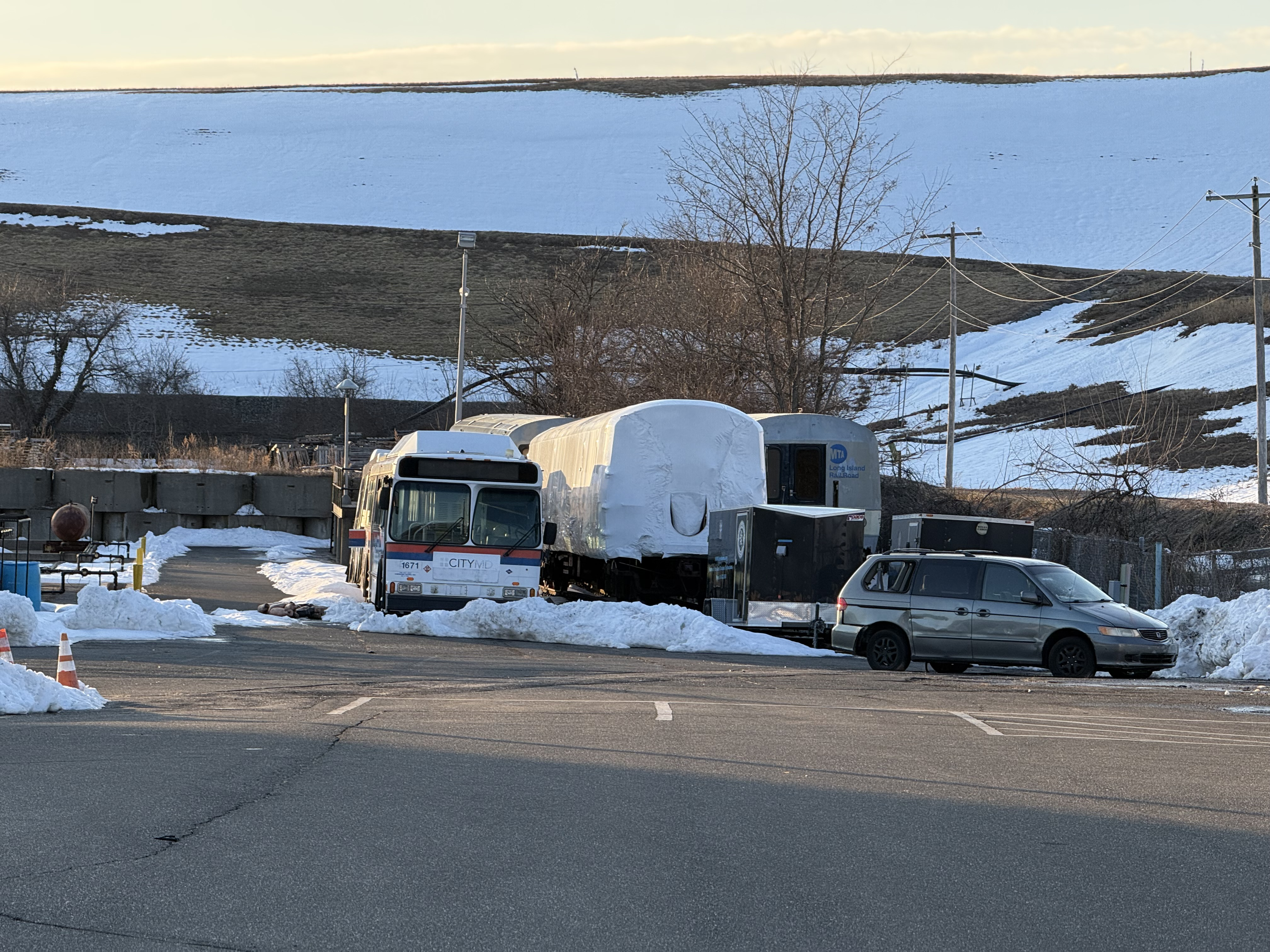
R46 car 5551 (car in the middle) at the Nassau Fire Service Academy

In 1981, the New York Transit Authority's car replacement program estimated that the R46s would be replaced in 2011.

In January 2018, the MTA awarded a contract to Kawasaki Railcar Manufacturing for the delivery and purchase of new subway cars (the R211) in order to retire the R46s, as well as the Staten Island Railway R44s. Since spring 2024, the R46 fleet has been gradually phased out. Since April 2025, retired cars are being towed through the South Brooklyn Railway, New York New Jersey Rail, and the Brooklyn Army Terminal before being further towed to Sims Metal Management's Jersey City facility to be scrapped.

As of March 2026, one R46 subway car has been preserved:

- Car 5551, the car in which the April 2022 shooting occurred in. This car was separated from the rest of the set and tarped up. It was eventually sent to the Nassau Fire Service Academy in Old Bethpage, New York for use as a training car.
