= D-type Triplex (New York City Subway car) =

Retired class of New York City Subway car

D-type "Triplex"
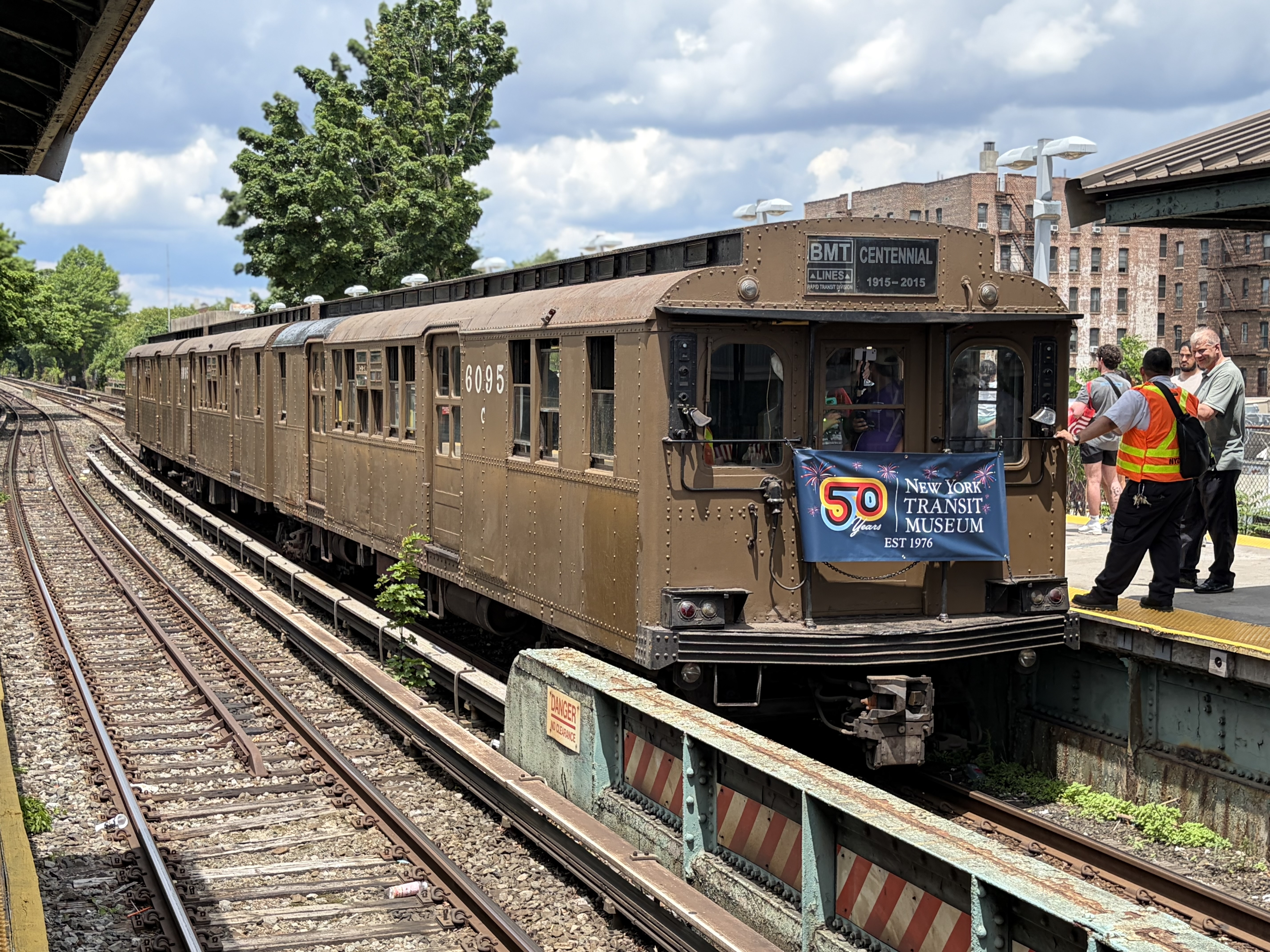
- D-type set 6095 on the BMT Brighton Line in June 2026

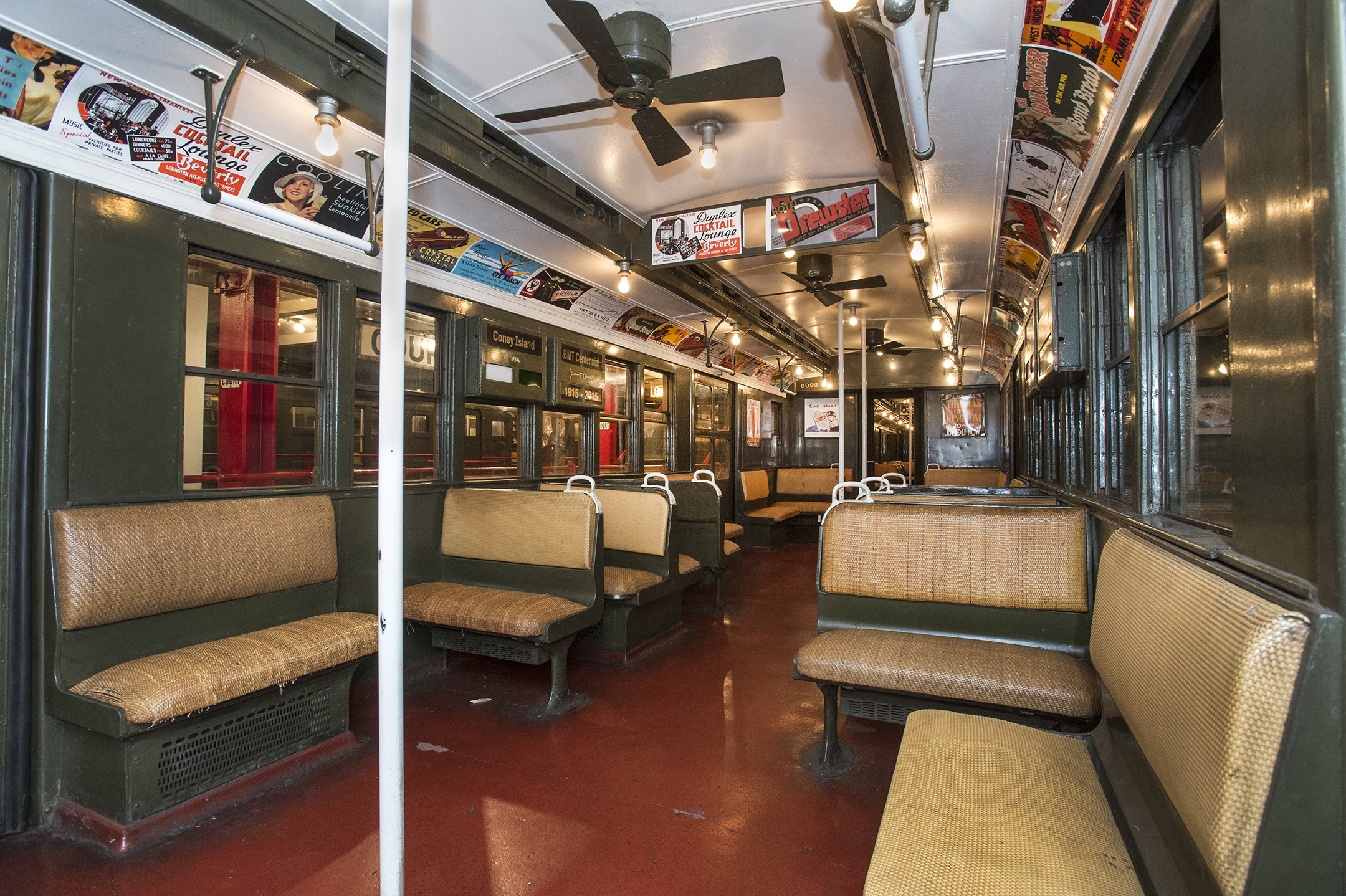
- Interior of D-Type unit 6095
- In service: 1925–1965
- Manufacturer: Pressed Steel Car Company
- Constructed: 1925, 1927–1928
- Number built: 121
- Number preserved: 3^{1}/_{3}
- Number scrapped: 117^{2}/_{3}
- Successor: R27; R30; R32
- Formation: Three-section articulated units
- Fleet numbers: 6000–6120 A-B-C
- Capacity: 555: 160 (seated), 395 (standing)
- Operators: Brooklyn–Manhattan Transit Corporation; NYC Board of Transportation; New York City Transit Authority

Specifications
- Car body construction: Steel
- Car length: A and C units: 45 ft 4 1/2 in (13.83 m); B units: 38 ft 11 3/4 in (11.88 m); Total: 137 ft 3 in (41.83 m)
- Width: 9 ft 10 15/16 in (3,021 mm)
- Height: 12 ft 1 3/4 in (3,702 mm)
- Floor height: 3 ft 1 1/8 in (0.94 m)
- Doors: 12
- Articulated sections: 3
- Maximum speed: 45 mi (72 km) per hour
- Weight: 207,600–213,600 lb (94,166–96,887 kg)
- Traction system: Westinghouse 143 or GE PC-15 propulsion system, using GE 282D motors or Westinghouse 584 motors (200hp each). 4 motors per car (1 per truck).
- Power output: 200 hp (149 kW) per traction motor
- Electric systems: 600 V DC third rail
- Current collection: Top running contact shoe
- UIC classification: Bo’Bo’+Bo’Bo’+Bo’Bo’
- AAR wheel arrangement: B-B+B-B+B-B
- Coupling system: WABCO H2A
- Track gauge: 4 ft 8 1/2 in (1,435 mm)

The D-Type, commonly known as the Triplex, was a New York City Subway car class built by Pressed Steel Car Company. They were operated by the Brooklyn–Manhattan Transit Corporation (BMT) and its successors, which included the New York City Board of Transportation and the New York City Transit Authority (NYCTA). The fleet consisted of 121 cars, each arranged as three-section articulated units. Four units were built as a prototype in 1925, and the production units were built during 1927 and 1928.

The D-types were the first articulated rapid transit rolling stock used in the United States, and were followed by several more articulated trains until the BMT sold all of its transit operations to the City on June 1, 1940. First placed into service in 1925, they operated primarily on the BMT's Southern Division, although they would also appear on many other parts of the subway system. The R27s, R30s, and R32s slowly replaced the triplex cars, which last ran on July 23, 1965. Three sets and a section were preserved, and the rest were scrapped.

== History ==
The D Triplexes were purchased by the Brooklyn–Manhattan Transit Corporation specifically to augment the service provided by the BMT/BRT A/B Standards. They were used over the years in Southern Division lines based at Coney Island. This permitted several of the A/B units used in these services to be transferred to East New York, and in turn, permitted the removal of the last BU wooden el cars from service in the BMT Centre Street Line in 1927. Other service improvements included the extension of various lines — the BMT Fourth Avenue Line one station from 86th Street to Bay Ridge–95th Street and the BMT 14th St.–Canarsie Line from Montrose Avenue to a connection at East New York with the other lines operating out of that point. In addition, most stations along the Southern Division lines were being extended to permit operation of maximum length trains – 8 car "A/B"s or 4 unit "D"s.

They were originally placed in service on the Fourth Avenue Local running from 95th Street to Queensboro Plaza, with some additional units used on the Brighton Local. This was undoubtedly done to provide maximum exposure for these cars; however, in September 1928, before the entire fleet of 121 units had been delivered, the units serving in Fourth Avenue Local service were transferred to the Sea Beach Express, where, as heavyweight cars with a slow acceleration but very fast overall speed, it was felt that they could provide better service. In 1932, full length trains of these units began operating with only one conductor aside from the motorman.

The next major change of assignment for these cars came on April 27, 1950, when the units on the Brighton Local were transferred to Brighton Express service. The BMT Astoria Line's platforms were still under construction, and parts of the platforms were still closed to passengers, requiring trains to use two conductors when traveling on that line. As the A/B Standards trains still used two conductors until September 1958, this move served to save on crews, although D Triplexes continued to be used on certain fixed intervals on the Brighton Local until December 1, 1955, and sporadically after that date.

On May 27–28, 1959, the Brighton Express now became virtually all D Triplexes (except once again for certain fixed intervals which used A/B Standards), with the Sea Beach Express for the first time in nearly 31 years seeing the usage of A/B-Standards along with the D Triplexes that were still used. With the drastic reduction in West End service that took place at this time, it was decided to run all Sea Beach trains at maximum length 8 cars. The Brighton Express, in the meantime, continued to run a fluctuating 6 or 8 car service during the course of the day, which required much coupling and cutting of trains. As the D Triplexes were better suited for this purpose, having a much more advanced type of coupler, it was decided to keep these cars for that purpose on the Brighton Express, where they served virtually until the end of their lives.

A further change came over the days April 13–15, 1963, when the units used on the Sea Beach Express were transferred to the West End Express as well as the various Nassau Street services as needed. As these cars were approaching their last days and were now seen as oddball types, it was decided to cut their mileage as much as possible to simplify maintenance procedures; moreover, by June of that year, they began to reappear on the Sea Beach Express once again along with the above. This was undoubtedly to dissipate the mileage on them even further. The oft-stated concern of their weight being too heavy for the Manhattan Bridge was apparently not a factor, as they could be seen in service on the Bridge to the very end of their lives.

Over their entire lifetime, they had appeared on all four routes serving Coney Island by the Brighton, West End, Sea Beach, and Culver Lines, as well as the 4th Ave. Line to Bay Ridge–95th St. at one time or other, as well as all Nassau Street services, weekend Franklin Avenue Local service to Brighton Beach, Culver Shuttle, and also to Astoria and via the 60th Street Tunnel Connection and over the IND Queens Boulevard Line to Forest Hills (during the 1957 motormen's strike, some units ran over this line to 179th Street).

The units had a reputation with the BMT and subsequent operating agencies for being especially reliable, requiring minimal maintaining and experiencing fewer breakdowns than other New York subway equipment.

=== Retirement ===
These cars were replaced by the R27s, R30s, and R32s. The last units were retired from service on July 23, 1965, with the last train in service having operated as a West End Local in the A.M. rush on that date.

D-type sets 6019, 6095, and 6112 are preserved by the New York Transit Museum. These cars operated on various fan trips until 2004, when, in the 2004 "Parade of Trains", wheelslip heavily damaged the motors of one set. Unable to operate on its own power, the train was towed to Coney Island Yard. Set 6095 resided in the New York Transit Museum, while sets 6019 and 6112 were stored at Coney Island Yard. These sets were transferred to Pitkin Yard when it was discovered that the cars had severe corrosion damage. In 2015, sets 6095 and 6112 received mechanical and cosmetic work at the 207th Street Yard and have been operational on fan trips since late June 2015. Set 6019 remains out of service and is currently stored at Pitkin Yard.

The "B" section of a Triplex unit survives on a farm in Catskill, New York. It was repainted into a red scheme, was modified for storage, and is truckless.

== Technical notes ==
The D Triplexes were the first New York rolling stock to include front destination signs with a route designation. These signs introduced the route numbering to the BMT system. The numbers started to be replaced in 1960 with the current letters on all subsequent equipment to be delivered. They also featured inside the cars a sign box, which included large dual destination signs that could be keyed by the train operator to light up in the direction the train was traveling. There were also lighted signs to indicate whether a train was traveling via the Montague Street Tunnel or the Manhattan Bridge in white or green, respectively.

The D Triplex is articulated, consisting of three car body sections, sequentially labeled A, B, and C carried on four trucks. All four trucks are powered by one 200 horsepower (150 kW) motor each. Two trucks are placed on kingpins near the ends of the A and C sections and don't have contact shoes. The other two trucks are placed beneath each of the articulation drums that attach the center B section to the A and C sections. These trucks have contact shoes. The wheel diameter varies with the type of axle: those with contact shoes have axle wheels that are 34 inches (860 mm) in diameter, while those without contact shoes have axle wheels that are just 31 inches (790 mm) in diameter. All are equipped with motors, however.

The D-type Triplexes were the first articulated rapid transit rolling stock used in the United States, with all subsequent rapid transit equipment ordered by the BMT - both production and experimental - being articulated units. All BMT articulated equipment deployed open gangways. After the City of New York acquired the BMT in June 1940, no more cars with open gangways were purchased for the New York City Subway until the R211 order in 2018, which includes 20 open gangway prototype cars designated as R211T. Unlike BMT rapid transit equipment, the R211T cars are not true articulated railcars as cars do not share trucks with each other.

The 121 units built were delivered under three separate orders: the 4 pilot units, 6000–6003, in 1925. The regular units followed afterward with 67 units, 6004–6070, in 1927, and the remaining 50 units, 6071–6120, in 1928.

The original pilot units, 6000–6003, were delivered with roller bearing trucks and were intended to run in a separate consist. The last of the regular units, 6120, was similarly equipped to serve as a spare unit. However, at a later date, 6003 was modified to run with the regular D Triplex units. After May 1959, all units were freely mixed together in consists. It appears that, from photograph evidence, the pilot units as delivered lacked the MUDC feature, which was added after delivery. All units of the regular fleet came equipped with MUDC as delivered.

After 1945, the train with roller bearing trucks (6000, 6001, 6002, 6120) was restricted to Sea Beach Express service due to noise complaints from residents along the Brighton Line; however, concurrent with the service changes and equipment shifts in May 1959, the train was transferred to Brighton Express service. Shortly afterward, the train was broken up, and the units henceforth ran in consists mixed with regular D Triplex units.

General operating features were a considerable improvement over those of the A/B Standards. The D Triplex units, being much heavier, had a much slower acceleration rate but was capable of considerably higher speeds. They used a pneumatic controller similar to that in the IRT Flivvers and the last series of Standard Low-Vs from 1925.

Braking was a lot smoother and more positive in effect than on the A/B Standards. A variable load valve used on these cars, not contingent on the electric brake plug being engaged but completely automatic in operation, was another improvement.

The door operation, which once again required a conductor to operate outside between the cars, was also far more reliable, with a handle system that worked far better than the buttons on the center control board that the A/B Standards had. This new system was also used on all the BMT's el cars that were converted to MUDC operation; the C-types of 1923–1925 and the Q-types of 1938–1939. As with the A/B Standards, it required the insertion of a key to activate the system. A conductor's indication light was located directly above the door operating device. Additionally, there was a double interlock system, by which a train standing with its doors open could not take power. Conversely, on a train running at a speed 4 mph or faster, the doors could not be opened, provided that the train was taking power at the time.

=== Individual car notes ===
Brass window sashes were used on all units except for 6002 and 6003, which still had the older variety of wooden sashes.

Car heating equipment was as follows: 1927 series – 6004–6038AB had P. Smith heaters, and 6038C–6070 had Gold Car Heating Co. heaters. 1928 series – 6071–6095 had Gold Car Heating Co. heaters, and 6096–6120 had P. Smith heaters.

Some features mentioned regarding the A/B Standards appeared in a few of these cars as well:

During the 1930s, 6107 was equipped with gum dispensing machines. Around the same time, 6017 had been involved in a major accident and was repaired, displaying brass strips across the floor typical of later cars acquired by the city.

Following the experimental paint schemes being tested during the late 1940s on a few A/B Standards, 6028 as well had a dark green and gray interior.

Beginning in 1956, the painted on numbers on most cars were supplanted by number plates.

Under the TA, 6044 was modified to have only one running light fixture, but headlights were never installed on this unit.

In 1964, a few cars from different series were tested with paper numbers for better visibility from track level for yard personnel. Four of these units, 6023, 6076, 6077, 6097, received these, one in the center of each section below a window.
