= MS Multi-section car (New York City Subway car) =

Retired class of New York City Subway car

Multi-section car
- Multi-section 7014 in Coney Island Yard
- Manufacturers: Pullman (7014–7028, Green Hornet); St. Louis Car Company (7004–7013); Budd (Zephyr)
- Constructed: 1934–1936
- Scrapped: 1942 (Green Hornet only); 1959–1961
- Number built: 27 cars
- Number preserved: 0
- Number scrapped: 27
- Successor: R27 and R30
- Formation: Five-section articulated units
- Fleet numbers: Zephyr: 7029 (originally 7002/7003); Production cars: 7004–7028; Green Hornet: 7003 (originally 7000/7001)
- Capacity: Zephyr: 170 (seated) 496 (standing); Green Hornet: 184 (seated) 490 (standing); Production cars: 198 (seated) 514 (standing)
- Operators: Brooklyn–Manhattan Transit Corporation; NYC Board of Transportation; New York City Transit Authority

Specifications
- Car body construction: Steel
- Car length: Zephyr: 168 ft 6 in (51.36 m); Green Hornet: 170 ft (51.82 m); Production cars: 179 ft 4 in (54.66 m)
- Width: Zephyr & Green Hornet: 10 ft (3.05 m) over thresholds; Production cars: 10 ft 10 in (3.30 m) over thresholds
- Height: Green Hornet & production cars: 12 ft (3.66 m); Zephyr: 11 ft 7.5 in (3.54 m)
- Floor height: 3 ft 2 1/8 in (0.97 m)
- Doors: 6
- Maximum speed: 60 mph (97 km/h)
- Weight: 170,610 lb (77,387 kg) (Green Hornet); 159,250 lb (72,235 kg) (Zephyr); 180,830 lb (82,023 kg) (production cars)
- Traction system: Motor car: Westinghouse M1431A, 1433, General Electric 1196A1, 1186 Air Compressor: Westinghouse XD29 P.C.C. Multi-Notch 47 pts (Green Hornet, and St. Louis Car production cars), General Electric 17KG39A1 (Pullman Standard production cars), 17KG21A (Zephyr "C" car), 17KM1C (Zephyr "A, A1" cars)
- Prime mover: Electric motor
- Power output: 70 hp (52 kW)
- Electric systems: 600 V DC third rail
- Current collection: Top running contact shoe
- Braking system: WABCO Schedule AMSF or AMCE
- Coupling system: WABCO H2A
- Headlight type: incandescent light bulbs
- Track gauge: 4 ft 8 1/2 in (1,435 mm)

The MS Multi-section was a series of New York City Subway cars. They were built in prototype form in 1934 with production models built in 1936. Built by the Budd, Pullman, and St. Louis car companies, they were called "Multis" for short. They were so named because each car was an articulated car made of five sections; though the MS Multi-section fleet's lengths differed, their average length was 170 ft (52 m).

The MS Multi-section fleet consisted of 27 cars. The two prototype cars were the Zephyr, manufactured by the Budd Company, and the Green Hornet, manufactured by the Pullman Company; the latter were scrapped during World War II. The 25 production cars were made by the Pullman and St. Louis companies and remained in service until 1961. None of the MS Multi-section cars survive today.

== Background ==
The MS was an articulated car made up of five sections. Their average length was 170 ft (52 m), making them the longest articulated units ever used in the history of the BMT.

The first two cars delivered were pilot cars. One was manufactured by the Pullman-Standard Company, and the other by the Budd Company, originally delivered in 1934 a few months apart. The Pullman-Standard's version was known as the Green Hornet, while Budd's was called the Zephyr, both names being unofficial.

The Green Hornet and the 25 production cars had two double-leaf doors on each section (10 doors per unit), while the Zephyr had four single-leaf doors on each section (20 doors per unit). These cars were in production at the same time as the Union Pacific M-10000 and the Budd Pioneer Zephyr for the CB&Q. Testing of these cars proved successful, and the BMT ordered a further 25 cars, 15 from Pullman and 10 from St. Louis Car Co.

== History ==
=== Prototypes ===
The Green Hornet and the Zephyr, originally numbered 7000A/8000B/9000C/8001B1/7001A1 and 7002A/8002B/9001C/8003B1/7003A1 respectively, were delivered in 1934, few months apart. The two units were initially tested on the Fulton Street elevated for comparison, and when the tests were concluded, they were relegated to Franklin Avenue Shuttle service, almost never appearing in through service to Brighton Beach or Coney Island except occasionally for put-ins (out-of-service trains re-inserted in revenue service) or layups (out-of-service trains stored on unused yard or express tracks). In 1937, the Green Hornet was renumbered to 7003, and the Zephyr was renumbered to 7029.

The BMT Green Hornet at the Pullman-Standard plant in Chicago, IL

The BMT Zephyr in Coney Island Yard

The Green Hornet had undergone some slight modifications, and the BMT management hoped to eventually run it in consists with the Pullman-Standard built multi-units. However, with the onset of World War II, the Green Hornet was removed from service in February 1941 after barely 7 years in service and scrapped in 1942 for its valuable aluminum body. The unit had been plagued by master controller problems and was only in service for three years before it was withdrawn after maintenance revealed two cracked trucks. The Zephyr had a much better service record and remained in service on the Franklin Avenue Shuttle until it was retired in August 1954. The unit was then scrapped in 1959.

=== Production cars ===
The 25 production cars were built by the St. Louis Car Company and Pullman-Standard. Units 7004–7013 A-B-C-B1-A1 were built by the St. Louis Car Company, while units 7014–7028 A-B-C-B1-A1 were built by Pullman. They were introduced in 1936 but were quickly withdrawn from service for truck modifications. The St. Louis built units over the years were particularly troublesome in that regard. Despite all issues, the production cars were returned to service one year later and began serving on the 14th St.–Canarsie Line. Due to their lightweight metal construction, the units were enabled to run both in the subway and on the old els that regular steel subway cars were too heavy for. This induced the BMT management to set up a service specially for these units, namely the 14th St.–Fulton St. Line. The trains ran from the 14th St. Line as far as Atlantic Ave. and then out along the Fulton St. Line to Lefferts Blvd. This latter service ended in April 1956 when the IND took over the outer portion of this line. Over the previous year, the units had been reduced to rush hour service only.

In 1956, the painted-on exterior numbers were supplanted by number plates on many units.

In December 1956, the cars were transferred to Myrtle–Chambers service for purposes of cutting their mileage, as was commonly done at the time with all oddball types of equipment. One train, in addition, ran in the Broadway "short line" service. In February 1958, a few units underwent a one-week stint in Franklin Avenue service (shuttle and on the last day, a Sunday, local to Brighton Beach). They were finally retired from service on September 5, 1961, replaced by the R27s and R30s. All were scrapped later that year.

== Additional information ==
The MS was notable for its rapid acceleration rate (4 mph/s or 6.4 km/(h⋅s) for the Green Hornet and the 25 production cars, and 5 mph/s or 8.0 km/(h⋅s) for the Zephyr) and its "balancing speed" — the maximum speed attainable on level track, running empty — was relatively high (53 mph or 85 km/h for the Green Hornet, 55 mph or 89 km/h for the Zephyr, and 58 mph or 93 km/h for the 25 production units).

The Zephyr holds the title of being the first stainless steel subway car in the city, preceding the R32 – the first bulk order of stainless-steel cars in New York City Subway history – by thirty years. Prior to the R32, Budd went on to build the R11 prototypes in 1949. Unlike the other prototypes and the production units, the Zephyr was built without couplers, so it could only operate as a single unit.

The Green Hornet subway car was among the first subway cars to incorporate a warning tone that sounds before the doors begin to close as the train prepares to leave the station. Door chimes would not become standard for all subway cars until the R44 order in 1971.
