= R268 (New York City Subway car) =

Proposed New York City Subway car

- In service: 2028 (expected)
- Manufacturer: Kawasaki Railcar Manufacturing
- Family name: NTT (New Technology Train)
- Replaced: All remaining R68s; All R68As; Displaced R211As on the C line (all planned)
- Number under construction: 378
- Number built: 0
- Number in service: 0
- Formation: 22 four-car sets (two B cars) (88 cars); 58 five-car sets (three B cars); (290 cars)
- Operator: New York City Subway

Specifications
- Train length: 4-car set: 240 ft 10.08 in (73.4080 m); 5-car set: 301 ft 0.6 in (91.760 m); 8-car train (two 4-car sets): 481 ft 8.16 in (146.8161 m); 10-car train (two 5-car sets): 602 ft 1.2 in (183.520 m)
- Car length: 60.21 ft (18.35 m)
- Width: 10 ft (3,048 mm) max
- Height: 12 ft (3,658 mm) max
- Floor height: 3.76 ft (1.15 m)
- Platform height: 3.76 ft (1.15 m)
- Entry: Level
- Doors: 8 sets of side doors per car
- Electric systems: Third rail, 625 V DC
- Current collection: Contact shoe
- Safety systems: CBTC, dead man's switch, train stop
- Headlight type: LED
- Track gauge: 4 ft 8 1/2 in (1,435 mm) standard gauge

The R268 is an upcoming class of New Technology Train (NTT) subway cars built for the New York City Transit Authority. They are to be built by Kawasaki Railcar Manufacturing for the B Division of the New York City Subway and will replace all remaining R68 and R68A subway cars. The order will have a similar design to the R211 fleet.

A request for proposal for pre-contract awards was issued in June 2023, and a sole source advertisement for the contract was released in September 2025. The contract was awarded on October 29, 2025.

== Features ==
This order will make the B Division all NTTs, which are 60 feet (18 m) long and compatible with modern communications-based train control signaling. The fleet will replace all remaining R68 and all R68A subway cars. The contract calls for 378 cars to be manufactured by Kawasaki Railcar Manufacturing, which manufactured the R211 fleet to nearly identical specifications. Of these, 290 cars will be arranged in five-car sets, and 88 of the cars will be arranged in four-car sets. The four-car sets will return the C route to fully eight-car 484 feet (148 m)-long trains, instead of a mixture of eight-car R179 and ten-car R211 trains.

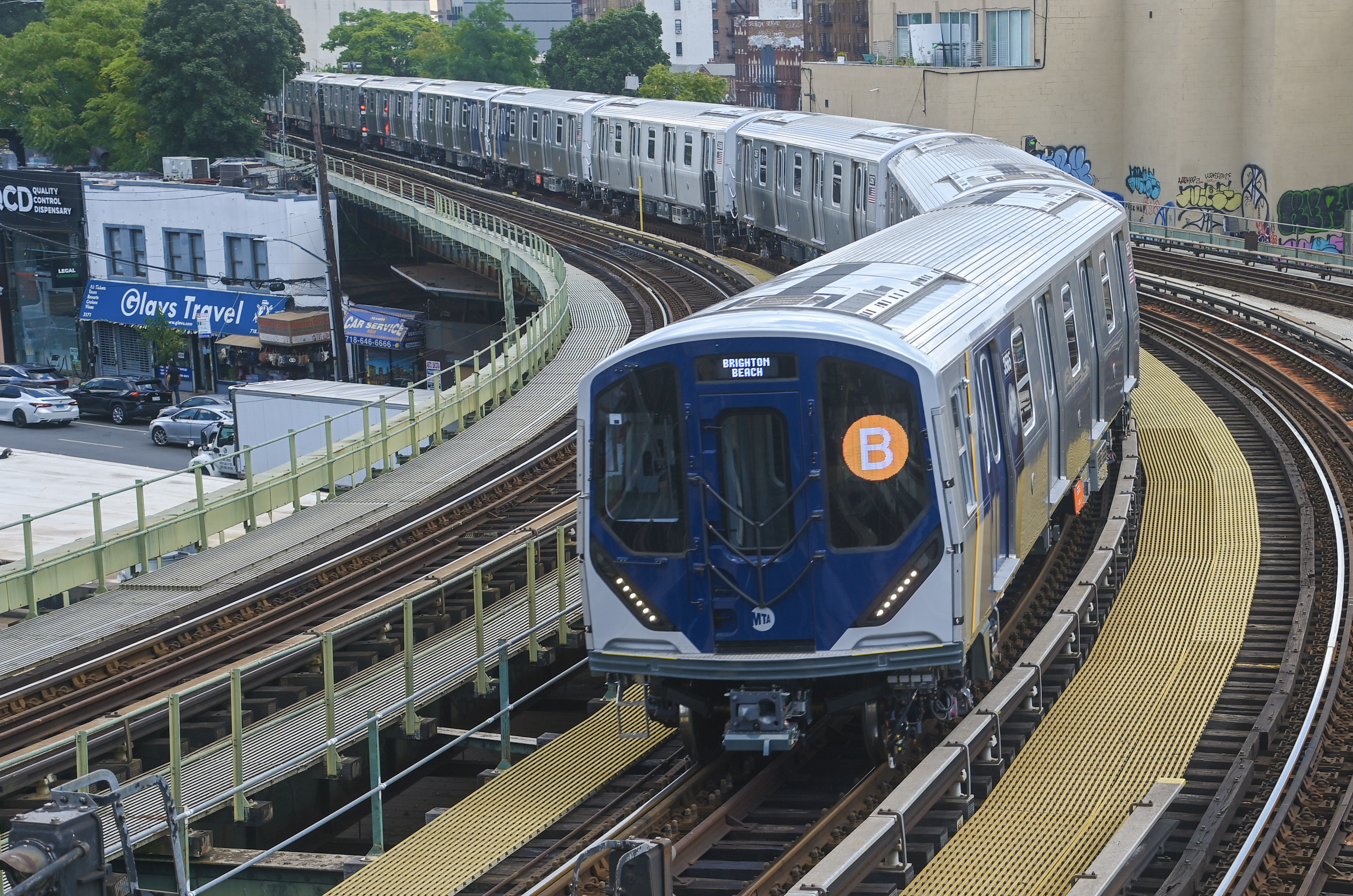
The design of the R268 is expected to be similar to the R211

Similar to the current R211, and the future R262, this subway car model would feature advanced technology. At the ends of the train, it would display a large LED screen with the route bullet, similar to the front rollsigns on older trains (R40 to R68A). The train's destination will be displayed above the door on the front. The cars would have wider doors, security cameras, and brighter lighting.

== History ==
In December 2022, the President of Kawasaki Heavy Industries, Yasuhiko Hashimoto, in a presentation, said that Kawasaki had a great opportunity to get orders from the Metropolitan Transportation Authority (MTA) on the upcoming R262 and R268 orders. In June 2023, the MTA issued a request for proposals on pre-contract awards for the R262 and R268 fleets. In August 2023, a $3.5 million project was broken out using funding from the MTA's 2020-2024 Capital Program to fund design work for the R268 order.

The November 2023 Department of Subways Rail Fleet Asset Management Plan stated that the R268 order would consist of 388 or 390 cars, depending on the number of five-car consists in R211 Option 2. The contract was expected to be awarded in 2025, with cars entering service between 2029 and 2031. The document said the plan was for the order to include cars to enable an expansion of the fleet if ridership recovery from the COVID-19 pandemic was in the agency's middle-range scenario, with an option order for 135 cars for a high-recovery scenario. Another option was to order those cars later in a separate contract or bundled with the future replacement of the R143 cars.

On September 18, 2024, the MTA released its 2025-2029 Capital Program, which included plans to allocate $1.775 billion for the purchase of 355 new cars to replace the remaining R68s and R68As, which were built in the late-1980s. In May 2025, it was announced that Hatch Jacobs Partners, a joint venture of Hatch and Jacobs, won the contract for consulting services for the R262 and R268 orders.

On September 5, 2025, the MTA issued a sole source advertisement for 378 R268 cars from Kawasaki Railcar Manufacturing using the design of the R211 fleet. The earliest award date for the contract was listed as September 29, 2025. The order would consist of 290 cars in five-car units and 88 cars in four-car units. On October 29, 2025, it was announced that Kawasaki Railcar Manufacturing will build the cars for an estimated $1.5 billion. Delivery is slated to take place between September 2028 and May 2030. The MTA said opting for a non-competitive procurement over a competitive one would speed up the retirement of the R68A fleet by about four years.
