= ME-1 (New York City Subway car) =

Retired class of New York City Subway car

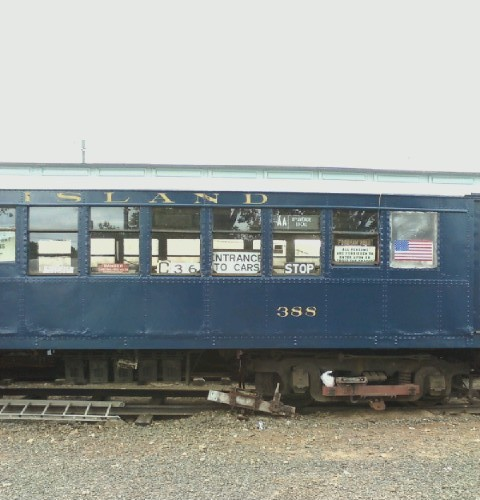
- SIRT ME-1 Car 388 on display at the Shore Line Trolley Museum in 2010.
- In service: 1925–1973
- Manufacturer: Standard Steel Car Company
- Constructed: 1925–1926
- Number built: 100 (90 Motors, 10 Trailers)
- Number preserved: 2
- Number scrapped: 98
- Successor: R44
- Formation: Single units
- Fleet numbers: 300–389 (motors); 500–509 (trailers) Note: Trailers 502, 505–507, and 509 converted to motor cars 390–394 in 1928
- Capacity: 240: 71 (seated) 169 (standing)
- Operators: Staten Island Railway; New York City Transit Authority

Specifications
- Car body construction: Steel
- Car length: 67 ft 3 in (20.50 m)
- Width: 10 ft 0 in (3,048 mm)
- Height: 12 ft 1.125 in (3,686 mm)
- Floor height: 3 ft 9.125 in (1.15 m)
- Doors: 6
- Maximum speed: 60 mph (97 km/h)
- Weight: Motor car: 95,750 lb (43,430 kg); Trailer car: N/A
- Traction system: Motor car: GE PC 10L using GE 282A motors (200 hp each). 2 motors per car (1 per truck). Trailer car: None
- Power output: 200 hp (149 kW) per traction motor
- Electric systems: 600 V DC third rail
- Current collection: Top running Contact shoe
- Braking systems: WABCO Schedule AMUE with UE-5 universal valve, ME-30 brake stand, and simplex clasp brake rigging
- Coupling system: WABCO H2A
- Track gauge: 4 ft 8 1/2 in (1,435 mm) standard gauge

The ME-1 (also known as MU-1 or MUE-1) was an electric multiple unit subway car built from 1925 to 1926 by the Standard Steel Car Company for the Staten Island Rapid Transit Railway Company and later also used in the New York City Subway. 100 cars were built, numbered 300–389 (motors), and 500–509 (trailers). They were the first electric cars to run in revenue service on the SIRT.

The ME-1s entered service in 1925 and ran continuously on all three SIRT lines. Sometime between 1953 and 1954, 25 cars were purchased by the New York City Transit Authority to run on the subway. Numbered 2900–2924, these cars were nicknamed B-29s, a reference to a large aircraft of the same name, due to their large size (67 feet or 20.42 meters) and the fact that they had been renumbered for subway service into the 2900s. The NYCT cars continued to run until 1961, when they were replaced by the R27s and R30s. The SIRT cars lasted until 1973, when they were replaced by the R44s. Two cars were preserved, while the rest were scrapped.

== Service history ==
A total of 100 cars were purchased from the Standard Steel Car Company – 90 motors and 10 trailers. The 90 motors were built in 1925, and the 10 trailers in 1926. Five trailer cars were later rebuilt as motors in 1928 as replacements for five motor cars destroyed in a fire at St. George.

Purchased by the Staten Island Rapid Transit's former operator, the Baltimore and Ohio Railroad, the cars were built to replace steam-powered equipment on the railroad, and in preparation for the Staten Island Tunnel connection to the BMT Fourth Avenue Line in Brooklyn. Because of this, the cars were built to Brooklyn–Manhattan Transit Corporation (BMT) subway specifications, and strongly resembled the BMT's AB Standard. The cars debuted in 1925, shortly after the electrification of the railroad. They ran continuously on the three SIRT lines (North Shore Line, South Shore Line, South Beach Branch) until 1953, when the South Beach Branch and North Shore Line closed.

In 1953–54, 25 of these cars were purchased from the SIRT by the New York City Transit Authority to run over former BMT lines and underwent extensive modifications. They first made an appearance in service on October 3, 1955, in the truncated Culver Line service, running between Ditmas Ave. and Chambers St. on weekdays and as a shuttle between Ditmas Ave. and 36th St. other times. The five trailers that were not rebuilt to powered cars were also purchased to be used as yard offices.

The reduction of Culver operation to a full time shuttle between Ditmas Ave. and 9th Ave. in May 1959 created a surplus of these cars, and the additional cars now available were used on the Franklin Ave. Shuttle (never in-through service to Brighton Beach or Coney Island except for put-in or layup trips). The full fleet was released altogether in August 1959 with the arrival of modified Low-Vs from the IRT Division to operate in those two shuttle services. The ex-SIRT cars were thereupon placed in the West End–Nassau St. Local service and remained there until April 17, 1961, replaced by the R27s and R30s.

The remaining 48 cars (many had been lost in several fires) ran on the remaining SIRT Main Line. Due to the shortage of equipment, all but four cars would be used in peak operation. They continued to run until 1973, when they were finally replaced by the R44s.

Two cars have been preserved:

- Car 388 – Shore Line Trolley Museum in East Haven, Connecticut.
- Car 366 – Seashore Trolley Museum in Kennebunkport, Maine.

Car 353 had survived on a track in the Travis Yards and was acquired by the Trolley Museum of New York, based in Kingston, New York. However, the car was scrapped sometime around 2004 or 2005 before transportation was able to be arranged to Kingston.

== See also ==
- AB Standard, a similar car built for the New York City Subway by both the Pressed Steel Car Company and by the American Car and Foundry Company.
