= Rail adhesion car =

Vehicle used on a rail adhesion system

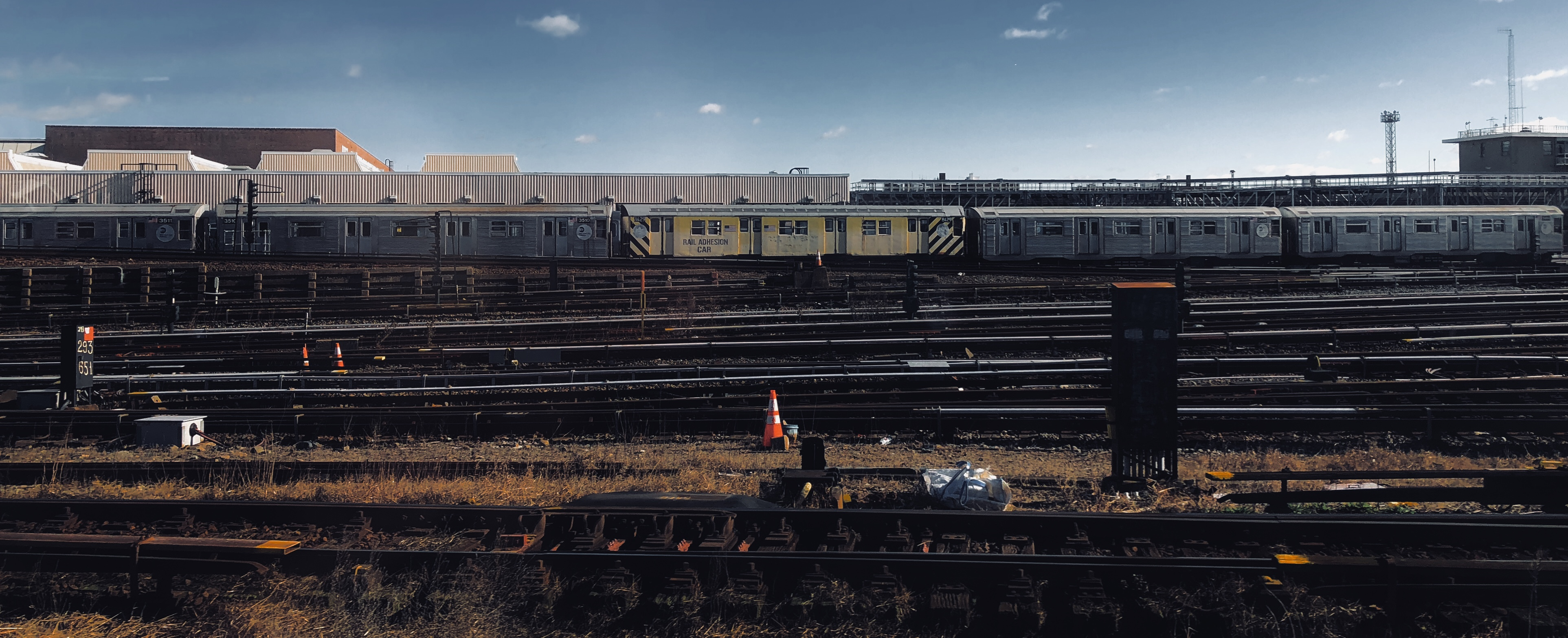
One of the New York City Subway rail adhesion cars with R32 work cars

A rail adhesion car or rail adhesion train is a modified vehicle used on a rail adhesion system where the standard equipment does not have locomotives' rail sanding ability. In particular, it may involve tanks and dispensing equipment installed in an electric subway or rail car that is run over the rails alone or in a train to dispense sand when needed. Because of space limits under the cars, the sand or gel/sand mix tanks are installed inside the passenger space.

In the New York City Subway, for example, rail adhesion cars were created from older equipment. As of 2013, three such cars existed in the subway system:

- 8429 – a former R30 subway car based at Coney Island Yard in southern Brooklyn. This car is normally used on the BMT Franklin Avenue Line, BMT Brighton Line, and the BMT Sea Beach Line, where tracks run in open-cut sections and where leaves, snow, and ice deposit onto the tracks.
- 8558 – also a former R30 subway car based at Pitkin Yard in East New York, Brooklyn. This car is normally used on the IND Rockaway Line, which runs on what was Long Island Rail Road's trackage to the Rockaways in Queens.
- 8885 – a former R33 subway car based at Unionport Yard in The Bronx. This car is normally used on the IRT Dyre Avenue Line, which runs on the part of the right of way of the former New York, Westchester and Boston Railway.

== See also ==
- Sandbox (locomotive)
- Sandite
