= R68A (New York City Subway car) =

Class of New York City Subway car

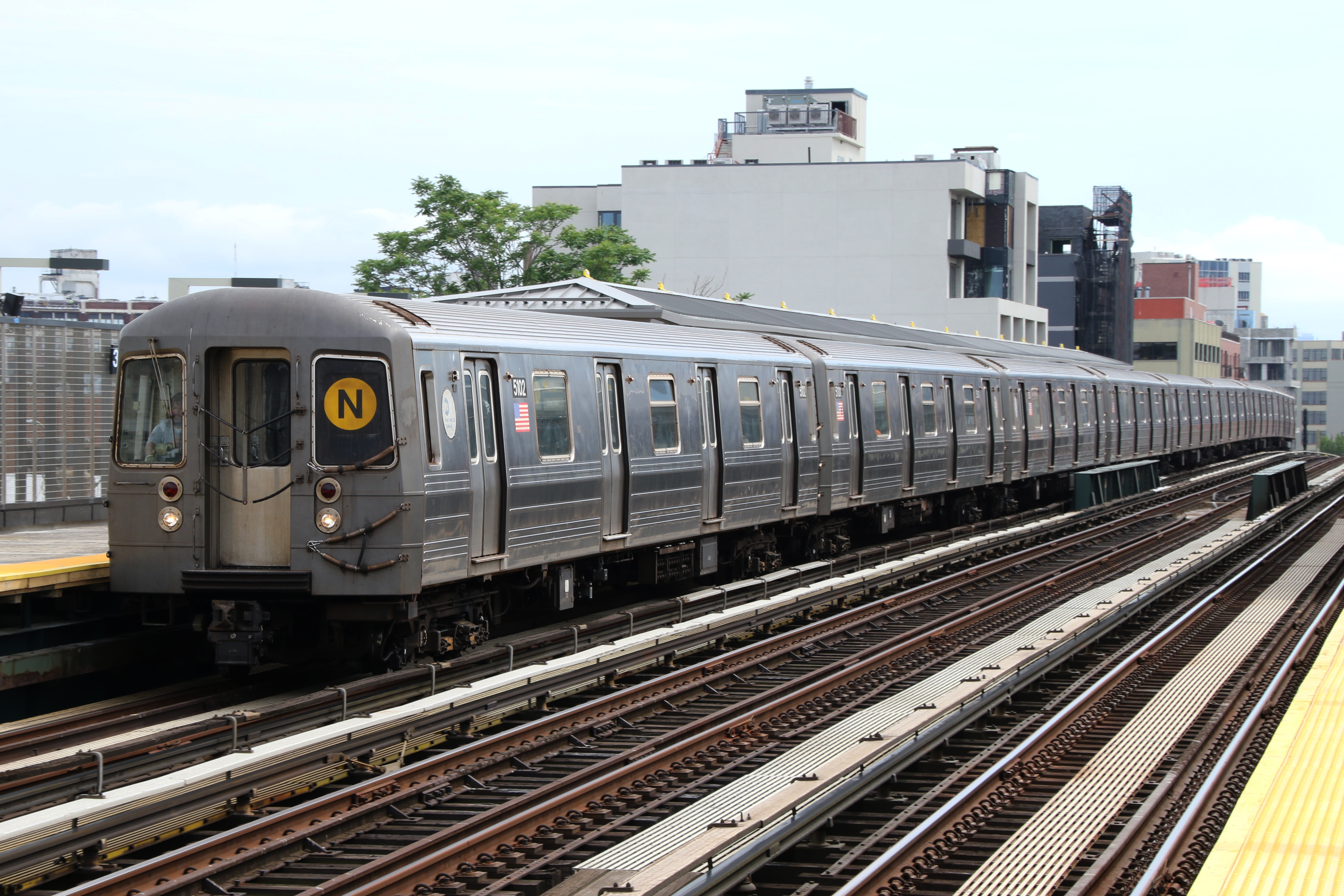
- An R68A train on the N at 36th Avenue

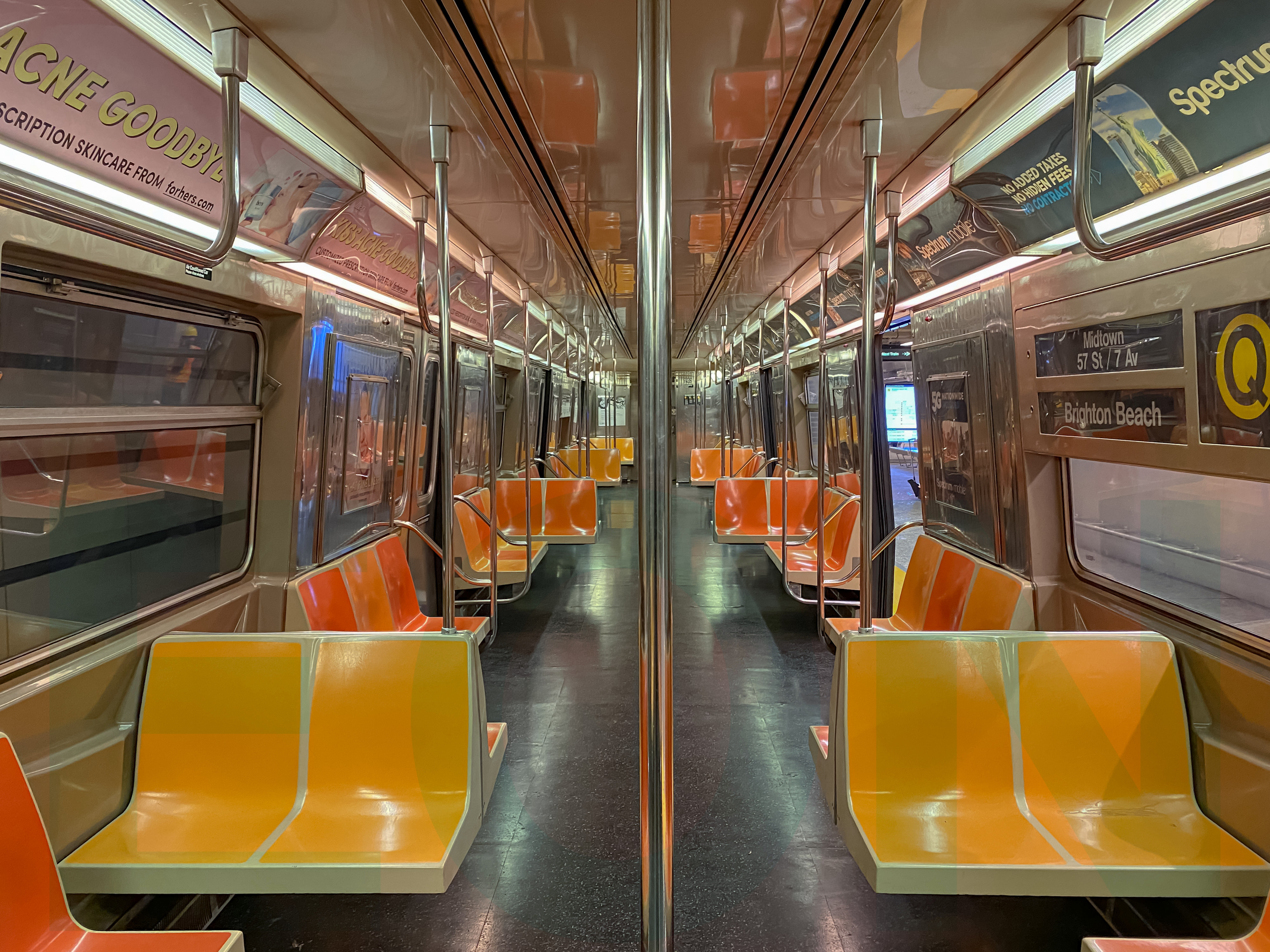
- Interior of an R68A car
- Stock type: Electric multiple unit
- In service: May 18, 1988 – present (38 years)
- Manufacturer: Kawasaki Heavy Industries
- Assembly: Yonkers, New York (final assembly)
- Built at: Kobe, Japan
- Family name: SMEE
- Replaced: All remaining R10s, R27s, and R30s
- Constructed: 1988–1989
- Entered service: May 18, 1988
- Number built: 200
- Number in service: 200
- Successor: R268
- Formation: 4 cars per trainset
- Fleet numbers: 5001–5200
- Capacity: 70 (seated)
- Operator: New York City Subway
- Depot: Coney Island Yard
- Services assigned: (Updated June 30, 2024)

Specifications
- Car body construction: stainless steel with fiberglass end bonnets
- Train length: 4 car train: 300 feet (91.44 m); 8 car train: 600 feet (182.88 m)
- Car length: 74 ft 8.5 in (22.77 m) (over anticlimbers)
- Width: 10 ft (3,048 mm) (over threshold)
- Height: 12.08 ft (3,682 mm)
- Platform height: 3.76 ft (1.15 m)
- Doors: 8 sets of 50-inch (1,270 mm) wide side doors per car
- Maximum speed: 55 mph (89 km/h)
- Weight: 92,720 lb (42,057 kg)
- Traction system: E-Cam control (Adtranz)
- Traction motors: 115 hp (85.8 kW) 1447J DC motor (Westinghouse)
- Acceleration: 2.5 mph/s (4.0 km/(h⋅s))
- Electric systems: Third rail, 625 V DC
- Current collection: Contact shoe
- Braking systems: WABCO (dynamic and friction), WABCO tread brake rigging model TBU GR90
- Safety systems: dead man's switch, tripcock
- Coupling system: Westinghouse H2C
- Headlight type: halogen light bulbs
- Track gauge: 4 ft 8 1/2 in (1,435 mm) standard gauge

The R68A is a B Division New York City Subway car order consisting of 200 cars built between 1988 and 1989 by Kawasaki Railcar Company in Kobe, Japan, with final assembly done at the Kawasaki plant in Yonkers, New York. A total of 200 cars were built, arranged in four-car sets.

The R68A was the fourth and final R-type contract to be built with 75-foot (22.86 m) cars (the previous three being the R44, R46, and R68). The contract had been given to Kawasaki because the manufacturers of the base R68 order, the joint venture Westinghouse-Amrail Company, had experienced significant integration issues that led to performance problems with the R68s. The first R68A train entered service on May 18, 1988. The R68As are scheduled to remain in service until at least 2025–2030.

== Description ==
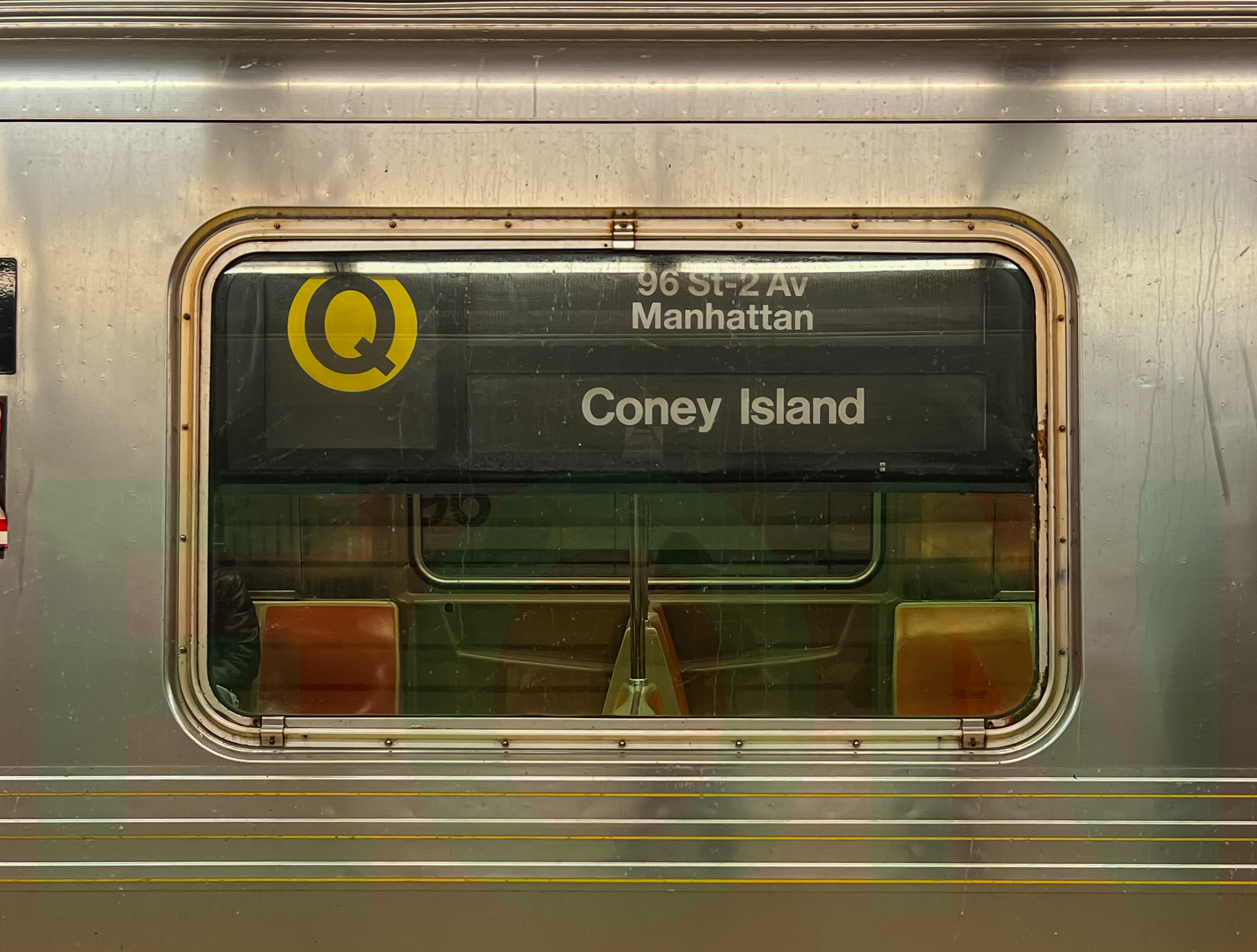
Side destination and route rollsigns of an R68A

The R68As are numbered 5001–5200. They were the last cars to be built with a length of 75 feet (22.86 m) (the previous three being the R44, R46, and R68). While the 75-foot (22.86 m) length allows more room for sitting and standing passengers per car than the 60-foot (18.29 m) length that was previously used, these cars suffer from clearance issues and cannot run on the BMT Eastern Division. Additionally, the reduced number of doors on a train of eight 75-foot (22.86 m) cars have led to increased boarding and dwelling times. As a result, subsequent B Division subway car orders have returned to the previous length of 60 feet (18.29 m), the first being the R143 order in 2001.

The R68As are currently based out of the Coney Island Yard and are assigned to the N, Q, and W, and occasionally run on the B. Like the previous R68 order, the R68As were originally single units, with a full-width cab on one end and a half-width cab on the other end. They were eventually linked into four-car sets and continue to run in this configuration.

== History ==
=== Delivery and revenue service ===
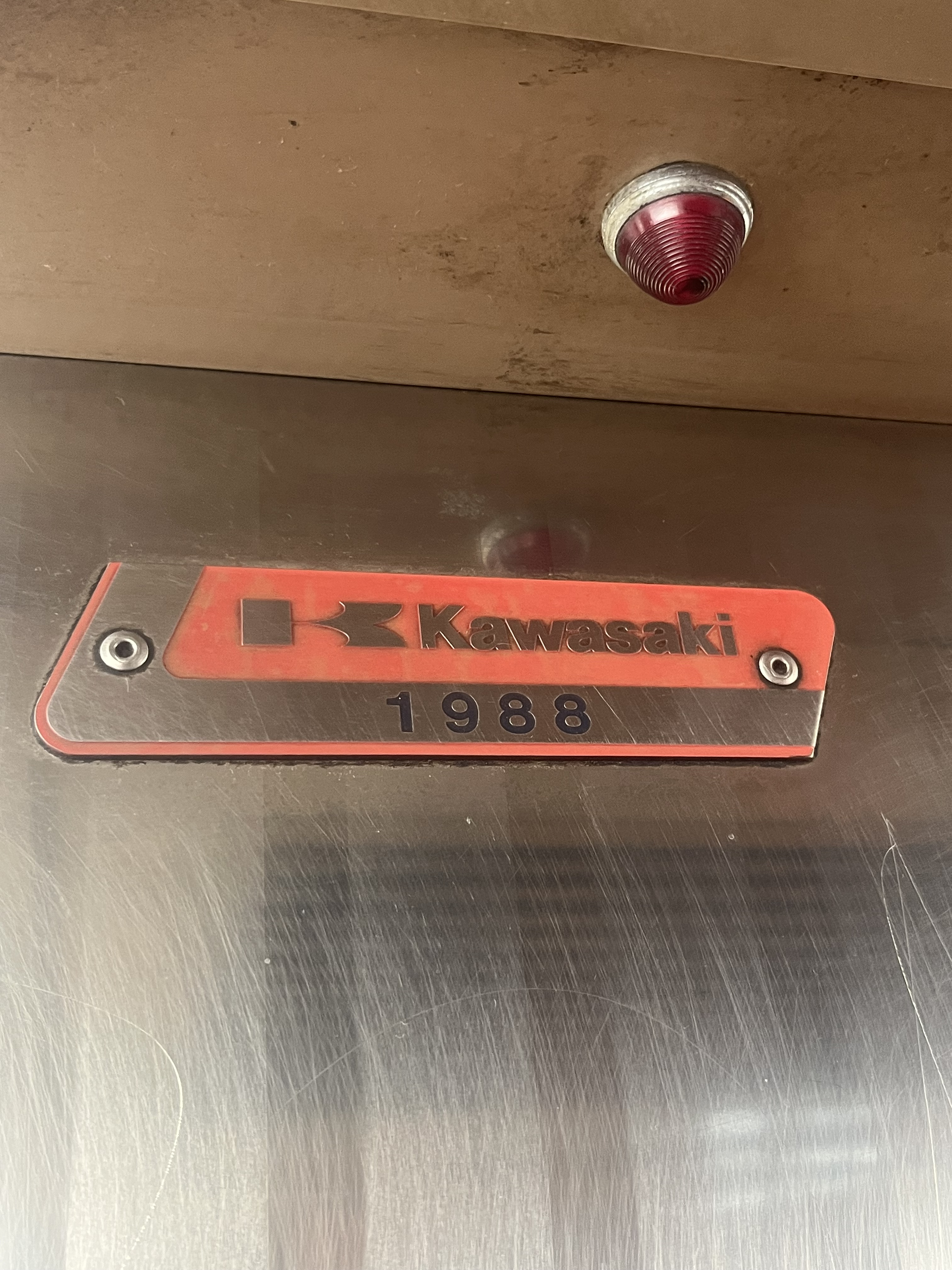
Builders plate of the R68A

The first R68A cars were delivered to New York on April 12, 1988, and transferred to TA facilities the following day. The cars replaced all of the remaining R10s, R27s, and unrebuilt R30s, all of which were retired between 1989 and 1993. The R68As were built with American and Japanese parts.

The R68As' first entry to revenue service was on May 18, 1988, on the Bronx and Manhattan half of the divided D train with the first fleet consisting of the consist 5010-5001-5006-5008-5009-5007-5004-5005. Originally, the R68A order was supposed to be a second option order of the R68. However, due to poor performance from the R68 cars produced by Westinghouse-Amrail, along with other issues, the MTA gave the order to Kawasaki, with an offer of $958,000 per car versus Westinghouse-Amrail's offer of $1,012,200 per car.

=== Replacement ===
The R68As are scheduled to remain in service until at least 2025–30. In 2010, the MTA proposed mid-life technological upgrades for the R68As, including LED destination signs and automated announcements. These upgrades were not implemented.

In June 2023, the MTA released a document advertising an RFP for the R262 and R268 models, the latter of which is likely to replace the R68 and R68A. In September 2024, the MTA further indicated that a handful of R68 and R68A cars would be retired by R211 cars. The MTA also wanted to replace the rest of the R68 and R68A fleet with 355 new 60-foot-long (18 m) cars, thereby retiring the last remaining 75-foot-long (23 m) cars in the New York City Subway system's revenue fleet.

== See also ==
- R68 (New York City Subway car), the first order
