= R30 (New York City Subway car) =

Retired class of New York City Subway car

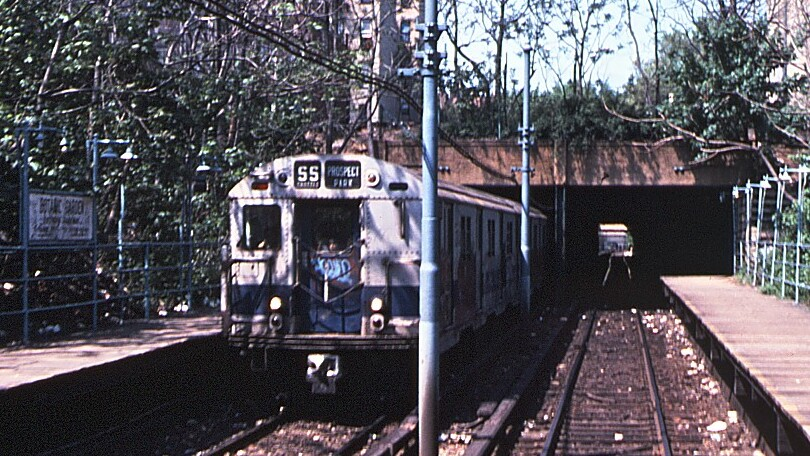
- R30s in service on the Franklin Avenue Shuttle in the 1970s

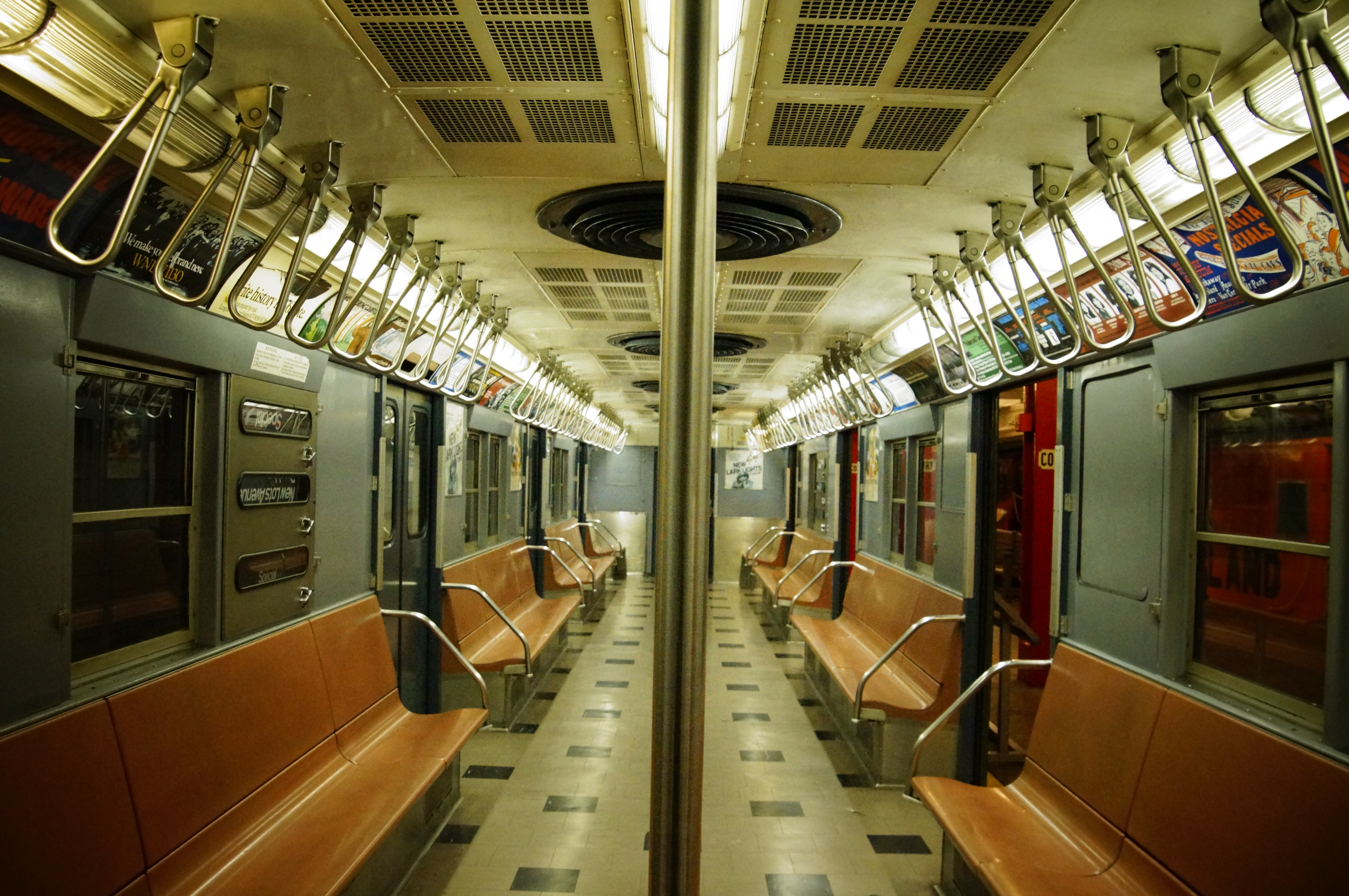
- Interior view of R30 car 8506
- In service: 1961 – June 25, 1993 (32 years)
- Manufacturer: St. Louis Car Company
- Family name: Redbirds
- Replaced: Some BMT Standards; Many BMT D Triplex Units; BMT New York City ME-1 units; BMT Multi-section units; Many older BMT elevated equipment
- Constructed: 1961–1962
- Entered service: 1961
- Refurbished: 1985–1989
- Scrapped: 1989–1993, 2007–2010, 2013
- Number built: 320
- Number in service: (2 in work service)
- Number preserved: 3
- Number scrapped: 315
- Successor: R68A
- Formation: Married Pairs
- Fleet numbers: 8250–8351, 8412–8567 (R30); 8352–8411 (R30A)
- Capacity: 56 (seated) 152 (standing)
- Operator: New York City Subway

Specifications
- Car body construction: LAHT Carbon steel
- Car length: 60 ft (18.29 m)
- Width: 10 ft (3.05 m)
- Height: 12.08 ft (3.68 m)
- Platform height: 3.76 ft (1.15 m)
- Doors: 8 sets of 45 inch wide side doors per car
- Maximum speed: 55 mph (89 km/h)
- Weight: 80,600 lb (36,560 kg)
- Traction system: General Electric (GE) 1257
- Traction motors: Westinghouse XCA248 and General Electric MCM 17KG192A
- Transmission: SCM propulsion system
- Auxiliaries: WH 1447 JR; GE 1257F1
- Electric systems: 600 V DC third rail
- Current collection: Contact shoe
- Braking system: WABCO ME42B SMEE
- Track gauge: 4 ft 8 1/2 in (1,435 mm) standard gauge

The R30 was a New York City Subway car model built by St. Louis Car Company from 1961 to 1962. The cars were a "follow-up" or supplemental stock for the B Division's R27s and closely resembled them. A total of 320 cars were built, arranged in married pairs. Three versions were manufactured: Westinghouse (WH)-powered cars, General Electric (GE)-powered cars, and R30As.

The first R30s entered service in 1961. Various modifications were made over the years to the R30 fleet, and most of the fleet was refurbished in 1985–1989 with a "Redbird" paint scheme. The WH-powered cars were not rebuilt, being replaced by the R68A fleet, and the last train of WH-powered cars ran in passenger service on December 14, 1990. The overhauled R30s and the R30As were planned to run until 1997, but the cars were prematurely phased out starting in 1992 due to the difficulty of installing air-conditioning; the last overhauled R30s ran in passenger service on June 25, 1993. Some R30 cars were saved for various purposes, but most were scrapped.

== Description ==
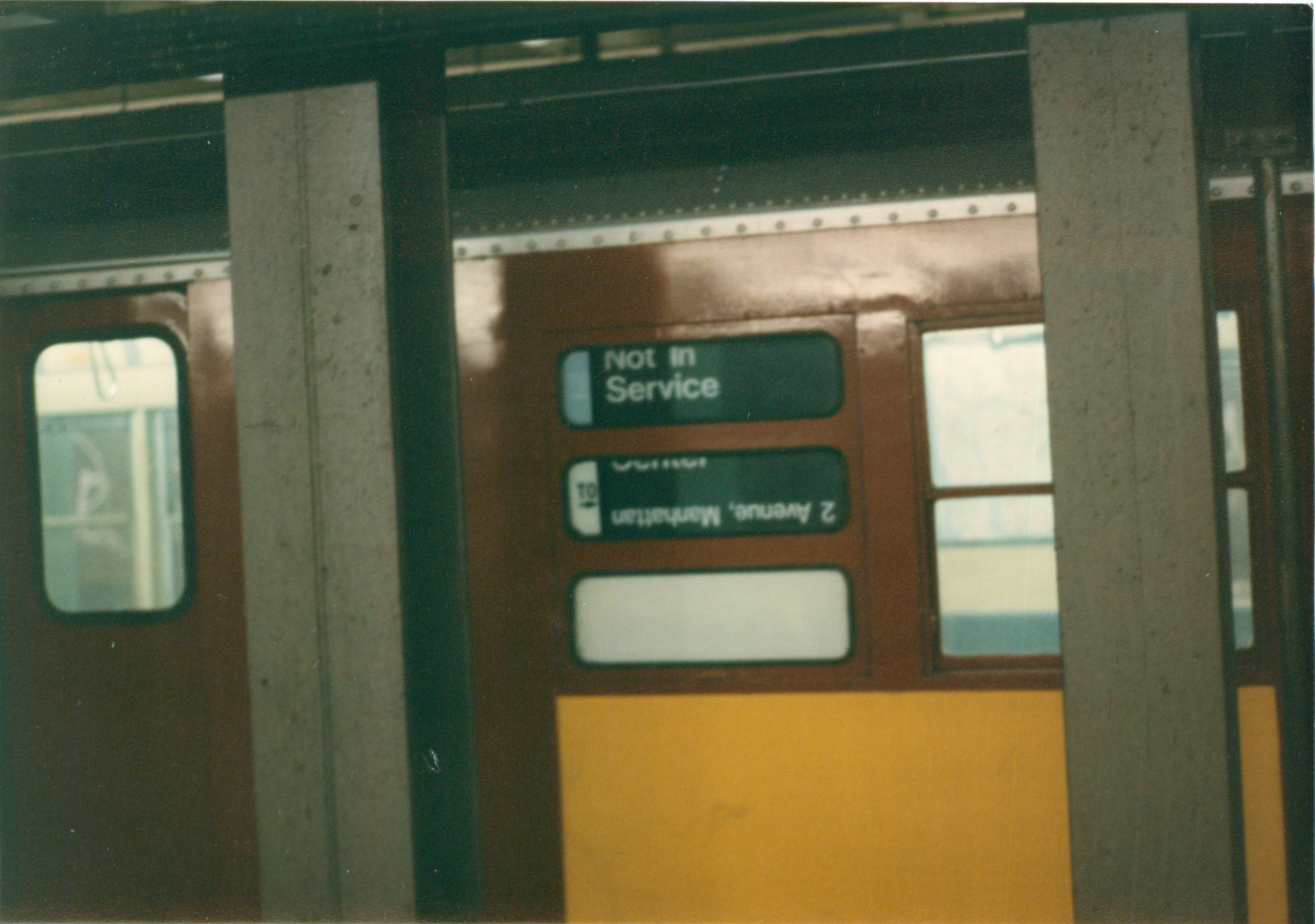
Side route and destination rollsigns of an R30 car

The R30 cars were numbered 8250–8569, and they were coupled together as married pairs.

These cars, along with their identical R27 sister cars, replaced the oldest BMT A/B Standards (including all 50 of the trailer cars), the ME-1s purchased and transferred from the SIRT, the MS Multi-section cars, and the IRT Lo-Vs that were modified to be used on B-division shuttles. They helped to stabilize the BMT Division to a certain extent until the R32 cars were delivered to the BMT lines in 1964–1965.

There were three versions of the R30: Westinghouse (WH) XCA248-powered equipped cars (8412–8569), General Electric (GE) MCM-powered cars (8250–8351), and R30As (8352–8411), which were equipped with newer solid-state GE SCM controllers instead.

The R30 cars were often used in mixed pairs with other SMEE-type trains, especially with the R27s. These cars were also the last B Division trains to be built with LAHT Carbon Steel, as the R32s (the next car model built for the B Division), was built with stainless steel.

== History ==
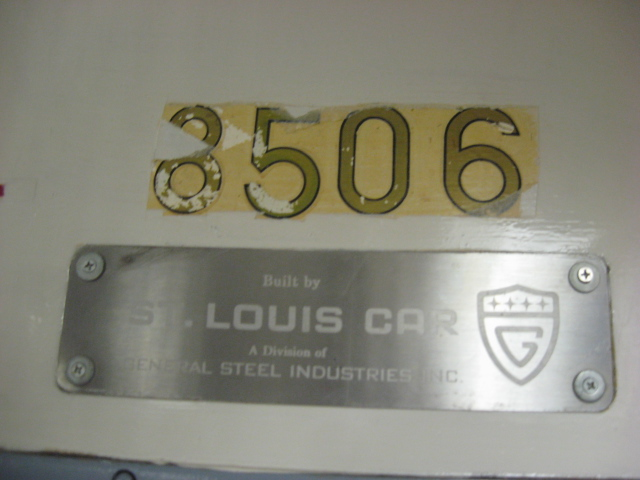
Builders plate of the R30 cars

The R30s were primarily BMT Southern Division cars, although they would appear in the Eastern Division from time to time.

Like the R27s, the R30s wore several paint schemes over the course of their career. The cars were delivered in a dark olive green paint scheme, and many were repainted bright red in the late 1960s before receiving the MTA corporate silver and blue scheme in 1970. Cars 8293, 8392, and 8521 were delivered with a rough surface paint.

The R30s were rebuilt beginning in late 1985 under the General Overhaul (GOH) program as a result of deferred maintenance in the transit system during the 1970s and 1980s. 162 cars, which were GE-powered, were rebuilt in-house at the Coney Island Overhaul Shop in Coney Island, Brooklyn. The 162 cars were painted in a fox red color with black trim and silver roofs, similar to the R33S and R36s used on the 7 line, and were colloquially known as the Redbirds of the B Division. The rebuilt cars were assigned to the J line in an effort to keep only graffiti-free cars on that line. By August 1986, 92 overhauled cars had already been accepted into service; by this time, eight of the overhauled cars had Fuji door operators installed. The non-rebuilt R30s, which were Westinghouse cars numbered 8412–8569, were also painted fox red in the mid-1980s.

=== Retirement ===
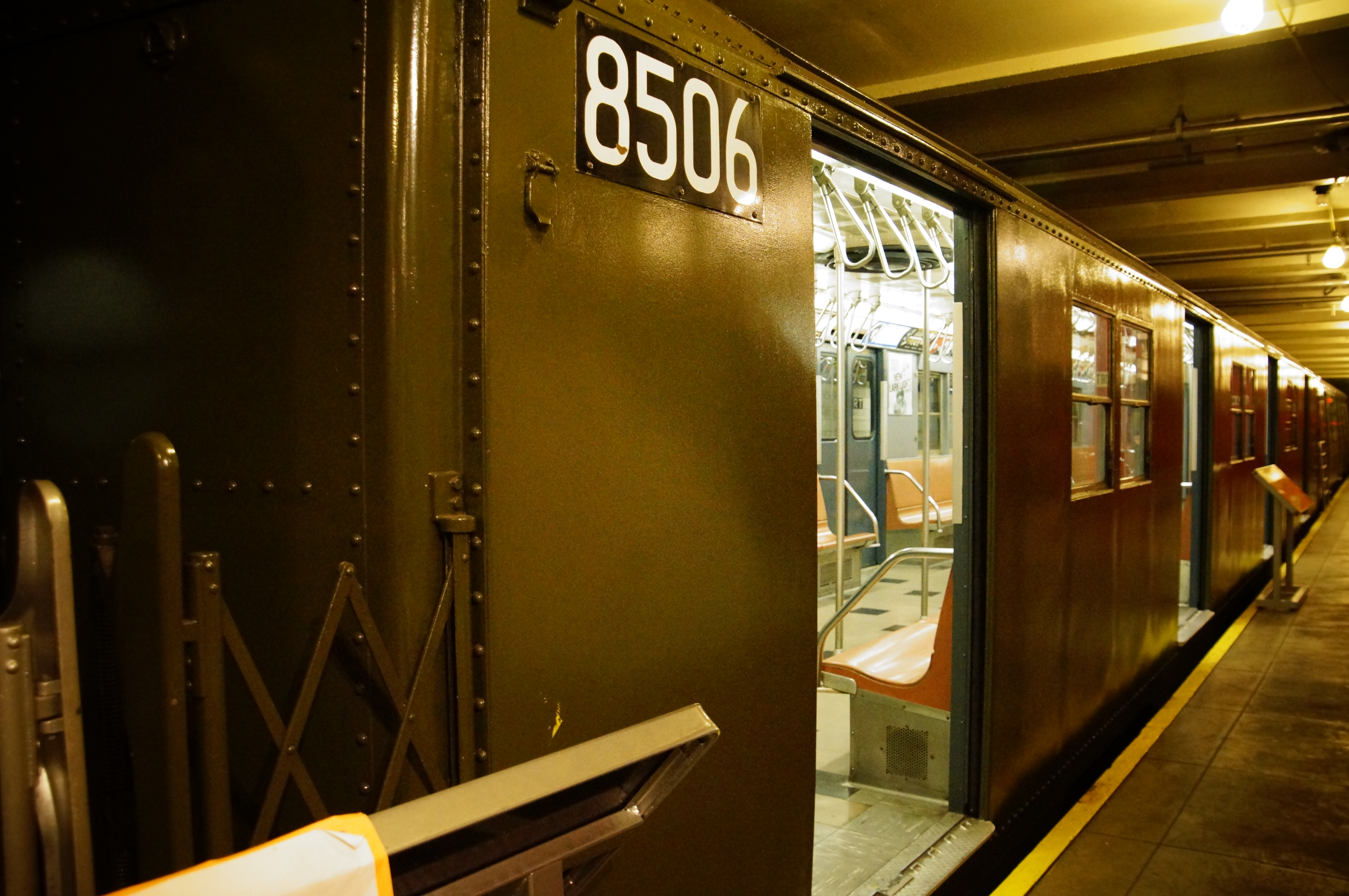
R30 car 8506 on display at the New York Transit Museum

The WH-powered R30s, which were not rebuilt, were replaced by the R68As and the rebuilt R30s, which were transferred from the BMT Eastern Division. The last non-rebuilt train ran on December 14, 1990.

In January 1990, all rebuilt R30s were removed from passenger service due to a failure in a converter bracket that resulted in a train of R30s derailing near the Bedford Park Boulevard station. The rebuilt cars were slowly placed back into service following the incident, but two years later, the MTA made the decision to retire the 162 overhauled cars. A risk assessment analysis was performed in 1991 to either put the cars in long-term storage or to retire them. The fleet suffered from poor reliability and lack of air conditioning; budget concerns and a decline in subway ridership further solidified the decision to prematurely retire the fleet. Installing air conditioning would have been a difficult procedure and would have added extra weight to the cars. In addition, when the fleet was pulled from service in 1990, passenger service managed to continue uninterrupted without any cuts to service despite their absence. On May 30, 1993, the Electric Railroaders' Association sponsored a Farewell to the R30 fan trip. The last of the overhauled R30s were retired from passenger service on June 25, 1993, on the C line after the last of the R46s returned from Morrison–Knudsen undergoing overhaul. Despite the retirement of the fleet, the spare factor in the B Division was only lowered by 12%, which did not cause an adverse effect on service.

After retirement, most cars were sent to what is now Sims Metal Management's Newark facility to be scrapped and processed. Some cars were retained as movie props, but many were ultimately scrapped as well. The new parts used for the rebuilding of the cars (including cam control groups and braking systems) were salvaged and re-installed on GE-powered R36 cars 9558–9769 between 1992–1993 to improve their reliability.

Some R30 cars were saved for various purposes throughout the New York City Subway system. The full list includes:

- 8429 and 8558 – converted to rail adhesion cars, based at Coney Island Yard and Pitkin Yard, respectively.
- 8506 – preserved at the New York Transit Museum in Brooklyn, New York since 1975 after an accident wrecked its mate. This car is painted in the R30s' original dark olive paint scheme.
- 8481 and 8522 – Currently stored at 207th Street Yard in Upper Manhattan.

Other R30s that had been retained or preserved before February 2019 included:

- 8265 and 8336 – used as school cars in Concourse Yard until 2009. They were replaced by R40A cars 4442–4443 (since scrapped) and reefed on April 17, 2010.
- 8289–8290 – used as police training cars in Coney Island Yard until January 2008, when they were reefed.
- 8337 – used as a training car at the Transit Tech High School until 2009, when it was replaced by R42 cars 4736–4737 and reefed later that year.
- 8392 and 8401 – used as fire training cars in Coney Island Yard until July 2004. They were replaced by R110B cars 3004 and 3006 and reefed in July 2007.
- 8394 – placed in an Asics store in Times Square in late October 2014. The car was previously used for filming scenes in the Mojave Desert. Part of the car was cut away to allow the car to fit in the building. The store was closed in mid-October 2015, but a temporary pop-up store opened at the site in late fall 2017. Afterwards, the car sat in the unused space until it was finally cut up in late January 2019.
- 8424–8425 – used as school cars in Coney Island Yard until October 21, 2013, when they were trucked to New Jersey to be scrapped at Sims Metal Management.
- 8463 – used as a school car in Pitkin Yard until October 22, 2013, when it was also trucked to New Jersey to be scrapped at Sims Metal Management (along with R27 car 8145).

== In popular culture ==
- The following movie appearances depict the R30 cars in the Redbird paint scheme.
  - A train of R30s was featured in the film Ghost running as a J train.
  - In the 1993 film Carlito's Way with Al Pacino, R30s were used during the chase scene near the end of the film. Cars 8275, 8277, 8330, 8332, 8335, 8340, and 8351 were seen among others. These trains displayed the 1 Broadway Local rollsigns.
  - For the 1995 film Money Train, two 3-car sets of GE R30s were retrofitted with extra bright lights at the bottom of the car. They were 8294, 8298, 8394–8395, 8397, and 8408. A single four-car set also appeared in the movie. This four-car set included cars 8463, 8510, 8558, and 8569, which were filmed running on New York City Transit property.
  - In the 1995 film Die Hard with a Vengeance, a set of GE R30s, which were the same cars use for Money Train (8294, 8298, 8394–8395, 8397, and 8408) was used for the scene when the rear car of a Brooklyn-bound 3 train is derailed at Wall Street station.
  - In the 1998 movie Godzilla, a partially destroyed R30 car, (8401), was used in an underground scene.
  - A simulated version of the R30 interior was featured in the opening credits of Season 2 of the television show Everybody Hates Chris.
  - Various R30s were shown in the 1982 made-for-TV film Dreams Don't Die, depicting the R30s in the MTA Silver/Blue livery and the beige and orange interiors filmed near Fresh Pond Road station.
  - A scene in the 1977 movie Saturday Night Fever shows a train of R30As running on the RR train.

== See also ==
- R27 (New York City Subway car) – a base train model also built by the St. Louis Car Company.
