= R27 (New York City Subway car) =

Retired class of New York City Subway car

- An R27 train on the former QJ service leaving Sheepshead Bay
- In service: November 15, 1960 – 1990 (30 years)
- Manufacturer: St. Louis Car Company
- Replaced: Some BMT Standards; Many BMT D Triplex Units; BMT New York City ME-1 units; BMT Multi-section units; Many older BMT elevated equipment
- Constructed: 1960–1961
- Entered service: November 15, 1960
- Refurbished: early 1989 (27 cars)
- Scrapped: 1989–1990, 2013
- Number built: 230
- Number preserved: 0
- Number scrapped: 230
- Successor: R68A
- Formation: Married Pairs (2 car sets)
- Fleet numbers: 8020–8249
- Capacity: 56 (seated)
- Operator: New York City Subway

Specifications
- Car body construction: LAHT Carbon steel
- Car length: 60 ft (18.29 m)
- Width: 10 ft (3.05 m)
- Height: 12.08 ft (3.68 m)
- Platform height: 3.76 ft (1.15 m)
- Doors: 8 sets of 45 inch wide side doors per car
- Maximum speed: 55 mph (89 km/h)
- Weight: 80,600 lb (36,560 kg)
- Traction system: Westinghouse XCA248 and General Electric MCM 17KG192A
- Power output: 100 hp (75 kW) per traction motor
- Electric systems: 600 V DC third rail
- Current collection: Top running contact shoe
- Braking system: WABCO ME42B SMEE
- Coupling system: Westinghouse H2C
- Track gauge: 4 ft 8 1/2 in (1,435 mm) standard gauge

The R27 was a New York City Subway car model built by the St. Louis Car Company from 1960 to 1961 for the IND/BMT B Division. A total of 230 cars were built, arranged in married pairs. Two versions were manufactured: Westinghouse (WH)-powered cars and General Electric (GE)-powered cars.

The first R27s entered service on November 15, 1960. In early 1989, twenty-seven R27s were rebuilt and painted in the fox red paint scheme that also appeared on the R30s, with the intention to operate these cars for several more years. The unrebuilt R27s were replaced by the R68As, with the last unrebuilt train running on May 12, 1989. Almost all overhauled R27s were retired the same year due to reliability problems and the lack of air conditioning on the cars. The R27 cars were retired in the early 1990s; none of the R27 fleet were preserved, since they were identical to the later R30/R30A fleet.

== Description ==
The R27s were numbered 8020–8249.

The R27s were a continuation of the R16 style, except that the cars used the IRT R26-style pink hard fiberglass all-longitudinal seating instead of the mixed combination seating found on the older R16s, as well as removing the "porthole" style front windows found on the R15, R16, and R17.

The R27s were coupled together as pairs. These cars, along with their identical R30 and R30A sister cars, replaced the oldest BMT Standards (including all 50 of the trailer cars), the ME-1s purchased and transferred from the SIRT, the MS Multi-section cars, and the IRT Lo-Vs that were modified to be used on B-division shuttles. The R27s were the first cars not to use the numerical route designations used on former BMT lines; the cars ushered in letter designations for such routes (continuing where the IND designations ended). The IND routes, either then or previously in use, ran from A to HH; the BMT designations now ran from J to TT. After the merger in late 1967, many IND and BMT routes were joined together by some lines.

There were two versions of the R27: Westinghouse (WH)-powered equipped cars (8020–8135) and General Electric (GE)-powered cars (8136–8249).

== History ==
The R27s were delivered onto transit property on November 2, 1960. The first train of the fleet, cars 8020–8025 and 8028–8029, entered service on November 15. Two cars were sent back to the manufacturer after sustaining damage while being transported to transit property. By August 1961, all cars in the fleet were in service.

Many R27s were transferred to the BMT Eastern Division after November 1967, although they would appear in the northern and southern divisions as well as on many IND routes as well.

=== Refurbishment and retirement ===
In early 1989, three Westinghouse-powered R27s and 24 General Electric-powered R27s were repainted in the fox red paint scheme with black trim around the end signs and silver roofs, similar to the 162 General Electric-powered R30s and other IRT Redbird subway cars in the subway system. The three Westinghouse-powered cars repainted were cars 8042, 8091, and 8126; the 24 General Electric powered cars repainted were cars 8137, 8143, 8144, 8145, 8148, 8157, 8158, 8159, 8166, 8171, 8172, 8173, 8186, 8187, 8194, 8210, 8211, 8222, 8224, 8225, 8236, 8241, and 8248. These cars were assigned to the C line, but were all pulled from service and retired in May 1989 due to poor reliability. Only one R27, car number 8027, continued service after June 1989 when the rest of the fleet was retired. It was paired with a Westinghouse-powered R30.

The R27s were replaced by the R68A fleet. The last non-repainted set of R27s ran on May 12, 1989, which marked an end to graffiti on subway cars since 1969; the R27 car that was paired with the un-rebuilt R30 car was retired in 1990.

When removed from service between 1989 and 1990, the fleet was sent to what is now Sims Metal Management's Newark, New Jersey facility to be scrapped and processed. Some cars were retained as movie props, but were ultimately scrapped as well. The last R27 in existence was car 8145, which was retained as a school car. It was initially stored at 38th Street Yard before being moved to Pitkin Yard, where it stayed until 2011. Initially held for the New York Transit Museum, it was moved to Coney Island Yard at an unknown date, but was ultimately scrapped due to structural issues. Efforts to permanently preserve the car failed; in the summer of 2013, the car was moved to the 207th Street Yard and finally left transit property on October 22, 2013, for scrap at Sims Metal Management in Newark.

== See also ==
- R30/R30A – a very similar model also built by the St. Louis Car Company.
