= AB Standard (New York City Subway car) =

Retired class of New York City Subway car

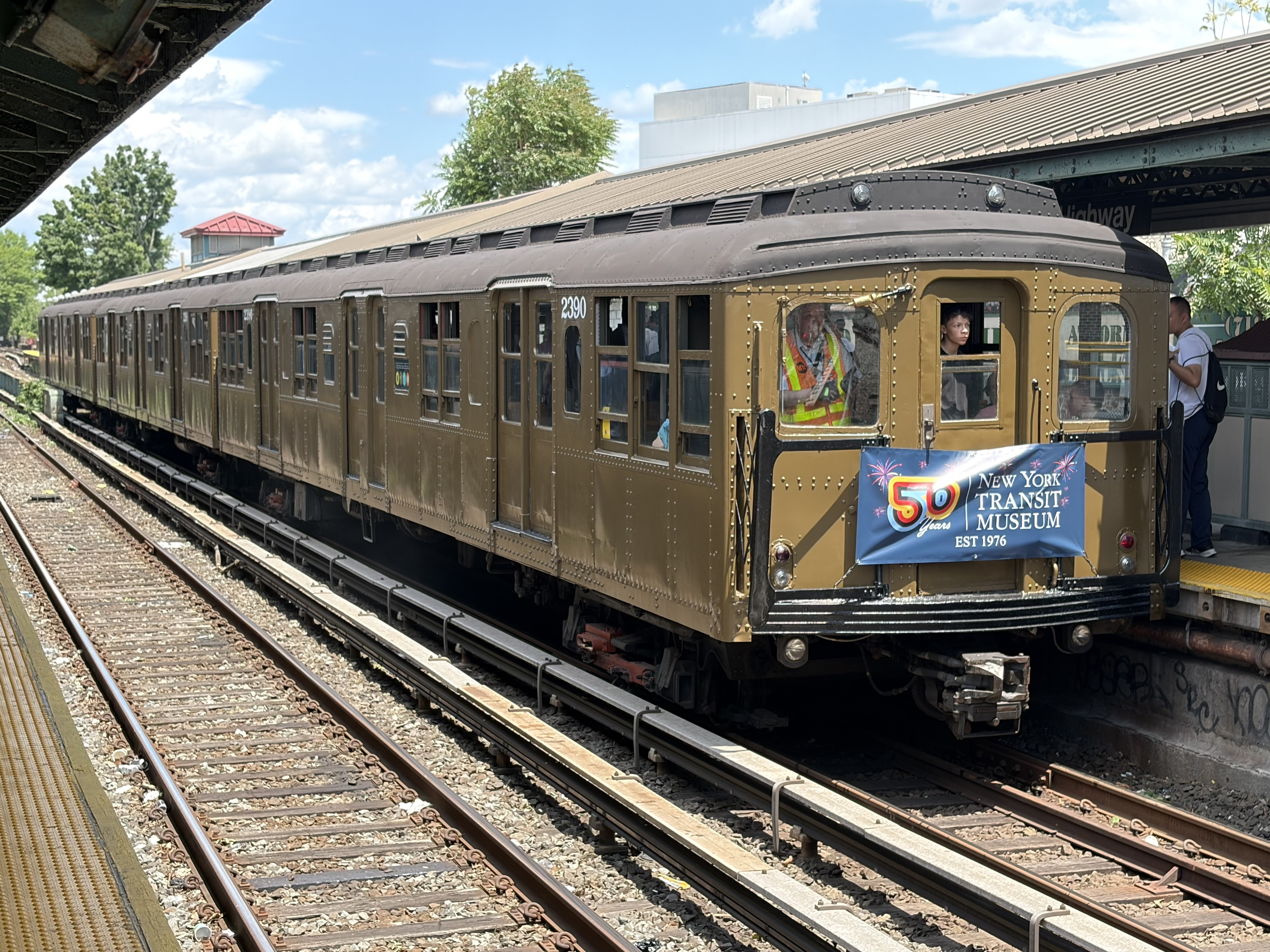
- AB Standards at the Kings Highway station on June 7, 2026

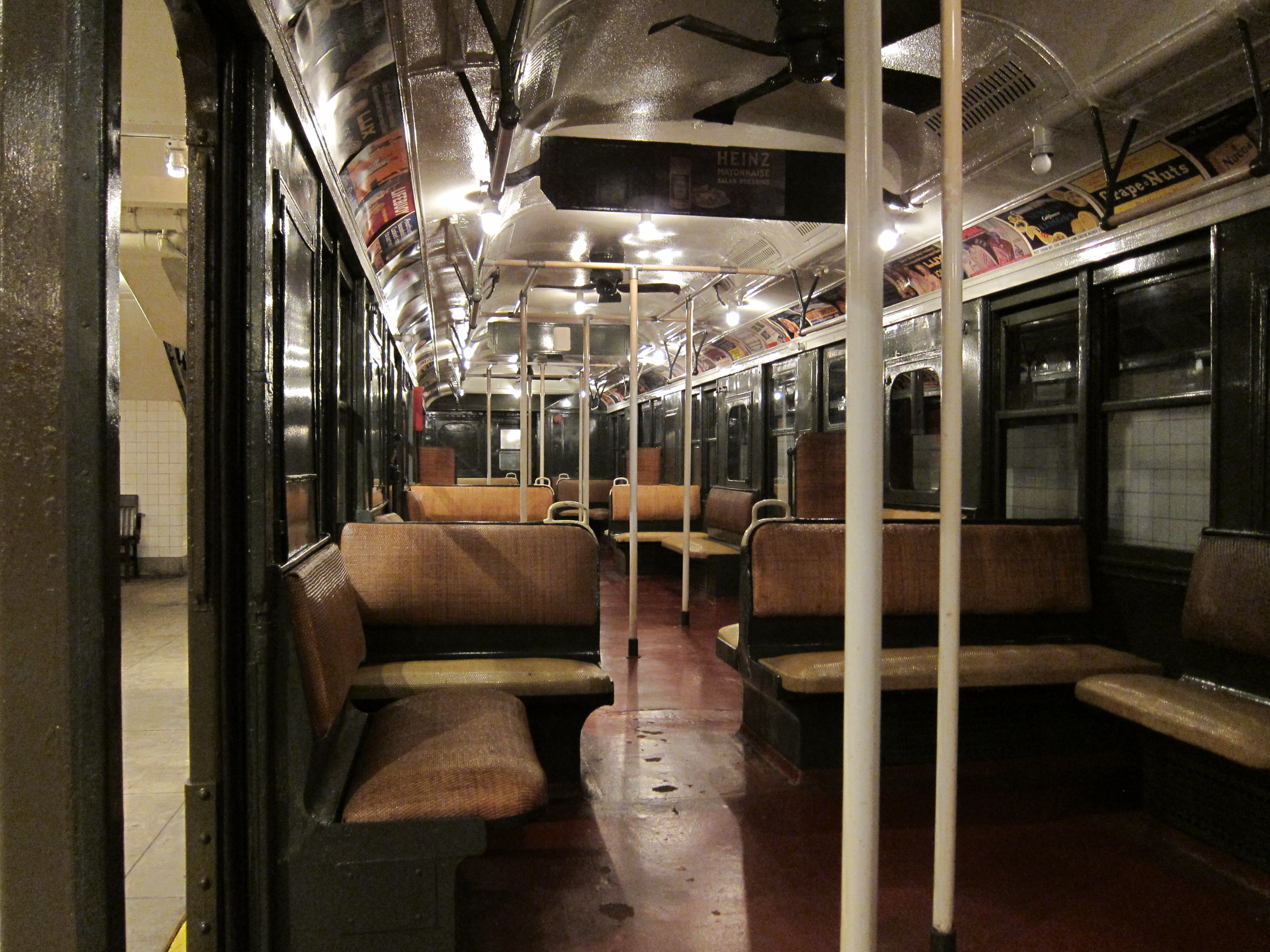
- Interior view of AB Standard car #2204
- In service: 1915–1969
- Manufacturers: American Car and Foundry Company; Pressed Steel Car Company
- Constructed: 1914–1922, 1924
- Entered service: June 22, 1915
- Refurbished: 1958–1960
- Scrapped: 1960–1969
- Number built: 950 (2 additional cars delivered with the 1919 group to replace cars damaged the previous year)
- Number preserved: 5
- Number scrapped: 945
- Successor: R27; R30; R32; R40; R42
- Formation: See letter designations below
- Fleet numbers: 2000–2599 (ACF motors); 2600–2899 (Pressed Steel motors); 4000–4049 (Pressed Steel trailers)
- Capacity: 260: 78 (seated) 182 (standing)
- Operators: Brooklyn Rapid Transit Company; Brooklyn–Manhattan Transit Corporation; NYC Board of Transportation; New York City Transit Authority

Specifications
- Car body construction: Riveted Steel
- Car length: 67 ft 6 in (20.57 m)
- Width: 10 ft 0 in (3,048 mm)
- Height: 12 ft 1 1/8 in (3,686 mm)
- Floor height: 3 ft 1 1/8 in (0.94 m)
- Doors: 6
- Maximum speed: 45 mi (72 km) per hour
- Weight: Motor car: 96,320 lb (43,690 kg); Trailer car: 80,162 lb (36,361 kg)
- Traction system: Motor car: Westinghouse ABF 214 or 480, with Westinghouse 27B master controller, using GE 248A motors (140 hp each). 2 motors per car (1 per truck). Trailer car: None
- Power output: 140 hp (104 kW) per traction motor
- Auxiliaries: Edison B4H (32 Volt) battery with 24 cells. Battery charged primarily by air compressor and trickle charged by car's main lights.
- Electric systems: 600 V DC third rail
- Current collection: Top running contact shoe
- Bogies: A-55 Maximum Traction Truck
- Braking systems: WABCO Schedule AMUE with UE-5 universal valve, ME-23 brake stand, and simplex clasp brake rigging. Air provided by WABCO D-3-F Compressor.
- Coupling system: WABCO H2C
- Track gauge: 4 ft 8 1/2 in (1,435 mm) standard gauge

The AB Standard was a New York City Subway car class built by the American Car and Foundry Company and Pressed Steel Car Company between 1914 and 1924. It ran under the operation of the Brooklyn Rapid Transit Company (BRT) and its successors, which included the Brooklyn–Manhattan Transit Corporation (BMT), the New York City Board of Transportation, and the New York City Transit Authority (NYCTA). The cars were designed following the signing of the Dual Contracts, which called for a major expansion of the BRT. A total of 950 cars were built.

In their earliest days of service, operating crews frequently called them Steels to distinguish them from the wooden BU elevated cars. However, these cars were most commonly referred to as BRT Standards, BMT Standards, or simply Standards. For their time, the cars introduced a significant number of improvements to urban rapid transit. The AB Standards were slowly retired in the 1960s, last running in 1969. Several AB Standards have been preserved.

== Background ==
When the BRT was to begin operating new subway lines that had been planned under the Dual Contracts of 1913, it marked the BRT's entry into providing subway service in New York. Previously, the BRT had only provided passenger rail service on elevated or surface routes. Expansion into the subway meant the BRT had to design a subway car suitable to run underground in tunnels. This also meant the new cars would have to be very different from the BRT's elevated fleet, and significantly stronger. The BRT was a forward-thinking company and sought to design a car that improved upon those already in use on the IRT subway.

To do this, the BRT hired engineer Lewis B. Stillwell to design the cars, based on his work in the railway industry. It was known ahead of the actual signing of the Dual Contracts that the BRT was to operate subway routes, so the engineering effort actually began prior to 1913. Stillwell completed his initial designs for the new 67-foot Standard cars by 1912. In September 1913, a wooden mockup of Stillwell's Standard design was placed on display in Brooklyn for the public and received generally positive reviews. This was enough to go ahead with an order of the new cars.

== Service history ==
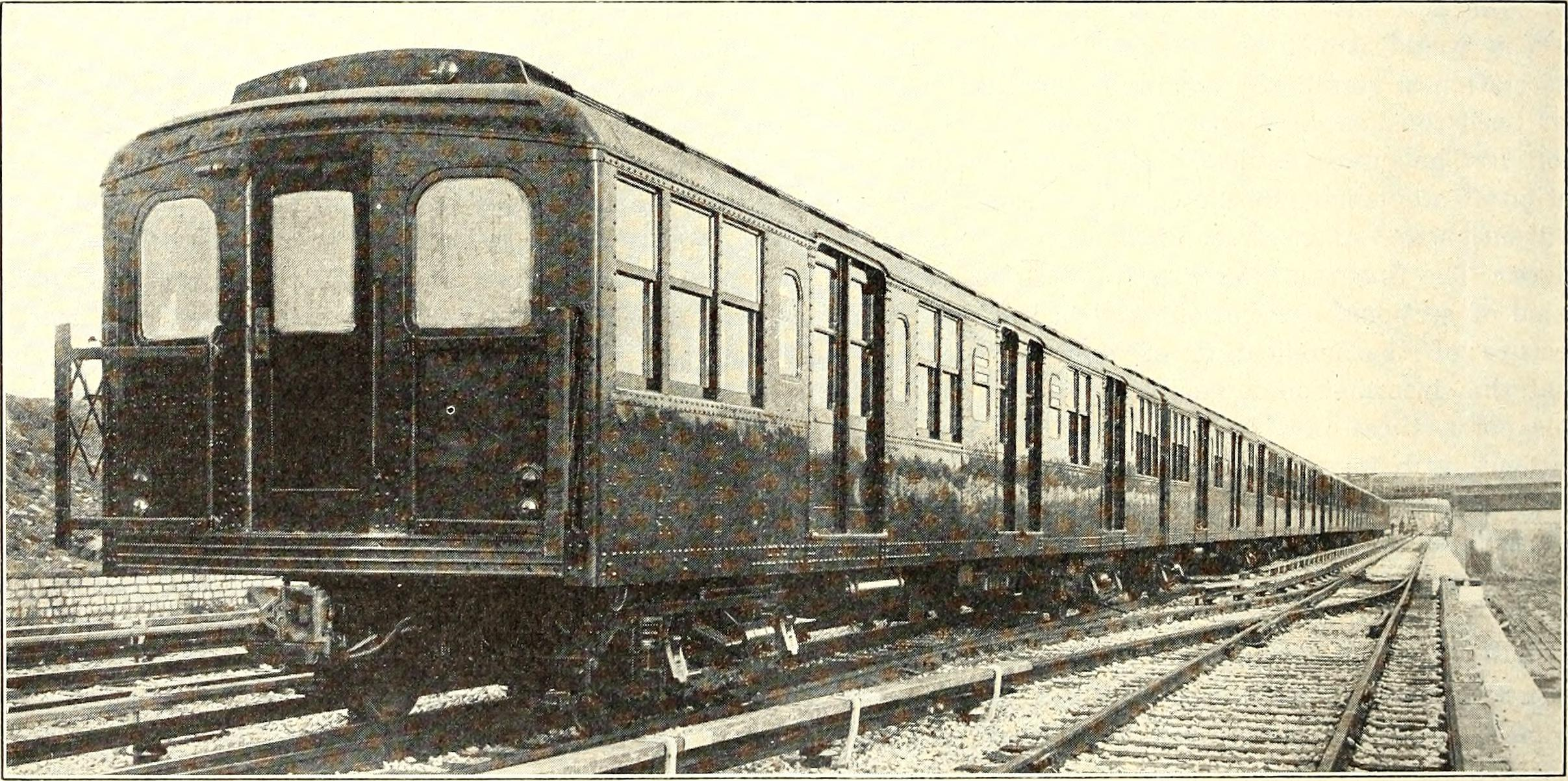
AB Standard cars at a yard in 1915

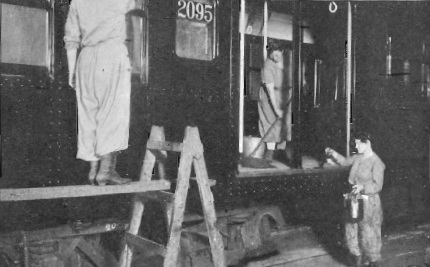
Female shop workers clean and repaint an AB Standard, c. 1917–1918. Women often took jobs in car shops during this time as many men were fighting in World War I.

952 A/B Standards were purchased between 1914 and 1924, 2 of them being replacements for 2 others that were damaged in a collision. 100 motorized cars were ordered every year from 1914 to 1922, and 50 unpowered trailer cars were ordered in 1924. 2 additional cars were delivered as part of the 1919 order to replace 2 cars (2208 and 2274) that had been damaged the previous year. As delivered, all 902 motor cars were "singles", meaning that each could be run entirely by itself if so desired. Trains would be made up of singles coupled together. However, many cars as delivered in later years were immediately coupled into units as indicated below.

The first run of the cars was not until early 1915 when several units specially equipped with trolley poles test operated on the Sea Beach Line prior to its formal opening as a subway line, which took place on June 22, 1915. The poles were also used to move the cars around the 39th Street Shops where they had been originally delivered in 1914. Cars so equipped were 2000, 2001, 2010, 2021, 2042, 2050, 2051, 2054, 2060, 2071, 2087, and 2092. After June 22, 1915, the A/B Standards operated regular subway service. Trolley poles were removed from those cars which had been specially equipped.

During their service lives, the A/B Standards saw service on all four routes serving Coney Island: the West End Line, Culver Line, Sea Beach Line, and Brighton Line. They also ran in the Fourth Avenue Subway, the Broadway Subway, and on the Astoria Line, as well as parts of the BMT's Eastern Division, which includes the Broadway–Brooklyn/Jamaica Line, Broadway–Myrtle Avenue Line, Nassau Street Subway, and the 14th Street–Canarsie Line. Beginning December 1, 1955, well into their service lives, the cars also saw service on the IND Queens Boulevard Line once the 60th Street Tunnel Connection was completed and BMT Brighton Local service was extended to Forest Hills–71st Avenue in Queens (some units had operated on this line to 179th St. during the 1957 motormen's strike). In 1958, a brief test was conducted using a train of these cars in IND F service between Jamaica–179th Street and Broadway–Lafayette Street.

Several significant modifications were made during the cars' period of service. In approximately 1919 and 1920, the passenger compartment of the oldest cars was upgraded to add fans, additional lighting, and more places for standees to hold on. Also at that time, the cars were modified to operate in new arrangements (see letter designations below). In addition, the cars were also modified to allow an entire train's doors to be opened or closed from one point on the train. Prior to this modification, it had been necessary to station a conductor in every car of a train to operate doors prior to the advent of MUDC. Following the modification, one conductor could operate the doors for an entire train. This allowed the BRT (BMT after 1923) to reduce operating costs. The modification involved connecting 9-point jumpers between cars to pass along electric door control signals from the conductor's position. Exterior guard lights had to be added to all cars on all divisions equipped with MUDC (Multiple Unit Door Control). On these cars, these were placed on the same fuse that operated the Empty and Load feature (described below). This was done to save on battery current.

In 1927, platforms along the Southern Division stations were being extended to allow for the operation of full length, 8-car trains. Such trains still required the use of two conductors; it was not until September 1958 that they began operating using only one conductor.

Further modifications were made in the late 1950s. As the A/B Standards were nearing the end of their useful service life, the New York City Transit Authority set up a plan to retire the cars by the end of the 1960s. Trailers were to be retired first, in the early part of the 1960s. This was a matter of practicality since all trailer cars in the New York City Subway were being phased out. Motor cars would be retired next, starting with the oldest cars (cars 2000–2299, along with a few 2300s). The rest of the fleet would need to serve longer until new car orders could replace them, so cars 2400–2799 were to receive a light overhaul to allow them to serve through the 1960s. Car 2899 was also overhauled, as it was part of a three-car set with two cars (2700s) that fell within the scope of the program. Cars 2800–2898 were not overhauled as they had a non-standard group box switch. The remaining 2300s and the 2800s were retired during the mid-1960s; and the overhauled cars continued in service until the last train operated on August 4, 1969, in Myrtle–Chambers service. Overhauled cars received sealed beam headlights to illuminate tunnels. In addition, their interiors were revitalized with enhanced lighting and seat cushions. Overhauled cars also received a more modern General Electric propulsion control package during this time, which was believed by the Transit Authority to be an upgrade over the older Westinghouse packages. About half the overhauled cars were so equipped.

=== Retirement ===
The BMT AB Standards were slowly retired through the 1960s and replaced by R27s, R30s, R32s, R40s, and R42s. Retirement began with the trailer cars, progressed to older motor cars that were not overhauled, and finally progressed to the rest of the fleet. The last of the cars were retired from passenger service in 1969, making a final run on the BMT Myrtle Ave. Line on August 4, 1969.

Following their removal from service, all but five AB Standards were scrapped. The five cars that were not scrapped have been preserved:

- Car 2204 has been preserved by the New York Transit Museum in Brooklyn, NY. It is currently a static display, as it is not operational.
- Cars 2390, 2391 and 2392 have been preserved by Railway Preservation Corp. They were restored to operating condition in 2015 and have operated on New York Transit Museum-sponsored excursions since then.
- Car 2775 has been preserved by the Shore Line Trolley Museum in East Haven, Connecticut. It is not in operating condition, due to a flood at the museum site.

It has also been reported that car 2321, when retired, survived integrally and intact. The current status of this car remains unclear.

== Description ==
=== Construction and design ===
The A/B Standards, when ordered, were a noticeable upgrade in the quality of New York's urban transportation. Their longer (67 feet) and wider size (10 feet) distinguished them from smaller IRT subway cars. There would be more room in each car and more space for seats. Unlike the IRT cars, end side doors were offset from the ends of the cars to aid better passenger flow. This design is covered under U.S. patent 1,142,263, with Mr. William S. Menden (chief engineer, and later general manager of the BRT) as the inventor. In addition, there was also a set of center side doors, making for a total of three sets of doors per side. Each door set consisted of two leaves separated by a center post, which allowed more than one person to use it at once. This arrangement proved superior to all previous designs.

The cars were built with a very strong frame that utilized truss construction and allowed thin metal to be used for the side plating. This made the A/B Standards, foot for foot, lighter than similar all-steel IRT subway cars, but with a body twice as strong. Therefore, A/B Standards were considerably safer than any previous design, as they would not telescope in a collision. The strength of the design proved itself over and over again. Even in the 1960s, when the A/B Standards were at or approaching 50 years of age, a couple of cars were involved in minor yard collisions with newer cars. Yet in each case, the older cars appeared to have gotten the better of the collision afterward.

Motorized A/B Standards (motor cars 2000–2899) were built with 2 "maximum traction" type trucks where wheels closest to the center of the car were 34^{1}/_{4} inches in diameter, while wheels closest to the ends of the car were just 31 inches in diameter. The motors were attached to the axles that bore the larger wheels. This design was believed to better distribute the car's weight to provide the best adhesion between the wheels and the rails to prevent wheelslip. Unpowered BX trailer cars 4000–4049 used more conventional trucks where all wheels were 31 inches in diameter.

=== Innovations for riders ===
Seating was designed to be comfortable and spacious. The A/B Standards had short rattan benches arranged in both transverse (forward- or rear-facing) and longitudinal (sideways-facing) positions. Two to three people could fit comfortably on each bench. This gave each rider more legroom and personal space. Supplemental seats located by each side door could be folded down for rider use at a conductor's discretion. When lowered, these seats would block side door leaves, so they were protected by lock to ensure only a conductor could lower them. Many of these latter were removed in later years. On the outer side doors, these were situated toward the center of the cars on cars 2000–2299 and toward the end of the cars on cars 2300–2899 and 4000–4049. Under regular conditions, 78 seats were available for riders in each car. During the 1950s, many (but not all) of the rattan seats were replaced by sprung leather or a plastic compound (velon) that replicated the feel of rattan.

For standees, the cars featured four poles by each side door and small handles on the ends of transverse seats (in later years, two of those poles per doorway were removed on many cars). Due to higher than anticipated ridership, metal straps were added above longitudinal seats to improve standee accommodations in 1919–1920. All orders of these cars delivered later (cars 2600–2899, 4000–4049) came with metal straps already in place. During the late 1930s, many (but not all) of the cars saw the metal straps replaced with horizontal steel bars. These accommodated even more riders than the straps had, further improving the cars. With the earlier ACF built cars, all but around 93 of these cars underwent this conversion; of the later Pressed Steel cars, just under half were converted.

As delivered, the A/B Standards were particularly luxurious for a subway car. Each window came with a shade that could be drawn down to block out sunlight, or raised if a rider desired more natural light. Soft white glass globes served as enclosures for the car's incandescent lighting, to soften the harsh glare of the bulbs and redistribute light evenly throughout the car. However, the globes were ultimately removed from the cars between 1925 and 1927 and the shades between 1927 and 1938. In car 2221, the shade boards were altogether removed as well.

During the winter months, electric heaters under the seats provided plenty of heat. P. Smith heaters were used on cars 2400–2599 and a Gold Car Heating model for the rest of the fleet. In warmer weather, vents in the roof accommodated the influx of fresh air from outside the car. Three different vent types were used on these grill type (2000–2499), box type (2500–2599), and clerestory type (2600–2899, 4000–4049). With the earlier ACF cars, the interior ventilation grills were readjusted with each order of cars to attempt to get the ideal angle for the best ventilation. In addition, riders could open the drop sash side windows for extra ventilation. Initially made from wood (2000–2599), on later cars they were brass (2600–2899, 4000–4049). After early complaints about the summer warmth of the cars, ceiling paddle fans were added during the 1919–1920 modifications. Later cars came already equipped with fans.

=== Innovations for the crew ===
The A/B Standards introduced interior conductor's controls. Now a conductor could stand inside rather than outside and between cars when operating the doors. The button board controls only worked if the conductor activated the board by key. This prevented tampering or error. The button boards were equipped with an indication flag which told the conductor when all doors were finally closed. As mentioned above, each car as delivered required its own conductor to operate doors. During the 1919–20 modifications, the cars were unitized into new arrangements (see letter designations below) and converted to allow one conductor to control an entire train's doors. This made operation of the cars more efficient, and reduced labor costs.

Like all previously designed subway cars, A/B Standards featured end storm doors for riders to pass between cars. However, due to the car's longer 67-foot length and resultant overhang, crossing between cars was particularly dangerous on curves. Therefore, storm doors were kept locked on these cars, although in emergencies, they could be opened pneumatically by the conductor from the button board. For emergencies, the cars also featured emergency brake cords like other subway cars, but added an emergency alarm which could be activated to notify the train crew in case of emergency.

Electric tail lights and running lights were introduced to the subway with the A/B Standards. Low running lights would display white at the front of the train, while tail lights displayed red in the rear. This feature was directly connected to the motorman's reverser control. This was in contrast to the IRT practice of using kerosene lamps at the ends of trains, which had to be physically changed over when the train reversed direction at a terminal. At the time the A/B Standards were delivered, the white running lights were deemed sufficient for lighting tunnels. However, during the 1950s, the New York City Subway made a system wide shift to sealed beam headlights to improve safety. Therefore, those that received overhaul from 1959 to 1962 (cars 2400–2799 and 2899) received sealed beams.

Coupling and uncoupling of trains were simplified by new automatic couplers. The new WABCO couplers automatically made and broke electric and air connections as trains were coupled or uncoupled. This reduced the amount of work for train crews during the process. For example, IRT crews had to physically connect or disconnect high voltage jumper cables when coupling or uncoupling their trains. BRT/BMT crews on A/B Standards did not. The only jumper such a crew would ever have to connect or disconnect was the 9 point low voltage jumper introduced with the 1919–1920 modifications. Coupling and uncoupling, therefore, were much simpler on these cars than on equipment that came before them

Also introduced was the rollsign to the New York City Subway, an innovation that would be repeated on many other rolling stock orders. Older cars had metal signs which had to be physically removed and replaced to change. Rollsigns simplified the process by allowing train crews to update the sign's display by merely turning a hand crank (which would later be replaced with an allen wrench to prevent tampering in later rolling stock). Early A/B Standards (cars 2000–2499) had the smaller size rollsigns installed in the windows behind side door pockets, while later cars equipped with larger signs placed them in the upper half of side windows for better visibility. These were shifted to a different window in the 50 trailers of 1924.

During the late 20s and early 30s, the BMT installed special features on some of these cars. 2222-3-4 had a bridge/tunnel indication light at each end of that unit. 2553 had arm bars on the side seats alongside the doors opposite from where the drop seats were located. Also, the following units were furnished with gum dispensing machines: 2300-1-2 through 2357-8-9, 2375-6-7, 2400-4000-2401 through 2424-4012-2425. 2018 had elongated arms on its hand stanchions.

Shortly after unification, car 2014 was out of service long term due to some major mechanical problem. When it reappeared in service after a few years, there had been some changes - it received the larger door pocket compartments typical of the later Pressed Steel cars rather than the smaller variety that the ACF cars had. Additionally, it was equipped with longer emergency light fixtures that extended further out.

In the mid-40s, the Board of Transportation experimented with different interior paint schemes as an alternative to the more usual olive drab. All divisions had cars that were tested for different combinations. With the A/B Standards, the following cars were tested:

2333-4-5 dark, green, and gray.

2381-2-3 brown and tan.

2666 dark, red, and gray, with a red stripe running just above the windows.

2698 dark, green, and gray.

2747 dark, blue, and gray.

It was finally decided to paint the BMT cars with a light apple green and olive drab combination, and this was applied as well to the IRT Steinways, both regular and World's Fair, that were now being maintained in the Coney Island Shops.

=== Propulsion and braking ===
Low Voltage propulsion control was coming into style around the time the earliest A/B Standards were being delivered. Therefore, it was no surprise that they arrived with this feature. On earlier high voltage propulsion control systems, 600 volts ran through the motorman's control stand, as well as through the train via the use of jumpers between cars. This had to be the case to make the electrical contacts to allow all of the motor cars of a train to draw power in a synchronized effort from the third rail. However, this could be dangerous for motormen and shop personnel alike by creating an electrocution hazard. Even unpowered trailer cars had to carry the 600 volts through these jumpers because it was necessary to pass on the voltage to motor cars behind the trailer so as to synchronize them with the lead car. However, Low Voltage propulsion control utilized battery voltage (32 volts) to control the train's motors. This battery voltage was what would pass through the motorman's control stand and between cars. Tractive effort throughout the train was synchronized by the battery voltage in this way. Meanwhile, each car would respond individually to the battery voltage, by moving its own 600 volt contacts to direct power obtained locally by each car directly from the third rail toward the motors. Using 32 volts to control the propulsion in this way was a much safer proposition than the 600 volts associated with the older high voltage setup. This also meant that an A/B Standard crossing onto a dead section of the third rail would not energize it by bridging the gap between it and the previous live section. This was especially beneficial to track workers who had requested the third rail power off in performing their duties. All told, Low Voltage propulsion control tremendously improved safety for train crews, shop crews, and track gangs. However, the conductor had a 600 volt knife switch located inside his control panel to activate the ventilation system and other accessories.

One of the drawbacks of the A/B Standard was its lack of speed. Due to its length, it was a much heavier car than the IRT steel cars of the time. But with only two motors per car at 140 horsepower each, it was actually underpowered for its size, particularly when running in a train with one or more unpowered trailers. Therefore, the top speed of this type car was somewhat low, when compared to other rapid transit equipment that has historically run in New York City.

One other interesting note about the car's propulsion concerned the placement of the motorman's controls in the cab. A/B Standards stuck with BRT tradition, which placed the train's controller nearest the right hand and the brake nearest the left. This was in contrast to IRT equipment, which placed the controller nearest the left and the brake nearest the right. The city-owned IND system would emulate the IRT's practice. Meanwhile, later BMT designs would replicate the A/B Standards. Therefore, the controls in subway cars of BRT or BMT design would appear "backwards" to motormen who were acclimated primarily to IRT or IND equipment once the subways had been unified

An electropneumatic braking system which synchronized the braking effort of every car in the train to provide a faster braking response was first introduced on the A/B Standards. This newer type of braking, WABCO schedule AMUE, would become the industry standard in New York's subways and on other systems through the 1930s and lasted in limited quantity until as late as 1977 (when the R1–9s, the last of the prewar cars, were retired from service). Additionally, a "Variable Load" feature, designated on these cars as an "Empty and Load" device, automatically adjusted each car's braking effort to compensate for uneven passenger loads in different cars throughout the train. This activated when the doors opened and shut down while the last door of a car was closed, provided that the motorman's electric brake plug was engaged. At terminals, this was customarily deactivated. It was basically a fledgling system, yet to be perfected, as other cars using this same AMUE Universal braking system that did not have this variable load feature were actually seen to have a more effective braking response, such as with the Low-Vs and Steinways on the IRT.

An interlock system was introduced on these cars between the motorman's control system and the door operation, in which a stationary train could not be moved when the doors were opened; conversely, there was a feature by which the doors could not be opened when the speed of a train was 4 MPH or higher, provided that the train was taking power at the time and not coasting.

With most cars, the door control magnets under the seats each controlled a whole panel, meaning both leaves at each door opening. Cars 2250–2299 were different in that each magnet controlled a separate door leaf.

=== Experimenting with new technology ===
A handful of A/B Standards became the first New York City subway cars to experiment with a public address system. Car 2369 was the first to be so equipped; ultimately, several cars received a loudspeaker telephone system in 1923–24 to aid conductors in making announcements. The experimental setup was removed by 1928, but the idea was ahead of its time. PA systems did not come into widespread use in New York's subway until the 1950s.

The A/B Standards were also the first New York City Subway equipment to experiment with cab signaling. The underlying rationale for the experiment was to allow trains to run safely at closer headways to provide more frequent service. An attempt was made in 1916 on car 2148 to test a GRS cab signal system using A/B Standards. While generally working as intended, the experiment did not have staying power. The equipment necessary for its use was removed by 1918. It was not until the 1990s that a similar idea would be revisited in the subway, when MTA New York City Transit installed modern CBTC signal equipment on the BMT Canarsie Line.

== Letter designations ==
Over their service life, the A/B Standards used several letter designations depending on the configuration of the cars. Originally, the first 600 cars as delivered could operate singly and dubbed A-types. During the 1919–1920 modifications, much of the fleet was reorganized into semi-permanently coupled units as an MUDC system was being added. The following configurations refer to the cars in operation over the years:

- A units were motorized single cars and capable of running independently.
- B units consisted of three motorized cars that ran in a set. The two end cars retained their operating cabs at the front and rear, but blind cabs were made inactive. Door control button boards were similarly deactivated in the end cars, but retained in the center (master) car. The center car's blind cabs were made inactive.
- BT units consisted of two motorized cars that ran in a set. Each car retained its operating cab at the front and rear, but blind cabs were made inactive. On these units, there was no provision made for door operation, and thus, these units could not be operated independently by themselves. (Note: this designation was also used much later on to designate cars formally from BX units that had their trailers removed but did not receive a former A car as a replacement.)
- BX units were three-car units consisting of an unpowered trailer between two motorized cars. The two end cars retained their operating cabs at the front and rear, but blind cabs were made inactive. There was a restriction on the use of these units; one such unit was not permitted to operate by itself, nor could two of these units operate together in one consist. In addition, for many years they were forbidden to operate on the Manhattan Bridge, but this restriction was lifted when the majority of the units were reassigned to Coney Island to provide for the expanded service via the 60th St. Tunnel Connection on December 1, 1955.
- AX units were trailers that operated in connection with an A-type car, loosely associated. Five trailers were originally set up in this manner, but the arrangement was not found to be satisfactory, and they were ultimately coupled into BX units as the rest of the trailers already had been. Though they did not themselves have motors, the cabs could control the entire train's propulsion. They were typically added onto trains to lengthen them during the rush hours, and they were used strictly on the 14th St.–Canarsie Line.

The frequent operating and shop personnel references to the cars as ABs or AB Types were derived from the above letter designations, as the vast majority of the cars were originally A units, and later reorganized into B units.

Additionally, it is noted that other letter designations were used temporarily involving an extra "A" preceding the unit name. This was done as the A/B Standards were being modified in regard to their jumper cable connections. This work went on from approximately 1928 to 1931, and during those years, one could see units carrying designations "AA", "AB", or "ABX". The extra "A" signified that the car had been so equipped. These designations with the extra "A" prefix were temporary, and when the entire fleet of these cars had been so equipped by 1931 or 1932, the extra "A" prefix was dropped from the designations.

Regarding the first 600 cars, while they were being unitized, it was found that 2 cars of this series (2399 and 2500) did not fit into the system as it was being set up. These were relegated to work service and not used again until 1953, when 2 of the regular motor cars (2006 and 2330) were damaged in an accident near Broad St. Thus, these 2 cars were returned to passenger service to replace the 2 that had been damaged. As a consequence, there have never at any time been more than 948 in service and 952 were actually built, but the number 950 serves as a convenient benchmark. 2 A cars (2714 and 2741) were used to replace those that had been in work service and were returned to passenger service.

Regarding the 300 Pressed Steel motors, as they were first being delivered, the decision was made not to unitize the first 150, or half of them, to allow for the operation of more varied train lengths, notably for maximum 8 car length. The final 150 were unitized as B-types in much the manner of the earlier sets.

In 1959, the first 3 2800 series units were tested for few months with the center car as a trailer, much like a BX unit. After the test was concluded, the motors were returned to these units, and they resumed operation as normal B-types.

In later years, as the 2400 series was undergoing rebuilding, it was decided not to include the trailer cars in the rebuilding. The first 70 2400s had a 2600 series A-type car inserted in the unit (a total of 35 of these cars were used for this purpose); these units were designated as B-types. The remaining 30 2400s just remained as two car BT units, with as before, no provision for door operation in these cars.

One first that occurred with these newly constituted units was, except for the first units put out, the remainder were equipped with link bar connections rather than couplers, making for a more permanent coupling that could only be broken up with great difficulty in the shops. All new cars subsequently purchased for the system made use of this feature and couplers were no longer used to join component cars in units.

It should be pointed out that for several years prior to these rebuilt cars appearing in service in March 1959, many of the features introduced were already being tested out on a few cars.

The rebuilt cars had their lighting system rewired for brighter lighting, similar to the IND R1–9s and the IRT World's Fair Steinways, in a single circuit hookup. Car 2710 was tried out simply with additional lighting fixtures along the sides, and car 2006 (ex-2500) with the revised circuitry for brighter lighting. The decision was made to use the revised circuitry and also add a single light fixture in the corner opposite the motorman's cab. This latter was tried out on eight cars prior to rebuilding – 2060, 2184, 2333–4, 2354-5-6, 2618. The wiring used for these cars was defective and resulted in numerous fires, far more than with other types of cars.

At the ends of the cars, the cross seating was removed between the outer set of side doors and the car ends, leaving only the side seats in their place. On the test cars (2119, 2396-7-8, 2482-4041-2483), this was done only at the blind, non-operating ends, but eventually, the cars that were rebuilt received this at all ends.

A speckled green interior paint was applied to these cars. There was a sample car (2654) for the first 8 that went into service (2472 (ex-2771)-4036-2473 (ex-2753), 2588-9-90, 2693, 2743), and for the remainder, which were painted on the interior further up toward the roof line, there was a sample car (2675) for this as well.

Around this time, car 2851 had one set of center doors painted over on its lower panes.

The first 8-car train of sample cars went into Brighton Express service in March 1959. With the shifting of equipment concurrent with service changes two months later, the train was moved to Sea Beach Express service. Soon afterward, the train was broken up and was freely mixed with other A/B Standards, as were cars that were later rebuilt. Rebuilt and unrebuilt cars were freely mixed in consists henceforth.

Headlights were added to the rebuilt cars beginning in 1962, when the rebuilding program was about complete. In anticipation of this installation, two cars were modified to have only one running light fixture: 2060 and 2743. Car 2709 never received headlights altogether; ironically, it was one of the cars scrapped when some of these cars were substituted on the scrap list for those to be preserved for the museum. 15 of the 2800 series cars (5 units) remained in Coney Island Yard for 2 years after their service ended. No move was made to save any of them for the museum.

Beginning in 1956, the exterior painted on numbers were supplanted by number plates. After 1959, all cars being rebuilt received them.

== Summary of differences within the AB Standard fleet ==
The following differences existed within cars comprising the fleet of AB Standards:

Car Numbers	Type	Builder	Overhauled?	Roof Ventilator Type	Heaters	Rollsign Placement	Side Window Sash
#2000–#2399	Motors	American Car & Foundry	No	Grill	Gold Car Heating	Door Pocket Window	Wooden
#2400–#2499	Motors	American Car & Foundry	Yes (1960–1962)	Grill	P. Smith	Door Pocket Window	Wooden
#2500–#2599	Motors	American Car & Foundry	Yes (1959–1960)	Box	P. Smith	Side Window	Wooden
#2600–#2799	Motors	Pressed Steel Car Co.	Yes (1959–1962)	Clerestory	Gold Car Heating	Side Window	Brass
#2800–#2899	Motors	Pressed Steel Car Co.	#2899 only (1959)	Clerestory	Gold Car Heating	Side Window	Brass
#4000–#4049	Trailers	Pressed Steel Car Co.	No	Clerestory	Gold Car Heating	Side Window	Brass

- Of the sixth set of cars (4000 to 4049), only 4036 had been rebuilt, removed from service when it was decided not to use trailers in this program. It survived a few years afterward, used as a yard office, and was finally scrapped at the time remaining unrebuilt cars were being retired.

See the Description above for more details.

== See also ==
- SIRT ME-1, a similar car built in 1925 by the Standard Steel Car Company for Staten Island Rapid Transit.
