= R179 (New York City Subway car) =

Class of New York City Subway car

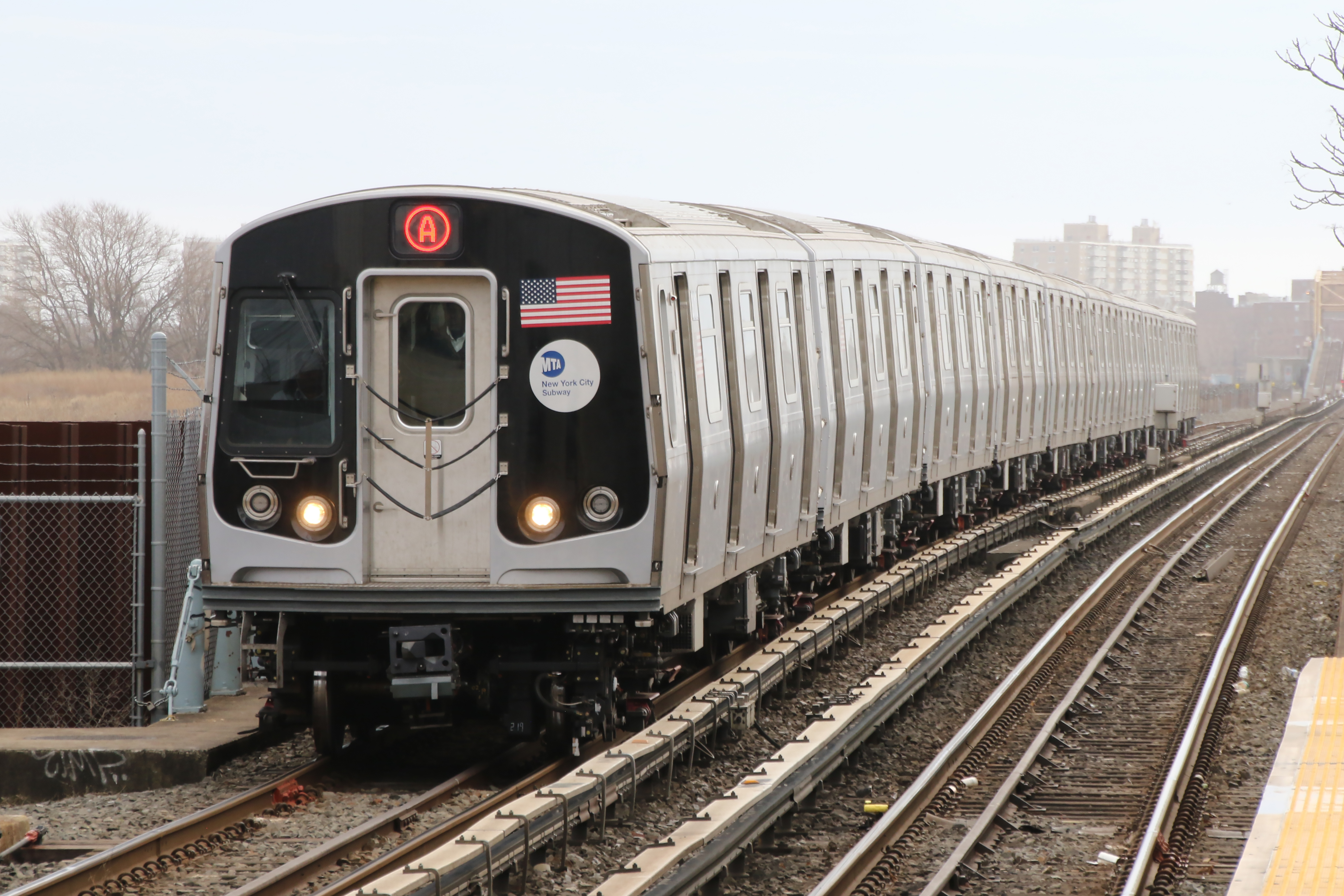
- An A train of R179s approaching Broad Channel

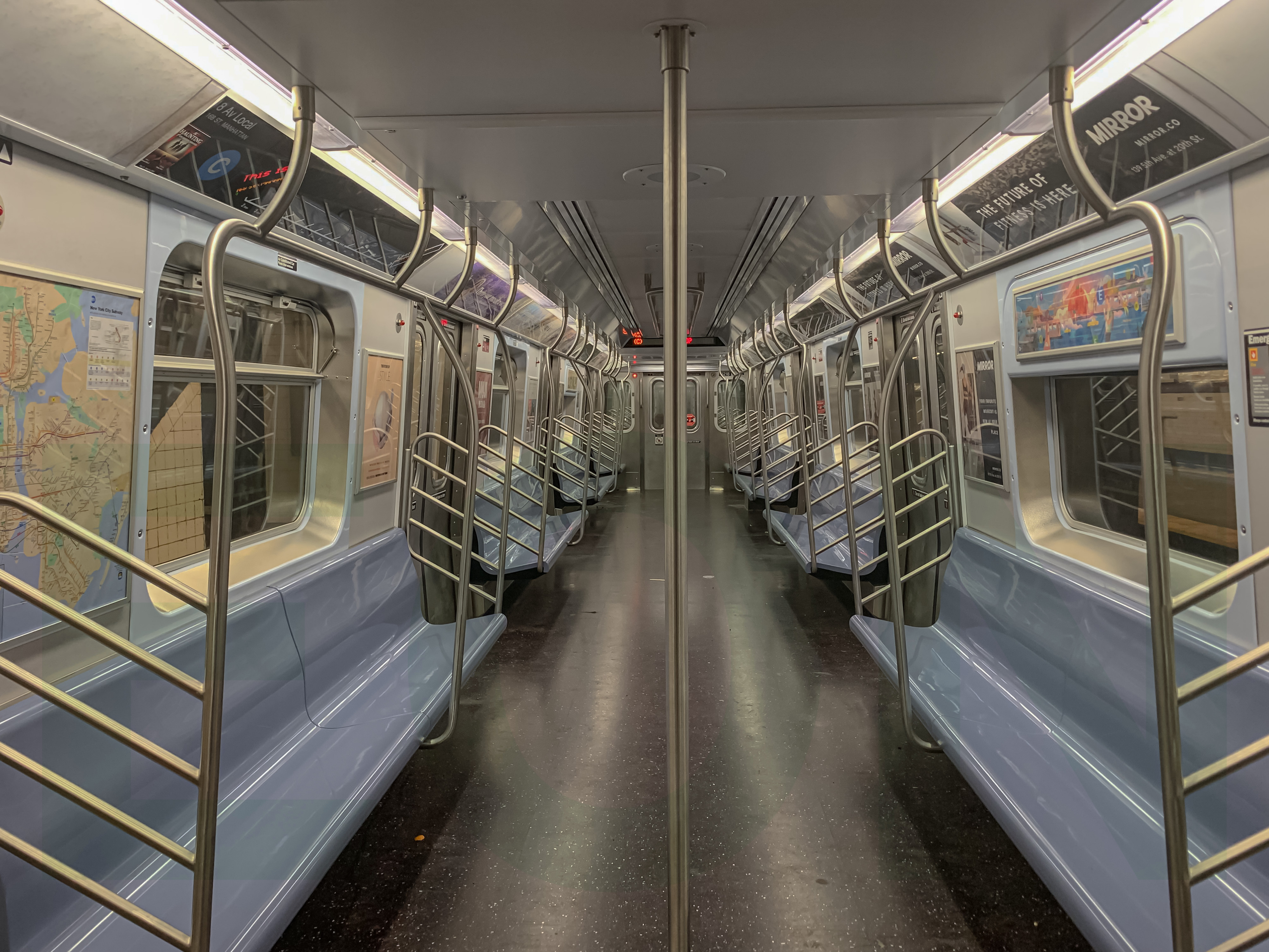
- Interior of an R179 car
- In service: November 19, 2017 – present (9 years)
- Manufacturer: Bombardier Transportation
- Built at: La Pocatière, Quebec, Canada (final assembly: Plattsburgh, New York, US)
- Family name: New Technology Train
- Replaced: All remaining R32s and R42s
- Constructed: 2016–2019
- Entered service: Five-car sets: February 10, 2019; Four-car sets: November 19, 2017
- Number built: 318
- Number in service: 318
- Formation: 47 four-car sets (two B cars); 26 five-car sets (three B cars)
- Fleet numbers: Five-car sets: 3010–3049, 3238–3327; Four-car sets: 3050–3237
- Capacity: 40 seating 200 standing (A car); 44 seating 196 standing (B car)
- Operator: New York City Subway
- Depots: 207th Street Yard (222 cars); East New York Yard (96 cars)
- Services assigned: (Updated June 30, 2024)

Specifications
- Car body construction: Stainless steel with fiberglass ends and rear bonnets
- Train length: 4-car train: 242 feet (74 m); 5-car train: 302.5 feet (92.2 m); 8-car train: 484 feet (148 m); 10-car train: 605 feet (184 m)
- Car length: 60.5 feet (18.4 m)
- Width: 9.88 feet (3,011 mm)
- Height: 11.14 feet (3,395 mm)
- Floor height: 3.734 ft (1.138 m)
- Platform height: 3.734 ft (1.138 m)
- Doors: 8 sets of 50 inch wide side doors per car
- Maximum speed: 66 mph (110 km/h) (design); 55 mph (89 km/h) (service)
- Weight: 80,970 pounds (36,730 kg)
- Traction system: Bombardier MITRAC IGBT–VVVF
- Traction motors: 2 or 4 (Note: 2 motors on A1 cars (lowest number car in unitized set), 4 motors on A2 & B cars) Bombardier TM1301SP 3-phase AC induction motors
- Acceleration: 2.5 mph/s (1.1 m/s^{2})
- Deceleration: 3.0 mph/s (1.3 m/s^{2}) (full service); 3.2 mph/s (1.4 m/s^{2}) (emergency)
- Electric systems: Third rail, 625 V DC
- Current collection: Contact shoe
- Braking systems: Dynamic braking propulsion system; Pneumatic tread brake system
- Safety systems: Dead man's switch, train stop
- Headlight type: Halogen light bulb
- Track gauge: 4 ft 8 1/2 in (1,435 mm) standard gauge

The R179 is a class of 318 New Technology Train subway cars built by Bombardier Transportation for the New York City Subway's B Division. Entering service between 2017 and 2020, the cars replaced all remaining R32s and R42s.

The R179 order originally contained 208 cars that were each 75 feet (23 m) long. In the 2010–2014 Capital Program, the order was changed to 290 cars that were 60 feet (18 m) long – similar to the car lengths of the R143 and R160 cars – with options for up to 130 more cars. The majority of the R179s were supposed to be in 300-foot-long (91 m) five-car sets because the R179s would be replacing the 75-foot-long R44s, which were arranged in 300-foot-long four-car sets. A minority of the R179s were to be arranged in 240-foot-long (73 m) four-car sets. In 2011, the order was reduced to 300 60-foot-long cars with no additional option orders. Because of the R44s' earlier than planned retirement (except the Staten Island Railway cars) and the R32s and R42s assigned to services utilizing eight-car trains at the time, the setup was reversed, with the majority of the R179s being arranged in four-car sets.

The $599 million contract for the R179s' construction was awarded to Bombardier in 2012. At the time, the first R179 train was set to be delivered in December 2014 and the last train would be delivered in July 2017. Because of manufacturing defects during the construction process, the timeline for delivery was pushed back two years, and the cost of the contract rose to $735 million. The first R179 cars were delivered in September 2016, and the first test train of eight cars was placed in service in November 2017. The test train passed its 30-day in-service test in December 2017, which allowed the remaining R179s to be gradually placed in service. All cars were expected to be delivered by early 2019. However, starting in December 2018, several cars had to be withdrawn from service due to defects, and in January 2019, deliveries were temporarily halted while these defects were being fixed. The fleet was temporarily removed from service in January and June 2020 following separate incidents during these months.

In January 2018, sixteen more cars were added to the order as part of a settlement so that there would be 24 five-car sets instead of the 8 originally projected and 49 four-car sets instead of the original 65. In January 2019, two more cars were added to the order as a part of a settlement for further damages. All cars were delivered by December 2019, and had entered service by March 2020.

== Description and features ==
The R179s are numbered 3010–3327. Cars numbered 3010–3049 and 3238–3327 are configured into five-car sets, comprising 130 cars. Cars numbered 3050–3237 are configured into four-car sets, comprising 188 cars. All five-car sets are assigned to 207th Street Yard and run on the A and Rockaway Park Shuttle. The four-car sets are split almost evenly between 207th Street Yard and East New York Yard. All four-car sets run on the C, J, M, and Z. The order replaced all remaining R32s and R42s, which dated to the 1960s and early 1970s. The R179s were also the last subway car order to be built by Bombardier Transportation prior to being acquired by Alstom in January 2021. The R179s are visually very similar to the R143s and R160s, but the three car types are not interoperable with each other due to electrical incompatibilities between them.

The R179s, like the R160s, employ an advanced alternative to electronic strip maps called the "Flexible Information and Notice Display" ("FIND"), which are manufactured by Axion Technologies Ltd. This includes an LCD screen displaying the route, route information, and advertisements, as well as a dynamic red, yellow, and green LED strip map that displays the next ten stations, plus five consecutive "further stops" to riders. There are three of these in every car. The display updates the stations at every stop, also giving the number of stops to each station listed. This allows for instant route or line changes with the correct information, which includes, but is not limited to, omitting certain stops (displayed as "Will not stop" in red). However, the LCD displays on the R179s that show the route are slightly larger than those on the R160s. Additionally, when the FIND goes blank, the R179 FIND displays "Route change: this map is not in use", as opposed to the R160 FIND, which displays "Listen to train crew for announcement." The R179s also utilize the older door closing and PSA chimes used on the R142s and R142As, as opposed to the newer chimes used on other NTT rolling stock. Finally, the side metal door frames on the R179s are noticeably broader than those found on the R160s. They are also the first B Division NTT trains to come with LED interior lighting instead of the fluorescent lighting used on the R160s.

Communication-based train control (CBTC) equipment has begun to be installed in all R179s that are already on MTA property, with the first trains running in CBTC passenger service in December 2024, in conjunction with the ongoing automation of B Division lines.

The R179s are equipped with looped stanchions in the interiors of trains to provide passengers on crowded trains with a greater amount of pole surface area to grab on to. This feature was previously tested on R160A set 9798–9802 and has been implemented on other trains as a part of a plan to fix the subway's 2017 state of emergency.

The R179 cars are equipped with updated control systems, HVAC, and public address systems. The new HVAC systems are noticeably quieter on the outside of the train, compared to previous generations of New Technology Trains. The R179s also have larger picture windows, resulting in a tighter cab for the conductors and train operators, since slightly more space was required to accommodate the HVACs.

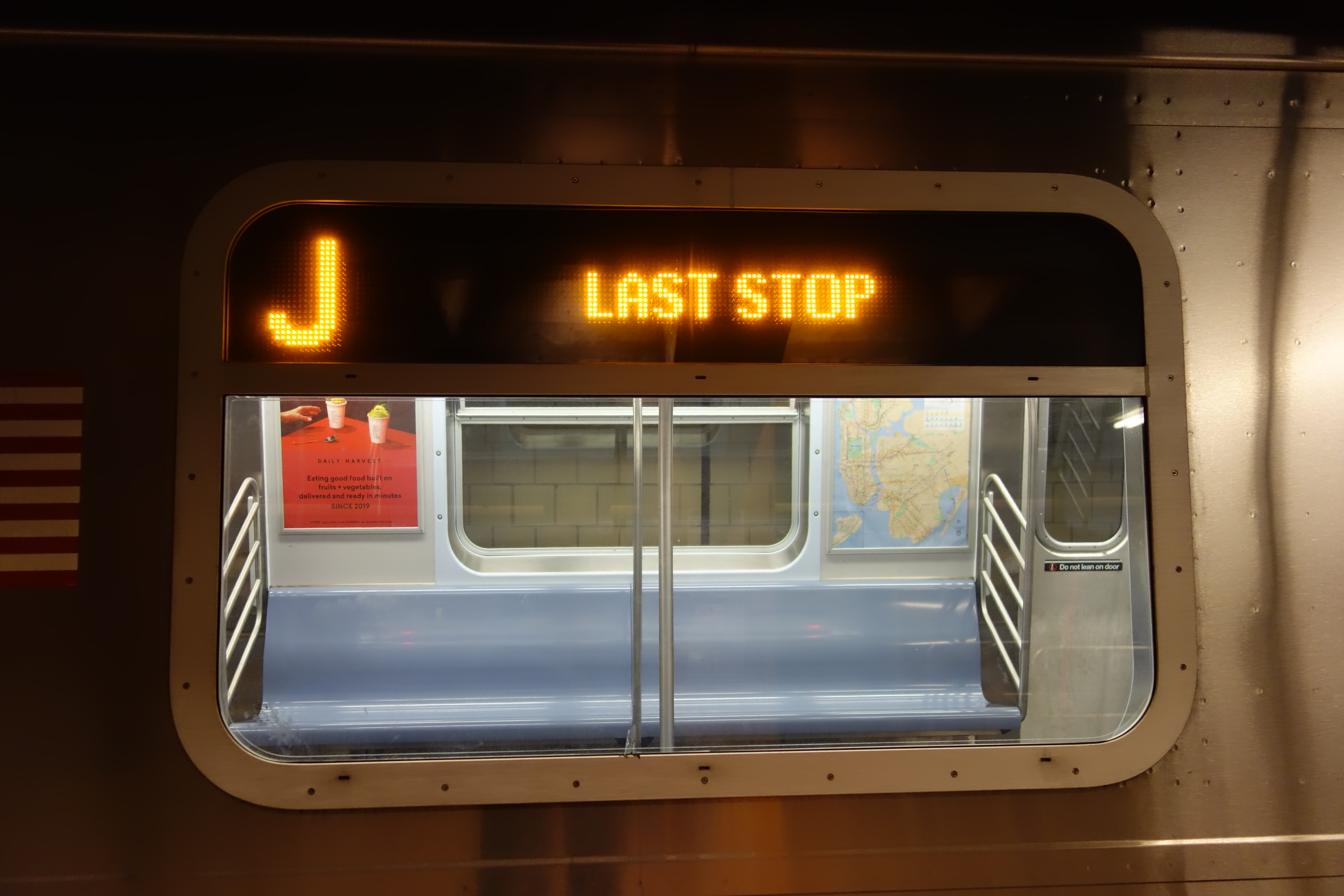
The LED side destination sign of an R179 car

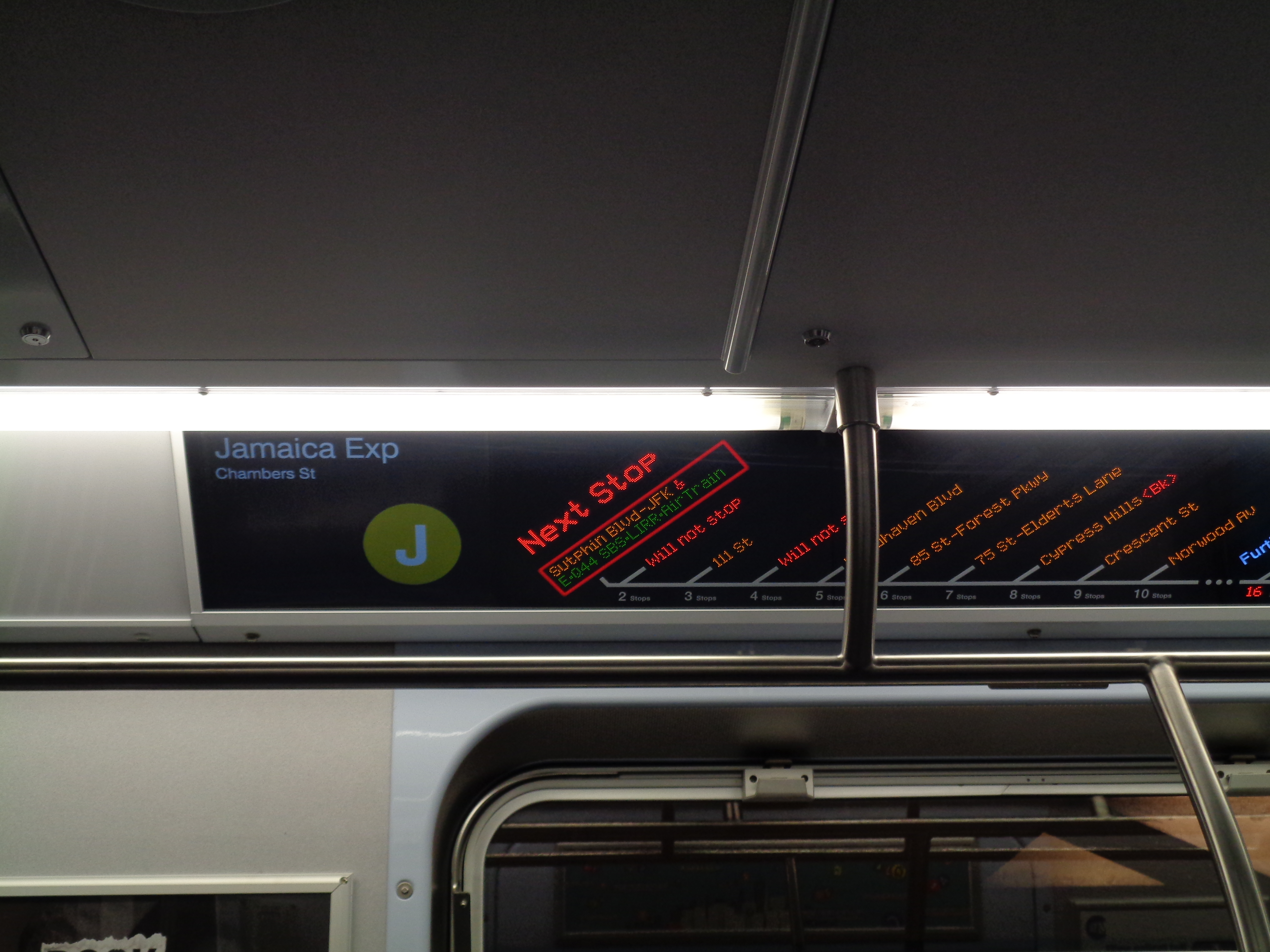
Interior of R160 subway train refurbished in 2017

== History ==
=== Contract plans ===
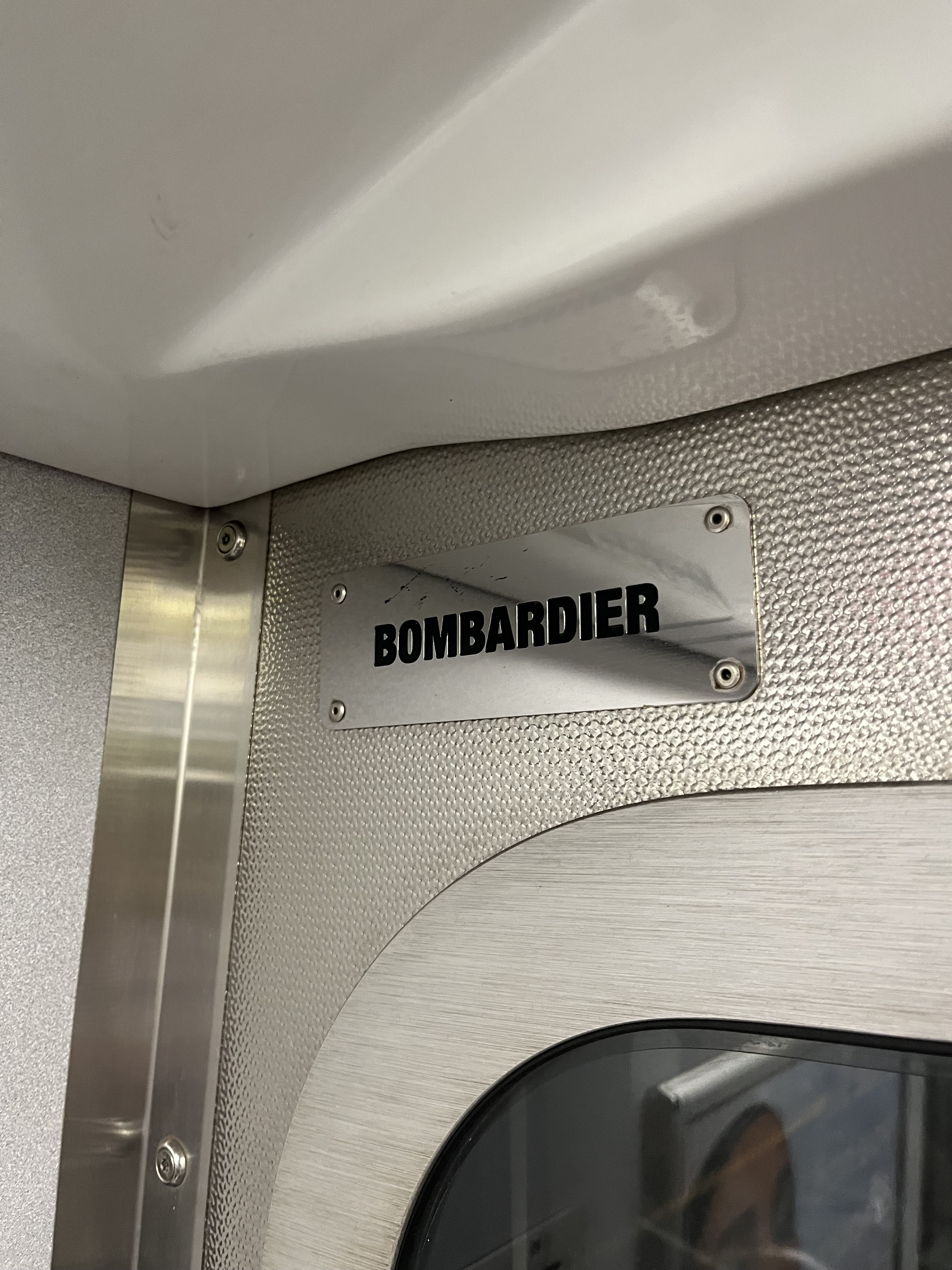
Builders plate of the R179s

The R179 contract originally consisted of 208 75-foot-long (23 m) cars. Later, in the 2010–2014 Capital Program, the proposed order was expanded to 420 cars (340 for the New York City Subway and 80 for the Staten Island Railway). This consisted of 290 base order cars (250 arranged in 5-car sets and the remaining 40 arranged in 4-car sets), with two option orders. The first option called for 50 cars arranged in 5-car sets. There was also a second option for 80 additional cars, which would have supplied cars for the Second Avenue Subway Phase I service. The proposed MTA 2010–2014 Capital Program pointed towards an order of 60-foot (18.29 m) cars.

The official RFP was issued on June 3, 2010. Bids were due by the following August 13, and in April 2011, the contract was expected to be awarded for $637.8 million. However, there were delays with negotiation problems, and the projected cost went up to $748 million in October 2011. In November 2011, the order was altered to a base order of 300 cars (260 arranged in 4-car sets and the remaining 40 arranged in 5-car sets), with no options.

The contract was finally awarded to Bombardier Transportation on March 24, 2012, for $599 million, below the projected cost. The joint venture Alskaw Inc., made up of the companies Kawasaki and Alstom, which built the R160A/B cars, protested the award of the contract to Bombardier immediately after the MTA Board approved the contract. However, the protest was denied, and Bombardier signed the contract on June 4, 2012.

A 2012 news report from the New York Daily News indicated that a high-ranking MTA official had been in talks with car builder Bombardier Transportation, Inc. for a job. This prompted an ethics investigation but has since been resolved.

The R179s were originally intended to replace all the R44s, but due to structural integrity issues found on New York City Transit's R44s in late 2009, those cars' retirement was facilitated by an option order of R160s. Additionally, the Metropolitan Transportation Authority later dropped the plan to order R179s for the Staten Island Railway, instead opting to overhaul some R46s to replace the existing R44s there (which has also since been canceled). The R179s were then intended to retire all remaining R42s (50 cars) and R32s (222 cars). Some R32s were expected to be retained due to delays in the delivery of the R179s and the potential need for extra rolling stock to provide additional service. As a result, the MTA planned to spend another $49.2 million to refurbish and maintain 132 to 164 R32 cars through 2018 and then 110 R32 cars through 2019, before finally replacing the remaining cars with the R211As. In addition, the MTA anticipated to have most, if not all R179s delivered before the since-canceled full shutdown of the 14th Street Tunnel in April 2019. However, by January 21, 2020, it was again decided to retire the R32s with the arrival of the R179s.

=== Manufacturing issues ===
In a timeline set in October 2012, the first test train was scheduled to arrive on December 22, 2014, the first production unit was scheduled to arrive on July 27, 2015, and the entire order was to be completed on January 30, 2017. After some delays in starting production, a non-operational mockup was built in late November 2013. Delivery of the first 10-car test train was now scheduled for the third quarter of 2014, though delivery of the production cars was still scheduled to begin July 2015 and continue through January 2017. However, as NYCTA's and Bombardier's inspectors found cracks due to welding issues in the prototype train's chassis, the entire lot was rejected, and the delivery schedule was pushed back by two years.

The delays in delivery have increased the cost of the cars from $599 million to $735 million; these additional costs add to the costs required to maintain older cars. In addition, because of the 2-year delay in producing the R179s, Bombardier was banned from bidding on the R211 contract, which would replace other older B Division rolling stock. The R211 contract was eventually awarded to Kawasaki in January 2018.

=== Delivery and testing ===
Bombardier built the cars in its La Pocatière, Quebec in Canada and Plattsburgh, New York facility. The first five-car set of R179s (3010–3014) was delivered to the New York City Transit Authority between September 6 and 8, 2016. The next five cars (3015–3019) were delayed and were delivered between November 15 and 17, 2016, forming a complete pilot ten-car train for acceptance testing and evaluation. The first four-car set of R179s (3050–3053) was delivered between December 21 and 22, 2016. The next four cars (3054–3057) were delivered in January 2017, forming a complete eight-car train for acceptance testing and evaluation. A delivery plan from January 2017 anticipated a rate of one car per day starting from November 2017, in an effort to have all cars on property by July 2018. However, additional delays have occurred, and by October 2018, deliveries were not expected to be completed until March 2019. Due to continuing delays in the production of the R179s, the order was increased by 16 additional B-cars on January 22, 2018. The order then consisted of 316 cars (120 arranged in 5-car sets and 196 arranged in 4-car sets). On January 22, 2019, another settlement added 2 B-cars to the order. As of July 2019, deliveries were not expected to be completed until November 2019.

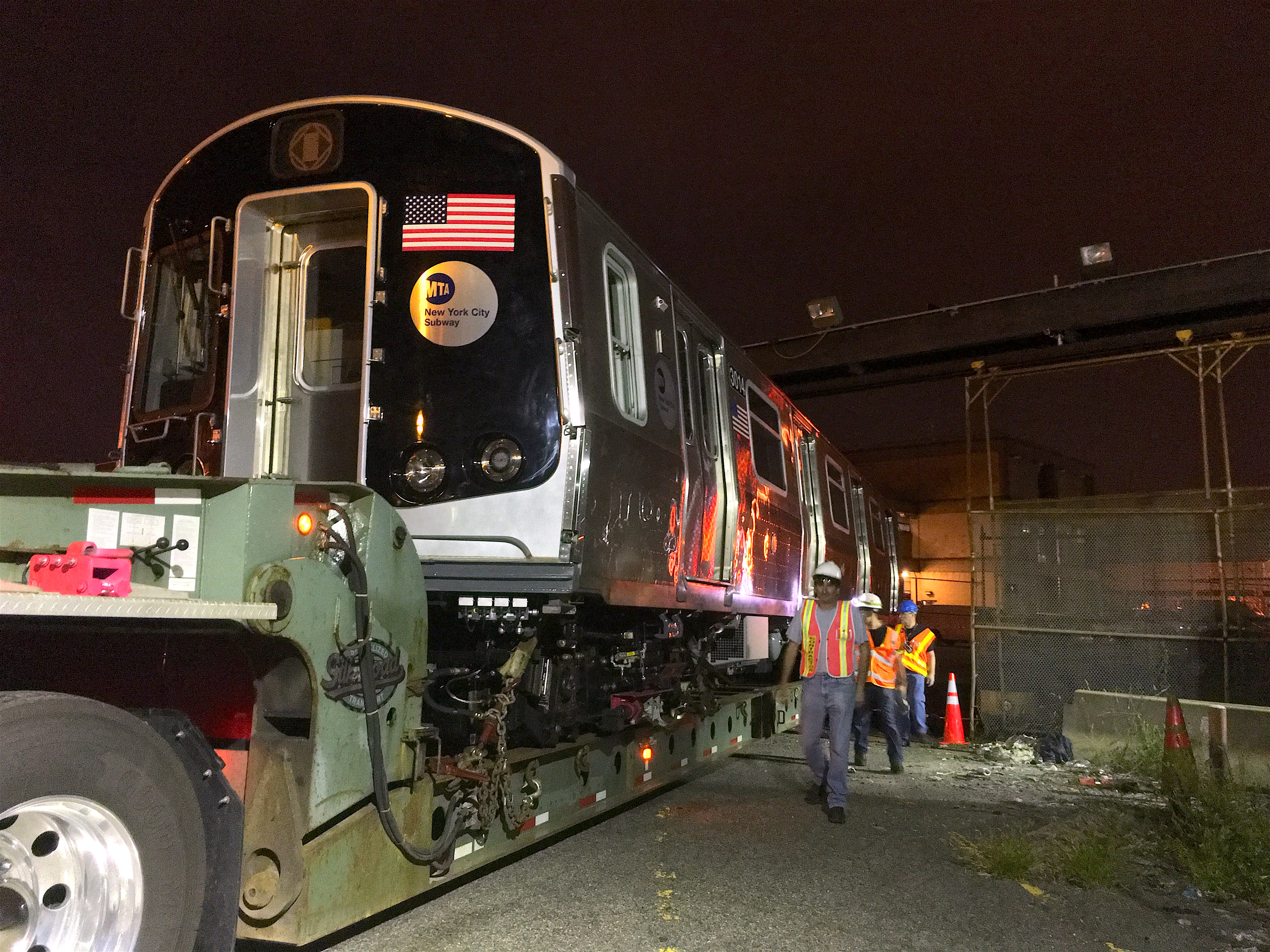
R179 car 3014 being delivered on September 6, 2016

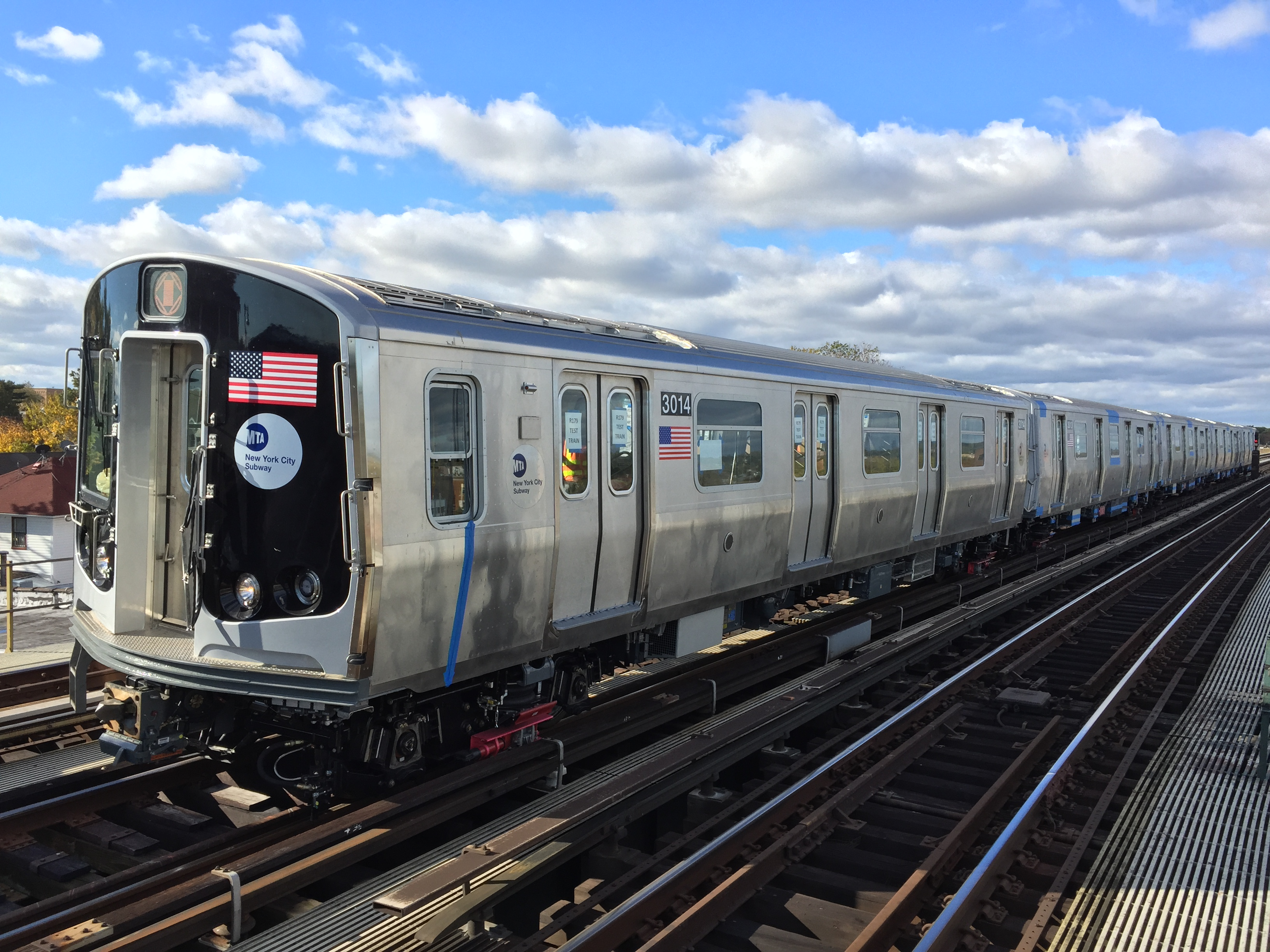
R179 testing at Rockaway Boulevard station on October 28, 2016

=== Service ===
The four-car R179 sets were placed into revenue service on the J on November 19, 2017, for a 30-day in-service acceptance test, after slightly over a year of successful non-revenue service tests. During the first two weeks of the testing period, the MTA identified three major issues in the train, which have since been fixed. After successful completion, the four-car R179 sets officially entered revenue service on December 27, 2017, a month later than originally planned. The pilot five-car R179 sets underwent specification modifications at Bombardier's Kanona Facility in summer 2018 and were re-delivered for further testing. After two years of modifications and testing, the train was placed into service on the A on February 10, 2019, for a 30-day in-service acceptance test. The train completed the test on March 11, 2019, and entered regular service the next day.

By the start of December 2018, some trains had to be taken out of service due to manufacturing defects such as doors, propulsion, and air compressors issues. The next month, the MTA revealed that 162 cars had been delivered, of which 128 (comprising sixteen 8-car trains) had been placed in service. In early January 2019, NYCTA President Andy Byford ordered more R179 cars to be removed from passenger service and the temporary suspension of the delivery of further cars until Bombardier corrected all defects found within them. After the issues were resolved, deliveries recommenced in early February 2019.

By December 30, 2019, all 318 cars had been delivered. Even after all cars had been delivered, an audit by Comptroller Scott Stringer found that only 18 of the original 300 cars had been delivered within the contract's deadline. Additionally, on January 8, 2020, all cars in revenue were taken out of passenger service following two incidents involving R179 cars with defective door parts on the C train, forcing several older cars to fill in for service while the R179s underwent safety inspections. The January incidents raised concerns that train doors could malfunction while the trains were in service, and that doors could potentially open up when the train was in motion. Due to this incident and prior issues, the R179s became known as "lemons". Aside from the door issues, the Transport Workers Union of America has complained about problems with operating the R179, such as stiff windows, slippery controls, and other design flaws. The R179s were repaired, and the fleet re-entered service on January 24, 2020. By March 24, 2020, all 318 cars entered service.

On June 3, 2020, a set of R179s running on the A train had its link bar separated between the sixth and seventh cars while in service at Chambers Street station, causing the consist to be split into two. The entire fleet was subsequently pulled from service and underwent thorough safety investigations to address any in-service issues that do occur. A portion of the recently retired R32 fleet was reactivated to fill in for the fleet shortage during the investigations. After thorough safety investigations, the fleet re-entered service on September 23, 2020.

== In popular culture ==
An R179 is featured in the second season of Russian Doll.
