= R38 (New York City Subway car) =

Retired class of New York City Subway car

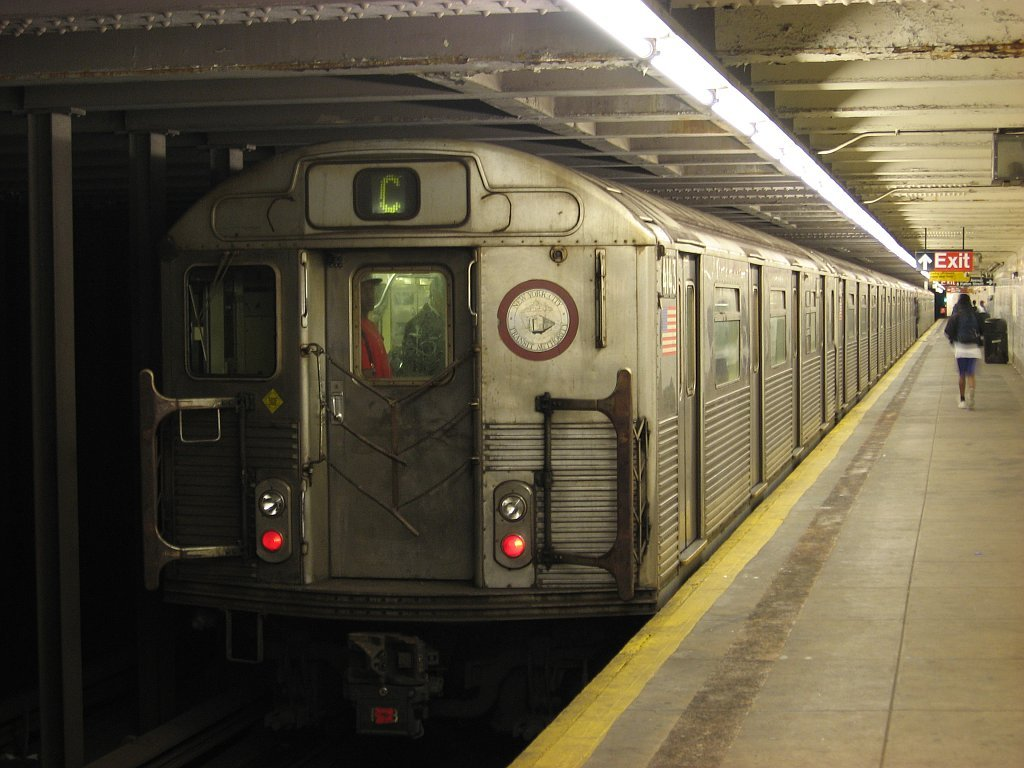
- An R38 train on the C at Kingston–Throop Avenues

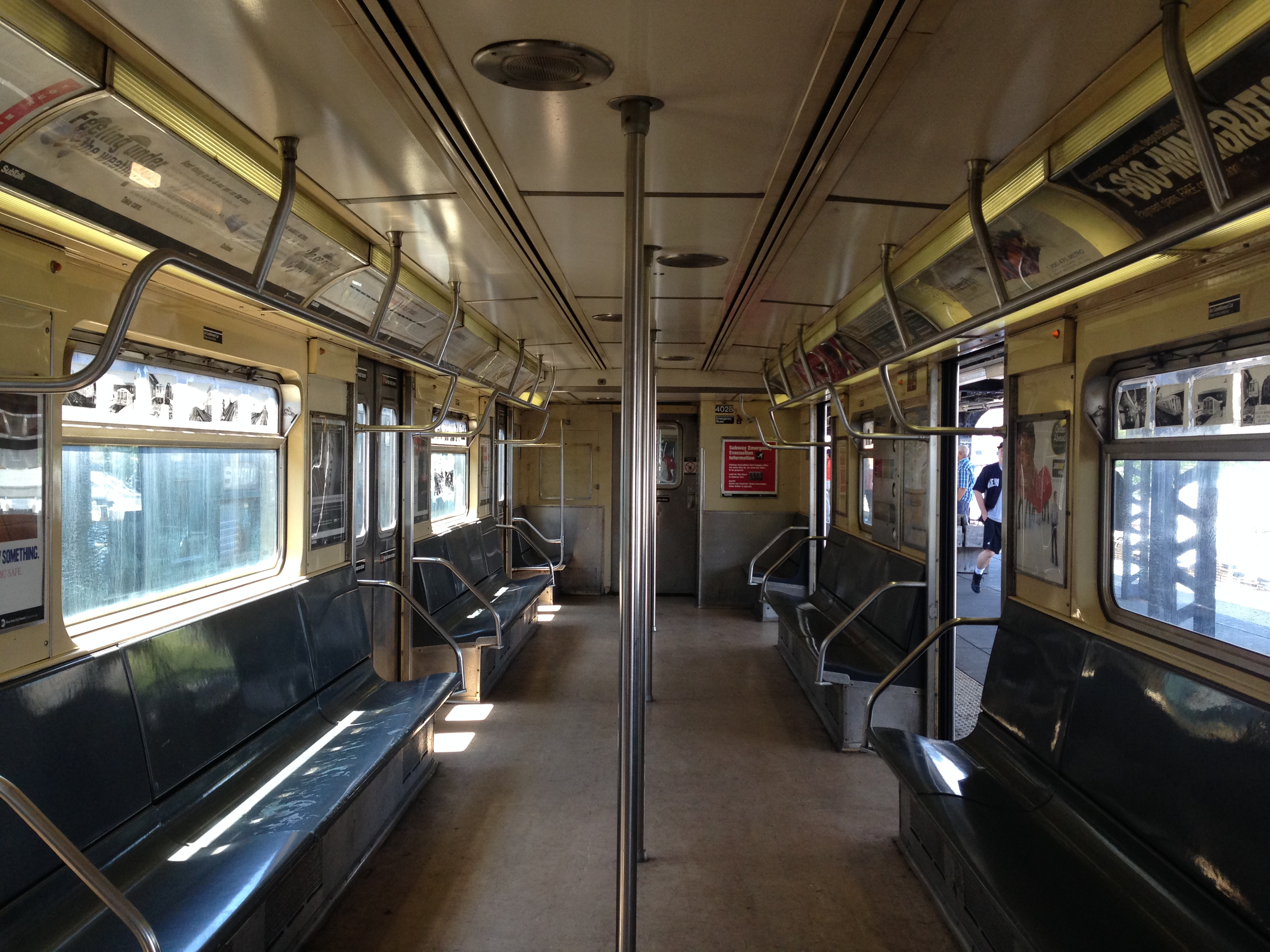
- Interior of an R38 car
- In service: August 23, 1966 – March 18, 2009 (42 years)
- Manufacturer: St. Louis Car Company
- Built at: St. Louis, Missouri, US
- Constructed: 1966–1967
- Entered service: 1966
- Refurbished: 1987–1988
- Scrapped: 2008–2009
- Number built: 200
- Number preserved: 2
- Number scrapped: 198
- Successor: R160
- Formation: Married Pairs
- Fleet numbers: 3950–4149
- Capacity: 50 (seated)
- Operator: New York City Subway

Specifications
- Car body construction: Stainless steel with carbon steel chassis and underbody
- Car length: 60 ft (18.29 m)
- Width: 10 ft (3.05 m)
- Height: 12.08 ft (3.68 m)
- Platform height: 3.76 ft (1.15 m)
- Doors: 8 sets of 45 inch wide side doors per car
- Maximum speed: 55 mph (89 km/h)
- Weight: 77,420 lb (35,117 kg)
- Traction system: General Electric SCM 17KG192AE2/H7 propulsion system
- Traction motors: General Electric 1257E1
- Power output: 115 hp (86 kW) per axle
- Braking systems: Westinghouse Air Brake Company E2 "SMEE" Braking System, American Steel Foundries simplex unit cylinder clasp (tread) brake
- Track gauge: 4 ft 8 1/2 in (1,435 mm) standard gauge

The R38 was a New York City Subway car model built by the St. Louis Car Company from 1966 to 1967 for the IND/BMT B Division. Two hundred were built in married pairs. In addition, the R38s were built to supply extra trains for service changes resulting from the 1967 opening of the Chrystie Street Connection. Moreover, the R38 was the first subway car fleet to have air conditioning installed.

The first R38s entered service on August 23, 1966. In 1987–1988, all R38s were rebuilt by General Electric. The R160 order replaced the entire fleet of R38s, the last of which ran on March 18, 2009. After retirement, all cars but one pair, which is preserved by the New York Transit Museum, were stripped and sunken as artificial reefs.

== Description ==
The R38s were numbered 3950–4149. The cars were arranged in "married pairs" of two cars semi-permanently coupled together by a drawbar. Even-numbered cars were known as "B" cars, while odd-numbered cars were known as "A" cars.

The R38 was the second subway car order to be built with stainless steel exteriors, the first being the R32 order in 1964. The cars were built with aluminium roofs, vandal-proof fiberglass seats, and with indirect fluorescent lighting, which also provided illumination of the advertisement cards as well, a similar setup to the last 150 R32 cars delivered in 1965 numbered 3800–3949. Another noticeable difference between the two models was that the R38s' exteriors featured a fluted design that covered roughly half of their sides, while the R32s' sides were essentially fully covered by a fluted design. Still, due to the similarities between both fleets, R38s often operated in mixed-consists with R32s.

The R38 was the first successful subway car fleet to have air conditioning installed after earlier prototypes failed on older subway cars. The last ten cars delivered (4140–4149) came factory equipped with Stone-Safety 10-ton split system air conditioning system featuring the compressor/condenser units mounted under the cars, while the evaporator units were installed on the top interior ends of the car in 1967. The first six air conditioned cars came into service on the F train on July 19, 1967. The six-week experiment was a success after past failures, and air conditioning would soon, but not immediately, become standard equipment on new rolling stock built for the system, since the first 200 R40 cars were built without air conditioning. The air conditioned cars cost $40,000 more than the non-air conditioned cars. From this point on, the New York City Transit Authority began adopting air conditioning as standard equipment on all new cars, and older model cars were retrofitted with AC units to make life much more bearable throughout the subway system. The Stone-Safety Air Conditioning system was adopted from their standard railroad and commuter coach air conditioning systems, and it proved very successful.

== History ==
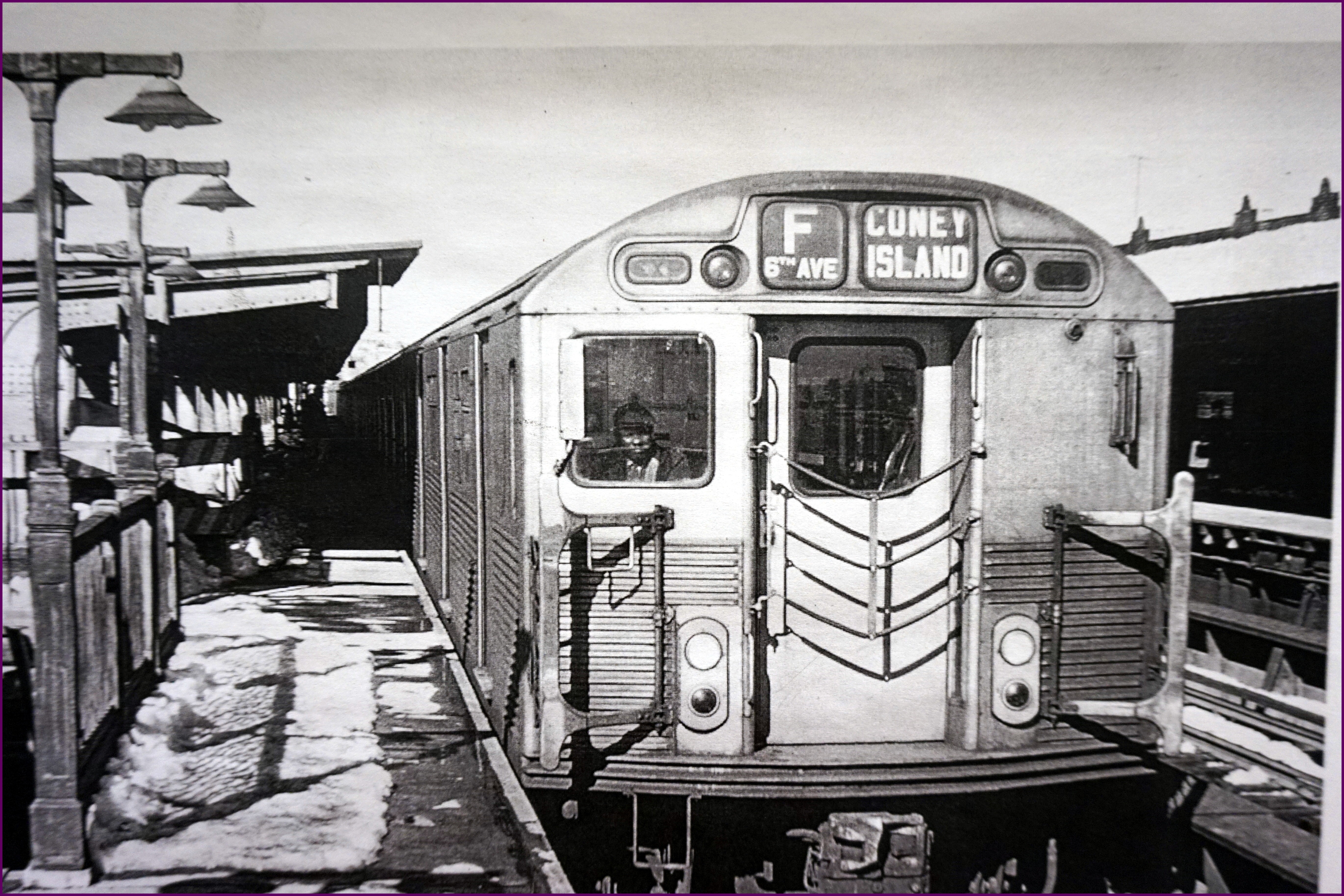
R38s in service on the F in the 1960s

In March 1965, the New York City Transit Authority, continuing its program of car replacement, ordered 200 additional cars for the B Division from the St. Louis Car Company. These cars were the first to replace cars for the IND since it started operation in 1932. They also supplied extra trains for the Chrystie Street Connection, which opened on November 27, 1967. St. Louis was chosen after the first three bids were deemed as too high, with the cost savings totalling $500,000.

The first two trains of R38s were placed in service at Queens Plaza after a brief introductory ceremony attended by Mayor John V. Lindsay, NYCTA Chairman Joseph O'Grady, and NYCTA Commissioners Joseph Gilhooly and Daniel T. Scannell on the E and F on August 23, 1966. Though there were controversies about diverting these cars from their original assignment for the D, it was decided to introduce the R38s on the IND Queens Boulevard Line, as the line was short of cars and the R1–9s assigned to Jamaica Yard were in a bad state of disrepair.

=== Overhaul and mishaps ===
Cars 3990–3991 & 4000–4001 were involved in an incident on June 11, 1972, at the bumper blocks within the relay area east of the Jamaica–179 Street Terminal. These cars were stored in very heavily damaged condition at Coney Island Yard until they were scrapped in 1983.

The R38s were rebuilt between 1986 and 1988 under the General Overhaul (GOH) program as a result of deferred maintenance in the transit system during the 1970s and 1980s. 196 cars were rebuilt off-property by General Electric at its facility in Buffalo, New York along with ten R32s as prototype rebuilds with interiors resembling the rebuilt R38s. All cars received air conditioning which necessitated the removal of the route and destination rollsign curtain mechanisms, as the air conditioning units made the location where the front signs are located inaccessible for train crew members to change manually; the rollsigns were replaced with electronic flipdot displays controlled from the crew member's cab that displayed only the route. The distinctive "EXP" (express) and "LOCAL" marker lights were removed. The first rebuilt train of R38s (cars 3992–3993, 4018–4019, 4048–4049, 4092–4093, and 4132–4133) entered service on the A on May 28, 1987. The last unrebuilt train of R38s made its last trip on the A before being sent out to be rebuilt on July 11, 1988. By December 1988, all overhauled cars were in service.

=== Retirement ===
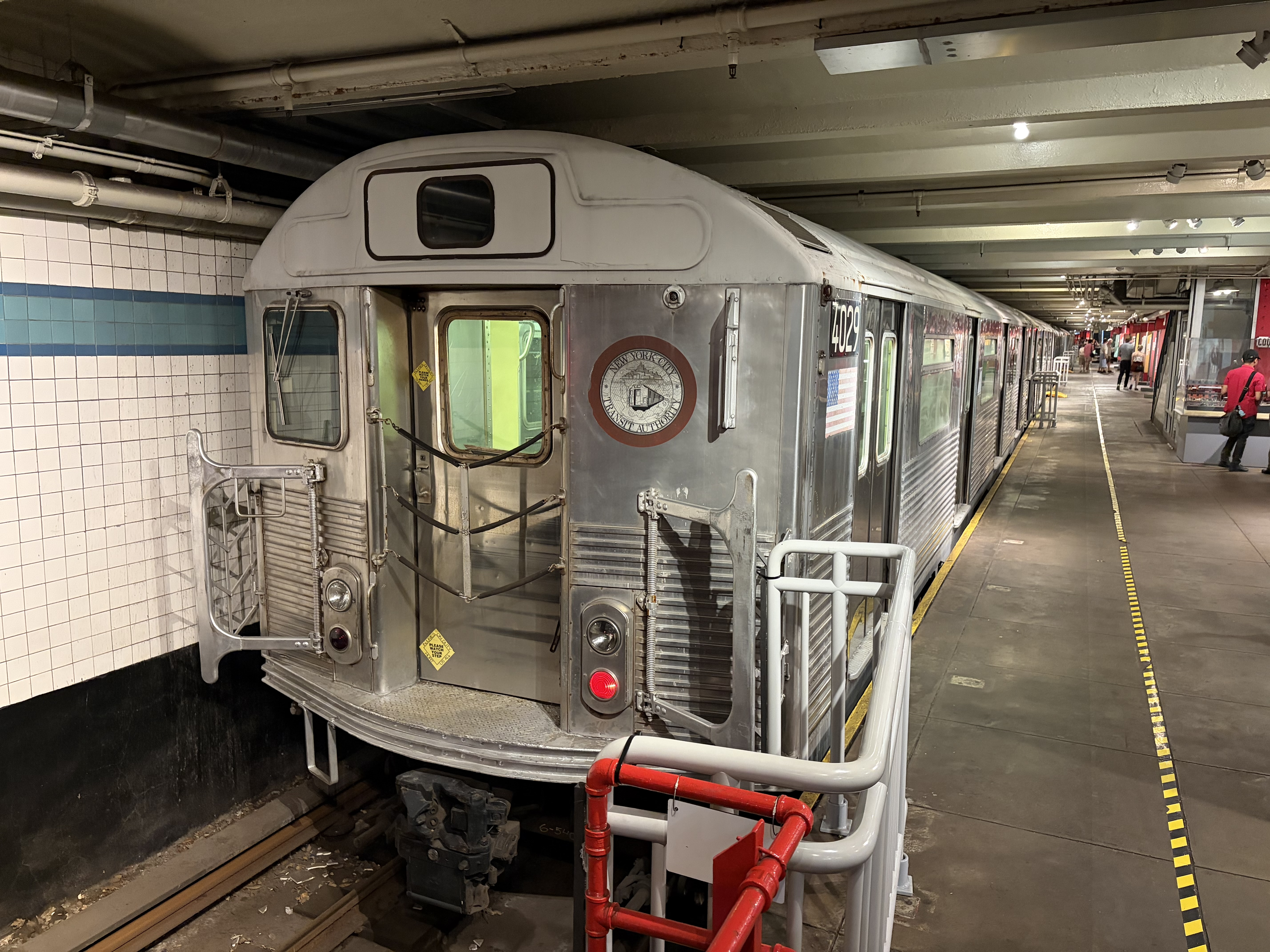
R38 cars 4028 and 4029 on display at the New York Transit Museum

In July 2002, the MTA awarded contracts to Alstom and Kawasaki for the delivery and purchase of new subway cars (the R160) in order to retire the R38s, as well as the other B Division 60-foot cars (R32s, R40s, and R42s). In December 2007, an arrangement was made with the Delaware Department of Natural Resources and Environmental Control to create artificial reefs with the R38s and other retired subway car models off of the coast of Cape Henlopen, Delaware, similar to how the A Division Redbirds were processed and reefed from 2001 to 2003. Cars 4088–4089 were the first pair of R38s to be stripped and sunken as artificial reefs in March 2008; they were retired in the early 2000s and used as parts sources. The rest of the fleet began being withdrawn from service in November. The last two cars on the active roster (cars 4098–4099) made their last trip on the C on March 18, 2009.

Cars 4028–4029 are preserved for the New York Transit Museum. They were restored to operating status in 2013–2014 and have been operating on New York City Transit Museum-sponsored excursions since August 3, 2014, specifically on the Train of Many Metals (TOMM).

== In popular culture ==
=== Movies ===
- The opening scene of the 1977 movie Saturday Night Fever shows a train of R38s on the B, prior to refurbishment.
- The scene on a subway train in the 1988 movie Coming to America was shot on an R38 on the E, also prior to refurbishment.
- The subway scene in the 1988 movie Crocodile Dundee II features an R38 train on the A, after refurbishment.
- The subway scene in the 1990 movie Ghost features an R38 train on the A, also after refurbishment.
- The subway scene in the 2002 movie Men in Black II, features an alien entering a tunnel. Once there, it attacks and devours most of a subway train (which is a combination of R32 and R38 cars) until Agent J destroys it. He is then seen walking out of the station, 81st Street – Museum of Natural History, on the C. This movie also depicts the R38s after refurbishment.

=== Video games ===
- The trains in the video game Grand Theft Auto IV are based on the R38s.
