= R32 (New York City Subway car) =

Retired class of New York City Subway car

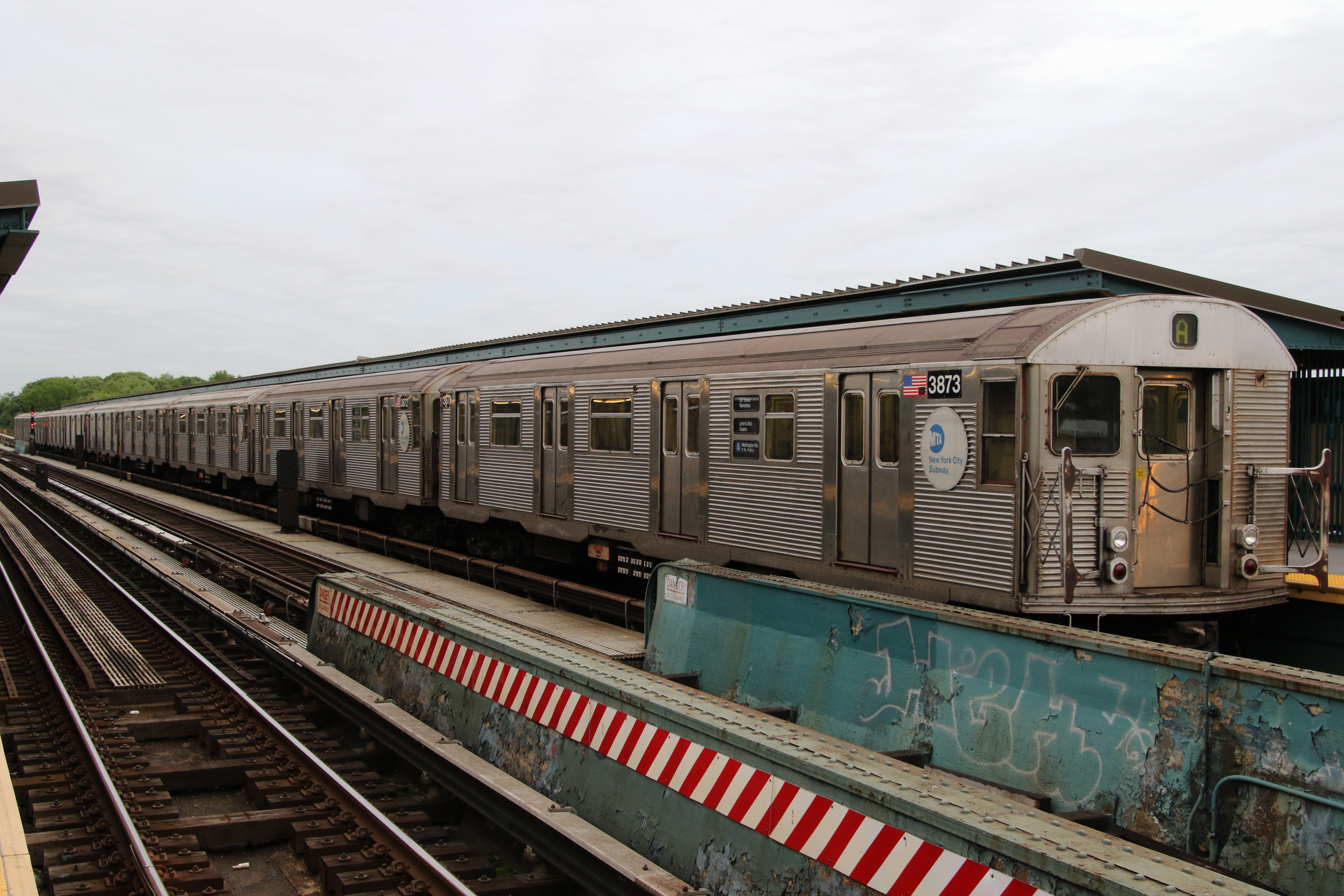
- An R32 train on the A at 80th Street

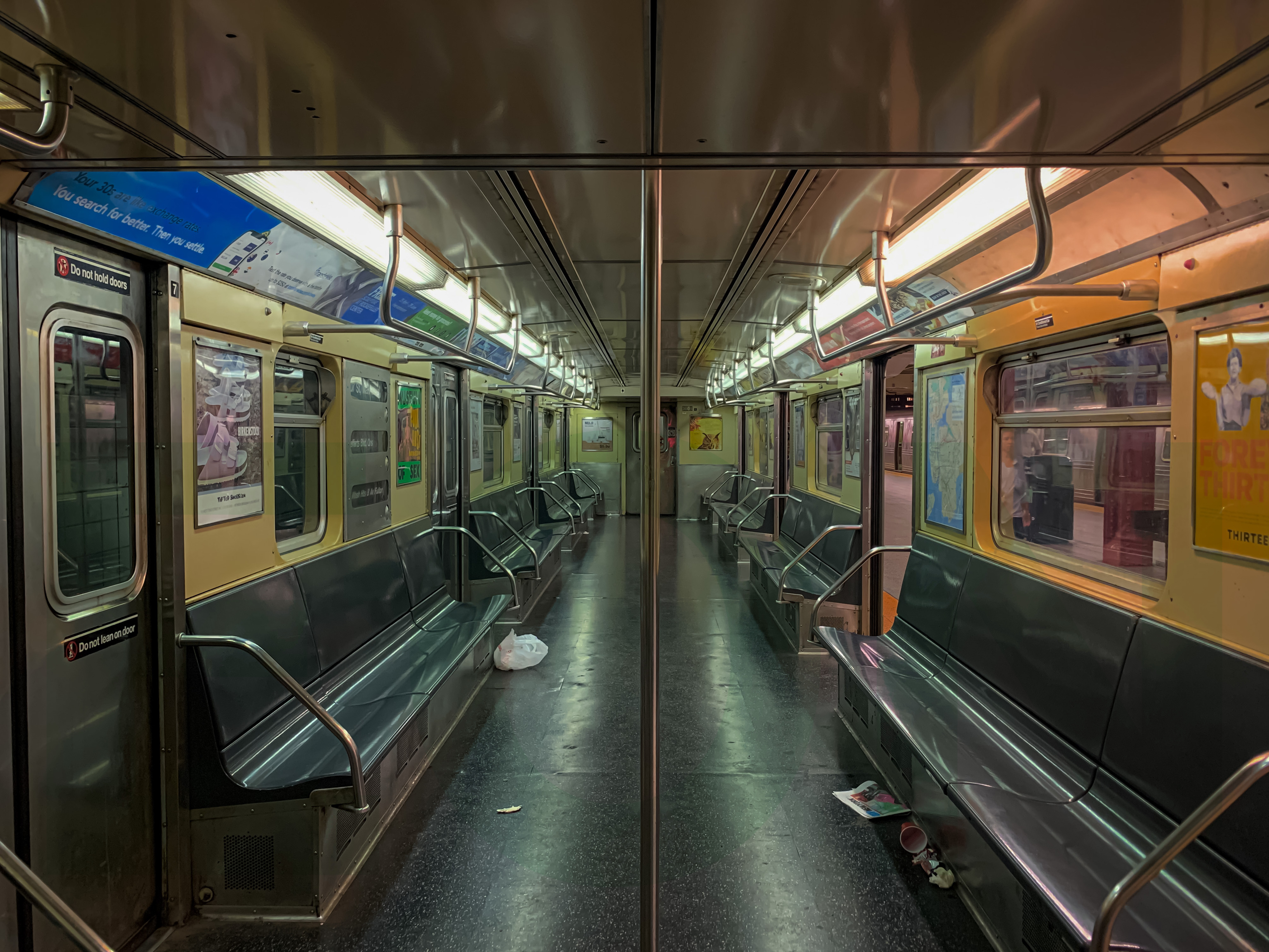
- Interior of an R32 car
- In service: September 14, 1964 – January 9, 2022 (57 years)
- Manufacturer: Budd Company
- Built at: Philadelphia
- Replaced: Many remaining BMT Standards; All remaining BMT D Triplex Units
- Constructed: 1964–1965
- Entered service: September 14, 1964
- Refurbished: 1986–1990
- Scrapped: 2007–2008 (GE-rebuilt cars); 2008–2009 (Phase II cars); 2009–2013 (some Phase I cars); 2022–present (remaining Phase I cars)
- Number built: 600
- Number in service: (2 in work service)
- Number preserved: 22
- Number scrapped: 555
- Successor: R160 (GE, Phase II, and some Phase I cars); R179 (remaining Phase I cars)
- Formation: Married Pairs
- Fleet numbers: 3350–3949 (3659 renumbered to 3348)
- Capacity: 50 (seated) 175 (standing)
- Operator: New York City Subway

Specifications
- Car body construction: Stainless steel
- Train length: 2 car train: 120.25 feet (36.65 m); 4 car train: 240.50 feet (73.30 m); 6 car train: 360.75 feet (109.96 m); 8 car train: 481 feet (147 m); 10 car train: 601.25 feet (183.26 m)
- Car length: over coupler faces: 60 ft 3 in (18.36 m)
- Width: 10 ft (3,048 mm)
- Height: 12.08 ft (3,682 mm)
- Platform height: 3.76 ft (1.15 m)
- Entry: 3.76 ft (1.15 m)
- Doors: 8 sets of 45-inch (1,143 mm) wide side doors per car
- Maximum speed: 55 mph (89 km/h)
- Weight: 79,930 lb (36,260 kg) (post-rebuild) (70,000 lb or 31,751 kg when delivered)
- Traction system: General Electric SCM 17KG192E3, DC propulsion system
- Traction motors: GE 1257E1 motors or Westinghouse 1447JR (115 hp or 86 kW per axle) (R32GE cars used 115 hp or 86 kW 1257F motors, all cars originally had Westinghouse 1447JR motors)
- Acceleration: 2.5 mph/s (4.0 km/(h⋅s))
- Deceleration: 3.0 mph/s (4.8 km/(h⋅s)) (full service); 3.2 mph/s (5.1 km/(h⋅s)) (emergency)
- Electric systems: 600 V DC third rail
- Current collection: Contact shoe
- Braking systems: WABCO RT2 SMEE braking system, A.S.F. simplex unit cylinder clasp (tread) brake
- Safety system: tripcock
- Coupling system: Westinghouse H2C
- Headlight type: halogen light bulb
- Track gauge: 4 ft 8 1/2 in (1,435 mm) standard gauge

The R32 was a New York City Subway car model built by the Budd Company from 1964 to 1965 for the IND/BMT B Division. A total of 600 R32s were built, numbered 3350–3949, though some cars were re-numbered. The R32 contract was divided into two subcontracts of 300 cars each: R32 (cars 3350–3649) and R32A (cars 3650–3949); the former was paid by the city's capital budget and the latter was paid through a revenue bond. All were arranged as married pairs.

The R32s were the first mass-produced stainless steel cars built for the New York City Subway. A ceremonial introduction trip for the new R32 "Brightliners" cars was held on September 9, 1964. Various modifications were made over the years to the R32 fleet. In the late 1980s, all of the R32 cars were rebuilt, with ten cars being rebuilt by General Electric and the remaining cars being rebuilt by Morrison–Knudsen. As part of the refurbishment, the original rollsigns and express/local marker lights at the end of each car were replaced with flipdot signs. After refurbishment, the R32 and R32A cars were renamed R32 Phase I, R32 Phase II, and R32 GE.

The R160 order was to replace all R32s in the late 2000s. However, about one-third of the original fleet remained when it was decided to retire the NYCT R44s instead. The R179 order replaced the remainder of the R32s in the early 2020s. The R32s temporarily resumed service from July 1, 2020 through October 8, 2020 when the R179s were pulled from service. A series of farewell trips with the final train of R32s running in passenger service began on December 19, 2021 and concluded on January 9, 2022. After retirement, most of the R32s were scrapped, sunk as artificial reefs, or placed into storage, but some have been preserved, and others retained for various purposes.

== Description ==
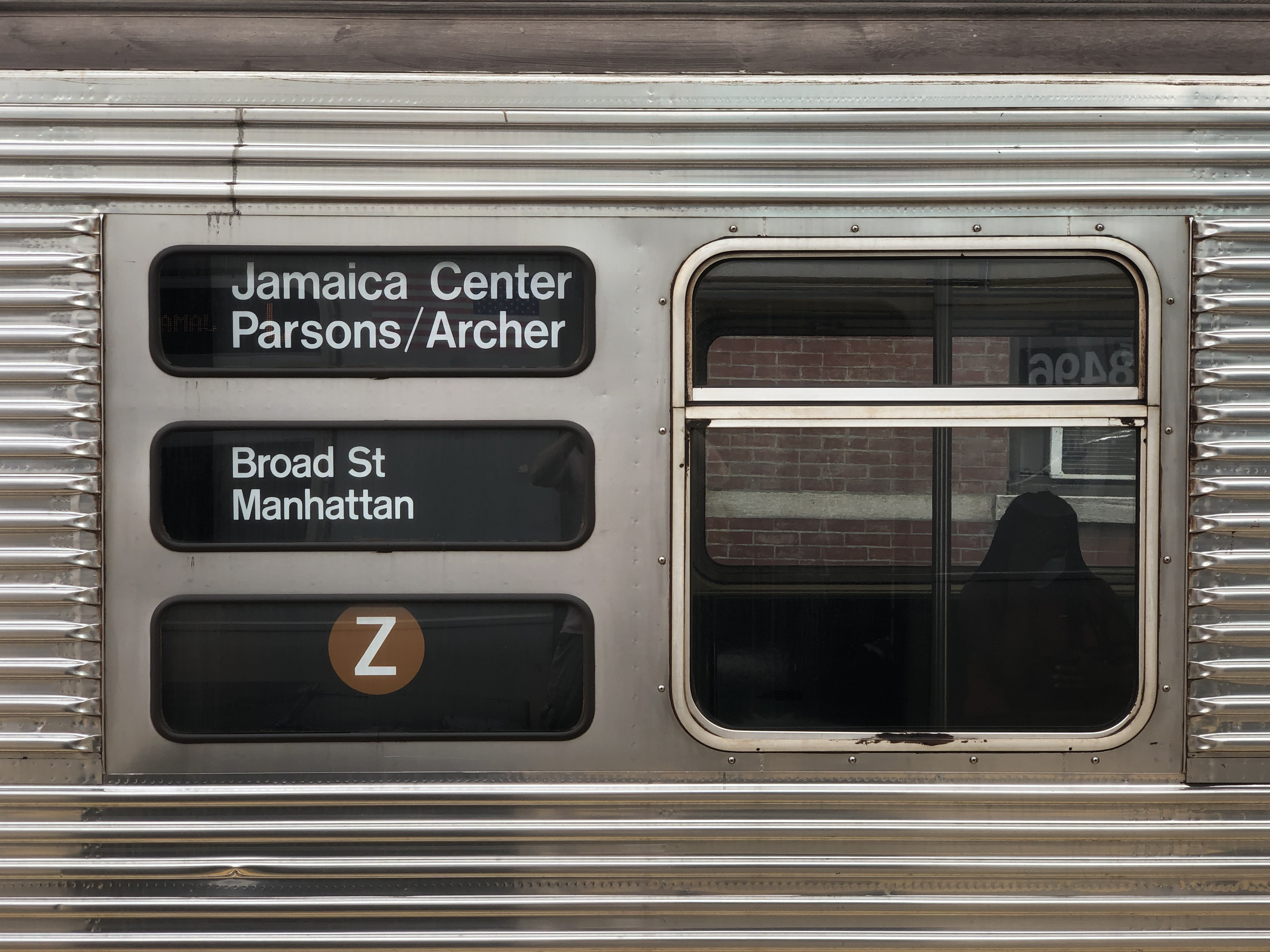
Side route and destination rollsigns of an R32

The R32s were numbered 3350–3949, although some cars were re-numbered outside of this range or to different numbers in this range. They were the first cars to introduce all-mylar route and destination rollsigns instead of the former cotton cloth or linen type rollsigns found on prior rail cars.

The R32 contract was divided into two subcontracts of 300 cars each: R32 (cars 3350–3649) and R32A (cars 3650–3949). The R32As were funded through the proceeds of a revenue bond, while the R32s were paid for out of the 1963–1964 New York City capital budget. The two subcontracts differed with the first 150 R32s (3350–3499) having visible bulkhead horns; these were the last cars to be built with this feature. This feature can also be found on the Redbirds, R27s, and R30s, along with various older trains. Another distinctive difference was the interior lighting featuring backlit ad-signs on R32A cars 3800–3949.

The R32s were the first mass-produced stainless steel cars built for the New York City Subway. Two previous Budd orders (the BMT Zephyr and the R11s) were limited production and/or experimental orders. The horizontally ribbed, shiny, and unpainted stainless exteriors earned the cars the nickname Brightliners. The use of stainless steel reduced the weight of each car by over 4,000 pounds, when compared to previous models.

== History ==
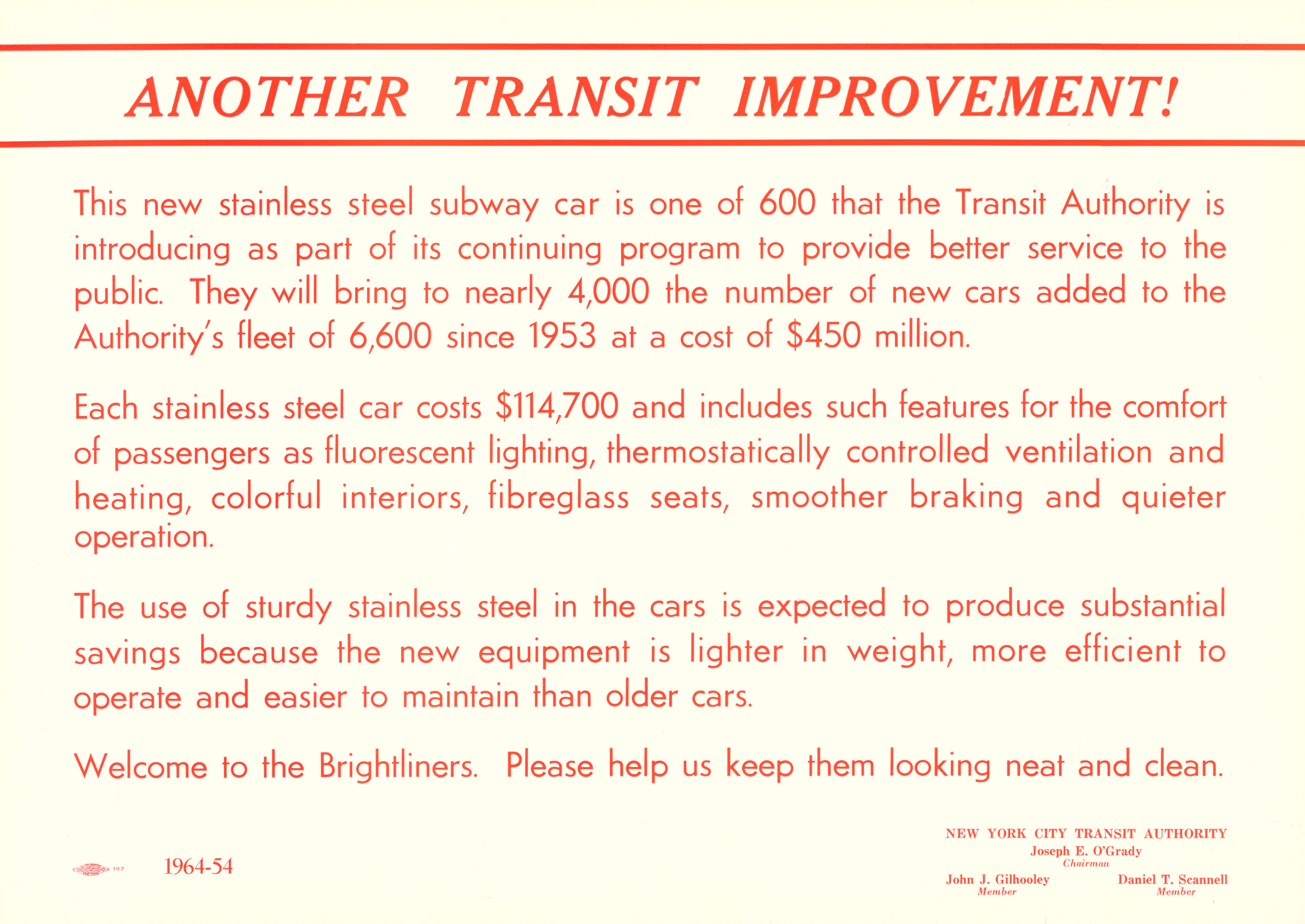
A poster from 1964 referencing the R32 order

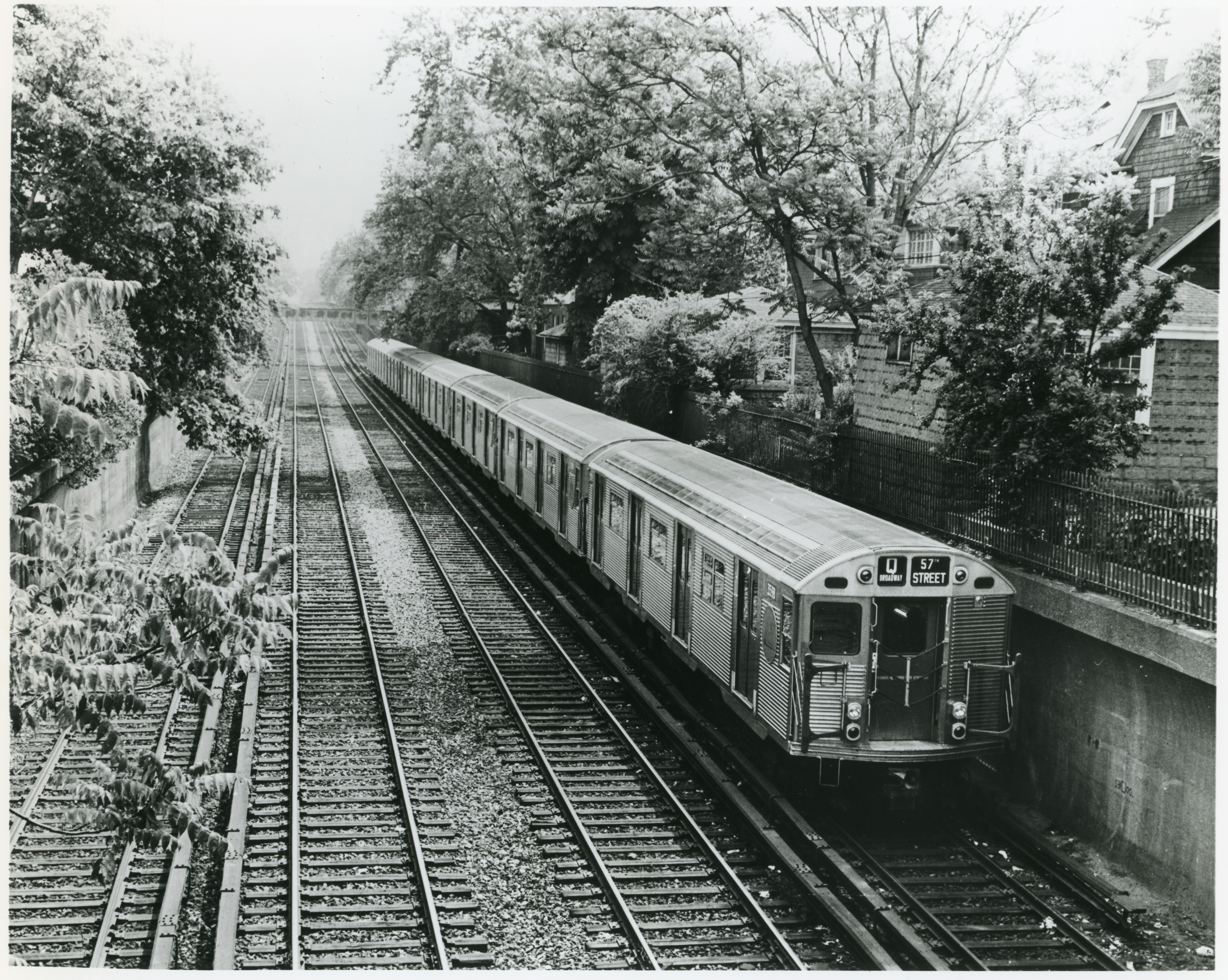
R32s in service on the Q in the 1960s

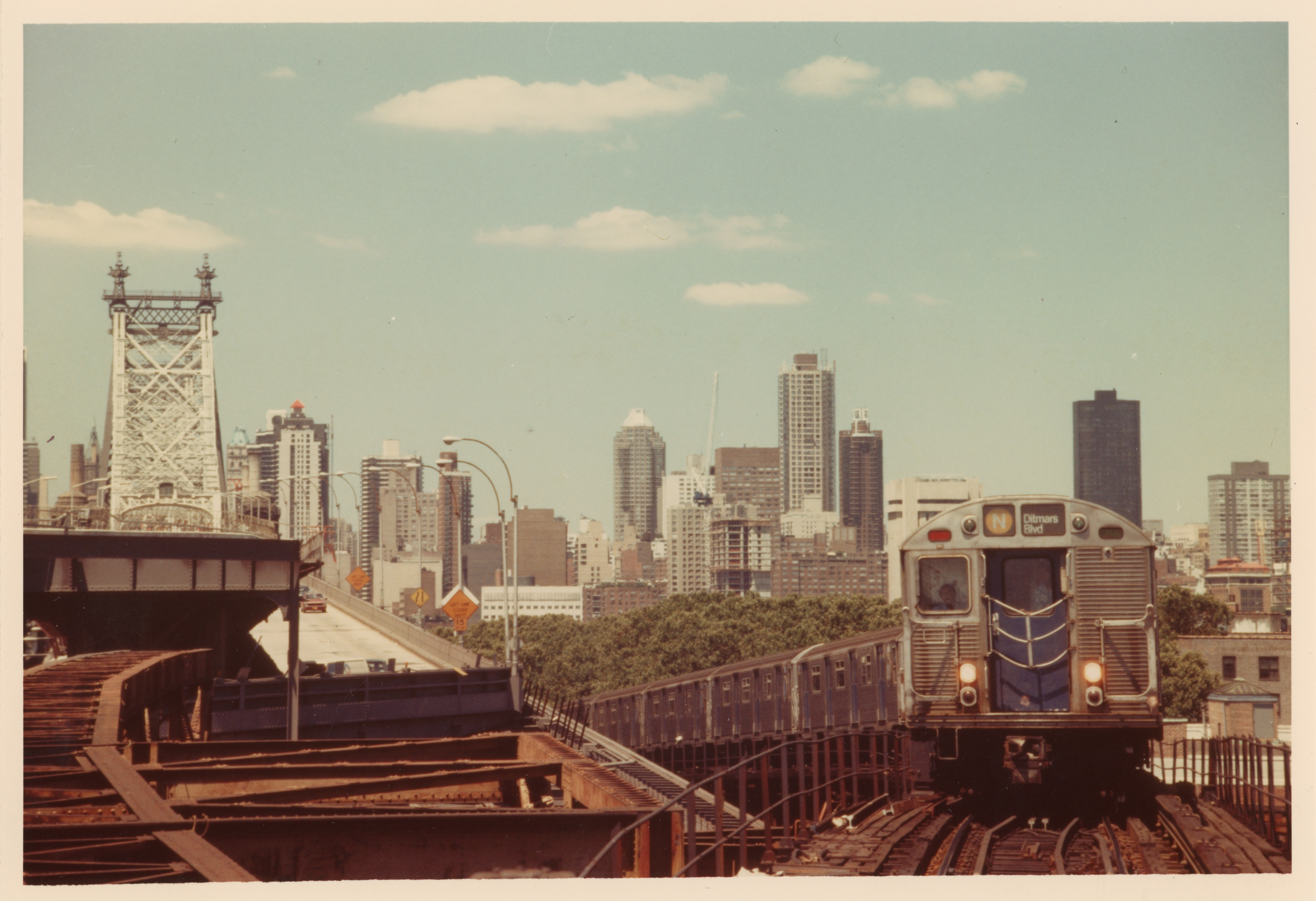
R32s in service on the N in the late 1980s

In June 1963, the New York City Transit Authority contracted with Budd for 600 IND/BMT cars (300 pairs) to replace older equipment (cars that had exceeded the TA's 35-year limit of age), including the BMT D-type Triplex articulated cars and some of the BMT Standards. At the time, this was the largest railcar order ever placed in the United States for subway cars.

The cars were ordered for $68,820,000, of which half was provided by New York City and half through the sale of bonds by the New York City Transit Authority. Budd had bid on previous contracts with the NYCTA, but had never won a City contract for a production run of cars until the R32s, as Budd built only stainless-steel equipment, and the TA refused to allow a differential in competitive bids for this higher-quality construction.

Budd won the contract by offering the lowest bid of $114,700 per car. The next lowest bidder came in at $117,900 per car, which was for low-alloy steel cars. Budd introduced stainless steel equipment to the modern New York City Subway system, a plan that was met with limited success. NYCTA allowed a premium for subsequent stainless steel contracts, and all subsequent equipment was at least partly constructed of stainless steel. However, the Budd Company never benefited from the change, as they failed to win further contracts from the NYCTA, and the company has since halted the production of railroad cars.

The R32 cars originally came with blue passenger doors and blue storm doors. The passenger doors of many cars were repainted silver from 1974, as the graffiti epidemic worsened. Some cars retained or regained blue passenger doors towards the start of the General Overhaul (GOH) program, which replaced all the doors with stainless steel versions.

On August 18, 1964, the NYCTA approved a modification to the 300 R32s already constructed. The modification was required to ensure proper clearance in tunnels. Since the cars were 4,000 pounds lighter than other subway cars when new, they did not sink as low on standard trucks and springs. The modification was to the body bolster.

A ceremonial introduction trip for the new R32 "Brightliners" cars was held on September 9, 1964, operating from the New York Central Railroad's Mott Haven Yards in the Bronx to Grand Central Terminal in Midtown Manhattan along the Park Avenue main line (presently operated by Metro-North Railroad). The new cars were then placed into service on the Q on September 14, 1964, after their New York Central's spring-loaded under-running third rail shoes were replaced with gravity-type overrunning subway third rail shoes. The R32s were originally assigned to the BMT Southern Division service only, initially on the Brighton Line (Q train) and the Sea Beach Line (N train), but were eventually reassigned to the West End Line (T and TT trains).

Cars 3946–3949 were delivered with Pioneer trucks and disc brakes in 1966. These trucks were replaced with standard trucks in 1976.

In 1974, cars 3700–3701 were sent to Garrett AiResearch's facilities in Los Angeles, California, to test out Flywheel energy storage system equipment. 3700 received energy conservation machinery with batteries and amber-type digital readout indicating the amount of energy used by the equipment, while 3701 remained unmodified. These cars were later tested at the UMTA, and the US Department of Transportation's Testing Facilities in Pueblo, Colorado, for evaluation, and were returned to the MTA in 1976 for in-service testing on all BMT/IND Lines to check the effectiveness of the technology.

=== Overhaul and mishaps ===
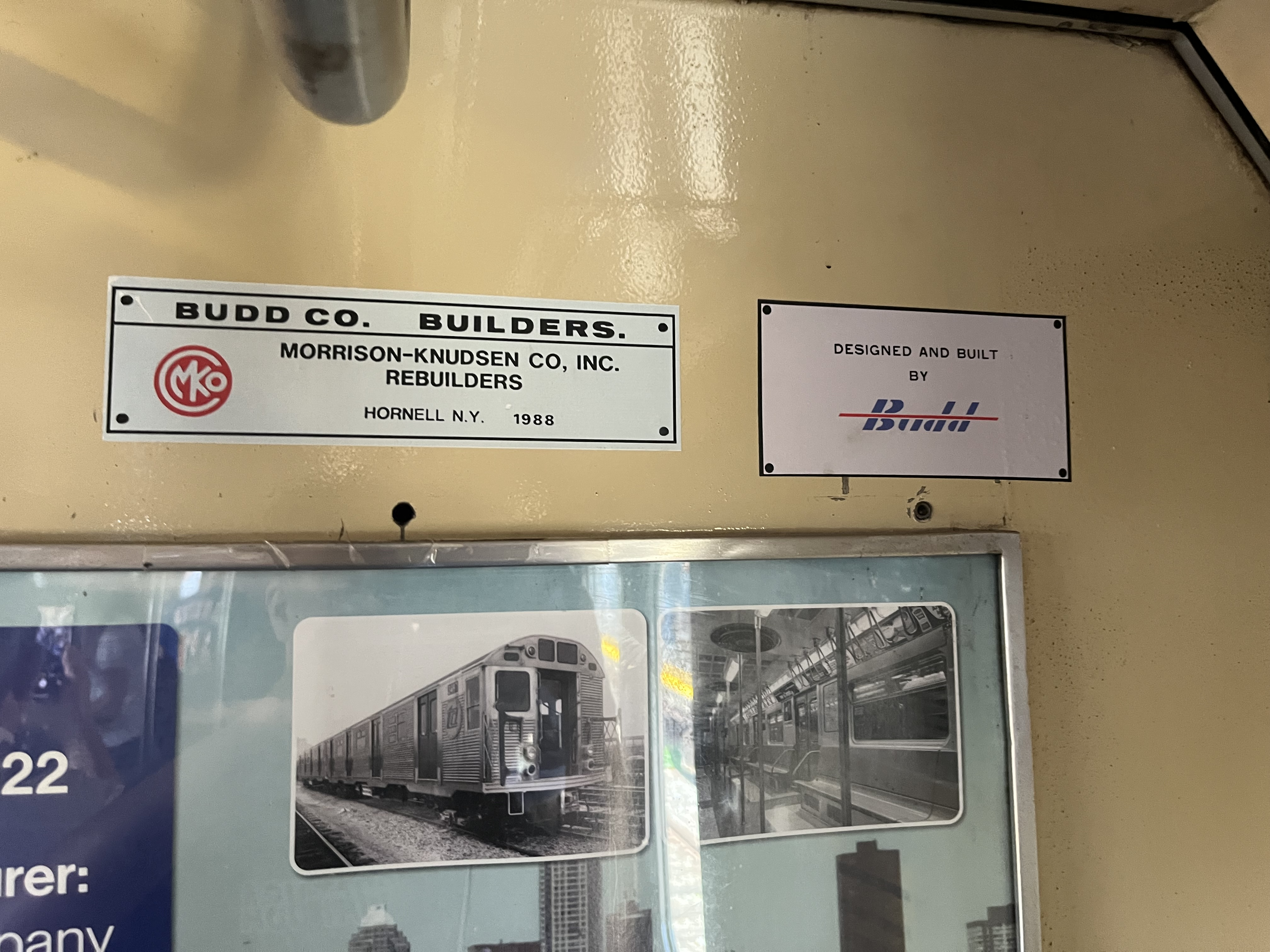
Replica builders and overhaul plate seen on car 3361

Cars 3616, 3629, 3651, and 3766 were scrapped due to collision damage sustained in various accidents in the 1970s and 1980s. Their mates were paired with other cars.

Car 3659 was rebuilt as an even-numbered car and renumbered to 3348 following the loss of its even-numbered mate in an accident. Car 3669 was retired following a derailment, so its even-numbered mate 3668 was rebuilt into an odd-numbered car and renumbered to 3669.

The R32s were rebuilt between 1986 and 1990 under the General Overhaul (GOH) program as a result of deferred maintenance in the transit system during the 1970s and 1980s. Ten cars were rebuilt off-property by General Electric at its facility in Buffalo, New York (cars 3594–3595, 3880–3881, 3892–3893, 3936–3937, and 3934–3935) as prototype rebuilds, with the car interiors resembling the rebuilt R38s. The remainder of the fleet was rebuilt by Morrison–Knudsen at its facility in Hornell, New York. Morrison–Knudsen was selected as the contractor in April 1986 to rebuild 290 cars (later amended to 296 cars) in the fleet; they would again be selected one year later to rebuild the remaining cars. All cars received air conditioning which necessitated the removal of the route and destination rollsign curtain mechanisms, as the air conditioning units made the location where the front signs are located inaccessible for train crew members to change manually; the rollsigns were replaced with electronic flipdot displays controlled from the crew member's cab that displays only the route. The distinctive "EXP" (express) and "LOCAL" marker lights were removed. By June 1990, all overhauled cars were in service.

After refurbishment, the R32 and R32A cars were renamed R32 Phase I, R32 Phase II, and R32 GE. The R32 Phase I cars (re-built by Morrison–Knudsen) had WABCO Air Brake packages, GE Master Controllers, and Thermo King HVAC units. The R32 Phase II cars (also re-built by Morrison–Knudsen) had NY Air Brake equipment, Westinghouse Master Controllers, and Stone Safety HVAC units. The ten prototype rebuild R32 GE cars differ from the Phase I and II cars as they were rebuilt to R38 specifications. They had experimental Sigma HVAC Units powered by A/C motors and solid state inverters, original traction motors rebuilt to 115 horsepower instead of the traditional 100 horsepower units, backlit ad signs, and different bulkhead designs. Since the cars were sent out to be overhauled based on how poorly they were performing (worst first), there were R32s and R32As rebuilt in both Phase I and Phase II configurations. There were about a dozen or more pairs that are composed of R32 and R32A mixes.

=== Retirement ===
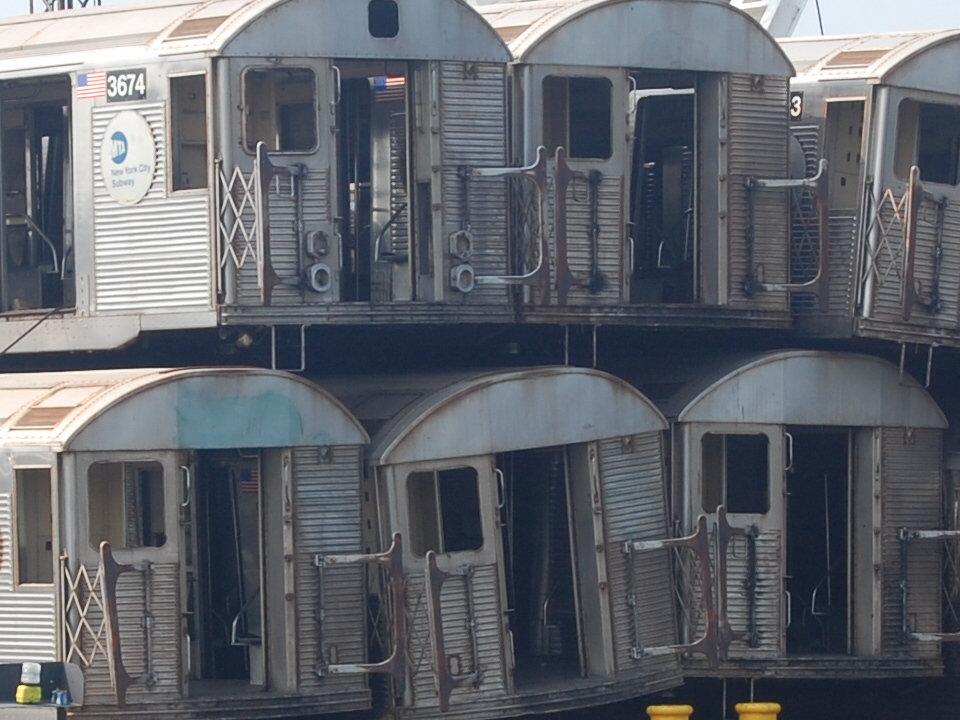
Many retired R32s waiting to be shipped out to the Atlantic Ocean for reefing

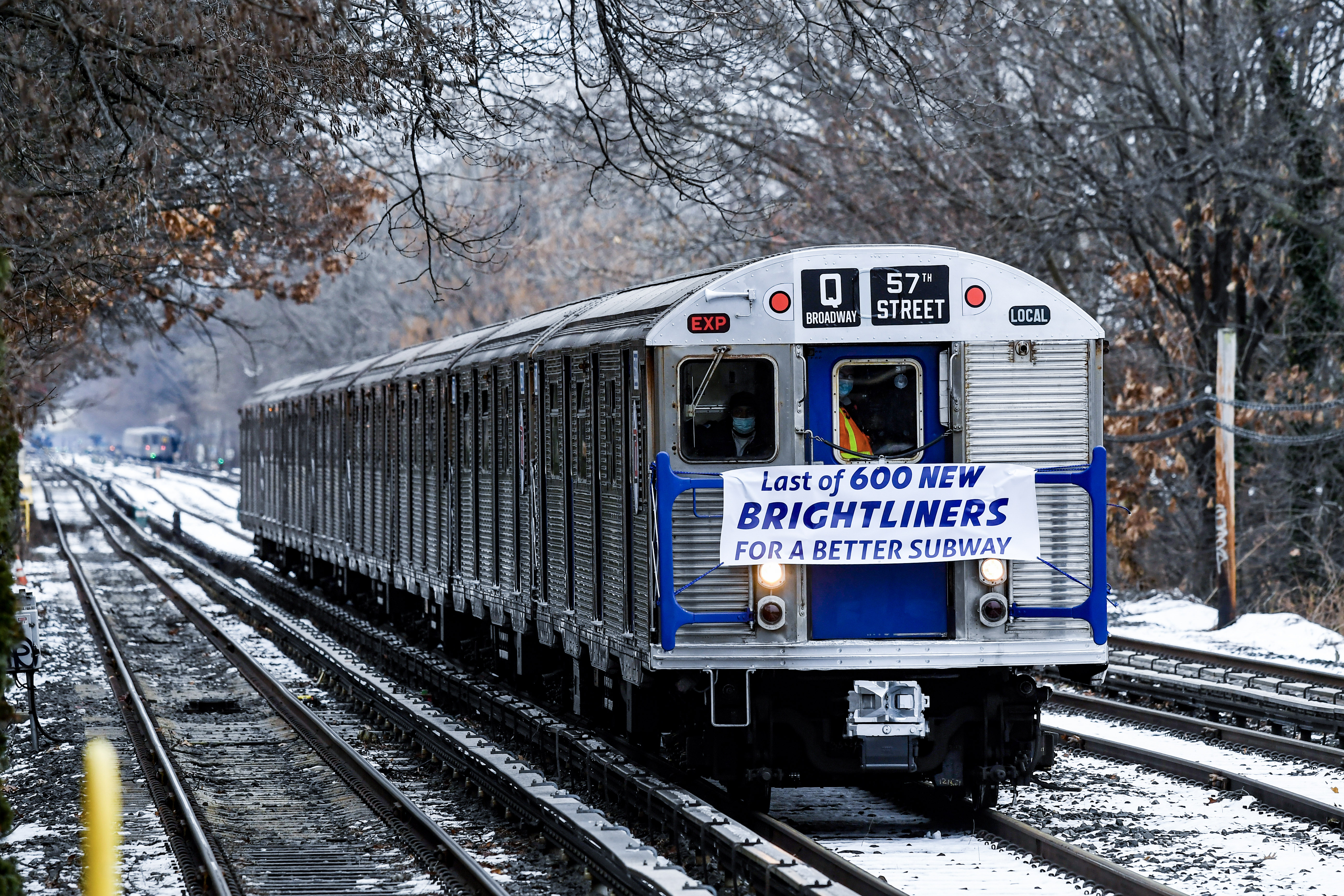
One of the final trips of the R32s, on January 9, 2022

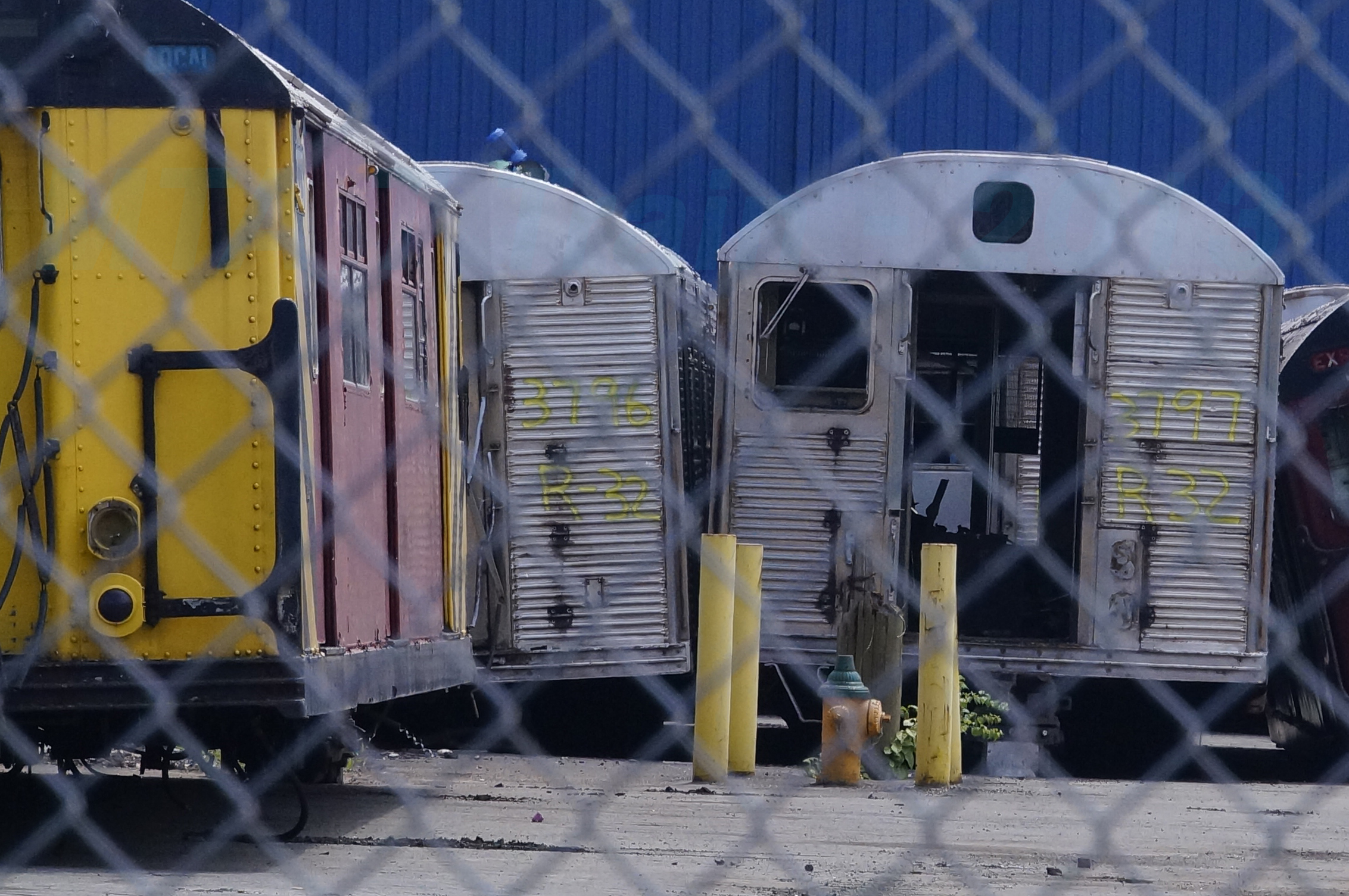
R32s and an R33S at the Sims Metal Management in Newark, New Jersey. These subway cars are awaiting to be scrapped.

In July 2002, the MTA awarded contracts to Alstom and Kawasaki for the delivery and purchase of new subway cars (the R160) in order to retire the R32s, as well as the other B Division 60-foot cars (R38s, R40s, and R42s). In December 2007, an arrangement was made with the Delaware Department of Natural Resources and Environmental Control to create artificial reefs with the R32s and other retired subway car models off of the coast of Cape Henlopen, Delaware, similar to how the A Division Redbirds were processed and reefed from 2001 to 2003.

The R32 fleet began being withdrawn from service in June 2007, with the first cars being reefed in March 2008. The General Electric-rebuilds were the first to be removed from passenger service amongst the fleet; the last four General Electric-rebuilds on the active roster (cars 3880–3881 and 3934–3935) made their last trip on the E on August 29, 2007. The Phase II-rebuilds were next to be removed from passenger service amongst the fleet after the General Electric-rebuilds starting in March 2008; the last two Phase II-rebuilds on the active roster (cars 3421 and 3558) made their last trip on the F on October 13, 2008. The Phase I-rebuilds were next to be removed from passenger service amongst the fleet after the Phase II-rebuilds starting in November 2008; however, on December 18, 2009, the MTA decided to move forward with retiring the New York City Transit R44s instead of the remaining R32s. As a result, 252 Phase I-rebuilds (246 of which were available for active service) were retained when the MTA decided to place a hold on retiring any 60-foot cars. By December 2010, only 232 active cars remained, 222 of which were assigned to 207th Street Yard, operating on the A and C. These had periodically undergone intermittent SMS (Scheduled Maintenance Service, a life-extension program) cycles – at a cost of $25 million – to extend their useful lives.

In March 2012, the MTA awarded a contract to Bombardier for the delivery and purchase of new subway cars (the R179) in order to retire the remaining R32s and R42s. The R32s were originally slated for retirement in 2017, but the R179s experienced delays in delivery. Subsequently, plans were changed to retain the R32s in order for them to provide a backup fleet and support service increased frequencies until in 2022, when they would finally be replaced by the R211s. By January 2020, it was again decided to retire the R32s with the R179s.

With the R179 delivery completed, the R32s were gradually phased out until the last train made its final trip on the C on March 26, 2020. In June 2020, some R32s were reactivated and transferred to East New York Yard to provide backup revenue service due to the R179s being pulled from service. The R32s re-entered service on the J and Z on July 1, 2020 until being withdrawn again on October 8, 2020.

After a year in storage, the R32s were officially retired when the last train made final runs in December 2021 and January 2022 as part of a series of farewell trips organized by the New York Transit Museum on four consecutive Sundays. On December 19 and 26, 2021, and January 2, 2022, the train ran along the D and F routes between 145th Street and Second Avenue. On January 9, 2022, the train ran along the Q between 96th Street and Brighton Beach, making express stops.

Most cars retired by the R160s were stripped and sunk as artificial reefs. After the reefing program ended in April 2010, cars retired by the R160s were trucked to Sims Metal Management's Newark facility to be scrapped. The scrapping and processing of these cars occurred between April 2013 and October 2013.

Between February 2022 and mid-2023, cars retired by the R179s were towed through the South Brooklyn Railway, New York New Jersey Rail, and the Brooklyn Army Terminal before being partially disassembled for shipment to Frontier Industrial Corp in Ohio to be scrapped. Since late 2023, cars retired by the R179s are being towed through the South Brooklyn Railway, New York New Jersey Rail, and the Brooklyn Army Terminal before being further towed to Sims Metal Management's Jersey City facility to be scrapped.

A handful of R32 cars were saved for various purposes, as following:

- Phase II pair 3350–3351 – set aside for preservation by the Railway Preservation Corp. This pair was the second pair on the R32s' premiere trip on September 9, 1964; they were restored to operational status in 2025.
- Phase II pair 3352–3353 – set aside for preservation by the New York Transit Museum. This pair was the lead pair on the R32s' premiere trip on September 9, 1964.
- Phase I pairs 3354–3355, 3646–3647, 3888–3889, 3894–3895, 3938–3939 – retained for excursion trips and film-making use.
- Phase I pair 3360–3361 – set aside for preservation by the New York Transit Museum. This pair was part of not only the R32s' final trip on January 9, 2022, but also the R32s' premiere trip on September 9, 1964, giving it a life of over 57 years. The car received paint and decals to replicate its original appearance.
- Phase I car 3388 – converted to a maintenance of way car for the Staten Island Railway. It will be capable of de-icing, rail adhesion, and rerailing trains.
- Phase I car 3389 – converted to a maintenance of way car for the Staten Island Railway. It was retrofitted with high-powered lasers to incinerate leaf residue.
- Phase I pair 3432–3433 – preserved by the Craggy Mountain Line in Asheville, North Carolina.
- GE-rebuilt pair 3594–3595 – being used as NYPD training cars at Floyd Bennett Field.
- Phase I car 3698 – purchased by a private owner in Florida.
- Phase I car 3912 – sent to the New Jersey Office of Emergency Management (NJOEM) in West Trenton, NJ in 2024.

Ten cars taken out of revenue service on December 12, 2010 were used for work service, handling such tasks as providing traction for B Division rail adhesion cars and refuse collection trains. They had a "1" placed in front of their numbers like some other work service cars. They were eventually scrapped and replaced by fifty R42 cars between 2020 and 2022.

== Longevity ==
The longest-lasting R32s were in service for almost 58 years, currently the longest such service life in New York City rapid transit operations. They were the last cars built for the New York City Transit Authority – prior to its merger with the Metropolitan Transportation Authority in 1968 – to remain in service. The R32s had survived well past their specified service life of 35 years. They are the oldest rolling stock since the retirement of the Redbird trains, and the oldest rolling stock of any metro system in North America, as well as some of the oldest rolling stock of any metro system anywhere in the world. (Note: At the time of final withdrawal (January 9, 2022), older fleets in active service included: The Eidan 500 Series, which ran on the Tokyo Metro Marunouchi Line from 1954 to 1995, and have run on Line B of the Buenos Aires Underground since 1996; they are scheduled to be retired in the mid-2020s.; The MP 59 from 1963, which ran on Line 11 of the Paris Metro until 2024.; The Class D, which ran on the Berlin U-Bahn from 1957 to 2004, and on the Pyongyang Metro since 1998. In Berlin, a shortage of rolling stock caused by growing passenger demand, and the urgent withdrawal of the Class F79 fleet due to irreparable structural issues, resulted in two Class Ds temporarily returning to service on Line U55 from 2017 to 2020.) The R32s outlasted the newer R38s, R40s, R42s, and New York City Transit R44s.

Despite their considerable structural quality, the R32s suffered from low mechanical reliability near the end of their service lives. They had the lowest Mean Distance Between Failures figures of the active fleet, as the overhauls they received during the 1988–89 period wore out after 29–30 years. Others criticized the R32s for their appearance and lack of comfort. In August 2011, The New York Times called the R32s "a dreary reminder to passengers of an earlier subterranean era", and claimed that "time has taken a toll" on the cars. The cars had worn-out air conditioning, propulsion, and braking systems, so they were often temporarily transferred to services with mostly outdoor or elevated portions, namely the A, J, and Z.

== In popular culture ==
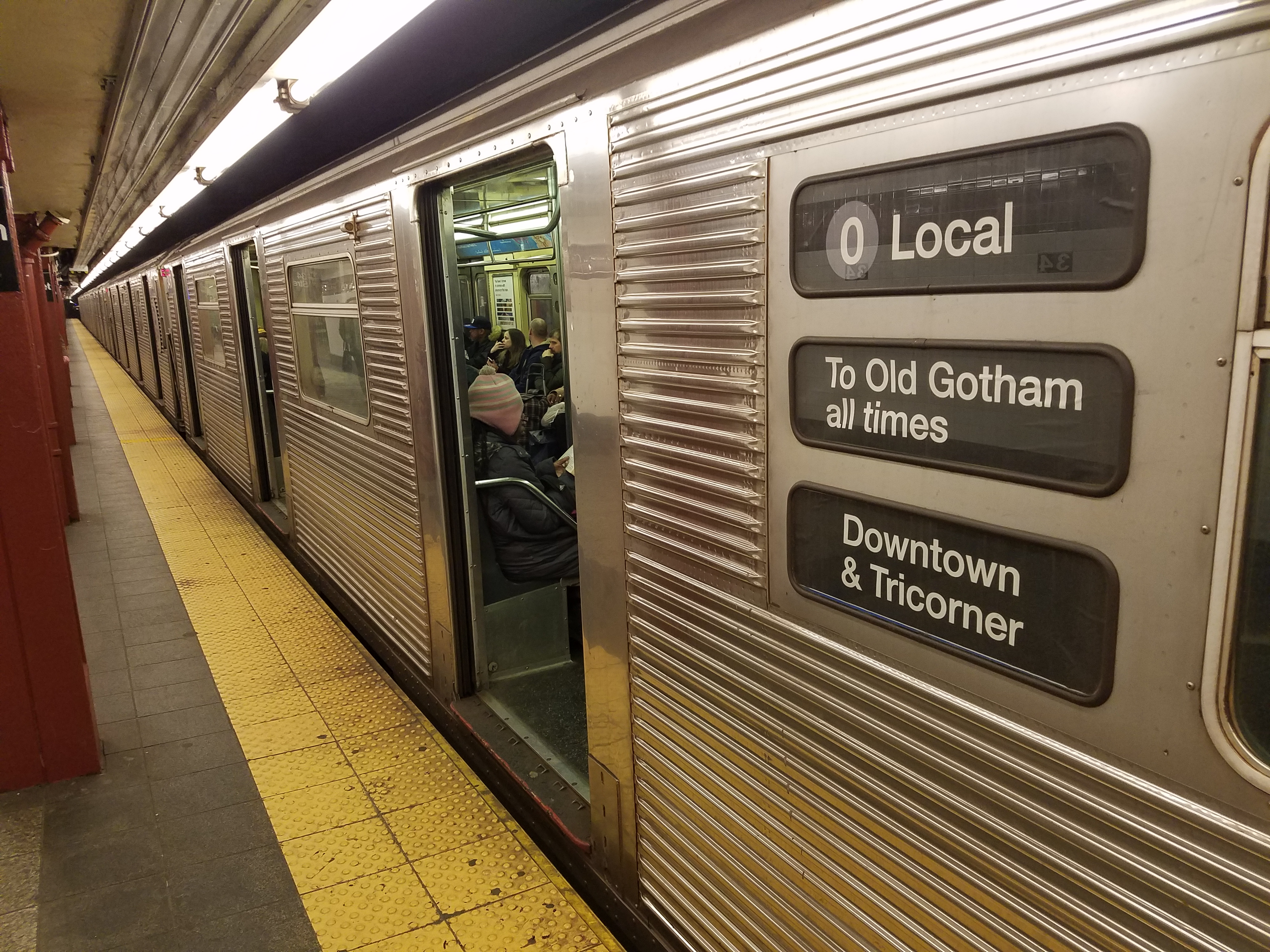
An R32 C train with a rollsign for the fictional 0 service leftover from filming for Joker

In the famous car chase scene in the film The French Connection, the chased train of R42s crashes into an R32.

An R32 is featured in Men in Black II, featuring an alien entering a tunnel. Once there, it attacks and devours most of a subway train (which is a combination of R32 and R38 cars) until Agent J destroys it. He is then seen walking out of the station, 81st Street–Museum of Natural History.

An R32 is featured in Inside Llewyn Davis, but the train is historically inaccurate.

A train of R32s was featured in the 2015 film Bridge of Spies, although the film is set a decade prior to their manufacturing. Interior shots were filmed in the New York Transit Museum.

Several trains of R32s were featured in the movie Spider-Man: Homecoming, on the J train.

An R32 is featured at Church Avenue, 18th Avenue, and Bedford Park Boulevard stations for the movie Joker.

An R32 is featured in the second season of Russian Doll.

An R32 is featured in the film Past Lives.

An R32 running as a D train is featured on the cover of the album Transportation by Your Old Droog.
