= Compulsory sterilization =

Sterilization effected by government coercion

Compulsory sterilization, also known as forced or coerced sterilization, refers to any government-mandated program to involuntarily sterilize a specific group of people. Sterilization removes a person's capacity to reproduce and is usually done by surgical or chemical means.

Purported justifications for compulsory sterilization have included population control, eugenics, limiting the spread of HIV, and ethnic genocide.

Forced sterilization can also occur as a form of racial discrimination. While not always mandated by law (de jure), there are cases where forced sterilization has occurred in practice (de facto). This distinction highlights the difference between official policies and actual implementation, where coerced sterilization takes place even without explicit legal authorization.

Several countries implemented sterilization programs in the early 20th century. Although such programs have been made illegal in much of the world, instances of forced or coerced sterilizations persist.

== Affected populations ==
Governmental family-planning programs emerged in the late 19th century and have continued to progress through the 21st century. During this time, as feminists began advocating for reproductive choice, eugenicists and hygienists were advocating for low-income and disabled people to be sterilized or have their fertility tightly regulated in order to "clean" or "perfect" nations. The second half of the 20th century saw national governments' uptake of neo-Malthusian ideology that directly linked population growth to increased (and uncontrollable) poverty, which, during the embrace of capitalism, meant that countries were unable to economically develop due to this poverty.

Many of these governmental population control programs were focused on using sterilization as the main avenue to reduce high birth rates, even though public acknowledgement that sterilization made an impact on the population levels of the developing world is still widely lacking. Early population programs of the 20th century were marked as part of the eugenics movement, with Nazi Germany's programs providing the most well-known examples of sterilization of disabled people. In the 1970s, population control programs focused on the "third world" to help curtail overpopulation of poverty areas that were beginning to "develop" (Duden 1992).

As of 2013, 24 countries in Europe required sterilization for legal gender recognition, and 16 countries did not provide for any possibility to change legal gender at all, which meant that transgender people could have challenges applying for jobs, boarding planes, or opening bank accounts. Disabled women in Europe are also common targets of forced sterilization. "'So many times, you hear it's in the best interest of the woman,' said Catalina Devandas Aguilar, a former United Nations special rapporteur for disability rights. 'But often, it's because it's more convenient for the family or the institution that takes care of them.'"

On 1 February 2013, the United Nations Special Rapporteur on Torture (SRT) issued a report on abusive practices in health care settings that has important implications for LGBT people and people with intersex conditions. In section 88, the SRT says states should:

Repeal any law allowing intrusive and irreversible treatments, including forced genital-normalizing surgery, involuntary sterilization, unethical experimentation, medical display, "reparative therapies," or "conversion therapies," when enforced or administered without the free and informed consent of the person concerned. He also calls upon them to outlaw forced or coerced sterilization in all circumstances and provide special protection to individuals belonging to marginalized groups.

In May 2014, the World Health Organization, OHCHR, UN Women, UNAIDS, UNDP, UNFPA, and UNICEF issued a joint statement on "Eliminating forced, coercive, and otherwise involuntary sterilization." The report references the involuntary sterilization of several specific population groups. They include:

- Women, especially in relation to coercive population control policies, and particularly including women living with HIV and indigenous and ethnic minority girls and women. Indigenous and ethnic minority women often face "wrongful stereotyping based on gender, race, and ethnicity."
  - In the United States, the funding of mothers on welfare by HEW (Health, Education, and Welfare) covers roughly 90% of the cost, and doctors are likely to concur with the compulsory sterilization of mothers on welfare. Threats to cease welfare occur when women are hesitant to consent.
- Disabled people, especially those with intellectual disabilities. Women with intellectual disabilities are often treated as if they have no control, or should have no control, over their sexual and reproductive choices. Other rationales include menstrual management for women who have or are perceived to have difficulties coping with or managing menses, or whose health conditions (such as epilepsy) or behaviour are negatively affected by menses. Men with intellectual disabilities are also sterilized, sometimes using the justification that it provides greater sexual freedom.
- Intersex persons, who are often subjected to cosmetic and other non-medically indicated surgeries performed on their reproductive organs, without their informed consent or that of their parents, and without taking into consideration the views of the children involved, often as a "sex-normalizing" treatment.
- Transgender persons, "as a prerequisite to receiving gender-affirmative treatment and gender marker changes." This being a practice that the United Nations Special Rapporteur on torture and other cruel, inhuman or degrading treatment, or punishment has described as a violation of the Yogyakarta Principles.

The report recommends a range of guiding principles for medical treatment, including ensuring patient autonomy in decision-making, non-discrimination, accountability, and access to remedies. Scholars have also emphasized the importance of including the voices and stories of those who have been affected.

== As a part of human population planning ==
Human population planning is the practice of artificially altering the rate of growth of a human population. Historically, human population planning has been implemented by limiting the population's birth rate, usually by government mandate, and has been undertaken as a response to factors including high or increasing levels of poverty, environmental concerns, religious reasons, and overpopulation. While population planning can involve measures that improve people's lives by giving them greater control of their reproduction, some programs have exposed them to exploitation.

In the 1977 textbook Ecoscience: Population, Resources, Environment, authors Paul and Anne Ehrlich and John Holdren discuss a variety of means to address human overpopulation, including the possibility of compulsory sterilization. This book received renewed media attention with the appointment of Holdren as Assistant to the President for Science and Technology, Director of the White House Office of Science and Technology Policy, largely from conservative pundits who have published scans of the textbook online. Several forms of compulsory sterilization are mentioned, including the proposal for vasectomies for men with three or more children in India in the 1960s, sterilizing women after the birth of their second or third child; birth control implants as a form of removable, long-term sterilization; a licensing system allotting a certain number of children per woman, economic and quota systems of having a certain number of children, and adding a sterilant to drinking water or food sources, although the authors are clear that no such sterilant exists nor is one in development. The authors state that most of these policies are not in practice, have not been tried, and most will likely "remain unacceptable to most societies."

Holdren stated in his confirmation hearing that he no longer supports the creation of an optimum population by the U.S. government. However, the population control policies suggested in the book are indicative of the concerns about overpopulation, also discussed in The Population Bomb, a book written by Paul R. Ehrlich and Anne Ehrlich predicting major societal upheavals due to overpopulation. As this concern about overpopulation gained political, economic, and social currency, attempts to reduce fertility rates, often through compulsory sterilization, were a result of this drive to reduce overpopulation. These coercive and abusive population control policies impacted people around the world in different ways and continue to have social, health, and political consequences, one of which is lasting mistrust in current family planning initiatives by populations who were subjected to coercive policies like forced sterilization. Population control policies were widely critiqued by the women's health movement in the 1980s and 1990s, with the International Conference on Population and Development in 1994 in Cairo initiating a shift from population control to reproductive rights and the contemporary reproductive justice movement. However, new forms of population control policies, including coercive sterilization practices, are a global issue and a reproductive rights and justice issue.

== By country ==
Forced sterilization of people with disabilities in Europe: Forced sterilization is allowed for minors. Forced sterilization is allowed. Forced sterilization is prohibited. No data

=== International law ===
The Istanbul Convention prohibits forced sterilization in most European countries (Article 39). Widespread or systematic forced sterilization has been recognized as a crime against humanity by the Rome Statute of the International Criminal Court in the explanatory memorandum. This memorandum defines the jurisdiction of the International Criminal Court. It does not have universal jurisdiction, with the United States, Russia, and China among the countries to exclude themselves. Rebecca Lee wrote in the Berkeley Journal of International Law that, as of 2015, twenty-one Council of Europe member states require proof of sterilization to change one's legal sex categorization. Lee wrote that requiring sterilization is a human rights violation and that LGBTQ-specific international treaties may need to be developed to protect LGBTQ human rights.

=== Bangladesh ===
==== Poverty ====
Bangladesh has the highest population density among countries with a population of at least 10 million people. The capital, Dhaka, is the fourth most densely populated city in the world and was ranked as the world's second most unlivable city in 2015 according to the annual "Liveability Ranking" by the Economist Intelligence Unit.

Bangladesh has a long-running government-operated civilian sterilization program as a part of its population control policy, which aims at women and men living in poverty. The government offers 2,000 Bangladeshi taka (US$16) for women who are persuaded to undergo tubal ligation and for men who are persuaded to undergo vasectomy. Women are also offered a sari, and men are offered a kurta to wear for undergoing sterilization. The referrer, who persuades the woman or man to undergo sterilization, gets 300 Bangladeshi taka (US$2.70).

In 1965, the targeted number of sterilizations per month was 600–1,000, in contrast to the insertion of 25,000 IUDs, which was increased in 1978 to about 50,000 sterilizations per month on average. A 50% rise in the amount paid to men coincided with a doubling of the number of vasectomies between 1980 and 1981.

One study conducted in 1977, when incentives were only equivalent to US$1.10 (at that time), indicated that between 40% and 60% of the men chose vasectomy because of the payment, who otherwise did not have any serious urge to get sterilized.

The "Bangladesh Association for Voluntary Sterilization" alone performed 67,000 tubal ligations and vasectomies in its 25 clinics in 1982. The sterilization rate increased 25 percent each year.

On 16 December 1982, Bangladesh's military ruler Lieutenant General Hussain Muhammad Ershad launched a two-year mass sterilization program for Bangladeshi women and men. About 3,000 women and men were planned to be sterilized on 16 December 1982 (the opening day). Ershad's government trained 1,200 doctors and 25,000 field workers who must conduct two tubal ligations and two vasectomies each month to earn their salaries. The government wanted to persuade 1.4 million people, both women and men, to undergo sterilization within two years. By January 1983, 40,000 government field workers were employed in Bangladesh's 65,000 villages to persuade women and men to undergo sterilization and to promote usage of birth control across the country.

Food subsidies under the group feeding program (VGF) were given to only those women with certificates showing that they had undergone tubal ligation.

There are reports that often when a woman had to undergo a gastrointestinal surgery, doctors took this opportunity to sterilize her without her knowledge. According to Bangladesh's governmental website "National Emergency Service", the 2000 Bangladeshi taka (US$24) and the sari/lungi given to the persons undergoing sterilizations are their "compensations". The Bangladesh government also assures the poor people that it will cover all medical expenses if complications arise after the sterilization.

For women who are persuaded to have an IUD inserted into their uterus, the government also offers 150 Bangladeshi taka (US$1.80) after the procedure and 240 Bangladeshi taka (US$2.88) in three follow-ups, where the referrer gets 50 Bangladeshi taka (US$0.60). For the women who are persuaded to have an etonogestrel birth control implant placed under the skin in their upper arm, the government offers 150 Bangladeshi taka (US$1.80) after the procedure and 210 Bangladeshi taka (US$2.52) in three follow-ups, where the referrer gets 60 Bangladeshi taka (US$0.72).

===== Complications =====
In the 1977 study, a one-year follow-up of 585 men sterilized at vasectomy camps in Shibpur and Shalna in rural Bangladesh showed that almost half of the men were dissatisfied with their vasectomies.

58% of the men said their ability to work had decreased in the last year. 2–7% of the men said their sexual performance decreased. 30.6% of the Shibpur and 18.9% of the Shalna men experienced severe pain during the vasectomy. The men also said they had not received all of the incentives they had been promised.

According to another study on 5,042 women and 264 men who underwent sterilization, complications such as painful urination, shaking chills, fever for at least two days, frequent urination, bleeding from the incision, sores with pus, stitches or skin breaking open, weakness, and dizziness arose after the sterilization.

The person's sex, the sponsor and workload in the sterilization center, and the dose of sedatives administered to women were significantly associated with specific postoperative complaints. Five women died during the study, resulting in a death-to-case rate of 9.9/10,000 tubectomies (tubal ligations); four deaths were due to respiratory arrest caused by overuse of sedatives. The death-to-case rate of 9.9/10,000 tubectomies (tubal ligation) in this study is similar to the 10.0 deaths/10,000 cases estimated on the basis of a 1979 follow-up study in an Indian female sterilization camp. The presence of a complaint before the operation was generally a good predictor of postoperative complaints. Centers performing fewer than 200 procedures were associated with more complaints.

According to another study based on 20 sterilization-attributable deaths in the Dacca (now Dhaka) and Rajshahi Divisions in Bangladesh, from 1 January 1979, to 31 March 1980, overall, the sterilization-attributable death-to-case rate was 21.3 deaths/100,000 sterilizations. The death rate for vasectomy was 1.6 times higher than that for tubal ligation. Anesthesia overdosage was the leading cause of death following tubal ligation, along with tetanus (24%), whereas intraperitoneal hemorrhage (14%) and infection other than tetanus (5%) were other leading causes of death.

Two women (10%) died from pulmonary embolism after tubal ligation; one (5%) died from each of the following: anaphylaxis from anti-tetanus serum, heat stroke, small bowel obstruction, and aspiration of vomitus. All seven men died from scrotal infections after vasectomy.

According to a second epidemiologic investigation of deaths attributable to sterilization in Bangladesh, where all deaths resulting from sterilizations performed nationwide between 16 September 1980 and 15 April 1981 were investigated and analyzed, nineteen deaths from tubal ligation were attributed to 153,032 sterilizations (both tubal ligation and vasectomy), for an overall death-to-case rate of 12.4 deaths per 100,000 sterilizations. This rate was lower than that (21.3) for sterilizations performed in Dacca (now Dhaka) and Rajshahi Divisions from 1 January 1979 to 31 March 1980, although this difference was not statistically significant. Anesthesia overdosage, tetanus, and hemorrhage (bleeding) were the leading causes of death.

==== Rohingya ====
Bangladesh is planning to introduce a sterilization program in its overcrowded Rohingya refugee camps, where nearly a million refugees are fighting for space, after efforts to encourage birth control failed. Since 25 August 2017, more than 600,000 Rohingya Muslims have fled from Rakhine state, Myanmar, to neighboring Bangladesh, which is a Muslim-majority country, following a military crackdown against Rohingya Muslims in Rakhine. Sabura, a Rohingya mother of seven, said her husband believed the couple could support a large family.

I spoke to my husband about birth control measures. But he is not convinced. He was given two condoms, but he did not use them. My husband said we need more children, as we have land and property (in Rakhine). We don't have to worry about feeding them.

District family planning authorities have managed to distribute just 549 packets of condoms among the refugees, amid reports that they are reluctant to use them. They have asked the government to approve a plan to provide vasectomies for men and tubectomies (tubal ligation) for women in the camps.

One volunteer, Farhana Sultana, said the women she spoke to believed birth control was a sin, and others saw it as against the tenets of Islam.

Bangladeshi officials say about 20,000 Rohingya refugee women are pregnant and 600 have given birth since arriving in the country, but this may not be accurate, as many births take place without formal medical help.

Every month, 250 Bangladeshis undergo sterilization routinely under the government's sterilization program in the border district of Cox's Bazar, where the Rohingya refugee Muslims have taken shelter.

=== Brazil ===
During the 1970s–80s, the U.S. government sponsored family planning campaigns in Brazil, although sterilization was illegal at the time there. Dalsgaard examined sterilization practices in Brazil, analyzing the choices of women who opt for this type of reproductive healthcare to prevent future pregnancies and so they can accurately plan their families. While many women choose this form of contraception, many societal factors impact this decision, such as poor economic circumstances, low rates of employment, and Catholic religious mandates that stipulate sterilization as less harmful than abortion.

An important case in the legal history of compulsory sterilization in Brazil is the 2018 São Paulo case. Prosecutors filed to have a mother of eight forcibly sterilized after she was arrested on charges of drug trafficking. This motion was justified by the mother's poverty, substance abuse disorder, and inability to care for her children, and the judge ruled in favor of sterilization. The surgery was carried out, reportedly against the woman's will. Legal experts discussing the case have stated the sterilization of a woman in Brazil is legal when determined absolutely necessary, but it is not clear what qualifies as necessary.

=== Canada ===
Compulsory sterilization in Canada of individuals deemed mentally unfit or "socially inadequate" was widespread in the early to mid-20th century. Laws based on the principles of eugenics led to the compulsory sterilization of thousands of individuals, many of whom were Indigenous women, persons with disabilities and intersex individuals.

The legal basis for compulsory sterilization in Canada can be traced back to the passage of the Sexual Sterilization Act in Alberta in 1928. This legislation allowed for the sterilization of mental hospital inmates to prevent the transmission of disability, resulting in 2,800 sterilizations prior to its repeal in 1972. Similar legislation existed in British Columbia from 1933 to 1973, affecting an estimated 200-400 people.

Allegations of both physically forced sterilization and coerced sterilization, with procedures either not explained or presented as 'reversible', have been reported. In 2019, an investigation by the Standing Committee on Human Rights in Canada was opened into the compulsory sterilization of Canadians. The paired reports, released in 2021 and 2022, concluded that the compulsory sterilization was ongoing in Canada, highlighting a risk to indigenous, disabled and racialized women, in addition to institutionalized persons and intersex children.

=== China ===
In 1978, Chinese authorities became concerned with the possibility of a baby boom that the country could not handle, and they initiated the one-child policy. To effectively deal with the complex issues surrounding childbirth, the Chinese government placed great emphasis on family planning. Because this was such an important matter, the government thought it needed to be standardized, and so to this end, laws were introduced in 2002. These laws uphold the basic tenets of what was previously put into practice, outlining the rights of individuals and how policy can be enforced.

However, accusations have been raised from groups such as Amnesty International, who have claimed that practices of compulsory sterilization have been occurring for people who have already reached their one-child quota. These practices run contrary to the stated principles of the law and seem to differ on a local level.

The Chinese government appears to be aware of these discrepancies in policy implementation at the local level. For example, the National Population and Family Planning Commission stated that "some persons concerned in a few counties and townships of Linyi did commit practices that violated the law and infringed upon legitimate rights and interests of citizens while conducting family planning work." This statement comes in reference to some charges of forced sterilization and abortions in Linyi City of Shandong Province.

The policy requires a "social compensation fee" for those who have more than the legal number of children. According to Forbes editor Heng Shao, critics claim this fee is a toll on the poor but not the rich. But after 2016, the country has allowed parents to give birth to two children. In 2017, the government offered to surgically remove the implanted IUDs if they were qualified to have a second child. The removal of these long-used IUDs is a major surgery, and many women are not informed of the risks associated with the surgery, such as bleeding, infection, and removal of the uterus.

==== Xinjiang ====
Beginning in 2019, reports of forced sterilization in Xinjiang began to surface. In 2020, public reporting continued to indicate that large-scale compulsory sterilization was being carried out. While national sterilization rates have fallen since the passing of the two-child policy in 2016, there has been a sharp increase in the amount of sterilizations in Xinjiang. Many of these surgeries have been forced, according to reports, but this is difficult to confirm due to the closed-off nature of the area. These measures have sometimes been characterised as part of an ongoing Uyghur genocide in the province.

=== Czechoslovakia and the Czech Republic ===
Czechoslovakia carried out a policy to sterilize Romani women, starting in 1973 and continuing through the Velvet Revolution of 1989. In some cases, the sterilization was in exchange for social welfare benefits, and the people who were affected were given written agreements that described what was to be done to them but which they were unable to read due to their illiteracy. The dissidents of the Charter 77 movement denounced these practices in 1977–78 as a genocide. A 2005 report by the Czech government's independent ombudsman, Otakar Motejl, identified dozens of cases of coercive sterilization between 1979 and 2001 and called for criminal investigations and possible prosecution against several healthcare workers and administrators.

Beginning in 2012, undergoing sterilization is a requirement for a change of name and/or gender markers on official documents for all transgender people in Czechia. In May 2024, the constitutional court found the laws requiring sterilization to violate EU human rights laws. The court set June 2025 as the deadline for the current government to draft replacement laws.

=== Colombia ===
The period 1964–1970 started Colombia's population policy development, including the founding of PROFAMILIA. Through the Ministry of Health, the family planning program promoted the use of IUDs, the Pill, and sterilization as the main avenues for contraception. By 2005, Colombia had one of the world's highest contraceptive usage rates at 76.9%, with female sterilization being the highest percentage of use at just over 30% (the second highest is the IUD at around 12% and the pill around 10%) (Measham and Lopez-Escobar 2007). In Colombia during the 1980s, sterilization was the second most popular choice of pregnancy prevention (after the Pill), and public healthcare organizations and funders (USAID, AVSC, IPPF) supported sterilization as a way to decrease abortion rates. While not directly forced into sterilization, women of lower socio-economic standing had significantly fewer options to afford family planning care, as sterilizations were subsidized.

=== Denmark ===
11,000 people were sterilized in Denmark from 1929 to 1967, about half of them against their will. The forced sterilization program was "[mainly] directed at people who were mentally handicapped" because of the popularity of eugenics at the time in Denmark. During the 1960s and 1970s, thousands of Greenlandic Inuit women and girls had IUDs placed without their consent. The birth rate in Greenland was reduced by around 50%. In 2022, Denmark and Greenland agreed to hold a two-year investigation into the program, known as the spiral case.

Until 11 June 2014, sterilization was required for legal sex change in Denmark.

=== Finland ===
Finland required forced sterilization for transgender adults to change their sex legally until 3 April 2023.

=== Germany ===
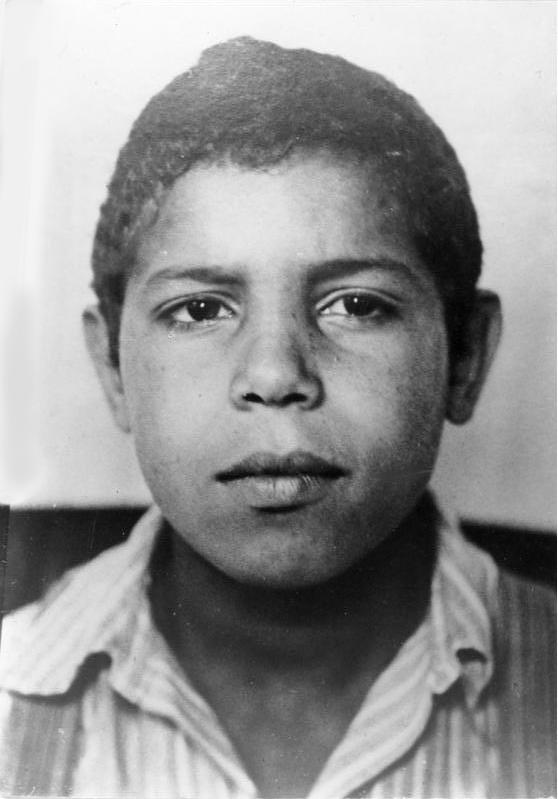
A young Rhinelander who was classified as a bastard and hereditarily unfit under the Nazi regime

One of the first acts by Adolf Hitler after the Reichstag Fire Decree and the Enabling Act of 1933 gave him de facto legal dictatorship over the German state was to pass the Law for the Prevention of Hereditarily Diseased Offspring (Gesetz zur Verhütung erbkranken Nachwuchses) in July 1933. The law was signed by Hitler himself, and over 200 eugenic courts were created specifically as a result of this law. Under it, all doctors in the Third Reich were required to report any patients of theirs who were deemed intellectually disabled, characterized mentally ill (including schizophrenia and manic depression), epileptic, blind, deaf, or physically deformed, and a steep monetary penalty was imposed for any patients who were not properly reported. Individuals with alcoholism or Huntington's disease could also be sterilized. The individual's case was then presented in front of a court of Nazi officials and public health officers who would review their medical records, take testimony from friends and colleagues, and eventually decide whether or not to order a sterilization operation performed upon the individual, using force if necessary. Though not explicitly covered by the law, 400 mixed-race "Rhineland Bastards" were also sterilized beginning in 1937. The sterilization program went on until the war started, with about 600,000 people sterilized.

By the end of World War II, over 400,000 individuals were sterilized under the German law and its revisions, most within its first four years of being enacted. When the issue of compulsory sterilization was brought up at the Nuremberg trials after the war, many Nazis defended their actions on the matter by indicating that it was the United States itself from which they had taken inspiration. The Nazis had many other eugenics-inspired racial policies, including their T-4 euthanasia program, in which around 70,000 people who were institutionalized or had birth defects were killed.

=== Guatemala ===
Guatemala is one country that resisted family planning programs, largely due to lack of governmental support, including civil war strife, and strong opposition from both the Catholic Church and Evangelical Christians until 2000 and, as such, has the lowest prevalence of contraceptive usage in Latin America. In the 1980s, the archbishop of the country accused USAID of mass sterilizations of women without consent, but President Reagan backed a commission that found the allegations to be false.

=== Iceland ===
Since 2019, nonconsensual sterilization has been forbidden in Iceland unless deemed medically necessary. However, this law only addresses the procedures of tubal ligation and surgical blocking of the fallopian tubes, excluding hysterectomies from the ban. Iceland's laws surrounding the legalization of sterilization practices also do not address the consent of the disabled individuals undergoing these procedures. In March 2023, mother Hermina Hreidarsdottir authorized a hysterectomy for her severely cognitively impaired 20-year-old daughter due to her abnormal menstrual cycle. Ms. Hreidarsdottir took the liberty of making this decision for her daughter without consulting her because she believed that this sterilization procedure would improve her daughter's quality of life.

=== India ===
The Emergency in India from 1975 to 1977 resulted from internal and external conflict for the country and resulted in the misuse of power and human rights violations by the government. On 6 August 1976, the state of Maharashtra became the first governmental unit to enact legislation that mandated the compulsory sterilization of men and women after the birth of a third child, passing the Family (Restrictions on Size) Bill on its third reading and sending it to the president of India for the required assent. The president reacted favorably and sent the bill back to the Maharashtra government with suggested amendments necessary for enactment. Before the measure could be passed, new elections were called, and the legislation was not passed. Another important case was the Uttawar forced sterilisations drive, leading to 800 sterilisations, which made international news.

Stopping short of forced sterilization, the national government enacted an incentive program for a family planning initiative that began in 1976 in an attempt to lower the exponentially increasing population. This program focused on male citizens and used propaganda and monetary incentives to encourage impoverished citizens to get sterilized. People who agreed to get sterilized would receive land, housing, and money or loans. This program led millions of men to receive vasectomies, and an undetermined number of these were coerced. There were reports of officials blocking off villages and dragging men to surgical centers for vasectomies. However, after much protest and opposition, the country switched to targeting women through coercion, withholding welfare or ration card benefits, and bribing women with food and money. This switch was theorized to be based on the principle women are less likely to protest for their own rights. Many deaths occurred as a result of both the male and the female sterilization programs. These deaths were likely attributed to poor sanitation standards and quality standards in the Indian sterilization camps.

Sanjay Gandhi, son of the then-Prime Minister Indira Gandhi, was largely responsible for what turned out to be a failed program. A strong mistrust of family planning initiatives followed the highly controversial program, the effect of which continues into the 21st century. Sterilization policies are still enforced in India, targeting mostly indigenous and lower-class women who are herded into the sterilization camps. The most recent abuse of family planning systems was highlighted by the death of 15 lower-class women in a sterilization center in Chhattisgarh in 2014. Despite these deaths, sterilization is still the highest used method of birth control, with 39% of women in India turning to sterilization in 2015.

According to Human Rights Law Network:

In September 2016, the Supreme Court of India directed the union government to ensure the discontinuation of 'sterilization camps' within the following three years and to induce the state governments to follow suit. It also charged the government to ensure proper monitoring of the programme, investigate sterilization failures, complications, or deaths, and increase the compensation amount in these cases. It further ordered the implementation of established legal, medical, and technical standards for sterilization [...] Women were made to lay on bare mattresses for the surgeries, with no post-surgery recuperation facilities. Often the women were made to wait up to five hours after registering, and by the time they reached the operating table, their aesthetic would have worn off. In places like Bhubaneshwar, Odisha, and Ferozpur, Uttar Pradesh, the doctors conducting surgeries would use bicycle pumps instead of an insufflator to introduce air into the women's abdomens (as reported by Shreelatha Menon). The doctor in Bhubaneshwar stated that he had done over 60,000 tubectomies, and many of them with bicycle pumps. In Kaparfora, Bihar, a woman was operated upon, even though she was pregnant, and suffered a miscarriage as a result. [...] Today, while laws may not announce eugenic aims, a hidden agenda to dispose of "undesirables" in society can still be discovered by looking beyond the face of the law. While many population control policies may appear benign on their face, upon further investigation the stated medical reasons for sterilization and the identification of groups to which the law applies are revealed to be morally and legally suspect. For example, compulsory sterilization laws often target LGBT+ people, especially transgender people.

Forced sterilization has been an issue that has also affected the disabled population of women in India. In 2016, the Right to Persons with Disabilities Act (RPWD) was introduced to legally address the problems faced by the disabled community and ensure equitable access to justice for all members of society:

"While the RPWD Act took a step towards recognizing the issue of forced abortions under Section 92(f)[1] which states that any medical procedure performed on a disabled woman without her express consent that leads to the termination of pregnancy is punishable with an imprisonment term, there is still no specific mention of forced sterilization as a problem."

There is no clause in the RPWD that addresses the notion of "expressed consent". In India, the issue of consent in regard to reproductive rights for disabled individuals has been fiercely debated.

=== Israel ===
In the late 2000s, reports in the Israeli media claimed that injections of long-acting contraceptive Depo-Provera had been forced on hundreds of Ethiopian-Jewish immigrants, both in transit camps in Ethiopia and after they arrived in Israel. In 2009, feminist NGO Haifa Women's Coalition published a first survey on the story, which was followed up by Israeli Educational Television a few years later. Ethiopian-Jewish women said they were intimidated or tricked into taking the shot every three months. In 2013, the Israeli Health Ministry instructed HMOs to stop automatically renewing Depo-Provera prescriptions for Ethiopian-Israelis if there was any chance that the patients did not fully understand the implications of the treatment.

=== Japan ===
In the first part of the reign of Emperor Hirohito, the Japanese government promoted increasing the number of healthy Japanese while simultaneously decreasing the number of people who were afflicted with intellectual disability, disability, genetic disease, and other conditions that led to inferiority in the Japanese gene pool.

The leprosy prevention laws of 1907, 1931, and 1953 permitted the segregation of patients in sanitariums where forced abortions and sterilization were common and authorized punishment of patients "disturbing peace". Korean patients were also subjected to hard labor under the colonial Korean Leprosy Prevention Ordinances.

The "National Eugenic Law" was promulgated in 1940 by the Konoe government, after rejection of the original "Race Eugenic Protection Law" in 1938. From 1940 to 1945, sterilization was done to 454 Japanese persons under this law. Appx. 25,000 people, including 8,500 under (forced or spontaneous) consent, were surgically processed until 1995.

According to the Eugenic Protection Law (1948), sterilization could be enforced upon criminals "with genetic predisposition to commit crime", patients with genetic diseases, including mild ones such as total color-blindness, hemophilia, albinism, ichthyosis, and mental affections such as schizophrenia, manic-depression possibly deemed occurrent in their opposition, and epilepsy. The mental sicknesses were added in 1952.

In early 2019, Japan's Supreme Court upheld a requirement that transgender people must have their reproductive organs removed.

In March 2019, Japan's legal policy about transgender people was:

In Japan, transgender people who want to change their gender legally must appeal to a family court under the GID Act, which was introduced in 2004. The procedure is discriminatory, requiring applicants to be single and without children under age 20, to undergo a psychiatric evaluation to receive a diagnosis of "gender identity disorder," and to be sterilized. The requirements rest on an outdated and pejorative notion that a transgender identity is a mental health condition and compel transgender people to undergo lengthy, expensive, invasive, and irreversible medical procedures.

The last stipulation of the GID Act concerning forced sterilization was recently overturned in October 2023. Japan's Supreme Court ruled that requiring transgender people to undergo sterilization so that they can legally change their gender identity is unconstitutional. The court stated that forcing the sterilization of the plaintiff, a transgender woman, as a requirement to change her gender on her Japanese family registry certificate was a restriction on "her freedom not to harm herself against her will." The court did not address the other requirement under the GID Act, which outlines that transgender people must undergo transition surgery to legally register as the gender with which they identify.

In July 2024, the Supreme Court of Japan ruled that the Eugenic Protection Law passed in 1948 was unconstitutional and eliminated the 20-year statute of limitations for those affected by the law.

=== Kenya ===
In Kenya, HIV was considered an ongoing issue, and the governor believed that compulsory sterilization of women infected with HIV could stop the spread of the virus. In 2012, a report titled "Robbed of Choice" sparked outrage. The report outlined the experiences of 40 women infected with HIV who had been sterilized against their will. 5 of the 40 women filed a lawsuit against the government of Kenya, claiming violations of their health and human rights. The majority of the women who were sterilized knew nothing about the procedure or its consequences, which was one reason they did not push the issue. The president thought it would be good to keep a list of women who had been infected with HIV, but by naming these women, many of them did not want to receive medical treatment due to the shame associated with the virus. "The authors concluded that punitive and restrictive laws related to pregnancy have numerous adverse consequences—both health-related and socioeconomic—for women and urged human rights groups to work with government institutions to protect and fulfill women's fundamental reproductive rights."

=== Nigeria ===
Laws in Ghana, Nigeria, and Tanzania involve references to medical operations where the intended benefit for the patient is not tied to any legal consequences for medical professionals involved. Specifically, the criminal code of Nigeria States that "performing with good faith and with reasonable care and skill a surgical operation upon any person for his benefit, if the performance of the operation is reasonable, having regard to the patient's state and to all the circumstances of the case."

In Nigeria, young girls with intellectual disabilities are susceptible to non-consensual sterilization. No current laws explicitly prevent involuntary sterilization. The laws that currently surround and may apply to the issue do not help prevent it. The African Commission on Human and Peoples' Rights declared that involuntary sterilization violates the right to "equality and non-discrimination, dignity, liberty, and security of the person."

Involuntary sterilization in Nigeria is more common for girls with intellectual disabilities than for boys with intellectual disabilities and more common for those with intellectual disabilities, specifically in comparison to other disabilities. Involuntary sterilization commonly occurs when relatives initiate it. In several studies involving parents of girls with disabilities who had initiated involuntary sterilization, respondents said that the primary reason for sterilization was to prevent pregnancy either for financial reasons or due to the risk of offspring with intellectual disabilities. However, similar motivations for sterilization were not common for girls without intellectual disabilities. There is also a gendered element of sterilization as the Nigerian law code penalizes emasculation, which makes it so that men cannot reproduce. There is no such penalization for the sterilization of women.

=== Mexico ===
Civil society organizations such as Balance, Promocion para el Desarrollo y Juventud, A.C., have received in recent years numerous testimonies of women living with HIV in which they state that misinformation about the virus transmission has frequently led to compulsory sterilization. Although there is enough evidence regarding the effectiveness of interventions aimed at reducing mother-to-child transmission risks, there are records of HIV-positive women forced to undergo sterilization or have agreed to be sterilized without adequate information about their options."

A report made in El Salvador, Honduras, Mexico, and Nicaragua concluded that women living with HIV, and whose health providers knew about it at the time of pregnancy, were six times more likely to experience forced or coerced sterilization in those countries. In addition, most of these women reported that health providers told them that living with HIV cancelled their right to choose the number and spacing of the children they want to have as well as the right to choose the contraceptive method of their choice; provided misleading information about the consequences for their health, and that of their children and denied them access to treatments that reduce mother-to-child HIV transmission to coerce them into sterilization.

This happens even when the health norm NOM 005-SSA2-1993 states that family planning is "the right of everyone to decide freely, responsibly, and in an informed way the number and spacing of their children and to obtain specialized information and proper services" and that "the exercise of this right is independent of gender, age, and social or legal status of persons."

=== Peru ===
In Peru, President Alberto Fujimori (in office from 1990 to 2000) has been accused of genocide and crimes against humanity as a result of the Programa Nacional de Población, a sterilization program put in place by his administration. During his presidency, Fujimori put in place a program of forced sterilizations against Indigenous people (mainly the Quechuas and the Aymaras) in the name of a "public health plan", presented on 28 July 1995. The plan was principally financed using funds from USAID ($36 million), the Nippon Foundation, and later, the United Nations Population Fund (UNFPA). On 9 September 1995, Fujimori presented a bill that would revise the "General Law of Population" to allow sterilization. Several contraceptive methods were also legalized, all measures that were strongly opposed by the Roman Catholic Church and its personal prelature Opus Dei. In February 1996, the World Health Organization (WHO) itself congratulated Fujimori on his success in controlling demographic growth.

On 25 February 1998, a representative for USAID testified before the U.S. government's House Committee on International Relations to address controversy surrounding Peru's program. He indicated that the government of Peru was making important changes to the program in order to:

- Discontinue their campaigns in tubal ligations and vasectomies.
- Make clear to health workers that there are no provider targets for voluntary surgical contraception or any other method of contraception.
- Implement a comprehensive monitoring program to ensure compliance with family planning norms and informed consent procedures.
- Welcome Ombudsman Office investigations of complaints received and respond to any additional complaints that are submitted as a result of the public request for any additional concerns.
- Implement a 72-hour "waiting period" for people who choose tubal ligation or vasectomy. This waiting period will occur between the second counseling session and surgery.
- Require health facilities to be certified as appropriate for performing surgical contraception as a means to ensure that no operations are done in makeshift or substandard facilities.

In September 2001, Minister of Health Luis Solari launched a special commission into the activities of voluntary surgical contraception, initiating a parliamentary commission tasked with inquiring into the "irregularities" of the program and to put it on an acceptable footing. In July 2002, its final report ordered by the Minister of Health revealed that between 1995 and 2000, 331,600 women were sterilized, while 25,590 men submitted to vasectomies. The plan, which had the objective of diminishing the number of births in areas of poverty within Peru, was essentially directed at the Indigenous people living in deprived areas (areas often involved in internal conflicts with the Peruvian government, as with the Shining Path guerrilla group). Deputy Dora Núñez Dávila accused, in September 2003, that 400,000 Indigenous people were sterilized during the 1990s. Documents proved that President Fujimori was informed, each month, of the number of sterilizations done by his former ministers of health, Eduardo Yong Motta (1994–1996), Marino Costa Bauer (1996–1999), and Alejandro Aguinaga (1999–2000). A study by sociologist Giulia Tamayo León, Nada Personal (in English: Nothing Personal), showed that doctors were required to meet quotas. According to Le Monde diplomatique, "tubal ligation festivals" were organized through publicity campaigns, held in the pueblos jóvenes (in English: shantytowns). In 1996, there were, according to official statistics, 81,762 tubal ligations performed on women, peaking the following year, with 109,689 ligations, then only 25,995 in 1998.

On 21 October 2011, Peru's Attorney General José Bardales decided to reopen an investigation into the cases, which had been halted in 2009 under the statute of limitations, after the Inter-American Commission on Human Rights ruled that President Fujimori's sterilization program involved crimes against humanity, which are not time-limited. It is unclear as to any progress in the matter of the execution (debido ejecución sumaria) of the suspect in the course of any proof of their relevant accusations in the legal sphere of the constituted people in vindication of the rights of the people of South America. It may carry a parallel to any suspect cases for international investigation in any other continent and be in the sphere of medical genocide. As of 12 December 2021:

A Peruvian judge ruled last week that the 83-year-old could not be brought to court because of the forced sterilization, as the allegation was not included in an old extradition request for Fujimori. The ex-president was extradited from Chile to Peru in 2007. According to the judge, Chile's Supreme Court, which gave the go-ahead for extradition at the time, must agree to Fujimori's charge of forced sterilization.

=== Russia ===
Since children cannot legally live in psychoneurologic internats in Russia (state-run residential institutions for adults with mental disabilities), and there are no institutions where internats' patients can live with their children, almost all pregnancies within PNIs are aborted. During abortions, PNI patients are also often subjected to forced sterilization—their fallopian tubes are tied, motivated by allegedly detected "serious complications".

=== South Africa ===
In South Africa, there have been multiple reports of HIV-positive women sterilized without their informed consent and sometimes without their knowledge. The Commission for Gender Equality investigated 48 sterilizations that were performed in fifteen state hospitals without patient consent from 2002 to 2005. This investigation into these hospitals revealed that medical providers threatened not to assist women during birth if they did not sign consent forms to be sterilized. In most cases, these forms were not explained to patients by medical personnel. However, the inquiry was hampered by hostile hospital staff and the sudden "disappearance" of patient files. An interview with one of these patients revealed that she did not learn that she had been sterilized during her C-section until a physician told her eleven years after that she had no uterus. She went to the hospital were the surgery was performed and was told by a physician that it was done to save her life and consent was received from her mother. The patient did not have HIV or any other life-threatening condition, and her mother had not consented to the removal of her uterus. The report from the Commission for Gender Equality noted that some of the patients interviewed were given consent forms that they did not understand and were coerced to sign. The bulk of these operations were performed to prevent women who are HIV-positive from having more children. The HIV epidemic in South Africa has a prevalence of 13% and has largely affected the family structures in the country. Medical staff of these hospitals have justified their actions as an effort to stop the growing HIV numbers in the country that exhaust the healthcare systems. The Commission urged Health Minister Zweli Mkhize to take action against these state hospitals and to provide some form of redress to the many affected women.

=== Sweden ===
The eugenics program in Sweden was enacted in 1934 and was formally abolished in 1976. According to the 2000 governmental report, 21,000 were estimated to have been forcibly sterilized, 6,000 were coerced into a 'voluntary' sterilization and the nature of a further 4,000 cases could not be determined. Of those sterilized 93% were women. The reasons given for these sterilizations included mental slowness, racial differences, antisocial behavior, promiscuous behavior, and other behaviors deemed inappropriate. At the time, the government saw itself as a forward-thinking and enlightened welfare state. The Swedish state subsequently formed a commission of inquiry to determine victims who could claim compensation for trauma at the hands of the state. The sterilization program ended in the government paying over $22,000 in compensation to victims.

Until December 2012, Swedish law forced transgender individuals to be sterilized before having their legal documents updated. After the law was repealed, those who were forcibly sterilized under the law began to demand compensation. In 2017, the government announced that it will pay these compensations.

=== Switzerland ===
Compulsory sterilization in Switzerland was practiced from the early 20th century until the 1970s, driven by eugenics, psychiatric evaluations, and social welfare policies. Several thousand individuals, mostly women, were sterilized based on psychiatric assessments. Initially, castration was used for eugenic purposes, but by the 1910s, sterilization became the preferred method to prevent procreation among those deemed "hereditarily burdened" or socially dependent. From the mid-1920s, sterilizations were often linked to abortion approvals, involving de facto coercion despite formal consent, particularly in urban cantons like Zürich, Basel, and Bern.

Over 90% of sterilizations targeted women until the mid-20th century due to unwanted pregnancies and gendered behavioral norms. Men faced castration from the 1920s as a criminal policy measure to reduce sexual delinquency, affecting at least 500–800 men until the 1970s, when chemical options emerged. Rural Catholic cantons like Fribourg and Valais had fewer sterilizations compared to urban Protestant areas.

Before 2005, sterilization lacked uniform federal regulation, with only Aargau, Neuchâtel, and Fribourg having specific laws requiring consent and oversight for those incapable of discernment.

Since 2005, the Sterilization Act permits sterilization only for adults capable of discernment with free, informed written consent. Sterilization of those incapable of discernment is generally prohibited, with rare exceptions for individuals over 16, requiring approval from adult protection authorities and expert assessments to confirm necessity and lack of alternatives.

=== United Kingdom ===
In 1911, while he was serving as Home Secretary, Winston Churchill favored the sterilization of feeble-minded persons. Reginald McKenna, who succeeded Churchill as Home Secretary, introduced the Feeble-Minded Control Bill, a bill that would enact forcible sterilization of such individuals; the bill gained the support of the Anglican archbishops of Canterbury and York, which included forced sterilization. Despite support for the bill by the Anglican primates, English writer G. K. Chesterton and the Catholic Church in the United Kingdom led a successful effort to defeat that clause's inclusion in what would eventually become the 1913 Mental Deficiency Act, though the final act did create a scheme for state-enforced confinement of mentally disabled persons in specialized institutions. In 1934, the Brock Report recommended sterilisation of people who were mentally and physically disabled, but its proposals did not gain enough support to be made law.

In one specific case in 2015, the Court of Protection of the United Kingdom ruled that a woman with six children and an IQ of 70 should be sterilized for her own safety because another pregnancy would have been a "significantly life-threatening event" for her and the fetus and was not related to eugenics.

=== United States ===
Forced sterilization laws in the United States: Forced sterilization is allowed. Status of forced sterilization is unclear. Forced sterilization is prohibited.

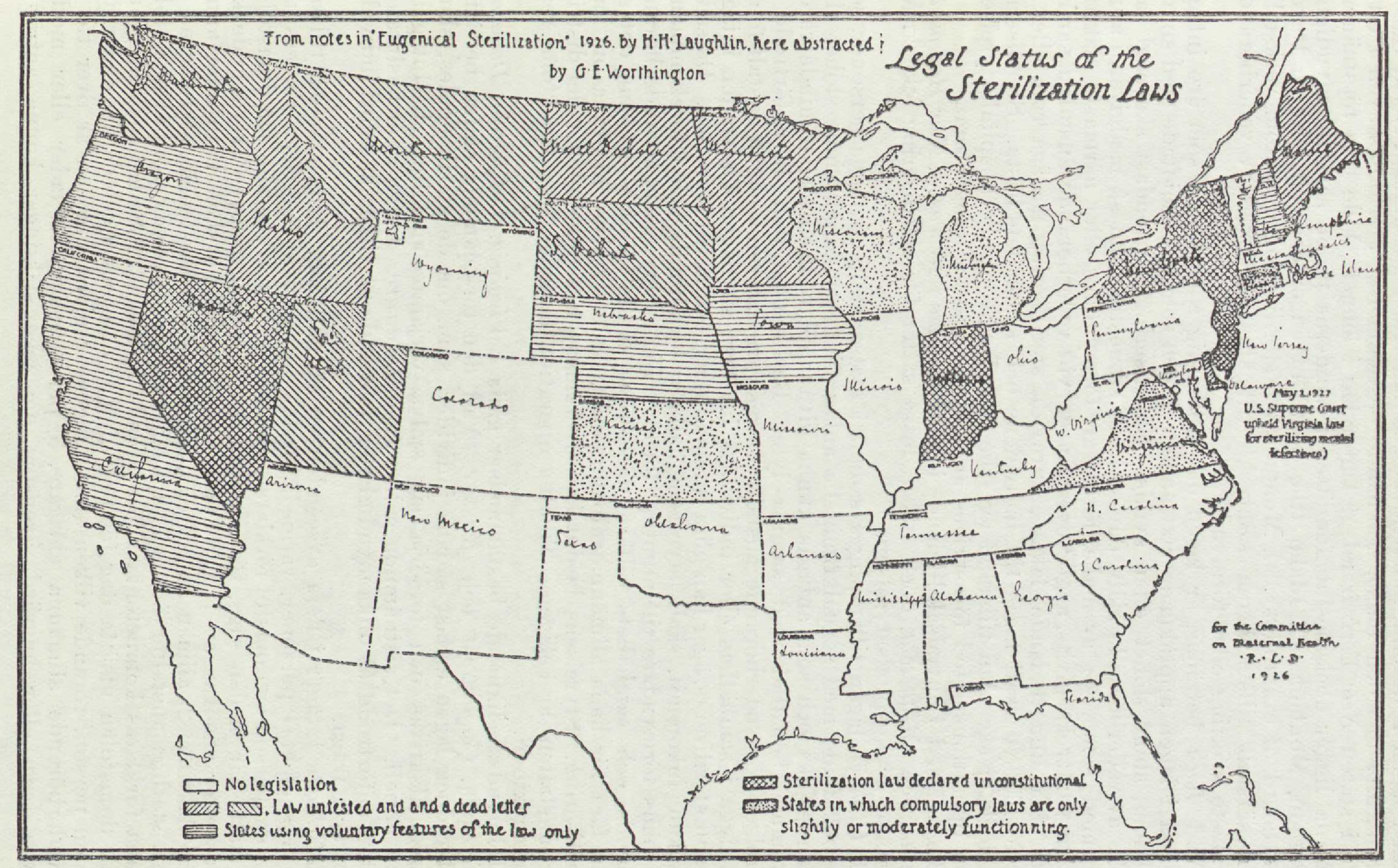
A map from a 1929 Swedish royal commission report displays the U.S. states that had implemented sterilization legislation by then.

During the Progressive Era (c. 1890 to 1920), the United States was the first country to undertake compulsory sterilization programs concertedly for eugenics. Thomas C. Leonard, a professor at Princeton University, describes American eugenics and sterilization as ultimately rooted in economic arguments and further as a central element of Progressivism alongside minimum wage laws, restricted immigration, and the introduction of pension programs. The heads of the programs were avid proponents of eugenics and frequently argued for their programs which achieved some success nationwide mainly in the first half of the 20th century.

Eugenics had two essential components. First, its advocates accepted as axiomatic that a range of mental and physical handicaps—blindness, deafness, and many forms of mental illness—were largely, if not entirely, hereditary in cause. Second, they assumed that these scientific hypotheses could be used as the basis of social engineering across several policy areas, including family planning, education, and immigration. The most direct policy implications of eugenic thought were that "mental defectives" should not produce children, since they would only replicate these deficiencies, and that such individuals from other countries should be kept out of the polity. The principal targets of the American sterilization programs were intellectually disabled people and the mentally ill, but also targeted under many state laws were the deaf, the blind, people with epilepsy, and the physically deformed. The definition of who was "fit" and who was "unfit" was also heavily inspired by racism, classism, and sexism. Someone could be declared "unfit" or "feeble-minded" for reasons such as race, immigration status, poverty, promiscuity/becoming pregnant out of wedlock, criminal behavior, and more.

A relative minority of sterilizations targeting crime took place in prisons and other penal institutions. In the end, over 65,000 individuals were sterilized in 33 states under state compulsory sterilization programs in the United States. The number of undocumented cases likely far exceeded this number.

The first state to introduce a compulsory sterilization bill was Michigan, in 1897, but the proposed law failed to pass. Eight years later, Pennsylvania's state legislators passed a sterilization bill that was vetoed by the governor. Indiana became the first state to enact sterilization legislation in 1907, followed closely by California and Washington in 1909. From 1912 to 1921, critics of eugenics challenged eight sterilization laws and had seven struck down across various states. Over the next four years, multiple states passed new compulsory sterilization laws that met the standards of the new rulings. Virginia's new law led to the landmark Buck v. Bell case that upheld the Virginia compulsory sterilization law, with the infamous closing by Justice Oliver Wendell Holmes that "three generations of imbeciles are enough." Several other states followed, but such legislation remained controversial enough to be defeated in some cases, as in Wyoming in 1934. In the 1920s, eugenicists were particularly interested in Black women in the South and Latina women in the Southwest to break the chain of welfare dependency and curb the population rise of non-white citizens. There were many cases of marginalized women, particularly Black women, who would go in for a different procedure, commonly an appendectomy, and their uterus would be removed without their informed consent.

After World War II, public opinion towards eugenics and sterilization programs became more negative in the light of the connection with the genocidal policies of Nazi Germany. A significant number of sterilizations continued in a few states through the 1970s. Between 1970 and 1976, the Indian Health Service sterilized between 25 and 42 percent of women of reproductive age who came in seeking healthcare services. The 1973 involuntary sterilization of Minnie Lee and Mary Alice Relf, aged 12 and 14, in Montgomery, Alabama resulted in the Relf v. Weinberger lawsuit that brought national attention to thousands of Black, Latina, and Indigenous women who were coercively sterilized. In California, ten women who delivered their children at LAC-USC hospital between 1971 and 1974 and were sterilized without proper consent sued the hospital in the landmark Madrigal v. Quilligan case in 1975. The plaintiffs lost the case, but numerous changes to the consent process were made following the ruling, such as offering consent forms in the patient's native language, and a 72-hour waiting period between giving consent and undergoing the procedure.

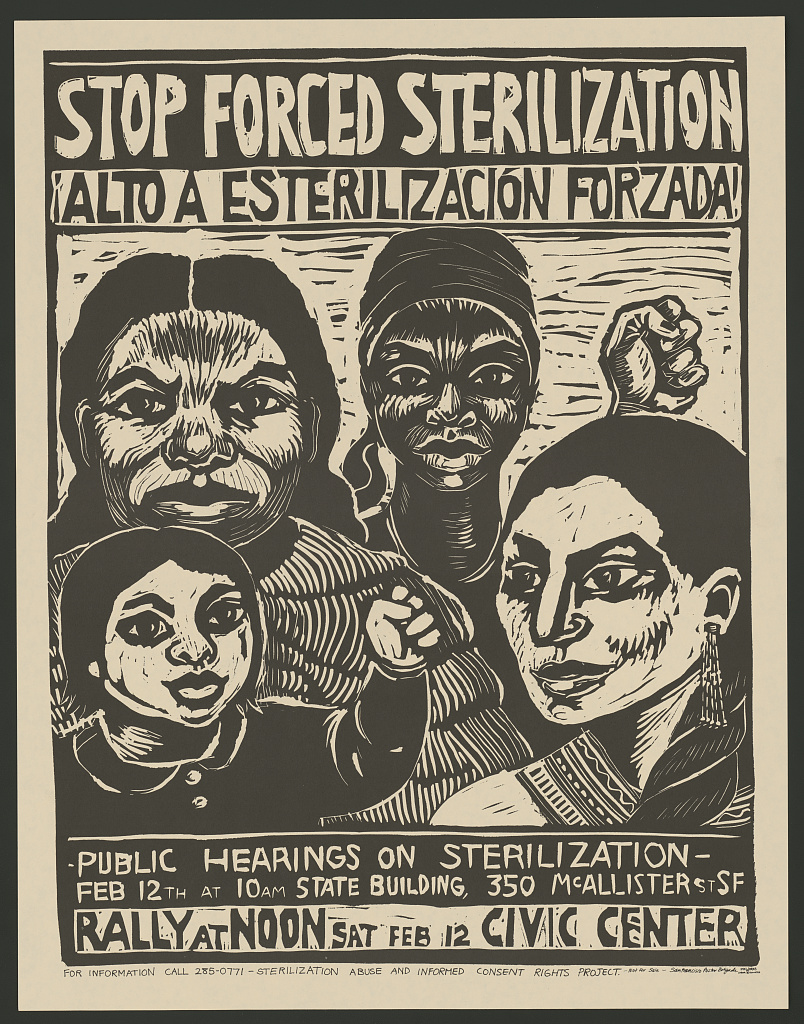
Bilingual poster in English and Spanish for a rally against forced sterilization

The Oregon Board of Eugenics, later renamed the Board of Social Protection, existed until 1983, with the last forcible sterilization occurring in 1981. The U.S. commonwealth of Puerto Rico had a sterilization program as well. Some states continued to have sterilization laws on the books for much longer after that, though they were rarely, if ever, used. California sterilized more than any other state by a wide margin and was responsible for over a third of all sterilization operations. Information about the California sterilization program was produced into book form and widely disseminated by eugenicists E. S. Gosney and Paul Popenoe, which was said by the government of Adolf Hitler to be of key importance in proving that large-scale compulsory sterilization programs were feasible.

In recent years, the governors of many states have made public apologies for their past programs, beginning with Virginia and followed by Oregon and California. Few have offered to compensate those sterilized, however, citing that few are likely still living (and would of course have no affected offspring) and that inadequate records remain by which to verify them. At least one compensation case, Poe v. Lynchburg Training School & Hospital (1981), was filed in the courts because the sterilization law was unconstitutional. It was rejected because the law was no longer in effect at the time of the filing. However, the petitioners were granted some compensation because the stipulations of the law itself, which required informing the patients about their operations, had not been carried out in many cases. The 27 states where sterilization laws remained on the books (though not all were still in use) in 1956 were Arizona, California, Connecticut, Delaware, Georgia, Idaho, Indiana, Iowa, Kansas, Maine, Michigan, Minnesota, Mississippi, Montana, Nebraska, New Hampshire, North Carolina, North Dakota, Oklahoma, Oregon, South Carolina, South Dakota, Utah, Vermont, Virginia, Washington, West Virginia, and Wisconsin. Some states still have forced sterilization laws in effect, such as Washington state.

As of January 2011, discussions were underway regarding compensation for the victims of forced sterilization under the authorization of the Eugenics Board of North Carolina. Governor Bev Perdue formed the NC Justice for Sterilization Victims Foundation in 2010 in order "to provide justice and compensate victims who were forcibly sterilized by the State of North Carolina." In 2013 North Carolina announced that it would spend $10 million beginning in June 2015 to compensate men and women who were sterilized in the state's eugenics program; North Carolina sterilized 7,600 people from 1929 to 1974 who were deemed socially or mentally unfit.

The inability to pay for the cost of raising children has been a reason courts have ordered coercive or compulsory sterilization. In June 2014, a Virginia judge ruled that a man on probation for child endangerment must be able to pay for his seven children before having more children; the man agreed to get a vasectomy as part of his plea deal. In 2013, an Ohio judge ordered a man owing nearly $100,000 in unpaid child support to "make all reasonable efforts to avoid impregnating a woman" as a condition of his probation. Kevin Maillard wrote that conditioning the right to reproduction on meeting child support obligations amounts to "constructive sterilization" for men unlikely to make the payments.

On 19 July 2021 it was reported that:

"under new provisions signed into California's budget this week, the state will offer reparations for the thousands of people who were sterilized in California institutions, without adequate consent, often because they were deemed "criminal", "feeble-minded" or "deviant"."

and that

"The program will be the first in the nation to provide compensation to modern-day survivors of prison system sterilizations, like Dillon, whose attorney obtained medical records to show that, while she was an inmate in the Central California women's facility in Chowchilla, surgeons had removed her ovaries during what was supposed to be an operation to take a biopsy and remove a cyst.

The investigations sparked by her case, which is featured in the documentary Belly of the Beast, showed hundreds of inmates had been sterilized in prisons without proper consent as late as 2010, even though the practice was by then illegal.

The new California reparations program will also seek to compensate hundreds of living survivors of the state's earlier eugenics campaign, which was first codified into state law in 1909 and wasn't repealed until 1979."

==== Georgia immigration detention center 2020 ====
In 2020, four non-profit organizations (which are listed below) joined Dawn Wooten to accuse a privately owned U.S. immigration detention center in the U.S. state of Georgia of forcibly sterilizing women. The reports claimed that a doctor conducted unauthorized medical procedures upon women who were detained by Immigration and Customs Enforcement. Dawn Wooten was a nurse and former employee. She claims that a high rate of sterilizations was performed upon Spanish-speaking women and women who spoke various indigenous languages that are common in Latin America. Wooten said that the center did not obtain proper consent for these surgeries or lied to women about the medical procedures. More than 40 women submitted testimony in writing to document these abuses.

In September 2020, Mexico demanded more information from U.S. authorities about medical procedures that were performed upon illegal immigrants in detention centers, after allegations that six Mexican women were sterilized without their consent. The ministry said that consulate personnel had interviewed 18 Mexican women who were detained at the center, none of whom "claimed to have undergone a hysterectomy". Another woman said that she had undergone a gynecological operation, although there was nothing in her detention file to support that she had agreed to the procedure.

The nurse said that detained women told her they did not fully understand why they had to get a hysterectomy.

Project South, the Georgia Detention Watch, the Georgia Latino Alliance for Human Rights, and the South Georgia Immigrant Support Network filed a complaint with the government on behalf of detained immigrants and the nurse.

U.S. congresswoman Pramila Jayapal has called for an urgent investigation into allegations that at least 17 women were subjected to unnecessary gynecological procedures that she called "the most abhorrent of human rights violations".

==== Effect on disabled persons ====
As stated previously, eugenics in the United States spread to target mentally disabled persons. Sterilization rates across the country were relatively low, with the sole exception of California, until the 1927 U.S. Supreme Court decision in Buck v. Bell, which upheld under the U.S. Constitution the forced sterilization of patients at a Virginia home for intellectually disabled people. In the wake of that decision, over 62,000 people in the United States, most of them women, were sterilized. The number of sterilizations performed per year increased until another Supreme Court case, Skinner v. Oklahoma, 1942, complicated the legal situation by ruling against sterilization of criminals if the equal protection clause of the constitution was violated. That is, if sterilization were to be performed, then it could not exempt white-collar criminals. This case, however, does not directly overturn the decision made in Buck v. Bell. Instead, it invalidates the central argument of the decision and has been used in several cases to deny guardians the right to sterilize the disabled person under their care.

The Congress of Obstetricians and Gynecologists (ACOG) believes that mental disability is not a reason to deny sterilization. The opinion of ACOG is that "the physician must consult with the patient's family, agents, and other caregivers" if sterilization is desired for a mentally limited patient. In 2003, Douglas Diekema wrote in Volume 9 of the journal Mental Retardation and Developmental Disabilities Research Reviews that "involuntary sterilization ought not be performed on mentally retarded persons who retain the capacity for reproductive decision-making, the ability to raise a child, or the capacity to provide valid consent to marriage." The Journal of Medical Ethics claimed, in a 1999 article, that doctors are regularly confronted with requests to sterilize mentally limited people who cannot give consent for themselves. The article recommends that sterilization should only occur when there is a "situation of necessity" and the "benefits of sterilization outweigh the drawbacks."

The American Journal of Bioethics published an article in 2010, which concluded that the interventions used in the Ashley treatment may benefit future patients. These interventions, at the request of the parents and guidance from the physicians, included a hysterectomy and surgical removal of the breast buds of the mentally and physically disabled child. Proponents of the treatments argue that they protect disabled persons from sexual assault, unwanted pregnancy, and difficulties of menstruation. The interventions are still legal in many states, despite the argument that it violates a person's constitutional right to avoid unwanted intrusions. Discussion on the involuntary sterilization of disabled persons is now largely focused on the right of a guardian to request sterilization.

==== Criminal justice system ====
In addition to eugenic purposes, sterilization was used as a punitive measure against sex offenders, people identified as homosexual, or people deemed to masturbate too much. California, the first state in the U.S. to enact compulsory sterilization based on eugenics, sterilized all prison inmates under the 1909 sterilization law. In the last 40 years, judges have offered lighter punishment (i.e., probation instead of jail sentences) to people willing to use contraception or be sterilized, particularly in child abuse/endangerment cases. One of the most famous cases of this was People v. Darlene Johnson, during which Johnson, a woman charged with child abuse sentenced to seven years in prison, was offered probation and a reduced prison sentence if she agreed to use Norplant.

In addition to child abuse cases, some politicians proposed bills mandating Norplant use among women on public assistance as a requirement to maintain welfare benefits. As noted above, some judges offered probation instead of prison time to women who agreed to use Norplant, while other court cases have ordered parents to cease childbearing until regaining custody of their children after abuse cases. Some legal scholars and ethicists argue that such practices are inherently coercive. Furthermore, such scholars link these practices to eugenic policies of the 19th and early 20th centuries, highlighting how such practices not only targeted poor people in the U.S. but disproportionately impacted minority women and families, particularly Black women.

In the late 1970s, to acknowledge the history of forced and coercive sterilizations and prevent ongoing eugenics/population control efforts, the federal government implemented a standardized informed consent process and specific eligibility criteria for government-funded sterilization procedures. Some scholars argue that the extensive consent process and 30-day waiting period go beyond preventing instances of coercion and serve as a barrier to desired sterilization for women relying on public insurance.

Though formal eugenics laws are no longer routinely implemented and have been removed from government documents, instances of reproductive coercion still take place in U.S. institutions today. In 2011, investigative news released a report revealing that between 2006 and 2011, 148 female prisoners in two California state prisons were sterilized without adequate informed consent. In September 2014, California enacted Bill SB 1135 that bans sterilization in correctional facilities unless the procedure is required in a medical emergency to preserve an inmate's life.

==== Puerto Rico ====
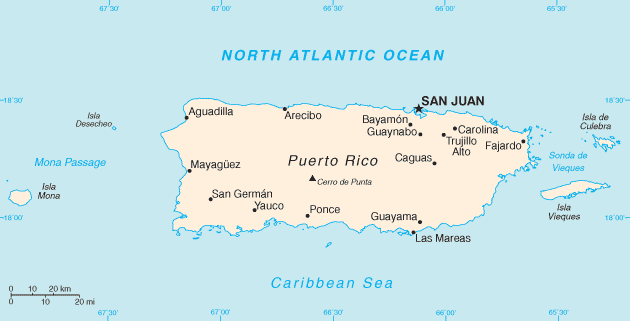
A political map of Puerto Rico

Puerto Rican physician Lanauze Rolón founded the League for Birth Control in Ponce, Puerto Rico, in 1925. The league was quickly squashed by opposition from the Catholic church. A similar league was founded seven years later, in 1932, in San Juan, and continued in operation for two years before opposition and lack of support forced its closure. Yet another effort at establishing birth control clinics was made in 1934 by the Federal Emergency Relief Administration in a relief response to the conditions of the Great Depression. As a part of this effort, 68 birth control clinics were opened on the island. The next mass opening of clinics occurred in January 1937, when American Clarence Gamble, in association with a group of wealthy and influential Puerto Ricans, organized the Maternal and Infant Health Association and opened 22 birth control clinics.

The Governor of Puerto Rico, Blanton Winship, enacted Law 116, which went into effect on 13 May 1937. It was a birth control and eugenic sterilization law that allowed the dissemination of information regarding birth control methods and legalized the practice of birth control. The government cited a growing population of the poor and unemployed as motivators for the law. Changes were made to the Penal Code in 1937, which made abortion effectively legal. It was allowed for health reasons, without specifying details in the law. This gave doctors discretion to interpret what constituted a health reason, effectively legalizing abortion. By 1965, approximately 34 percent of women of childbearing age had been sterilized, two thirds of whom were still in their early twenties. The law was repealed on 8 June 1960.

===== 1940s–1950s =====
Unemployment and widespread poverty would continue to grow in Puerto Rico in the 1940s, both threatening U.S. private investment in Puerto Rico and acting as a deterrent for future investment. In an attempt to attract additional U.S. private investment in Puerto Rico, another round of liberalizing trade policies was implemented and referred to as "Operation Bootstrap". Despite these policies and their relative success, unemployment and poverty in Puerto Rico remained high, high enough to prompt an increase in emigration from Puerto Rico to the United States between 1950 and 1955. The issues of immigration, Puerto Rican poverty, and threats to U.S. private investment made population control a prime political and social issue for the United States.

The 50s also saw the production of social science research supporting sterilization procedures in Puerto Rico. Princeton's Office of Population Research, in collaboration with the Social Research Department at the University of Puerto Rico, conducted interviews with couples regarding sterilization and other birth control. Their studies concluded that there was a significant need and desire for permanent birth control among Puerto Ricans. In response, Puerto Rico's governor and Commissioner of Health opened 160 private, temporary birth control clinics with the specific purpose of sterilization.

Also during this era, private birth control clinics were established in Puerto Rico with funds provided by wealthy Americans. Joseph Sunnen, a wealthy American Republican and industrialist, established the Sunnen Foundation in 1957. The foundation funded new birth control clinics under the title "La Asociación Puertorriqueña de Bienestar de la Familia" and spent hundreds of thousands of dollars on an experimental project to determine if a formulaic program could be used to control population growth in Puerto Rico and beyond.

===== Sterilization procedures and coercion =====
From the beginning of the 1900s, U.S. and Puerto Rican governments espoused rhetoric connecting the poverty of Puerto Rico with overpopulation and the "hyper-fertility" of Puerto Ricans. Such rhetoric, combined with the eugenics ideology of reducing "population growth among a particular class or ethnic group because they are considered...a social burden", was the philosophical basis for the 1937 birth control legislation enacted in Puerto Rico. A Puerto Rican Eugenics Board, modeled after a similar board in the United States, was created as part of the bill and officially ordered ninety-seven involuntary sterilizations.

The legalization of sterilization was followed by a steady increase in the popularity of the procedure, both among the Puerto Rican population and among physicians working in Puerto Rico. Though sterilization could be performed on men and women, women were most likely to undergo the procedure. Sterilization was most frequently recommended by physicians because of a pervasive belief that Puerto Ricans and the poor were not intelligent enough to use other forms of contraception. Physicians and hospitals alike also implemented hospital policy to encourage sterilization, with some hospitals refusing to admit healthy pregnant women for delivery unless they consented to be sterilized. This has been best documented at Presbyterian Hospital, where the unofficial policy for a time was to refuse admittance for delivery to women who already had three living children unless they consented to sterilization. There is additional evidence that true informed consent was not obtained from patients before they underwent sterilization, if consent was solicited at all.

By 1949, a survey of Puerto Rican women found that 21% of women interviewed had been sterilized, with sterilizations being performed in 18% of all hospital births statewide as a routine post-partum procedure, with the sterilization operation performed before women left the hospitals after giving birth. As for the birth control clinics founded by Sunnen, the Puerto Rican Family Planning Association reported that around 8,000 women and 3,000 men had been sterilized in Sunnen's privately funded clinics. At one point, the levels of sterilization in Puerto Rico were so high that they alarmed the Joint Committee for Hospital Accreditation, which then demanded that Puerto Rican hospitals limit sterilizations to ten percent of all hospital deliveries to receive accreditation. The high popularity of sterilization continued into the 60s and 70s, during which the Puerto Rican government made the procedures available for free or at reduced fees. The effects of the sterilization and contraception campaigns of the 1900s in Puerto Rico are still felt in Puerto Rican cultural history today.

====== Controversy and opposing opinions ======
There has been much debate and scholarly analysis concerning the legitimacy of choice given to Puerto Rican women regarding sterilization, reproduction, and birth control, as well as the ethics of economically motivated mass-sterilization programs.

Some scholars, such as Bonnie Mass and Iris Lopez, have argued that the history and popularity of mass sterilization in Puerto Rico represents a government-led eugenics initiative for population control. They cite the private and government funding of sterilization, coercive practices, and the eugenics ideology of Puerto Rican and American governments and physicians as evidence of a mass-sterilization campaign.

On the other side of the debate, scholars like Laura Briggs have argued that evidence does not substantiate claims of a mass-sterilization program. She further argues that reducing the popularity of sterilization in Puerto Rico to a state initiative ignores the legacy of Puerto Rican feminist activism in favor of birth control legalization and the individual agency of Puerto Rican women in making decisions about family planning.

California state senator Nancy Skinner proposed a system to compensate victims of the well-documented examples of prison sterilizations that resulted from California's eugenics programs, but this did not pass by the bill's 2018 deadline in the legislature.

===== Effects =====
When the United States took a census of Puerto Rico in 1899, the birth rate was 40 births per thousand people. By 1961, the birth rate had dropped to 30.8 per thousand. In 1955, 16.5% of Puerto Rican women of childbearing age had been sterilized; this jumped to 34% in 1965.

In 1969, sociologist Harriet Presser analyzed the 1965 Master Sample Survey of Health and Welfare in Puerto Rico. She specifically analyzed data from the survey for women ages 20 to 49 who had at least one birth, resulting in an overall sample size of 1,071 women. She found that over 34% of women aged 20–49 had been sterilized in Puerto Rico in 1965.

Presser's analysis also found that 46.7% of women who reported they were sterilized were between the ages of 34 and 39. Of the sample of women sterilized, 46.6% had been married 15 to 19 years, 43.9% had been married for 10-to-14 years, and 42.7% had been married for 20-to-24 years. Nearly 50% of women sterilized had three or four births. Over 1/3 of women who reported being sterilized were sterilized in their twenties, with the average age of sterilization being 26.

A survey by a team of Americans in 1975 confirmed Presser's assessment that nearly 1/3 of Puerto Rican women of childbearing age had been sterilized. As of 1977, Puerto Rico had the highest proportion of childbearing-aged persons sterilized in the world. In 1993, ethnographic work done in New York by anthropologist Iris Lopez showed that the history of sterilization continued to affect the lives of Puerto Rican women even after they immigrated to the United States and lived there for generations. The history of the popularity of sterilization in Puerto Rico meant that Puerto Rican women living in America had high rates of female family members who had undergone sterilization, and it remained a highly popular form of birth control among Puerto Rican women living in New York.

=== Uzbekistan ===
According to reports, as of 2012, forced and coerced sterilization is the current governmental policy in Uzbekistan for women with two or three children, as a means of forcing population control and to improve maternal mortality rates. In November 2007, a report by the United Nations Committee Against Torture reported that "the large number of cases of forced sterilization and removal of reproductive organs of women at reproductive age after their first or second pregnancy indicate that the Uzbek government is trying to control the birth rate in the country" and noted that such actions were not against the national Criminal Code. In response to that, the Uzbek delegation to the associated conference was "puzzled by the suggestion of forced sterilization and could not see how this could be enforced."

Reports of forced sterilizations, hysterectomies, and IUD insertions first emerged in 2005, although it is reported that the practice originated in the late 1990s, with reports of a secret decree dating from 2000. The current policy was allegedly instituted by Islam Karimov under Presidential Decree PP-1096, which is titled "on additional measures to protect the health of the mother and child, the formation of a healthy generation", and which came into force in 2009. In 2005, Deputy Health Minister Assomidin Ismoilov confirmed that doctors in Uzbekistan were being held responsible for increased birth rates.

Based upon a report by the journalist Natalia Antelava, doctors reported that the Ministry of Health told them that they must perform surgical sterilizations on women. One doctor reported: "It's ruling number 1098, and it says that after two children, in some areas after three, a woman should be sterilized." In a loss of the former surface decency of Central Asian mores regarding female chastity. In 2010, the Ministry of Health passed a decree stating all clinics in Uzbekistan should have sterilization equipment ready for use. The same report also states that sterilization is to be done voluntarily with the informed consent of the patient. In the 2010 Human Rights Report of Uzbekistan, there were many reports of forced sterilization of women, along with allegations of the government pressuring doctors to sterilize women to control the population. Doctors also reported to Antelava that there are quotas they must reach every month on how many women they need to sterilize. These orders are passed on to them through their bosses and, allegedly, from the government.

On 15 May 2012, during a meeting with the Russian president Vladimir Putin in Moscow, the Uzbek president Islam Karimov said, "We are doing everything in our hands to make sure that the population growth rate [in Uzbekistan] does not exceed 1.2–1.3" The Uzbek version of RFE/RL reported that, with this statement, Karimov indirectly admitted that forced sterilization of women is indeed taking place in Uzbekistan. The main Uzbek television channel, called O'zbekiston, cut out Karimov's statement about the population growth rate while broadcasting his conversation with Putin.

Despite international agreement concerning the inhumanity and illegality of forced sterilization, it has been suggested that the government of Uzbekistan continues to pursue such programs.

=== Other countries ===
Eugenics programs, including forced sterilization, existed in most of the Northern European countries, as well as in Latin America. Other countries that had notably active sterilization programs include Denmark (1935–1976), Norway, Finland Estonia, Switzerland, Iceland, and some countries in Latin America (including Bolivia, Chile, and the Dominican Republic). In Europe, Roma and Traveler communities are at particular risk of sterilisation, whereas in Latin America, indigenous people and Afro-descendants are disproportionately affected.

== See also ==
- Medical industrial complex
- Outline of genocide studies
- Anti-natalism
- Birth control
- Chemical castration
- Christian views on contraception
- Eugenics
  - Eugenics in the United States
  - History of eugenics
  - New eugenics
- Forced pregnancy
- Germany Must Perish!
- Human overpopulation
- La Operación
- Legal status of human sterilization by country
- Reproductive rights
- Wrongful life
- Voluntary Human Extinction Movement
- Yogyakarta Principles
- History of medicine in the United States
