= Legal status of human sterilization by country =

Laws regarding sterilization for contraceptive purposes around the world: Legal from the age of 18 Legal from the age of 21, 25 or 18 for those with two children Legal from the age of 25 Legal from the age of 30, 35 or 40 Legal for those with at least 3, 4 or 5 children sometimes with additional age requirements Illegal No data

Forced sterilization of people with disabilities in Europe Forced sterilization is allowed for minors Forced sterilization is allowed Forced sterilization is prohibited No data

Forced sterilization laws in the United States Forced sterilization is allowed Status of forced sterilization is unclear Forced sterilization is prohibited

This article provides an overview of human sterilization by country. While many countries permit voluntary sterilization for contraceptive purposes, some permit it only for medical or eugenic purposes. Additional restrictions may include minimum age, parental or spousal consent.

| Country | Voluntary for contraceptive purposes | Compulsory | Notes |
|---|---|---|---|
| Andorra | Yes | | Since 1996 |
| Argentina | Yes | | As of 2009 |
| Australia | Yes | | Since 1977 |
| Austria | Yes | Illegal | 25+ years for contraceptive purposes. Since 1974 |
| (The Bahamas) Bahamas | Yes | | As of 2009 |
| Bangladesh | Yes | For refugees | |
| Belarus | Yes | | 35+years or at least two children |
| Belgium | | Illegal | |
| Belize | Yes | | As of 2009 |
| Botswana | Yes | | |
| Brazil | Yes | Illegal in most cases, although both the US and Brazilian governments have carried out sterilisation of Brazilians in the 20th and 21st centuries under various rationales | 21+ years or <21 with two children for contraceptive purposes. Since 2022 |
| Bulgaria | | Legal | |
| Canada | Yes | Legal | Since 1979. Sterilisations particularly of indigenous individuals performed in the 20th and 21st centuries. Ban proposed in 2024. |
| Cape Verde | Yes | | As of 2009 |
| Chile | Yes | | Since 2001 |
| China | Yes | De jure illegal | |
| Colombia | Yes | | Since 1984 |
| Comoros | Yes | | As of 2009 |
| Costa Rica | Yes | | Since 1999 |
| (Ivory Coast) Côte d'Ivoire | Yes | | As of 2009 |
| Croatia | Yes | Legal | 35+ for contraceptive purposes. Since 1978 |
| Cuba | Yes | | 32+ years with several children for contraceptive purposes. Since 1968 |
| Cyprus | | Legal | |
| Czech Republic | Yes | Legal | 21+ years for contraceptive reasons. Since 2012 |
| Denmark | Yes | Legal | 25+ years for contraceptive reasons. Since 1976 |
| Dominican Republic | Yes | | 40+ years with one child, 35+ with three children, 30+ with five children or 25+ with six children for contraceptive purposes. Since 1972 |
| Ecuador | Yes | | 25+ years with three children for contraceptive purposes. Since 1992 |
| El Salvador | Yes | | Since 1979 |
| Estonia | Yes | Legal | 35+years or at least 3 children. Since 1998 |
| Fiji | Yes | | |
| Finland | Yes | Legal | 30+ years or <30 years and three children for contraceptive purposes. Since 1985 |
| France | Yes | Illegal | Since 2001 |
| (Georgia (country)) Georgia | Yes | | As of 2009 |
| Germany | Yes | Illegal | |
| Ghana | Yes | | |
| Greece | | | |
| Guatemala | No | | |
| Honduras | Yes | | 35+ years with one child or 24–43 with three children for contraceptive purposes. |
| Hungary | Yes | Legal | 40+ years or three children |
| Iceland | Yes | Only for medical reasons | 25+ years for contraceptive purposes. Forced sterilizations banned since 2019 except for medical reasons. |
| India | Yes | | 20+ (women) or 25+ (men) years for contraceptive purposes, less if couple has two children. Spousal consent and has to have had one child that is a year old |
| Indonesia | Yes | | |
| Iran | No | | In 2021 sterilization was prohibited except for medical purposes. |
| (Republic of Ireland) Ireland | | Illegal | |
| Israel | Yes | | |
| Italy | Yes | Illegal | |
| Japan | No | Illegal (since 1996) | In practice, contraceptive sterilizations are performed routinely, with health reasons given as the justification. Forced sterilization carried out between 1948 and 1996. |
| Kenya | Yes | | |
| Kyrgyzstan | Yes | | |
| Latvia | | Legal | |
| Lesotho | Yes | | |
| Liechtenstein | Yes | | 25+ years for contraceptive purposes. |
| Lithuania | No | Legal | |
| Luxembourg | Yes | | |
| Mali | Yes | | As of 2009 |
| Malaysia | No | | According to 1981 fatwa sterilization is forbidden for men and women. Temporary contraceptive methods may be permitted for health and economic reasons. |
| Malta | | Illegal | |
| Mexico | Yes | | |
| Moldova | Yes | | As of 2009 |
| Monaco | | | |
| Mongolia | Yes | | Woman must have many children |
| Montenegro | | | |
| Morocco | Yes | | As of 2009 |
| Myanmar | No | | Since 1963 |
| Namibia | Yes | | As of 2009 |
| Nepal | Yes | | |
| Netherlands | Yes | Illegal | |
| New Zealand | Yes | | |
| Nicaragua | Yes | | |
| Niger | Yes | | 35+ years with four children for contraceptive purposes. |
| Nigeria | Yes | | |
| North Macedonia | Yes | | As of 2009 |
| Norway | Yes | | 25+ years for contraceptive purposes |
| Pakistan | Yes | | |
| Panama | Yes | | Five children for contraceptive purposes. |
| Paraguay | Yes | | |
| Peru | Yes | | |
| Philippines | Yes | | |
| Poland | No | Illegal | Reproductive sterilisation of men (vasectomy) is legal in Poland, while other sterilization methods have been defined as a criminal act since 1997 and remains so as of 5 September 2019, under Article 156 §1, which also covers making someone blind, deaf or mute, of the 1997 law. The original 1997 law punished contraventions with a prison sentence of one to ten years and the updated law as of 5 September 2019 sets a prison sentence of at least 3 years. The prison sentence is a maximum of three years if the sterilisation is involuntary, under Art. 156 §2. |
| Portugal | Yes | Legal | 25+ years for contraceptive purposes. |
| Romania | Yes | | |
| Russia | Yes | | 35+ years or <35 with two children. |
| Singapore | Yes | | |
| Slovenia | Yes | Illegal | 35+ years for contraceptive purposes |
| Rwanda | No | | |
| Saudi Arabia | No | | |
| Senegal | Yes | | As of 2009 |
| (Slovakia) Slovak Republic | Yes | Legal | As of 2009 |
| South Africa | Yes | | |
| South Korea | Yes | | Since 1973 |
| Spain | Yes | Illegal | |
| Sri Lanka | Yes | | |
| Sudan | No | | Since 1990 |
| Sweden | Yes | Illegal | 25+ years for contraceptive purposes; 18–25 for eugenic, health (women only) or sex change reasons. |
| Switzerland | Yes | Illegal | See Human sterilization in Switzerland |
| Taiwan | Yes | | Since 1984 |
| Tanzania | Yes | | |
| Thailand | Yes | | |
| Trinidad and Tobago | Yes | | |
| Tunisia | Yes | | Since 1973. At least four children required. |
| Turkey | Yes | | Since 1983 |
| Uganda | Yes | | Since 1993 |
| United Arab Emirates | No | | Women can opt for sterilisation if they have had "any medical illness that could endanger their life in future due to pregnancy". |
| United Kingdom | Yes | | |
| United States | Yes | Varies by state | |
| Uruguay | Yes | | As of 2009 |
| Venezuela | No | | Since 1971 |
| Vietnam | Yes | | Since 1989 |
| Zambia | Yes | | Since 1965 |
| Zimbabwe | Yes | | Since 1985 |

== See also ==
- compulsory sterilization § By country
