= Family Nature Summit =

Family Nature Summits are annual gatherings that offer a mix of environmental and outdoor education and adventure, with notable environmental and wildlife educators providing classes and activities for adults and children. Called "Conservation Summits" until 2000, the National Wildlife Federation (NWF) held the first Summit (a harbinger of present day ecotourism and green living trends) on July 20–25, 1970, at the YMCA of the Rockies, Rocky Mountain National Park, Colorado. There have been 119 Summits since 1970, with notable environmental educators, naturalists, authors and artists such as Robert Michael Pyle, Jim Halfpenny, Clare Walker Leslie, Roger Tory Peterson, Annie Tiberio Cameron, Steve Torbit, and Craig Tufts serving as faculty at many of the Summits. The organization's objectives focus on entertaining educational nature programming for youth, teens, and young adults, led by nationally recognized environmental educators such as Steve Houser, recipient of the 2009 Edward C. Roy, Jr. Award For Excellence in K-8 Earth Science Teaching.

Summits have been held in Alaska, California, Michigan, West Virginia, Maine, New York, Colorado, Utah, three Canadian provinces, and elsewhere. In 2006, dozens of longtime Summiteers formed a non-profit corporation to take over the project from NWF. Family Summits, Inc. has produced Family Nature Summits since then as an independent organization, in Black Mountain, North Carolina in 2007; at Mount Hood, Oregon, in 2008; at the YMCA of the Adirondacks in Silver Bay, New York, in 2009; in the Sierra Nevada near Tahoe City, California, on Lake Tahoe in 2010 and 2017; near Potosi, Missouri, at the YMCA of the Ozarks in 2011. In 2012, a Summit was held again at the inaugural Summit site near Rocky Mountain National Park at the YMCA of the Rockies near Estes Park, Colorado, and the following year at Acadia National Park on Mount Desert Island, Maine. In 2014 one was held at the Asilomar Conference Grounds on California's Monterey Peninsula, the site of Summits from 1973–1975 and 1992–1993. In 2015, the Summit was at Lake Junaluska and the adjacent Great Smoky Mountains National Park. In 2016, the event was at Ghost Ranch near Abiquiú in northern New Mexico, and in 2018 in the White Mountains of New Hampshire and Maine near Bethel, Maine. For 2019, the Grand Traverse Bay-Lake Michigan region of northwestern lower Michigan hosted the event. After 2020-21 coronavirus cancellations, the 2022 event was at the Humboldt State University redwoods area of Northern California, 2023 in central Minnesota. The July 6-12, 2024 gathering was at Arizona's Saguaro National Park half an hour from the 6,000 to 9,000 foot Catalina Mountains. The New River Gorge National Park and Preserve in West Virginia hosted the July 19-25, 2025 event. From August 1 to 6, 2026, the Summit was held at Custer State Park in the Black Hills of South Dakota. The Green Mountains and Stowe, Vermont will host the July 10 to 16, 2027 event.
