= Zoobooks =

American children's magazine

- Frequency: 9 per year
- Founded: 1980
- Company: National Wildlife Federation
- Country: United States
- Based in: Reston, Virginia
- Language: English
- Website: rangerrick.org/magazines/zoobooks/
- ISSN: 0737-9005

Zoobooks is an animal-focused publication for children. Each issue of Zoobooks covers a different animal or group of animals with pictures, educational diagrams, facts, and games. Zoobooks also has available online content to further explore the text.

The Zoobooks brand had different content subscriptions depending on age, with Zoobooks being for children 8+, Zoodinos for ages 5+, Zootles for ages 4–8, and Zoobies for ages 0–3. These titles have been discontinued.

== History ==
Zoobooks was founded in 1980. In 2018, Zoobooks was acquired by the National Wildlife Federation, publisher of Ranger Rick magazine, and rebranded as Ranger Rick Zoobooks. Charles R. Schroeder, D.V.M., Director Emeritus San Diego Zoo and San Diego Wild Animal Park, was the zoological consultant for all of the Zoobooks, along with other more specialized researchers for every different issue.

== List of Zoobooks by alphabetical order ==
The following is a list of all Zoobooks in alphabetical order:

- Alligators & Crocodiles - 1984, January 1987, December 1990, September 1995, July 2000 & 2005
- Animal All Stars (Previously Animal Champions 2) - 1986, May 1990, February 1995, December 1999, 2004 & 2009, September 2015
- Animal Babies (Previously Baby Animals) - 1981, September 1991, May 1996, 2001, 2006 & 2011
- Animal Babies 2 (Previously Baby Animals 2) - November 1989, August 1994, April 1999, 2004 & December 2008
- Animal Champions - January 1984, December 1988, September 1993, May 1998, 2003, January 2008, & October 2013
- Animal Wonders - 1983, August 1988, April 1993, January 1998, 2002 & 2007
- Apes - 1981, July 1991, December 1996, 2001 & 2006
- Bats - December 1989, September 1994, May 1999, 2004, October 2008, & September 2014
- Bears - 1982, March 1986, October 1991, June 1996, 2001, 2005 & 2011
- Big Cats - 1981, March 1992, November 1996, July 2001, 2006 & 2011
- Birds of Prey - 1980, August 1991, April 1996, February 2001, 2005 & 2011
- Butterflies - June 1990, March 1995, January 2000 & 2004, April 2016
- Camels - 1984, November 1986, October 1989, July 1994, March 1999, January 2004, November 2008, & January 2015
- Cheetahs - August 1990, May 1995, March 2000, 2005 & 2009, November 2015
- Chimpanzees - February 1990, November 1994, July 1999, 2004, 2009, & October 2014
- City Animals - June 1987, May 1991, November 1999, 2004 & 2009, April 2015
- Deer Family, The (previously Deer, Moose & Elk) - 1985, January 1988, October 1992, June 1997, 2002 & 2007
- Dinosaurs - 1985, December 1987, September 1992, June 1999, 2004 & 2009, December 2014
- Dolphins & Porpoises - March 1990, December 1994, September 1999, 2004 & 2009
- Ducks, Geese & Swans - March 1984, September 1986, March 1989, December 1993, August 1998, June 2003, April 2008, & January 2014
- Eagles - December 1985, July 1988, May 1993, December 1997, October 2002, July 2007, & March 2013
- Elephants - 1980 (first issue of Zoobooks), 1986, 1995, 1996, 1999, 2004 & July/August 2010
- Endangered Animals - 1983, July 1986, October 1996, 2001, 2006 & 2011
- Giraffes - 1982, May 1986, December 1991, August 1996, 2001, 2006 & 2011
- Gorillas - April 1987, March 1991, December 1995, 2001, 2005 & December 2010
- Hippos - July 1989, April 1994, November 1998, 2003, June 2008, & March 2014
- Hummingbirds - July 1987, June 1991, March 1996, January 2001 & 2005
- Insects - April 1984, October 1986, April 1989, January 1994, September 1998, 2003 & May 2008
- Insects 2 - May 1984, November 1986, May 1989, February 1994, February 1999, 2003 & September 2008
- Kangaroos - April 1990, January 1995, October 1999, 2004 & 2009, June 2015
- Koalas & Other Australian Animals - 1983, June 1988, March 1993, November 1997, 2002 & 2007
- Lions - June 1989, March 1994, October 1998, 2003 & March 2008
- Little Cats - 1983, April 1986, October 1988, July 1993, March 1998, 2003, 2007 & April 2013
- Nocturnal (Night) Animals - August 1984, February 1987, January 1991, October 1995, August 2000, 2005 & November 2010
- Old World Monkeys - October 1990, July 1995, May 2000, 2005 & 2010, January 2016
- Orangutans - 1981, February 1996, 2000, 2005 & 2011
- Ostriches and other Ratites - January 1990, October 1994, August 1999, 2004 & 2009, February 2015
- Owls - 1985, September 1987, March 1997, 2002 & 2006
- Pandas - February 1984, August 1986, February 1989, November 1993, July 1998, 2003 & February 2008
- Parrots - 1984, March 1987, February 1991, November 1995, 2000, 2005 & 2010, February 2016
- Penguins - December 1983, November 1988, August 1993, April 1998 & 2007, September 2013
- Polar Bears - May 1985, November 1987, August 1992, May 1997, 2002 & 2006
- Rattlesnakes - August 1989, May 1994, December 1998, July 2008, & April 2014
- Rhinos - 1984, May 1987, April 1991, January 1996, 2000, 2005 & 2011
- Sea Otters - November 1990, August 1995, June 2000 & 2005, December 2015
- Seabirds - July 1990, April 1995, February 2000, 2004 & 2009, August 2015
- Seals & Seal Lions (Previously Seals, Sea Lions & Walruses) - 1985, August 1987, February 1997, 2001 & 2006
- Sharing the World with Animals (Previously Saving our Animal Friends) - September 1990, June 1995 & April 2000
- Sharks - June 1983, September 1988, June 1993, February 1998 & 2007, June 2013
- Skunks Family, The (Previously Skunks, Otters & Other Mustelids) - 1985, February 1988, November 1992, July 1997, May 2002 & 2007
- Snakes - 1981, January 1997, 2001 & 2006
- Spiders - 1985, March 1988, December 1992, August 1997, 2002 & 2007
- Tigers - 1985, October 1987, July 1992, April 1997, 2002 & 2006
- Turtles (Previously Turtles & Tortoises) - 1985, May 1988, February 1993, October 1997, August 2002 & 2007
- Whales - 1983, June 1986, September 1996, 2001, 2006 & 2011
- Wild Dogs - 1985, April 1988, January 1993, September 1997, March 2002 & 2007
- Wild Horses -(Previously called Horses?) - 1982, November 1985, April 1986, November 1991, July 1996, 2001, 2006 & 2011
- Wolves - June 1984, July 1986, January 1989, October 1993, June 1998, April 2003, 2007, & August 2013
- Zebras - September 1989, June 1994, January 1999, 2003, August 2008, June 2014

== Awards ==
Ranger Rick Zoobooks have received nomination and recognition for several awards.

- Parent's Choice Foundation Awards:
  - Parent's Choice Foundation Gold (2007-2009)
- Academic's Choice Smart Book Award Winner 2019
