= Discovering Endangered Wildlife =

1995 video game

- Developer: Lyriq International
- Publisher: Global Software Publishing
- Platform: Windows
- Release: 1995

Discovering Endangered Wildlife, also known as David Bellamy's Endangered Wildlife, is a 1995 video game from Lyriq International. It was developed in cooperation with the National Wildlife Federation and is for ages 8 and up.

== Gameplay ==
Discovering Endangered Wildlife is an educational CD-ROM intended for middle-school students, inviting them to explore the issues surrounding endangered species. It offers interactive learning through full-motion video, digitized sound effects, and 256-color super VGA graphics. Players engage with multimedia-rich content designed to illuminate the threats, environmental challenges, and solutions affecting wildlife. The gameplay revolves around immersive exploration and discovery, presenting ecological information in a format that encourages curiosity and critical thinking. A portion of each purchase supported the National Wildlife Federation.

== Development ==
The game was developed by Lyriq International, a company founded in 1991 in Cheshire. It was showcased at the Winter Consumer Electronics Show in Las Vegas.

== Reception ==
Reception

Review scores
Publication	Score
Electronic Games	A
Electronic Entertainment	4/5
Philadelphia Daily News	2/4
The Observer	4/5

Philadelphia Daily News said "The text is generous in volume and in scope, and the photos are decent, but this Windows-only program just feels flat."

Electronic Games said "This program is suitable for the entire family and successfully teaches concern along with the names, using outstanding photography along the way"
