= Backyard Wildlife Habitat =

American ecological program

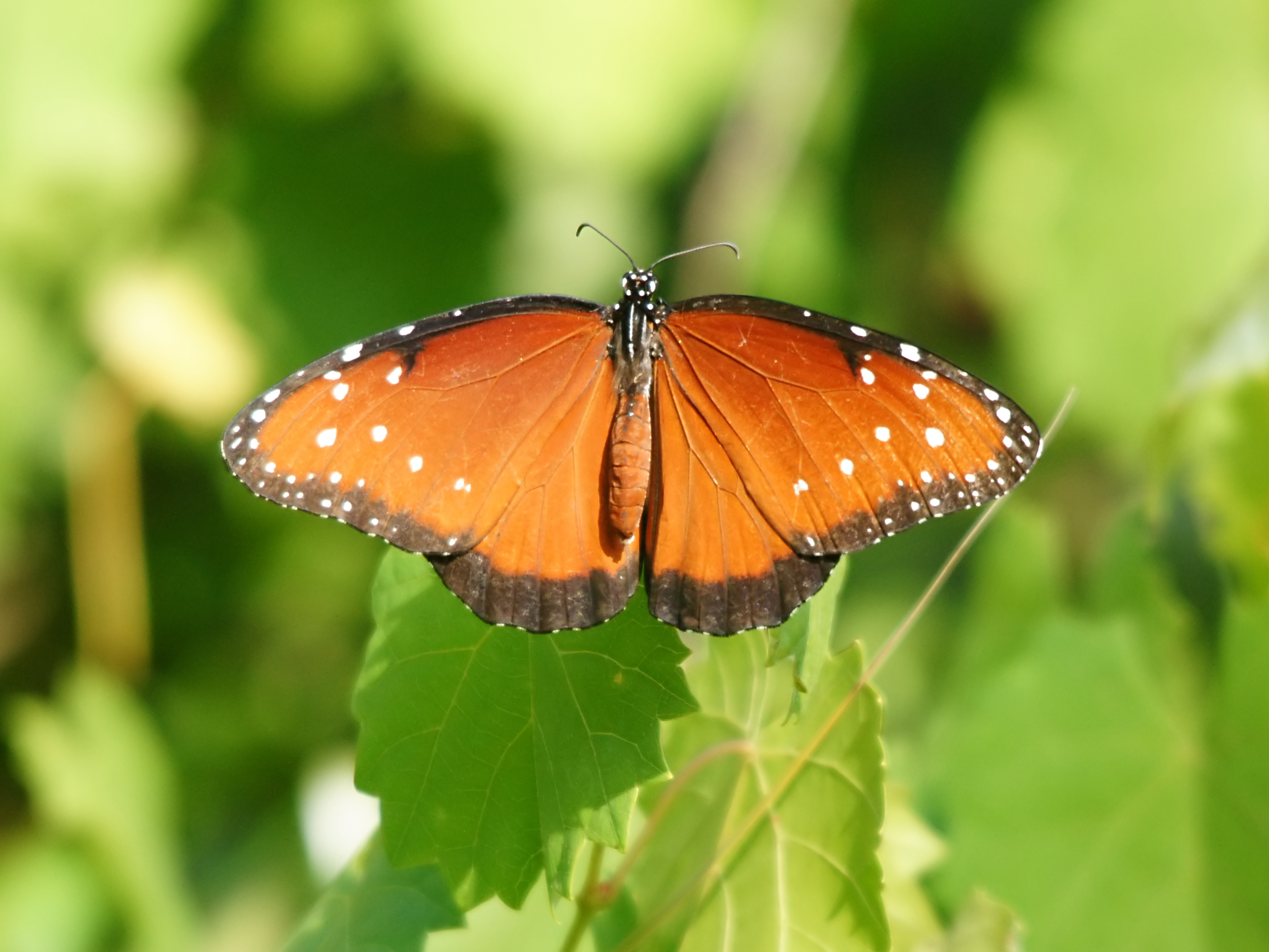
Queen butterfly in Florida

The Backyard Wildlife Habitat is a program of the National Wildlife Federation that encourages homeowners in the United States to manage their gardens and yards as a wildlife garden, with the goal of maintaining healthy and diverse animal habitats and ecosystems. The program began in 1973. By 1998, it had impacted more than 21,000 yards and, as of 2006, has certified over 60,000 'backyards'.

== Certification ==
To be a certified Backyard Wildlife Habitat, a garden or yard, or any outdoor space from a balcony up to a multi-acre tract of land, must offer food, water, shelter, and a place for raising young to beneficial insects or animals. Over time the Federation has introduced variants or expansions of the program for schoolyards and for communities.

In order for a backyard to be certified as a Backyard Wildlife Habitat by the National Wildlife Federation, the space must do all of the following: provide food, water, cover, a place to raise young, and be maintained in a way that has a positive effect on the health of the soil, air, water, and habitat for native wildlife. More specifically, the presence of native forbs, shrubs, and trees is necessary to provide food. Water can be supplied by natural features such as a streams, ponds, or wetlands, or by human-made features such as bird baths. Native vegetation can also provide cover and places for wildlife to raise their young, as can brush piles or dead trees. With all of these features in place, it is crucial that the land be cared for thoughtfully and as naturally as possible. Avoid the use of chemical pesticides and fertilizers, reduce the area that turf grass occupies, utilize mulch obtained from sustainable forestry practices, and minimize water use in order to maintain the integrity of the soil, air, and water in and outside of the habitat.

== Effectiveness and success ==
Backyard habitats that focus on native plants and increasing plant diversity have been shown, in studies from 2008 and 2021, to provide better quality environments for bees and birds.

A study published in 2004 of the effect on Battus philenor in the San Francisco area found that gardens where the host plants were more than 40 years old, the gardens were as good as natural sites, and where the host plants were less than eight years old the species was unlikely to visit. In between these plant ages, butterflies laid eggs but these had an inferior survival rate.

Although no scientific study has been done that has studied Certified Wildlife Habitats, as defined above, specifically in terms of increased native biodiversity, extensive investigation has been made into the biodiversity benefits of using native plants in suburban and urban native landscapes in general. An article published in Conservation Biology addresses the need to enhance the habitat value of suburban and urban spaces, which have been identified as a primary cause of decline in many threatened or endangered species, and promotes these areas as having potential for social and educational value as well. The author asserts that using a more balanced approach to conservation biology that addresses more densely populated areas, rather than one that focuses mainly on relatively undisturbed areas, can help to mitigate effects of human land use.

== Native plants use ==
One study that was published in Conservation Biology reported that native plants supported more species of moths and butterflies than introduced plants. Another study, which studied species richness and diversity of small mammals, recommended planting native trees along riparian zone stream corridors in order to promote more diversity of small mammals in suburban and urban parks after finding populations resembling natural conditions in parks managed for passive recreation as compared to those containing manicured habitats surrounded by human-modified landscapes. A second study compared properties landscaped with entirely native plants with those containing a mix of native and non-native plants. Results showed that the native properties supported significantly higher species richness and diversity of caterpillars and birds, as well as greater numbers of breeding pairs and biomass of native species.

== See also ==
- Landscape ecology
- Natural landscaping
- Sustainable landscaping
- Sustainable gardening
- Restoration ecology
- Habitat Network
