= Berkeley Journal of International Law =

- Discipline: International law
- Language: English

Publication details
- Former names: International Tax & Business Lawyer
- History: 1982-present
- Publisher: UC Berkeley School of Law (United States)
- Frequency: Biannual

Standard abbreviations
- Bluebook: Berkeley J. Int'l L.
- ISO 4: Berkeley J. Int. Law

Indexing
- ISSN: 1085-5718

Links
- Journal homepage

The Berkeley Journal of International Law is an academic journal covering international law. It is run and edited by students at UC Berkeley School of Law. It was established in 1982 as the International Tax & Business Lawyer.

The journal publishes articles on public and private international law and comparative law. It also publishes reviews of new books in the field.

As of 2018, the Berkeley Journal of International Law was the 26th most cited international law journal in the United States, according to the W&L Law Journal Rankings.

The journal publishes two issues per year and on its website also publishes the Publicist, "an online-only journal that allows for faster publication of ideas in a shorter and more accessible format than the traditional printed Law Review."

The journal hosts the Stefan A. Riesenfeld Symposium, where scholars and practitioners address important international legal issues.
