= Robert Michael Pyle =

American lepidopterist, writer, and teacher

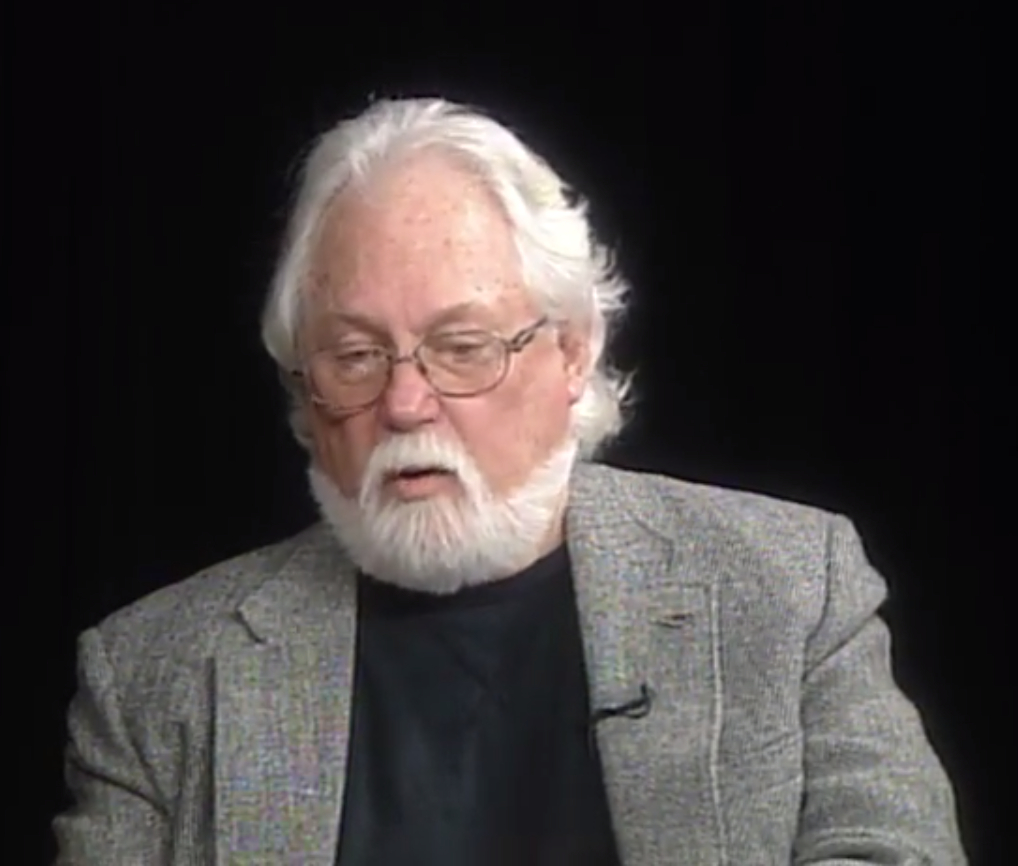
- Pyle in 2013
- Born: July 19, 1947 (age 79); Denver, Colorado, US
- Education: Yale School of Forestry & Environmental Studies
- Occupations: Lepidopterist, writer, professor

Robert Michael Pyle (born 19 July 1947) is an American lepidopterist, writer, teacher, and founder of the Xerces Society for Invertebrate Conservation. Much of his life story is told in the 2020 feature film The Dark Divide, where Pyle is played by David Cross.

== Early life and education ==
Pyle grew up in Denver and Aurora, Colorado, and completed his early education in Aurora Public Schools, graduating in 1965. He attended the University of Washington, where he received a B.S. degree in "Nature Perception and Protection" in a self-styled General Studies program. This was followed by an M.S. in Nature Interpretation from the UW College of Forest Resources. During his time there he was also involved in environmental activism, serving on the university Conservation Council and testifying against unsustainable development plans.

A Fulbright Scholarship in 1971-72 enabled Pyle to study butterfly conservation at the Monks Wood Experimental Station in Abbot's Ripton, England, with John Heath and other mentors, which led to his founding of the Xerces Society in 1971. From there he entered Yale University Graduate School to study insect conservation ecology with Charles Remington. He received his Ph.D. ("The Eco-geography of Lepidoptera Conservation") from the Yale School of Forestry & Environmental Studies in 1976.

On July 30, 1966, he married his high school sweetheart JoAnne R. Clark, who was also a student of biology. They divorced amicably in 1973, and he married botanist Sally Hughes on June 7, 1974. This second marriage would last a decade. He married Thea Linnaea Peterson Hellyer (a botanist and silk-screen artist) on October 19, 1985. She died of ovarian cancer on November 20, 2013. In 2022, Pyle's New Riverside Press published Part of Me: Poems and Other Writings of Thea Linnaea Pyle.

== Career ==
=== Conservation biology and research ===
Pyle worked as ranger-naturalist in Sequoia National Park, butterfly conservation consultant for the Wildlife Division of Papua New Guinea, Northwest Land Steward for The Nature Conservancy, and co-manager of the Species Conservation Monitoring Center in Cambridge, UK, where he co-compiled the IUCN Invertebrate Red Data Book. He has been deeply involved in Monarch butterfly conservation since 1975, convening the First Conference on Monarch Conservation and biology in Morelos, Mexico, and chairing The Monarch Project of the Xerces Society with Lincoln Brower and Melody Mackey Allen. He has also been active in old-growth forest conservation in the Pacific Northwest. These involvements continue. Pyle has published many papers on butterfly conservation ecology and biogeography, and he continues fieldwork as Co-coordinator of the Washington Butterfly Survey. He co-authored (with Paul Hammond) a major paper reviewing the Mariposa Copper butterfly (Lycaena mariposa) and describing nine new subspecies. His most recent paper reports on the behavior of the Woodland Skipper (Ochlodes sylvanoides) during a total eclipse of the sun. Ongoing studies concern forty years of monitoring butterfly phenology at one study site and the biology of a northerly migrant species, both pertaining to climate change.

=== Teaching and speaking ===
Pyle has taught writing, conservation biology, and natural history seminars at many colleges and institutes worldwide, and has delivered hundreds of invited lectures and keynote addresses. He has served as Visiting Professor of Environmental Writing at Utah State University; as Kittredge Distinguished Visiting Writer at the University of Montana; and as place-based writing instructor for the Aga Khan Humanities Project in Tajikistan and the Writers' Centre of Tasmania.

On twenty-five occasions from 1976 to 2013, he presented and led field trips at the annual week-long National Wildlife Federation Conservation Summits and their successors, Family Nature Summits. He has also led natural history seminars for Cloud Ridge Naturalists, the North Cascades, Olympic Park, and Glacier Park Institutes, and in numerous other settings.

He has served on the faculty of the Sitka Institute, Fishtrap, Haystack, Art of the Wild, Breadloaf, and many other writers' conferences and events and has led natural history tours for the National Audubon Society, the Smithsonian Institution, the Wilderness Society, the Arizona Sonora Desert Museum, and The Nature Conservancy, and Green & Pleasant Tours ("Birds and Beers of Britain") among others.

=== Writing ===
Since 1982, Pyle has been an independent scholar, writer, and biologist, concentrating on writing as his primary professional activity. He writes essay, poetry, and fiction from his home along a tributary of the Lower Columbia River in Southwest Washington, where he has lived since 1978. He has published 24 books and hundreds of essays, papers, poems, stories, and anthology chapters.

Pyle's seminal work, Wintergreen: Rambles in a Ravaged Land, describes the devastation caused by unrestrained logging as well as the remaining beauties of his adopted home in the Willapa Hills. His book Where Bigfoot Walks: Crossing the Dark Divide grew out of a Guggenheim Fellowship, and was a major component (along with Pyle's other books) for the 2020 feature film The Dark Divide starring David Cross as Pyle and Debra Messing as his wife Thea Linnaea Pyle. The Thunder Tree: Lessons from An Urban Wildland chronicles the intersection of his Aurora, Colorado, boyhood nature explorations and Colorado's long tradition of water rights battles with the importance of everyone's special places, especially children's. Both Wintergreen and The Thunder Tree exemplify Pyle's love of damaged lands.

His travel narrative Chasing Monarchs: Migrating with the Butterflies of Passage traces his discovery of previously unsuspected monarch butterfly migration patterns. Mariposa Road: The First Butterfly Big Year follows up as another far-ranging butterfly road trip narrative, as it chronicles Pyle's coast-to-coast adventures and misadventures while documenting as many butterflies as possible in one year (similar to a birder's big year). Pyle co-edited and annotated Nabokov’s Butterflies, which collects the novelist's butterfly writings from throughout his literary and scientific opus.

Walking the High Ridge: Life as Field Trip reflects on Pyle's development as a writer and on his sources, influences, and beliefs. Sky Time in Gray's River: Living for Keeps in a Forgotten Place follows the lives of the creatures populating his adopted village month by month through the seasons.

A chapbook of poems and stories, Letting the Flies Out, preceded Pyle's first full-length book of poems, Evolution of the Genus Iris. His second book of poems, Chinook and Chanterelle, features cover art by his wife, the late artist and naturalist Thea Linnaea Pyle. Pyle's third longer collection, The Tidewater Reach: Field Guide to the Lower Columbia River in Poems and Pictures, is a collaboration with photographer Judy VanderMaten.

Other books include The Audubon Society Field Guide to North American Butterflies, The Butterfly Watcher's Handbook, The Butterflies of Cascadia, and The Butterflies of the Pacific Northwest

Magdalena Mountain: A Novel, Pyle's first published book of fiction, weaves a converging tale of disparate personalities brought into the high country of Colorado mountain wilderness by their various quests for the all-black Magdalena alpine butterfly. The book seeks to blend methods of narrative natural history writing with pure fiction by alternating chapters on Magdalena's life in the high rocks with those of the human characters.

Pyle's essays have been collected in three books: The Tangled Bank, his columns from fifty-two consecutive issues of Orion and Orion Afield magazines; Through a Green Lens: Fifty Years of Writing for Nature; and Nature Matrix: New and Selected Essays (September 2020).

Butterfly Launches from Spar Pole, a collaboration of Pyle with Nirvana bassist Krist Novoselic and Ray Prestegard, is an eleven-track audio album of acoustic song-poems inspired by the natural world.

== Awards and honors ==
- 2022: Conservation Award, Royal Entomological Society
- 2021: Pen America Diamonstein-Spielvogel Award for the Art of the Essay (finalist), Nature Matrix: New and Collected Essays
- 2020: Fellow, Entomological Society of America
- 2018: National Outdoor Book Award, Butterflies of the Pacific Northwest
- 2014: Life appointment as Honorary Fellow, Royal Entomological Society
- 2011: Washington State Book Award (finalist) in the biography/memoir category, Mariposa Road: The First Butterfly Big Year
- 2008: Washington State Book Award (finalist) for general nonfiction, Sky Time in Grays River: Living for Keeps in a Forgotten Place
- 2008: National Outdoor Book Award in the natural history literature category, Sky Time in Gray's River: Living for Keeps in a Forgotten Place
- 2008: Distinguished Alumnus Award, Yale University Schools of Forestry & Environmental Studies
- 2007: Distinguished Alumnus Award, University of Washington College of Forest Resources
- 2002: Harry Nehls Award for Nature Writers, "momentous recent work", Portland Audubon Society
- 2000: Washington Governor's Book Award, Chasing Monarchs
- 1997: Society for Conservation Biology Distinguished Service Award
- 1989: John Simon Guggenheim Fellowship, Where Bigfoot Walks: Crossing the Dark Divide
- 1987: Washington Governor's Book Award, Wintergreen
- 1987: Pacific Northwest Booksellers Association Award, Wintergreen
- 1987: John Burroughs Medal for Distinguished Nature Writing, Wintergreen
- 1985: Washington Governor's Book Award, Handbook for Butterfly Watcher
- 1976: Feinstone Environmental Award (finalist)
- 1973: National Wildlife Federation Environmental Conservation Fellowship
- 1971: Fulbright Scholarship
- 1964: Colorado-Wyoming Academy of Science student research grant
- 1963: National Science Foundation, pre-college summer science award

== Sources ==
- Kuhlken, Robert. 2002. Dictionary of Literary Biography, Volume 275, Twentieth-Century American Nature Writers: Prose, pp. 261–270. Detroit: Gale.
- Pearson, Michael. 1996. American Nature Writers, Volume 2, pp. 733–739. Scribner's.

== Bibliography ==
- Nature Matrix: New and Selected Essays. 2020. Counterpoint.
- The Tidewater Reach: Field Guide to the Lower Columbia River in Poems and Pictures (with Judy VanderMaten). 2020. Columbia River Reader Press.
- Butterflies of the Pacific Northwest. With Caitlin C. LaBar. 2018. Timber Press.
- Magdalena Mountain: A Novel. 2018. Counterpoint Press.
- Through a Green Lens: Fifty Years of Writing for Nature. 2016. Oregon State University Press.
- Chinook and Chanterelle: Poems. 2016. Lost Horse Press.
- Evolution of the Genus Iris: Poems. 2014. Lost Horse Press.
- The Tangled Bank: Writings from Orion. 2012. Oregon State University Press.
- Letting the Flies Out (chapbook). 2011. Fishtrap. (Current publisher: New Riverside Press)
- Mariposa Road: The First Butterfly Big Year. 2010. Houghton Mifflin. (Current publisher: Yale University Press)
- Sky Time in Gray's River: Living for Keeps in a Forgotten Place. 2007. Houghton Mifflin. (Current publisher: Counterpoint) (out in Jan. 2021)
- The Butterflies of Cascadia: A Field Guide to All the Species of Washington, Oregon, and Surrounding Territories. 2002. Seattle Audubon Society.
- Nabokov's Butterflies. Edited and annotated by R. M. Pyle and Brian Boyd, with new translations from the Russian by Dmitri Nabokov. 2000. Beacon Press.
- Walking the High Ridge: Life as Field Trip. 2000. Milkweed Editions.
- Chasing Monarchs: Migrating with the Butterflies of Passage. 1999. Houghton Mifflin. (Current publisher: Yale University Press)
- Where Bigfoot Walks: Crossing the Dark Divide. 1995. Houghton Mifflin. (Current publisher: Counterpoint)
- The Thunder Tree: Lessons from An Urban Wildland. 1993. Houghton Mifflin. (Current publisher: Oregon State University Press)
- Insects: A Peterson Field Guide Coloring Book (with Kristin Kest and Roger Tory Peterson). 1993. Houghton Mifflin.
- Wintergreen: Rambles in a Ravaged Land.. 1986. Scribner. (Current publisher: Counterpoint)
- The Audubon Society Handbook for Butterfly Watchers. 1984. (1992 reprint: Houghton Mifflin)
- The IUCN Invertebrate Red Data Book (with Susan M. Wells and N, Mark Collins). 1983. IUCN/WWF.
- Butterflies: A Peterson Field Guide Coloring Book (with Sarah Anne Hughes and Roger Tory Peterson). 1983. Houghton Mifflin.
- The Audubon Society Field Guide to North American Butterflies. 1981. Knopf.
- Watching Washington Butterflies. 1974. Seattle Audubon Society. ISBN 978-0914516033 (text and photographs) - the first guide of its kind to use colour photographs taken exclusively in nature

== Other contributions ==
- Earth & Eros (foreword "The Earth Whispers and Croons"). 2015. White Cloud Press.
- Moral Ground: Ethical Action for a Planet in Peril (essay "Evening Falls on the Maladaptive Ape"). 2010. Trinity University Press.
- Home Ground: Language for an American Landscape (several entries). 2006. Trinity University Press.
- The Way of Natural History (essay "A Natural Histerrical Feller in an Unwondering Age"). 2010. Trinity University Press.
- Wild in the City (introduction "No vacancy" and chapter "Bright Butterflies, Big City."). 2011. Oregon State University Press.
- Nature's Fading Chorus: Classic and Contemporary Writings on Amphibians (prologue "Reflections in a Golden Eye," and chapter "Waterproof Wildlife.") 2000. Island Press.
- Facing the Lion: Writers on Life and Craft (essay "Secrets of the Talking Leaf"). 1996. Beacon Press.
- Words From the Land, Volume II (essay "A Grand Surprise"). 1995. University of Nevada Press.
- The Norton Book of Nature Writing (essay "And the Coyotes Will Lift A Leg"). 1990. Norton.
- Butterfly Gardening: Creating Summer Magic in Your Garden (afterword and chapter "Butterfly Watching Tips"). 1990; new edition, 1998. Xerces Society/Sierra Club Books.
- The Art of the Butterfly (afterword). 1990. Chronicle/Marquand.
