= Joseph Sunnen =

American businessman (1897–1979)

Joseph Sunnen (June 16, 1897–April 1979) was an American machinery manufacturer, and founder of the Sunnen Foundation.

== Biography ==
Sunnen was born in the coal mining town of Thayer, Illinois. He left school in the 7th grade to help on the family farm. At age 17, he purchased a Missouri lead mine with family savings, however, this failed and his brother Gus offered him employment in his automobile garage in Mexico, Missouri.

In 1923, at age 21, Sunnen applied for his first of nearly 100 patents, a valve lifter tool, marking the beginnings of Sunnen Company. However that same year he was nearly killed in a work explosion which burnt most of his body, and spent a year recovering. He returned to his brother's garage for employment and while in Mexico, Missouri, met and married Miss Cornelia Miller. They moved to St. Louis to pursue Sunnen's manufacturing ambitions in 1924. Joe Sunnen established his Maplewood-based firm in 1924. It has been involved in a number of charitable projects, including the transformation of the Ozarks' YMCA in 1946, and has awarded grants to various groups throughout the United States such as its approximately $75,000-$100,000 yearly grant to Catholics for a Free Choice to fund their Abortion in Good Faith series, which totaled $1,091,700 to 1995. Grants are usually awarded to organizations in the St. Louis region, with about $250,000 a year going to groups in the Maplewood-Richmond Heights area.

There, Sunnen converted a 1916 Hupmobile into a camper and set out on the road to sell 500 of his new valve lifter tools. They sold two or three tools a day until they reached Mankato, Minnesota where a large distributor of shop tools bought his remaining stock and placed an order for 1,000 additional tools. Following the trip, Sunnen returned home to build his manufacturing business around the auto engine rebuilding trade. The Sunnen Company grew to become a renowned global manufacturer of precision honing devices, and holds a position of global prominence to this day.

In 1946, Joseph Sunnen made a generous donation to the Ozarks YMCA, and subsequently formed the Sunnen Foundation for further charitable projects. Sunnen's children and grandchildren continue to use the Sunnen Foundation as a vehicle for charity, with a particular emphasis on First Amendment rights, reproductive rights, and youth services.

In 1953, he established the Sunnen Foundation, a charitable foundation, in 1953. Organizations that have received support include the Children's Advocacy Center, Child Support Network, the Missouri Botanical Garden, Operation Food Search, World Bird Sanctuary, Planned Parenthood, Epworth Children and Family Services, College for Living, Our Little Haven, and Voices for Children.

In 1957, Joseph Sunnen and his wife, Cornelia, traveled to Puerto Rico and were taken on an inspection tour of some of the poorer neighborhoods. Joseph Sunnen believed deeply that people had the right to not bring children into the world, particularly if they did not have the means to support them. He "considered it an overwhelming challenge to invent a birth-control device that would be medically acceptable, easy to sue and low in price.". He worked with The St. Louis School of Pharmacy to develop the first spermicidal foam. After testing for safety and efficacy, he approached a large pharmaceutical company about producing his product, but they showed no interest. So, in 1961, Sunnen started Emko at 411 E. Gano Avenue, just down from the main building of Sunnen Products Co.
