= Human sterilization in Switzerland =

History and regulation of human sterilization practices in Switzerland

Sterilization Act
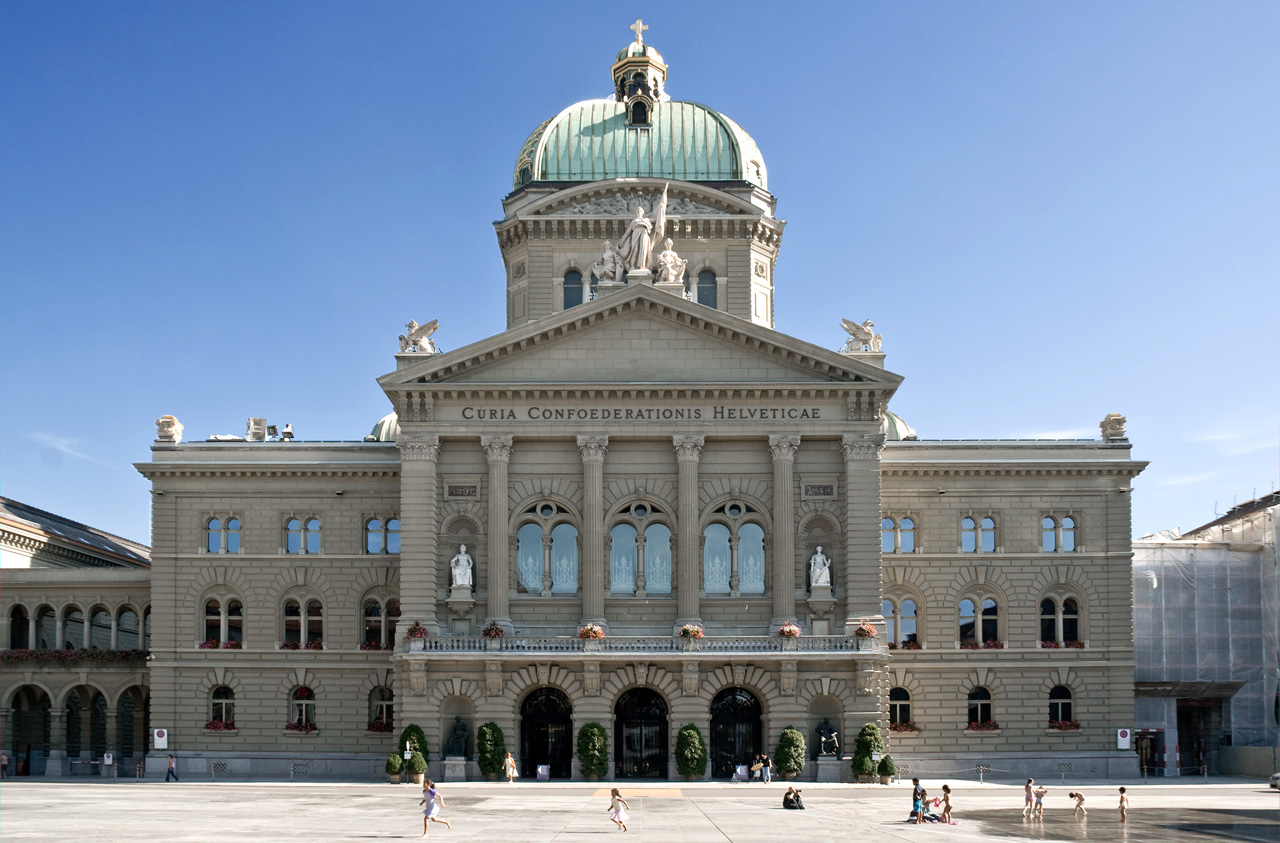

Federal Assembly of Switzerland
- Long title: Federal Act on the Conditions and Procedure Governing the Sterilization of Persons (SR 211.111.1)
- Territorial extent: Switzerland
- Enacted by: Federal Assembly of Switzerland
- Enacted: 17 December 2004
- Commenced: 1 July 2005
- Status: Current legislation

Human sterilization in Switzerland refers to the historical and contemporary practices of surgical sterilization and castration, both voluntary and forced, that have occurred in Switzerland from the early 20th century to the present. Until 1970, it is estimated that several thousand people, predominantly women, were sterilized based on psychiatric evaluations in Switzerland. These medical interventions were initially practiced in the context of emerging eugenics, social difficulties such as poverty, welfare measures, and the regulation of procreation by authorities.

Since 2005, Switzerland has regulated sterilization through federal law. The Federal Act on the Conditions and Procedure Governing the Sterilization of Persons (Sterilization Act) (Note: German: Bundesgesetz über Voraussetzungen und Verfahren bei Sterilisationen, Sterilisationsgesetz; French: Loi fédérale sur les conditions et la procédure régissant la stérilisation de personnes, Loi sur la stérilisation; Italian: Legge federale sulle condizioni e le procedure per praticare le sterilizzazioni, Legge federale sulle sterilizzazioni) permits sterilization only for adults capable of discernment who provide free and informed written consent. The sterilization of persons incapable of discernment is generally prohibited, with very limited exceptions for those over 16 years of age under strict conditions requiring approval from adult protection authorities.

== Current legal framework ==
=== Federal Act on Sterilization (2005) ===
Since 2005, Switzerland has had a comprehensive federal law governing sterilization practices. The Sterilization Act regulates the conditions under which sterilization is authorized for contraceptive purposes, as well as the applicable procedure.

The law establishes that sterilization constitutes a serious interference with physical and psychological integrity and consists of permanently suppressing a person's reproductive faculties through medical intervention. It is only authorized for adults capable of discernment who have been informed about the intervention and have freely consented in writing. The capacity for discernment plays a central role, and the physician performing the intervention must record in the medical file the elements that founded their assessment of the person's capacity for discernment.

=== Regulations for protected groups ===
The sterilization of persons aged 18 years, capable of discernment but under general guardianship, requires not only the free and written consent of the person themselves, but also that of their legal representative and the adult protection authority. The adult protection authority must also request a second medical opinion and order, if necessary, a psychiatric assessment to evaluate the capacity for discernment of the person concerned.

The sterilization of persons incapable of discernment is in principle prohibited by law. For persons over 16 years of age, exceptions are possible but only under very strict conditions (Art. 7 al. 2 Sterilization Act). These include that the intervention is performed in the interest of the person concerned, that conception and birth of a child cannot be prevented by other appropriate contraceptive methods, that conception and birth are foreseeable, and that separation from the child after birth is inevitable because parental responsibilities cannot be exercised or because pregnancy would seriously endanger the woman's health.

The adult protection authority must give its agreement to the sterilization after hearing the person concerned and their relatives, obtaining an expert report on the person and their social situation, and gathering the opinion of a psychiatric expert on the person's incapacity for discernment and the duration of this incapacity (art 3 and 7 Sterilization Act). This legal provision is considered medically difficult to apply in practice.

The National Commission for Ethics in Human Medicine published a position paper in 2025 on the sterilization of persons permanently incapable of discernment. The commission recommended several modifications to Article 7 of the sterilization law, notably so that only a danger to the health of the person concerned could justify sterilization. The commission also recommended implementing a support system for parents with intellectual disabilities and offering support and, if necessary, psychological assistance to relatives of future parents with intellectual disabilities.

=== International considerations ===
The United Nations Committee on the Rights of Persons with Disabilities indicated in 2022 that sterilization of persons with disabilities without their consent was contrary to the right to physical and psychological integrity (Article 17 of the Convention on the Rights of Persons with Disabilities).

== Historical context ==
=== Transition from castration to sterilization ===
Until the 1910s, affected individuals were sometimes castrated for eugenic reasons. Auguste Forel, director of the Burghölzli cantonal psychiatric clinic in Zürich, was considered a precursor of this practice in Europe after he had a "14-year-old hysterical girl" castrated in 1892. Surgical castrations performed from the 19th century had serious physical and psychological consequences, particularly on libido (sexuality). The less invasive technique of sterilization was developed from around 1890. Thus, when the main purpose of the intervention was to render infertile, sterilization replaced castration from the 1910s.

=== Eugenic practices ===
At the beginning of the 20th century, sterilization practices in Switzerland were closely linked to the emerging eugenics movement. Four main indications for sterilization were recognized in the 1910s. The eugenic indication aimed to prevent the "degeneration" of the "social body" (Volkskörper) and to prevent procreation by people with "heavy heredity." The social indication included both contraceptive sterilizations desired by the person themselves and "emergency sterilizations" performed on people without "loaded heredity" but who were poor and often dependent on assistance, in order to avoid additional costs for public authorities.

Psychiatric indications were established by experts for public health and prophylactic reasons, to avoid mental illness (or its aggravation) following a pregnancy. Medical indications (somatic, in the strict sense) aimed to prevent physical illness (or its aggravation) following pregnancy.

Only the canton of Vaud had a law from 1928 authorizing forced sterilizations motivated by eugenics, but only upon request of the Cantonal Public Health Service and only for people with mental disorders or incurable psychiatric diseases who, in all likelihood, would have descendants with "sick heredity."

=== Transition from eugenics ===
Initially, eugenic motivations were prevalent, but from the mid-1920s, psychiatrists generally recommended sterilization following a request for abortion, for essentially social and health reasons. In such situations, the formal consent of women went hand in hand with de facto coercion, since pregnancy termination was only prescribed if they agreed to be sterilized at the same time.

In various institutional settings, the majority of sterilizations legalized by a psychiatrist involved some form of systematic coercion, at least until 1945. Formal consent was often obtained under conditions. However, case analyses reveal that women under systematic pressure did not always view their consent as forced. Some married women who wished to abort considered sterilization desirable when they already had several children and suffered from constant fear of pregnancy, poor health, and difficult living conditions due to insufficient contraceptive means. In contrast, single women generally felt their consent had been forced and suffered from sterility because it went against their aspiration to procreate.

==== Castration ====
At the beginning of the 20th century, castration moved out of its eugenic context and, from the 1920s, was generally applied only to men. The objective of the intervention was to reduce sexual drive in cases of repeated sexual delinquency, such as child abuse, exhibitionism, and "unnatural fornication," which included male homosexuality.

Like sterilization, this intervention was not regulated by law; the prerequisites for the operation were formal consent and a therapeutic motive, as well as professional care. Interventions were carried out based on psychiatric assessments, in collaboration with the justice system and other involved authorities. The objective was to modify personality to avoid recidivism and thus obtain impunity and social integration. Those affected had the choice between deprivation of liberty and castration.

Until the early 1970s (when chemical castration became possible), surgical castration served as a prophylactic measure in criminal policy. The extent of this measure has not yet been quantified precisely. According to studies conducted to date and follow-up examinations, at least 500 to 800 men were affected.

=== Regional differences ===
Studies conducted on various Swiss cantons reveal significant regional differences in sterilization practices. Catholic and rural regions appear to have practiced significantly fewer sterilizations, particularly in the cantons of Fribourg and Valais. In contrast, in urban regions, it was mainly the demand for abortion by women that marked psychiatric sterilization practices from the mid-1920s to the mid-1950s.

In the canton of Zürich, the policy regarding pregnancy termination was relatively liberal until the introduction of a specific article in the criminal code in 1942. As part of outpatient assessments, Zurich psychiatrists generally authorized abortion for socio-psychiatric reasons in married women, provided they also consented to sterilization. Basel and Bern, where abortions were less frequently authorized, also applied this measure, although it was not systematic. Geneva probably followed the same practice but there are few or no studies on the subject for French-speaking Switzerland and Italian-speaking Switzerland.

=== Pre-2005 legal framework ===
Before the enactment of federal legislation, the legal situation regarding sterilization varied significantly across Switzerland. A 2003 analysis of Swiss law noted that no federal rule specifically addressed sterilization, though the Federal Constitution and several federal laws contained provisions forming the general normative framework for such interventions.

Three cantons had enacted specific legislation: Aargau, Neuchâtel, and Fribourg, while Ticino referred to directives from the Swiss Academy of Medical Sciences (SAMS). The Argovian and Neuchâtel laws largely overlapped, requiring written consent from the person concerned and, in Aargau, also from the spouse if married. For minors or persons under guardianship capable of discernment, consent from the legal representative was also required. For those incapable of discernment, additional approval was needed from experts and cantonal medical authorities.

The Fribourg law was more restrictive, authorizing only sterilization of adults and establishing six material conditions for those incapable of discernment, including that no refusal had been expressed, pregnancy appeared likely, it presented serious health dangers, and no other contraceptive methods were medically feasible.

== Statistical overview ==
=== Documentation by canton ===
Research has been conducted on sterilization practices in various Swiss cantons, though results are only partially comparable due to diversity in periods, regions, institutions, sources, and sampling methods considered. Case studies and systematic surveys have been carried out in multiple cantons including Aargau, Basel-Stadt, Basel-Landschaft, Bern, Fribourg, Geneva, Neuchâtel, St. Gallen, Vaud, Valais, and Zürich.

In Aargau, comprehensive analysis of psychiatric files at the Königsfelden Cantonal Healing and Care Institution revealed 80 female sterilizations between 1892 and 1945, with 58% of affected women being married and most sterilizations performed for social and eugenic reasons. Notably, 70% were performed without informed consent, indicating systematic coercion. From 1925 to 1930, no male sterilizations were found among 600 psychiatric files examined.

In Basel-Landschaft, the Liestal Cantonal Hospital performed 576 female sterilizations between 1930 and 1960, with one-third coupled with abortion until 1939. During 1951–1960, 340 male sterilizations were also performed.

The Waldau Cantonal University Psychiatric Hospital in Bern performed an estimated 516 sterilizations between 1930 and 1953, with more than 90% performed on women and "numerous" cases without informed consent. Eugenic motives were rarely made explicit during this period.

In Zürich, the Psychiatric Polyclinic handled an estimated 1,700-3,600 sterilizations during the 1930s. Until 1942, these were predominantly sterilizations of married women coupled with abortion (about half perceived by those concerned as non-forced), with two-thirds for socio-psychiatric reasons and one-third for eugenic reasons. After 1942, there was a decline in abortion authorizations and the coupled abortion-sterilization practice, with a strong increase in sterilizations alone and, from the 1950s, primarily contraceptive sterilizations.

=== Gender disparities ===
Women were more exposed than men to sterilization due to unwanted or risky pregnancies. Firmly anchored gender roles (notably the faster pathologization of female sexual behavior), the principle of free will (more frequent and stronger resistance from men to pressure attempts), as well as the diversity of motives in the broader context of birth control constituted obvious reasons why, in Switzerland and other non-totalitarian countries like Sweden and Denmark, women were sterilized in vast majority based on psychiatric assessments.

In Zürich, more than 90% of these interventions were performed on women until 1942, then about 80% until 1968. In Nazi Germany, where the practice of forced sterilization was clearly motivated by eugenics and explicitly regulated by law, men and women were sterilized in equal proportions.

== Castration practices ==
=== Shift from eugenic to criminal policy ===
At the beginning of the 20th century, castration moved out of its eugenic context and, from the 1920s, was generally applied only to men. The objective of the intervention was to reduce sexual drive in cases of repeated sexual delinquency, such as child abuse, exhibitionism, and "unnatural fornication," which included male homosexuality.

Like sterilization, this intervention was not regulated by law; the prerequisites for the operation were formal consent and a therapeutic motive, as well as professional care. Interventions were carried out based on psychiatric assessments, in collaboration with the justice system and other involved authorities. The objective was to modify personality to avoid recidivism and thus obtain impunity and social integration.

=== Scale and duration ===
Those affected had the choice between deprivation of liberty (prisons) and castration. Until the early 1970s (when chemical castration became possible), surgical castration served as a prophylactic measure in criminal policy. The extent of this measure has not yet been quantified precisely. According to studies conducted to date and follow-up examinations, at least 500 to 800 men were affected.
