= List of School of Visual Arts people =

This is a list of notable alumni and instructors of the School of Visual Arts.

== Notable alumni ==
=== Animation ===
- Aaron Augenblick (1997) – founder and manager of Augenblick Studios in Brooklyn, New York
- Jerry Beck – animation historian
- Enrico Casarosa – director of the film Luca
- John R. Dilworth (1985) – creator of Courage the Cowardly Dog
- Derek Drymon (1992) – storyboard artist and writer on Rocko's Modern Life and creative director of SpongeBob SquarePants
- Jeremy Goldberg (2016) – creator, animator
- Tom Herpich (2002) – writer, storyboard artist, and character designer on Adventure Time
- Ian Jones-Quartey (2006) – creator of OK K.O.! Let's Be Heroes
- Kyra Kupetsky (2015) - creator of Chikn Nuggit
- Vivienne Medrano (2014) – creator of ZooPhobia, Hazbin Hotel, and Helluva Boss
- Chris Niosi (2011) – animator, voice actor
- Michael Paraskevas (1984) – artist best known for creating Maggie and the Ferocious Beast with his mother Betty Paraskevas
- Bill Plympton (1969) – twice Academy Award-nominated animator
- Chris Prynoski (1994) – animator, founder of Titmouse, Inc.
- Pres Romanillos (1989) – supervising animator at Disney and DreamWorks animation
- Carlos Saldanha (1993) – director of the films Rio and Ferdinand
- Rebecca Sugar (2009) – creator of Steven Universe
- Dana Terrace (2012) – creator of The Owl House
- Daisuke Tsutsumi (1998) – concept artist and art director at Pixar

=== Cartooning (by decade) ===
==== 1940s ====
- Ross Andru (mid-to-late 1940s) – comic book illustrator and editor for DC and Marvel
- Mike Esposito (mid-to-late 1940s) – comic book illustrator (inker) DC, Marvel, Archie Comics
- Ric Estrada (late 1940s) – Cuban-American comics artist who worked for companies including DC Comics
- Bill Gallo (late 1940s) – sports cartoonist and columnist
- Wally Wood (attended 1948) – creator of MAD, Weird Science, Shock SuspenStories, Wally Wood's T.H.U.N.D.E.R. Agents, Witzend, Power Girl

==== 1950s ====
- Gene Bilbrew (early 1950s) – cartoonist and "bizarre art" pioneer
- Steve Ditko (c. 1952) – co-creator of Spider-Man, creator of The Question and others
- Tom Feelings (early to mid-1950s) – pioneering African-American cartoonist and children's book artist
- Stan Goldberg (late 1950s) – longtime artist for Archie Comics
- Archie Goodwin (mid-1950s) – longtime editor and writer for Marvel Comics and DC Comics
- Dick Hodgins Jr. (early 1950s) – cartoonist whose work included illustration, comic strips, and political cartoons
- Larry Ivie (1950s) – comics artist, writer, and collector active in comics fandom in the middle part of the 20th century, described by comics historian Bill Schelly as "the closest thing to an authority on comics that was available in the 1950s"
- Nick Meglin (mid-1950s) – writer, humorist, and artist known for his contributions to Mad
- Tom Moore (c. 1950) – Archie cartoonist, writer, letterer
- Joe Sinnott (c. 1950) – longtime Marvel Comics inker
- Eric Stanton (early 1950s) – underground cartoonist and fetish art pioneer
- Tony Tallarico (early 1950s) – comic book artist, children's book illustrator, and author

==== 1960s ====
- Sal Amendola (1969) – DC Comics, Archie Comics; penciler, inker, writer, production, editor, talent coordinator; primarily known for writing and drawing Batman
- Liz Berube (1961) – romance comic artist for DC in the 1970s
- Herb Trimpe (c. 1960) – comics artist best known as the seminal 1970s artist on The Incredible Hulk and as the first artist to draw for publication the character Wolverine
- John Verpoorten (early 1960s) – comic book artist and editorial worker best known as Marvel Comics' production manager

==== 1970s ====
- Peter Bagge (1977) – alternative cartoonist
- Ray Billingsley (1979) – cartoonist, creator of the syndicated comic strip Curtis
- Joey Cavalieri (1979) – comics writer and editor
- Bo Hampton (mid-1970s) – comic book and cartoon artist
- Keith Haring (late 1970s) – artist and social activist
- John Holmstrom (mid-1970s) – founder of PUNK magazine; co-founder of Comical Funnies with Peter Bagge; creator of Bosko, "America's Least Favorite Cartoon Character"
- Kaz (late 1970s) – underground cartoonist known for his strip Underworld
- Ken Landgraf (1970s) – comic book artist, inker, and self-publisher
- Patrick McDonnell (1978) – cartoonist, author, and playwright, known as the creator of the daily comic strip Mutts
- Tim Sale (attended late 1970s) – Eisner Award-winning comics artist primarily known for his collaborations with writer Jeph Loeb
- Alex Saviuk (1974) – comics artist primarily known for his work on Spider-Man
- Mark Texeira (late 1970s) – comic book artist and painter
- Bob Wiacek (1974) – comic book inker

==== 1980s ====
- Kyle Baker (c. 1985) – graphic novelist and animator
- Tom Baril (1980) – photographer
- Mark Bodé (attended 1982) – cartoonist, son of underground comix creator Vaughn Bodē
- Jon Bogdanove (mid-1980s) – comic book writer/artist known for his work on Power Pack and Superman: The Man of Steel
- Jerry Craft (1984) – cartoonist and children's book illustrator best known for his syndicated newspaper comic strip Mama's Boyz and his graphic novel New Kid
- Matt Davies (late 1980s) – Pulitzer Prize-winning political cartoonist
- Bob Fingerman (c. 1986) – alternative/underground cartoonist and creator of Minimum Wage and White Like She
- Drew Friedman (1981) – alternative cartoonist/illustrator known for his celebrity caricatures
- Rob Gilbert (late 1980s) – children's illustrator, animator, cartoonist, known for The Adventures of Ranger Rick
- Mike Harris (c. 1983) – comic book artist active in the 1980s and 1990s
- Glenn Head (1985) – comic book artist and editor
- Jamal Igle (late 1980s) – DC Comics artist, known for his work on Firestorm, Nightwing, Supergirl and Zatanna
- Katharine Kuharic (c. 1985) – figurative painter and educator
- Marisa Acocella Marchetto (c. 1983) – graphic memoirist known for Cancer Vixen
- Mark Newgarden (1982) – underground cartoonist and creator of the Garbage Pail Kids
- Joe Quesada (1984) – comic book illustrator, editor-in-chief and later chief creative officer of Marvel Comics; majored in illustration
- Dwayne Turner (c. 1989) – comic book and storyboard artist, video game concept illustrator

==== 1990s ====
- Chris Batista (early 1990s) – comic book artist on Legion of Super-Heroes and 52
- Tony Consiglio (c. 1993) – alternative cartoonist
- Farel Dalrymple (late 1990s) – alternative cartoonist
- Nelson DeCastro (early 1990s) – comic book artist and illustrator
- Dennis Detwiller (early 1990s) – comic book artist, collectible card game illustrator (Magic: The Gathering) and video game designer (Scarface: The World is Yours)
- Jordan B. Gorfinkel (early 1990s) – DC Comics editor, Batman
- Sam Henderson (1991) – alternative cartoonist known for his humorous work
- Phil Jimenez (1991) – DC Comics writer/artist for Wonder Woman; artist for Infinite Crisis
- John Paul Leon (early 1990s) – comic book illustrator known for work on Earth X, Static
- Shawn Martinbrough (early 1990s) – comic book illustrator known for his work on Robert Kirkman's Thief of Thieves
- Alitha Martinez (mid-1990s) – comic book artist on Iron Man, Black Panther: World of Wakanda
- Alex Robinson (1993) – cartoonist best known for his graphic novel Box Office Poison
- James Sturm (MFA, 1991) – alternative cartoonist and co-founder of the Center for Cartoon Studies
- Gerard Way (1999) – lead singer of My Chemical Romance (2001–2013; 2019–present); artist of The Breakfast Monkey; author of The Umbrella Academy

==== 2000s ====
- Josh Adams (2009) – comic book and commercial artist, son of comics artist Neal Adams
- Ulises Fariñas (c. 2005) – comic book artist who has worked on Godzilla, Judge Dredd, and Transformers (dropped out)
- Jess Fink (2003) – alternative cartoonist known for her erotic comics
- Tomer Hanuka (2000) – Israel-American cartoonist and illustrator
- Christopher Hastings (2005) – comics writer and artist
- James Jean (2001) – cover artist for the comic book series Fables and The Umbrella Academy, for which he has won six Eisner Awards for "Best Cover Artist"
- Sabrina Jones (MFA, 2003) – activist comics artist, painter, and editor
- Nate Powell (2000) – award-winning cartoonist; illustrator of the March trilogy of non-fiction graphic novels
- Khary Randolph (2000) – comic book artist for Marvel Comics, Epic Comics, DC Comics, Aspen Comics, Image Comics, and Boom! Studios
- Koren Shadmi (mid-2000s) – Israeli-American illustrator and cartoonist
- Dash Shaw (2005) – alternative cartoonist and animator
- Raina Telgemeier (2002) – best-selling author of middle grade and YA graphic novels
- Sara Varon (2002) – cartoonist and illustrator known for her work for children

==== 2010s ====
- Lee Knox Ostertag (2014) – cartoonist and writer known for his webcomic Strong Female Protagonist and his middle grade graphic novel series The Witch Boy, The Hidden Witch, and The Midwinter Witch

=== Computer art ===
- Louisa Bertman – animated shorts
- Laurence Gartel – digital art pioneer

=== Film and video ===
- Martin Ahlgren – cinematographer
- Fred Armisen – actor, comedian, writer and Saturday Night Live cast member; did not graduate
- Jarin Blaschke – cinematographer
- Andrew Bowser – co-director and star of The Mother of Invention
- Sam Brown – comedian and founding member of the sketch comedy troupe The Whitest Kids U' Know
- Steve Carr – film director, Paul Blart: Mall Cop, Daddy Day Care, Next Friday, Are We Done Yet?
- David Caspe – creator of the ABC hit show Happy Endings; screenwriter, That's My Boy; graduated from SVA in 2005 with an MFA
- Zach Cregger – comedian, writer, director, and member of the sketch comedy troupe The Whitest Kids U' Know
- Michael Cuesta – director of L.I.E.
- Randall Emmett – film producer, Rambo, Iron Man; former personal assistant to Mark Wahlberg; graduated SVA in 1995 with a BFA in Film and Video
- Michael Giacchino – film composer
- Craig Gillespie – film and commercial director; Lars and the Real Girl, Mr. Woodcock, and Fright Night; has been directing commercials for over a decade
- Ranbir Kapoor – actor, assistant director, producer; attended workshop; did not graduate
- Rahul Khanna – Indian actor
- Robert Kolodny – director of The Featherweight and cinematographer of Procession, All the Beauty and the Bloodshed
- Jared Leto – film actor (Requiem for a Dream, Lord of War, Fight Club, Dallas Buyers Club); attended SVA for a BFA in Film and Video, during which time he directed and starred in short film Crying Joy; director of music videos for his band Thirty Seconds to Mars: "The Kill", "From Yesterday", "Kings and Queens", "Closer to the Edge", "Hurricane" under the alias of Bartholomew Cubbins, and "A Beautiful Lie" under the alias of Angakok Panipaq
- Joe Lipari – comedian, artist, activist; his award-winning short film "Dream Job" led to a series of dream jobs, most notably leading the creative departments for the Brooklyn Nets and New York Islanders
- Trevor Moore – comedian and founding member of the sketch comedy troupe The Whitest Kids U' Know
- Brennan Lee Mulligan – comedian, actor, writer, and gamemaster
- Geoffrey Notkin – science writer, art director, producer, and host of Meteorite Men and STEM Journals
- Mika Orr – documentary filmmaker
- Kal Parekh – actor
- Joseph M. Petrick – writer and co-director of The Mother of Invention
- Jonathan Pontell – Emmy, Golden Globe, and George Foster Peabody Award winning television director, producer and editor
- Jesse Richards – painter, Remodernist filmmaker and founder of U.S. Stuckism center
- Andrew Rona – film producer and studio executive; former co-president of Rogue Pictures; president of Silver Pictures; produced Unknown, Scary Movie 3, Scream 2, Scream 3, Project X
- Tanya Ryno – film unit, commercial parody, "TV Funhouse" producer for Saturday Night Live
- Carlos Saldanha – director and co-director of Ice Age, Robots, Ice Age: The Meltdown, and Rio; his films have grossed over $2.6 billion worldwide; according to Box Office Mojo, he is the 38th most successful director of all time based on box office gross
- Harris Savides – cinematographer of the films Last Days, Elephant, Gerry, Zodiac, and Milk
- Marc Scarpa – pioneering digital media producer/director; Town Hall with President Clinton, The X Factor Digital Experience, VidBlogger Nation
- Robert J. Sexton – producer, director, writer, and former musician
- Bryan Singer – film director, attended SVA for two years before transferring to the USC School of Cinematic Arts in Los Angeles
- Kazuhiro Soda – director of observational documentaries Campaign, Mental, and Peace
- Dante Tomaselli – film director of Anchor Bay Entertainment's Satan's Playground
- Morten Tyldum – Norwegian director of Headhunters and The Imitation Game
- Ti West – director of House of the Devil, The Sacrament, and the "X" horror film series

=== Fine arts ===
- Kesewa Aboah – painter and visual artist
- Esao Andrews – painter and skateboard designer
- Ali Banisadr – painter and drawer
- Samuel Bayer – music video and commercial director, cinematographer, and visual artist; directed 2010 remake of A Nightmare on Elm Street; graduated SVA with a Bachelor of Fine Arts in 1987
- Robert Beauchamp – painter
- Tom Burr – installation artist
- Robin Byrd – adult film actress; took art and sketching classes at SVA; did life form modeling to help pay for classes
- Chen Shu-ming – Taiwanese artist
- Willie Cole (born 1955), contemporary sculptor, printer, and conceptual and visual artist
- Rosson Crow – painter
- Devon Dikeou (MFA 1988) – visual artist; editor, founder, and publisher of Zingmagazine; curator, collector, and co-founder of Dikeou Collection
- Inka Essenhigh – painter
- Neck Face – graffiti artist
- Charles Fazzino – 3D pop artist
- Andrea Fraser – performance artist
- Pamela Fraser – painter
- Barnaby Furnas – painter
- Jedd Garet – sculptor, painter, and printmaker
- Rita Genet – painter
- Kate Gilmore – multimedia artist
- Keith Haring – painter, street artist and actvist
- Jane Hart – curator and gallerist
- Gus Heinze – painter
- Hai-Hsin Huang – painter
- Issa Ibrahim – outsider artist
- Reverend Jen – performance artist
- Vashtie Kola, also known as Vashtie or Va$htie – director, designer, artist, blogger, party promoter
- Joseph Kosuth – conceptual artist
- Tina La Porta – digital artist
- Robert Lazzarini – sculptor and installation artist
- Dinh Q Lê – fine arts photographer
- Sol LeWitt – artist working in multiple media
- Jennifer Macdonald – conceptual artist
- Donald Martiny – painter
- Mark McCoy – print artist and photographer, notable for releasing on Heartworm Press
- Aleksandra Mir – artist
- Steve Mumford – painter
- Paul A. Paddock – painter
- Elizabeth Peyton – painter
- Andrew Cornell Robinson – multimedia artist
- Jorge Luis Rodriguez – painter, sculptor, mixed-media artist
- Brian Rutenberg – painter
- Kenny Scharf – painter
- Jeff Sonhouse (BFA 1998) – painter
- Rodger Stevens – artist, jeweller and designer
- Sarah Sze – sculptor and MacArthur Fellows Program ("Genius Grant") recipient
- Bradley Theodore – visual artist
- John von Bergen – sculptor
- Charlie White – artist, working primarily in photography

=== Graphic design ===
- Gail Anderson – partner at Anderson Newton Design; faculty at SVA; former senior art director of Rolling Stone
- Jimmy DiResta – maker, graphic designer
- Todd Radom – designer of logos for professional sports teams and leagues
- Rus Yusupov – graphic and visual designer; Internet entrepreneur; co-founder of Vine and HQ Trivia apps

=== Illustration ===
- Jonathan Bean – author and illustrator of children's books
- Federico Castelluccio – painter; Italian-born actor, known for portraying Furio Giunta on the HBO series The Sopranos
- R. Gregory Christie – author and illustrator of children's books
- Paul Brooks Davis – illustrator
- Rama Duwaji – animator, illustrator and ceramist, First Lady of New York City
- Tomer Hanuka – illustrator
- Yuko Shimizu – illustrator
- Yumi Heo – author and illustrator of children's books

=== Music ===
- Chantal Claret – founding member and lead singer of Morningwood
- Michael Giacchino – Academy Award winning film composer; notable for The Incredibles, Up, and Medal of Honor
- Jared Leto – lead singer and co-founder of alternative rock band Thirty Seconds to Mars; actor; film director
- Mark McCoy – influential hardcore punk frontman, notable for Charles Bronson and Das Oath
- Alan Robert – illustrator and bassist for New York City metal band Life of Agony
- Aurelio Voltaire, also known as Voltaire – animator and comic artist
- Gerard Way – lead singer and co-founder of alternative rock band My Chemical Romance; writer of comic book The Umbrella Academy

=== Photography ===
- David Attie – photographer
- Michael Avedon – photographer
- Alison Brady – photographer
- David Carol – photographer
- Renée Cox – artist, photographer
- Nona Faustine – artist, photographer
- Ina Jang – photographer
- Simen Johan – artist, photographer
- Noah Kalina – art and editorial photographer
- Justine Kurland – fine art photographer
- David LaChapelle – photographer
- Olivia Locher – photographer
- Janelle Lynch – artist, photographer
- Matuschka – artist, photographer
- Yamini Nayar – photographer, sculptor
- Signe Pierce – photographer
- Michele Singer Reiner – photographer, film producer
- Lissa Rivera – photographer, curator
- Lorna Simpson – artist
- Amy Stein – photographer
- Daniel Traub – photographer, filmmaker
- Shen Wei – artist, photographer
- Romulo Yanes – photographer

=== Visual narrative ===
- Louisa Bertman – illustrator, animated shorts, animated gifs, film, computer art, visual narrative
- Shing Yin Khor – artist, cartoonist and game designer

=== Other ===
- Camillo Mac Bica – philosopher, author, activist
- John Bollinger – author, financial analyst, hedge fund manager, inventor of Bollinger Bands
- Manuel DeLanda – philosopher and writer
- Mark Kendall – artist and filmmaker; won a Guggenheim Fellowship in 2014
- Sheila Lukins – cook and food writer who co-authored The Silver Palate series of cookbooks and The New Basics Cookbook
- Jon Lung – product designer, graphic designer and co-host of the TV series MythBusters (MFA Products of Design, 2016)
- Adrian Piper – conceptual artist and philosopher; won a Guggenheim Fellowship in 1989
- Jeff Provenzano – skydiver
- Joey Skaggs – multi-media artist and cultural satirist (BFA Media Arts, 1982)
- Mark Ulano – production sound mixer, Inglorious Basterds, Django Unchained, Titanic
- Spider Webb – tattoo artist

== Notable faculty ==
=== Animation ===
- Aurelio Voltaire – musician, animator, author and artist

=== Art history ===
- Mel Bochner – conceptual artist
- Thyrza Nichols Goodeve
- Leandro Katz – conceptual artist and filmmaker
- Donald Kuspit – author of numerous books, including The Cult of the Avant-Garde Artist; The Dialectic of Decadence
- Robert C. Morgan – art critic
- Jerry Saltz – former head art critic, Village Voice; currently writes for New York
- Amy Taubin – author and film critic, contributing editor for BFI Sight & Sound and Film Comment

=== Cartooning ===
- Jessica Abel – graphic novelist, La Perdida
- Sal Amendola – comic book artist primarily associated with DC Comics
- Nick Bertozzi – cartoonist, author of many graphic novels
- Joey Cavalieri – comic book writer/editor
- Evan Dahm - webcartoonist, author of graphic novels, creator of the fantasy settings of Overside and the world of 3rd Voice
- Nelson DeCastro – comic book writer and illustrator
- Will Eisner – comics creator whose SVA courses inspired his books Comics & Sequential Art and Graphic Storytelling & Visual Narrative
- Jason Freeny – toy artist
- Tom Gill – Dell Western cartoonist, noted for the Lone Ranger
- Bill Griffith – creator of Zippy the Pinhead
- Tom Hart – cartoonist, writer, Hutch Owen
- Jamal Igle – comic book artist and writer, creator of Molly Danger, co-creator of The Wrong Earth, Dudley Datson and The Forever Machine
- Carmine Infantino – writer and editor during the silver age of comic books
- Klaus Janson – veteran of several Batman comics, including The Dark Knight Returns, Batman: Black and White, and Batman: Gothic
- Phil Jimenez – illustrator on Wonder Woman, New Xmen, Countdown to Infinite Crisis, JLA-Titans, Planetary/Authority
- Harvey Kurtzman – cartoonist, editor, and founding editor of Mad magazine
- Jason Little – cartoonist known for Shutterbug Follies and Motel Art Improvement Service
- Matt Madden – cartoonist/writer known for works such as Odds Off and the comics-making textbook Drawing Words and Writing Pictures
- Jack Markow – cartoonist, originator of the course in magazine cartooning
- Rick Marschall – writer-editor, Nemo, the Classic Comics Library
- Alitha Martinez – comic book artist
- David Mazzucchelli – illustrator of Batman: Year One; creator of Asterios Polyp
- Josh Neufeld – nonfiction cartoonist
- Joe Orlando – artist-editor, vice president of DC Comics, associate publisher of Mad
- Gary Panter – cartoonist, writer, Jimbo in Purgatory
- Walter Simonson – worked on Thor and X-Men-related comics
- Art Spiegelman – comics artist, editor and advocate for the medium of comics, best known for his Pulitzer Prize-winning graphic novel memoir, Maus
- J. David Spurlock – award-winning illustration & cartooning author-historian; creator rights advocate; longtime associate of Jim Steranko, Frank Frazetta, Neal Adams, and Carmine Infantino; director of the Wallace Wood estate
- Bhob Stewart – comics for The Realist, Charlton, DC, Marvel and Warren Publishing
- Sara Varon – teaches printmaking
- Sam Viviano – contributor and art director at Mad magazine
- Lauren Weinstein – cartoonist, author of Inside Vineyland, Girl Stories, and The Goddess of War

=== Fine arts ===
- Victor Acevedo – digital artist
- Richard Artschwager – sculptor and designer
- Alice Aycock – creator of large, architectural sculptures; solo exhibitions, including at the Museum of Modern Art
- John Bageris – painter
- Robert Beauchamp – painter
- Lynda Benglis – innovator of materials in the 1970s; feminist icon
- Ronald Bladen – sculptor
- David Budd – painter
- John Button – painter
- Dan Christensen – painter
- Chuck Close – painter
- Michael Goldberg – painter
- Eva Hesse – sculptor
- George Ibanez – graffiti artist
- Chaim Koppelman – printmaker, created the Printmaking Dept. at SVA (1959) where he taught until 2007
- Joseph Kosuth – conceptual artist
- Ronnie Landfield – painter
- Thomas Lanigan-Schmidt – artist
- Sol LeWitt – artist
- Michael Loew – painter
- Robert Mangold – painter
- Brice Marden – painter
- Keith Milow – artist
- Marilyn Minter – exhibitions include Salon 94 (NY), Whitney Biennial 2006
- Elizabeth Murray – painter
- Joseph Nechvatal – digital art and theories of virtual reality
- Steve Poleskie – screen printing
- Joseph Raffael – painter
- Jane Rosen – sculptor and painter
- Carolee Schneemann – artist
- Barbara Schwartz – artist
- Joel Shapiro – sculptor
- James Siena – artist
- Marjorie Strider – sculptor
- Jack Whitten – painter
- Hannah Wilke – artist, sculptor, founder of SVA Ceramics Program
- Neil Williams – painter
- Jackie Winsor – sculptor
- Larry Zox – painter

=== Graphic design ===
- Ed Benguiat – calligrapher and type designer; created over 600 typeface fonts, such as Barcelona and Bookman; designed the logos for The New York Times, Playboy, and Sports Illustrated; teaches typography
- Ivan Chermayeff – graphic designer; co-founder of branding agency Chermayeff & Geismar & Haviv
- Jimmy DiResta – graphic designer; host of Hammered with John and Jimmy DiResta, Against the Grain, Dirty Money, and Trash to Cash
- Bob Gill – designer, founding partner of the design agency that would turn into Pentagram, and co-creator of Beatlemania musical
- Milton Glaser – designer and creator of the "I love NY" logo
- Steven Heller – co-founder of the school's MFA "Designer as Author" program
- KAWS, born Brian Donnelly – graffiti artist, limited-edition clothing and toy designer
- Debbie Millman – partner and president of the design division at Sterling Brands
- Tony Palladino – graphic designer and illustrator
- Stefan Sagmeister – award-winning graphic designer
- Paula Scher – graphic designer and principal at the Pentagram design consultancy; created redesigns of the Citibank and Tiffany brands; her work is featured in the Museum of Modern Art and the Cooper-Hewitt, National Design Museum
- James Victore – independent graphic designer
- Rus Yusupov – designer and co-founder of Vine and HQ Trivia

=== Illustration ===
- Ray DiPalma – poet and visual artist
- James McMullan – illustrator and designer
- Barbara Nessim – artist and illustrator
- John Sheridan – poster artist and magazine cover illustrator
- Robert Weaver – pioneering illustrator of the 50s
- George Woodbridge – illustrator known for his exhaustive research and historical accuracy, with exacting expertise in drawing military uniforms

=== Photography ===
- Guy Aroch – photographer, BFA photography department professor
- Marco Breuer – photographer
- Elinor Carucci – photographer, BFA photography department professor
- Laurel Nakadate – video artist, photographer, BFA photography department professor
- Stan Shaffer – photographer
- Amy Stein – photographer
- Amy Taubin – film critic, former curator of video and film at The Kitchen, MFA Photography Video and Related Media department
- Jerry Yulsman – photographer (Playboy, Collier's, Look) and novelist (Elleander Morning)

=== Filmmaking ===
- Roy Frumkes – screenwriter and independent filmmaker
- Bob Giraldi – director and independent filmmaker
- Manfred Kirchheimer – documentary filmmaker, director of Stations of the Elevated and We Were So Beloved
- Robert Kolodny – director of The Featherweight and cinematographer of Procession, All the Beauty and the Bloodshed
- Chris Newman – sound engineer; three-time Academy Award winner and five-time nominee; sound mixer and director; The Godfather, Amadeus, The Exorcist, The Silence of the Lambs, and The English Patient
- Lew Schwartz, founder of film department; former Batman artist; Emmy Award-winning filmmaker
- Gene Stavis – film archivist, cinephile and gay film pioneer
- Amy Taubin – curator, film critic and filmmaker (Film Comment, Millennium Film Journal, Artforum, Premiere, L.A. Weekly, Sight and Sound, The Village Voice)

=== MFA computer art ===
- Victor Acevedo – adjunct professor
- Lillian Schwartz – visiting scholar
