= Roger Stevens =

Roger Stevens may refer to:

- Roger Stevens (diplomat) (1906–1980), British academic, diplomat and civil servant
- Roger L. Stevens (1910–1998), American theatrical producer, arts administrator and real estate executive
- Roger Stevens, Belgian judge, President of the Council of State

== See also ==
- Rodger Stevens, American artist
- Rogers Stevens, American guitarist
