= John Bergen =

John Bergen may refer to:

- John G. Bergen (1814–1867), American public servant and New York City Police Commissioner
- John J. Bergen (1896–1980), American businessman and chairman of the Madison Square Garden Corporation
- John T. Bergen (1786–1855), U.S. Representative from New York

== See also ==
- John von Bergen, Berlin-based American artist
- John S. Van Bergen (1885–1969), American architect
