= List of The Patrick Star Show episodes =

The Patrick Star Show is an American animated television series that premiered on Nickelodeon on July 9, 2021. It is a spin-off of the series SpongeBob SquarePants, which was created by Stephen Hillenburg. It follows Patrick Star as he hosts a talk show at his family home with the support of his family. The series was developed by Luke Brookshier, Marc Ceccarelli, Andrew Goodman, Kaz, Mr. Lawrence, and Vincent Waller. The series has run for a total of five seasons, and in June 2026, was renewed for two more, with the sixth premiering on October 30, 2026.

== Series overview ==
| Season | Episodes | Segments | Originally released | |
| Season | Episodes | Segments | First released | Last released |
|---|---|---|---|---|
| 1 | 26 | 50 | July 9, 2021 | July 25, 2023 |
| 2 | 13 | 26 | July 26, 2023 | July 25, 2024 |
| 3 | 13 (Note: The season contains the last 13 episodes of the Season 2 production cycle.) | 23 | July 29, 2024 | December 24, 2024 |
| 4 | 13 (Note: The season contains the first 13 episodes of the Season 3 production cycle.) | 25 | March 21, 2025 | July 10, 2026 |
| 5 | 14 (Note: The season contains the last 13 episodes of the Season 3 production cycle, and one episode of the Season 4 production cycle.) | 27 | July 17, 2026 | October 23, 2026 |
| 6 | 12 (Note: The season contains the first 13 episodes of the Season 4 production cycle. Despite this, one of them is listed in the upper season.) | TBA | October 30, 2026 | TBA |

== Episodes ==
=== Season 1 (2021–23) ===
| No. overall | No. in season | Title | Directed by | Written by | Original release date | Prod. code | U.S. viewers (millions) |
|---|---|---|---|---|---|---|---|
| 1 | 1 | "Late for Breakfast" | Michelle Bryan (animation), Dave Cunningham (supervising) | Storyboarded by : Kenny Pittenger; Written by : Kaz | July 9, 2021 | 101 | 0.65 |
| 1 | 1 | "Bummer Jobs" | Andrew Overtoom (animation), Sherm Cohen (supervising) | Storyboarded by : Fred Osmond; Written by : Luke Brookshier | July 9, 2021 | 101 | 0.65 |
"Late for Breakfast": Patrick attempts a cooking segment on his show after a mishap which caused him to miss his breakfast. "Bummer Jobs": Patrick and SpongeBob attempt various different jobs. Meanwhile, Squidward tries to collect Cecil's paper route payment.
| 2 | 2 | "Pat-a-thon" | Michelle Bryan (animation), Jeff DeGrandis (storyboard supervision) (Note: DeGrandis is credited as a "storyboard supervisor" rather than a "supervising director".) | Storyboarded by : Fred Osmond; Written by : Kaz | July 16, 2021 | 103 | 0.44 |
| 2 | 2 | "Lost in Couch" | Andrew Overtoom (animation), Sherm Cohen (supervising) | Storyboarded by : Ryan Kramer; Written by : Andrew Goodman | July 16, 2021 | 103 | 0.44 |
"Pat-a-thon": Patrick and Squidina host a telethon for "Snails Who Can't Dance" due to the fact that SpongeBob can't teach Gary how to dance. As Sandy Cheeks fails at different inventions, Squidward falls victim to different joke names while working on the telethon's phone bank and GrandPat partakes in a daredevil act that is covered by Perch Perkins. "Lost in Couch": Patrick dives deep into the depths of the couch while searching for his television remote that has been classified as the Remoto Dragon. When Patrick goes beyond the couch, Squidina enlists her family and other citizens of Bikini Bottom to help rescue him.
| 3 | 3 | "Stair Wars" | Alan Smart (animation), Jeff DeGrandis (storyboard supervision) | Storyboarded by : Piero Piluso; Written by : Mr. Lawrence (Note: Luke Brookshier is listed as the writer on digital releases, but the episode's writer was Mr. Lawrence, who was credited on the premiere of the episode and the DVD release.) | July 23, 2021 | 102 | 0.47 |
| 3 | 3 | "Enemies à la Mode" | Michelle Bryan (animation), Dave Cunningham (supervising) | Storyboarded by : Brian Morante and Mike Dougherty; Written by : Andrew Goodman | July 23, 2021 | 102 | 0.47 |
"Stair Wars": Patrick goes upstairs to get a golf club for his segment involving miniature golf tips while GrandPat goes downstairs to use the downstairs bathroom as GrandPat hates the upstairs bathroom due to the sentient toilet Tinkle. They try to pass each other which soon leads to a stair-off with Cecil, Squidina, and other civilians having to choose sides. "Enemies á la Mode": After being unable to find a good segment from the Wheel of Segments, Patrick wants ice cream and starts chasing the ice cream man around town which prompts Squidina to host a show about enemies. She asks her family about their rivalries like Bunny dealing with a defective toaster and GrandPat smashing clocks due to time being an enemy. There is also a nature documentary about Ouchie's feud with Pinkeye the Sea Bunny.
| 4 | 4 | "The Haunting of Star House" | Michelle Bryan (animation), Sherm Cohen (supervising) | Storyboarded by : Brian Morante; Written by : Mr. Lawrence | July 30, 2021 | 107A | 0.40 |
Patrick mistakes Cecil for a ghost and uses this material for the segment "Peek-A-Boo" to show people ghosts. After this mistake and the fact that haunted houses are for the rich, Squidina orders ghosts from Get a Ghost Incorporated run by the Flying Dutchman. He gets two ghosts that aren't good at being scary. Meanwhile, Squidward makes his latest attempt to get Cecil to pay him the newspaper fee.
| 5 | 5 | "Squidina's Little Helper" | Andrew Overtoom (animation), Jeff DeGrandis (storyboard supervision) | Storyboarded by : Fred Osmond; Written by : Andrew Goodman | August 6, 2021 | 105A | 0.48 |
Squidina is overwhelmed with working on The Patrick Show herself and hires an intern named Fentin Finkle to help with production. However, Fentin steals all the furniture and equipment to start a show for his sister Crabina. It's up to Squidina, Patrick and the rest of the Star family to get them back.
| 6 | 6 | "I Smell a Pat" | Michelle Bryan (animation), Dave Cunningham (supervising) | Storyboarded by : Zeus Cervas; Written by : Luke Brookshier | August 13, 2021 | 105B | 0.35 |
While hosting the "Pat-sterpiece Theater" segment, Patrick reads the story "Downtown Patty" when a freaky funky smell is detected by Patrick as it affects his show. Patrick and Squidina host "Patrick's Stench Safari" in order to find the source of the smell while using different noses to find it in their house and Grandma Tentacle's house.
| 7 | 7 | "Terror at 20,000 Leagues" | Michelle Bryan and Andrew Overtoom (animation), Jeff DeGrandis and Dave Cunningham (supervising) | Storyboarded by : Brian Morante; Written by : Andrew Goodman | October 22, 2021 | 108 | 0.51 |
It's Halloween and Patrick and Squidina go trick-or-treating in hopes of getting a lot of candy. To do this, they go to some of the spookiest and craziest houses. Dr. Plankenstein teaches Pat-Gor and SpongeMonster the true history of Halloween, and a visit from Patrick and Squidina. There are other things shown involving a witch version of Grandma Tentacles controlling the villagers into cleaning up her house through food-oo magic, a commercial for a zombie restaurant, an episode of "Quasar: Dark Side of the Spoon" where Captain Quasar and Pat-Tron deal with a murder machine that Pat-Tron ate and hatched, and a commercial for "Madame Hagfish's Were-Hair Boutique" that specializes in Seawolf grooming.
| 8 | 8 | "Gas Station Vacation" | Andrew Overtoom (animation), Sherm Cohen (supervising) | Storyboarded by : David Gemmill; Written by : Mr. Lawrence | October 29, 2021 | 106A | 0.45 |
The Star family and Tinkle head to their favorite resort Gasland which is only a gas station/car wash/garage. During this time, they cause a lot of damage as they do things like have a pool party and use an unlimited microwave. The owner of Gasland (Gary Anthony Williams) wants to get rid of the stars for making so much destruction where every attempt goes comically awry.
| 9 | 9 | "Bunny the Barbarian" | Michelle Bryan (animation), Jeff DeGrandis (storyboard supervision) | Storyboarded by : Brian Morante; Written by : Kaz | November 5, 2021 | 106B | 0.49 |
While the Star family is cleaning, Bunny decides to go inside Patrick's time closet and ends up going on a large adventure in a game-like parody. She now must defeat an evil Dust Demon before the family movie night.
| 10 | 10 | "The Yard Sale" | Andrew Overtoom (animation), Dave Cunningham (supervising) | Storyboarded by : Piero Piluso; Written by : Mr. Lawrence | November 19, 2021 | 104 | 0.32 |
GrandPat is awakened from his dream of fishing at Goo Lagoon by the Star family yard sale. He finds that the rest of the family have taken his priceless and are selling them. As his family considers all of GrandPat's stuff to be old junk, GrandPat states that each of the stuff represents a precious memories of his like his novelty thumb from Ancient Rome where he worked as Clamiseum Clown, a pair of pliers from the Middle Ages when he worked as a dentist where he tended to Princess Pearlina's pet sea dragon Mr. Boots, a vacuum cleaner from the Old West where he worked as a vacuum cleaner salesman which he worked to sell to a prospector ancestor of Mr. Krabs, and a loopy-hoop from the future where he bought it at Forever '87 while working as a Clamiseum clown. In the end, there is a commercial for Pappy Farms.
| 11 | 11 | "Just in Time for Christmas" | Michelle Bryan (animation), Dave Cunningham (supervising) | Storyboarded by : Fred Osmond; Written by : Mr. Lawrence | December 3, 2021 | 110A | 0.42 |
On Christmas Eve, Patrick is told by his family that he needs to get them better Christmas presents. So he uses his time closet to get Cecil an electric shaver, GrandPat vintage food, Bunny a tattoo, and Squidina a new pet by stealing people's items. Trouble ensues when those people want them back.
| 12 | 12 | "Who's a Big Boy?" | Michelle Bryan (animation), Sherm Cohen (supervising) | Storyboarded by : Fred Osmond; Written by : Mr. Lawrence | March 4, 2022 | 107B | 0.40 |
While doing a fruit smash segment on the show, Patrick travels back to the 1940s to get more fruit. However, he gets exposed to knuclear radiation. The next day, he starts growing bigger and bigger which Squidina thinks that the bigger Patrick is, the better the show will be. However, she is proven wrong when Patrick starts to cause too much trouble at a parade and the military is called in.
| 13 | 13 | "Klopnodian Heritage Festival" | Michelle Bryan (animation), Sherm Cohen (supervising) | Storyboarded by : Kenny Pittenger; Written by : Kaz | March 11, 2022 | 110B | 0.43 |
Patrick and Squidina are called upon to perform rituals honoring their Klopnodian roots. Meanwhile, GrandPat seeks revenge for losing a battle to the Klopnodians several centuries ago.
| 14 | 14 | "To Dad and Back" | Andrew Overtoom (animation), Sherm Cohen (supervising) | Storyboarded by : Piero Piluso; Written by : Kaz | March 18, 2022 | 109A | 0.51 |
Patrick is prompted by an international viewer inquiry to tour the inside of his father's body, but Cecil ends up on a mission of his own to outer space.
| 15 | 15 | "Survivoring" | Michelle Bryan (animation), Jeff DeGrandis (storyboard supervision) | Storyboarded by : Zeus Cervas; Written by : Andrew Goodman | March 25, 2022 | 109B | 0.43 |
Patrick and Squidina take the show to the great outdoors where they compete with their father on survival skills even after Patrick accidentally threw the RV off the cliff. Though things go comically awry while roughing it.
| 16 | 16 | "X Marks the Pot" | Andrew Overtoom (animation), Dave Cunningham (supervising) | Storyboarded by : Fred Osmond; Written by : Luke Brookshier | April 1, 2022 | 111A | 0.37 |
After his release from prison, Man-Ray goes to retrieve an explosive device from his bunker which is located below the Star family residence.
| 17 | 17 | "Patrick's Alley" | Jeff DeGrandis (storyboard supervisor) | Storyboarded by : Zeus Cervas; Written by : Luke Brookshier | April 8, 2022 | 111B | 0.37 |
To raise money for the show, Patrick and Squidina offer to babysit children and tailor the show to them.
| 18 | 18 | "Pearl Wants to Be a Star" | Michelle Bryan (animation), Sherm Cohen (supervising) | Storyboarded by : Zeus Cervas; Written by : Andrew Goodman | April 15, 2022 | 112A | 0.34 |
Pearl guest performs on The Patrick Show while her father Mr. Krabs and GrandPat challenge each other to a series of games.
| 19 | 19 | "Nitwit Neighborhood News" | Michelle Bryan (animation), Sherm Cohen (supervising) | Storyboarded by : Zeus Cervas; Written by : Luke Brookshier | July 22, 2022 (Note: These episodes were first released on the Season 1 Volume 1 DVD on June 21, 2022.) | 113 | 0.29 |
| 19 | 19 | "Mid-Season Finale" | Andrew Overtoom (animation), Dave Cunningham (supervising) | Storyboarded by : Fred Osmond; Written by : Mr. Lawrence | July 22, 2022 | 113 | 0.29 |
"Nitwit Neighborhood News": Patrick and Squidina try to find interesting news stories to report on in town for The Patrick Show, but they accidentally end up being involved in a crime with a wanted criminal. "Mid-Season Finale": The Patrick Show presents its "mid-season finale" show, with several guests from previous episodes.
| 20 | 20 | "Shrinking Stars" | Ian Vazquez (storyboard supervision) | Storyboarded by : Fred Osmond; Written by : Mr. Lawrence | January 13, 2023 | 114A | 0.31 |
In The Patrick Star Show segment of "SpongeBob SquarePants Presents The Tidal Zone" special, an interview with Captain Quasar and Pat-Tron goes wrong as the Star family is accidentally shrunk by Pat-Tron's shrink ray. GrandPat, thinking they're vermin, tries to catch them, which fails as he ends up in the time closet, starting his own adventure. Note: This episode begins a crossover event that continues on SpongeBob SquarePants season 13 episode 12a, Kamp Koral season 1 episode 21, and SpongeBob SquarePants season 13 episode 12b, and concludes on SpongeBob SquarePants season 13 episode 12c.
| 21 | 21 | "Uncredible Journey" "The Uncredible Journey" | Michelle Bryan (animation), Ian Vazquez (storyboard supervision) | Storyboarded by : Dan Becker; Written by : Mr. Lawrence | February 10, 2023 | 115A | 0.19 |
Rube narrates a story about how Patrick's pets Tinkle, Ouchie, and Pinkeye are sent on a wild ride around town after a plumber confuses the toilet for the toilet that GrandPat accidentally broke upon falling down the stairs. While Tinkle, Ouchie, and Pinkeye work to get home, the Star family assume that Tinkle has died when they find the replacement non-sentient toilet.
| 22 | 22 | "Host-a-Palooza" | Andrew Overtoom (animation), Dave Cunningham (supervising) | Storyboarded by : Zeus Cervas; Written by : Kaz | February 17, 2023 | 115B | 0.25 |
Patrick performs an escape trick involving a tank full of air, a cannon, and falling bricks, and surprisingly doesn't get injured. However, a simple trip from a tire causes his entire room to fall apart. As Patrick is injured, Squidina books various guest hosts to cover for him − though it doesn't satisfy a Patrick-hungry audience.
| 23 | 23 | "Backpay Payback" | Michelle Bryan (animation), Sherm Cohen (supervising) | Storyboarded by : Fred Osmond; Written by : Mr. Lawrence | February 24, 2023 | 116A | 0.27 |
Insanity ensues when Granny Tentacles helps her grandson Squidward collect his unpaid newspaper money from Cecil, whose quick thinking and tricky scheming always put him one step ahead of the cephalopod duo - even when GrandPat comes to Cecil's aid.
| 24 | 24 | "House Hunting" | Michelle Bryan (animation), Ian Vazquez (storyboard supervision) | Storyboarded by : Dan Becker; Written by : Luke Brookshier | March 3, 2023 | 116B | 0.21 |
When their coffee-pot accommodation goes on a chicken-like rampage across Ukulele Bottom, the Star family (excluding GrandPat, who didn't escape the house quickly enough) chase it everywhere around town in Patrick's drivable television room. Once the Stars corner the pot on top of a skyscraper, it's revealed that the house was mating a toaster and preparing to have an egg.
| 25 | 25 | "Super Sitters" | Jeff DeGrandis (storyboard supervision) | Storyboarded by : Kenny Pittenger; Written by : Kaz | April 10, 2023 (Note: This episode was first released on the Season 1 Volume 1 DVD on June 21, 2022.) | 112B | 0.15 |
SpongeBob and Patrick go back in time with the latter's time closet to see Mermaid Man and Barnacle Boy episodes when they were new, but they accidentally travel far enough to see them as babies - along with other superheroes like Rubber Bandy and Go Woman and supervillains like Man Ray, Dirty Bubble, Exo-Woman, and Coral Creep. The two are hired by the super babies' daycare director in order to help run the nursery, but they only make things worse, as they prompt the infants to butt heads like they do in the modern comics.
| 26 | 26 | "FitzPatrick" | Michelle Bryan (animation), Sherm Cohen (supervising) | Storyboarded by : Fred Osmond; Written by : Andrew Goodman | April 11, 2023 | 114B | 0.18 |
Patrick's evil "twin" cousin FitzPatrick (Henry Rollins) comes to town and tries to destroy the former's reputation by committing to dastardly deeds under Patrick's name, but the dimwitted starfish always seems to have a solution for the chaos his relative brings upon Ukelele Bottom.
| 27 | 27 | "The Drooling Fool" | Andrew Overtoom (animation), Dave Cunningham (supervising) | Storyboarded by : Eddie Trigueros; Written by : Danny Giovannini | April 12, 2023 | 117A | 0.14 |
After an "ice cream dream", Patrick's newfound case of nonstop drooling gets out of control to the point of it flooding the town.
| 28 | 28 | "Patrick's Got a Zoo Loose" | Michelle Bryan (animation), Sherm Cohen (supervising) | Storyboarded by : Zeus Cervas; Written by : Kaz | April 13, 2023 | 117B | 0.15 |
Rube brings a shape-shifting alien onto the show and it runs loose in the Star home, so it's up to Patrick and Squidina to stop it.
| 29 | 29 | "The Patterfly Effect" | Sean Dempsey (animation), Brett Varon (supervising) | Storyboarded by : Dylan Bozic; Andy Gonsalves (director); Written by : Dylan Bozic, Jacob Fleisher and Andy Gonsalves | April 17, 2023 | 118A | 0.23 |
Patrick travels back in time with his "time closet" to help Bunny live out her misheard dream of becoming a race-car driver (actually preparing her to become a race-car). When Patrick realizes that the future he set the stones to isn't all that great, he continuously tries to find a way to reset the present back to the way it originally was.
| 30 | 30 | "A Space Affair to Remember" | Sean Dempsey (animation), Maxwell Atoms and Bob Camp (supervising) | Storyboarded by : Mike Pelensky; Gabe Del Valle (director); Written by : Kaz, Gabe Del Valle and Mike Pelensky | April 18, 2023 | 118B | 0.16 |
For their anniversary, Patrick and Squidina plan to ship their parents Bunny and Cecil off to ancient Rome - but the duo are accidentally shipped off to outer space instead. Once they're gone, Patrick and Squidina throw a house party that gets more and more out of control. Bunny and Cecil find themselves contestants in an alien game show where the two struggle to win any games.
| 31 | 31 | "Home ECCH!" "Home Ecch" | Alex Conaway and Andrew Overtoom (animation), Brett Varon (supervising) | Storyboarded by : Nora Meek; Zoë Moss (director); Written by : Jacob Fleisher, Zoë Moss and Nora Meek | April 19, 2023 | 119A | 0.15 |
Squidina's not all too great at home economics, and one more bad grade could send her to summer school. Her last project, the "pickle pie", ends up putting her teacher on the edge of his death bed in the hospital. In order to not fail, the cephalopod hosts a TV show for her teacher to watch attempting to prove her skills at home ec.
| 32 | 32 | "Fun & Done!" "Fun and Done" | Sean Dempsey (animation), Maxwell Atoms and Bob Camp (supervising) | Storyboarded by : Allen Zhang; Charlie Jackson (director); Written by : Kaz, Charlie Jackson and Allen Zhang | April 20, 2023 | 119B | 0.19 |
Andrew Fishman, a dull and lifeless child fish, is mistakenly sent to be tutored at Patrick's house. Patrick resents his boring attitude, so he and SpongeBob unlock his imagination. Andy's imagination ends up bringing birth to utterly nonsensical chaos in Patrick's house, so the Patrick and SpongeBob have to stop it before his mom finds out.
| 33 | 33 | "The Lil' Patscals" | Brett Varon (supervising) | Storyboarded by : Andy Gonsalves (also director); Written by : Jacob Fleisher and Andy Gonsalves | April 24, 2023 | 120A | 0.20 |
After hearing GrandPat talk about how much fun his past was without the TV, Patrick decides to go back in time (with his "time-closet") and experience it in real time. He joins his granddad's old friend group "The Kelp Bed Kids" (consisting of GrandPat, Mr. Krabs, Mrs. Puff, Granny Tentacles, and Old Man Walker) and the six embark on an adventure to retrieve a can that Patrick accidentally kicked into Old Man Jenkins' haunted house.
| 34 | 34 | "The Prehistoric Patrick Star Show" | Sean Dempsey and Andrew Overtoom (animation), Maxwell Atoms, Bob Camp, and Tim Prendergrast (supervising) | Storyboarded by : Mike Pelensky; Gabe Del Valle (director); Written by : Kaz, Gabe Del Valle and Mike Pelensky | April 25, 2023 | 120B | 0.29 |
Typical Star family antics ensue in a prehistoric era.
| 35 | 35 | "The Patrick Show Sells Out" | Michelle Bryan and Sean Dempsey (animation), Brett Varon (supervising) | Storyboarded by : Nora Meek; Zoë Moss (director); Written by : Jacob Fleisher, Zoë Moss and Nora Meek | April 26, 2023 | 121A | 0.11 |
After seeing how the only customer in the Krusty Krab enjoys watching The Patrick Show! there, Mr. Krabs decides to become a sponsor for the series. Upon spying on Mr. Krabs, Plankton becomes a sponsor as well and their typical rivalry dynamic is brought on stage as destruction, slander, and abuse occurs.
| 36 | 36 | "Neptune's Ball" | Bob Camp and Tim Prendergrast (supervising) | Storyboarded by : Allen Zhang; Charlie Jackson (director); Written by : Kaz, Charlie Jackson and Allen Zhang | April 27, 2023 | 121B | 0.16 |
Patrick confuses Lady Upturn's invitation to King Neptune's ball as for him and his family, which prompts them to join the party. Unfortunately, the Stars can't seem to keep themselves behaved and in-check, making an absolute mess of things everywhere they go.
| 37 | 37 | "Dad's Stache Stash" | Alex Conaway (animation), Brett Varon (supervising) | Storyboarded by : Miggs Perez; Andy Gonsalves (director); Written by : Jacob Fleisher, Andy Gonsalves and Miggs Perez | May 1, 2023 | 122A | 0.20 |
Cecil presents his prized mustache collection to Patrick and he shows the pink star all of the mustaches worn by the Star family over time. Cecil also shows Patrick a mustache he isn't supposed to wear under any circumstance, but Patrick's curiosity gets to the best of him and is transformed into an evil, old-timey villain as a result. Cecil's got to stop him before he runs over Squidina, Cecil, GrandPat and various audience members with a train.
| 38 | 38 | "A Root Galoot" | Sean Dempsey (animation), Bob Camp and Tim Prendergrast (supervising) | Storyboarded by : Mike Pelensky; Gabe Del Valle (director); Written by : Kaz, Gabe Del Valle and Mike Pelensky | May 2, 2023 | 122B | 0.21 |
Patrick finds a magical "Shmandarake" root (Bobcat Goldthwait) on his gardening show and shows it to the rest of his family at home. The root declares it'll grant a single wish to one of the Star family members, causing all of them to compete for its affection. Meanwhile, Squidina tries to get rid of Shmandrake, suspicious of its intentions.
| 39 | 39 | "The Starry Awards" | Alex S. Conaway (animation), Brett Varon (supervising) | Storyboarded by : Nora Meek; Zoë Moss (director); Written by : Dave Tennant, Zoë Moss and Nora Meek | May 3, 2023 | 123A | 0.22 |
After seeing GrandPat and Cecil feuding over who gets to keep Patrick's #1 dad mug, Patrick decides to host an award ceremony, finding out who and what's the best in each part of the series. Disturbed by the spotlights being set around her house for the show, Granny Tentacles tries to axe Patrick as a form of retaliation.
| 40 | 40 | "Blorpsgiving" | Alex Conaway (animation), Bob Camp and Tim Prendergrast (supervising) | Storyboarded by : Stephen Herczeg; Charlie Jackson (director); Written by : Jacob Fleisher, Charlie Jackson and Stephen Herczeg | May 4, 2023 | 123B | 0.17 |
In this Thanksgiving special, Captain Doug P. Quasar is forced to travel with his dimwitted sidekick Pat-Tron to his home planet TronTron after a peace treaty negotiation goes wrong. There, they celebrate Blorpsgiving where Quasar falls in love with Pat-Tron's Swedish cousin Inga-Tron, but struggles to adapt to the Trons' way of life.
| 41 | 41 | "Stuntin'" | Sean Dempsey (animation), Brett Varon (supervising) | Storyboarded by : Miggs Perez; Written by : Dave Tennant and Miggs Perez | July 3, 2023 | 124A | 0.20 |
Following a major accident with Patrick on set, Squidina chooses GrandPat as Pat's stunt double. GrandPat slowly begins to take over Patrick's place on the show and eventually his life leaving the pink star frustrated and jealous.
| 42 | 42 | "Olly Olly Organ Free" | Michelle Bryan and Sean Dempsey (animation), Bob Camp and Tim Prendergrast (supervising) | Storyboarded by : Mike Pelensky; Gabe Del Valle (director); Written by : Jacob Fleisher, Gabe Del Valle and Mike Pelensky | July 4, 2023 | 124B | 0.13 |
Patrick eats a sandwich full of expired food, causing his organs to leave his body. To remedy this, he puts various household items inside his body as new "organs," gaining him popularity and respect around Ukulele Bottom. Meanwhile, Patrick's organs party and cause chaos around town, but things take a bad turn when they end up in a butcher's deli shop.
| 43 | 43 | "Which Witch is Which?" | Alex S. Conaway (animation), Brett Varon (supervising) | Storyboarded by : Nora Meek; Zoë Moss (director); Written by : Dave Tennant, Zoë Moss and Nora Meek | July 5, 2023 | 125A | 0.17 |
Bunny's mother and Patrick's grandmother Agnes Steelhead (Andrea Martin) visits Patrick and his family, teaching Squidina different magic spells. However, she proves to be a nuisance to the rest of the Stars, causing GrandPat to start a "witch hunt" and run her out of town.
| 44 | 44 | "Get Off My Lawnie" | Sean Dempsey (animation), Bob Camp and Tim Prendergrast (supervising) | Storyboarded by : Stephen Herczeg; Charlie Jackson (director); Written by : Jacob Fleisher, Charlie Jackson and Stephen Herczeg | July 6, 2023 | 125B | 0.17 |
Granny Tentacles reprimands Patrick during a taping of his show due to how loud his act is, leading to Granny getting fans of her own, much to her chagrin.
| 45 | 45 | "Bubble Bass Reviews" | Alex S. Conaway (animation), Brett Varon (supervising) | Storyboarded by : Miggs Perez; Andy Gonsalves (director); Written by : Dave Tennant, Andy Gonsalves and Miggs Perez | July 24, 2023 | 126A | 0.16 |
In a parody of unprofessional online cartoon and movie critics, Bubble Bass "reviews" Patrick's show on his own review show "Bubble Bass Reviews" where he nitpicks its endless flaws, while being interrupted by his mother Mama Bass several times in the process. Patrick and Squidina watch the video and come over to his house to give their response, which ends up spooking Bubble Bass and sending him into a state of panic when he thinks that they are here for revenge.
| 46 | 46 | "Patrick's Prison Pals" | Alex S. Conaway (animation), Bob Camp and Tim Prendergrast (supervising) | Storyboarded by : Mike Pelensky; Gabe Del Valle (director); Written by : Jacob Fleisher, Gabe Del Valle and Mike Pelensky | July 25, 2023 | 126B | 0.19 |
Bunny takes Patrick to the Bikini Bottom Jail for Take Your Child to Work Day and Patrick enjoys all the people and sights of the prison, while a prisoner (Danny Trejo) switches places with Patrick and takes up Patrick's role in Patrick's show.

=== Season 2 (2023–24) ===
The season was originally announced for 26 episodes but in July 2024, the second half of the season was split into a third season, bringing the number of episodes to 13.

| No. overall | No. in season | Title | Directed by | Written by | Original release date | Prod. code | U.S. viewers (millions) |
|---|---|---|---|---|---|---|---|
| 47 | 1 | "The Patrick Show Cashes In" | Sean Dempsey (animation), Tim Prendergrast (supervising) | Storyboarded by : Nora Meek; Zoë Moss (director); Written by : Dave Tennant, Zoë Moss and Nora Meek | July 26, 2023 | 201A | 0.17 |
Patrick ends up starting season two of his show without any money, so he and his family decide to sell dangerous merchandise to fund the second season's budget in a series of commercials with characters returning from various previous episodes.
| 48 | 2 | "The Star Games" | Sean Dempsey (animation), Brett Varon (supervising) | Storyboarded by : Stephen Herczeg; Charlie Jackson (director); Written by : Jacob Fleisher, Charlie Jackson and Stephen Herczeg | July 27, 2023 | 201B | 0.16 |
Patrick sprays himself with "Game Show Host in a Can" and takes over the previous host's role, and invents a bunch of dangerous, unsafe game shows involving things such as expired food and bombs. Later, Patrick's family gets back at Patrick for the torture he put them through, leading to a battle of the game show hosts.
| 49 | 3 | "Super Stars" | Alex Conaway (animation), Bob Camp (supervising) | Storyboarded by : Miggs Perez; Andy Gonsalves (director); Written by : Jacob Fleisher, Andy Gonsalves and Miggs Perez | November 6, 2023 | 202A | 0.13 |
After toxic waste gets dumped on them, Patrick and his family become superheroes, each having their own powers, and do good deeds while working for President Krabs. Their "good deeds" end up causing more harm than good and damage to Ukulele Bottom. They eventually get taken by a giant doily to a villain's secret lair, and the villain happens to be Granny Tentacles who hates the Super Stars' actions.
| 50 | 4 | "Now Museum, Now You Don't" | Sean Dempsey (animation), Tim Prendergast (supervising) | Storyboarded by : Mike Pelensky; Gabe Del Valle (director); Written by : Dave Tennant, Gabe Del Valle and Mike Pelensky | November 7, 2023 | 202B | 0.16 |
Cecil gets a job as a security guard at the art museum. Patrick finds out Cecil forgot his security underwear so Patrick's mother Bunny dresses Patrick up as a burglar and makes him run off into the museum in the middle of the night to give Cecil the underwear. Cecil gets a bucket of white paint on him, making Patrick think his dad's a ghost, and he chases him around various paintings.
| 51 | 5 | "10 & 1 Toilets" "10 and 1 Toilets" | Sean Dempsey (animation), Brett Varon (supervising) | Storyboarded by : Nora Meek; Zoë Moss (director); Written by : Jacob Fleisher, Zoë Moss and Nora Meek | November 8, 2023 | 203A | 0.08 |
In this parody of One Hundred and One Dalmatians, the Star family's pet toilet Tinkle gets pregnant and brings 11 new toilet puppies to Ukulele Bottom, although they end up being quite the hassle for the Star family. A Cruella De Vil-like GrandPat manipulates the Stars into getting them trained so he can use their parts for his "high latrine fashion" line.
| 52 | 6 | "Family Plotz" | Alex S. Conaway (animation), Bob Camp (supervising) | Storyboarded by : Stephen Herczeg; Charlie Jackson (director); Written by : Dave Tennant, Charlie Jackson and Stephen Herczeg | November 9, 2023 | 203B | 0.08 |
Cecil is making soup, and the Star family wants to pass some time outside while the soup is cooking. A tornado switches the "Park" and "Cemetery" signs outside, causing the Star family to follow the "Park" sign to the cemetery and they play around there thinking it's the park, to the dismay of various funeral attendees and the joy of Slappy as he embalms GrandPat. Their ruckus over there causes the people underground to emerge from the dead and chase them around.
| 53 | 7 | "The Wrath of Shmandor" | Sean Dempsey (animation), Tim Prendergast (supervising) | Storyboarded by : Miggs Perez; Andy Gonsalves (director); Written by : Jacob Fleisher, Andy Gonsalves and Miggs Perez | November 13, 2023 | 204A | 0.12 |
The Shmandorians, a highly-advanced microscopic society parodying The Jetsons, are brought the joys of television by Shmandor's scientist. Patrick's show is the first to be broadcast, but his destructive and idiotic yet imitable antics cause chaos. This causes their leader, Rubedor, to bring in the Shmamandos, who have to navigate through the Stars' home and destroy Patrick.
| 54 | 8 | "There Goes the Neighborhood" | Alex S. Conaway (animation), Brett Varon (supervising) | Storyboarded by : Mike Pelensky; Gabe Del Valle (director); Written by : Dave Tennant, Gabe Del Valle and Mike Pelensky | November 14, 2023 | 204B | 0.14 |
Patrick and Squidina decide to go out and interview their neighbors in a parody of Mr. Rogers' Neighborhood after Pat's ice-cream infested "Wheel of Segments" crashes into the woman who lives next door. This turns into a series of gags featuring odd neighbors who either try to avoid them or act quite bizarre - with it all turning out to be a puppet show rouse from an annoyed space alien who only wanted peace and quiet. Throughout all of this, Cecil gets "jobs" disguising as things like a door, a dog, and even Patrick's ice cream scoop.
| 55 | 9 | "Movie Stars" | Michelle Bryan and Alex Conaway (animation), Bob Camp (supervising) | Storyboarded by : Nora Meek; Zoë Moss (director); Written by : Dave Tennant, Zoë Moss and Nora Meek | November 15, 2023 | 205A | 0.12 |
SpongeBob and Patrick work at a movie theater. They start by checking customers for outside food, and working the concession stand. Later, they're forced by their boss to do dangerous things such as throwing dangerous objects at the movie watchers because he couldn't afford a fancy 3D projector.
| 56 | 10 | "Dr. Smart Science with Prof. Patrick" "Dr. Smart Science" | Alex S. Conaway and Sean Dempsey (animation), Tim Prendergast (supervising) | Storyboarded by : Stephen Herczeg; Charlie Jackson (director); Written by : Jacob Fleisher, Charlie Jackson and Stephen Herczeg | November 16, 2023 | 205B | 0.10 |
When Sandy is alarmed of Patrick's pseudo-science antics on his show, she tries to help learn how true science works, but Patrick continues to mess things up in his own wacky ways.
| 57 | 11 | "The Commode Episode" | Sean Dempsey (animation), Brett Varon (supervising) | Storyboarded by : Miggs Perez; Andy Gonsalves (director); Written by : Kaz, Andy Gonsalves and Miggs Perez | February 13, 2024 | 206A | 0.19 |
Patrick is doing his juggling routine for his show, until he has to use the bathroom. Cecil, who's fixing the doorknob on the bathroom door, forgets to install the other half of the doorknob and it ends up being fed to Tinkle, causing Patrick to be trapped in the bathroom. Eventually, more guests arrive to see Patrick and end up getting trapped in the bathroom as well.
| 58 | 12 | "Tying the Klop-Knot" | Alex Conaway (animation), Bob Camp (supervising) | Storyboarded by : Mike Pelensky; Gabe Del Valle (director); Written by : Ben Kurzrock, Gabe Del Valle and Mike Pelensky | February 15, 2024 | 206B | 0.07 |
Bunny and Cecil have to get remarried Klopnodian style when Patrick goes back in time and eats their wedding cake.
| 59 | 13 | "Chum Bucket List" | Sean Dempsey (animation), Tim Prendergast (supervising) | Storyboarded by : Nora Meek; Zoë Moss (director); Written by : Dave Tennant, Zoë Moss and Nora Meek | February 21, 2024 | 207A | 0.12 |
Patrick needs some food to eat for the day and decides on the Chum Bucket after thinking the Krusty Krab is closed because of a balloon blocking his view of it. After Patrick watches Plankton adding poison to the chum, he believes he's poisoned, so he and SpongeBob try to accomplish a list of things on his bucket list before his possible death from food poisoning later.
| 60 | 14 | "Big Baby Patrick" "Big Baby Pat" | Alex Conaway (animation), Brett Varon (supervising) | Storyboarded by : Stephen Herczeg; Charlie Jackson (director); Written by : Jacob Fleisher, Charlie Jackson and Stephen Herczeg | February 22, 2024 | 207B | 0.12 |
Patrick sees his parents about to throw his baby toys away because they need room for a home theater. Patrick asks if he can keep them if he acts like a baby, to which Bunny reluctantly agrees. Patrick then acts like a baby throughout the episode, with his parents treating him like a baby in ways like making him eat baby food and taking him for a ride to go to sleep after his tantrum.
| 61 | 15 | "Is There a Director in the House?" | Alex S. Conaway (animation), Bob Camp (supervising) | Storyboarded by : Miggs Perez; Andy Gonsalves (director); Written by : Dave Tennant, Andy Gonsalves and Miggs Perez | February 27, 2024 | 208A | 0.10 |
Bunny sends Squidina to Camp Kid for working as a director on The Patrick Show for too long, so Patrick has to find a new director for his show while Squidina is away as he tries attempts with Cecil, Plankton, and Bubble Bass.
| 62 | 16 | "Star Cruise" | Alex S. Conaway and Sean Dempsey (animation), Tim Prendergast (supervising) | Storyboarded by : Mike Pelensky; Gabe Del Valle (director); Written by : Jacob Fleisher, Gabe Del Valle and Mike Pelensky | February 28, 2024 | 208B | 0.12 |
Patrick and his family are on their way to a cruise. Because of the cruise map blocking Cecil's view, he ends up tumbling the car he's driving his family in. When they land, they mistake a UFO beam for the cruise ship entrance and end up playing around there and sabotaging the aliens' chance to take over the Earth.
| 63 | 17 | "Best Served Cold" | Alex S. Conaway (animation), Brett Varon (supervising) | Storyboarded by : Nora Meek, Zoë Moss (director); Written by : Dave Tennant, Zoë Moss and Nora Meek | February 29, 2024 | 209A | 0.10 |
After Patrick destroys another one of his ice cream trucks, the Goofy Goober ice cream man visits the Chum Bucket where he encounters Squidward, Fentin Finkle, Gladys, and the Grim Reaper, who are also enemies of Cecil, Squidina, Bunny, and GrandPat respectively. They then decide to team up to exact revenge on the individual family members one by one. When it turns out that the "bunny" that Gladys doesn't like is actually the Easter Bunny and she leaves while remaining quiet about their group when it comes to the plot against Bunny, the others gain a replacement member in a sea fly whose kind has been menaced by Bunny.
| 64 | 18 | "Tattoo Hullabaloo" | Alex S. Conaway (animation), Bob Camp (supervising) | Storyboarded by : Stephen Herczeg; Charlie Jackson (director); Written by : Jacob Fleisher, Charlie Jackson and Stephen Herczeg | May 20, 2024 | 209B | 0.06 |
When Bunny loses one of her tattoos at the beach, she and a sentient hula-girl tattoo named Leilani go out to find him. All the while Leilani's boyfriend, a sailor tattoo named Skip (Carlos Alazraqui), has his own misadventure.
| 65 | 19 | "Too Many Patricks" | Sean Dempsey (animation), Tim Prendergast (supervising) | Storyboarded by : Aaron Springer; Written by : Dave Tennant and Aaron Springer | May 20, 2024 | 210A | 0.06 |
Squidina gets a bunch of calls requesting that Patrick attend their birthday parties which there are too many for Patrick to attend by himself. So she gets an idea for Patrick to use the time closet to create multiple clones of Patrick to attend these parties.
| 66 | 20 | "Much Tofu About Nothing" | Sean Dempsey (animation), Brett Varon (supervising) | Storyboarded by : Miggs Perez; Andy Gonsalves (director); Written by : Jacob Fleisher, Andy Gonsalves and Miggs Perez | May 21, 2024 | 210B | 0.08 |
Patrick, as Pat-Thos, tells a marriage tale taking place in the fictional food town of Hamdonia.
| 67 | 21 | "Face/Off-Model" | Alex S. Conaway (animation), Bob Camp (supervising) | Storyboarded by : Mike Pelensky; Gabe Del Valle (director); Written by : Dave Tennant, Gabe Del Valle and Mike Pelensky | May 22, 2024 | 211A | 0.07 |
Patrick wakes up with his face off-model and he and Squidina ask for help and travel through different eras of time to try and get Patrick's face back to normal.
| 68 | 22 | "5 Star Restaurant" | Sean Dempsey (animation), Tim Prendergast (supervising) | Storyboarded by : Mike Dougherty, Erik Lechtenberg and Nora Meek; Zoë Moss (director); Written by : Mike Dougherty, Jacob Fleisher, Zoë Moss and Nora Meek | May 23, 2024 | 211B | 0.08 |
Patrick, Squidina, Bunny, Cecil, and GrandPat all become workers at the Krusty Krab.
| 69 | 23 | "At Home, On the Lam" | Sean Dempsey (animation), Brett Varon (supervising) | Storyboarded by : Stephen Herczeg; Charlie Jackson (director); Written by : Dave Tennant, Charlie Jackson and Stephen Herczeg | July 22, 2024 | 212A | N/A |
Bunny's chocolate Klopnodian war diorama gets eaten, which she assumes her son Patrick ate. Patrick runs away from Bunny, who is chasing him around, to avoid his punishments that his mother's about to give him for presumably eating the chocolate model.
| 70 | 24 | "Pick Patrick's Path" | Alex S. Conaway (animation), Bob Camp (supervising) | Storyboarded by : Miggs Perez; Andy Gonsalves (director); Written by : Jacob Fleisher, Andy Gonsalves and Miggs Perez | July 23, 2024 | 212B | N/A |
Patrick does an episode of his show where he lets his audience of Lawnies vote on what happens next.
| 71 | 25 | "Time to Eat" | Sean Dempsey (animation), Tim Prendergast (supervising) | Storyboarded by : Mike Pelensky; Gabe Del Valle (director); Written by : Dave Tennant, Gabe Del Valle and Mike Pelensky | July 24, 2024 | 213A | N/A |
Patrick travels through various time periods to find food to eat for his time traveling food show, "Time to Eat."
| 72 | 26 | "Cleanin' House" | Juli Murphy (animation), Brett Varon (supervising) | Storyboarded by : Nora Meek; Zoë Moss (director); Written by : Dave Tennant, Zoë Moss and Nora Meek | July 25, 2024 | 213B | N/A |
Bunny leaves for Klopnod to collect her inheritance. While she's gone, the Star house becomes a complete mess, meaning Patrick, Squidina, Cecil, and GrandPat must clean it before she gets home.

=== Season 3 (2024) ===
This season contains the second half of season 2 in a separate season. Despite this, the episodes are still produced as Season 2.

| No. overall | No. in season | Title | Directed by | Written by | Original release date | Prod. code | U.S. viewers (millions) |
|---|---|---|---|---|---|---|---|
| 73 | 1 | "The Fun Bucket" | Alex S. Conaway (animation), Bob Camp (supervising) | Storyboarded by : Stephen Herczeg; Charlie Jackson (director); Written by : Kaz, Charlie Jackson and Stephen Herczeg | July 29, 2024 | 301A | N/A |
It is Patrick's birthday, and after seeing a commercial on the TV for The Fun Bucket, Patrick wants to go there for his birthday. Meanwhile, Plankton is working on an evil robot for the Chum Bucket, and the wind blowing causes the "F" paper to fly on the sign and make it read "Fun Bucket" causing the Stars to mistake the place as The Fun Bucket and celebrate Patrick's birthday there.
| 74 | 2 | "The Patrick Show After Dark" | Sean Dempsey (animation), Tim Prendergast (supervising) | Storyboarded by : Miggs Perez; Andy Gonsalves (director); Written by : Jacob Fleisher, Andy Gonsalves and Miggs Perez | July 30, 2024 | 301B | N/A |
Patrick stays up late to show the Lawnies his new glow-in-the-dark yo-yo. Slappy gives Patrick the idea to host "The Patrick Show After Dark" where Patrick and Squidina find Sandy, Cecil, Bunny, GrandPat, and a revolution of pets led by Gary.
| 75 | 3 | "Chopping Spree" | Alex S. Conaway (animation), Brett Varon (supervising) | Storyboarded by : Mike Pelensky; Gabe Del Valle (director); Written by : Dave Tennant, Gabe Del Valle and Mike Pelensky | July 31, 2024 | 302A | N/A |
Patrick's barbaric doppleganger Pat the Hapless embarks on a journey to the Shopping Maul to find a bath bomb.
| 76 | 4 | "Captain Quasar in: All Bot Myself" "All Bot Myself" | Sean Dempsey and Juli Murphy (animation), Bob Camp (supervising) | Storyboarded by : Nora Meek; Zoë Moss (director); Written by : Jacob Fleisher, Zoë Moss and Nora Meek | August 1, 2024 | 302B | N/A |
Captain Quasar fires Pat-Tron and hires a new, efficient robot named Smart-tron (Grey DeLisle). Now with no purpose, Pat-Tron "helps" the Star family.
| 77 | 5 | "Star-Robics" | Alex S. Conaway and Sean Dempsey (animation), Tim Prendergast (supervising) | Storyboarded by : Stephen Herczeg; Charlie Jackson (director); Written by : Ben Kurzrock, Charlie Jackson and Stephen Herczeg | August 5, 2024 | 303A | N/A |
Patrick learns different ways to exercise from his family members.
| 78 | 6 | "Who's the Dummy Now?" | Sean Dempsey (animation), Brett Varon (supervising) | Storyboarded by : Miggs Perez; Andy Gonsalves (director); Written by : Kaz, Andy Gonsalves and Miggs Perez | August 6, 2024 | 303B | N/A |
Cecil brings home a wooden ventriloquist dummy named Bananas Foster. After taking over Cecil's life, Bananas invites the rest of his family to the Star home, where they take over the lives of Patrick, Squidina, Bunny, and GrandPat too.
| 79 | 7 | "Patrick Show Land" | Juli Murphy (animation), Bob Camp (supervising) | Storyboarded by : Mike Pelensky; Gabe Del Valle (director); Written by : Jacob Fleisher, Gabe Del Valle and Mike Pelensky | August 7, 2024 | 304A | N/A |
Patrick and Squidina get the idea to open a The Patrick Show-themed amusement park. Meanwhile, thanks to the popularity of the attraction, Cecil struggles to get back into his own home.
| 80 | 8 | "Legend of the Lost Bathroom" | Alex S. Conaway and Sean Dempsey (animation), Tim Prendergast (supervising) | Storyboarded by : Nora Meek and Michael Moloney; Zoë Moss (director); Written by : Jacob Fleisher, Zoë Moss and Nora Meek | August 8, 2024 | 304B | N/A |
GrandPat tells Patrick and Squidina of a legend that leads to a lost bathroom. When the Dartfish family gives them a map, Patrick and Squidina go searching.
| 81 | 9 | "Driven to Drive" | Sean Dempsey (animation), Brett Varon (supervising) | Storyboarded by : Stephen Herczeg; Charlie Jackson (director); Written by : Dave Tennant, Charlie Jackson and Stephen Herczeg | August 19, 2024 | 305A | N/A |
Patrick is "taught" by Cecil how to drive.
| 82 | 10 | "A Patty in Time" | Sean Dempsey and Juli Murphy (animation), Bob Camp (supervising) | Storyboarded by : Miggs Perez; Andy Gonsalves (director); Written by : Kaz, Andy Gonsalves and Miggs Perez | August 20, 2024 | 305B | N/A |
Patrick learns of a new food item at the Krusty Krab called the "Patty Kake" but when Patrick is too late to get the first one, he uses his time closet to stop people like SpongeBob, Squidina, Bubble Bass, and Mrs. Puff from being the first to try it.
| 83 | 11 | "Pat-per Route" | Alex S. Conaway (animation), Tim Prendergast (supervising) | Storyboarded by : Mike Pelensky; Gabe Del Valle (director); Written by : Jacob Fleisher, Gabe Del Valle and Mike Pelensky | August 21, 2024 | 306A | N/A |
Patrick accidentally injures paperboy Squidward, meaning Patrick must help him deliver the rest of the newspapers in his own way.
| 84 | 12 | "Day of the Dartfish" | Sean Dempsey (animation), Brett Varon (supervising) | Storyboarded by : Myke Chilian; Written by : Dave Tennant and Myke Chilian | August 22, 2024 | 306B | N/A |
While scavenging for food, the Dartfish family discovers Slappy stealing the Star family's items for his collection of Patrick memorabilia.
| 85 | 13 | "Something Stupid This Way Comes" | Alex S. Conaway and Juli Murphy (animation), Bob Camp and Tim Prendergrast (supervising) | Storyboarded by : Miggs Perez; Andy Gonsalves (director); Written by : Jacob Fleisher, Andy Gonsalves and Miggs Perez | October 14, 2024 | 310 | N/A |
Madame Hagfish shares tales of Pat-Tron, Pat the Hapless and Pat-gor.
| 86 | 14 | "Thanks But No Thanksgiving" | Sean Dempsey and Juli Murphy (animation), Brett Varon (supervising) | Storyboarded by : Mike Pelensky; Gabe Del Valle (director); Bob Camp (supervisor); Written by : Dave Tennant, Gabe Del Valle, and Mike Pelensky | November 25, 2024 | 311 | N/A |
The Star family go to Klopnod to stay with Bunny’s family for Thanksgiving.
| 87 | 15 | "Squidina’s Holidaze Special" | Alex S. Conaway and Juli Murphy (animation), Bob Camp and Tim Prendergrast (supervising) | Storyboarded by : Stephen Herczeg; Charlie Jackson (director); Written by : Dave Tennant, Charlie Jackson and Stephen Herczeg | December 2, 2024 | 313 | N/A |
Patrick mangles Squidina's script for her school holiday play that she's directing, and has to find ways to improvise her play.
| 88 | 16 | "Patty Poo" | Juli Murphy (animation), Bob Camp (supervising) | Storyboarded by : Nora Meek; Zoë Moss (director); Written by : Dave Tennant, Zoë Moss, and Nora Meek | December 4, 2024 | 307A | N/A |
When Patrick accidentally cuts his arm in half, his hand turns into a mini Patrick called Patty Poo who the audience adores.
| 89 | 17 | "Swaptoberfest" | Alex S. Conaway (animation), Tim Prendergast (supervising) | Storyboarded by : Stephen Herczeg; Charlie Jackson (director); Written by : Jacob Fleisher, Charlie Jackson, and Stephen Herczeg | December 6, 2024 | 307B | N/A |
In celebration of Swaptoberfest, a Klopnodian holiday, the Star family swap roles for the day.
| 90 | 18 | "Patrickle Jokes" | Sean Dempsey (animation), Brett Varon (supervising) | Storyboarded by : Miggs Perez; Andy Gonsalves (director); Written by : Dave Tennant, Andy Gonsalves, and Miggs Perez | December 10, 2024 | 308A | N/A |
Patrick and Squidina go undercover to investigate the Comedy K Novelty factory after seeing a whoopie cushion from them.
| 91 | 19 | "Pat Roast" | Juli Murphy (animation), Bob Camp (supervising) | Storyboarded by : Mike Pelensky; Gabe Del Valle (director); Written by : Jacob Fleisher, Gabe Del Valle and Mike Pelensky | December 12, 2024 | 308B | N/A |
The Patrick Show presents the "Roast of Patrick Star," a talk show where its guests get to make jokes about Patrick at his expense.
| 92 | 20 | "All Out of Idea Bricks" | Alex S. Conaway (animation), Tim Prendergast (supervising) | Storyboarded by : Nora Meek, Mike Dougherty and Michael Moloney; Zoë Moss (director); Written by : Dave Tennant, Zoë Moss and Nora Meek | December 16, 2024 | 309A | N/A |
Patrick runs out of "idea bricks" for his show, so he and Squidina have to make more. When one of the bricks they made runs away, they follow it to RandomLand.
| 93 | 21 | "A Fool Schooled" | Sean Dempsey (animation), Brett Varon (supervising) | Storyboarded by : Stephen Herczeg; Charlie Jackson (director); Written by : Kaz, Charlie Jackson, and Stephen Herczeg | December 18, 2024 | 309B | N/A |
Patrick gets a letter in the mail that says he hasn't finished behavioral training back in kindergarten, so his family home-schools him on the subject.
| 94 | 22 | "Get Ouch" | Alex S. Conway (animation), Tim Prendergast (supervising) | Storyboarded by : Nora Meek, Michael Moloney and Eddie Trigueros; Zoë Moss (director); Written by : Jacob Fleisher, Zoë Moss and Nora Meek | December 20, 2024 | 312A | N/A |
After seeing that Ouchie destroyed the inside of the Star family home, the family gets rid of him, and Pinkeye takes his place while Ouchie is sent back to the pound.
| 95 | 23 | "Day of the Living Dad Jokes" | Sean Dempsey (animation), Brett Varon (supervising) | Storyboarded by : Miggs Perez; Andy Gonsalves (director); Written by : Kaz, Andy Gonsalves and Miggs Perez | December 24, 2024 | 312B | N/A |
Patrick and Squidina must try and find refuge from hearing dad jokes around them upon learning that laughing at such jokes turns them into "dads."

=== Season 4 (2025–26) ===
This season contains the first half of the third production season in a separate season.

| No. overall | No. in season | Title | Directed by | Written by | Original release date | Prod. code | U.S. viewers (millions) |
|---|---|---|---|---|---|---|---|
| 96 | 1 | "Sitcom Stars" | Sean Dempsey (animation), Brett Varon (supervising) | Storyboarded by : Mike Pelensky; Gabe Del Valle (director); Written by : Jacob Fleisher, Gabe Del Valle, and Mike Pelensky | March 21, 2025 | TBA | N/A |
| 96 | 1 | "The Show Must Go Yawn" | Juli Murphy (animation), Bob Camp (supervising) | Storyboarded by : Casey Alexander; Trey Chavez; Written by : Dave Tennant, Casey Alexander, and Trey Chavez | March 21, 2025 | TBA | N/A |
"Sitcom Stars": The Stars are cast in a sitcom world, where Cecil must assure that his two bosses, a banana (Richard Kind) and a gorilla, never cross paths. "The Show Must Go Yawn": After Squidina falls down the stairs and sustains serious injuries, Patrick must run his show by himself, which proves to be difficult.
| 97 | 2 | "The Dated Game" | Alex S. Conway (animation), Tim Prendergast (supervising) | Storyboarded by : Miggs Perez; Andy Gonsalves (director); Written by : Jacob Fleisher, Andy Gonsalves and Miggs Perez | March 28, 2025 | 401 | N/A |
| 97 | 2 | "Ice Cream Headache" | Sean Dempsey (animation), Brett Varon (supervising) | Storyboarded by : Stephen Herczeg; Charlie Jackson (director); Written by : Dave Tennant, Charlie Jackson and Stephen Herczeg | March 28, 2025 | 401 | N/A |
"The Dated Game": After GrandPat and Grandma Tentacles break up, it's up to Patrick and Squidina to get them back together through a matchmaking game show. "Ice Cream Headache": Patrick goes on an uncontrollable ice cream eating rampage, and it's up to Squidina and the Ice Cream King (Peter Browngardt) to capture him.
| 98 | 3 | "A Tinkle in Time" | Juli Murphy (animation), Bob Camp (supervising) | Storyboarded by : Mike Pelensky; Gabe Del Valle (director); Written by : Jacob Fleisher, Gabe Del Valle and Mike Pelensky | April 11, 2025 | 403 | N/A |
| 98 | 3 | "TV or Not TV" | Alex S. Conway (animation), Tim Prendergast (supervising) | Storyboarded by : Casey Alexander; Trey Chavez; Written by : Dave Tennant, Casey Alexander, and Trey Chavez | April 11, 2025 | 403 | N/A |
"A Tinkle in Time": While the Stars are busy, Tinkle goes into Patrick's time closet and travels through multiple dimensions, culminating with him meeting his future descendent (Kelsey Grammer). "TV or Not TV": Bunny and Cecil celebrate "Spend Time with One of Your Kids Day," but Squidina and Patrick just want to watch television.
| 99 | 4 | "Two Pests in a Teapot" | Sean Dempsey (animation), Brett Varon (supervising) | Storyboarded by : Miggs Perez; Andy Gonsalves (director); Written by : Jacob Fleisher, Andy Gonsalves and Miggs Perez | April 18, 2025 | 404 | N/A |
| 99 | 4 | "Partial Recall" | Juli Murphy (animation), Bob Camp (supervising) | Storyboarded by : Stephen Herczeg; Charlie Jackson (director); Written by : Dave Tennant, Charlie Jackson and Stephen Herczeg | April 18, 2025 | 404 | N/A |
"Two Pests in a Teapot": Patrick is tasked with looking after Grandma Tentacles' house. "Partial Recall": After getting injured during a failed attempt at getting a Krabby Patty, Plankton loses his memory and becomes a member of the Dartfish family.
| 100 | 5 | "The Haunting of Flim-Flam House" | Sean Dempsey (animation), Brett Varon (supervising) | Storyboarded by : Mike Pelensky; Gabe Del Valle (director); Written by : Dave Tennant, Gabe Del Valle and Mike Pelensky | April 25, 2025 | 405 | N/A |
| 100 | 5 | "Rube Tube" | Alex S. Conway (animation), Tim Prendergast (supervising) | Storyboarded by : Casey Alexander; Trey Chavez; Written by : Jacob Fleisher, Casey Alexander, and Trey Chavez | April 25, 2025 | 405 | N/A |
"The Haunting of Flim-Flam House": The Flim-Flam Brothers' house is haunted by a mysterious spirit, so Patrick and Squidina try to help them get rid of it. "Rube Tube": Patrick gets jealous after Squidina starts working for Rube.
| 101 | 6 | "Sea Haw" | Juli Murphy (animation), Bob Camp (supervising) | Storyboarded by : Andy Gonsalves; Miggs Perez (director); Written by : Jacob Fleisher, Andy Gonsalves and Miggs Perez | September 12, 2025 | TBA | N/A |
| 101 | 6 | "Lil' Past-Cals" | Alex S. Conaway (animation), Tim Prendergast (supervising) | Storyboarded by : Stephen Herczeg; Charlie Jackson (director); Written by : Dave Tennant, Stephen Herczeg and Charlie Jackson | September 12, 2025 | TBA | N/A |
"Sea Haw": In a parody of the variety show Hee Haw, The Patrick Show! hosts a country-themed programme with various skits and songs. "Lil' Patscals": In a sequel to season 1's "The Lil' Patscals," the Kelpbed Kids travel to the future to retrieve their kicking can trapped in a time capsule. However, on the day that the time capsule is revealed to be opening on the news, with everything left to be preserved in a museum, the fully grown Kelpbed Kids (GrandPat, Mr. Krabs, Mrs. Puff, Granny Tentacles, and Old Man Walker) plan to heist. They come into contact with their past selves, and it leads the two to spar out for the can.
| 102 | 7 | "Zoo U" | Sean Dempsey (animation), Brett Varon (supervising) | Storyboarded by : Gabe Del Valle; Mike Pelensky (director); Written by : Jacob Fleisher, Gabe Del Valle, and Mike Pelensky | September 19, 2025 | TBA | N/A |
| 102 | 7 | "A Remembrance of Grand-Past" | Juli Murphy (animation), Bob Camp (supervising) | Storyboarded by : Casey Alexander; Trey Chavez (director); Written by : Dave Tennant, Casey Alexander, and Trey Chavez | September 19, 2025 | TBA | N/A |
"Zoo U": Cecil confuses the zoo for his old university on a trip there, and the Stars get into all sorts of antics, frustrating the zookeeper. "A Remembrance of Grand-Past": The Stars are in line to see a movie, and as they pass by three movie posters, GrandPat recalls how each one of them really happened, recalling his times in ancient Egypt, serving as a spy, and getting mauled in a 1930s cartoon.
| 103 | 8 | "Pat-Tathalon" | Alex S. Conaway (animation), Tim Prendergast (supervising) | Storyboarded by : Andy Gonsalves; Miggs Perez (director); Written by : Jacob Fleisher, Andy Gonsalves and Miggs Perez | September 26, 2025 | TBA | N/A |
| 103 | 8 | "Upturn's Downturn" | Sean Dempsey (animation), Brett Varon (supervising) | Storyboarded by : Stephen Herczeg; Charlie Jackson (director); Written by : Dave Tennant, Stephen Herczeg and Charlie Jackson | September 26, 2025 | TBA | N/A |
"Pat-Tathalon": Patrick, Pat-Tron and Pat the Hapless compete in a "Pat-Tathalon" for control of the TV. "Upturn's Downturn": Lady Upturn is forced to stay with the Star family.
| 104 | 9 | "Terror on Tape" | Sean Dempsey and Juli Murphy (animation), Brett Varon (supervising) | Storyboarded by : Casey Alexander; Trey Chavez (director); Written by : Dave Tennant, Casey Alexander, and Trey Chavez | October 3, 2025 | TBA | N/A |
"Terror on Tape": The Star Family rent haunted video tapes from The Flying Dutchman, those being "Slayground," a tale of Patrick and Squidina at a haunted playground, "Dinner for Two," where Bunny and Cecil are on the menu while dining out, and "A Star is Unborn," starring GrandPat having a curse put on him by Madame Hagfish, causing him to grow up in reverse.
| 105 | 10 | "Visiting Vikings" | Juli Murphy (animation), Bob Camp (supervising) | Storyboarded by : Andy Gonsalves; Miggs Perez (director); Written by : Dave Tennant, Andy Gonsalves and Miggs Perez | October 10, 2025 | TBA | N/A |
| 105 | 10 | "It's Too Late... With Plankton" | Alex S. Conaway (animation), Tim Prendergast (supervising) | Storyboarded by : Stephen Herczeg; Charlie Jackson (director); Written by : Jacob Fleisher, Stephen Herczeg and Charlie Jackson | October 10, 2025 | TBA | N/A |
"Visiting Vikings": Patrick and SpongeBob travel back to Viking times. "It's Too Late... With Plankton": While the Star family is out skiing, Plankton takes over as host with his own show.
| 106 | 11 | "In a Space Pickle" | Juli Murphy (animation), Bob Camp (supervising) | Storyboarded by : Gabe Del Valle; Mike Pelensky (director); Written by : Jacob Fleisher, Gabe Del Valle, and Mike Pelensky | October 17, 2025 | TBA | N/A |
| 106 | 11 | "Stare Wars" | Sean Dempsey (animation), Tim Prendergast (supervising) | Storyboarded by : Casey Alexander; Trey Chavez (director); Written by : Dave Tennant, Casey Alexander, and Trey Chavez | October 17, 2025 | TBA | N/A |
"In a Space Pickle": Captain Quasar needs Patrick's help on a mission. "Stare Wars": Patrick and GrandPat have a Staring Contest.
| 107 | 12 | "Safety Worst" | Sean Dempsey (animation), Brett Varon (supervising) | Storyboarded by : Andy Gonsalves; Miggs Perez (director); Written by : Jacob Fleisher, Andy Gonsalves and Miggs Perez | October 24, 2025 | TBA | N/A |
| 107 | 12 | "De-Pat-ment Store" | Juli Murphy (animation), Bob Camp (supervising) | Storyboarded by : Stephen Herczeg; Charlie Jackson (director); Written by : Dave Tennant, Stephen Herczeg and Charlie Jackson | October 24, 2025 | TBA | N/A |
"Safety Worst": In light of the daily fires at the Star home, the family is forced to watch a safety video, which is destroyed, so Squidina and Patrick watch the one they made instead. "De-Pat-ment Store": Patrick fumbles his way around Lady Upturn's mall, getting into havoc.
| 108 | 13 | "Doctor Patrick" | Sean Dempsey (animation), Brett Varon (supervising) | Storyboarded by : Casey Alexander; Trey Chavez (director); Written by : Dave Tennant, Casey Alexander, and Trey Chavez | July 10, 2026 | TBA | N/A |
| 108 | 13 | "Slumber Party Stars" | Alex S. Conaway (animation), Tim Prendergast (supervising) | Storyboarded by : Gabe Del Valle; Mike Pelensky (director); Written by : Kaz, Gabe Del Valle, and Mike Pelensky | July 10, 2026 | TBA | N/A |
"Doctor Patrick": Patrick starts helping people after stealing a Doctor's uniform. "Slumber Party Stars": The Star family helps Squidina throw a Slumber Party.

=== Season 5 (2026) ===
This season contains the second half of the third production season in a separate season.

| No. overall | No. in season | Title | Directed by | Written by | Original release date | Prod. code | U.S. viewers (millions) |
|---|---|---|---|---|---|---|---|
| 109 | 1 | "Retreat!" | Alex S. Conaway (animation), Tim Prendergast (supervising) | Storyboarded by : Gabe Del Valle; Mike Pelensky (director); Written by : Jacob Fleisher, Gabe Del Valle, and Mike Pelensky | July 17, 2026 | TBA | N/A |
| 109 | 1 | "Sidekick Search" | Sean Dempsey (animation), Brett Varon (supervising) | Storyboarded by : Andy Gonsalves; Miggs Perez (director); Written by : Dave Tennant, Andy Gonsalves and Miggs Perez | July 17, 2026 | TBA | N/A |
"Retreat!": Patrick inadvertently takes the place of an instructor during a corporate retreat. "Sidekick Search": Squidina and Patrick hold auditions for a potential new sidekick.
| 110 | 2 | "Mass Gramp-nosis" | Juli Murphy (animation), Bob Camp (supervising) | Storyboarded by : Stephen Herczeg; Charlie Jackson (director); Written by : Kaz, Stephen Herczeg and Charlie Jackson | July 24, 2026 | TBA | N/A |
| 110 | 2 | "Cart of Darkness" | Alex S. Conaway (animation), Tim Prendergast (supervising) | Storyboarded by : Gabe Del Valle; Mike Pelensky (director); Written by : Ben Kurzrock, Gabe Del Valle, and Mike Pelensky | July 24, 2026 | TBA | N/A |
"Mass Gramp-nosis": Patrick turns people into GrandPats after a hypnotism stunt gone wrong. "Cart of Darkness": Patrick and Squidina have to retrieve their groceries from a group of criminals.
| 111 | 3 | "Braggin' Slayer" | Sean Dempsey (animation), Brett Varon (supervising) | Storyboarded by : Andy Gonsalves; Miggs Perez (director); Written by : Dave Tennant, Andy Gonsalves and Miggs Perez | July 31, 2026 | TBA | N/A |
| 111 | 3 | "Scaredy Pat" | Juli Murphy (animation), Bob Camp (supervising) | Storyboarded by : Stephen Herczeg; Charlie Jackson (director); Written by : Jacob Fleisher, Stephen Herczeg and Charlie Jackson | July 31, 2026 | TBA | N/A |
"Braggin' Slayer": Tofu Todd and Prince Shmeat go on a quest to defeat a monster. "Scaredy Pat": Patrick learns about Stage-Fright.
| 112 | 4 | "Make Yourself Pat Home" | Sean Dempsey (animation), Tim Prendergast (supervising) | Storyboarded by : Gabe Del Valle; Mike Pelensky (director); Written by : Jacob Fleisher, Gabe Del Valle, and Mike Pelensky | August 7, 2026 | TBA | N/A |
| 112 | 4 | "Accidentally in Love" | Juli Murphy (animation), Brett Varon (supervising) | Storyboarded by : Casey Alexander; Trey Chavez (director); Written by : Dave Tennant, Casey Alexander, and Trey Chavez | August 7, 2026 | TBA | N/A |
"Make Yourself Pat Home": Patrick moves into the SquarePants household. "Accidentally in Love": GrandPat falls in love with Nurse Helga.
| 113 | 5 | "Neighborhood Wash" | Alex S. Conaway (animation), Bob Camp (supervising) | Storyboarded by : Andy Gonsalves; Miggs Perez (director); Written by : Jacob Fleisher, Andy Gonsalves and Miggs Perez | August 21, 2026 | TBA | N/A |
| 113 | 5 | "A Fridge Too Far" | Sean Dempsey (animation), Tim Prendergast (supervising) | Storyboarded by : Stephen Herczeg; Charlie Jackson (director); Written by : Kaz, Stephen Herczeg and Charlie Jackson | August 21, 2026 | TBA | N/A |
"Neighborhood Wash": The Stars' neighbor Gladys becomes a cleanliness obsessed vigilante. "A Fridge Too Far": The Stars start putting their achievements on the fridge.
| 114 | 6 | "The Barbarian Next Door" | Sean Dempsey and Juli Murphy (animation), Brett Varon (supervising) | Storyboarded by : Mike Pelensky; Gabe Del Valle (director); Written by : Dave Tennant, Gabe Del Valle and Mike Pelensky | August 28, 2026 | TBA | N/A |
| 114 | 6 | "Runaway Patrick" | Alex S. Conaway (animation), Bob Camp (supervising) | Storyboarded by : Casey Alexander; Trey Chavez (director); Written by : Casey Alexander, Trey Chavez, and Jacob Fleisher | August 28, 2026 | TBA | N/A |
"The Barbarian Next Door": Patrick and SpongeBob help Pat the Hapless find a job. "Runaway Patrick": Patrick runs away to find another family.
| 115 | 7 | "Dad Election" | Sean Dempsey (animation), Tim Prendergast (supervising) | Storyboarded by : Miggs Perez (director); Written by : Miggs Perez and Dave Tennant | September 11, 2026 | TBA | N/A |
| 115 | 7 | "Supermarket Stars" | Alex S. Conaway (animation), Brett Varon (supervising) | Storyboarded by : Stephen Herczeg; Charlie Jackson (director); Written by : Jacob Fleisher, Stephen Herczeg and Charlie Jackson | September 11, 2026 | TBA | N/A |
"Dad Election": Patrick and Cecil compete in a Dad Election. "Supermarket Stars": The Star family take over a grocery store.
| 116 | 8 | "Witless for the Prosecution" | Juli Murphy (animation), Tim Prendergast (supervising) | Storyboarded by : Casey Alexander; Trey Chavez (director); Written by : Kaz, Casey Alexander, and Trey Chavez | September 18, 2026 | TBA | N/A |
| 116 | 8 | "Time for the News" | Sean Dempsey (animation), Bob Camp (supervising) | Storyboarded by : Mike Pelensky; Gabe Del Valle (director); Written by : Dave Tennant, Gabe Del Valle and Mike Pelensky | September 18, 2026 | TBA | N/A |
"Witless for the Prosecution": Patrick is taken to the Kid Court. "Time for the News": Perch Perkins travels through time to report on various historical events.
| 117 | 9 | "Gone Bootin'" | Juli Murphy (animation), Tim Prendergast (supervising) | Storyboarded by : Gabe Del Valle; Eddie Trigueros (director); Written by : Kaz, Gabe Del Valle, and Eddie Trigueros | September 25, 2026 | TBA | N/A |
| 117 | 9 | "Roller Bunny" | Alex S. Conaway and Sean Dempsey (animation), Brett Varon (supervising) | Storyboarded by : Casey Alexander; Trey Chavez (director); Written by : Casey Alexander, Trey Chavez, and Jacob Fleisher | September 25, 2026 | TBA | N/A |
"Gone Bootin'": Cecil, Harold SquarePants and Jeffrey Tentacles (Henry Winkler), go on a fishing trip together. "Roller Bunny": Bunny competes in a Roller Derby.
| 118 | 10 | "Squ-AD-ina" | Alex S. Conaway (animation), Bob Camp (supervising) | Storyboarded by : Andy Gonsalves; Miggs Perez (director); Written by : Dave Tennant, Andy Gonsalves and Miggs Perez | October 2, 2026 | TBA | N/A |
| 118 | 10 | "Don't Friend the Reaper" | Sean Dempsey (animation), Tim Prendergast (supervising) | Storyboarded by : Stephen Herczeg; Charlie Jackson (director); Written by : Kaz, Stephen Herczeg and Charlie Jackson | October 2, 2026 | TBA | N/A |
"Squ-AD-ina": Squidina and SpongeBob try to film commercials to help fund the show. "Don't Friend the Reaper": GrandPat takes over the Grim Reaper's job.
| 119 | 11 | "Patrick Alone...At Home" | Sean Dempsey (animation), Brett Varon (supervising) | Storyboarded by : Gabe Del Valle; Eddie Trigueros (director); Written by : Jacob Fleisher, Gabe Del Valle, and Eddie Trigueros | October 9, 2026 | TBA | N/A |
| 119 | 11 | "Seagull Scout Adventures" | Alex S. Conaway (animation), Bob Camp (supervising) | Storyboarded by : Casey Alexander; Trey Chavez (director); Written by : Dave Tennant, Casey Alexander, and Trey Chavez | October 9, 2026 | TBA | N/A |
"Patrick Alone...At Home": Patrick is left home alone. "Seagull Scout Adventures": Patrick, SpongeBob and Squidward go camping in order to earn a Seagull Scout badge.
| 120 | 12 | "Scary Tales" | Alex S. Conaway and Juli Murphy (animation), Brett Varon and Tim Prendergast (supervising) | Storyboarded by : Casey Alexander; Charlie Jackson; Miggs Perez (director); Written by : Casey Alexander, Charlie Jackson, Miggs Perez, and Dave Tennant | October 12, 2026 | TBA | N/A |
"Scary Tales": Hans visits the Star home during Halloween and tells spooky stories.
| 121 | 13 | "The Squid and the Square" | Alex S. Conaway (animation), Brett Varon (supervising) | Storyboarded by : Andy Gonsalves; Brian Morante (director); Written by : Andy Gonsalves, Brian Morante, and Jacob Fleisher | October 16, 2026 | TBA | N/A |
| 121 | 13 | "The Over-Under" | Sean Dempsey (animation), Bob Camp (supervising) | Storyboarded by : Stephen Herczeg; Charlie Jackson (director); Written by : Dave Tennant, Stephen Herczeg and Charlie Jackson | October 16, 2026 | TBA | N/A |
"The Squid and the Square": SpongeBob and Squidward start performing on The Patrick Star Show. "The Over-Under": After acquiring an endless amount of Underwear, Cecil tries to sell them as "Overwear".
| 122 | 14 | "Toilet Training" | Juli Murphy (animation), Brett Varon (supervising) | Storyboarded by : Stephen Herczeg; Charlie Jackson (director); Written by : Dave Tennant, Stephen Herczeg and Charlie Jackson | October 23, 2026 | TBA | N/A |
| 122 | 14 | "The Patrick Show Reunion" | Sean Dempsey (animation), Tim Prendergast (supervising) | Storyboarded by : Andy Gonsalves; Miggs Perez (director); Written by : Kaz, Andy Gonsalves and Miggs Perez | October 23, 2026 | TBA | N/A |
"Toilet Training": After attacking Squidward, Tinkle is sent to obedience class. "The Patrick Show Reunion": 30 years in the future, the Patrick Star Show has a reunion special.

=== Season 6 (2026) ===
This season contains the first half of the fourth production season in a separate season. "Scary Tales" was packaged as part of season six, but is listed under season five in accordance with its airdate.

| No. overall | No. in season | Title | Directed by | Written by | Original release date | Prod. code | U.S. viewers (millions) |
|---|---|---|---|---|---|---|---|
| 123 | 1 | "Squidina and the Brain" | Alex S. Conaway (animation), Bob Camp (supervising) | Storyboarded by : Eddie Trigueros; Gabe Del Valle (director); Written by : Dave Tennant, Gabe Del Valle and Eddie Trigueros | October 30, 2026 | TBA | TBD |
| 123 | 1 | "Day of the Snail" | Juli Murphy (animation), Tim Prendergast (supervising) | Storyboarded by : Stephen Herczeg; Trey Chavez (director); Written by : Kaz, Stephen Herczeg and Trey Chavez | October 30, 2026 | TBA | TBD |
"Squidina and the Brain": Patrick loses his brain right before the season premiere, so Squidina has to find Patrick's body. "Day of the Snail": SpongeBob asks Squidina to pet sit Gary.
| 124 | 2 | "Vide OH-NO!" "Family Vide-Oh No!" | Brett Varon (supervising) | Storyboarded by : Charlie Jackson; Miggs Perez (director); Written by : Dave Tennant, Charlie Jackson and Miggs Perez | November 6, 2026 | TBA | TBD |
| 124 | 2 | "The Cool Uncle" | Alex S. Conaway (animation), Bob Camp (supervising) | Storyboarded by : Casey Alexander (director); Written by : Casey Alexander and Dave Tennant | November 6, 2026 | TBA | TBD |
"Vide OH-NO!": After learning their home videos were taped over, Patrick and Squidina go back in time to re-film them. "The Cool Uncle": Cecil's brother Ricky (Jon Heder) comes to visit.
| 125 | 3 | "Drive-In Me Crazy" | Juli Murphy (animation), Tim Prendergast (supervising) | Storyboarded by : Eddie Trigueros; Gabe Del Valle (director); Written by : Dave Tennant, Gabe Del Valle and Eddie Trigueros | November 13, 2026 | TBA | TBD |
| 125 | 3 | "A Stone Age Star is Born" | Alex S. Conaway (animation), Brett Varon (supervising) | Storyboarded by : Stephen Herczeg; Trey Chavez (director); Written by : Kaz, Stephen Herczeg and Trey Chavez | November 13, 2026 | TBA | TBD |
"Drive-In Me Crazy": The Star family visit a Drive-In theater. "A Stone Age Star is Born": Patrick and Cave Patrick accidentally switch places.
| 126 | 4 | "Game Over, Patrick" | Bob Camp (supervising) | Storyboarded by : Andy Gonsalves (director); Written by : Dave Tennant and Andy Gonsalves | November 20, 2026 | TBA | TBD |
| 126 | 4 | "This Old Coffee Pot" | Juli Murphy (animation), Tim Prendergast (supervising) | Storyboarded by : Charlie Jackson; Miggs Perez (director); Written by : Dave Tennant, Charlie Jackson and Miggs Perez | November 20, 2026 | TBA | TBD |
"Game Over, Patrick": Patrick is trapped inside a video game. "This Old Coffee Pot": Patrick hosts a home renovation show.
| 127 | 5 | "Snowbound! A Star Family Christmas" | TBA | TBA | November 27, 2026 | TBA | TBD |
| TBA | TBA | "Litter Jitters" | N/A | N/A | TBA | TBA | TBD |
| TBA | TBA | "GrandPat: The Documentary" | N/A | N/A | TBA | TBA | TBD |

=== Shorts ===
These shorts premiered as a part of Nickelodeon Shorts Showcase, a series of shorts released to either help promote upcoming series or release content from ongoing ones.

| No. | Title | Original release date | Prod. code | U.S. viewers (millions) |
|---|---|---|---|---|
| 1 | "Ghost" | October 15, 2021 | 110A | 0.20 |
| 1 | "Pumpkin Carving" | October 15, 2021 | 110B | 0.20 |
