= Rita Genet =

American-born artist

- Born: Rhode Island, United States
- Education: University of Connecticut; School of Visual Arts
- Known for: Painting

Rita Genet is an American-born artist who has lived and worked in Jamaica for 20 years.

== Early life ==
Born in Rhode Island and raised in Milford, Connecticut, Genet studied art at the University of Connecticut in Storrs, and the School of Visual Arts in New York City, where she earned a Bachelor of Fine Arts degree in painting, and was a member of the Board of Directors of the Alumni Society. In 1972, as a young textile designer in New York City, Genet traveled to Jamaica on holiday. It was there that she became inspired by what she saw, and began painting her decidedly Caribbean style. Eventually, she quit her job in New York City, and moved to Ocho Rios, Jamaica, where she could focus on her painting.

== Painting career ==
Genet's portrayals of tropical colours, angels, trees, and Caribbean style has increased the popularity of her work in international galleries and with private collectors. Her style has been called "sophisticated-naivety", for her use of colour.

During her 20 years of painting in Jamaica, Genet's listings in group exhibitions included Harmony Hall, Round Hill Charity Shows, Tryall, The National Gallery, and The Bay Gallery, Montego Bay. Her work has been included in a showing of Jamaican artists in Berlin and in the Galerie Pro Arte Kasper, Lausanne, Switzerland in the International Competition for 25 countries. She has shown in New York, New Jersey, U.S. Virgin Islands and has paintings in many corporate collections in both the United States and abroad. Ms. Genet's work was featured on the cover of the Nov/Dec 1995 issue of SkyWritings (Air Jamaica's In-Flight Magazine).

While in Jamaica, Genet was invited to do Christmas cards for United Nations Children's Fund (UNICEF), The Jamaica Association for the Deaf., hotels, corporations and various other charities. Her work has also been reproduced as note cards and prints.

== Personal ==
Genet currently resides in Asheville, North Carolina. While she continues to hold "Jamaica as her muse", in recent years, she has been inspired by the architecture in and around the city of Asheville and has been painting some of Asheville's favorite scenes.
