= Jane Rosen =

American sculptor (born 1950)

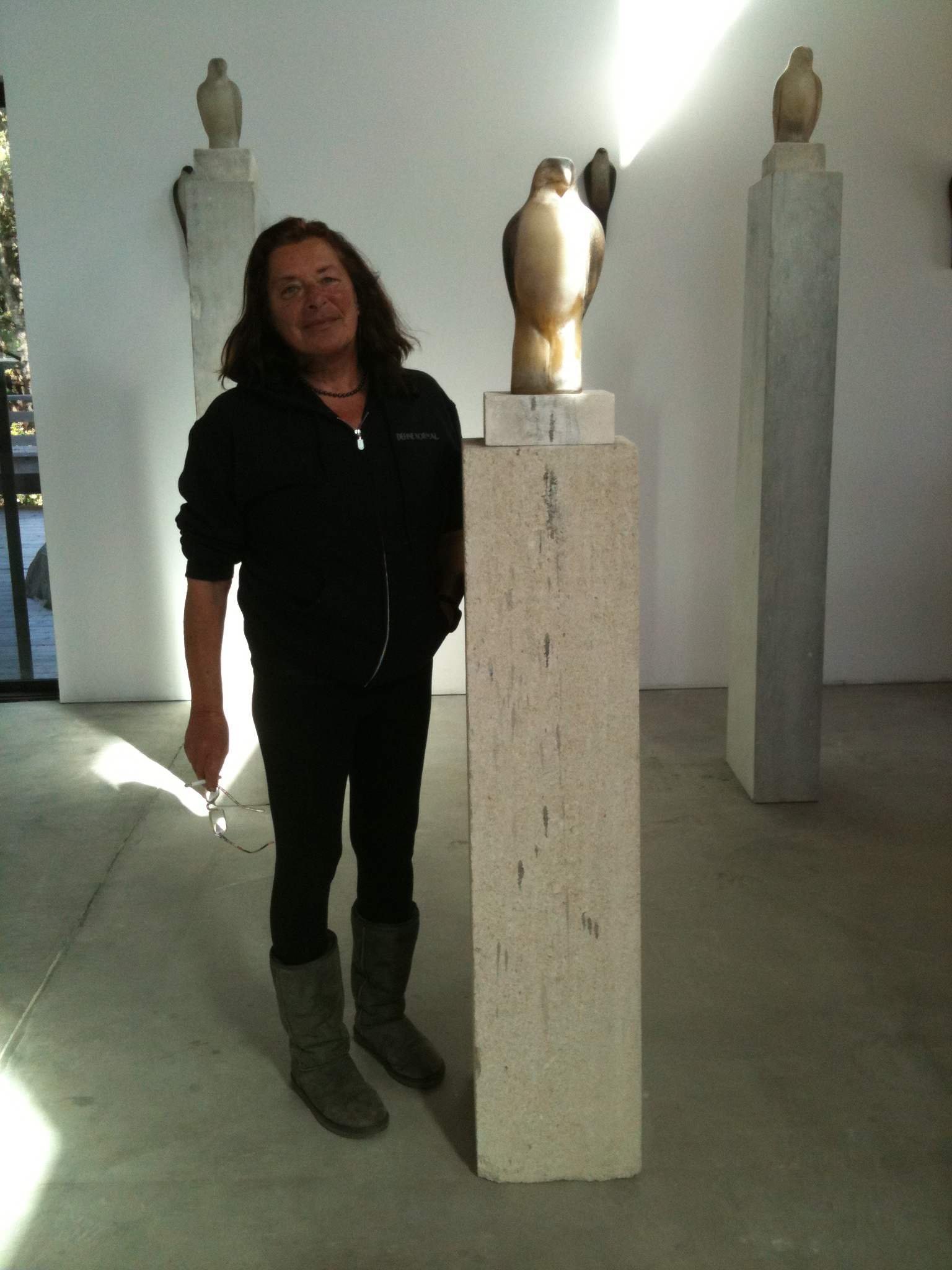
- Jane Rosen in San Gregorio by Celia Gerard
- Born: Jane Rosen; April 6, 1950; New York, NY
- Died: April 18, 2025 (aged 75)

Jane Rosen (1950-2025) was an American artist, working in sculpture, drawing and printmaking. While Rosen's career was established in her native New York in the 1970s and 80s, with well received exhibitions and a teaching position at the School of Visual Arts, "a trip to Northern California provided an unexpected pivot for her aesthetic vision and her life." She lived on both coasts and subsequently began a teaching position at the University of California, Berkeley. Rosen "made the break from her urban existence as an artist in New York to a life as an artist on her ranch in California."

Rosen exhibits in New York, California and across the country. Rosen's work has been reviewed in the New York Times, Artforum, Art in America, and Art News.

== Exhibitions ==
Since the mid-1970s, Rosen's work has been shown in numerous group and solo exhibitions across the country at venues such as the National Museum of Wildlife Art, Maier Museum of Art at Randolph College, Edward Thorp Gallery, Grace Borgenicht Gallery, Mincher-Wilcox Gallery, Tayloe Piggott Gallery, Sears-Peyton Gallery, Traver Gallery, Gail Severn Gallery, and P.S.1. Her work was also selected by the American Academy of Arts and Letters for inclusion in their 2010 and 2015 Annual Invitational exhibits in New York. Notable exhibitions include "Judy Pfaff and Jane Rosen," Braunstein/Quay Gallery (2005); "James Castle and Jane Rosen," Tayloe Piggott Gallery (2010); and "A Gathering" with Dozier Bell, Catherine Hamilton, Jane Rosen, and Kiki Smith, Georgia State University's Welch School Gallery (2014).

== Collections ==
Rosen's work has been acquired by a variety of public and private collections, including the Albright-Knox Art Gallery, Aspen Art Museum, Brooklyn Museum, Chevron Corporation, Grace Borgenicht, JP Morgan Chase Bank, Luso American Foundation, Mallin Collection, Mitsubishi Corporation, and the Museum of Contemporary Art San Diego. Through the Art in Embassies Program, her work can also be found in the U.S. Consulate in Guangzhou, China, and the U.S. Embassies in Baghdad and Tunis.

== Awards ==
Between 1980 and 1983, Rosen received grants in sculpture from the National Endowment for the Arts and the Creative Artists Public Service Program (CAPS). Then, in 1988 she traveled to Portugal through a Luso-American Foundation grant, where she began carving stone. Her art making and materials further expanded to include glass after being awarded artist residencies in 1999 and 2008 at the Pilchuck Glass School in Washington. Rosen is also the recipient of the 2015 Arts and Letters Award in Art from the American Academy of Arts and Letters.

== Teaching ==
Rosen has taught art at a number of institutions, including the School of Visual Arts in New York (1978–1989); Maryland Institute College of Art (1985); University of California, Davis (1990–1992); Stanford University (1993); Bard College (1995–1996); LaCoste School of the Arts (1998); and the University of California, Berkeley (1994–1995, 1996–2005). She takes her role as an instructor and mentor very seriously. Many of her students have gone on to become successful artists in their own regard. At the heart of Rosen's teaching is the idea of connecting the tactile with the visual. She calls her method "Seeing through Touch." It stems in part from the work of her drawing teacher, Robert Beverly Hale, who wrote "Drawing Lessons from the Great Masters." Rosen's technique incorporates elements of Renaissance drawing and Asian calligraphy and engages what is sensed by the body with what is seen by the eye. Rosen believes that when you connect the sensation of touch to your line of sight, it activates a feeling of wonder and discovery as you draw. Her drawing method encourages direct observation of nature and the translation of sensory responses into lines.

== In popular culture ==
Rosen's print "Pescadero Lamb" appears in Renesmee's bedroom in the movie The Twilight Saga: Breaking Dawn – Part 2.
