= Underworld (comic strip) =

American comic strip by Kaz

Q: "Billy, what life form does God take the most delight in?"

Underworld is an adult-themed comic strip written and drawn by the artist Kaz since 1992. It runs in many American alternative weeklies such as the New York Press and the SF Bay Guardian. It features regular characters such as Smoking Cat, Sam Snuff, Creep Rat, Nuzzle, Petit Mort, and others, interacting within an archetypal inner-city environment. The strip's humor is often abstract, with observations such as that God's favorite form of life is the doofus.

Six book collections of Underworld strips have been published by Fantagraphics Books:

- Underworld: Cruel and Unusual Comics
- Bare Bulbs: Underworld Two
- Ink Punk: Underworld Three
- Duh: Underworld 4
- Underworld 5: My Little Funny
- Underworld 6: We Are Not Saints
- Underworld: From Hoboken to Hollywood - omnibus collection.

== See also ==
- Official site
