= Amy Stein =

American photographer (born 1970)

Amy Stein (born 1970) is an American photographer. Some of her photo series include Stranded and Domesticated. Her work has been shown at the National Academy of Sciences in Washington, D.C.. In 2007 she was one of fifteen "emerging artists" selected by American Photo magazine.

== Life and work ==
Stein studied at the International Centre of Photography and the School of Visual Arts in New York City.

== Publications ==
=== Publication by Stein ===
- Domesticated. Photolucida, 2008. ISBN 978-1934334041.

=== Publication paired with others ===
- Tall Poppy Syndrome. Decode, 2012. With Stacy Arezou Mehrfar. ISBN 978-0983394228.

=== Publication with contribution by Stein ===
- Hijacked Vol. 1: Australia and America. San Francisco: Last Gasp, 2008.

== Solo exhibitions ==
- Domesticated: Photographs by Amy Stein, National Academy of Sciences, Washington, D.C., May–October 2014.
- Domesticated, Zillman Art Museum, Bangor, ME, January 21 – at least August 7, 2021.
- Tall Poppy Syndrome, Edmund Pearce Gallery, Melbourne, Australia (2013).
- Tall Poppy Syndrome, ClampArt, New York, New York (2013).

== Awards ==
- 2007: One of fifteen "emerging artists" selected by American Photo magazine.

== Collections ==
Stein's work is held in the following permanent collection:

- Museum of Contemporary Photography, Chicago, IL: 6 items
