= Pamela Fraser =

American artist and writer

Pamela Fraser (born 1965) is an American artist and writer.

Fraser received her BFA in painting (1988) from the School of Visual Arts in New York and her MFA in New Genres (1992) from UCLA. She has exhibited nationally and internationally. Ms. Fraser's solo exhibitions include Galerie Schmidt Maczollek in Cologne, Galleria Il Capricorno in Venice, Asprey Jacques in London, Vedanta Gallery in Chicago, and Casey Kaplan in New York. Select two-person and group exhibitions include galleries and institutions such as GAD Gallery in Oslo, The Albright-Knox Art Gallery in Buffalo, Shipper and Krome and Podewil Centre in Berlin, Württembergischer Kunstverein Stuttgart, Stadtische Ausstellungshalle am Hawerkamp in Munster, and Dundee Center of Contemporary Art in Scotland. She is the author of How Color Works: Color Theory in the 21st Century and co-editor of Beyond Critique: Contemporary Art in Theory, Practice, and Instruction.

== Books ==
- How Color Works: Color Theory in the 21st Century
- Beyond Critique: Contemporary Art in Theory, Practice, and Instruction
