= Louisa Bertman =

American artist

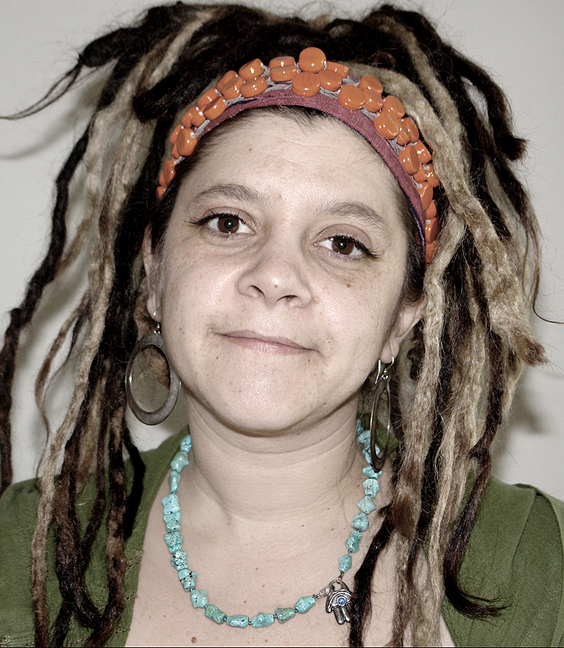
- Born: Newton, Massachusetts
- Education: School of Visual Arts, Parsons School of Design, New York University
- Known for: Illustration, gifs, animated shorts, film, visual narrative, digital activism
- Style: Digital

Louisa Bertman is an activist, illustrator, GIF artist and filmmaker living in Cambridge, Massachusetts. She primarily creates digital art focused on sex, race, age, and cultural identity. Bertman utilizes the power of visual narratives to enable activism and change. Her art often includes graphic imagery.

== Personal life ==
Louisa Bertman is from Newton, Massachusetts. Her parents are Richard Bertman, a sculptor, and architect, and Sandra Bertman, a thanatologist and founding director of University of Massachusetts Medical School's Medical Humanities program. Her brothers are David Bertman, a television director and editor, and Jonathan Bertman.

== Professional career ==
Bertman is currently Assistant Professor of Illustration and Visual Narrative at the Lesley University College of Art and Design. She is an active illustrator, GIF artist, animator, filmmaker, and NFT artist.

Bertman has created work for The New York Times, The Wall Street Journal, Los Angeles Times, ESPN's The Undefeated, GQ, The Root, and The Nation.
