= George Ibanez =

American graffiti artist (b. 1964)

Crime79 SA
- Born: George Ibañez; December 31, 1964 (age 61); New York City
- Education: Art Students League of New York
- Alma mater: SVA NYC
- Notable work: My Creative Journey
- Movement: Graffiti
- Website: crime79.com

Tag

George Ibañez (born December 31, 1964), known by his pseudonymous tag as Crime79, is a New York City-based graffiti artist. His style is rooted in popular culture, often incorporating political messages.

== Early life ==
Ibañez was born in New York City in 1964. He began painting subways at the age of thirteen in the East New York section of Brooklyn. Ibañez was named Class Artist and received the Art Students League of New York Gold Medal. He then studied at the School of Visual Arts.

== Career ==
As a street artist, Ibañez uses the tag or name Crime79. From 1977 to 1984, he painted numerous subway cars, including painting an entire train with a poem. A photo of the poem appeared on the opening page of Subway Art by Martha Cooper and Henry Chalfant.

Ibañez was a member of a group called the Soul Artists who were among the first to transition graffiti art from subways to legitimate galleries. Crime79’s first show of paintings was at the Rainbow Gallery in New York City’s SoHo District in 1983. His works were regarded as, “simply the best pieces in the show” by ArtSpeak magazine. In 2009, two of his paintings were sold by the Millon & Associés Auction House in Paris, France.

In addition to paintings, Crime79 practices his art in a variety of mediums, including:

- Album cover for Tony Touch (2004)
- Mural backdrop for LL Cool J's “Hush” video (2004)
- Wrapper for his limited edition chocolate bar, Caramel Crime
- Canvas for Diggy Simmons for the MTV reality show, Run’s House

Crime79’s works are featured in documentaries, music videos, video games (The Warriors), and numerous publications, including The Source, ARTnews, Print, Warp, New York Daily News, and The Village Voice.

In December 2022, Ibanez wrote an autobiography titled My Creative Journey, published by Ashford Street Press.
