= Ranger Rick =

American children's nature magazine

- January 1967 front cover
- Editorial Director: Hannah Schardt
- Categories: Nature
- Frequency: 10 per year
- First issue: January 1967
- Company: National Wildlife Federation
- Country: United States
- Based in: Reston, Virginia
- Website: rangerrick.org
- ISSN: 0738-6656

Ranger Rick, originally Ranger Rick's Nature Magazine, is a children's nature magazine that is published by the United States National Wildlife Federation (NWF). The magazine offers feature articles and activities for children ages eight and up to spark their interest in the outdoors and encourage them to become more actively involved in protecting the environment. The magazine's primary intention is to instill a passion for nature and promote activity outdoors. NWF also publishes two companion magazines, Ranger Rick Jr., which is aimed at ages four to eight, and Ranger Rick Cub, which is aimed at kids zero to four years old.

== History ==
In 1959, John Ashley "Ash" Brownridge (1917–2015), under the pseudonym John A. Morris, wrote the book The Adventures of Rick Raccoon, starring an anthropomorphic raccoon named Rick and his friends in the Deep Green Wood. After seeing a book a colleague sent from Japan that featured a tanuki, he was inspired to create a book to teach children the value of conservation. Two years later, in 1960, he wrote another book entitled Ranger Rick and the Great Forest Fire. Then, in January 1967, the first issue of Ranger Rick's Nature Magazine was published. The magazine was so popular that by 1972, NWF's membership had tripled.

The first illustrator of the magazine was painter Lorin Thompson, who drew the characters in a realistic yet expressive manner. In 1982, he was replaced by Alton Langford, who redesigned the existing characters and introduced new characters Scarlett Fox and Boomer Badger. In 1999, Robby Gilbert took over as the new illustrator, coinciding with the magazine's shift from short stories to comic strips. In 2009, British company TheCharacterShop became the new illustrators, rendering the comics as three-dimensional images. In 2016, TheCharacterShop, under the direction of Parker Jacobs, gave the comics a new two-dimensional cartoony style.

== Characters ==
Numerous characters have appeared in the magazine series. The current main three characters from the magazine's monthly comics are as follows:

- Ranger Rick is a raccoon that serves as the park ranger and leader of Deep Green Wood. He was first portrayed extinguishing a forest fire in the first issue. He and his friends have many adventures together (as depicted in the magazine's regularly featured cartoon and fiction stories) and always look for new ways to help preserve the environment.
- Scarlett Fox is an American red fox that wears a red neckerchief (formerly with her initials on it). Coming from the lower Appalachian Mountains in her debut in 1983, she was portrayed with a Southern accent, which was soon dropped. As with many depictions of foxes in popular culture, she is cunning and quick-witted, leading her own advice column called "Ask Scarlett" in the 1990s and from 2018 onward. As Ranger Rick's deputy, she can take command of a situation in an instant.
- Boomer Badger is an arrogant American badger who first appeared in 1984. He prefers to lay around and play games rather than take care of the environment, although he usually learns a lesson by the end of the story. He is shown in modern issues to love electronic devices.

== Publication information ==
Ranger Rick has a circulation of 525,000, and an estimated 200,000 more children are exposed to the magazine via passed along copies. The magazine is published ten times a year by the National Wildlife Federation. The headquarters is in Reston, Virginia.

The magazine uses an environmentally friendly processed paper, which is composed of consumer waste (about 30%) and is absent of chlorine. Vegetable oils largely make up the magazine's actual ink.

== Features ==
Each issue includes nonfiction articles about various environmental and animal topics, fictional story-like articles, and color photography throughout. Also included in the magazine are activities such as nature-themed games, activities that get children to actively learn more about their environment, riddles, and jokes. Most of the pages of the magazine feature multi-page photo stories of animals in their natural habitats. There are also illustrated stories, games, riddles, nature news, poetry, contests, and other features and columns. Ranger Rick, a raccoon park ranger, is the title character in the longstanding magazine feature Ranger Rick Adventures (originally Ranger Rick and his Friends, then Adventures of Ranger Rick): an illustrated short story depicting Ranger Rick and his compatriots from Deep Green Wood exploring the world, often encountering threats to wildlife and environmental problems. Rick or any one of his friends, including Scarlett Fox, his deputy, and Boomer Badger always finds a solution to whatever problem they encounter, thus encouraging children to do their part to protect the natural environment.

December/January 2017 50th anniversary front cover

Ranger Rick magazines have featured a variety of adventure stories tackling various subjects, such as the hazards of fishing lines at sea or invasive species in the Everglades. Ranger Rick is sometimes incorporated in elementary science classrooms to enhance the interest of environmental conservation in young children.

== 21st century modifications ==
Because technology had greatly influenced and impacted the lives of children, Ranger Rick magazine made modifications in order to appeal to those becoming increasingly distant to outdoor exploration. To inspire a new generation of conservationists, attracting young readers seemed essential to a magazine promoting environmental awareness and preservation efforts. Ranger Rick made changes within its content to appeal to a changed generation of children, for profit and the future of conservation efforts. It reduced the amount of narrative, replacing most with more visually engaging elements. Ranger Rick himself transformed from a somewhat realistic representation to a stylized cartoon figure. Layout changes included placing the text and titles in locations more likely to attract readers.

== Ranger Rick Jr. ==
Ranger Rick Jr. was a magazine for children ages four to seven. It had its origins in Your Big Backyard, a magazine aimed at preschoolers and kids ages three to seven. It was established in 1979 as a sister publication to Ranger Rick and Wild Animal Baby, both published by the National Wildlife Federation. The bulk of the magazine consisted of children's activities.

The name of the magazine was changed to Big Backyard in September 2011. In December 2012, NWF merged Wild Animal Baby and Big Backyard to create a new magazine for children ages four to seven, called Ranger Rick, Jr..

== Adaptations ==
Ranger Rick's debut on television started with an animated television commercial during the early 1970s. A stop-motion-live-action special was aired during the 1980s on PBS. In 2021, Red Rock Films announced a partnership with the National Wildlife Federation and Bix Pix Entertainment to develop a new streaming series based on Ranger Rick's adventures.
