= Rob Gilbert =

American cartoonist

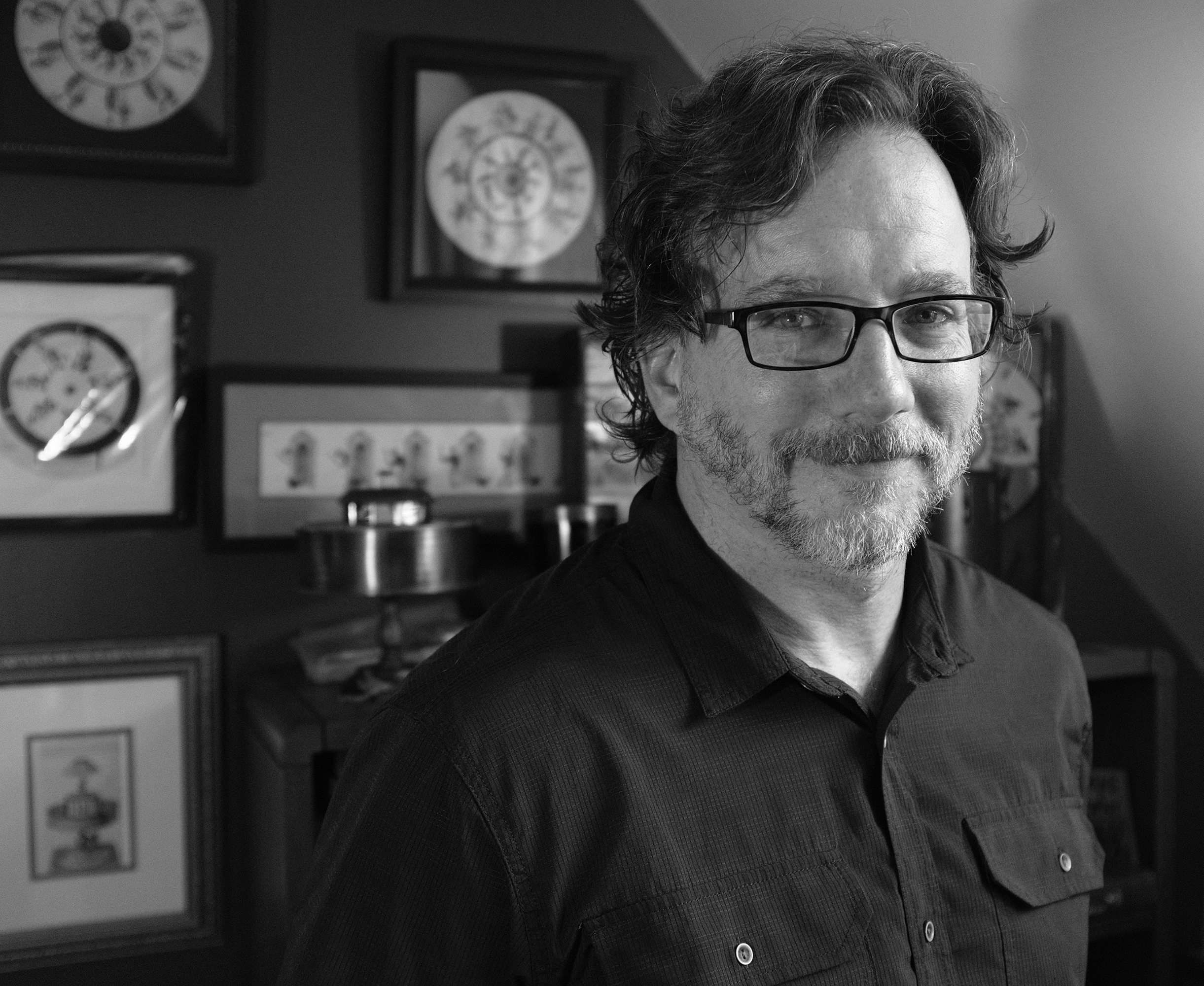
Robby Gilbert 2020

Robby Gilbert (sometimes credited as Rob Gilbert) is an American animator, illustrator, historian, writer, and cartoonist best known for work in educational and interactive media. He illustrated the monthly comic strip, "The Adventures of Ranger Rick," and worked on animation for MTV's "Liquid Television". Additionally, he served as an animation director on early projects for Disney Interactive and as senior animator for Broderbund Software's "Living Books" series. He is the author of New York Animation, 1966-1999: A City in Motion for the Palgrave Animation Series, and has contributed writing to books such as The Invisible Fisherman: The Art of Bill Brand.

His work often explores the relationships and interconnectivity of many artistic disciplines. Gilbert has taught animation, illustration, and game design at several colleges is currently a professor of animation at Rowan University in Glassboro, New Jersey.

Gilbert grew up in New York City where he took an early interest in drawing, acting, music, and film. Animation appealed to him as a discipline that involved a synthesis of creative interests. He has worked extensively as an animator for commercial studios such as Broadcast Arts, and Jumbo Pictures as well as independent television programming and film. In 1993 he began working with pioneering interactive media companies such as Broderbund Software and Paramount Interactive, where he directed projects that earned several awards including a National Parenting Publications award. In addition, he has illustrated several children's books. From 1999 to 2009, he illustrated the monthly comic strip “The Adventures of Ranger Rick” for the National Wildlife Federation's award-winning Ranger Rick Magazine, combining interests in storytelling, drawing, and environmental themes.

Gilbert received a BFA in Media Arts and Animation from the School of Visual Arts in 1989, studying under Howard Beckerman and Harvey Kurtzman. He began teaching animation and game design in Seattle, Washington where he eventually earned a M.Ed. in Education. In 2015 he earned a MFA in Visual Art from the Vermont College of Fine Arts in Montpelier, Vermont., studying under feminist artist Faith Wilding.

Gilbert is the founder of the Vermont Animation Festival, an annual festival that celebrates student animation from around the world.

Children's books he has illustrated include:

- It's Raining, It's Pouring, written by Kin Eagle, 1994. Whispering Coyote Press
- Out of the Night, by Lola Schaefer, 1995. Whispering Coyote Press
- Hey Diddle, Diddle, by Kin Eagle, 1996. Charlesbridge Publishing
- Rub A Dub, Dub, by Kin Eagle, 1997. Charlesbridge Publishing
- Humpty Dumpty, by Kin Eagle, 1999. Charlesbridge Publishing.
