= John Bageris =

American artist (1924–2000)

- Born: May 11, 1924; Fremont, Ohio, U.S.
- Died: May 9, 2000 (aged 75); Concord, Massachusetts, U.S.
- Education: School of the Art Institute of Chicago; University of Chicago; Wayne State University; Academy of Fine Arts, Munich
- Known for: Painting
- Awards: Fulbright Scholarship

John Bageris (1924–2000) was an American artist.

Bageris was born in Fremont, Ohio, on May 11, 1924. He studied at the Art Institute of Chicago with Boris Anisfeld. He earned a BFA and MFA from the University of Chicago and Wayne State University.

Bageris' works have been exhibited at the Art Institute of Chicago, Detroit Institute of Art, Werbe Gallery in Detroit, the Whitney Museum of American Art, Smithsonian Institution, the Institute of Contemporary Art in Peru, Souza Gallery in Mexico City, and the Museum of Modern Art in New York.

In 1953–54 he was awarded a Fulbright Scholarship to study the Academy of Fine Arts in Munich. He has been the recipient of many awards in regional and national shows for his large abstract paintings. In a 1992 Boston Globe review of a retrospective of his work, Nancy Stapen wrote of Bageris as "a gifted figurative artist who shifted to abstraction in the mid 70s." His work contained "a strong flavor of Giacometti" and was "about nature, feeling, energy, and pictoral space."

His works are currently held in the permanent collections of the Museum of Modern Art in New York, and the Whitney Museum of American Art.

Bageris taught at The Art Institute of Boston for nearly 20 years. He also worked an instructor of Painting & Drawing at the School of Visual Arts, the DeCordova Museum, and Brooklyn Museum Art School.

During his years as a teacher, Bageris mentored such artists as Sue Burrus, Debbie Clark, and David Pontbriand

He retired from teaching at The Art Institute of Boston in 1993. Bageris died on May 9, 2000, in Concord, MA.
