= Rodger Stevens =

American sculptor

- Born: Brooklyn, New York, United States
- Education: School of Visual Arts; Parsons The New School for Design
- Known for: Sculpture

Rodger Stevens is a contemporary American artist.

Stevens graduated from the Poly Prep Country Day School in Brooklyn and went on to study economics at Manhattanville College in Purchase, New York, and at Pace University in Manhattan. Stevens then attended Parsons The New School for Design and the School of Visual Arts. From 1994 through 1999, he worked at Sotheby's in New York.

In the early nineties he began exhibiting his drawings and sculptures at small galleries throughout New York and eventually in more renowned venues such as the Tiffany & Co. windows, the MTV headquarters, the Todd Oldham boutique and the Yohji Yamamoto showroom in SoHo. In recent years he has done commissioned work for the Whitney Museum of American Art, the American Folk Art Museum, the Federal Reserve Bank of New York, Barneys, West Elm, The New York Times, Stuart Weitzman, the Rockwell Group, Jonathan Adler, Starbucks, the W Hotel, One Medical, The Advisory Board, and others. In 2011, he was selected by the Persol eyewear company to be a member of their "Work of Persol" artist series. Stevens continues to exhibit internationally, California, and elsewhere. His work has been featured in numerous publications and blogs. He has developed a line of sculptural air-plant holders for West Elm; collaborated with designer Mark McKenna on the illuminated mobile, Orchadia; created several large-scale mobiles for the Starbucks company; and designed a line of carpets for Lindstrom Rugs (Los Angeles). In addition to his art and jewelry practice, he is an active curator, and an adjunct professor at the Parsons School of Design. His work is currently carried by the Whitney Museum and the Brooklyn Museum, and he is represented by BDDW, Kinder Modern, Brad Ford's FAIR, and Timothy Yarger Fine Art in Los Angeles.

== Exhibition history ==
Stevens' work has been exhibited both domestically and internationally. His work has been exhibited at: The Whitney Museum of American Art; the American Folk Art Museum in New York; the Saatchi Gallery in London; the Katonah Museum of Art; Sotheby's; Tiffany & Co.; the Federal Reserve Bank of New York; the Bristol Art Museum in Rhode Island; the Hangaram Design Museum in Seoul, the Patrick Parrish Gallery, the David Weeks Studio and elsewhere.
