= John von Bergen =

American visual artist based in Berlin

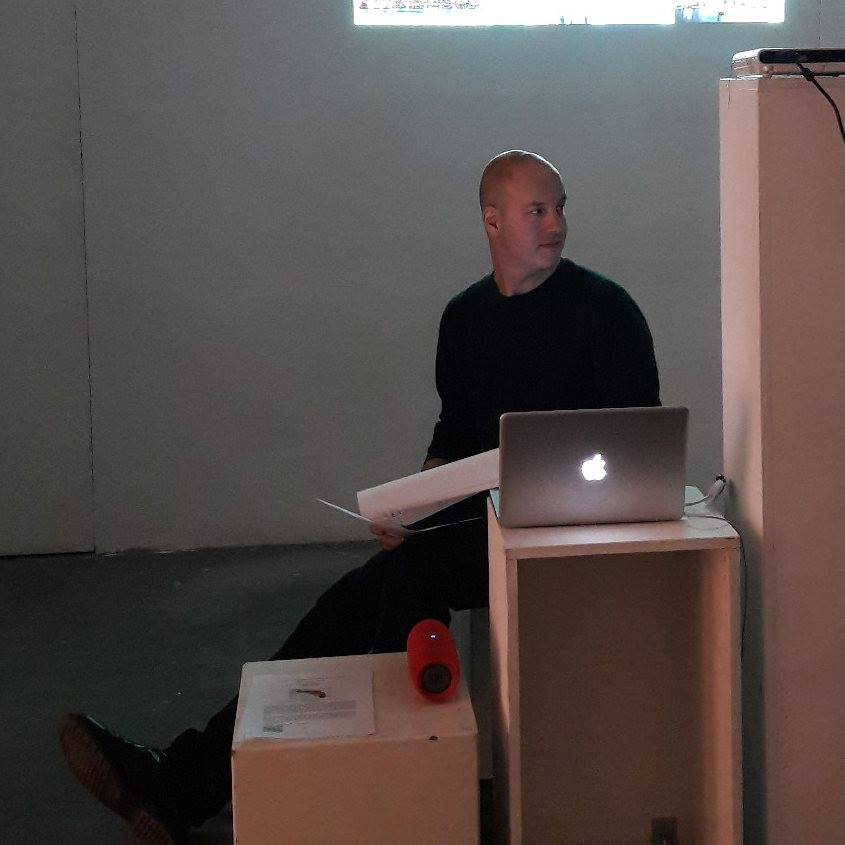

John von Bergen is an American visual artist. His work has been exhibited and collected widely in Europe, South America and in The United States.

== Personal background ==
John von Bergen was raised in Greenwich, Connecticut and moved to New York City at the age of 19. He attended the School of Visual Arts, earning his Bachelor of Fine Arts degree with Honors in 1996.

== Fine art background ==
In both John von Bergen's drawings and sculptural work is a recognizable interest in exploring, where the utilization of unusual materials blend in flowing transition from the apparent towards the invention of idiosyncratic worlds.

As writer Jonathan Lethem has noted about von Bergen's sculptural work: "... they seem to create a problem of interpreting process. At a glance there’s the suggestion of an event or a moment, but whether that would be a destructive, or a creative, or a conflictual moment, is actually a moment… the apprehension of what’s in front of you. You realize that you’re looking at something that appears to have grown, or shifted, or has been delicately restored, and that there is actually no birth moment. There is only a kind of description of struggle between creative, destructive, and reconstructive processes, and that you’re always looking at several of these things at once. You can’t make a back formation out of it, or any narrative out of it. You can’t say: ‘Well, this depicts this interruption or this conflict.’ In fact, it’s always a little stranger than that… or a lot stranger than that.”

== Exhibitions, awards and activities ==
Von Bergen's work has been shown at the Kunstmuseum Stuttgart, the Pera Museum in Istanbul, Smack Mellon in Brooklyn, New York, Kjubh Kunstverein in Cologne, Wilhelm-Hack-Museum in Ludwigshafen, Halle 14 in Leipzig, Autocenter in Berlin, and the former Galerie Schmela in Düsseldorf.

In 2009 he received a Pollock-Krasner Foundation grant.

In January 2014, von Bergen presented the exhibition "Prey Voidant" at the Alexander Levy Gallery in Berlin. The exhibition coincided with the release of his first monograph titled "CORE", published by Kerber Verlag and distributed by d.a.p.

Von Bergen served as Director of Studio Arts for Bard College Berlin from 2017 - 2022. He is currently involved in implementing a permanent installation commissioned by Bundesamt für Bauwesen und Raumordnung for a new extension of The Bundestag in Berlin. He is a 2020 recipient of a Recherchestipendium Bildende Kunst (Senatsverwaltung für Kultur, Berlin), and a 2022 Kunstfonds Grant recipient (Bonn, Germany). In 2024 von Bergen was a guest at the Josef and Anni Albers Foundation Residency in Bethany, CT. As of January 2025, John von Bergen serves as Sculpture Professor at George Mason University in Fairfax, Virginia.
