= Our Lady of the Nativity of Our Blessed Lady's Church (Bronx) =

Church building in New York, United States of America

Coordinates: 40°53′20″N 73°49′57.5″W

Nativity of Our Blessed Lady Church
- Interactive map of the Nativity of Our Blessed Lady Church area

General information
- Location: Eastchester, Bronx, New York City, United States of America
- Client: Roman Catholic Archdiocese of New York

Design and construction
- Architects: Don Shepherd, a designer.

The Nativity of Our Blessed Lady is a Roman Catholic parish church under the authority of the Roman Catholic Archdiocese of New York, located at 1510 East 233rd Street and the corner of Secor Avenue, Bronx, New York in the Eastchester neighborhood of the northern Bronx. The church was designed by Don Shepherd, a designer and not an architect. The AIA Guide to New York City described it as "a minor work but one which calls attention to itself because of its location and the rusted steel crucifix that dominates the corner of the site."

== History ==
The original church of this parish was erected in 1924 (just across the street from its current location) where the playground area of The Nativity of Our Blessed Lady School (3893 Dyre Avenue) is located.

The Nativity of Our Blessed Lady church's cornerstone is dated 1969. The grammar school opened in 1953 and has seen different orders of educators, including the Sisters of Mercy the Sisters of Charity, and Dominicans.

While the original church was being constructed, masses for the community's primarily Italian, German, and Irish parishioners were conducted at Brienlinger's Hall, a popular party and dance hall, at the corner of Boston Post Road (Route 1) and Dyre Avenue. In the summer of 1923, a huge tent was erected on the corner of East 233rd and Secor Avenue, where the present Nativity church now stands, and Masses were held there. When the original church opened in 1924, Marina Cosentino made crocheted-border tablecloths for the altar. There were also movie nights and minstrel shows inside the original church during the 1920s.

The original Nativity church was destroyed by fire in 1958. During the fire, two or three men rushed into the church to climb up into the niche above the altar and rescue the beautiful wood-carved statue of the Blessed Mother and carry it out of the church before it burned. For the next twenty years it remained in a school janitorial closet, before being disposed of.

After the original church burned, Masses and church events were held in the school auditorium for a decade, with a makeshift altar on the auditorium's small stage and rows of folding chairs serving as pews. Large oscillating fans were brought into the auditorium during the summer months.

Masses continued there until the construction and opening of the new and present Nativity church in 1969, the interior of which features textured stucco-type walls and dark wood accents on the altar and confessionals, as well as contrasting red wood pews. A large Crucifix hangs on the back wall at the center of the altar, and a very contemporary, very large, even overpowering wood-sculpted risen Christ with arms extended to Heaven covers the altar's side wall by the organ and added piano. The Stations of the Cross hang as large wood-carved plaques, partially illuminated by ten skylights (in addition to the large skylight positioned directly above the altar's center table structure, divided into four sections by two substantial crossing beams), and more modern additions include carpeting on the altar, electronic candle bays, and a large painting of Our Lady of Guadalupe near the original tabernacle (a much smaller tabernacle now occupies the back of the altar, partially obscuring the large Crucifix there). The acoustics system is exceptional in its clarity and resonance.

The church's congregation now represents many ethnic groups, reflecting the residential population of the Eastchester area. October is observed as "The Month of the Rosary," during which a statue of the Blessed Mother is moved to a new home each Friday and stays one week for a "Rosary Visit."

In 2015, the Parish of the Nativity merged with that of Holy Rosary.
