= Rattlesnake Creek (Bronx) =

River in the Bronx, New York

Coordinates: 40°53′18″N 73°50′25″W

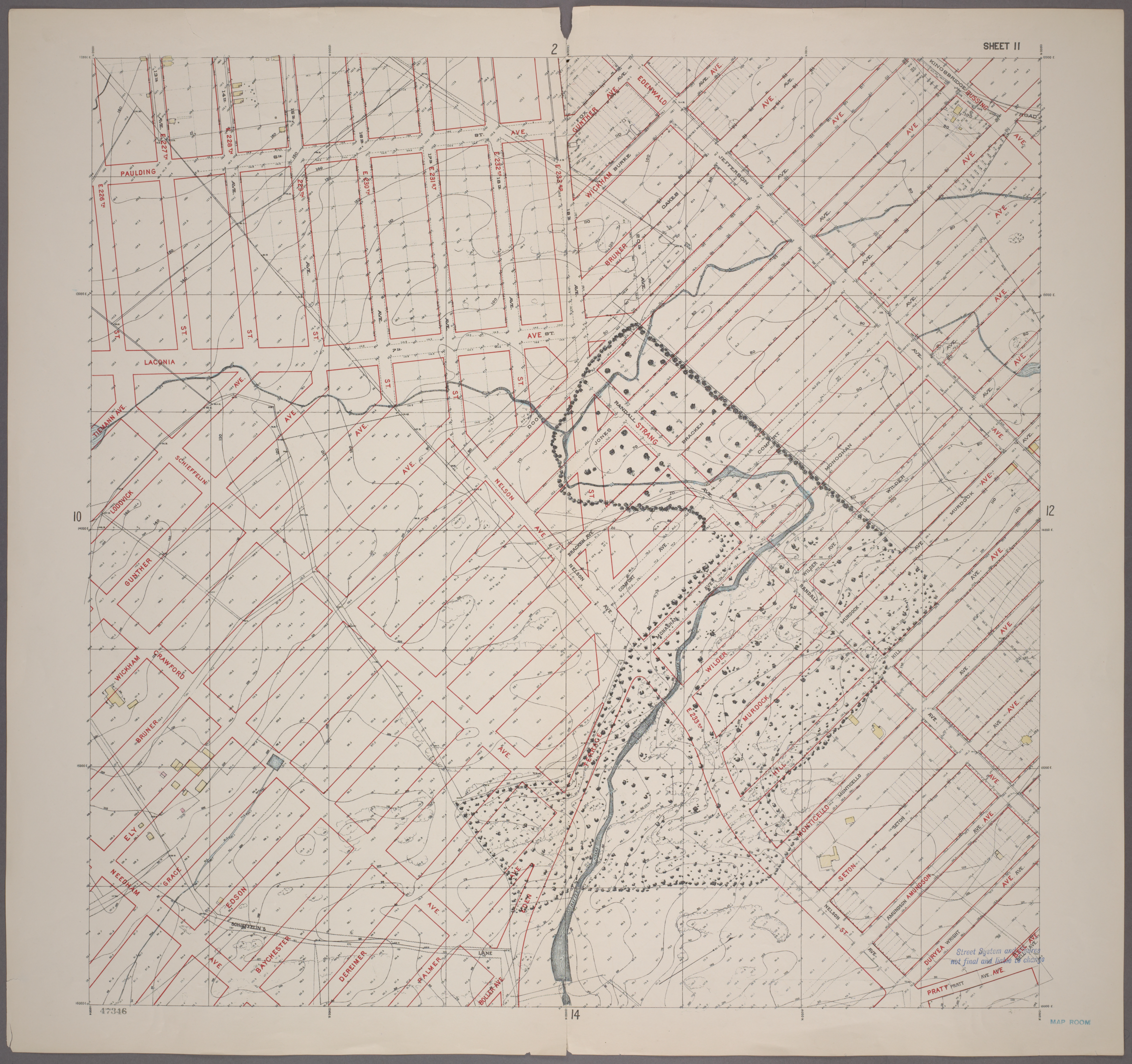
Map of Rattlesnake Creek in 1905

Rattlesnake Creek (Rattlesnake Brook in some sources) is an underground waterway in the northeast Bronx, New York City. It flowed above ground level until the mid-20th century, with a waterfall and a pond over its course. Rattlesnake Creek has since been mostly covered over, but a small portion of it is still visible in Seton Falls Park.

== Course ==
According to old maps, the source of the creek was near Nereid and Hill Avenues in the Bronx's Wakefield neighborhood, where it flows southwest, then turns southeast near East 233rd Street. It then flows above ground at Seton Falls Park, entering a man-made waterfall. After exiting the park, it flows back underground. South of Boston Road, the creek flowed into a 15-acre (6.1 ha) man-made pond called Holler's Pond, located at the site of the Boston Secor Houses in the Eastchester neighborhood. Rattlesnake Creek then passes through Co-op City, draining into the Hutchinson River. Before draining into the Hutchinson River, it split into two small distributaries, one of which was named Mill Creek.

The majority of Co-op City was built atop the mouth of Rattlesnake Creek. Some streets such as Alcott Place, Bellamy Loop, and Dreiser Loop directly follow the creek's path. A small nature preserve called the Givans Creek Woods is located at the northern portion of Co-op City, near the intersection of Baychester Avenue and Co-op City Boulevard. Despite its name, which is derived from Scottish immigrant Robert Givan, it is located above Rattlesnake Creek. The actual Givans Creek is located slightly to the south.

== Etymology ==
There was once an abundant population of rattlesnakes in the northeast Bronx, after which the creek is named. The rattlesnake population was identified as a problem in the late 18th century, when Eastchester town officials agreed to meet once a week to discuss the eradication of the snakes. According to a Bronx historian, Eastchester's ten founding families dedicated one day each spring "for the destroying of rattlesnake", using hogs to hunt down the rattlesnakes because the hogs' fat was resistant to the snakes' fangs. By the early 20th century, the snake population had been eliminated. However, some sources put their eradication at an earlier date, saying that the last snake was a 6-foot-long (1.8 m) specimen killed in 1775.

== History ==
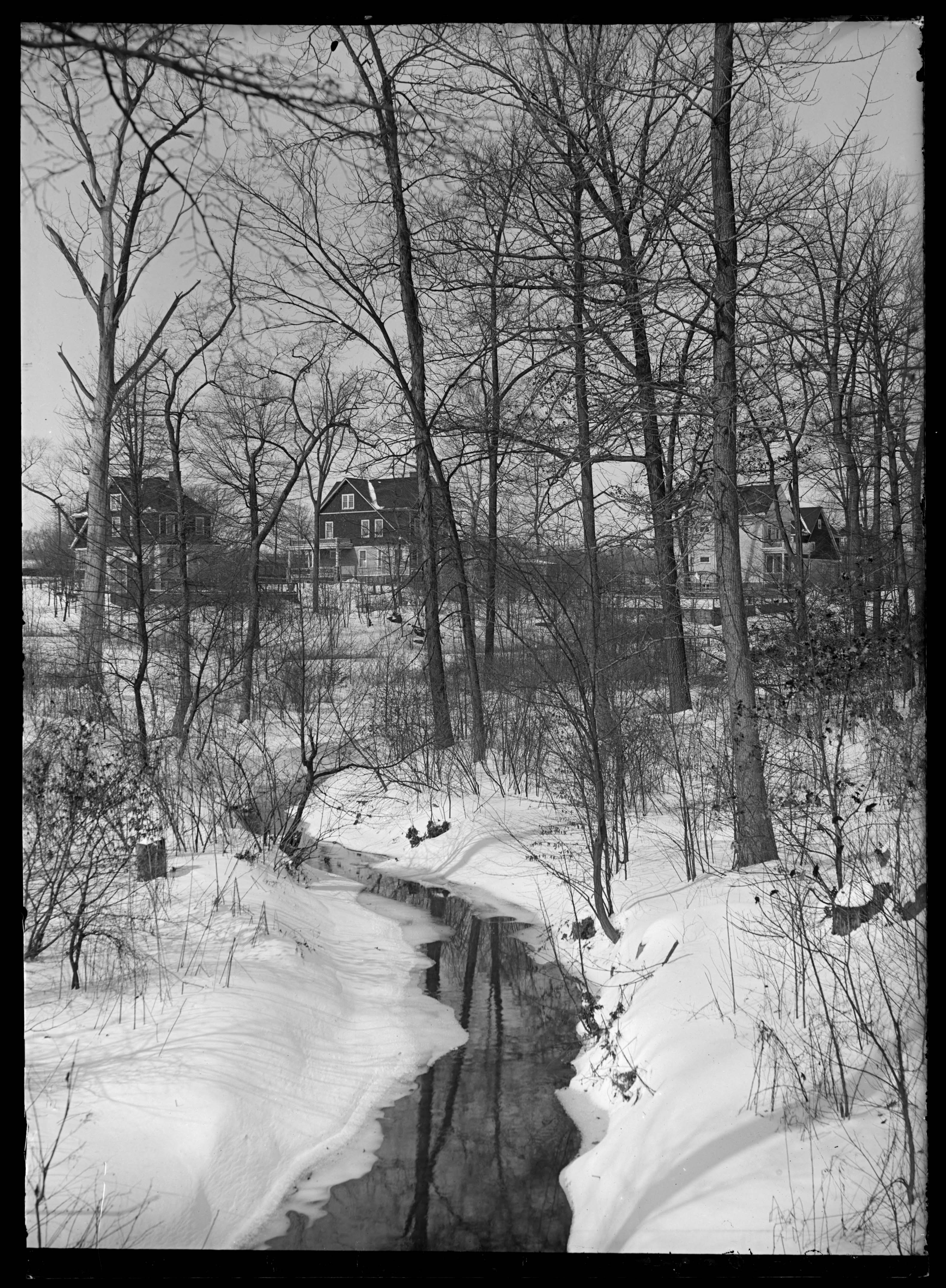
Rattlesnake Brook, 1914

Prior to the American Revolutionary War, the area around Rattlesnake Creek was owned by Thomas Pell. In 1739, Thomas Shute and Joseph Stanton built a mill to dam the creek south of Boston Road, creating Holler's Pond. Further upstream, the creek was dammed by William Seton, son of Saint Elizabeth Ann Seton, who owned the land around what is now Seton Falls Park in the mid-19th century. This created two more ponds and a waterfall. Seton's mill was destroyed in a 1900 storm, but the waterfall remained. The cascade was described as a 30-foot (9.1 m) descent with two separate falls. Also located along the brook may have been the estate of Anne Hutchinson, which according to a 1929 map was located in Baychester between Rattlesnake Creek and a now-filled stream called Black Dog Brook.

By 1926, Rattlesnake Creek was polluted and several cases of typhoid could be traced to the creek. After Seton Falls Park was acquired by the New York City Department of Parks and Recreation in 1930, the agency rerouted the creek's path within the park into a stone channel and infilled the two ponds on the Seton estate. Downstream, Holler's Pond was used to harvest ice, and there were several ice houses on the shore of the pond, which were all demolished by 1935. The pond was also popular among ice-skaters until it was infilled in 1951. Boston-Secor Houses was built over the infilled pond in 1968. There was a wood-framed beer garden on the shore of the pond, at 4018 Boston Road near the intersection with Dyre Avenue, which was demolished in 1960.

The mouth of the creek was covered in 1960 by Freedomland U.S.A., a theme park dedicated to the history of the United States. Before Freedomland's construction, that land had been a municipal landfill built atop the marshland on the banks of the Hutchinson River. The construction of Freedomland resulted in drastic landscaping changes around the mouth of the creek. Freedomland was shuttered in 1964 and its site was used for the development of Co-op City.

Rattlesnake Creek remains mostly extant, albeit in underground pipes. The only remaining above-ground section of the creek upstream is in Seton Falls Park. Within the park, an exit culvert from the creek was destroyed in 1973, creating a swamp that killed nearby trees, though the culvert and a sewer pipe under it were restored in the mid-1980s. A vestige of the old Holler's Pond mill's existence is Reeds Mill Lane, a discontinuous road between Boston Road and the New England Thruway, which cuts an irregular route through the Baychester street grid.
