= John Philip Sousa Junior High School (Bronx) =

Coordinates: 40°53′09″N 73°50′26″W

Location
- 3750 Baychester Avenue; The Bronx, New York 10466; United States

Information
- Founded: 1958-1959
- Status: Defunct
- Closed: 2015
- School district: New York City Geographical District 11
- School number: 142
- Teaching staff: 13
- Grades: 6-8 (formerly 7-9)

John Philip Sousa Junior High School (also known as JHS 142, MS 142 and John Philip Sousa Middle School) was a middle school located on Baychester Avenue, across the street from Cardinal Spellman High School, in the Edenwald section of the Bronx in New York City, adjacent to Seton Falls Park. The school was named after John Philip Sousa and opened in 1958 or 1959. The school celebrated its golden jubilee in December 2008. After the school's closing in 2015, JHS 142's building became an educational campus.

== Academic standards ==
The school had the city's only Korean language class.

== History ==
The school opened in either 1958 or 1959 at a cost of $3.6 million. Early in 1960, student Gail Bartley received a letter from Soviet Premier Nikita Khrushchev after she asked him to contribute something to the school's yearbook for its inaugural graduating class. Khrushchev was the only world leader to have replied to students (U.S. President Dwight Eisenhower never replied) after they started a letter-writing campaign asking for a written contribution to be included in the first yearbook at the school. The contribution, which was delivered in person by a Soviet diplomatic officer based in New York, was rejected by the New York City Department of Education for unknown reasons.

By 1961, there were allegations that the school building had serious defects. Cinder blocks had broken apart and fallen across the auditorium in 1960, though no one was injured. One engineer said that when the building opened, it had 1,200 defects. The defects were investigated by the Bronx County District Attorney.

In October 2010, it was announced that the school was on the New York City Department of Education's shortlist of schools potentially targeted for closing. It was one of five schools in the Bronx to be on the list, and the only middle school in the borough scheduled to be closed due to poor academic performance. Plans were to split the school into two smaller middle schools, Middle School 529 and Middle School 532. On 26 April 2012, the city's Board of Election voted to close the school after the last graduating class graduates in June 2012. On May 11, 2012, the city announced that school would be reopened in the Fall 2012 as the North Bronx Academy, bringing to an end Sousa's 54-year-old history. However, on June 29, 2012, a ruling by a legal arbitrator announced that all 24 schools slated to close under the city's "Turn Around" program had to remain open. The ruling halted a central element of Mayor Michael Bloomberg's plans for closing and reopening the affected schools, saying its method for overhauling the staff at those institutions violated existing labor contracts. The school finally closed in June 2015 and its building was reused for an educational campus.

== Notable alumni ==
- Emmy Andujar - professional basketball player and member of the Puerto Rico national basketball team. Raised in the Edenwald Houses.
- Jeannette Bayardelle, actress best known for playing Celie in the Broadway musical The Color Purple
- Adolfo Carrión, Jr., Bronx borough president
- DreamDoll (born Tabatha Robinson), rapper/reality television personality (VH1 series "Bad Girls Club" and "Love & Hip Hop: New York"). Raised in the Edenwald Houses.
- Sam Garnes, professional football player (New York Giants)
- Andy González - Latin jazz musician who was raised in the Edenwald Houses. Brother of Jerry González
- Jerry Gonzalez - Latin jazz musician. Grew up in the Edenwald Houses. Brother of Andy González
- Eric Mobley - professional basketball player for the Milwaukee Bucks
- Durand Scott, basketball player for Maccabi Ashdod B.C. of the Liga Leumit
