= Sam Garnes =

American football player and coach (born 1974)

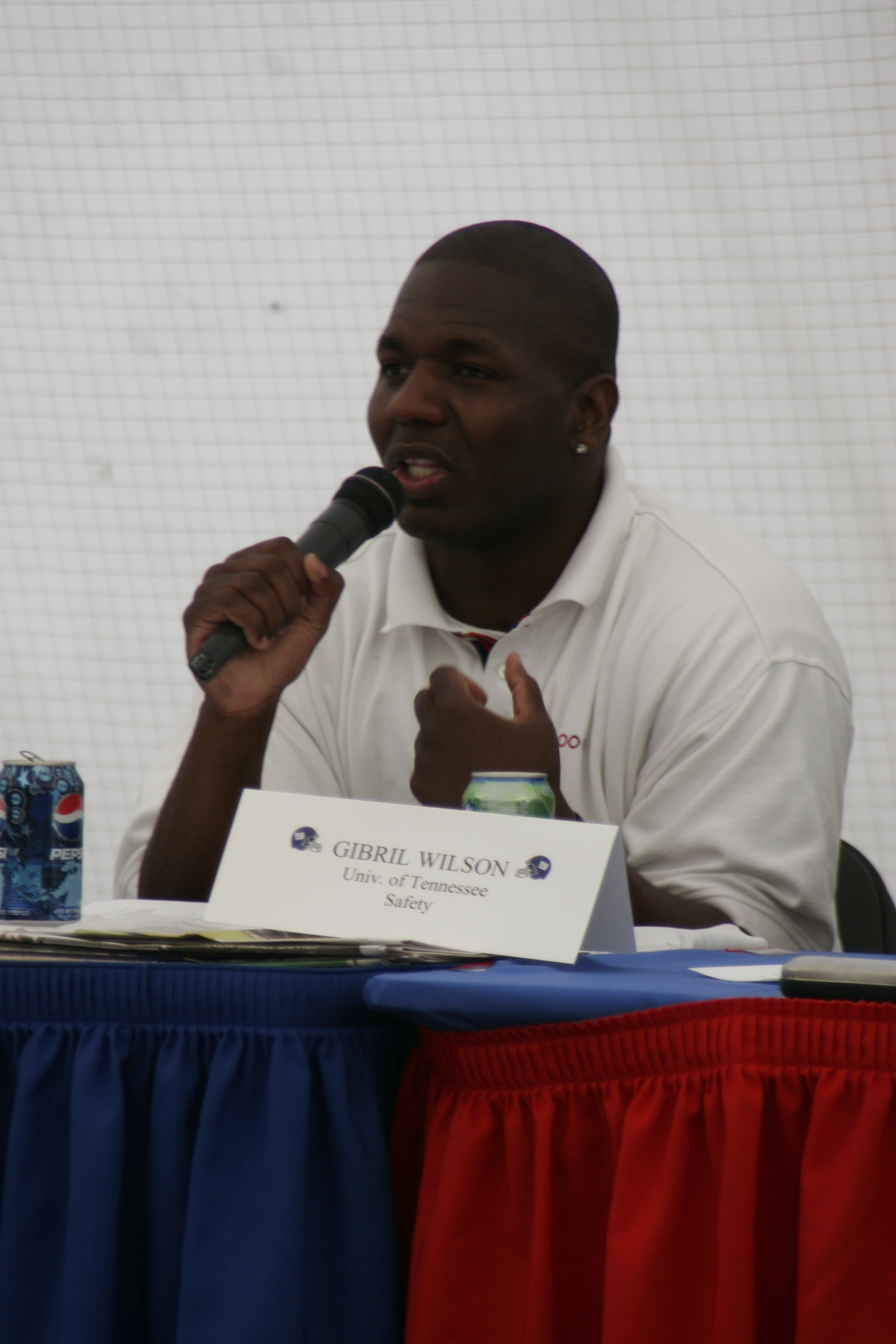
- Garnes in 2007

No. 20, 42
- Position: Safety

Personal information
- Born: July 12, 1974 (age 52); The Bronx, New York, U.S.
- Listed height: 6 ft 3 in (1.91 m)
- Listed weight: 225 lb (102 kg)

Career information
- High school: DeWitt Clinton (Bronx)
- College: Cincinnati
- NFL draft: 1997: 5th round, 136th overall pick

Career history

Playing
- New York Giants (1997–2001); New York Jets (2002–2003)

Coaching
- Emerson High School (2005) Defensive coordinator; Cologne Centurions (2006) Defensive backs coach; Las Vegas Locomotives (2009) Defensive backs coach); Carolina Panthers (2010) Special teams assistant); Denver Broncos (2011–2014) Assistant secondary coach; Chicago Bears (2015–2016) Assistant secondary coach

Awards and highlights
- UFL champion (2009)

Career NFL statistics
- Tackles: 515
- Sacks: 3
- Forced fumbles: 4
- Fumble recoveries: 2
- Interceptions: 10
- Defensive touchdowns: 1
- Stats at Pro Football Reference

Samuel Aaron Garnes (born July 12, 1974) is an American former professional football player who was a defensive back and coach in the National Football League (NFL). He is currently a radio personality on The Ryan Show FM.

The New York Giants selected him New York Giants in the fifth round of the 1997 NFL draft. A native of the Bronx, Garnes is an alumnus of John Philip Sousa Junior High School located in the Edenwald section of that borough. Garnes currently resides in Fort Lee, New Jersey.

In 2011, Garnes became an assistant secondary coach for the Denver Broncos.

The Broncos’ secondary in 2013 overcame numerous injuries to its personnel, including extended periods without 12-time Pro Bowl cornerback Champ Bailey and starting safety Rahim Moore. In their absence, cornerback Chris Harris Jr. became a steadying force on the outside, and second-year safety Duke Ihenacho emerged as a solid contributor in the defensive backfield.

He joined the Chicago Bears' coaching staff as an assistant secondary coach in 2015, but was let go after the 2016 season.

In 2019, he became a Sports Analyst on the nationally syndicated radio program, The Ryan Show FM.

Pre-draft measurables
Height	Weight	Arm length	Hand span	40-yard dash	10-yard split	20-yard split	20-yard shuttle	Vertical jump	Broad jump	Bench press
6 ft 3 1/8 in (1.91 m)	225 lb (102 kg)	32 5/8 in (0.83 m)	9 3/4 in (0.25 m)	4.78 s	1.67 s	2.79 s	4.38 s	30.5 in (0.77 m)	8 ft 6 in (2.59 m)	14 reps

== NFL career statistics ==
Legend
**Bold**	Career high

=== Regular season ===
Year	Team	Games		Tackles				Interceptions				Fumbles			
Year	Team	GP	GS	Comb	Solo	Ast	Sck	Int	Yds	TD	Lng	FF	FR	Yds	TD
1997	NYG	16	15	59	40	19	0.0	1	**95**	**1**	**95**	0	0	0	0
1998	NYG	11	11	49	37	12	0.0	1	13	0	13	0	0	0	0
1999	NYG	16	16	95	**77**	18	**1.0**	**2**	7	0	4	1	0	0	0
2000	NYG	15	15	64	52	12	**1.0**	1	4	0	4	1	0	0	0
2001	NYG	16	16	74	59	15	0.0	1	5	0	5	0	0	0	0
2002	NYJ	16	16	74	59	15	0.5	**2**	65	0	65	0	**1**	0	0
2003	NYJ	16	16	**100**	67	**33**	0.5	**2**	0	0	0	**2**	**1**	0	0
		106	105	515	391	124	3.0	10	189	1	95	4	2	0	0

=== Playoffs ===
Year	Team	Games		Tackles				Interceptions				Fumbles			
Year	Team	GP	GS	Comb	Solo	Ast	Sck	Int	Yds	TD	Lng	FF	FR	Yds	TD
1997	NYG	1	1	5	4	1	0.0	0	0	0	0	0	0	0	0
2000	NYG	3	3	**13**	**10**	**3**	0.0	**1**	**13**	0	**13**	0	0	0	0
2002	NYJ	2	2	9	6	**3**	0.0	0	0	0	0	0	0	0	0
		6	6	27	20	7	0.0	1	13	0	13	0	0	0	0
