= Lakeyah =

American rapper

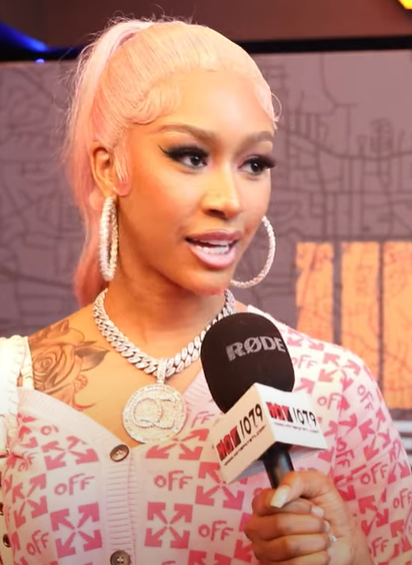
- Lakeyah in 2022

Background information
- Born: Lakeyah Danaee Robinson; February 28, 2001 (age 25); Milwaukee, Wisconsin, U.S.
- Genre: Hip-Hop
- Occupations: Actress Rapper; singer; television personality
- Years active: 2020–present
- Label: Makasounds Records Quality Control
- Formerly of: BTM (2017–2020)
- Partner: Khiante Hardy (2020–2025)

Lakeyah Danaee Robinson (born February 28, 2001), known mononymously as Lakeyah, is an American rapper, singer, and television personality. Born and raised in Milwaukee, she began recording at the age of 15. At 18, she moved to Atlanta and was signed to Quality Control Music. She was part of the XXL magazine 2021 freshman class, as the first inductee to hail from Milwaukee.

== Early life ==
Lakeyah Danaee Robinson was born on February 28, 2001, in Milwaukee, where she was also raised. In high school, she began on the slam poetry team before she was convinced by friends at the age of 15 to rap for the #SoGoneChallenge where people submit performances of rap verses to the instrumental of the song "So Gone" by Monica.

In 2017, she joined the music duo "BTM" (Beyond the Music) and they achieved over one million YouTube views.

In 2019, she went on a birthday trip for her 18th birthday to Atlanta, Georgia and visited rapper T.I.'s Trap Museum and its exhibit on Quality Control Music. Inspired to move to Atlanta, she enrolled at the Art Institute of Atlanta for college but dropped out after two months.

== Career ==
Lakeyah stayed in Atlanta after dropping out of college and went viral for the #FirstDayOutChallenge, a rap challenge celebrating rapper JT from the female rap group City Girls being released from prison. After that challenge and going viral from a freestyle over the song "We Paid" by 42 Dugg and Lil Baby, she was signed to Quality Control Music. On October 9, 2020, Lakeyah released her first single, "Big FlexHER", featuring 42 Dugg. It amassed over 400,000 views in five days and currently has over six million views.

On December 11, 2020, Lakeyah released her debut album, Time's Up. It included the singles "Female Goat" featuring City Girls and "Worst Thing". "Female Goat" is Lakeyah's most popular track on YouTube, with over 25 million views.

In the spring of 2021, Lakeyah was named a brand ambassador for Rihanna's lingerie line, Savage X Fenty.

On April 9, 2021, Lakeyah released her second project, In Due Time. The album included features from Gucci Mane and Yung Bleu. After the album's release, Lakeyah was 4th on Rolling Stone's Breakthrough 25 charts, which ranks the fastest rising new artists, behind Cico P.

On June 16, 2021, XXL magazine named Lakeyah to the 2021 XXL Freshman Class, a spotlight for up and coming rappers that previously featured Kendrick Lamar, Travis Scott, Chance the Rapper, and Megan thee Stallion. She was the first Milwaukee rapper named an XXL freshman in its 14-year history. The same year she also released a mixtape entitled My Time with the single "313-414" featuring Detroit rapper Tee Grizzley. The mixtape is part of the Gangsta Grillz series hosted by DJ Drama. The artwork depicts Lakeyah holding a championship trophy dressed in a Milwaukee Bucks jersey which is a tribute to her hometown and winners of the NBA Championship that same year.

In 2022 Lakeyah was cast as a regular on the BET reality show The Impact: Atlanta season 1 and season 2. She also released two more projects No Pressure Part 1 and No Pressure Part 2 with the singles "Mind Yo Business" featuring Latto and "Real Bitch" featuring Gloss Up. The projects also featured collaborations with Lucky Daye, Flo Milli and Layton Greene.

On November 18, 2024, Lakeyah released the single "F.Y.T." featuring singer Jacquees. It was later featured on her mixtape Keymix lll.

== Personal life ==
Lakeyah said she was a lesbian in a 2020 interview with DJ Smallz. In 2026, she came out as bisexual as a guest on the podcast Respectfully Justin.

== Discography ==
=== Mixtapes ===
List of mixtapes, with selected details
Title	Mixtape details
Time's Up	Released: October 9, 2020; Label: Quality Control Music; Format: Digital download, streaming
In Due Time	Released: April 9, 2021; Label: Quality Control Music; Format: Digital download, streaming
My Time (Gangsta Grillz: Special Edition)	Released: September 24, 2021; Label: Quality Control Music; Format: Digital download, streaming
Keymix lll	Released: November 30, 2024; Label: Makasounds Records YFM; Format: Digital download, streaming

=== EPs ===
List of extended plays, with selected details
Title	Details
No Pressure (Pt. 1)	Released: June 17, 2022; Label: Quality Control, Motown; Format: Digital download, streaming
No Pressure (Pt. 2)	Released: September 23, 2022; Label: Quality Control, Motown; Format: Digital download, streaming

=== Singles ===
==== As lead artist ====
Title	Year	Album
"Big FlexHer" (featuring 42 Dugg)	2020	Time's Up
"Windows"	2020	Time's Up
"Female Goat" (featuring City Girls)	2020	Time's Up
"Poppin" (featuring Gucci Mane)	2021	In Due Time
"Perfect" (with Yung Bleu)	2021	In Due Time
"Easy"	2021	In Due Time
"Too Much"	2021	In Due Time
"I Look Good"	2022	No Pressure (Pt. 1)
"Mind Yo Business" (featuring Latto)	2022	No Pressure (Pt. 1)
"Real B***h" (with Gloss Up)	2022	No Pressure (Pt. 2)
"F.Y.T." (with Jacquees)	2024	Keymix lll

| scope=”row” | Herskii” {{small| |2026
