= Murder of Minerliz Soriano =

1999 child murder in New York City

Minerliz "Minnie" Soriano
- Disappeared: February 24, 1999; Eastchester, Bronx, New York City
- Status: Murdered
- Died: February 24–28, 1999
- Cause of death: Strangulation

On February 28, 1999, the body of 13-year-old Minerliz "Minnie" Soriano was found bound and wrapped inside a garbage bag, dumped inside a garbage dumpster behind a video store in the Co-op City section of the Bronx, New York City. She had been strangled and sexually abused, and missing for three days after leaving her middle school. Her case went unsolved for twenty-two years until police, aided by advanced DNA technology, arrested a suspect in November 2021.

It was the first time in New York City that a case was solved using familial DNA analysis.

== Investigation ==
The key piece of evidence in the case was a semen stain found on Soriano's sweatshirt which was preserved since 1999. In 2019, the sample was run through the New York State convicted offender DNA database (CODIS) and linked the DNA to the suspect's deceased father. Investigators later obtained a sample of a suspect's DNA and matched the sample to him.

== Accused ==
In 2021, New Rochelle resident Joseph Martinez was arrested and charged with two counts of second-degree murder, for the sexual assault and strangulation of Soriano between February 24–28, 1999. He had become a prime suspect in the case through the relatively new technique of familial DNA analysis. Although Martinez's DNA was not in any criminal database, his father's DNA was, due to an arrest years earlier. In 2019, a familial DNA search indicated that the father, by then deceased, was a close relative of the person whose semen had been found on Soriano's sweatshirt. With the possible suspects narrowed to only a few, the police later covertly collected Martinez's DNA, which proved an exact match to that of the semen.

As a hobby, Martinez taught children about astronomy, setting up a powerful telescope on busy sidewalks and offering views and lessons to those who wanted. In 1999, he lived in the same building as Soriano.

After a trial that lasted over a month, a Bronx court jury found Martinez guilty of Minerliz's murder on November 14, 2025. On March 26, 2026, Martinez was sentenced to 25 years to life in prison.
