= Ah Ah Ah (song) =

Single by DreamDoll, Fivio Foreign
- Released: July 10, 2020
- Genre: Drill, Rap
- Length: 3:13
- Label: District 18/RCA Records

Ah Ah Ah is a song by American rapper and songwriter, DreamDoll featuring rapper Fivio Foreign. The song was released on July 10, 2020.

== Background ==
The song uses Drill music elements. The song also reflects her time in The Bronx and her previous job as a stripper. According to an Instagram post she mentioned, “Not to bring this up Right now but I’m so glad that I took the whole of 2019 off to work on my artistry, my flow, my delivery, my tone, just overall being better at my craft and all my hard work is paying off it feels so good to get the recognition I deserve I appreciate everyone finally, and I’m so grateful.”

In a press release on LA Weekly, they describe her rapping as “Effortless flow and unparalleled sense of rhythm that she pushes forward with not only a towering sense of beauty.”

== Chart performance ==
The song was number 23 on the Billboard R&B/Hip-Hip Digital Songs Sales chart for two weeks.
