= Seton Falls Park =

Public park in the Bronx, New York

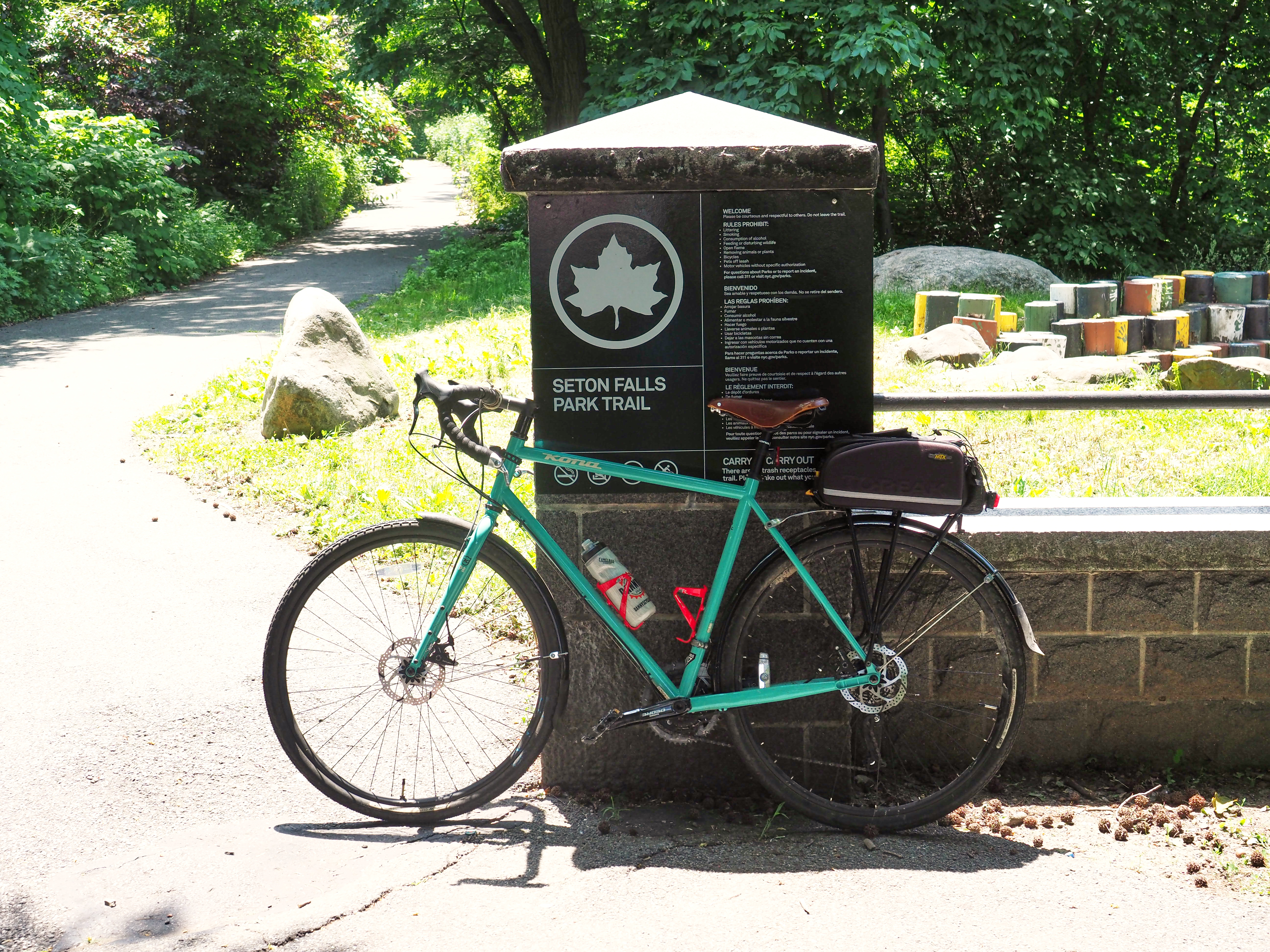
- Entrance to Seton Falls Park
- Interactive map of Seton Falls Park
- Location: The Bronx, New York, United States
- Coordinates: 40°53′13″N 73°50′16″W
- Area: 35 acres (14 ha)
- Authorized: June 11, 1930
- Owner: NYC Parks
- Hiking trails: yes
- Terrain: wooded
- Public transit: Bus: Bx16, Bx30; Subway: 5 train at Eastchester–Dyre Avenue
- Website: https://www.nycgovparks.org/parks/seton-falls-park

Seton Falls Park is a 36-acre (15 ha) wooded area in the Edenwald area of The Bronx in New York City. The park is named after the Seton family (of which Elizabeth Ann Seton was a member), who owned the land in the 19th century.

Seton Falls Park is located southeast of the intersection of East 233rd Street and Baychester Avenue. It contains a playground and athletic fields, as well as the only above-ground section of a small creek called Rattlesnake Brook. Due to its seclusion, the park site has been used for dumping in the past, and several corpses have been left there.

Seton Falls Park's site was occupied by the Siwanoy tribe of Native Americans prior to European settlement in the 17th century. The land was later owned by several individuals, including a Roosevelt family ancestor, before being passed to the Seton family via marriage. The Seton family estate and surrounding area was annexed by New York City in 1894, and the city acquired land on the site in 1914, officially designating it as a parkland in 1930. The New York City Department of Parks and Recreation (NYC Parks) subsequently added recreational facilities to Seton Falls Park. After a period of disrepair in the late 20th century, Seton Falls Park was restored.

== Description ==
The park, operated by the New York City Department of Parks and Recreation (NYC Parks), covers 35 acres (14 ha) in the Edenwald section of the northeast Bronx, near New York City's border with the town of Mount Vernon, New York. It is bounded by East 233rd Street on the north, Baychester Avenue on the west, Crawford Avenue and Marolla Place on the south, Pratt Avenue on the southeast, and private property on the east. The campus of the former John Philip Sousa School (JHS 142), as well as PS 111, occupies a portion of the western boundary. The site is near the Eastchester–Dyre Avenue station of the New York City Subway's 5 train (formerly of the New York, Westchester and Boston Railway).

=== Geographic features ===
The park is traversed by Rattlesnake Brook, a small creek that originally emptied into Eastchester Bay and is now mostly covered over. The section of the creek through the park is the only portion of the creek that is still above ground. The brook's course contains a waterfall within the park. While the brook itself is naturally fed, the waterfall is artificial. The creek flows from west to east, and there are several walking paths around the brook.

Seton Falls Park contains the Seton Falls Park Preserve. The wildlife preserve serves as a habitat for over 30 bird species. There are cattail marshes, sedge meadows, and floodplain forests along the creek's path. There are oak-hickory forests in the higher portions of the park. Frogs, turtles, and waterfowl can also be seen in the park.

=== Recreational features ===
Seton Falls Park contains High Rock Playground at its northwest corner. At the park's southwest corner is Stars & Stripes Playground, which contains handball courts and basketball courts as well as a children's play area. The latter is jointly operated by NYC Parks and the New York City Department of Education (NYCDOE). In the past, there was also a baseball field in the park.

== History ==
=== Site ===
Prior to the park's development, the region had many oak, chestnut, hickory, and walnut trees, as well as caves and other settlements occupied by the Siwanoy tribe of Native Americans. There was a crevice that could supposedly conceal several people; a series of half-natural, half-man-made "Indian Fortifications", and a large cave on the ground. In 1654, the surrounding land was purchased by Thomas Pell. After Pell died, his nephew Sir John Pell was given permission to build a mill on Rattlesnake Brook in 1696. During the American Revolutionary War, in 1781, a skirmish between British and American troops took place in what is now the park's site. By 1790, the land comprising present-day Seton Falls Park had been deforested.

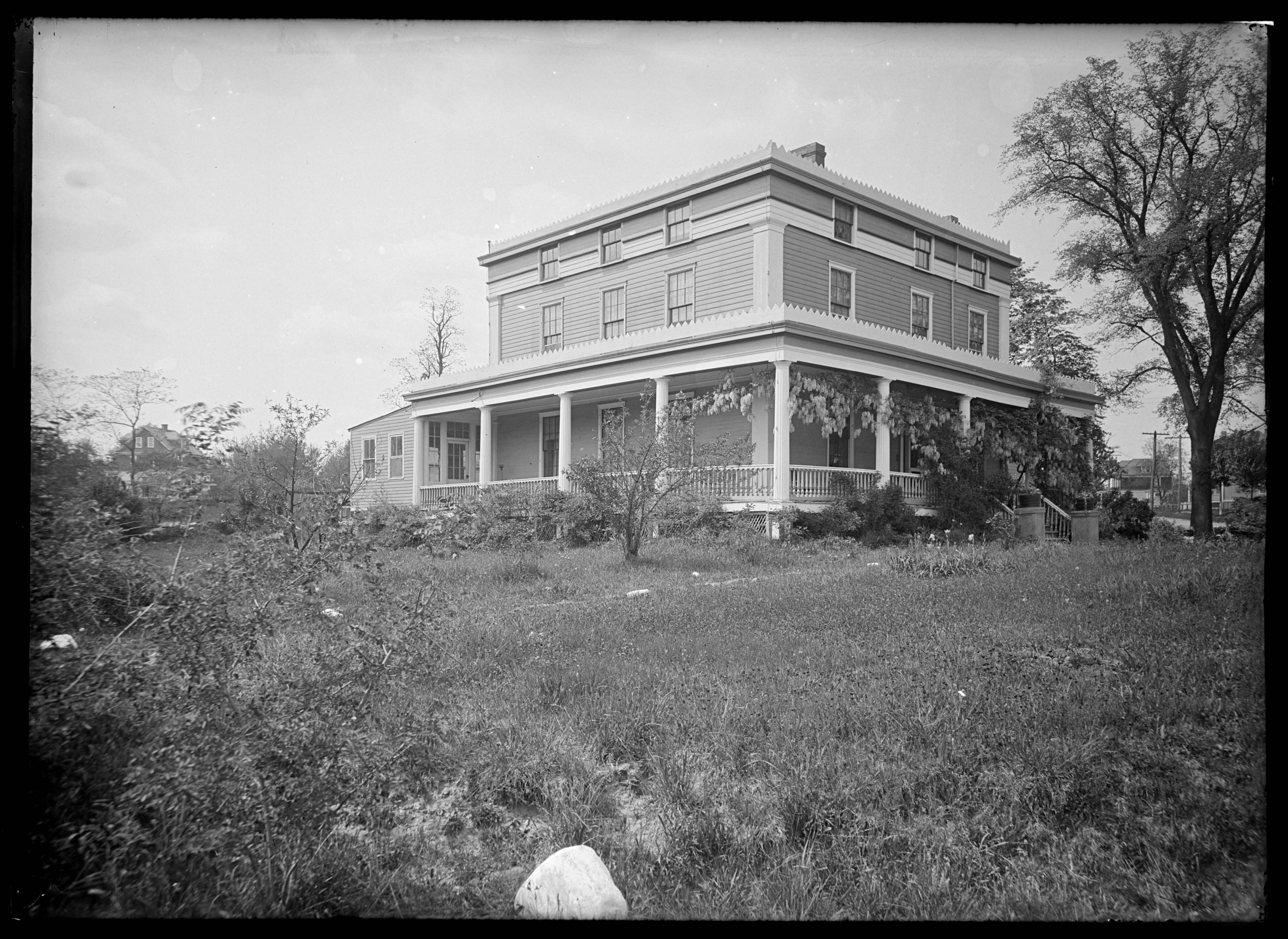
Seton family home on the park site

According to NYC Parks, after the Revolutionary War, ownership of the park site passed to James Roosevelt, a member of the Roosevelt family. City tax records show that in 1817, merchant David Cargill Jr. sold a 124-acre (50 ha) parcel of the parkland to carpenter Thomas Secord, who resold it to George Miller in 1821. However, the tax records do not mention who owned the site before Cargill. The banker Nathaniel Prime acquired title to the land in 1835, and later gave it to his daughter Emily, who married Saint Elizabeth Ann Seton's son William Seton. The estate became known as The Cedars, and later as Cragdon, due to the property's abundance of red cedar trees. William Seton cut down many of the trees and dammed Rattlesnake Creek, creating two ponds and a waterfall. He also planted many elm and larch trees. The mansion on the estate, located near the cave, was described as being similar to Hamilton Grange, the old Manhattan estate of U.S. treasury secretary Alexander Hamilton.

During the time of the Great Famine of Ireland, Seton sent sacks of meal and flour and potatoes and barrels of apples from the estate to a relief ship loading in New York Harbor. William and Emily Seton had seven children, who had left the estate by 1860. For the next several decades, Cragdon was rented out, but not permanently occupied, and was affected by theft and vandalism. The land had been replanted with oak and elm trees by 1905. Seton's mill was destroyed in a 1900 storm, but the waterfall remained. The cascade was described as a 30-foot (9.1 m) descent with two separate falls.

=== Park establishment ===
The parkland and surrounding area was annexed by New York City in 1894, and the Seton estate was broken up into lots. The next year, the Setons held an auction to sell off the land, though some lots went unsold. According to tax records, most of the land comprising Seton Falls Park was sold to a developer in 1906, but some of the land was so steep as to be unusable for development. By the first decade of the 20th century, the old Cragdon estate was being used unofficially as a park. Among those who frequented the area were picnickers, artists, and couples on romantic retreats. The estate's cave was frequented by picnickers.

The city selected the Seton estate in April 1914 as the site for a new contagious-disease hospital. The original sale price of $135,000 was negotiated down to $82,500. In June 1914, the city acquired title to between 32 and 33 acres (13 and 13 ha) of land on the Seton estate. For the next fifteen years, the city tried to develop the land as a hospital, though residents opposed the move. After failing to sell the lot in 1922, the city transferred ownership of the land to the Sinking Fund Commission in 1929, and the commission transferred ownership to NYC Parks on June 11, 1930. Another 3 acres (1.2 ha) were ceded to the city in 1932. (Note: It is unclear whether the 3 acres (1.2 ha) ceded in 1932 was the remaining portion acquired by the city in 1914, or whether it was a new acquisition. NYC Parks states that 29 acres (12 ha) had been ceded as parkland in June 1930. However, Robert Loeb (1989) and Bill Twomey (2007) say that the three acres were ceded in 1932 as new additions to the 32-acre park.)

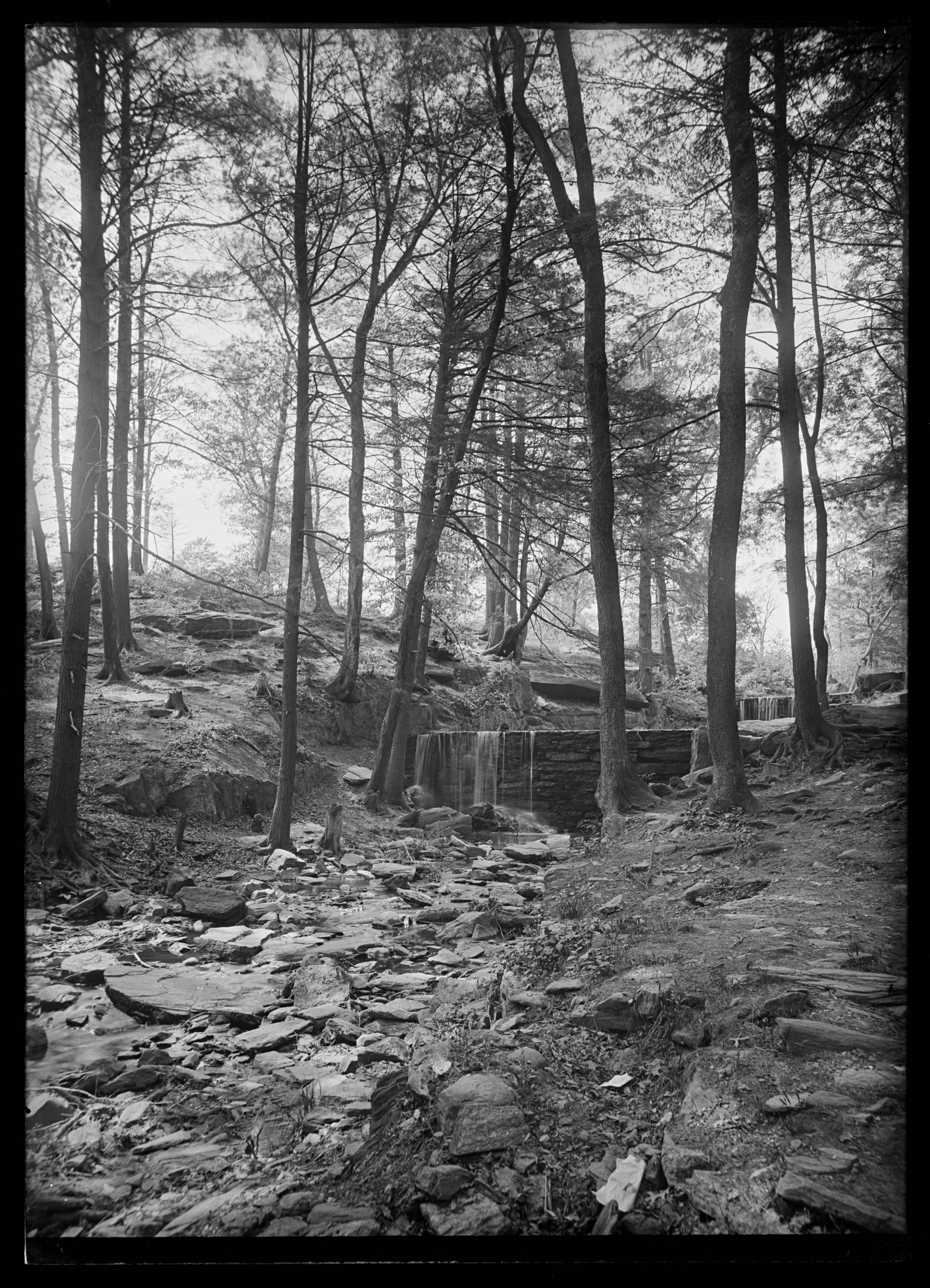
Seton Falls, 1913

NYC Parks subsequently began adding amenities including fountains, benches, outhouses, and a baseball field to Seton Falls Park. In addition, Rattlesnake Creek was placed into a stone channel and the two ponds on the Seton estate were infilled. According to maps drawn by NYC Parks, the trees from the late 19th century were preserved and had grown into a mature forest. In 1941, parks commissioner Robert Moses announced that he wanted "to expand Seton Falls Park to the west". Some 12.5 acres (5.1 ha) were acquired by the New York City Board of Estimate for this purpose. The land was instead developed as JHS 142, which opened in 1958 or 1959. The adjacent Stars & Stripes Playground opened in 1961.

=== Degradation and cleanup ===
The development of the northeast Bronx led to increased use of the park, which in turn led to degradation of the landscape. A Community Planning Board report in 1967 advocated for cleaning the park, though the report did not recommend adding active recreational facilities. By 1970, Seton Falls Park was in disrepair. Garbage blocked the flow of Rattlesnake Creek, there was a high rate of vandalism, and picnickers had long stopped going to the park. A civic leader said that the park's condition was "because of almost criminal neglect by the Parks administration and because of the dumpers and night riders who don't give a damn for the health and safety of other people". Rattlesnake Creek's exit culvert was destroyed in 1973, which caused a backup of water flows and eventually created a swamp that killed the trees along the creek. In response to the degradation of the park, the city government considered a renovation project in 1974, though the renovation was delayed due to the 1975 New York City fiscal crisis. This resulted in further degradation, including rampant dumping.

Design for Seton Falls Park's restoration was commenced in 1978. When NYC Parks had opened bidding for renovation in 1974, several contractors submitted plans that were to cost millions of dollars. NYC Parks, intending to save money, devised its own design that would only cost $800,000. The first phase of renovation, completed in 1981, cost $250,000 and resulted in the diversion of Rattlesnake Creek into the city's sewer system. Subsequently, a broken sewer line under Rattlesnake Creek's destroyed exit culvert was repaired, as was the culvert itself. Additionally, the park gained land in 1983 and 1985; the NYCDOE transferred the land around JHS 142 to NYC Parks so that a fence could be erected around the park's forest. The second phase of reconstruction started in December 1986. Peter Dunleavy, who designed the landscape plan for the park's reconstruction, won a 1985 "excellence in design" award from the New York City Art Commission.

In 1990, NYC Parks announced that it would restore 24 acres (9.7 ha) in the park. The park had fallen into disuse by the mid-1990s, and New York Knicks forward Charles Oakley proposed converting Seton Falls Park into a mostly recreational facility. This plan was opposed by community activist Christine Foreman, who instead created the Seton Falls Park Preservation Coalition to clean up the park. With NYC Parks' help, the group submitted an application for funding and received $500,000 for the park's renovation. Seton Falls Park was restored between 2007 and 2008 with $905,000 provided by the Croton Filtration Plant Mitigation Fund. In exchange for constructing the Croton Water Filtration Plant under Van Cortlandt Park, the New York City Department of Environmental Protection paid for the restoration of trails and various other elements in Seton Falls Park. However, it again went into disrepair shortly thereafter: in 2010, the park was among the best in the city in terms of maintenance, but two years later, it was the second-worst.

In the 21st century, the park has been used for park-ranger tours, movie screenings, and protests. There have also been volunteer drives to remove invasive vegetation. In 2018, a skate park was proposed for Seton Falls Park.

== Crime and dumping ==
Due to Seton Falls Park's seclusion, it has been used as a dumping ground for several dead bodies. For example, in 1997, a man was charged with murder after a girl's dead body was found in the park. Other corpses found in the park include that of a man found in 2009 and the body of a missing woman in 2016. Animal corpses have also been left in the park, including that of a pit bull in 2015, which was presumed to have been involved in illegal dog-fighting. There have been other crimes that have taken place in Seton Falls Park: for instance, a man was arrested in 2015 after several instances of sexual abuse in the park.

Seton Falls Park has also been used for the dumping of other objects. For instance, after robbers stole eight bags of checks from a New York Central Railroad train in 1955, seven of the bags were later found in the park by a child picking berries. In the mid- and late 20th century, the park was used for dumping all types of garbage, and the soil was burned. Car thieves in particular frequented the park during the 1970s and 1980s. In a 1996 letter to mayor Rudy Giuliani, Oakley called the park "a very deep hole filled with trash and litter which during the summer months is occupied by drug addicts and prostitutes." Litter continued to be a problem for the park in the 21st century.
