= Edenwald Houses =

Public housing development in New York City

- NYCHA property
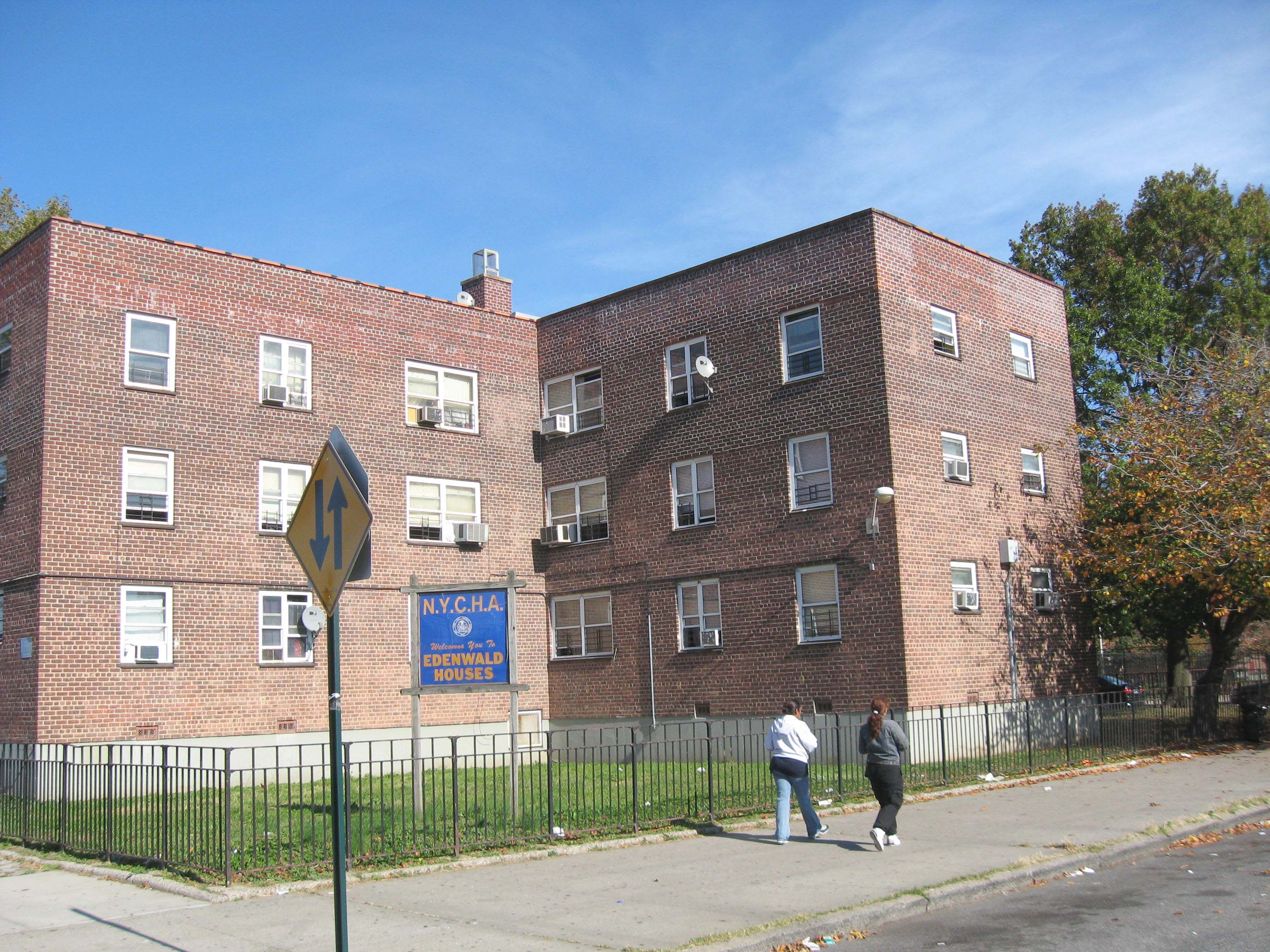
- Edenwald Houses, 2008
- Interactive map of Edenwald Houses
- Coordinates: 40.886310°N 73.845210°W
- Country: United States
- State: New York
- City: New York City
- Borough: The Bronx
- Community District: The Bronx 11

Area
  - Total: 0.076 sq mi (0.20 km^{2})

Population
  - Total: 5,032
  - Density: 66,000/sq mi (26,000/km^{2})
- Time zone: UTC−05:00 (Eastern (EST))
  - Summer (DST): UTC−04:00 (Eastern (EDT))
- ZIP codes: 10466
- Area codes: 718, 347, 929, and 917
- Website: NYCHA Portal

Edenwald Houses are a housing project in the Eastchester and Laconia neighborhoods of the Bronx, New York City. Established on October 30, 1953, the project consists of forty buildings, 3 and 14 stories tall with 2,039 apartment units. It covers a 48.88-acre development is bordered by Grenada Place, East 225th Street, Baychester Avenue, Schieffelin Avenue and Laconia Avenues. It is owned and managed by New York City Housing Authority (NYCHA) and is the largest development in the Bronx. The complex was listed on the National Register of Historic Places in 2024.

== Development ==
The Edenwald Houses were built on the former Hebrew Orphan Asylum and was designed by architects Rodgers & Butler. Paul Tishman Company started building Edenwald Houses in 1951 at a cost of roughly $12 million. At the dedication ceremony in 1952, Bronx Borough President James Lyons, Parks Commissioner Robert Moses, and Deputy Mayor Charles Horowitz all commended NYCHA on the development.

=== 21st-century crime ===
In the 2000s violence had increased greatly in the development due to two rival gangs. In 2014, the New York City Police Department (NYPD) began monitoring the gangs activities through social media accounts linked to the gangs. In 2016, the NYPD raided Edenwald and nearby Eastchester Gardens, arresting 87 individuals and charging 120, all of whom were members of two rival gangs. Their indictments constituted the largest drug-related arrests in the city's history, with indictments such as racketeering conspiracy, narcotics conspiracy, narcotics distribution, and firearms offenses. Residents of Edenwald Houses objected to how the raid was conducted and how the media represented the area and its population, and disputed individual charges. They cited that crime was down in the NYPD's 47th Precinct with 60 percent fewer shootings. Advocates also argued that broad sweeps were more likely to incarcerate innocent people which can devastate communities of color.

After the sweep, violence remained low until 2019 when police officer Brian Mulkeen was shot and killed by friendly fire near Edenwald. After the shooting, mayor Bill de Blasio discussed plans for hiring social workers trained in gang mediation and installing security cameras in the development.

== Notable residents ==
- 88-Keys (born 1976), record producer and rapper
- DreamDoll (born 1992), rapper/reality television personality
- Jerry González (1949–2018), Latin jazz trumpeter
- Sharissa (born 1975), R&B singer
- Scoochie Smith (born 1994), professional basketball player
- Christopher Williams (born 1967), R&B singer and actor

== See also ==
- New York City Housing Authority
