= DreamDoll =

American rapper (born 1992)

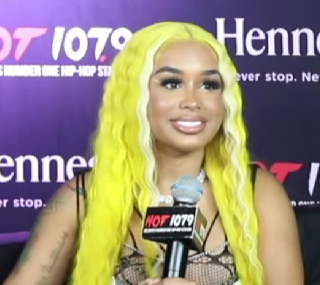
- DreamDoll in 2021

Background information
- Born: Tabatha Robinson; February 28, 1992 (age 34); The Bronx, New York, U.S.
- Genres: Hip-hop; drill; pop-rap
- Occupations: Rapper; actress
- Years active: 2015–present
- Labels: Warner; District 18; RCA; MNRK Music Group
- Website: theoriginaldreamdoll.com

Tabatha Robinson (born February 28, 1992), known professionally as DreamDoll, is an American rapper. She appeared on season 16 of Oxygen's Bad Girls Club: Social Disruption. In 2017, she joined the cast of VH1's Love & Hip Hop: New York. In 2022, she joined the BET+ series College Hill: Celebrity Edition. In 2024, she became a main cast member on VH1's The Impact: New York.

As a recording artist, she signed with Warner Records in 2021.

== Early life ==
Robinson was born on February 28, 1992 and raised in Edenwald Projects, in Edenwald, a small neighborhood within the Eastchester neighborhood in the Bronx, New York. Robinson attended Bronx Academy High School. Later on, she joined Westchester College and Herkimer Community College. She is the oldest of 5 siblings, with 2 sisters & 2 brothers.

In 2015, she began working as a bartender at popular New York strip club, Starlets. DreamDoll quickly became a favoured bartender at Starlets, widely known as one of their ‘Startenders’. This helped her gain a following on social media. She was primarily known for her pictures on Instagram. In September 2016, DreamDoll became a cast member on season 16 of the Reality TV Show, Bad Girls Club. In 2017, she was signed to DJ Self's record label, Gwinnin Entertainment.

== Career ==
On May 16, 2017, she released her debut single titled Everything Nice. On September 5, 2017, DreamDoll released the music video for Everything Nice. The video has since gained over 8 million views. On September 20, 2017, DreamDoll released her first mixtape titled Life In Plastic. The mixtape featured 14 tracks, 7 which were released exclusively on SoundCloud. In October, 2017 DreamDoll joined the cast of Love & Hip Hop: New York season 8. Before the end of the year she released 3 more videos for songs off her Life In Plastic Mixtape; Team Dream, We All Love Dream & Ice Cream. In 2017, DreamDoll became a brand ambassador for fashion brand Fashion Nova.

On June 22, 2018, DreamDoll released a new single titled 'Pull Up (WYA)'. The accompanying music video was released in August 2018. The same month she appeared as a team captain on MTV’s Wild 'n Out. In July, 2018 DreamDoll became an ambassador for fashion brand PrettyLittleThing.

On September 7, 2018, DreamDoll released her second mixtape titled Life In Plastic:2. The 10 song mixtape featured Lil' Kim, LouGotCash, Cupcakke & David Lee. On September 10, 2018, DreamDoll had her first headlining concert celebrating the release of her mixtape. The same day she released the music video for the second single from the mixtape 'Bundles'.

In January 2019, DreamDoll's name was brought up during a rap feud between Tory Lanez & Don Q. After hearing this, DreamDoll went on to release a diss track aimed at Tory Lanez titled 'On Ya Head'. The song was an instant hit and quickly garnered a lot of attention as DreamDoll had introduced her new flow some refer to as her 'nightmare flow'. The same day the track was released, her second mixtape Life In Plastic:2 reentered the iTunes Hip Hop & Rap charts and peaked at #2.

In March 2019, she was featured on Vado's song 'Talk To Me', including the music video. On May 22, 2019, she released the third and final music video from Life In Plastic: 2 for 'When It's Over'. A music video was shot for 'Real One', however the footage was lost. In August, 2019 DreamDoll appeared on two episodes of VH1's Hip Hop Squares.

=== RCA Records (2019–2021) ===
In early 2019, DreamDoll signed a joint record deal with RCA Records & Brooklyn Johnny's District 18 Entertainment. She was later featured on Hitmaka's 'Thot Box Remix' and music video alongside Young MA, Dreezy, Latto & Chinese Kitty. The song was an instant hit and DreamDoll's verse garnered the attention of many listeners. In November 2019, she released her 'Behind Bars' Freestyle, a remix of Drake's Behind Barz Freestyle.

On February 13, 2020, DreamDoll released her first single under RCA Records/District 18 Entertainment titled 'Who You Loving', featuring G-Eazy & Rahky and a music video. On April 13, 2020, she featured on Bandhunta Izzy's single 'Vibes'. In May she was featured on DJ Drewski's song 'Water' alongside Rubi Rose & Molly Brazy. Both songs had music videos. Early 2020, DreamDoll became a brand ambassador for Rihanna’s Savage X Fenty lingerie line.

On July 10, 2020 DreamDoll released a single, "Ah Ah Ah" featuring Fivio Foreign. The song was released with accompanying merch & a lyric video. 'Ah Ah Ah' reached the 23 position for two weeks on Billboard digital sales charts. On August 26, 2020 DreamDoll released the official music video for 'Ah Ah Ah'. On September 6, 2020 Rah Swish & DreamDoll released their single 'Watchu Like', the music video released on September 11, 2020. On November 13, 2020 G4 Boyz released 'Prada Remix' featuring DreamDoll & G4Choppa, with a music video. On December 17, 2020 DreamDoll & LightSkinKeisha were featured on Saucy Santana's 'It's a Vibe' and music video.

On January 31, 2021 DreamDoll released 'Different Freestyle' with a music video. The song was a hit and was deemed as her most successful solo release at the time. On April 9, 2021 DreamDoll appeared on CJ's 'Lil Freak' and music video. It was a hit record for both artists. In April 2021, DreamDoll released 2 more songs; her 'Whoopty Remix' and 'Collection Freestyle’. On April 24, she appeared on Shaybo's 'Broke Boyz' and music video. On May 28, 2020, she featured on Erica Banks 'Toot That Remix' and music video.

On June 11, 2021, DreamDoll released her single 'Tryouts'. In the song she name drops a long list of female celebrities which she would like to 'tryout'. A music video was later released.

On July 10, Asian Doll released 'Nunnadet Shit Remix' featuring DreamDoll, Rubi Rose, Dreezy & Ivorian Doll.

=== Warner Records (2021–present) ===
On August 11, 2021, DreamDoll signed a record deal with Warner Records. She also signed with WME Agency. On August 24, 2021, DreamDoll performed on the Main Stage at Hot 97 Summer Jam.

On November 24, 2021, DreamDoll released her debut single under Warner Records, titled 'You Know My Body' featuring Capella Grey. The song samples 'Can't Let Go' by Fabolous. She later released a music video for the song. On November 19, 2021, DreamDoll's song 'Chacin' was released on the soundtrack for Halle Berry's Netflix movie Bruised. The soundtrack was created by Halle Berry & Cardi B. On December 9, 2021, she featured on Rick Ross' song 'Wiggle' and accompanying music video. On December 17, 2021, DreamDoll released 'Oh Shhh'. The song was used as the theme song for the final season of Claws. The song's music video featured the cast members of Claws.

In February 2022, DreamDoll appeared on Kendy X's 'For Me Remix' alongside Kalan.FrFr. She also featured on Loui's 'Get In Get Out', both songs released with music videos. On March 8, 2022, DreamDoll made her second appearance on MTV's Wild 'n Out as a team captain. On April 22, 2022, DreamDoll released a single titled 'Ice Cream Dream' featuring French Montana, with a music video. On May 6, 2022, DreamDoll began touring with Fivio Foreign. The tour consisted of 19 shows and ended on June 6, 2022. On May 13, 2022, DreamDoll was featured on King Combs's 'Gas You Up'. On June 27, 2022, DreamDoll joined the cast of the BET+ series College Hill: Celebrity Edition Season 1.

On September 22, 2022, DreamDoll released the third and final instalment of her Life In Plastic series, 'Life In Plastic:3'. The 8 track EP featured 5 new songs and 3 pre released singles. The same day, she released the official music video for 'Misunderstood'. The EP included her single 'Fantasy' featuring Kash Doll. A music video was set to be shot, but they never began filming for unknown reasons. It was rumored that Bia was to feature on 'Fantasy'. On September 27, 2022, she performed at Rolling Loud, New York. In October, 2022 BET+ released a new reality TV series 'The Impact: Atlanta', in which DreamDoll made a few guest appearances.

On February 24, 2023 Russ Millions released "Habibti" featuring DreamDoll & French Montana. On April 20, 2023, DreamDoll played the role of Meena in the MTV stoner movie Pretty Stoned. On July 6, 2023, DreamDoll released her 'Red Bull 60 Seconds' freestyle via Instagram. The same month DreamDoll released two more songs with accompanying music videos, titled "I'll Be Good (Freestyle)" and "Project Dick". On August 3, 2023, DreamDoll released the music video for "Frank Stand" from her EP Life In Plastic:3. In December 2023, DreamDoll was featured on the cover of Viper Magazine's 10th anniversary issue.

In January 2024, DreamDoll was a main cast member on VH1 & BET+'s reality TV series The Impact: New York, which premiered on VH1 . On March 8, 2024, DreamDoll released her single Jelly. The remix to Jelly featuring 2Rare was dropped on May 10, alongside the music video.

In July 2026, DreamDoll participated as a student in the second installment of Kai Cenat's Streamer University creator bootcamp, marking an expansion of her digital presence into the live-streaming space. During the multi-day broadcast, she became the subject of widespread online attention following a highly publicized on-stream dispute involving fellow student Queen Naija. The confrontation occurred after Queen Naija's partner, Clarence White, was seen visiting the dorm room that DreamDoll shared with content creator Jordyn Lucas.

== Personal life ==
On January 2, 2025, DreamDoll announced that she is pregnant with her first child. In March 2025, DreamDoll gave birth to a daughter.

== Discography ==
=== Mixtapes ===
List of mixtapes, with selected details
Title	Details
Life in Plastic	Released: 2017; Format: Digital download, streaming
Life in Plastic: 2	Released: 2018; Format: Digital download, streaming
Life in Plastic: 3	Released: 2022; Format: Digital download, streaming

=== Singles ===
==== As main artist ====
List of singles as a main artist, with year released and album name
Title	Year	Album
"Everything Nice"	2017	Non-album single
"Pull Up (WYA)"	2018	Non-album single
"Bundles"	2018	Non-album single
"Who You Loving" (featuring G-Eazy and Rahky)	2020	Non-album single
"Ah Ah Ah" (featuring Fivio Foreign)	2020	Non-album single
"Tryouts"	2021	Non-album single
"You Know My Body" (featuring Capella Grey)	2021	Non-album single
"Oh Shhh"	2021	Non-album single
"Ice Cream Dream" (featuring French Montana)	2022	Non-album single
"Misunderstood"	2022	Non-album single
"Fantasy" (featuring Kash Doll)	2022	Non-album single
"Jelly"	2024	Non-album single
"Jelly" (Remix) (featuring 2Rare)	2024	Non-album single
"Log Off"	2024	Non-album single

==== As featured artist ====
List of singles as a featured artist, with year released and album name
Title	Year	Album
"How to Talk" (Lil Uzi Vert featuring DreamDoll)	2017	Non-album singles
"Party" (Young Dolla featuring DreamDoll and Golde)	2017	Non-album singles
"100k" (Phresher featuring DreamDoll and Jay Critch)	2018	Non-album singles
"Throw It in the Air (Oh Shit)" (Panic Boyz featuring DreamDoll, Brittney Taylor and Just Brittany)	2018	Non-album singles
"Swagg" (RockstarBreez featuring DreamDoll)	2018	Non-album singles
"Flex" (Macho Duzz featuring DreamDoll)	2018	Non-album singles
"Summer" (Trace Cyrus featuring DreamDoll)	2018	Non-album singles
"Love Her Again" (LouGotCash featuring DreamDoll)	2018	Non-album singles
"Splash" (SiAngie Twins featuring DreamDoll)	2018	Non-album singles
"What You Want" (Winter Blanco featuring DreamDoll)	2018	Non-album singles
"Talk to Me" (Vado featuring DreamDoll)	2019	Non-album singles
"Doll House" (J.Diamondz featuring DreamDoll)	2019	Non-album singles
"Spend It" (M-Flair featuring DreamDoll)	2019	Non-album singles
"Thot Box" (Remix) (Hitmaka featuring DreamDoll, Young MA, Dreezy, Latto and Chinese Kitty)	2019	Non-album singles
"Poppin" (Fredo Bang featuring DreamDoll)	2019	Non-album singles
"Vibes" (Bandhunta Izzy featuring DreamDoll)	2020	Non-album singles
"Water" (DJ Drewski featuring DreamDoll, Rubi Rose and Molly Brazy)	2020	Non-album singles
"Outside Wit It" (ItsBizKit featuring DreamDoll and Jadakiss)	2020	Non-album singles
"Thug Love" (Aaria featuring DreamDoll)	2020	Non-album singles
"Watchu Like" (Rah Swish and DreamDoll)	2020	Non-album singles
"Prada" (Remix) (G4 Boyz featuring DreamDoll and G4Choppa)	2020	Non-album singles
"Chicken N Grits" (Yung Pooda featuring DreamDoll)	2020	Non-album singles
"It's a Vibe" (Saucy Santana featuring DreamDoll and LightSkinKeisha)	2020	Non-album singles
"Goin Up" (N.O.R.E featuring DreamDoll and DJ Khaled)	2021	Non-album singles
"Lil Freak" (CJ featuring DreamDoll)	2021	Non-album singles
"Broke Boyz" (Shaybo featuring DreamDoll)	2021	Non-album singles
"Toot That" (Remix) (Erica Banks featuring DreamDoll and BeatKing)	2021	Non-album singles
"Summertime Valentine" (Amiyelle featuring DreamDoll)	2021	Non-album singles
"Baddie" (Dread Zoe featuring DreamDoll)	2021	Non-album singles
"Nunnadet Shit" (Remix) (Asian Doll featuring DreamDoll, Rubi Rose, Dreezy and Ivorian Doll)	2021	Non-album singles
"Wiggle" (Rick Ross featuring DreamDoll)	2021	Non-album singles
"For Me" (Remix) (Kendy X featuring DreamDoll and Kalan.frfr)	2022	Non-album singles
"Get In Get Out" (Loui featuring DreamDoll)	2022	Non-album singles
"Gas You Up" (King Combs featuring DreamDoll)	2022	Non-album singles
"Abow" (Kash Doll, Rubi Rose and DreamDoll featuring ShantiiP)	2022	Non-album singles
"Shake Sum" (Don Q featuring DreamDoll)	2022	Non-album singles
"Habibti" (Russ Millions featuring DreamDoll and French Montana)	2023	Non-album singles
"Pop It" (Tuson featuring DreamDoll)	2023	Non-album singles
"Big Mood" (Freestyle) (Trina featuring DreamDoll and Supa Cindy)	2023	Non-album singles
"Store Run" (Capella Grey featuring DreamDoll and Really Jaewon)	2023	Non-album singles
"We Can't Forget Him" (Remix) (Bobbi Storm, Fridayy and DreamDoll)	2024	Non-album singles
"Lay It Down" (TRY featuring DreamDoll and Jay1)	2024	Non-album singles
"Shake Shake" (Rayvanny featuring DreamDoll)	2024	Non-album singles

== Filmography ==
Year	Title	Role	Notes
2016	Bad Girls Club 16: Social Disruption	Herself	4 episodes
2016–2017	Wild 'n Out	Wild N’ Out Girl	Recurring
2017–2018	Love & Hip Hop: New York 8	Herself	14 episodes
2018	Wild 'n Out	Team Captain	1 episode
2019	Hip Hop Squares	Herself	2 episodes
2021	BET: Cooked In 5	Herself	1 episode
2022	Pizza Wars	Herself	Guest
2022	Wild 'n Out	Team Captain	1 episode
2022	College Hill: Celebrity Edition	Herself	8 episodes
2022–2023	The Impact: Atlanta	Herself	5 episodes
2022	Lola 2	Angry customer	Film
2023	Blended Christmas	Nicole	Film
2023	Pretty Stoned	Meena	Film
2024	The Impact: New York	Herself	Main
2024	Bid for Love 2	Princess	Film
2024	Black Heat	Alexis	Film
2024	Baddies	Herself	Judge (season 6)
