= The Impact: New York =

2024 reality television series

- Genre: Reality
- Starring: Ashley Marie Burgos; Bernice Burgos; Chinese Kitty; Cleotrapa; DreamDoll; Ella Rodriguez; Maleni Cruz; Scot Louie
- Country of origin: United States
- Original language: English
- No. of seasons: 1
- No. of episodes: 8

Production
- Executive producers: Pierre "P" Thomas; Kevin "Coach K" Lee; Brian Sher; Karam Gill; Tara Long; Gennifer Gardner; Tom Danon; Tiffany Lea Williams; Angela Aguilera; James Knox; Ia Robinson; Anthony Sylvester; Kim Osorio; Cecily Deutsch
- Production location: New York City
- Running time: 41 minutes
- Production companies: Entertainment One; Quality Films

Original release
- Network: VH1
- Release: January 22 – March 11, 2024

Related
- The Impact: Atlanta

The Impact: New York is an American reality television series that premiered on VH1 January 22, 2024. It is a spin-off of the BET+ series The Impact: Atlanta. The series chronicles the lives of eight New York City influencers in business, music, beauty, and fashion.

== Cast ==
- Ashley Marie Burgos
- Bernice Burgos
- Chinese Kitty
- Cleotrapa
- DreamDoll
- Ella Rodriguez
- Maleni Cruz
- Scot Louie

== Episodes ==
No.	Title	Original release date
1	"A New York State of Mind"	January 22, 2024
2	"Photoshoot Showdown"	January 29, 2024
3	"Knock, Knock!"	February 5, 2024
4	"Beef Is Not on the Menu"	February 12, 2024
5	"Destination Drama"	February 19, 2024
6	"Things Are Getting... Weird!"	February 26, 2024
7	"Breaking Free"	March 4, 2024
8	"Standing on Business!"	March 11, 2024
