= The Impact: Atlanta =

2022 reality television series

- Genre: Reality
- Starring: Ariana "Ari" Fletcher; Dionte "Arrogant Tae" Gray; Lakeyah; Destiny "Dess Dior" Bailey; Jayda Cheaves; Tuson Jewell; Jerrika Karlae; Moneybagg Yo; LightSkinKeisha; Gloss Up; Tori Brixx; Coco Vango; Dayira "DayyBella" Jones; Sir Julien; Derrian "Phreshy" Perry
- Country of origin: United States
- Original language: English
- No. of seasons: 3
- No. of episodes: 26

Production
- Executive producers: Pierre "P" Thomas; Kevin "Coach K" Lee; Brian Sher; Karam Gill; Tara Long; Gennifer Gardner; Slane Hatch; Ariana "Ari" Fletcher
- Producers: Jerrika Karlae; Tuson Jewell
- Production location: Atlanta, Georgia
- Production companies: Entertainment One; Quality Films

Original release
- Network: BET+
- Release: October 5, 2022 – November 28, 2024

Related
- The Impact: New York

The Impact: Atlanta is an American reality television series that premiered on BET+ on October 5, 2022.

== Production ==
On September 12, 2023, the series was renewed for a second season which premiered on October 5, 2023.

On September 30, 2024, the series was renewed for a third season which premiered on October 17, 2024.

== Cast ==
- Ariana "Ari" Fletcher
- Dionte "Arrogant Tae" Gray (seasons 1–2)
- Lakeyah (seasons 1–2)
- Destiny "Dess Dior" Bailey (seasons 1–2)
- Jayda Cheaves (season 1)
- Tuson Jewell (season 2–present)
- Jerrika Karlae (season 2–present)
- Moneybagg Yo (season 2; guest, season 1)
- LightSkinKeisha (season 3)
- Gloss Up (season 3)
- Tori Brixx (season 3)
- Coco Vango (season 3)
- Dayira "DayyBella" Jones (season 3)
- Sir Julien (season 3)
- Derrian "Phreshy" Perry (season 3)

== Episodes ==
=== Series overview ===
Season	Episodes	Originally released	
Season	Episodes	First released	Last released
1	9	October 5, 2022	January 26, 2023
2	9	October 5, 2023	November 23, 2023
3	8	October 17, 2024	November 28, 2024

=== Season 1 (2022–23) ===
No. overall	No. in season	Title	Original release date	BET/VH1 air date	U.S. linear viewers (millions)
1	1	"Atlanta Royalty"	October 5, 2022	October 4, 2022 (BET); January 2, 2023 (VH1)	0.26 (BET); 0.23 (VH1)
2	2	"Petty or Not, Here I Come"	October 5, 2022	January 9, 2023 (VH1)	N/A
3	3	"Life's Too Short"	October 12, 2022	January 16, 2023 (VH1)	0.16 (VH1)
4	4	"Manifesting Millions"	October 19, 2022	January 23, 2023 (VH1)	0.22 (VH1)
5	5	"Mind Yo Business"	October 26, 2022	January 30, 2023 (VH1)	0.17 (VH1)
6	6	"Family Ties"	November 2, 2022	February 6, 2023 (VH1)	0.17 (VH1)
7	7	"Time to Face the Music"	November 9, 2022	February 13, 2023 (VH1)	0.26 (VH1)
8	8	"Products, Performances and Pettiness"	November 16, 2022	February 20, 2023 (VH1)	0.17 (VH1)
9	9	"Reunion"	January 26, 2023	TBA	N/A

=== Season 2 (2023) ===
No. overall	No. in season	Title	Original release date	BET/VH1 air date	U.S. linear viewers (millions)
10	1	"Big Moves, Bigger Dreams, Biggest Impact"	October 5, 2023	October 10, 2023 (BET); April 22, 2024 (VH1)	N/A
11	2	"Bad Dad"	October 5, 2023	April 29, 2024 (VH1)	N/A
12	3	"Fake Friends"	October 12, 2023	May 6, 2024 (VH1)	N/A
13	4	"It's Giving Delusional, Babe!"	October 19, 2023	May 13, 2024 (VH1)	N/A
14	5	"Everybody Nose You Fake"	October 26, 2023	May 20, 2024 (VH1)	N/A
15	6	"No Excuses"	November 2, 2023	May 27, 2024 (VH1)	N/A
16	7	"Broken Bonds, Empty Promises"	November 9, 2023	June 3, 2024 (VH1)	N/A
17	8	"Transitions, Triumphs, & Turmoil"	November 16, 2023	June 10, 2024 (VH1)	N/A
18	9	"After The Impact Atlanta"	November 23, 2023	June 17, 2024 (VH1)	N/A

=== Season 3 (2024) ===
No. overall	No. in season	Title	Original release date	BET/VH1 air date	U.S. linear viewers (millions)
19	1	"It Goes Down in A"	October 17, 2024	October 15, 2024 (BET)	N/A
20	2	"Rumor Has It"	October 17, 2024	July 29, 2025 (BET)	N/A
21	3	"Not Here For Your Games"	October 24, 2024	August 5, 2025 (BET)	N/A
22	4	"Tuson is Too Much"	October 31, 2024	August 12, 2025 (BET)	N/A
23	5	"DJ Spins, Drama Begins"	November 7, 2024	August 19, 2025 (BET)	N/A
24	6	"It's Giving Messy Vibes"	November 14, 2024	August 26, 2025 (BET)	N/A
25	7	"Go Fund Me"	November 21, 2024	September 2, 2025 (BET)	N/A
26	8	"Hating Outside The Club"	November 28, 2024	September 9, 2025 (BET)	N/A

== Spin-off ==
On December 20, 2023, VH1 ordered a spin-off titled The Impact: New York which premiered on January 22, 2024.
