= East 233rd Street (Bronx) =

Street in the Bronx, New York

- Interactive map of East 233rd Street
- Owner: City of New York
- Maintained by: NYCDOT
- Length: 3.1 mi (5.0 km)
- Location: Bronx, New York City
- Coordinates: 40°53′32.18″N 73°51′13.77″W
- West end: I-87 in Van Cortlandt Park
- Major junctions: Bronx River Parkway / Webster Avenue at the Woodlawn–Wakefield line NY 22 in Eastchester
- East end: US 1 in Eastchester

East 233rd Street is a major thoroughfare in the New York City borough of The Bronx. The road is 3 miles (4.8 km) long and stretches from U.S. Route 1 (Boston Road) in the Eastchester section of the Bronx to the Major Deegan Expressway (I-87) in Woodlawn (near Van Cortlandt Park). The road changes names from East 233rd Street to Pinkley Avenue after the eastern terminus, at Boston Road. There is one interchange with a highway along the way, which is for the Bronx River Parkway. There are two subway stations along the road, one at Dyre Avenue, serving the 5 train, and one at White Plains Road, serving the 2 and 5 trains.

== Street description ==
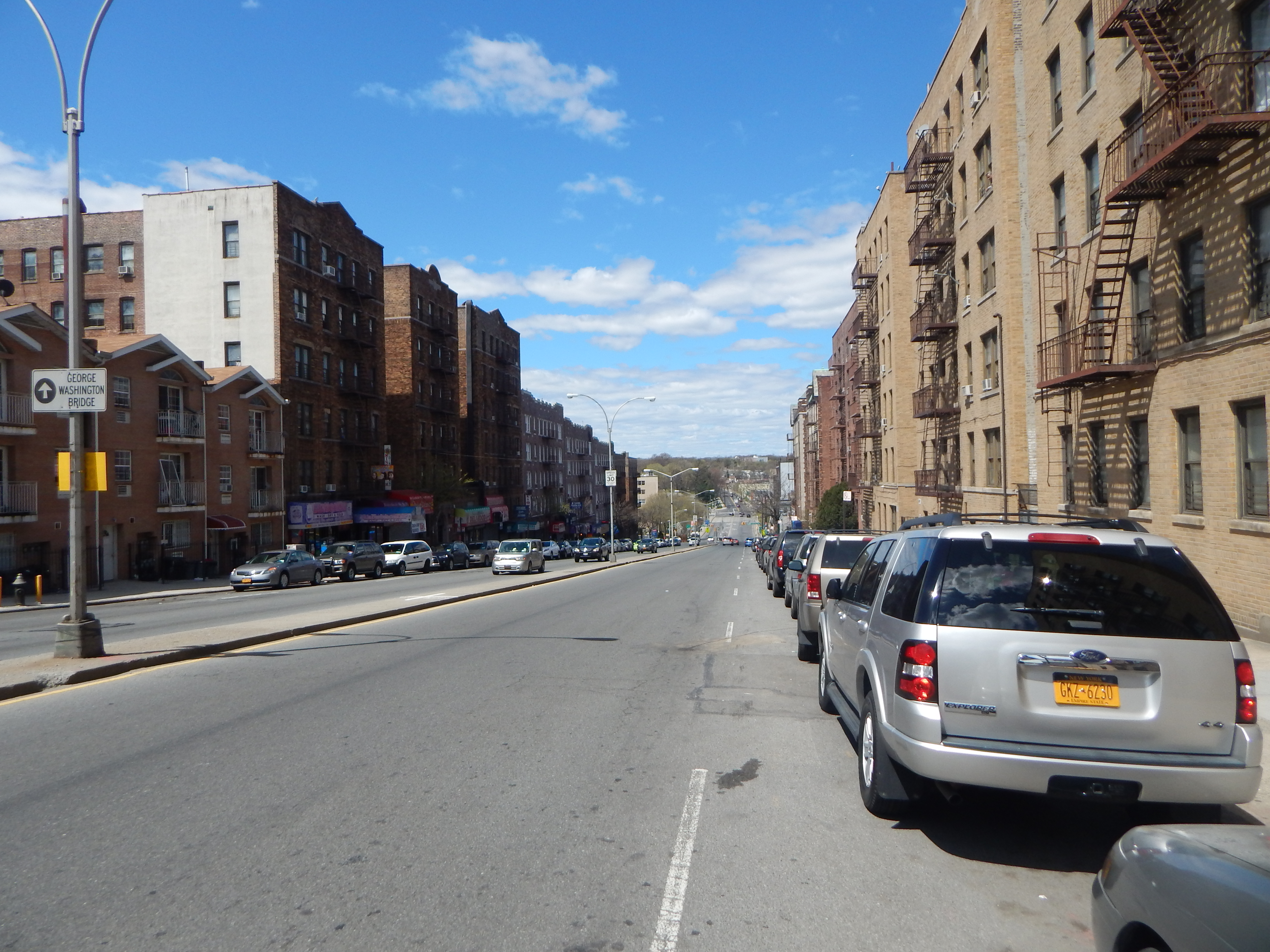
East 233rd Street heading westward through Woodlawn

East 233rd Street begins at an interchange with Jerome Avenue and Interstate 87, the Major Deegan Expressway, in Van Cortlandt Park. The road serves as the northern border of Woodlawn Cemetery until its intersection with Webster Avenue, where it meets Metro-North's Harlem Line at the Woodlawn station. Webster Avenue also serves as the access point to and from the southbound side of the Bronx River Parkway, though the Parkway signs this exit for "East 233rd Street." Access for the northbound side of the Parkway is provided by Bronx Boulevard. One block east at Carpenter Avenue, the road passes by Our Lady of Mercy Medical Center on the south side.

At an interchange with White Plains Road, the road passes by the subway station that serves the 2 and 5 trains. Now in the neighborhood of Edenwald, the road intersects Baychester Avenue (the former routing of Route 164) at the northwest corner of Seton Falls Park. In the neighborhood of Eastchester, the road passes by the second subway station, which serves the 5 train. A few blocks to the east, the road intersects Provost Avenue, which carries Route 22. The road then narrows down from four lanes to two lanes, and terminates at a partial interchange with Boston Road, which carries U.S. 1. However, access is only provided to U.S. 1 south via service roads. From here, the road continues south for two additional blocks known as Pinkley Avenue.

== History ==
Originally, between its western end and Webster Avenue, East 233rd Street was known as Eastchester Street. It was known as 19th Avenue within Wakefield, where it served as the southern border of Jacksonville. In Eastchester, the street was called Fisher's Landing Road, running to the Hutchinson River to the site of land owned by William Fisher.

Between Webster and Provost Avenues, East 233rd Street was once part of NY 22, which previously continued into Manhattan. The road was also part of the alignment for the proposed City Line Expressway.

== Transportation ==
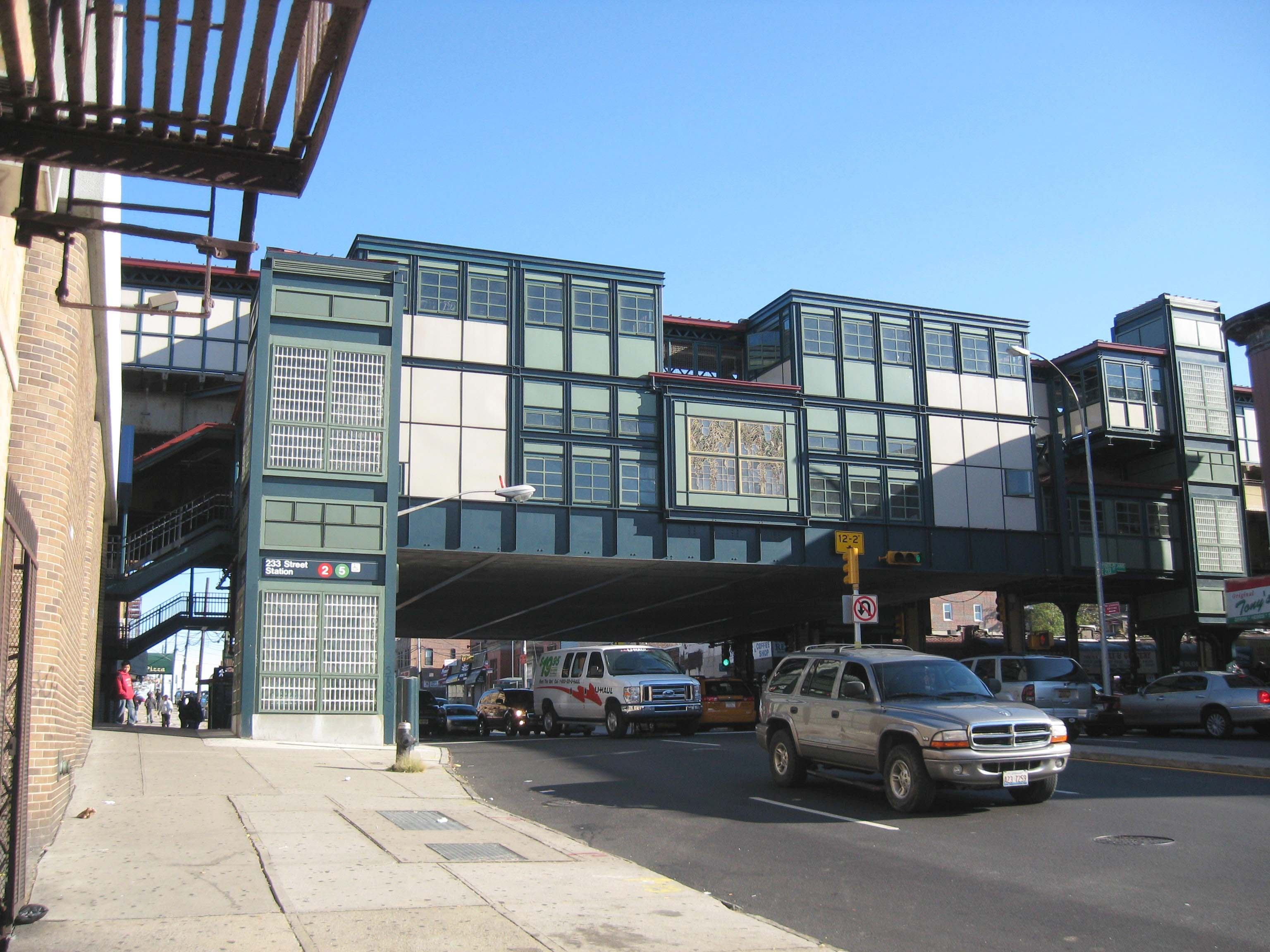
The 233rd Street station on the IRT White Plains Road Line

There are two New York City Subway stations along East 233rd Street:

- The first one, 233rd Street, is located at the intersection of 233rd and White Plains Road. It serves the 2 and 5 trains and has a connection to the Metro-North line at the nearby Webster Avenue intersection.
- The second one, Eastchester–Dyre Avenue, is located at the Dyre Avenue intersection with Eastchester. The station serves the 5 train and is the end of the IRT Dyre Avenue Line.

There is access to the following buses provided by the Metropolitan Transportation Authority on East 233rd Street:

- The Bx16 runs on two portions, between Jerome and Webster Avenues and between Baychester and Dyre Avenues.
- From Katonah Avenue, the Bx34 and BxM4 head west to Jerome Avenue, and the Bx31 heads east to Laconia Avenue.
- Additional service is provided by Westchester County’s Bee Line route 55 in the Yonkers direction from Dyre to Provost Avenues.

== Major intersections ==
The entire route is in the New York City borough of the Bronx.

Location	mi	km	Destinations	Notes
Van Cortlandt Park	0.0	0.0	I-87 (Major Deegan Expressway) / Jerome Avenue – Manhattan, Queens, Albany	Western terminus; exit 13 on I-87
Woodlawn–Wakefield line	0.8– 0.9	1.3– 1.4	Bronx River Parkway / Webster Avenue	Exit 10 on Bronx River Parkway
Eastchester	2.8	4.5	NY 22 (Provost Avenue)	
Eastchester	3.0	4.8	US 1 south (Boston Road)	Eastern terminus
1.000 mi = 1.609 km; 1.000 km = 0.621 mi
