= Gloss Up =

American rapper (born 1997)

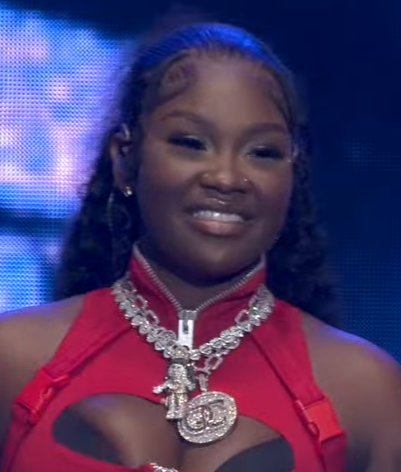
- Gloss Up in 2023

Background information
- Born: Jerrica LaShay Russell; July 16, 1997 (age 29); Memphis, Tennessee, U.S
- Genres: Hip hop; trap; crunk; Southern hip hop
- Occupations: Rapper; singer; songwriter
- Years active: 2017–present
- Label: Quality Control
- Website: glossupofficial.com

Jerrica LaShay Russell (born July 16, 1997), known professionally as Gloss Up, is an American rapper and singer from Memphis, Tennessee.

== Early life ==
Jerrica Russell was born on July 16, 1997 in Memphis, Tennessee. Her parents, a DJ father and singer mother, exposed her to music from a young age. She has three siblings. Russell began writing her own songs and raps at the age of seven. She attended Melrose High School, where she was involved in cheerleading and drama.

== Career ==
Gloss Up began her music career in her teenage years, performing at local talent shows and open mic events in Memphis. She began to release several mixtapes and singles, gaining a local following.

Gloss Up released her debut single "Run Me Up", which gained widespread attention and critical acclaim from music critics. On May 24, 2019, Gloss released her debut extended play, Different Shades of Gloss. In 2022, Gloss Up signed a recording contract with Quality Control Music.

On September 30, 2022, Gloss Up was featured on Hitkidd's single "Shabooya", alongside Slimeroni, Aleza, and K Carbon. On January 18, 2023, Gloss released "Bestfrenn", featuring GloRilla, accompanied by a music video.

On January 20, 2023, Gloss Up released her debut mixtape, Before the Gloss Up. The mixtape features collaborations with GloRilla, Icewear Vezzo, and others. On March 17, 2023, a remix of "Shabooya" was released, featuring Lola Brooke.

On March 23, 2023, Gloss Up was featured on Flo Milli's song "Bed Time" alongside Monaleo. In 2023, Gloss Up released several singles including "La La", "Check", "Rich Baby Mama", and "Don't Like" featuring Bigg Bagg Queezy.

On August 11, 2023, Gloss Up released the project Shades of Gloss, featuring guest appearances by Sexyy Red and Saucy Santana.

In December 2023, Gloss Up released "N.A.L.B" featuring Chrisean Rock. In 2024, Gloss Up released the single "Ride Home" featuring Jacquees, accompanied by a music video.

On May 3, 2024, Gloss Up released the album Not Ya Girl: Act 1.

In mid-December of 2024, Russell joined a new reality series titled Baddies Gone Wild. The series premiered on May 11, 2025.

== Personal life ==
Russell has two sons with her two fellow rapper.

== Discography ==
=== Albums ===
List of mixtapes, with selected details
| Title | Album details |
|---|---|
| Before the Gloss Up | Released: January 20, 2023; Label: Quality Control Music; Formats: Digital download, streaming |
| Not Ya Girl: Act 1 | Released: May 3, 2024; Label: Quality Control; Formats: Digital download, streaming |
