= Eastchester, Bronx =

Neighborhood in New York City

Eastchester
- Neighborhood of the Bronx
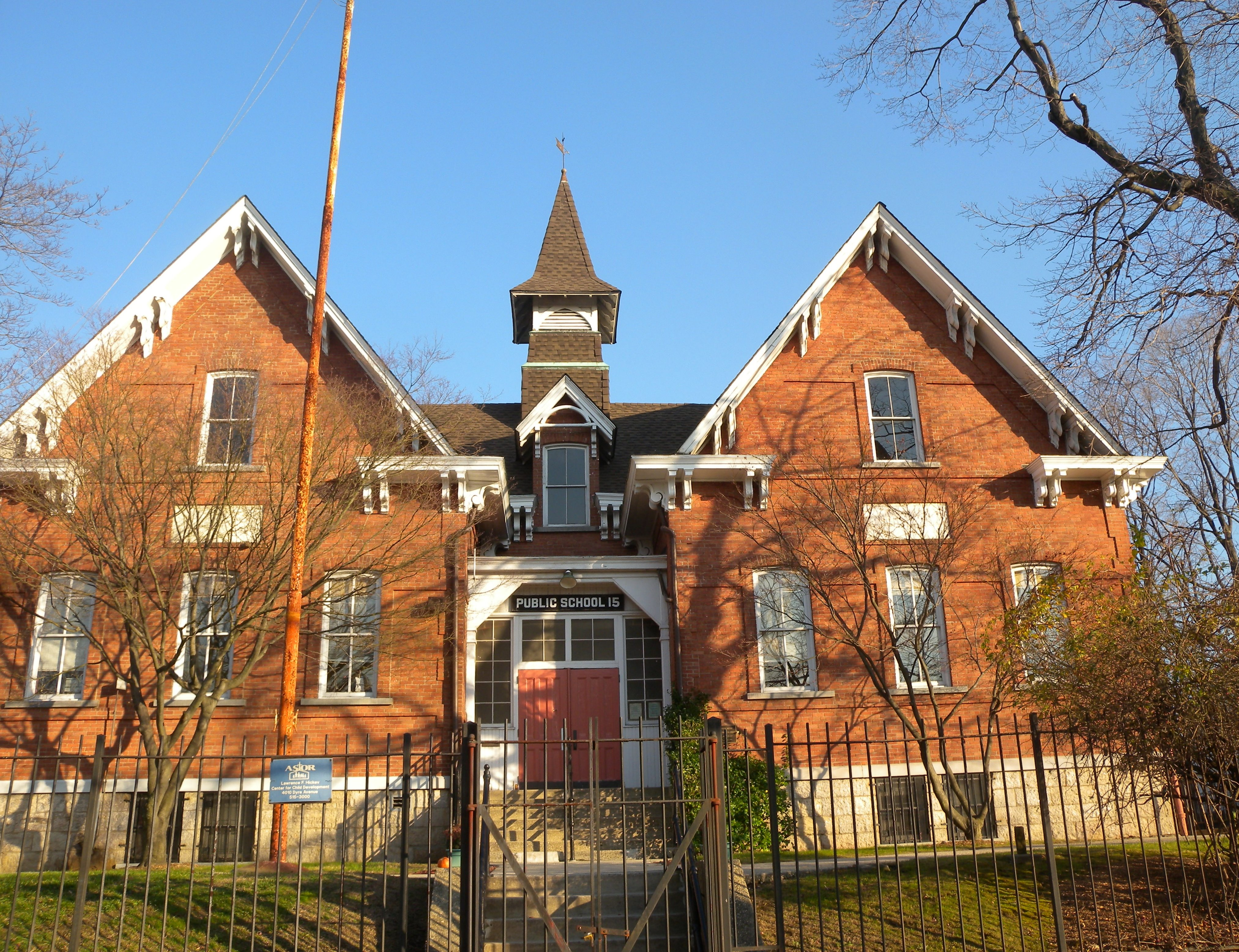
- The historic PS 15 on Dyre Avenue
- Interactive map of Eastchester
- Coordinates: 40.882°N 73.83°W
- Country: United States
- State: New York
- City: New York City
- Borough: The Bronx
- Community District: The Bronx 12

Economics

Ethnicity
- Time zone: UTC−05:00 (Eastern (EST))
  - Summer (DST): UTC−04:00 (Eastern (EDT))
- ZIP Codes: 10466 and 10475
- Area code: 718, 347, 929, and 917
- Website: www.eastchester.nyc www.edenwald.nyc

Eastchester is a working-class neighborhood in the northeast Bronx in New York City. Its boundaries, starting from the north and moving clockwise are the Bronx-Westchester County border to the north, the New England Thruway to the east, Baychester Avenue to the south, and the intersection of 233rd Street and Baychester Avenue to the west. Boston Road is the primary thoroughfare through Eastchester and Dyre Avenue is the main commercial street. Eastchester includes the sub-neighborhood of Edenwald.

Eastchester is part of Bronx Community Board 12, and its ZIP Codes include 10466 and 10475. The area is patrolled by the 47th Precinct of the New York City Police Department.

== History ==
The neighborhood was historically heavily Ashkenazi-Jewish and Italian-American, It has the same name as a modern-day town located approximately 5 miles (8.0 km) to the north, as the neighborhood was included in the Town of Eastchester until the late 19th century upon annexation by the City of New York, its boundaries roughly matching the former Village of Eastchester, which was incorporated on March 25, 1895. The modern-day city of Mount Vernon, located right across the city line and bordering the Eastchester neighborhood, was also once part of the town. While Mount Vernon has developed along similar lines as the neighborhood of Eastchester, the modern-day Town of Eastchester (i.e. north of Mount Vernon) is markedly more affluent.

233rd Street and Boston Road are the major thoroughfares in Eastchester. Intersecting both of these streets, Dyre Avenue is the neighborhood's main commercial strip. There is also a shopping center, Shopwell Plaza (named for the former Shopwell supermarket chain) located on Boston Road next to the Boston-Secor housing project. In 2007 the city's parks department rehabilitated Seton Falls Park.

Since the mid-20th century, the neighborhood's name began to decline in currency, meaning that in recent years residents have not really been cognizant about living in a neighborhood called "Eastchester". This is perhaps due to confusion with Eastchester Road, a thoroughfare which runs through other parts of the Bronx, or with the Town of Eastchester in Westchester County. It is more common to hear the Eastchester neighborhood described as "east of White Plains Road", "south of Mount Vernon", "near Pelham", "East 233rd Street", etc.

== Land use and terrain ==
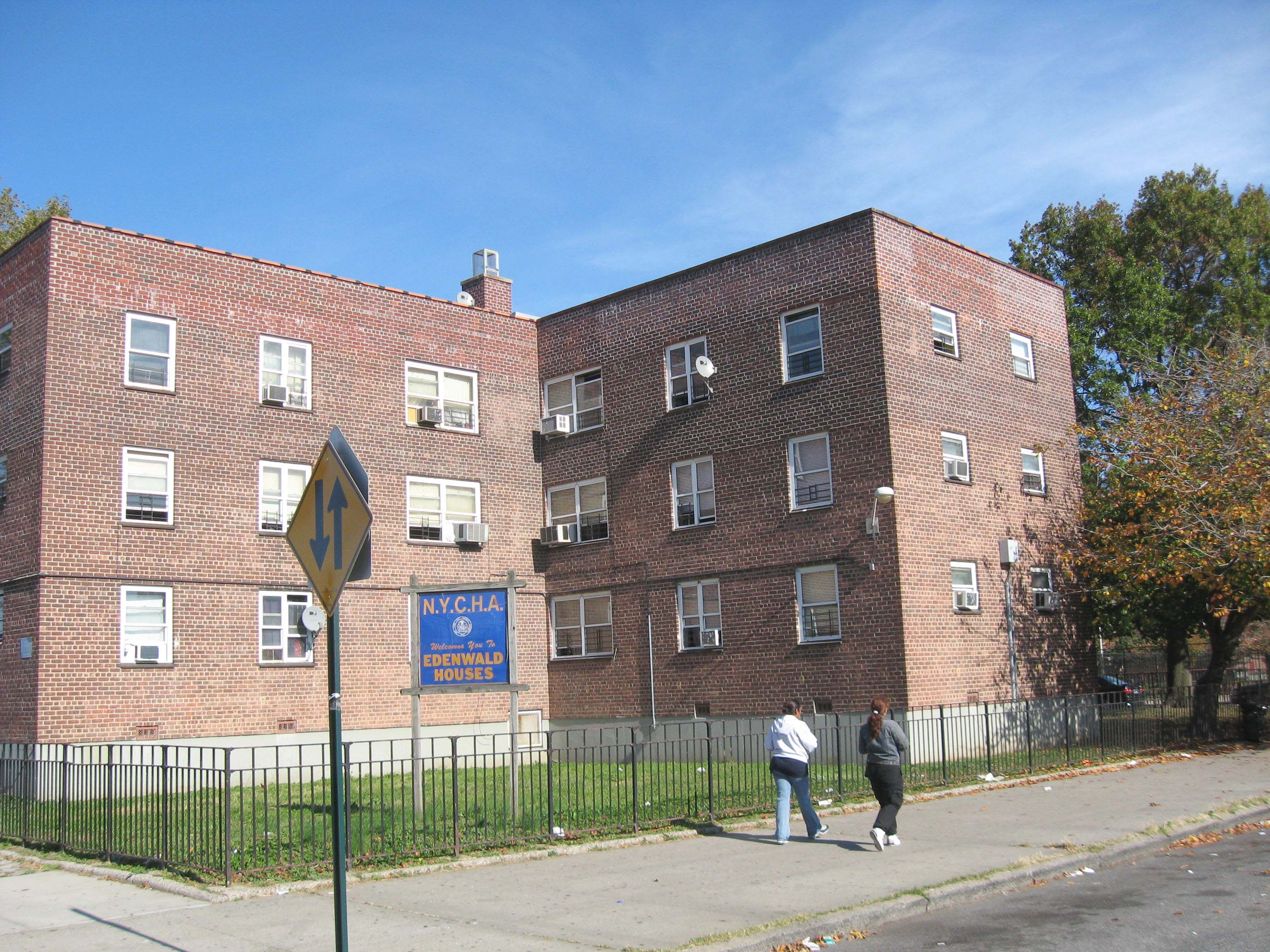
NYCHA Edenwald Houses

Eastchester is dominated by one- and two-family homes of various types, one large public housing project, and an industrial district. The total land area is roughly half a square mile. The area is low-lying and flat. The Hutchinson River runs through Eastchester, partly along the line of East 233rd Street. Bridges in Eastchester carry the New England Thruway and Boston Road over the river. A far northeastern portion of Eastchester, on the left bank of the Hutchinson River, is often confused with Pelham Manor, New York, since a nearby shopping center is located in that town.

The Boston Secor Houses, comprising four buildings that are 13, 14, 17 and 18 stories tall, is located in Eastchester.

Edenwald Houses is the largest New York City Housing Authority development in the Bronx, with forty buildings, 3 or 14 stories tall, on 48.88 acres (197,800 m^{2}). It has 2,036 apartments housing about 5,300 people. Completed on October 15, 1953, it is bordered by Grenada Place, East 225th Street, Baychester and Laconia Avenues. The Edenwald Projects is divided into two parts to the north and south, split by 229th Street. Bordering the south side is the Edenwald Community Center, which provides afterschool care and programs for the youth. During the summer, the center hosts a summer program for kids and jobs for pre-teens.

== Demographics ==
Eastchester has a population over 5,000. The neighborhood is a mix of African Americans, West Indians, Asians, Hispanics and Whites. 47.8% of the population lives below the poverty line.

The entirety of Community District 12, which comprises Eastchester and Williamsbridge, had 156,542 inhabitants as of NYC Health's 2018 Community Health Profile, with an average life expectancy of 81.0 years. This is about the same as the median life expectancy of 81.2 for all New York City neighborhoods. Most inhabitants are youth and middle-aged adults: 24% are between the ages of between 0–17, 27% between 25–44, and 26% between 45–64. The ratio of college-aged and elderly residents was lower, at 10% and 13% respectively.

As of 2017, the median household income in Community District 12 was $48,018. In 2018, an estimated 22% of Eastchester and Williamsbridge residents lived in poverty, compared to 25% in all of the Bronx and 20% in all of New York City. One in eight residents (13%) were unemployed, compared to 13% in the Bronx and 9% in New York City. Rent burden, or the percentage of residents who have difficulty paying their rent, is 57% in Eastchester and Williamsbridge, compared to the boroughwide and citywide rates of 58% and 51% respectively. Based on this calculation, as of 2018, Eastchester and Williamsbridge are considered high-income relative to the rest of the city and not gentrifying.

== Police and crime ==
Eastchester and Williamsbridge are patrolled by the 47th Precinct of the NYPD, located at 4111 Laconia Avenue. The 47th Precinct ranked 35th safest out of 69 patrol areas for per-capita crime in 2010. As of 2018, with a non-fatal assault rate of 82 per 100,000 people, Eastchester and Williamsbridge's rate of violent crimes per capita is more than that of the city as a whole. The incarceration rate of 577 per 100,000 people is higher than that of the city as a whole.

The 47th Precinct has a lower crime rate than in the 1990s, with crimes across all categories having decreased by 60.9% between 1990 and 2022. The precinct reported 16 murders, 45 rapes, 461 robberies, 732 felony assaults, 300 burglaries, 758 grand larcenies, and 461 grand larcenies auto in 2022.

== Fire safety ==
Eastchester is served by the New York City Fire Department (FDNY)'s Engine Co. 38/Ladder Co. 51 fire station at 3446 Eastchester Road.

== Health ==
As of 2018, preterm births and births to teenage mothers are more common in Eastchester and Williamsbridge than in other places citywide. In Eastchester and Williamsbridge, there were 102 preterm births per 1,000 live births (compared to 87 per 1,000 citywide), and 24 births to teenage mothers per 1,000 live births (compared to 19.3 per 1,000 citywide). Eastchester and Williamsbridge has a low population of residents who are uninsured. In 2018, this population of uninsured residents was estimated to be 8%, lower than the citywide rate of 12%.

The concentration of fine particulate matter, the deadliest type of air pollutant, in Eastchester and Williamsbridge is 0.0075 milligrams per cubic metre (7.5×10^{−9} oz/ft^{3}), the same as the city average. Eleven percent of Eastchester and Williamsbridge residents are smokers, which is lower than the city average of 14% of residents being smokers. In Eastchester and Williamsbridge, 30% of residents are obese, 14% are diabetic, and 39% have high blood pressure—compared to the citywide averages of 24%, 11%, and 28% respectively. In addition, 24% of children are obese, compared to the citywide average of 20%.

Eighty-eight percent of residents eat some fruits and vegetables every day, which is about the same as the city's average of 87%. In 2018, 78% of residents described their health as "good", "very good", or "excellent", equal to the city's average of 78%. For every supermarket in Eastchester and Williamsbridge, there are 8 bodegas.

The nearest large hospitals are Calvary Hospital, Montefiore Medical Center's Jack D. Weiler Hospital, and NYC Health + Hospitals/Jacobi in Morris Park. The Albert Einstein College of Medicine campus is also located in Morris Park. In addition, Montefiore Medical Center's Wakefield Campus is located in Williamsbridge.

== Post offices and ZIP Codes ==
Eastchester is located within multiple ZIP Codes. Most of the neighborhood, specifically the part north of Boston Road, is located in 10466. The area south of Boston Road is divided into two ZIP Codes: 10475 east of Baychester Avenue and 10469 west of Baychester Avenue. The United States Postal Service operates two post offices nearby: the Hillside Station at 3482 Boston Road and the Co-op City Station at 3300 Conner Street.

== Education ==
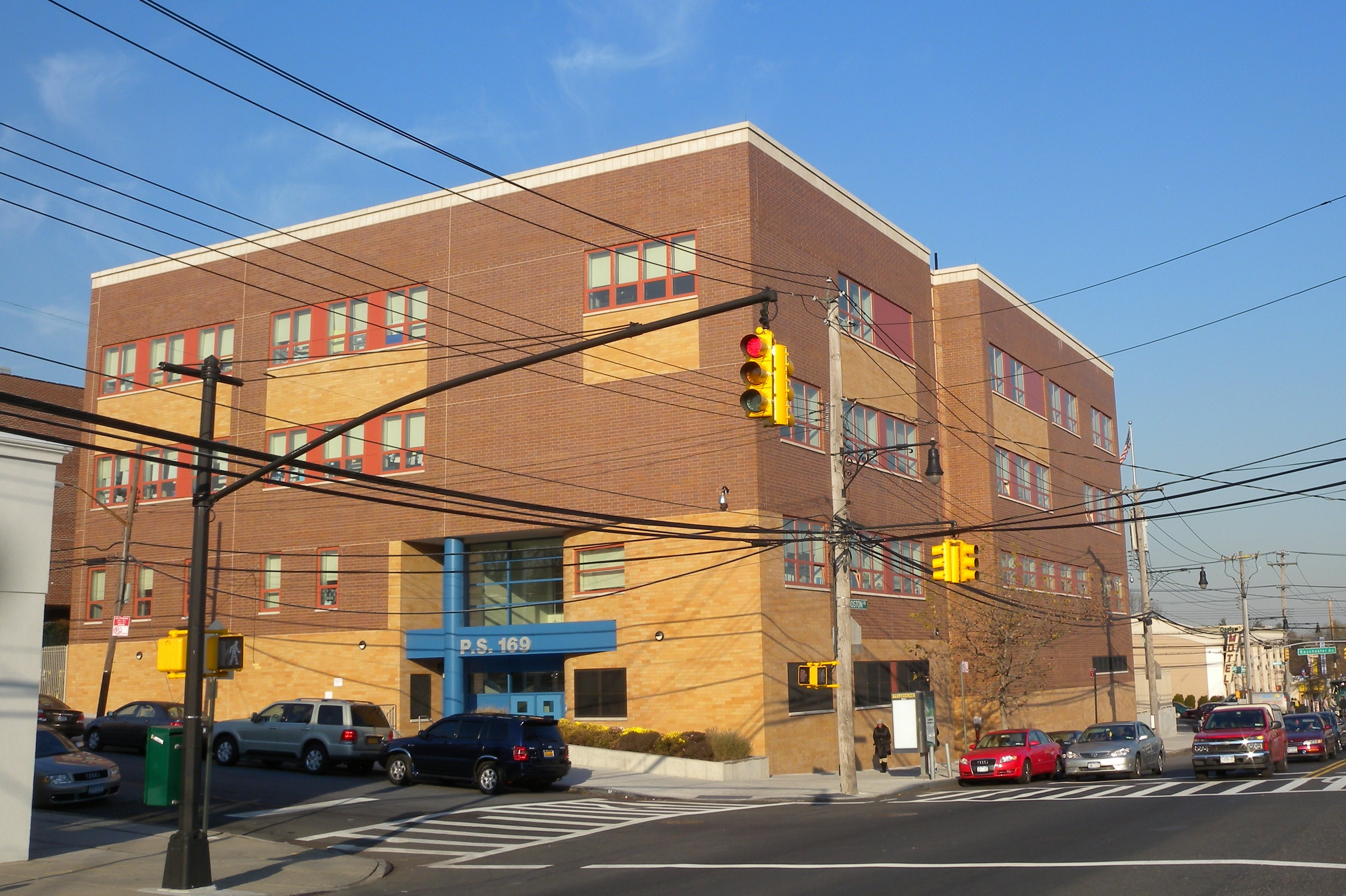
New school on Boston Road

Eastchester and Williamsbridge generally have a lower rate of college-educated residents than the rest of the city as of 2018. While 32% of residents age 25 and older have a college education or higher, 20% have less than a high school education and 48% are high school graduates or have some college education. By contrast, 26% of Bronx residents and 43% of city residents have a college education or higher. The percentage of Eastchester and Williamsbridge students excelling in math rose from 32% in 2000 to 48% in 2011, though reading achievement remained constant at 37% during the same time period.

Eastchester and Williamsbridge's rate of elementary school student absenteeism is slightly higher than the rest of New York City. In Eastchester and Williamsbridge, 29% of elementary school students missed twenty or more days per school year, more than the citywide average of 20%. Additionally, 70% of high school students in Eastchester and Williamsbridge graduate on time, about the same as the citywide average of 75%.

=== Schools ===
The former PS 15 was listed on the National Register of Historic Places in 1981. There are three public elementary schools, PS 68, PS 111, and PS 112. Sixth grade to eighth grade students attend John Philip Sousa MS 142. The only public high school in the area is Albert Tuitt Educational Campus; however, many students attend Harry S. Truman High School in neighboring Co-op City. Those seeking a parochial education can attend Cardinal Spellman High School (co-ed) or either Mount Saint Michael Academy (all boys) in Wakefield or St. Barnabas High School (all girls) in Woodlawn.

=== Libraries ===
The New York Public Library (NYPL)'s Edenwald branch is located at 1255 East 233rd Street. The one-story branch opened in 1973. In addition, the NYPL's Baychester branch is located at 2049 Asch Loop North in Co-op City. The one-story branch building opened in 1973 and was renovated in 2003.

== Transportation ==
Subway service is provided by the New York City Subway via the following IRT Dyre Avenue Line stations, served by the 5 train:

- Eastchester–Dyre Avenue
- Baychester Avenue

Bus service is provided by the following New York City Bus and Bee-Line Bus System routes:

- Bx16: to Pelham or Norwood–205th Street (via Nereid Avenue)
- Bx30: to Co-op City or Pelham Parkway (via Boston Road)
- BL52: to Eastchester, Bronx or Bronxville via Mount Vernon, New York
- BL55: to Eastchester, Bronx or Cross County Shopping Center (Yonkers)
- BL60: to Fordham, Bronx or White Plains, NY (via U.S. Route 1)
- BL61: to Fordham, Bronx or Port Chester, New York (via US Route 1)
- BL62x: to Fordham, Bronx or White Plains, NY (via US Route 1; Express from New Rochelle to East White Plains)

== Notable people ==
- 88-Keys (born 1976), record producer and rapper.
- Emmanuel Andújar (born 1992), professional basketball player and member of the Puerto Rico national basketball team. Raised in the Edenwald Houses.
- Jamaal Bowman (born 1976), U.S. Congressman; former school principal of Cornerstone Academy for Social Action located in Eastchester.
- DreamDoll (born 1992 as Tabatha Robinson), rapper/reality television personality (VH1 series "Bad Girls Club" and "Love & Hip Hop: New York"). Raised in the Edenwald Houses.
- Andy González (1951-2020), Latin jazz musician who was raised in the Edenwald Houses. Brother of Jerry González
- Jerry González (1949-2018), Latin jazz musician who was raised in the Edenwald Houses.Brother of Andy González
- Richard Hauptmann (1899-1936), German-born carpenter who was convicted of the abduction and murder of the 20-month-old son of Charles Lindbergh; at the time of his arrest he resided at 1279 East 222nd Street.
- Leo Isacson (1910-1996), attorney and politician notable for winning a seat in the United States House of Representatives from New York's 24th congressional district.
- Sharissa (born 1975), R&B singer who was raised in the Edenwald Houses.
- Scoochie Smith (born 1994), professional basketball player who was raised in the Edenwald Houses.
- Christopher Williams (born 1967), R&B singer and actor. Grew up in Edenwald Houses and on De Reimer Avenue.
- Kai Cenat
