= Glitch: The Rise & Fall of HQ Trivia =

2023 American documentary film

- Official poster
- Directed by: Salima Koroma
- Produced by: Ken Druckerman; Banks Tarver; Amy Entelis; Courtney Sexton; Dylan Abruscato; Brandon Teitel
- Edited by: Pierre Takal
- Production companies: Left/Right Productions; CNN Films; Max
- Distributed by: CNN Films; Max
- Release dates: March 5, 2023 (CNN); July 20, 2023 (Max)
- Running time: 90 minutes
- Country: United States
- Language: English

Glitch: The Rise & Fall of HQ Trivia is a 2023 American documentary film directed by filmmaker Salima Koroma. It was produced by former HQ Trivia employees, and is largely guided by the voice of former HQ host Scott Rogowsky. The film follows HQ Trivia, the trivia mobile game developed by Vine creators Rus Yusupov and Colin Kroll.

The film had its world premiere on CNN on March 5, 2023, and became available to stream on Max, the successor to HBO Max, beginning on July 20, 2023. In September 2023, it was removed from the streaming service after it was revealed that the film included doctored evidence.

== Synopsis ==
The film chronicles the rise and fall of HQ Trivia, the "game show on your phone" app.

People interviewed in the film include former HQ hosts Scott Rogowsky and Sharon Carpenter, along with technology journalists and experts such as Scott Galloway, Laurie Segall, and Taylor Lorenz.

== Release and Cancellation ==
The film had its world premiere on CNN on March 5, 2023. However, in September 2023, the film was removed from the streaming platform after it was revealed that at least one key piece of evidence in the documentary had been doctored. The evidence led Warner Bros. Discovery to pull the film from distribution.

== Reception and controversies ==
=== Critical reception ===
The film has an 88% approval rating on the review aggregator website Rotten Tomatoes. It was selected as a New York Times "Critic's Pick," with Calum Marsh praising Glitch as "slyer and smarter than some of its paint-by-numbers dramatized contemporaries," and describing the film as a "smart, briskly funny documentary."

Nate Adams of The Only Critic called the documentary "terrific" and "a must-see." In his review, Adams wrote, "Director Salima Koroma has assembled a nice parade of familiar faces within the tech sector to offer valuable logistics and understanding that paved the way for HQ's massive blow-up and eventual death." Nick Schager, the Entertainment Critic for The Daily Beast called the documentary "entertaining." In his review, Schager wrote, "The cautionary tale is a familiar one. But it's told with enough flashy verve and humor, along with a gossipy bombshell audio recording, to play as a breezy non-fiction look back at a phenom that had its 15 minutes—or, at least, enough time to get through an evening's worth of quiz questions—in the smartphone spotlight."

=== Doctored Evidence ===
In August 2023, it was revealed that Glitch included a doctored email attributed to HQ Trivia co-founder Rus Yusupov. The email, presented as primary evidence of Yusupov's alleged interference with media coverage, was proven to have been altered. The original email, provided by Yusupov's lawyers, showed no such interference, contradicting the film's claims. Following this discovery, Warner Bros. Discovery removed the documentary from its Max streaming platform. Neither the filmmakers nor CNN Films commented on the matter, leaving questions about the integrity of the production unresolved.

=== Unethical production practices ===
Schager also wrote that "Glitch: The Rise & Fall of HQ Trivia is a saga about foolishness and strife that has itself become mired in controversy." Rolling Stone reported that several former HQ employees pitched the documentary to CNN Films, with former HQ executives Dylan Abruscato and Brandon Teitel serving as executive producers. On February 10, 2023, technology reporter Alyssa Bereznak, the host of Boom/Bust: The Rise and Fall of HQ Trivia, raised concerns over CNN Films' ethical practices, revealed Scott Rogowsky's close collaboration with the network, and said that “Scott and other employees are not objective storytellers.”

=== Biased nature ===
The biased nature of the documentary has drawn criticism, particularly for the way Scott Rogowsky's influence appears to shape the narrative. The film is described as "Quiz Daddy's show," where the former host portrays himself as a hero who tried to mitigate the damage done by the feud between co-founders Rus Yusupov and Colin Kroll. Rogowsky's version of events is guided by his own interests, and his unreliability as a narrator becomes apparent when viewed alongside other sources. As Claire Spellberg Lustig writes, "Glitch is guided by Rogowsky's version of events, but it's difficult to read his heroic retelling as anything other than an attempt to depict himself in the best possible light" and cautioned that "Max subscribers should be mindful of the underlying narrative and all that's been excluded from it."

=== Omission of key perspectives ===
The documentary has been criticized for omitting key perspectives from its narrative. Sarah Pribis, who hosted HQ Trivia for over a year, expressed her concerns through a "TikTokumentary," detailing the toxic environment and sexism she experienced at the company. Pribis's voice was notably absent from the film, leading her to question "whose narrative they're telling and what pieces they're choosing to leave out." The film's director, Salima Koroma, stated that "Pribis was brought in for a pre-interview during filming—it's just that her story didn't make it into the final product." HQ Trivia co-founder Rus Yusupov cited potential conflicts and bias as his reason for not participating in the documentary.

=== Plagiarism claims ===
On February 10, 2023, Alyssa Bereznak wrote a Twitter thread about similarities of title, sources, artwork, and themes between her podcast and the trailer for Glitch: The Rise & Fall of HQ Trivia. She also said Koroma called her prior to the release of the documentary to ask questions about the HQ story. According to an interview Bereznak gave Rolling Stone, "the trailer flagged a ton of narrative similarities between the documentary and her podcast, something she thinks she should have been credited for."
