= Dom Hofmann =

American programmer and entrepreneur

- Born: Dominik Hofmann; September 27, 1986 (age 40); New York, U.S.
- Occupations: Entrepreneur; Programmer
- Years active: 2012–present
- Known for: Co-founding Vine and founding Peach and Byte
- Title: Co-founder of Vine
- Website: domhofmann.com

Dominik Hofmann (born September 27, 1986) is an American entrepreneur and programmer. He is best known for being one of the co-founders of Vine as well as being the creator of Peach, Byte and Loot.

== Career ==
=== Vine ===
In June 2012, Hofmann co-founded Vine, which was a 6-second video service with Rus Yusupov and Colin Kroll. Twitter acquired the app in 2012 for $30 million and the app was shut down by Twitter in 2016. During the shutdown process, Hofmann went public with his disagreement on how Vine was handled.

=== Peach ===
In January 2016, Hofmann introduced Peach at the Consumer Electronics Show in Las Vegas. The app received major media attention until Hofmann began to focus less on the app and more on other projects. In February 2019, Peach began looking for a benefactor to support upkeep and server costs of Peach. As of February 2024, Peach's domain registration for their website home page (peach.cool) expired and was hijacked by another buyer. This buyer posted an announcement on the peach.cool website falsely claiming to have acquired Peach. As of 2025, the app is no longer available on iOS or Android app stores.

=== Byte ===
Byte (formerly dubbed v2) was a 16-second looping video app. The app's purpose was to be the successor app to Vine after its original shutdown. Hofmann was public with his disagreement on how Vine was handled. The app was released for iOS and Android on January 24, 2020. It was later sold to Clash, another short-form video app, a year later. Both apps thus merged into a single app called Clash, which was then later renamed to Huddles. It was discontinued on May 3, 2023.

== Personal life ==
Hofmann was born in 1986. He has a younger brother and met Rus Yusupov and Colin Kroll while working at Jetsetter.
