= 2019 Webby Awards =

US internet awards ceremony

The 23rd annual Webby Awards were held at Cipriani Wall Street in New York City on May 13, 2019, and hosted by actress Jenny Slate.

The nominees were announced on April 2, 2019, and voting was open to the public. The winners were announced on April 23. Winners include Disney, which won Webby's 'Media Company of the Year', Hasan Minhaj, who won the 'Webby Special Achievement' award, and web series 'Fake News Writer', which won the Webby in Video Entertainment.

== Winners ==
(from and )

Category	Sub-Category	Webby Award Winner	People's Voice Winner
Webby	Video Person of the Year	Issa Rae	
Webby	Special Achievement	Michael Douglas	
Webby	Special Achievement	Hasan Minhaj	
Webby	Special Achievement	Desus Nice and The Kid Mero	
Webby	Social Movement	Greta Thunberg	
Webby	Artist of the Year	Tierra Whack	
Webby	Entrepreneur of the Year	Emily Weiss	
Webby	Network of the Year	BBDO	
Webby	Media Company of the Year	Disney	
Web	Activism	UNSTOPPABLE by Planned Parenthood	Everytown: Moments That Survive
Web	Architecture & Design	RLeviev Group	
Web	Art	Photo Exhibition "Brain Drool 2018"	
Web	Associations	SAG-AFTRA Website	Paralympicsgb
Web	Best Data Visualization	Billions of Birds Migrate. Where Do They Go?	
Web	Best Homepage	Barovier E Toso, Universal Love	
Web	Best Navigation/Structure	Rapha, Ocean Shock	
Web	Best Practices	Hodinkee; Safe Birth, Even Here	
Web	Best Use of Animation or Motion Graphics	Oat the Goat	Twenty One Pilots – Bandito
Web	Best Use of Photography	Inside the Border Crisis: Photos from the Front Lines	Project Greenland
Web	Best User Experience	Basic — Moves.	The Most Interesting Job Interview
Web	Best User Interface	Art4GlobalGoals	Google Earth Studio
Web	Best Visual Design – Aesthetic	Your 2018 Wrapped	Nuclear Dissent
Web	Best Writing (Editorial)	BBC Future	Previously Healthy
Web	Corporate Communications	Poki Company Website	Viacom.com
Web	Entertainment	YouTube Rewind 2018	Hook Studios
Web	Fashion & Beauty	i-D	Vogue.com
Web	Food & Drink	Kopke, The Oldest Port Wine House	Munchies
Web	Government & Civil Innovation	MPD Guardians	NASA
Web	Humor	The Daily Show Presents: The Donald J. Trump Presidential Twitter Library	
Web	News & Politics	FactCheck.org	The Washington Post
Web	Science	NOAA Fisheries	NASA Solar System Website
Web	Sports	NBA Draft Guide	Bleacher Report
Web	Television	The Best TV Episodes of the Century	Mister Rogers' Neighborhood
Web	Travel	Vacation with an Artist	Fodor's Travel
Web	Web Services & Applications	Squarespace	
Weird	Below the Surface	Cat Bounce!	
Online Film & Video	Entertainment	Fake News Writer, Director Dani Hanks, Writer Eric Pzena	Patriot Act with Hasan Minhaj
Online Film & Video	Music Video	This Is America by Childish Gambino	
Online Film & Video	Science & Education	The Verge – Verge Science	The Verge – Verge Science
Online Film & Video	Variety	The Late Show with Stephen Colbert "THE DOSSIER SPEAKS"	Good Mythical Morning
Online Film & Video	Best Editing	Justin	Kesha – "I Need a Woman"
Online Film & Video	Best Writing	Deadpool The Musical 2 by Paul Bianchi, Zamurai Productions	Honest Trailers
Online Film & Video	Best Individual Performance	James Corden's Next, James Corden	James Corden's Next, James Corden
Online Film & Video	Best Web Personality/Host	Stephen Curry's 5 Minutes From Home	Sean Evans – Hot Ones
Online Film & Video	Video Series & Channel	Critical Role	Critical Role
Mobile Sites & Apps	Best Streaming Service	HBO Now	
Podcasts	Arts & Culture	Still Processing	
Podcasts	Best Branded Podcast or Segment	TRAINED By Nike	The Sauce
Podcasts	Best Host	Pod Save the People	Ear Biscuits
Podcasts	Best Individual Episode	Dr. Death	Stay Tuned with Preet
Podcasts	Best Mini Series	The Great God of Depression from Radiotopia's Showcase	Believed
Podcasts	Best Original Music / Sound Design	Wolverine: The Long Night	Twenty Thousand Hertz
Podcasts	Best Series	Slow Burn Season 2	Serial
Podcasts	Best Writing	Serial Season 3	Stuff You Missed in History Class
Podcasts	Business	Business Wars	Freakonomics Radio – "After the Glass Ceiling, a Glass Cliff"
Podcasts	Comedy	My Dad Wrote a Porno	And That's Why We Drink
Podcasts	Crime & Justice	In the Dark (Season 2)	Criminal
Podcasts	Documentary	Ear Hustle	
Podcasts	Family & Kids	The Longest Shortest Time	Tai Asks Why
Podcasts	Health & Wellness	10% Happier	
Podcasts	Interview/Talk Show	Everything is Alive	
Podcasts	Lifestyle	Unladylike	Proof by America's Test Kitchen
Podcasts	News & Politics	Pod Save the People	Mueller, She Wrote
Podcasts	Science & Education	American History Tellers	StarTalk Radio with Neil deGrasse Tyson
Podcasts	Sports	30 for 30 Podcasts: "The Six Who Sat"	
Podcasts	Technology	The Future of Everything (Season 3)	Vergecast
Podcasts	Television & Film	How Did This Get Made?	The Daily Show: Ears Edition
Games	Best Action Game	Just Cause 4 by Square Enix	Warframe by Digital Extremes
Games	Best Adventure Game	Astroneer	
Games	Best Art Direction	Hellblade: Senua's Sacrifice	Astroneer
Games	Best Multiplayer/Competitive Game	Fortnite by Epic Games	Overwatch by Blizzard Entertainment
Games	Best Sound Design	God of War by Santa Monica Studio	Warframe by Digital Extremes
Games	Best Game Design	Florence	Astroneer
Games	Best Word & Trivia Game	HQ Trivia (Air Max Day), with Nike and R/GA	Heads Up!
Games	Best Visual Design	Gris	Astroneer
Games	Best Writing	We Happy Few	Hellblade: Senua's Sacrifice
Games	Puzzle	The Gardens Between	I Love Hue
Games	Sports	Asphalt 9: Legends	
Games	Technical Achievement	The Walking Dead: Our World	Star Trek Fleet Command
Social	Animals	The Dodo	Harlso the Balancing Hound
Social	Art & Culture	Drawings for My Grandchildren Instagram Account	
Social	Arts & Entertainment	Depeche Mode: 365 Days, 365 Fans	Breaking Ballet
Social	Best Overall Social Presence	The Tonight Show Starring Jimmy Fallon	
Social	Best Overall Social Presence (Brand/Org)	NASA	
Social	Best Photography & Graphics	National Geographic Instagram	
Social	Best Social Video Series	TED's Small Thing Big Idea	The Daily Show: Between The Scenes
Social	Best Use of Stories	New York Public Library Insta Novels	National Geographic Instagram
Social	Best Use of Video	Fyrestock by Shutterstock	Iceland 'Rang-Tan'
Social	Celebrity/Fan	Spotify – Tha Carter III Anniversary	The Ellen DeGeneres Show
Social	Corporate Communications	NASA Social Media	
Social	Culture & Lifestyle	Migrant Sound	National Geographic's Race Issue and #IDefineMe Campaign
Social	Education & Discovery	The Field Museum Instagram Account	NASA's Mars InSight Mission
Social	Entertainment	DC Comics Social Media	
Social	Events	Annex88's Never Made	Wieden+Kennedy's World Cup
Social	Events & Live Streaming	Verizon's Throwback Thanksgiving Parade 360 Live	The Late Show with Stephen Colbert: Best Live Streams of 2018
Social	Experimental & Innovation	BWM Dentsu's Project Revoice	Burger King "Whopper Detour"
Social	Fashion & Beauty	Vice Media's i-D	Teen Vogue Instagram Account
Social	Food & Drink	Bon Appétit	Tastemade
Social	Health & Fitness	Crecer Con Salud	WebMD
Social	How-To & DIY	Bold Beauty for the Transgender Community	PBS Two Cents
Social	Humor	@ConanOBrien	The Daily Show with Trevor Noah
Social	Lifestyle	Girlboss	Apartment Therapy
Social	Music	Contemporary Scenes	Depeche Mode: 365 Days, 365 Fans
Social	News & Politics	The Washington Post on Twitter	CNN
Social	Public Service & Activism	#WhyIDidntReport Instagram Account	Sleeping Giants Twitter Account
Social	Sports	HBO's #MyAndreStory	I Am Shaquem Griffin
Social	Television & Film	Schitt's Creek Social Media	
Social	Travel	Visit Britain – I Travel For	Atlas Obscura
Social	Weird	Address_The_Future	Laura Clery – Facebook Watch
Apps, Mobile & Voice	Art & Experimental	Jimmy Nelson – Homage to Humanity	David Bowie Is
Apps, Mobile & Voice	Best Practices	WW App	
Apps, Mobile & Voice	Best Streaming Service	HBO Now	
Apps, Mobile & Voice	Best Use of Augmented Reality	KLM Hololens	Night Sky
Apps, Mobile & Voice	Best Use of GPS or Location Technology	Dustee	Road Tales
Apps, Mobile & Voice	Best Use of Machine Learning	Adobe Spark	
Apps, Mobile & Voice	Best User Experience	Morse Code for Gboard	National Geographic
Apps, Mobile & Voice	Best User Interface	HBO Now	
Apps, Mobile & Voice	Best Visual Design – Aesthetic	Basic — Moves.	Calm
Apps, Mobile & Voice	Best Visual Design – Function	Tintoretto2go	Entale: The Visual Podcast App
Apps, Mobile & Voice	Best Writing	Mr. Robot: The Daily Five/Nine	
Apps, Mobile & Voice	Business & Finance	Harvard Business Review Management Tip	The Reimagined United Mobile App
Apps, Mobile & Voice	Connected Products & Wearables	Brixels	Muse: The Brain Sensing Headband
Apps, Mobile & Voice	Culture & Events	Anne Frank House	Unravel Van Gogh
Apps, Mobile & Voice	Education & Reference	Night Sky	Parents vs. Kids
Apps, Mobile & Voice	Entertainment	Reelgood for iOS	Marvel Unlimited
Apps, Mobile & Voice	Experimental & Innovation	Accessibility Mat	The New York Times – MagicLeap: David Bowie in Three Dimensions
Apps, Mobile & Voice	Family & Kids	Nickelodeon's Noggin	The Cat in the Hat Builds That
Apps, Mobile & Voice	Fashion & Beauty	Nike Reactor	Warby Parker Virtual Try-On
Apps, Mobile & Voice	Financial Services & Banking	TurboTax. Free Free Free Free Free Free!	MoneyLion
Apps, Mobile & Voice	Food & Drink	The Oh She Glows Plant-Based Recipe App	Nom Nom Paleo
Apps, Mobile & Voice	Health & Fitness	Headspace	
Apps, Mobile & Voice	Lifestyle	What to Expect's Pregnancy Due Date Calculator	Shine
Apps, Mobile & Voice	Music	SoundHound	
Apps, Mobile & Voice	News & Magazines	The Guardian app for iOS and Android	The New Yorker Today app
Apps, Mobile & Voice	Productivity	Monday.com	Trello
Apps, Mobile & Voice	Sports	Bleacher Report App	ESPN
Apps, Mobile & Voice	Travel	Hopper	Guides by Lonely Planet
Advertising & Media	Best Influencer Endorsements	BBDO New York's Monica Lewinsky – #DefyTheName campaign	
Advertising & Media	Best Use of Machine Learning		HBO's Westworld: The Maze
Advertising & Media	Experimental and Innovation	Accessibility Mat by GTB Brazil	
Advertising & Media	Best Launch	The Marvelous Mrs. Maisel Carnegie Deli Pop-Up by Tool	
Advertising & Media	Best Cause Related Campaign	#ExcuseMe by McCann NY	
Advertising & Media	Social Media Campaign	Bacardi – Live Moves by BBDO New York	
Advertising & Media	Best User Experience	The Most Interesting Job Interview by Cummins & Partners	
Advertising & Media	Public Service and Activism Branded Content	The Uncensored Playlist by MediaMonks	
Advertising & Media	Corporate Social Responsibility	Minecraft Coral Crafters by 215 McCann	
Advertising & Media	Branded Entertainment Short Form	Taco Bell's Web of Fries by Deutsch	
Advertising & Media	Integrated Campaign	Dream Crazy by Wieden+Kennedy	Dundee: The Son of a Legend Returns Home by Droga5
