= Kimberly Osorio =

American journalist, writer, author and TV producer

Kim Osorio
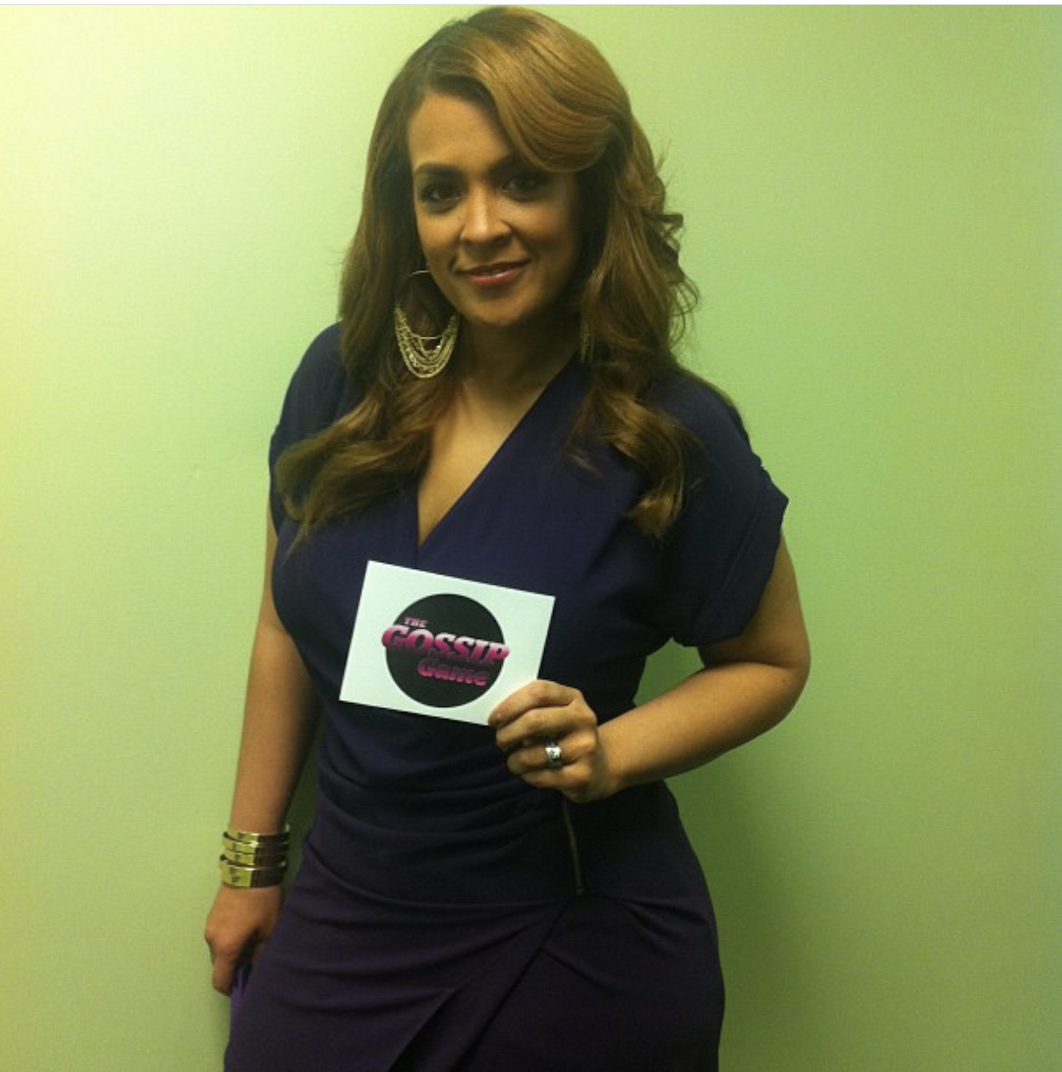
- Born: June 14, 1974 (age 52); The Bronx, New York, United States
- Other name: Kim Osorio
- Occupations: Editor, writer, TV personality
- Known for: The Source magazine lawsuit
- Title: Author, editor-in-chief of The Source magazine
- Children: 3
- Website: kimosorio.com

Kim Osorio (born June 14, 1974, in The Bronx, New York City) is an American journalist, writer, author, college professor, TV producer and personality. She was also a cast member on the reality TV series The Gossip Game on VH1.

== Life and career ==
=== Early life and education ===
Osorio was born in New York City to a Puerto Rican father and a mother of mixed racial background; African-American and Chinese American. She was raised in the Castle Hill section of the Bronx where she identified with hip-hop culture in its early years. She often speaks about the influence that it had on her life.

After obtaining a B.A. in Fine Arts from Fordham University, she earned a Juris Doctor from New York Law School.

Osorio pursued a writing career after law school, writing primarily about hip-hop music for music publications such as Billboard, The Source, Vibe, Oneworld and XXL magazine.

In 2000, Osorio began working at The Source as associate music editor. After two years, she was appointed to the position of editor-in-chief.

=== The Source ===
As the first female editor-in-chief in the history of The Source, she was featured on the cover of the New York Post's Tempo section, and was voted one of the Top 25 influential Latinos in New York. She was called upon by mainstream news outlets such as The O'Reilly Factor and Fox News' The Big Story with John Gibson, to represent hip hop culture.

During her time at the magazine, Osorio interviewed and wrote cover stories on a number of high-profile artists, including Jay-Z, Drake, LL Cool J, Rick Ross, The Wu-Tang Clan, Lil Kim, Foxy Brown, and Mase.

In March 2005, Osorio filed a harassment complaint with the magazine's human resources department, and was terminated shortly after. In response, she filed a federal lawsuit against The Source alleging sexual harassment, gender discrimination, defamation, retaliatory discharge, and maintaining a hostile work environment. The case went on for six days, with the jury returning a verdict in her favor. The judgment, originally reported at $15.5 million, was later disputed and knocked down to $8 million.

After entertainment attorney L. Londell McMillan acquired The Source in 2009, purchasing $3.75M of its debt, he re-hired Osorio. "In addition to hip hop, she has empowered women and writers in journalism for years. She is an excellent journalist online and off," said McMillan. Osorio returned to The Source as editor-in-chief in 2012 to help restore the magazine's credibility and solidify the brand's place in the hip hop arena. She left in 2013, to pursue a career full-time in television.

=== Television ===
While the lawsuit was ongoing in 2005–2006, Osorio accepted a job as executive editor at BET.com. There, she transitioned from writer to producer, and worked as on-air talent for BET news briefs and their weekly show The Black Carpet. Upon her departure from BET, she began to freelance for the cable network as a script writer, adding shows like Aaliyah: One in a Million, Notarized: The Top 100 Songs of 2011, and the BET Awards special The Chosen to her resume.

Osorio then became an editor-at-large at BET Interactive, an affiliate of Black Entertainment Television. In the summer of 2008, Osorio left BET.com to be the VP of Content at Global Grind, where she spent four months before returning to BET.com.

As a script writer, Osorio wrote host scripts for live and live-to-tape TV specials, including the Love and Hip Hop reunion specials, VH1's Hip Hop Honors, and various BET tentpole specials.

Osorio transitioned to non-scripted television in 2015, and has gone on to executive produce reality television shows such as Love and Hip Hop, Black Ink Chicago, Growing Up Hip Hop, Hustle in Brooklyn, Hustle & Soul, and The Impact: New York.

=== Books ===
In September 2008, Osorio released a book titled Straight From The Source: An Exposé from the Former Editor in Chief of the Hip-Hop Bible, detailing the events of her time at The Source.

== The Source lawsuit ==
=== Allegations ===
Osorio filed her report to the Equal Employment Opportunity Commission (EEOC) in 2005 with fellow employee ex-marketing VP Michelle Joyce, outlining their case of sexual harassment. The jury rejected the case brought forth by Joyce, but Osorio's case went ahead. It is now known that as early as 2004, Osorio had begun talking to lawyers regarding the merits of her case. The affidavit filed with the EEOC detailed the work environment at The Source, as well as threats and conduct of workers. Osorio soon after sent an e-mail to the magazine's Human Resources department outlining her complaint, and, after she refused to withdraw the e-mail she was fired. Her employers claimed this was because of poor performance, particularly her decisions on magazine covers and certain negative reviews of artists' CDs.

=== Trial ===
Osorio outlined the environment which was present at the magazine: employees often watched pornographic movies, hung pictures of females in G-strings, smoked pot and called women "bitches". She also claimed that untrue rumors were made of her being sexually involved with industry artists.

The trial lasted eight days, with Ray "Benzino" Scott being asked to leave, or threatened with removal from the courtroom by Judge Jed S. Rakoff. The Source filed for bankruptcy protection shortly before the verdict was handed down. Kenneth P. Thompson, who represented Osorio in her case, commented that he was not worried about the filing because "They're still a viable company."

After two weeks, a jury of six men and two women concluded that while Osorio had not been a victim of sexual harassment, the co-founders of The Source, David Mays and Scott, had in fact terminated her in retaliation, and that Scott had defamed her character in an interview. The total judgement was $7.5 million. "This verdict shows that all women must be treated with dignity and respect, no matter what industry they work in," attorney Thompson said.

In 2023, Osorio's story was featured on season 2 of the Louder Than a Riot podcast, in an episode which focused on misogyny in hip hop.

=== Aftermath of trial ===
On November 1, 2006, Judge Rakoff rejected the appeals of Mays, Scott and The Source.

== The Gossip Game ==
Osorio was a main cast member on the VH1 reality TV show The Gossip Game. The show followed the careers and personal lives of seven female media professionals working in the urban entertainment industry as radio personalities, journalists, and bloggers. The seven cast members were Vivian Billings, K. Foxx, JasFly, Sharon Carpenter, Candice Williams, and Angela Yee. The show focused on the competitive nature of media coverage of entertainment industry, as well as the particular difficulties female media professionals face when working in a male-dominated field.

The show was produced by VH1 in conjunction with Magilla Entertainment, Mona Scott-Young, and District Media. The Gossip Game consisted of eight episodes, with the premiere airing on VH1 on April 1, 2013.

== Filmography ==
=== Television ===
| Year | Series | Role | Network | Notes |
|---|---|---|---|---|
| 2016 | Hustle & Soul | Co-executive producer | WeTV | |
| 2016 | One Shot | Consulting producer | BET | |
| 2017 | VH1 Hip Hop Honors: 90's Game Changers | Consulting producer | VH1 | |
| 2017–2018 | Love & Hip Hop: New York (season 8) | Co-executive producer | VH1 | |
| 2018 | Hustle in Brooklyn | Co-executive producer | BET | |
| 2019 | Black Ink Crew Chicago (season 5) | Executive producer | VH1 | |
| 2019 | Growing Up Hip Hop New York (season 1) | Co-executive producer | WeTV | |
| 2019 | Love and Hip Hop (season 10) | Executive producer | VH1 | |
| 2021 | Growing Up Hip Hop (season 6) | Executive producer | WeTV | |
| 2022 | Rap City '22 | Co-executive producer | BET | |
| 2023 | My True Scam Story: Jennifer Williams | Executive producer | VH1 | |
| 2024 | The Impact: New York | Executive producer | VH1 | |
