= Astroneer =

2019 video game

- PlayStation 4 download release art
- Developer: System Era Softworks
- Publisher: System Era Softworks
- Producer: Veronica Peshterianu
- Designers: Jacob Liechty; Aaron Biddlecom; Ryan Burrell; Anthony Coleman; Andre Maguire
- Programmers: Brendan Wilson; Zabir Hoque; Sam Wolpert
- Artists: Adam Bromell; Paul Pepera; Spencer Kern
- Composer: Machinefabriek
- Engine: Unreal Engine 4
- Platforms: Windows; Xbox One; PlayStation 4; Nintendo Switch; PlayStation 5
- Release: Windows, Xbox One; February 6, 2019; PlayStation 4; November 15, 2019; Nintendo Switch; January 13, 2022; Playstation 5; November 20, 2025
- Genres: Sandbox, adventure
- Modes: Single-player, multiplayer

Astroneer, officially stylized in all caps, is a 2019 sandbox adventure game developed and published by American studio System Era Softworks. The game was released through early access in December 2016 before a full release on February 6, 2019. The player is tasked with colonizing planets, creating structures, and collecting resources. The character is called an Astroneer and the player can travel to planets to activate cores and complete the game. There are often rewards given to players upon completion of core activation, most notably a suit and/or visor.

== Gameplay ==
The Astroneer reshapes the environment using the Terrain Tool.

Astroneer is a sandbox adventure game played from a third-person view. Its open world planets, where in terraforming can take place, are subject to procedural generation, with the exception of some planet-specific resources. The player controls an astronaut (called an Astroneer) who navigates on foot, by rover, through teleportation, or by spacecraft. Navigating the planet is essential for finding resources, including materials and research items.

=== Crafting ===
Craftable items include rovers, printers, jets, buggies, tractors, spacecraft, storage silos, atmospheric condensers, research chambers, component smelters, batteries, generators, turbines, solar panels, and more shelters. The game contains two base crafting materials, Resin, and Compound, which can be found in abundance on all planets. Other, more rare resources can be found while exploring planets, or by using smelters, chemistry labs, or atmospheric condensers. Resources are used to create a variety of items when used by themselves or in combination with other materials using machines in the game. In order to craft more advanced items, players collect "bytes" which can be used to unlock new technology which is then available for crafting. When low on oxygen, the Astroneer recharges using portable oxygenators, snail creatures, or staying near craftable tethers, which can be chained from a base or oxygen-providing object over long distances to prevent suffocation while exploring. As of the game's full release, an "oxygenator" is required to provide extended reach of oxygen when tethering. To use an "oxygenator", you must either connect it to a shelter, or platform.

=== Terrain Tool ===
Every Astroneer has a Terrain Tool, which allows the player to gather resources and reshape the landscape. Resources, such as organic material, quartz, lithium, ammonium, resin, and the rarest, astronium, are neatly packaged by the Terrain Tool into convenient stacks. These stacks can then be snapped into slots on the Astroneer's backpack, storage units, research chambers, etc. Certain resources, such as titanite or clay, can be smelted or combined into more advanced materials. The Astroneer also has the option to research and craft upgrades to the Terrain Tool, which can be plugged and unplugged at will.

=== Backpack ===
Other than the Terrain Tool, the Backpack is the Astroneer's main tool. The Backpack functions as the player's inventory and HUD, with two quick-use slots, eight storage slots, a basic 3D printer, a small internal power supply (shown by a column of yellow segments), and a built-in oxygen tank (shown as a horizontal blue or red bar). The Terrain Tool, which also has three slots that can be used for storage (or to attach modifications to the Terrain Tool), hangs from the side of the Backpack when not in use. The Backpack also contains the Research Catalog, which the player uses to unlock new crafting blueprints.

== Plot ==
The game features an open-ended storyline that encourages creativity and self-paced progression, alongside optional tasks and missions that expand the game's lore through cutscenes and data logs.

The player begins the game aboard a man-made interstellar spacecraft originating from an unknown planet and lands on Sylva, the starting planet. In order to advance the main storyline, the player must discover and activate an alien Gateway Chamber before descending into the planet's subterranean layers. These layers become increasingly hazardous at greater depths. Once the player reaches the last layer, they need to descend through an alien structure. They travel to the Gateway Engine and activate it with a material that progressively gets harder to obtain, depending on the difficulty of the planet. The player must obtain seven Geometric Triptychs and place one on a terminal on top of them and one to keep when they reach the satellite. The player can safely warp to any Gateway Chamber that they have activated. This process is repeated for the rest of the planets and moons, Desolo, Calidor, Vesania, Novus, Glacio, and Atrox, listed from easiest to hardest. Once the player has procured all seven Triptychs, they can travel to a Gateway Portal and place them in their respective slots. An Odd Stone then appears at the center of the structure. Interacting with it triggers the ending cutscene and credits.

Aside from the main storyline, the game also features optional storylines which become available at various points throughout the game. These alternate storylines include the Wanderer's Way mission, the Space Snail rescue mission, the Rails Update mission chain, the Awakening Update missions, and Holiday Events.

If the player completes the main story, rails, and space snail [in-game dubbed "galastropod"] missions, along with producing nanocarbon alloy, being a resource in the game, they can access missions released in the Awakening Update. This mission includes references to the player community, the other missions, and the book "The Little Prince", which inspired several of the update's themes.

== Development and release ==
The game came about after Adam Bromell showed his friend Paul Pepera a "personal art project" consisting of a space man. According to Bromell, the two "started kind of riffing on this, like is there a possibility of a game in here?" Eventually, Pepera contacted two of his friends and the four started System Era to develop the game. At first, they worked on the game only part-time, after about two years of development Bromell in an interview stated that they were about ready to commit to the project full time.

The art style was partly inspired by a desire by Bromell to get away from something that looked like Minecraft, stating "there are enough games that do that already." Instead, the team adopted an art style that consists of "curved geometric, sort of broad vibrant colors." Bromell notes that the "no-frills" art style served a practical purpose as well, as it let them quickly build new ideas into the game. Initially, the game used a more traditional high-polygonal style, however after participating in a diorama building contest concerned with the "low-poly" style, he changed his mind.

Astroneer was announced in October 2015 by System Era Softworks and is developed with the Unreal Engine 4. Co-founder and lead artist Paul Pepera died on March 27, 2017, 4 months after Astroneer's early access release, but before the official release of the game.

Astroneer was first released in early access for Steam, Windows and Xbox One on December 16, 2016, before it officially released on February 6, 2019. A PlayStation 4 version was released on November 15, 2019, and released for the Nintendo Switch on January 13, 2022.

In November 2023, publisher Devolver Digital acquired System Era Softworks, with the studio continuing to publish Astroneer. The company had previously failed to acquire publishing rights to the game. In September 2024, System Era Softworks announced the "Glitchwalkers" expansion for Astroneer, introducing new planets and maps. In August 2025, System Era Softworks announced another expansion named “Megatech”, bringing new structures and technology to the game.

A native version for PlayStation 5 was released on November 20, 2025.

== Reception ==
Reception

Aggregate score
Aggregator	Score
Metacritic	(PC) 71/100 (Xbox One) 73/100 (Nintendo Switch) 76/100

Review scores
Publication	Score
GameSpot	6/10
Nintendo Life	8/10
Nintendo World Report	8.5/10
Shacknews	8/10
USgamer	4/5

Astroneer received "mixed or average reviews" from critics for Windows and Xbox One, and received "generally favorable reviews" for Nintendo Switch, according to review aggregator Metacritic.

Shacknews gave the game an eight out of ten, praising the atmosphere, exploration, crafting, base building, setting, casual survival elements, cooperative play, and pleasing aesthetics, while criticizing some minor technical issues. USgamer said that the game was "on the soft side of the survival spectrum", ultimately concluding that "[...] Astroneer falters in not having more interesting things to find within each planet. In the end though, it's a lovely little game if you want to survive without all the pesky hunger and thirst you find in other games." GameSpot lauded the game's aesthetics, art direction, accessible survival mechanics, oxygen tethering mechanic, and wide open spaces, while similarly taking issue with cumbersome inventory management, lack of interesting things to do on each planet, and technical issues. Nintendo Life reviewed the Switch port, praising the developer support, crafting, terrain tool, and how well the game suited the console, while calling out the choppy framerate, janky physics, and bad camera and controls.

In March 2022, System Era Softworks reported that Astroneer had sold over 3,740,000 units and had been played by over 8 million players.

=== Awards ===
Year	Award	Category	Result	Ref.
2019	SXSW Gaming Awards	Gamer's Voice: Video Game	Won	
2019	2019 Webby Awards	Adventure Game	Won	
2019	2019 Webby Awards	Best Art Direction (People's Voice)	Won	
2019	2019 Webby Awards	Best Game Design (People's Voice)	Won	
2019	2019 Webby Awards	Best User Experience	Won	
2019	2019 Webby Awards	Best Visual Design (People's Voice)	Won	
2020	2020 Webby Awards	Independent Creator	Won	

== Spinoff ==
In April 2025, Devolver Digital announced a multiplayer-focused spinoff, Starseeker: Astroneer Expeditions during a Nintendo Direct, which later released in early access on June 11, 2026 for Windows, Nintendo Switch 2, PlayStation 5 and Xbox Series X/S.
