= The Gardens Between =

- Cover art featuring the characters of Arina (left) and Frendt
- Developer: The Voxel Agents
- Publisher: The Voxel Agents
- Director: Henrik Pettersson
- Producers: Simon Joslin; Brooke Maggs
- Designers: Henrik Pettersson; Josh Alan Bradbury; Simon Joslin
- Programmers: Matt Clark; David Little
- Artists: Jonathan Swanson; Jessica Brett
- Writer: Brooke Maggs
- Composer: Tim Shiel
- Platforms: Linux, macOS, Windows, Nintendo Switch, PlayStation 4, Xbox One, iOS, Android, PlayStation 5
- Release: 20 September 2018: Linux, macOS, Windows, Switch, PS4 20 September 2018 Xbox One 29 November 2018 iOS 17 May 2019 Android 15 Jul 2020 PlayStation 5 16 June 2022
- Genres: Adventure, puzzle
- Mode: Single-player

The Gardens Between is an adventure/puzzle video game developed by Australian studio The Voxel Agents and published in September 2018 for Windows, macOS, Linux, Nintendo Switch, and PlayStation 4. It was later released for Xbox One in 2018, iOS in 2019, Android in 2020, and PlayStation 5 in 2022. A version for Meta Quest and Steam VR headsets with new elements was released as Hidden Memories of the Gardens Between in 2025. The game, which conveys its story through visuals and gameplay rather than dialogue or narration, follows two children, Arina and Frendt, in the treehouse in a garden between their houses. In a dreamscape, they progress through sets of island levels, each representing different shared experiences. The characters walk along a path that winds through each level, and the player solves environment-based puzzles that prevent the pair from reaching and activating a portal at the end of the path. To do so, the player controls the flow of time forwards and backwards and causes the characters to interact with nearby objects and spheres of light, rather than moving the pair directly.

The game was developed by The Voxel Agents over the course of four and a half years, beginning in 2014, based on a prototype idea from 2011 about playing a memory video back and forth. The island levels are derived from Japanese dry gardens, and are inspired by the developers' own childhoods. Tim Shiel, who composed the game's music, later released an album of music inspired by his tracks from the game, Glowing Pains: Music From The Gardens Between. Critics praised the game's art style and gameplay, as well as the wordless characterization of the two protagonists, though some found the puzzle difficulty uneven or the plot shallow. The Gardens Between won the "Game of the Year" award at the 2018 Australian Game Development Awards, a 2019 Apple Design Award, and the "Best Puzzle Game" award at the 2019 Webby Awards, and was nominated for several other awards.

== Plot ==
The plot of The Gardens Between is conveyed through visuals and gameplay, as no dialogue or narration is present in the game. It follows two children, named outside the game as Arina and Frendt, a girl and boy who live next door to each other and are close friends. On a rainy night, the two sneak out and hide in their treehouse, built on a small garden square between the houses. A light sphere forms in front of them, which causes the treehouse to fall into a vast dream ocean with sets of small islands representing their shared experiences, beginning with Arina moving into her house. They sail between the islands in the dreamscape to light a portal at the top of each one, and finally to a central island and a large portal. As they progress, the weather of the dreamscape becomes overcast and then rainy. At the end of each set of levels, a scene is shown of what memory the levels represented, and a constellation appears in the sky. Once the central island portal is lit, the islands all collapse into the ocean, leaving the pair in their treehouse. The next morning Arina and Frendt hug each other, as Frendt's family is now moving away. Arina waves goodbye as Frendt's family drives off. The VR version of the game, Hidden Memories of the Gardens Between, frames the levels as Frendt reminiscing over Arina's old diary decades later instead of the pair dreaming in the treehouse.

== Gameplay ==
One of the islands, based on Arina and Frendt building their treehouse

The Gardens Between is a puzzle game which consists of twenty-one levels, grouped into sets of two or three. Each level is an island littered with objects with a pathway winding through it. The goal of each level is to reach the portal at the top and activate it. Arina carries a lantern, which can absorb light from nearby sources. When lit, the lantern can be used to activate the portal when Arina is near it, or clear away purple fog that is otherwise solid. The lantern can also be given to cube-shaped creatures that jump around the level, and retrieved from them elsewhere. Frendt can activate chimes when he is near that open or close flowers that contain either a sphere of light for the lantern or a black sphere that absorbs the light.

The player does not control Arina and Frendt, but instead makes time pass forwards and backwards. As time moves forwards, the pair walk down the pathway with the viewpoint following them, sometimes taking different branches if the pathway is forked. The player cannot move time forward or backwards past a point where either Arina or Frendt cannot progress. Time does not pass uniformly for all objects; for example, Arina can collect light from a flower and then go backwards in time along the path with the light in order to give the now-lit lantern to a cube creature she had passed. Frendt can also activate devices that let the player move time forwards and backwards just for a specific object, such as a radio or garden hose. This may be needed to clear paths previously blocked, bring falling light flowers into close proximity to Arina, or similar actions. Other solutions may require lateral thinking that involve recognizing how the various time stream manipulations can interact.

== Development ==
The Gardens Between was developed by Australian studio The Voxel Agents over the course of four and a half years. The initial concept for the game was created in 2011 as part of a series of rapid prototypes for game ideas, with most centering on manipulating time. The Gardens Between's concept was inspired by a scene from the 2002 film Minority Report in which a character plays a video memory forwards and backwards by moving his hand back and forth. Although the concept was not turned into a game then, when game director and designer Henrik Pettersson rejoined the studio in 2014 The Voxel Agents began to expand the concept into a full game. An early prototype in 2014 included the concept of walking up a path on an island, as well as puzzles such as bringing a flaming torch past a waterfall by setting a falling stick on fire and then rewinding time so that it would light a beacon further up the path.

The initial version of the game was a puzzle game using the story of Little Red Riding Hood, but the team wanted to use an original story instead, which was created by narrative designer Brooke Maggs. The game's narrative retained some elements of fairy tales early in development, but soon shifted to use fantastical elements that were more surreal and less taken from existing fantasy stories, and also to use the "Voyage and Return" narrative archetype such as in Alice's Adventures in Wonderland , Pan's Labyrinth, and Coraline. The music was inspired by Icelandic composers and ambient music, and the composer, Tim Shiel, was involved early in the design process so that his music would match the tone of the game being created.

The designers refer to the levels as islands or gardens, and their art style was derived from Japanese dry gardens, with the structure of each garden creating "harmonic asymmetrical silhouettes". Each garden represents a moment in Arina and Friendt's friendship, with the elements of the level used for "environmental storytelling" to show what about that moment was meaningful to the pair. The moments the gardens represent were inspired by the designers' own childhoods. The levels were designed using a combination of "logical design", where the developers would draw out the timelines of the parts of the level and how they could intersect, and "thematic design", where they would take objects that relate to the part of the story for that level, and decide how they could interact with time.

Arina and Friendt were designed to have very different personalities, with Arina "fearless, headstrong and fiercely independent" and Frendt "constantly curious and wandering". Lead animator and designer Josh Alan Bradbury has said that the overall concept was to convey moments that are meaningful to the pair as children, rather than ones that would still be special when they are adults. Moving back and forth in time through the memories was intended to be a metaphor for reliving the same moments through nostalgia, remembering them in different ways and coming to a collectively remembered version of the events with friends.

The Gardens Between was released for Windows, macOS, Linux, Nintendo Switch, and PlayStation 4 on 20 September 2018, and for Xbox One on 29 November 2018. It was later released for iOS devices on 17 May 2019, Android on 15 Jul 2020, and PlayStation 5 on 16 June 2022. A VR version of the game for Meta Quest and Steam VR headsets, adding motion controls for Frendt's interactions with objects, was released as Hidden Memories of the Gardens Between on August 7, 2025. Previous titles by The Voxel Agents had been released first or only for mobile devices; executive producer Simon Joslin has said that not primarily designing the game for mobile devices changed their relationship with how they were developing the game and their expectations for it. Tim Shiel released an album of music inspired by and using elements of his tracks from the game as Glowing Pains: Music From The Gardens Between on 12 October 2018. It was published as both a digital album and a vinyl record with two additional tracks.

== Reception ==
Reception

Aggregate scores
Aggregator	Score
Metacritic	PC: 80/100; PS4: 75/100; Switch: 79/100; XONE: 81/100
OpenCritic	78% recommend

Review scores
Publication	Score
GameSpot	8/10
Jeuxvideo.com	15/20
Nintendo World Report	9/10
Pocket Gamer	4/5
TouchArcade	4/5
USgamer	4/5

The Gardens Between won the "Game of the Year" award at the 2018 Australian Game Development Awards, was nominated for "Excellence in Visual Art" at the 2018 Independent Games Festival, and won a 2019 Apple Design Award. It won "Best Puzzle Game" award at the 2019 Webby Awards and was additionally nominated for "Best Art Direction", and was nominated for "Gamer's Voice: Video Game" at the 2019 SXSW Gaming Awards. It was also nominated for "Best Audio/Visual Accomplishment" at the 2020 Pocket Gamer Mobile Games Awards.

Critics were "generally favorable" towards the game, according to the review aggregator Metacritic. Fellow review aggregator OpenCritic assessed that the game received strong approval, being recommended by 78% of critics. The gameplay was praised, with Caty McCarthy of USgamer and Jay Castello of Rock Paper Shotgun praising the variety of puzzle mechanics that were continually added throughout the game. Peter Brown of GameSpot and Daan Koopman of Nintendo World Report found the puzzles clever and Emily Sowden of Pocket Gamer called them "nicely balanced". Edwin Evans-Thirlwell of Eurogamer applauded the "moments of real delight" in some of the puzzles. Colin Campbell of Polygon concluded that the gameplay managed to be interesting without being frustrating and that the game ended before it could become boring or stretched too far. The USgamer and Rock Paper Shotgun reviews did both find, however, that the difficulty of the puzzles was uneven, with several puzzles, particularly towards the end of the game, being too easy and straightforward. The Eurogamer reviewer similarly claimed that the puzzles became less interesting towards the end of the game, while a reviewer for Jeux Video stated that the game as a whole, while interesting without being over-complicated, was too easy for a puzzle game.

The presentation of the game was also praised; the Nintendo World Report review applauded the "stunning art style", while Lindsay Mayhew of TouchArcade liked that it told its short story without "pointless filler". The GameSpot, Eurogamer, and Rock Paper Shotgun reviews heavily praised the wordless characterization of Arina and Frendt, and the Jeux Video and USgamer reviewers praised the integration of the story and gameplay, though the GameSpot review disagreed. Rock Paper Shotgun and GameSpot liked the story's themes, though the Polygon reviewer felt that a story about children growing up was an overused trope in indie games. Both the USgamer and Eurogamer reviewers found the story to be too sweet and straightforward, as there was no conflict between the two characters, and the Jeux Video reviewer similarly called the story sweet but shallow; Evens-Thirlwell of Eurogamer said that "best friendships are rarely this untroubled", and that it was a missed opportunity not to use that in the gameplay. The music was not remarked upon in many reviews, but the Touch Arcade reviewer praised the soundtrack, and the Jeux Video reviewer said that it was nice though unvaried. Several reviews concluded that the game was short but sweet, with the game's length matching the type and depth of the story it told while keeping any flaws from being overwhelming.
