= Peach (social network) =

Former social media app

- Screenshot The Peach app on an iPhone
- Original author: Dom Hofmann
- Developers: Byte, Inc
- Initial release: January 7, 2016; 10 years ago
- Operating system: iOS, Android
- Platform: Social networking, mobile application
- Website: peach.cool

Peach is a mobile application-based social network created by Dom Hofmann. It was released in 2016. Peach is available as an Android and iOS application. An unofficial web application was also released by Hofmann.

== History ==
Peach was introduced at the January 2016 Consumer Electronics Show in Las Vegas. It reached the top 10 in iOS networking apps on the weekend after its release. An unofficial web version was also released in late January 2016; downloads had already slowed since the app was unveiled. Bloomberg Business noted that when it was introduced, "[e]verything about Peach... seemed hip, down to the URL", but that by the end of the month, "interest in Peach softened". Six weeks after its debut, an official Android version of Peach was released.

In February 2019, Peach began looking for a benefactor to support upkeep and server costs of Peach after a two-week outage. Developers had their attention focused on other projects and stated that they could no longer afford to keep Peach running with only passive upkeep.

In late 2023, Peach's domain registration for their website (peach.cool) expired and was purchased by a buyer unaffiliated with Peach. An announcement was then posted on the peach.cool website by this buyer claiming to have acquired Peach. Hofmann denied the acquisition of Peach in February 2024, admitting that he let the domain expire and was not able to renew it in time. He also said that the actual underlying Peach service was still running and under his control from a different domain.

As of 2025, the app is no longer listed on the Google Play Store or the iOS App Store.

== Features ==
Peach was compared to Ello, Path, and App.net at the time of its release.

Peach featured "magic words," which were compared to Slack's similar slash shortcuts. These allowed the user to access commonly used functions, such as typing the letter "g" to send a GIF or "c" to bring up a calendar, similar to a command line interface.

Peach eschewed the traditional news feed, hashtagging, and tagging common to social networks. Matthew Hussey, editor-in-chief of The Next Web, described Peach as a hybrid of Twitter and Slack. He noted that some users of Peach were creating fake celebrity accounts.
