= Huddles (app) =

Video-sharing application

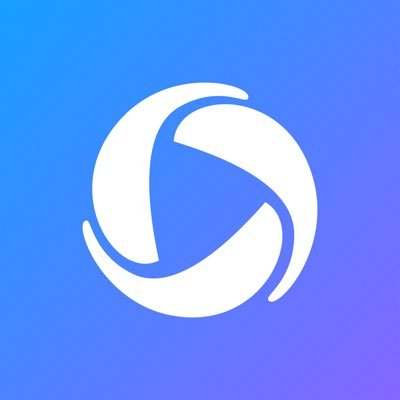
- Logo
- Other names: V2 (code name); Byte; Clash
- Original authors: Brendon McNerney & Dom Hofmann
- Developers: Byte Inc. (2017–2021); Clash App, Inc. (2021–2023)
- Initial release: January 24, 2020; 6 years ago – May 3, 2023; 3 years ago
- Final release: 3.0.2 (iOS); 3.0.2 (Android)
- Operating system: iOS; Android
- Predecessor: Vine
- Size: 66.3 MB (iOS); 26.5 MB (Android)
- Available in: 41 languages
- Type: Video sharing
- License: Proprietary software
- Website: huddlesapp.co

Huddles, originally known as Byte and later Clash (via acquisition), was an American short-form video hosting service and creator monetization platform social network where users could create looping videos between 2–16 seconds long. It was created by a team led by Brendon McNerney and PJ Leimgruber who formerly worked together at NeoReach, Inc. Dom Hofmann was involved as the architect of much of the code, as the founder of Byte, a successor to Vine, which Hofmann co-founded, until the project was sold to Clash App, Inc., and subsequently renamed.

Initially teased as v2, it was branded as Byte in November 2018. After a three-year closed beta, it officially launched on Apple's App Store and the Google Play Store on January 24, 2020. It was later sold to Clash, another short-form video app, a year later. Both apps thus merged into a single app called Clash, which was then later renamed to Huddles. It was discontinued on May 3, 2023.

== History ==
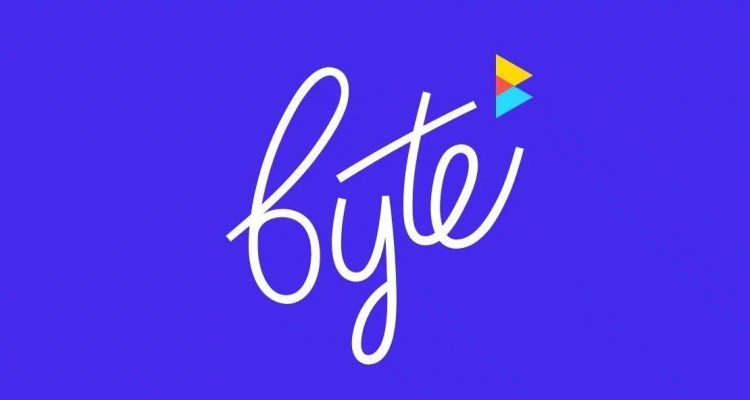
Byte's logo during beta in 2018

Byte's predecessor, Vine, was founded in June 2012. It was acquired by Twitter in October 2012. It underwent a staggered update on iOS, Android, and Windows Phone systems throughout much of 2013. The main Vine app was shut down by Twitter in January 2017, disallowing all new videos to be uploaded. The Vine homepage was made into an archive, with users being able to view previously uploaded content. As of 2019, the archive is no longer available, though individual videos are still able to be accessed via their direct link.

Vine co-founder Dom Hofmann announced in December 2017 that he intended to launch a successor to Vine. At the time, he called it "v2". In May 2018, he posted an update that the project was being put on hold. Among other things, he said that the biggest reason for this was "financial and legal hurdles". He said that his intention was to fund the new service himself as a personal project, but the attention that the announcement generated suggested that the cost to build and run a service that was sustainable at launch would be too high. In November, he announced that the project was moving forward again with funding and a team, under the new "Byte" branding. At the time, the website invited users to sign up for updates and for content creators to join its "creator program". The partner program was shut down in August, with the byte team announcing that they "will be using this time to take everything [they've] learned and apply it toward future opportunities and programs".

Byte was officially launched to the public on the iOS and Android platforms in over 40 countries on January 24, 2020, with the tagline "creativity first". Additionally, the company has promised a program that intends to compensate creators for their work. In the media Byte was referred to as a direct competitor to TikTok and Likee, similar video sharing platforms popular with teens.

On January 26, 2021, it was announced that Clash, another short-form video app, would be acquiring Byte. The deal was finalized the following month, with both apps merging into a single one called Clash. After months of beta testing, Clash was publicly available on App Store on October 12, 2021. It became available for Android two months later in 41 languages.

On May 3, 2023, Huddles announced its discontinuation as a standalone service via a series of tweets and a Medium blog post. The company began to remove the Huddles app from the Apple's App Store and Google Play Store in a phased manner, with the process commencing immediately upon announcement. According to Huddles, the aim of this decision was to avoid having an inactive login screen visible to users. The Medium post titled "Huddles is joining a larger Creator family" provided more context on the development, revealing that Huddles was transitioning towards becoming part of a broader 'Creator family'. Further details about what this 'Creator family' entails or how Huddles' integration would unfold were not disclosed in the initial announcement.

== Features ==
Huddles allowed users to publish videos between 2–16 seconds long, either captured through the app or previously recorded and stored on their devices. Similarly to other social media platforms, Huddles allowed users to follow other accounts. New accounts automatically followed Huddles's official account on their service. The main home screen used to feature a scrollable feed of content from accounts that the user was following. The platform also supported the ability to "like" and "rebyte" videos. In November 2020, a color customizer and a chat feature were added. The app also featured a search screen with tiles for popular and latest content along with video categories like comedy, animation and others.

== See also ==
- TikTok
- Twitter
- Vine
