= Colin Kroll =

American entrepreneur (1984–2018)

- Born: May 17, 1984; Rye, New York or Detroit, Michigan, U.S.
- Died: c. December 16, 2018 (aged 34); New York City, U.S.
- Education: Oakland University
- Occupation: Entrepreneur
- Years active: 2007–2018
- Known for: Co-founded Vine and HQ Trivia

Colin Kroll (May 17, 1984 – c. December 16, 2018) was an American entrepreneur who co-founded the video hosting service Vine and the trivia game app HQ Trivia.

== Early life and education ==
Kroll was born in Rye, New York, or Detroit, Michigan, the son of Alan Kroll. After his parents' divorce when he was 10, Kroll was raised in the suburbs of Detroit, graduating from Bloomfield Hills Andover High School, and then dropping out of community college to work on coding projects for local businesses.

Kroll eventually returned to school, attending Oakland University where he studied computer science.

== Career ==
Kroll worked as an engineering manager at Right Media, a subsidiary of Yahoo!, from 2007 to 2009 and as chief technology officer at Jetsetter from 2009 to 2013. He met Rus Yusupov and Dom Hofmann while working at Jetsetter. Hofmann, Kroll and Yusupov founded the video hosting service Vine. Kroll worked as general manager of Vine through 2014. Vine was acquired by Twitter in 2012 (though was shut down 4 years later). After working at Twitter following the acquisition, Kroll was dismissed following "bad management" and extensive allegations of workplace sexual harassment of women. Kroll and his business partner Yusupov formed Intermedia Labs, the company behind HQ Trivia. The real-time trivia game app was launched in 2017, climbing to the top of Apple's free game app chart during the early months of 2018. Kroll and another board member forced Yusupov, who was the CEO of Intermedia Labs, out of his position and Kroll took over as CEO in September 2018.

== Death ==
Police were called to Kroll's apartment in SoHo, Manhattan shortly after midnight on December 16, 2018, when his girlfriend became concerned after making multiple unsuccessful attempts to contact him by phone throughout the previous day. Kroll was found dead in his bedroom of a drug overdose. Drugs found in his system included fentanyl, 4-Fluoroisobutyrfentanyl, heroin and cocaine, the New York City medical examiner said, ultimately determining Kroll's cause of death to be "accidental overdose by fentanyl-laced heroin."
