= The Gossip Game =

- Genre: Reality
- Starring: Angela Yee; Candice "Ms. Drama" Williams; Jas Fly; K. Foxx; Kimberly Osorio; Sharon Carpenter; Vivian Billings
- Theme music composer: Kat Capone
- Opening theme: "Find Me In The Music"
- Country of origin: United States
- No. of seasons: 1
- No. of episodes: 8

Production
- Executive producers: Brad Abramson; Brian Flanagan; Jay Griffin; Jeff Olde; Laura Palumbo Johnson; Matthew Ostrom; Mona Scott-Young; Sean Lee; Shelly Tatro; Tom Ciaccio; Tone Boots; Warren Cohen
- Running time: 21 to 23 minutes
- Production companies: District Media; Magilla Entertainment; Monami Entertainment

Original release
- Network: VH1
- Release: April 1 – May 20, 2013

The Gossip Game is an American reality television series on VH1 that debuted on April 1, 2013, and chronicles the lives of seven media personalities who cover the urban entertainment market and reside in New York City.

Cast member Vivian Billings confirmed via her blog in June 2013 that the series would not be returning for a second season.

== Cast ==
- Angela Yee
- Candice "Ms. Drama" Williams
- JasFly
- K. Foxx
- Kimberly Osorio
- Sharon Carpenter
- Vivian Billings

== Episodes ==
No.	Title	Original release date	U.S. viewers (millions)
1	"Trading in the Gossip Game"	April 1, 2013	0.99
In the series premiere, the group learns about Kim's Source Magazine releasing their new ranking of the top radio personalities which could lead to some of the ladies dropping in the social scene ranking. JasFly secretly surprises K.Foxx and Angela Yee for a double interview without telling them prior. Later, Angela's hosts a Blogger Appreciation event, which ends up with drama erupting.
2	"Ratchet to Ratchet"	April 8, 2013	0.91
At the end of Angela's event, Candice stirs the pot and has Vivian furious. JasFly attempts to calm things down and figure out who started the drama while Kim tries to round everyone together so they can partake in a roundtable discussion on hip hop. Meanwhile, K.Foxx has a conversation with her program director Ebro regarding some comments that were made on air. Later, during Angela's birthday celebration, Sharon is set-up on a date and Kim unsuccessfully tries to bring peace between Vivian and Candice.
3	"Steppin' Out"	April 15, 2013	1.05
Kino, Kim's husband, brings up a promise that Kim made ten years ago — a threesome. Vivian and her husband consult the duo on their decision. Sharon gets emotional after she has a hard time balancing her professional life in the fast lane and her personal life. Candice works on a photo shoot to relaunch her brand and hosts a revealing party, which ends up straining her friendship even more with JasFly.
4	"Who's Smashing Who?"	April 22, 2013	1.34
Vivia is informed of some gossip relating to K.Foxx's sex life but K.Foxx isn't too happy when she learns of the news. Sharon is offered a job for a blog but is turned off after she discovers that Candice has been working there and offends JasFly as well. Candice goes straight to Angela and Sharon to question them about her rude comments.
5	"Foaming at the Mouth"	April 29, 2013	1.04
JasFly informs Kim and The Source an exclusive story about Kia Jeffries, who killed her ex-husband, but she then finds out that stories don't pay too much. Sharon reconnects with an old love interest but is left alone. Vivian's cousin, Star, starts drama while on the Steph Lova show — which fuels the fire between Vivian and Stephanie.
6	"Behind the Backstabbing"	May 6, 2013	0.85
K.Foxx is asked by Wyclef Jean to partake in one of his music videos. JasFly is tired of being single and breaks her own rule of "no dating industry men". Kim has to deal with the heavy aftermath of Vivian and Stephanie's drama.
7	"Turned Up and Twirl'd Out"	May 13, 2013	0.92
Vivian listens to Kim's advice and attempts to fix the issues with Stephanie as well as Star. K.Foxx begins to start an alliance with Candice and JasFly but she later begins to see that the anger between them is deep. Sharon hosts a birthday celebration, without inviting Candice, either way the drama finds its way.
8	"Slinging Mud"	May 20, 2013	0.86
In the series finale, Sharon and Candice continue to talk bad about each other. K.Foxx creates drama after she publicly criticizes Sharon, Vivan and Angela — who band together to get revenge at an upcoming event. The drama from the party forms pushes the ladies over the edge — which leads to an altercation between Angela and K.Foxx.
