= HQ (video game) =

Live mobile trivia game

- HQ's main logo
- Publisher: Intermedia Labs
- Designers: Rus Yusupov; Colin Kroll
- Platforms: iOS; Android
- Release: August 26, 2017 (iOS); December 31, 2017 (Android); August 14, 2018 (tvOS)
- Genre: Trivia game

HQ was a mobile trivia game developed by Intermedia Labs for iOS, Android, iPadOS, and tvOS. First released in 2017, the HQ app allowed users to participate in daily, live, trivia games in which they could win or split prize money. HQ was developed by Vine creators Rus Yusupov and Colin Kroll and credited as a production of Intermedia Labs.

The app's original game was HQ Trivia, in which players had 10 seconds to answer multiple-choice questions that increase in difficulty. Additional games, such as HQ Words and HQ Tunes, were later added. The last HQ games were supposed to be hosted once a week, with a prize pot of $1,500, and typically saw about 15,000 players each.

On February 14, 2020, Intermedia Labs Trivia sent a memo to staff stating the company would "cease operations and move to dissolution". However, four days later, Yusupov said he had a tentative deal in place with another company to purchase the HQ franchise and keep it operational. On March 29, HQ Trivia resumed its daily games.

While HQ never officially announced a shutdown, it has not had a game since November 17, 2022. The app was removed from both the Apple App Store and Google Play Store on August 5, 2023.

== History ==
The game's original concept, a gameshow hosted by astronauts, was created by Rus Yusupov, who had been experimenting with the idea at his tech incubator, Big Human, prior to co-founding Intermedia Labs. HQ Trivia was first released on August 26, 2017, for iOS, and on December 31, 2017, for Android. Shows were broadcast live from New York City. The primary host of HQ Trivia was initially Scott Rogowsky. In April 2019, Rogowsky was replaced by Matt Richards as the primary host of the game after negotiations between HQ and Rogowsky broke down over his new baseball show on DAZN. Richards, a stand-up comedian from Queens, New York, who has played comedy roles in several TV shows, had previously worked regularly for HQ Trivia as a fill-in host. Additional hosts included Sharon Carpenter (who was also the main host for the British games), Sarah Pribis, David Magidoff, Sian Welby, Alexandra Maurer (regular host for the German games), Leonie Zeumer, Lara Falkner, Kathryn Goldsmith, Lauren Gambino, Lyndsey Rodrigues, and, exclusively for the British games, Beric Livingstone.

HQ has been made available worldwide—with the exception of Russia and India—on the iOS App Store and Google Play. The average number of participants has ranged from 100,000 to 125,000. The app's record high of concurrent players was 2.38 million on March 28, 2018.

On February 14, 2020, it was announced that the app would immediately cease operations after its primary investors had stopped funding the company and a potential sale of HQ to an "established business" fell through. A final episode of HQ After Dark was aired that night, hosted by Matt Richards and Anna Roisman. The show ended with Richards showering Roisman and himself with a large bottle of champagne. The final payout was between $0.00–$0.01 per player, split between just over 500 players, as $5 was the final jackpot prize, which Richards said he paid for out of his own pocket.

On February 18, 2020, Yusupov said on Twitter that he had reached a tentative deal with an unspecified company to purchase the HQ franchise, thus allowing it to continue in the near future. On March 29, Yusupov publicly announced that HQ was resuming operations that evening. During the first game, host Matt Richards announced that HQ was donating $100,000 to World Central Kitchen, founded by José Andrés.

For other game shows that were added, Anna Roisman regularly hosted HQ Words, Melody Alanna was the host of HQ Tunes, Lauren Gambino served as the host of HQ Sports, and Matt Friend was the host of HQX. These shows were all discontinued in February 2020, and HQ Sports returned (with Gambino) in May 2020.

In May 2020, The Ringer released a podcast called Boom/Bust: The Rise and Fall of HQ Trivia that charts the app's rise and fall. The eight-part series includes interviews from host Alyssa Bereznak with fans, former HQ employees, and venture capitalists about the game's initial popularity, the chaotic work environment of Intermedia Labs, and what led to its initial shut down.

The app has not hosted an official game since November 17, 2022, breaking from its once-weekly game schedule. Additionally, the servers used by the app are not online, rendering all app features non-functional and the domains non-responsive. From January 15, 2023, the HQ app displayed a message stating it had been taken over.

During the takeover of the HQ app, an HQ Trivia game was hosted on January 20, 2023, by actor Fard Muhammad, with a prize amount of $50. An intended HQ Words game was canceled after the holder of the HQ domain retook control of the site on January 23. The app has since been jailbroken, resulting in more unauthorized games.

=== International versions ===
Versions of the game for markets outside of the United States have included:

- HQ Trivia Australia, which aired its final game on August 9, 2018, just 12 days after the first show aired on July 25, 2018.
- HQ Trivia Germany, which announced their last game on August 11, 2018.
- HQ Trivia UK, which announced a "break" as they prepared for HQ Words on December 5, 2018.

== Games ==
=== HQ Trivia ===
HQ Trivia took the form of a live trivia game, which usually aired daily at 9 pm US Eastern Time. On Fridays, the game's format shifted for HQ Tunes, until that game ceased in February 2020. In 2018, the app broadcast games in Germany, Australia, and the UK. However, international games were discontinued shortly afterward.

The host asks a series of increasingly difficult multiple choice questions, each with three possible answers. Players who choose the correct answer within the 10-second limit earn points and move on; the rest are eliminated. Any question that eliminates the majority of players is deemed a "savage question". In the usual case that multiple people correctly answer all the questions, the prize is split between all the respective winners. As of March 2020, the prize for games had ranges from $5 to $400,000 in addition to a points jackpot that was also split evenly amongst the winners. Players can purchase "Extra Lives" – or earn them through gameplay or by inviting additional players – and are able to use up to three to return to the game after being eliminated. In addition, players can earn "Erasers" by playing two other nearby HQ Trivia players to eliminate one of the wrong answers to a question.

HQ Trivia partnered with Nike, Wendy's, Warner Bros. and other organizations to promote products and movies such as Rampage, Fantastic Beasts: The Crimes of Grindelwald, Ready Player One, and The Lego Movie 2. Special modes of gameplay included formats such as "Winner Takes All" and "The 100".

In May 2019, the game began offering prize money (later, game "Coins") to those who correctly answer specific questions within the game, rather than only those who correctly answered all the questions. The number of questions for the 9 pm ET shows were also increased and the prize pots for those shows were increased to accommodate this.

Additional modifications to the game included a format change in which the game ran over the course of a shorter "season" played over several days or weeks. In each season, players could level up via point accumulation to gain special advantages in all game modes (except HQX) such as bonus strikes in Words and Free-Passes for questions in Trivia, Sports, and Tunes. Also, a mini-game called Daily Challenge offered 12-question (non-hosted) rounds which could be played when none of the main games were in progress. Each challenge question answered correctly was worth 250 points, added to the player's current score. At the end of each mini-game, the player was shown their accumulated points towards leveling up and was rewarded with game coins to purchase Extra Lives, Erasers, and Point Multipliers for Trivia, Sports, Words, and Tunes in addition to Super Spins which were only playable in Words. Once a season ended, all players' scores reset to Level 0 for the next season which started the following day, though game coins (and items purchased with them) remained.

=== HQ Sports ===
On May 31, 2018, HQ introduced HQ Sports, a spinoff game in which players answer sports trivia questions. HQ Sports was hosted by Lauren Gambino, co-host of the fantasy football web show "Offsides". HQ Sports was usually played every Monday and Wednesday at 8 pm ET and its standard jackpot was $1,000 each show. On May 7, 2020, Matt Richards announced that HQ Sports would return on May 10, hosted again by Gambino, scheduled for Sundays and Thursdays at 5 pm ET. After airing six games sponsored by Busch Light beer, Gambino announced another HQ Sports hiatus during the broadcast of May 28, 2020.

=== HQ Words ===
In December 2018, HQ launched another game called HQ Words, a word puzzle game in the style of Wheel of Fortune. Players first spin a wheel to receive a free letter which automatically appears for them if it is in a specific puzzle. Players are then given a series of 12 puzzles in which they fill in letters to complete the word or short sentence. Initially, if players entered 3 letters wrong in a single puzzle, they were eliminated from the game. Beginning on February 13, 2019, HQ Words began allowing 10 total incorrect letter choices across all the game's puzzles. By April 2019, it had changed to 5 strikes plus one for each level the player has attained in the current HQ Season. The prize ranged from $1,000 to $10,000. HQ Words was usually hosted by comedian Anna Roisman, but had been guest hosted by Matt Richards, Timothy Dunn, and Neil Patrick Harris. This game was played on Tuesdays and Thursdays at 9:30 ET.

On January 29, 2021, HQ announced on their HQ Trivia Twitter page that HQ Words would be returning to the app on Wednesdays at 9pm ET.

=== HQ Tunes ===
On October 9, 2019, HQ announced and launched a spinoff trivia game called "HQ Tunes" hosted by New York City singer and songwriter Melody Alanna, who was a host of the former music trivia app, "Out of Tune". Unlike the main Trivia format, players had 10 seconds to answer multimedia questions that played behind the answer choices. This game was played on Fridays at 9 pm ET.

=== HQ After Dark ===
Also in September 2019, HQ introduced an additional version of the game called HQ After Dark. This version played in the same format as Trivia, except this version was more adult-oriented, as the hosts were allowed to freely use swear words, interact more directly than in a regular game by responding to the chat, and appeared to drink on camera as it was played late at night. There was no set time when HQ After Dark was played, though it would most often occur after midnight Eastern Time. The game was hosted by two members of the hosting group, most often Matt Richards and Anna Roisman. HQ After Dark usually occurred on a weekly basis.

=== HQX ===
On December 12, 2019, HQ launched HQX, a multi-themed photo competition hosted by Matt Friend. Participants submitted and rated photos, and the most popular in each game was deemed the winner. This game was usually played on Sundays and Thursdays at 8 pm ET. HQX originated from the concept of HQ Date Night, which envisioned a live version of Tinder but never advanced beyond the conceptual stage. The game was first 'revealed' in a now-deleted tweet by co-founder Rus Yusupov approximately two months before it was hinted at during an evening HQ game under the working title 'Swipe.'

=== HQ Drops (beta) ===
HQ Drops was a live QVC-like show hosted by Lauren Gambino. During the show, HQ merchandise would be displayed and users would have between 60 and 180 seconds to purchase the current item either using Apple Pay or Google Pay. After the first and final Drops game, the feature would continue to be used on Trivia, Sports, and After Dark.

=== HQ Jokes (beta) ===
Beginning its beta stage in September 2019, HQ Jokes is a live comedy show where users rate standup comedians' jokes live. The show would usually have between 3–6 guests with around three sets each. During the voting round, users can choose to like, dislike, or tip the comedian 10 coins as much as they please. At the end of the show, the top three comedians with the most votes win the game.

== Controversies ==
=== Payments ===
HQ had been criticized for its method of paying winners. Some players or previous winners had a grey cashout button, which meant that either the player had not won anything or they were soft-banned from the game due to "bot checking". For iOS users, some winners had the cashout button gray. For Android users, the cashout button could be clicked, but it would display a message saying that the player needed $0.01 or more to cashout even though they had met the payout threshold. Typically, victorious players received under $1, although payouts on occasion got as high as $100,000 and a pair of HQ Nike sneakers. In order to cash out and receive their winnings through a PayPal deposit, winners previously needed to have achieved a "minimum prize balance" of $20 accumulated within a period of 90 days, or all prior winnings are forfeited, per the game's terms of service. Starting on January 26, 2018, during the 3 pm ET show, it was announced that there would be no minimum amount to cash out. On September 1, 2020, a cashout limit was reinstated, requiring players to accumulate $5 of approved winnings.

Alex Jacob, who won a $20,000 prize on HQ Trivia in June 2019, stated he had not been paid his winnings a month after his win. In lieu of a direct payment, HQ had initially informed Jacob that they would email further instructions but never sent the email and failed to respond to follow-ups. Jacob eventually received his payment in August and gave a public statement noting that the company had delayed in the payout to ensure that he had not defrauded the system.

=== Technical issues ===
The iOS and Android apps experienced many technical glitches as the app grew in popularity, sparking outrage from players. In addition, users complained of lagging, freezing, and premature elimination during gameplay, which on several occasions, including January 17, 2018, and May 8, 2018, became so severe the game was postponed to address the difficulties.

=== Co-founder's reputation ===
Creators Rus Yusupov and Colin Kroll sought to attract investors and venture capitalist firms to fund HQ with the intent of landing a post-money valuation as high as $100 million. However, Kroll's prior split from Twitter caused issues; Kroll departed the social media site in 2014 after accusations of incompetence and alleged inappropriate behavior towards women. On March 6, 2018, HQ's parent company, Intermedia Labs, successfully raised $15 million from the venture capital firm Founders Fund. On December 16, 2018, Kroll was found dead from an apparent drug overdose in his Manhattan apartment.

== Reception ==
The game won the A-Train Award for Best Mobile Game at the New York Game Awards 2018. It also won the award for "Word & Trivia Game" with Nike and HQ Trivia – Nike X HQ Air Max Day at the 2019 Webby Awards.

Time magazine ranked it "App of the year" for 2017.

On July 16, 2019, it was announced that HQ Trivia was nominated for a Primetime Emmy Award for Outstanding Interactive Program for its partnership with Warner Bros. to promote The Lego Movie 2: The Second Part.

Year	Award	Category	Nominee(s)	Result	Ref.
2019	Webby Award	Best Word & Trivia Game	Colin Kroll, Rus Yusupov, Brandon Teitel, Dylan Abruscato, Nick Gallo, Scott Rogowsky, Russell Wyner, Alexander Friedman, Josiah Madigan; with Nike and R/GA	Won	
2019	Clio Sports	Digital/Mobile: Games	Colin Kroll, Rus Yusupov, Brandon Teitel, Dylan Abruscato, Nick Gallo, Scott Rogowsky, Russell Wyner, Alexander Friedman, Josiah Madigan; with Nike and R/GA	Won	
2019	Clio Sports	Partnerships, Sponsorships & Collaborations	Colin Kroll, Rus Yusupov, Brandon Teitel, Dylan Abruscato, Nick Gallo, Scott Rogowsky, Russell Wyner, Alexander Friedman, Josiah Madigan; with Nike and R/GA	Won	
2019	Shorty Award	Emerging Platform	Rus Yusupov, Brandon Teitel, Dylan Abruscato, Nick Gallo, Scott Rogowsky, Russell Wyner, Josiah Madigan; with Warner Bros. Pictures	Finalist	
2019	Primetime Emmy Award	Outstanding Original Interactive Program	Brandon Teitel, Dylan Abruscato, Scott Rogowsky, Nick Gallo, Ellen Burke; with Warner Bros. Pictures and Animal Logic	Nominated	
