= Sharon Carpenter =

British journalist (born 1982)

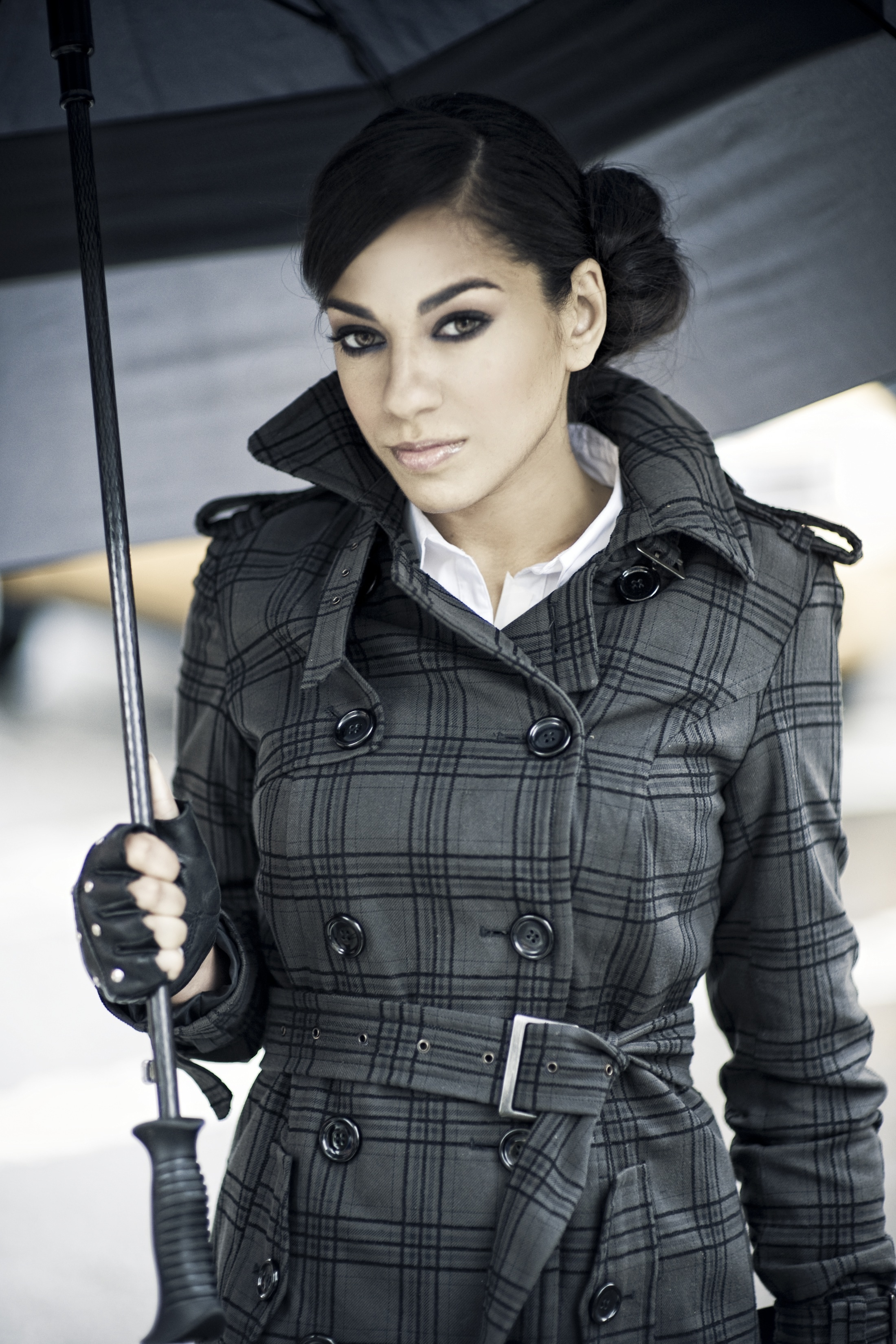
- Carpenter in 2009
- Born: Sharon Lee Carpenter; 2 March 1982 (age 44); England
- Education: Pace University (BBA) magna cum laude
- Occupations: Broadcast journalist; television host; producer; reality TV personality
- Years active: 2004–present
- Known for: Black Entertainment Television; BET International; BBC World News America; GlobalGrind; The Gossip Game; WPIX; HQ Trivia
- Website: www.sharonlcarpenter.com

Sharon Lee Carpenter (born 2 March 1982) is a British broadcast journalist, actress, television host, and producer. She has worked as an on-air personality for a number of top American television networks including CBS, BET, BBC America, REVOLT TV, and VH1. Currently, she is a guest correspondent for E! News and often contributes on CNN and GMA3. Carpenter recently won both a Telly Award and a Webby Awards honor for an Instagram Live series she created during the coronavirus pandemic - a celebrity interview show called "Let's Go Live!"

From 2019 - 2021, she was the host of "The Royal Report" - a weekly entertainment news web-series, by People Magazine and People TV, that covered the royal family. Sharon was also a host for the viral mobile trivia game HQ Trivia. She presented the UK version of the show twice daily weekdays and once on Saturdays and Sundays and regularly hosted the U.S. version of the show. Until it was cancelled in 2022, she could also be seen as a regular contributor on The Wendy Williams Show. Carpenter guest-starred in an episode of FOX's Empire where she played herself.

After building her career in the U.S., Carpenter reached what the Huffington Post described as "cult figure" status in the U.K. in the first few months of her presenting there. In 2018, she was named one of the most influential people in London by the Evening Standard on their Progress 1000 list.

Carpenter initially rose to fame as an anchor and reporter for Black Entertainment Television (BET) and BET International – the first British TV personality ever to represent the brand. Carpenter also received international attention for her news coverage as a correspondent for the BBC program BBC World News America.

In 2013, she co-created her first television show, VH1's The Gossip Game, and appeared on the series as a main cast member. The docu-soap followed the lives and careers of seven female media personalities reporting on the entertainment industry.

Carpenter has won four awards from the New York Association of Black Journalists (NYABJ) two Telly Awards and a Webby Awards honor. She currently lives in Los Angeles and serves as an ambassador for Oxfam America.

== Early life and education ==
Carpenter was born in England, the daughter and step-daughter of two medical doctors and former professors at Harvard Medical School, Grace and Phillip McKee. Her father, Chris Carpenter, died in 2012.

She is of Indian and European descent. In 2000, she moved to New York City to attend Pace University. She graduated magna cum laude with a Bachelor of Business Administration (BBA) in business management.

Carpenter has two siblings; including best-selling author, Kathryn Croft and DJ / producer Jazz T.

== Career ==
Carpenter began her career in broadcast news as an associate producer for WWOR-TV (my9 News) in New York City before moving on to work as a producer at BET News. Sharon briefly left BET for her first on-air position as a reporter for MarketWatch.

She returned to BET in 2006 as an on-air correspondent and anchor where she hosted the network's daily news briefs, news specials and reported on breaking news on 106 & Park, the channel's highest-rated show. Her most notable accomplishments during this time include her coverage of the 2008 presidential election, providing political commentary and analysis on election night from the headquarters of Senator John McCain. Carpenter also played an integral role in BET's coverage of the death of Michael Jackson in 2009. She reported on the event live from Los Angeles and anchored the network's special reports, including the award-winning documentary Forever the King: A Tribute to Michael Jackson. Sharon spearheaded the launch of BET in the United Kingdom and produced its first news special, Beauty Blackout, about discriminatory standards of beauty.

Carpenter left BET again in 2010 and joined BBC News as a contributing correspondent for BBC World News America. There, she became the first journalist to interview Wyclef Jean for television when he announced his plans to run for president of Haiti in 2010, a story that garnered international attention. She also worked as an entertainment reporter for the PIX 11 Morning News on New York's Tribute station WPIX.

In 2012, Sharon joined GlobalGrind, a pop culture website owned by hip-hop media mogul Russell Simmons. The website focuses on news, fashion, music, and politics from a young perspective. Carpenter was hired to enhance and expand the site's video content. Her stories have received up to 3000 hits per minute.

Sharon Carpenter became an on-air personality for Diddy's multi-genre, multi-platform music network, REVOLT TV in 2013 where she participated in the launch of the cable channel, hosting live news and entertainment programming. She has also done some guest correspondent work for the pop culture news magazine shows, Entertainment Tonight and The Insider.

Carpenter made regular appearances on the syndicated daytime talk series The Wendy Williams Show for a number of years. She also frequently hosted the trivia app HQ Trivia and was the main host for the UK version of the quiz show. Carpenter has also worked as an entertainment host for BBC America.

She often appears in news and entertainment news documentaries, across various networks, as a pop culture expert.

== Acting career ==
Carpenter had a brief speaking role in the 2025 release of "Superman" from director, James Gunn. She also had a co-starring role on episode 2, season 2 of FOX's prime-time hit show Empire ("Without A Country") which aired on 30 September 2015. She played herself and the host of the fictional talk show Spilling The Tea with Sharon Carpenter. In her televised acting debut, Carpenter sat down with Jamal Lyon for a one-on-one interview on his personal and professional life. During their discussion, Jamal speaks publicly on his relationship with his boyfriend, Michael, for the first time. Later in the scene Cookie Lyon bursts in and interrupts the interview. Carpenter became a trending topic on Twitter during the airing of the episode.

She was also featured in the pilot for a VH1 and BET project called "Wifey." In addition, she was cast in a cameo role in the BBC One comedy "Bumps."

== The Gossip Game ==
Sharon Carpenter is the co-creator of and was a main cast member on the VH1 reality TV show, The Gossip Game. The show followed the careers and personal lives of seven female media professionals working in the urban entertainment industry as radio personalities, journalists, and bloggers. The seven cast members are Vivian Billings, Sharon Carpenter, K. Foxx, JasFly, Kimberly Osorio, Candice Williams, and Angela Yee. The docu-series focused on the competitive nature of the entertainment industry, as well as the particular difficulties female media professionals face when working in a male-dominated field.

Carpenter developed the concept for the show with television producer Tone Boots. The show was produced by VH1 in conjunction with Magilla Entertainment, Mona Scott-Young, and District Media.
