= Jas Waters =

American television writer (1980–2020)

- Born: October 21, 1980; Evanston, Illinois, U.S.
- Died: June 9, 2020 (aged 39); Los Angeles, California, U.S.
- Education: Evanston Township High School; Columbia College Chicago
- Occupations: Screenwriter; journalist

Jas Waters (October 21, 1980 – June 9, 2020), also known as Jas Fly, was an American screenwriter and journalist. She was a staff writer for the television series This Is Us and also wrote for The Breaks, Hood Adjacent with James Davis, and Kidding. Waters was a journalist in the hip hop industry, writing a digital column for Vibe Vixen in the early 2010s and starring in the reality show The Gossip Game. She advocated for the importance of black writers in the film and television industry. Waters was born in Evanston, Illinois, and raised by her grandmother in a senior home. After graduating from Evanston Township High School, she attended Columbia College Chicago. She died of suicide by hanging on June 9, 2020, in Los Angeles County, California.
