= Night Sky (app) =

British stargazing reference app

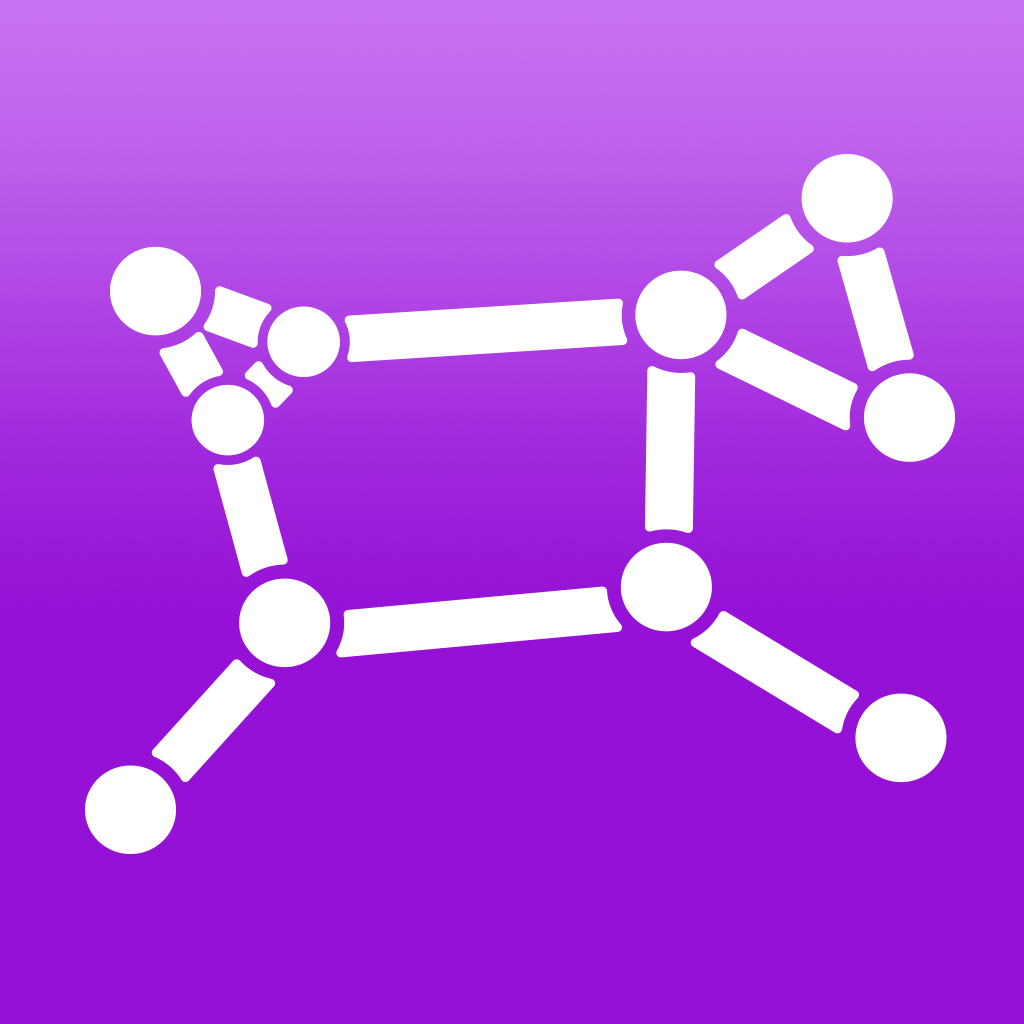
- Developer: iCandi Apps Ltd.
- Initial release: iOS: WW: November 1, 2011
- Platform: iOS, iPadOS, visionOS, macOS, tvOS, watchOS, iMessage
- Type: Reference
- Website: https://icandiapps.com

Night Sky (app) is an application developed and published by indie studio iCandi Apps Ltd. from the UK.

Night Sky is a stargazing reference app, where the user can explore a virtual representation of the night sky to identify stars, planets, constellations and satellites. The app is developed specifically for iOS, tvOS and watchOS devices. Night Sky was first released on November 1, 2011 for iOS, and has had multiple updates since launch. Night Sky was mentioned in the September 2016 Apple Keynote during the Apple Watch Series 2 announcement. In October 2016, Night Sky was featured as the Free App of The Week on the Apple App Store.

== Reception ==
Night Sky was featured in Apple's 'Best of 2012' and has also been pre-installed onto iPads in Apple retail stores worldwide.
