= Vine (service) =

Defunct American social network for short videos

- Screenshot A screenshot of a Vine on Shawn Mendes's profile showing the loops counter and description
- Original authors: Dom Hofmann; Rus Yusupov; Colin Kroll
- Developers: Vine Labs, Inc. (Twitter, Inc.)
- Release: January 24, 2013; 13 years ago – January 17, 2017; 9 years ago
- Operating system: Windows, macOS, Android, iOS, Windows Phone, Xbox One
- Successor: Huddles; Divine
- Available in: 27 languages
- Type: Video sharing
- License: Proprietary software
- Website: vine.co

Vine was a short-form video hosting service where users could share up to 6-second-long looping video clips. Founded in June 2012 by Rus Yusupov, Dom Hofmann and Colin Kroll, the company was bought by Twitter, Inc. (now X), four months later for $30 million. Vine launched with its iOS app on January 24, 2013, with Android and Windows versions following shortly after.

Videos published on Vine's social network could also be shared on different social networking platforms such as Facebook and Twitter. Vine app was also used to browse videos, along with a group of videos that were uploaded by theme, and hence sparked a hope that users could make "trend" videos. Vine then competed with other social media services such as Instagram and Snapchat. By December 2015, Vine had over 200 million active users.

Vine contributed to the rise of influencers and collaborative content creation, with some users cohabiting to increase production and audience reach. As one of the first short-form video platforms, it was relatively new, and it preceded later services such as TikTok, where similar content strategies became more widespread.

On October 27, 2016, Twitter announced that it would disable all uploads, but that viewing and download would continue to be active. Twitter officially shut down Vine on January 17, 2017, and the app's overall leftover function was discontinued a few months later. On January 20, 2017, Twitter launched an online archive of every Vine video that had ever been published. The archive was officially discontinued in April 2018. Vine's co-founder Dom Hofmann created a successor not affiliated with Twitter, which launched on January 24, 2020, as Byte; was renamed twice; and officially discontinued on May 3, 2023.

On November 13, 2025, former Twitter CEO Jack Dorsey announced a successor called Divine, which includes archives of some videos uploaded to Vine, in addition to new videos.

== History ==
Vine was founded by Dom Hofmann, Rus Yusupov, and Colin Kroll in June 2012. The company was acquired by Twitter in October 2012 for a reported $30 million. It launched its iOS app on January 24, 2013, with an Android version following on June 2, 2013. On November 12, 2013, the application was released for Windows Phone. In a couple of months, Vine became the most used video sharing application in the market, even with low adoption of the app. On April 9, 2013, Vine became the most downloaded free app within the iOS App Store and on May 1, 2014, Vine launched the web version of the service to explore videos.

In July 2014, Vine updated its app with a new "loop count", meaning every time someone watched a vine, a number on top of the video would appear showing how many times it was viewed. The "loop count" also included views from vines that were embedded onto other websites. On October 14, 2014, an Xbox One version was released allowing Xbox Live members to watch the looping videos.

On October 27, 2016, Vine announced that Twitter would be discontinuing the Vine mobile app. Vine said users of the service would be notified before any changes to the app or website were made. The company also stated that the website and the app would still be available for users to view and download Vines, but users would no longer be able to post.

The discontinuation of Vine came as many different competing platforms began to introduce their own equivalents to Vine's short-form video approach. Platforms such as Instagram began to introduce their own takes on the short video angle, such as Instagram Video where users were able to upload 15-second videos to their profiles.

Marketers leaving the platform was also a large part of the decision by Twitter to discontinue Vine. Many monetary sources began to move to longer short video platforms, and with them followed many popular Vine creators. Between January and June of 2016, more than half of Vine users with more than 15,000 followers ceased uploading or deleted their accounts to move on to other platforms such as YouTube, Instagram and Snapchat.

On December 16, 2016, it was announced that the Vine mobile app would remain operational as a standalone service, allowing users to publish their videos directly to Twitter instead of Vine; the Vine community website would shut down in January. On January 17, 2017, the app was renamed to "Vine Camera". Although the app still enabled users to record six-second videos, they could only be shared on Twitter or saved on a camera roll. The release of the Vine Camera was met with poor reviews on both the Android and iOS App Stores. On January 20, 2017, Twitter launched an Internet archive of all Vine videos, allowing people to continue watching previously filmed Vine videos; however, in 2018 this was also removed by Twitter.

The Verge reported that the closure of Vine led many of its most notable users, such as Kurtis Conner, David Dobrik, Danny Gonzalez, Drew Gooden, Liza Koshy, Shawn Mendes, Jake Paul, Logan Paul, and Lele Pons, to move to YouTube.

In November 2018, co-founder Dom Hoffman announced the upcoming successor to Vine, Byte, also previously known as V2; it was slated to come out in spring 2019. The Byte application launched publicly a year later on January 24, 2020. In 2021, Vine has announced that they will discontinue their app.

After Elon Musk completed his purchase of social media company Twitter, he posted a poll on Twitter on October 30, 2022, whether to "Bring back Vine?". It has received over 4.9 million votes, with the majority (69.6%) being in favor. An Axios article published on October 31, 2022, stated that Musk purportedly requested Twitter engineers work on rebooting Vine. On April 17, 2024, Musk posted the same poll on X (formerly Twitter) which accumulated nearly 2.3 million votes, with 69.6% being in favor.

== Features ==
Vine enabled users to record short video clips up to six seconds long while recording through its in-app camera. The camera would record only while the screen was being touched, enabling users to edit on the fly or create stop motion effects. Additional features were added to the app in July 2013; these included grid and ghost image tools for the camera, curated channels (including themed areas and trending topics/users), the ability to "revine" (share again, similar to Twitter's "retweet") videos on a personal stream, and protected posts.

In August 2015, Vine introduced Vine Music, whose "Snap to Beat" feature creates perfect infinite music loops. In June 2016, Vine announced that it was experimenting with letting users attach video clips up to 140 seconds.

=== Vine Kids ===
In January 2015, Vine launched Vine Kids, an app for iOS that was designed specifically for children aged 7 to 12. It was designed by a group of Vine employees in order to try to create a safer space for younger users to eventually watch content which was deemed appropriate for children. Every video posted to the app was selected by Vine employees to ensure safety.

Vine's Head of Communication and Marketing, Carolyn Penner, noting the features of the app, told CNN that "children can always swipe back and forth on the mobile screen to find new videos, and they can also tap on the screen to produce some sound effects".

== Usage ==
Vine attracted different types of uses, including short-form comedy and music performances, video editing, and stop motion animation. On February 1, 2013, a Turkish journalist used Vine to document the aftermath of the 2013 United States embassy bombing in Ankara. Vine had also gained ground as a promotional tool; in 2013, the track listing of Daft Punk's album Random Access Memories was revealed via a Vine video, and on September 9, 2013, Dunkin' Donuts became the first company to use a single Vine as an entire television advertisement. A&W Restaurants launched its Mini Polar Swirls on Vine on April 1, 2014, with the claim that it was the first product launch on Vine.

Music-oriented videos also shared success on the service; in July 2013, a Vine post featuring a group of women twerking to the 2012 song "Don't Drop That Thun Thun" became popular, spawned response videos, and led the previously obscure song to peak at number 35 on the Billboard Hot 100 chart. In March 2013, 22 Vines were presented in an exhibit entitled #SVAES (The Shortest Video Art Ever Sold) at the Moving Image art fair in New York City. Copies of the videos were available to purchase on thumb drives for US$200 each. Angela Washko's "Tits on Tits on Ikea" was sold to Dutch art advisor, curator and collector Myriam Vanneschi during the event, marking the first-ever sale of a Vine as art.

Following the shooting of Michael Brown in August 2014, then-St Louis City Alderman Antonio French used Vine as a way to document the protests in Ferguson and the surrounding area. These videos were among the earliest accounts of the racial tensions in Ferguson, and helped bring national attention to the situation.

=== Internet memes ===
Vine has spawned countless internet memes across its years of active service. Notable examples include:

"Eyebrows on Fleek" is a vine posted on June 21, 2014, by Kayla Lewis, better known as her online personality "PEACHES MONROEE", following her complimenting her eyebrows, and saying how her eyebrows, the now iconic phrase, were "on fleek" ("on fleek" basically meaning "attractive"). The vine quickly grew in popularity around the internet, even making an appearance inside an Ariana Grande video and many beauty articles, of them repeatedly using the phrase. Following these events, Lewis wanted to trademark the phrase, stating how everyone uses the phrase, yet she doesn't get any recognition, so she started a GoFundMe page, with the profits going towards her own cosmetics line. Since then, her GoFundMe campaign continues to grow to her goal of $100,000.

"Squidward Dab" is a vine posted on January 26, 2016, taking place in what appears to be a SpongeBob-themed parade inside an amusement park, when a float drives along with a person wearing a Squidward costume standing atop it. A man in the crowd yells out to Squidward asking him to do the "dab", a popular dance craze at the time, to which Squidward replies and dabs. It became a very popular meme.

"What are those?" is a vine posted in 2015 by A-RODney King, which was taken from an Instagram post by Brandon Moore, better known as "Young Busco", following him making fun of a police officer's shoes shouting out "What are those!?," while panning the camera towards the shoes. The vine quickly grew in popularity, receiving nearly 40 million loops and users among vine imitating the trend. The phrase made its way into the film Black Panther when a character from the film, Shuri, sees her brother, T'Challa and shouts out the phrase after seeing his sandals. When Moore saw that scene when he brought his family to watch the movie, he said it left him "sick as fuck". His daughter wanted to record the moment on her phone, but it was slapped out of her hand by Moore. He went on to say "didn't want to be fucking part of this," he stated to HuffPost, "Every time I see that shit, I get depressed." Moore died in November 2018 at the age of 31 from combined drug intoxication, with "cocaine, morphine, codeine, methamphetamines and ecstasy" found in his blood.

"Okay Guy" is a vine posted on December 29, 2014, by Lilianna Hogan, known as her online personality Lil e, following her and Bizagwira "Jackson" Marc when Hogan greets Marc with "hi!" to which he replies "okay". Unexpectedly, the post went viral, currently gathering over 60 million loops. Many other users on Vine took on with the trend, making their own version of it; even Justin Bieber posted a version of it. A tribute was made to the video and created the hashtag "#okaymovement" containing many mash-ups, some linked to the song Mercy by Kanye West. The video was created when Hogan tried to record her mother as she got angry at her phone, but Marc got into frame. When she posted the vine, she said she "felt a bit awkward" as the video grew in popularity as she thought people were laughing at the fact that Marc was black because "that's what people do on Vine". Marc is a porter for Volcanoes National Park the hills of north-west Rwanda, where the video is set in. He said that he is "very proud and happy" of the popularity of the video, though he said it was also "strange" to see the video.

"9+10" is a vine posted in June 2013 by DREHUPEMSU, following him telling his brother that he is stupid. He replies, "no I'm not," so DREHUPEMSU continues with the question, "what's nine plus ten?". His brother replies with "twenty-one", and is again called stupid. The vine went viral, currently gaining over 700,000 likes and over 30 million loops. On September 10, 2021, a post was made on Instagram by a gimmick account named "TwentyOneCount" saying how today is 9/10/21, which contains the same digits as 9+10=21. People started joking about how the day could be something that could impact the world greatly, such as how the day could be Judgement day, or how a natural disaster or a terrorist attack could occur. After the post, the account gained over 118,000 followers and some of the posts reaching over 150,000 likes.

== Reception ==
A BBC review described collections of Vine videos as "mesmerizing", like "[watching a] bewildering carousel of six-second slices of ordinary life [roll] past."

An article by The New Yorker investigated the impact of online video platforms in creating a new generation of celebrities, stating: "A Vine's blink-quick transience, combined with its endless looping, simultaneously squeezes time and stretches it." While a given loop's brevity seems to "squeeze time", repeated viewings allow users to absorb rich detail, thereby subjectively "stretching time".

Many brands used the service as a free platform for advertising their products, showing off exclusive content and creating contests to keep consumers interested in the brand. Cadbury UK had used their profile to show off new confectioneries that were in the making and created a contest around giving out samples to keep people coming back to the chocolate company. Many local and chain bookstores used the site to show off new books. Other companies developed a more personal connection with consumers using their six-second videos. This also allowed fans of different brands to show off their loyalty to the brand and in turn advertised the brand from a different perspective, this included makeup videos and the like.

Soon after its launch, Vine faced criticism for how it handled pornography; while porn is not forbidden by Twitter's guidelines, one sexually explicit clip was accidentally featured as an "Editor's Pick" in the Vine app as a result of "human error". Because pornography violates Apple's terms of service, the app's rating was changed to 17+ in February 2013 following a request by Apple. Vine was listed among Time's '50 Best Android Apps for 2013'.

== Competitors ==
Instagram added 15-second video sharing in June 2013. Since then, the video functionality expanded with additional features: widescreen videos, 60-second videos, and up to 10 minutes of video in a multi-video post. As with Vine, Instagram videos loop and have no playback controls by default. Snapchat added 10-second video sharing in December 2012.

YouTube launched a GIF creator in 2014. This tool allows up to six seconds of any supported YouTube video to be converted to a GIF. Sign-ups for the GIF beta are now discontinued. YouTube later began catering to those who create primarily shorter videos with its YouTube Shorts platform.

TikTok (called Douyin in China) was created a few months before the discontinuation of Vine. Its current edition is the result of the merger of the original TikTok app with Musical.ly, which was founded in 2014 and became popular in 2015. TikTok is similar to Vine in that it is a simple short video platform with the added option of Duet, meaning that two different TikTok creators may collaborate at different times to create a final video; The Verge called it "the closest thing we'll get to having Vine back". TikTok is not much younger than Vine, as its predecessor Musical.ly was introduced only a year after Vine's inception, but it increased in popularity in the late 2010s after Vine was shut down.

== Successors ==
=== Huddles ===
Huddles (originally named "Byte", later Clash) was a successor to Vine created by a team led by Vine co-founder Dom Hofmann. Videos could have lasted between two and six-and-a-half seconds and looped continuously. The launch had originally been planned for mid-2018. Reports from early 2018 showed that Hofmann had already started reaching out to social media personalities in hopes to secure viral content for the new platform. On May 4, 2018, Hofmann announced on the V2 community forums website and the official Twitter account that the project had been postponed indefinitely. On November 8, 2018, Hofmann announced the official name for 'V2' would be 'Byte', and that it was set for release in the spring of 2019. Byte underwent a closed beta period with community members from a Byte dedicated forum who were invited to test the app. Byte was officially launched on the iOS and Android stores on January 24, 2020. On January 26, 2021, Hofmann announced in the Byte forum that the app would be run by a company named Clash. Months later Byte was re-launched and renamed to Clash, which was eventually renamed again to Huddles. On May 3, 2023, Huddles announced its discontinuation as a standalone service via a series of tweets and a Medium blog post. The company began to remove the Huddles app from the Apple's App Store and Google Play Store in a phased manner, with the process commencing immediately upon announcement.

=== Divine ===
On November 14, 2025, Jack Dorsey announced the beta release of Divine, built by Evan Henshaw-Plath. The app uses the same 6-second looping video format as Vine, and will restore 150,000 to 200,000 Vines from 60,000 creators acquired from Archive Team, a digital preservation group which saved the Vines before the app's shutdown in 2016. The app runs on the Nostr protocol. The team behind the app will also follow DMCA takedown requests from former Vine accounts, or provide their previous account with the videos to the end user. The app also uses Proofmode, an AI detection technology from the Guardian Project, which will attempt to filter and remove videos with AI content.

As of April 29, 2026, Divine is available on Google Play and the App Store. It has been reported to host more than two million original Vine videos.

== See also ==
- Internet meme
- Likee (formerly LIKE)
- Snapchat
- TikTok

=== Other defunct social networks ===
- BlackBerry Messenger
- Friendster
- Mig33
- Path
- Skype
