= Rus Yusupov =

American designer and tech entrepreneur

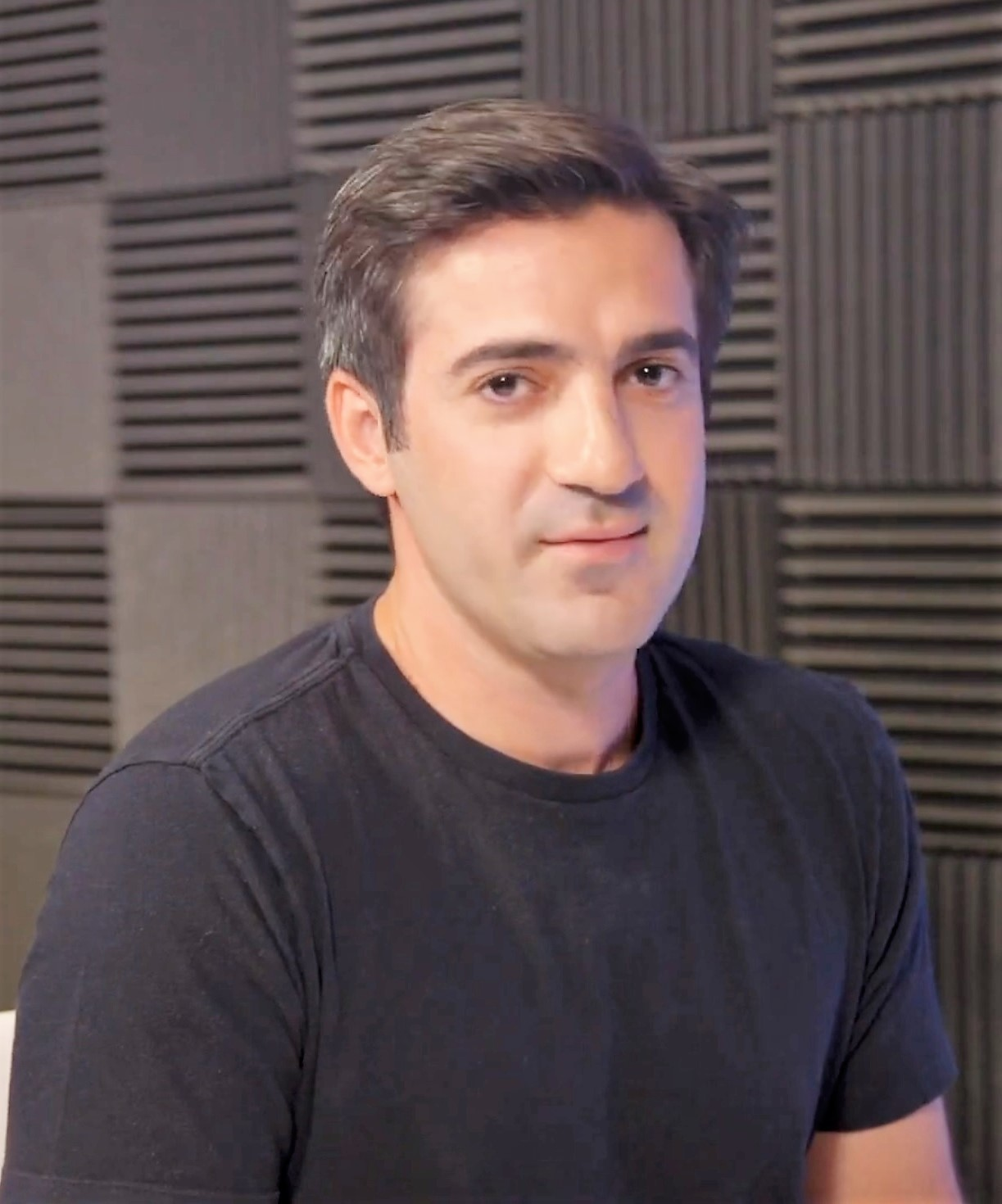
- Yusupov on "I'm with the Brand", Adweek, in 2019
- Born: Ruslan Yusupov; May 4, 1984 (age 42); Dushanbe, Tajik SSR, Soviet Union
- Education: School of Visual Arts; Fiorello H. LaGuardia High School
- Alma mater: School of Visual Arts
- Occupations: Internet entrepreneur, Product designer
- Years active: 2007–present
- Known for: Founding HQ Trivia, Intermedia Labs, Vine and Big Human
- Title: Co-founder and CEO at HQ Trivia, and founder at Big Human
- Awards: Tribeca Disruptive Innovation Award (2013), Variety Magazine Breakthrough of the Year (2014), PGA Digital VIP Award (2014), UJA Lydia Vareljan Leadership Award (2015), Webby Award's Webby 50 (2015)

Rus Yusupov (born May 4, 1984) is an American designer and tech entrepreneur. He is best known as the co-founder of Vine and the co-founder and CEO of HQ Trivia.

== Early life and education ==
Yusupov was born in Dushanbe, Tajik SSR, Soviet Union (present-day Dushanbe, Tajikistan), in 1984 to a Bukharan Jewish family. After the Revolutions of 1989 the family moved to New York, where Yusupov grew up and graduated from LaGuardia High School of Music and Art and the School of Visual Arts (SVA) with a BFA in Graphic Design.

=== Early career ===
Yusupov began his career as a digital product designer at firms including Razorfish and R/GA, where he worked on projects including as the lead designer on the first version of Hulu.com in 2007.

=== Vine ===
In June 2012, Yusupov co-founded Vine, a looping, short-form video service. Vine was sold to Twitter in October 2012 for a reported $30 million, shortly before the service's official launch. In 2013, Vine hit number one on the App Store for free downloads and became the most used video sharing application on the market at the time. Yusupov left Twitter in late 2015 after Vine was deprioritized by Twitter. Yusupov later tweeted, "Don't sell your company!"

=== Intermedia Labs ===
After leaving Twitter, Yusupov co-founded Intermedia Labs, an app studio, in 2015.

The first app developed by Intermedia Labs was Hype, a platform wherein users had the ability to share a variety of multimedia content into a live broadcast.

Subsequent apps developed by Intermedia Labs include Bounce, an app that allows users to "remix" videos, and HQ Trivia, an appointment-based trivia game that is broadcast live to mobile phones.

=== HQ Trivia ===
HQ Trivia, Intermedia's most successful app to-date, was released in August 2017. The game averaged 700,000–1,000,000 viewers for each broadcast. HQ was available worldwide on the iOS App Store and Google Play, with live shows targeted to North American, Australian, and UK audiences.

The app took the form of a live game show, played at 9 PM Eastern Time every day, and occasionally at various other times for special themed programs (focused on specific topics such as sports, music, or word-puzzles). The host of the show asked a series of (usually) twelve multiple choice questions, each with three possible answers. Those players who answered the questions correctly within the 10-second limit moved on, and the rest were eliminated. The players that correctly answered the final question split the prize money. This prize was most recently $5,000 for most games, but it had been as high as $400,000 on one occasion.

According to a 2017 Daily Beast article, Yusupov threatened to fire HQ host Scott Rogowsky if the website chose to run a profile on Rogowsky's rise to fame via HQ. Yusupov later claimed the accusations were false. HQ shut down on February 14, 2020, after its primary investors had stopped funding the company and a potential sale of HQ to an "established business" fell through. Six weeks later, on March 29, 2020, Yusupov tweeted that HQ Trivia was returning that evening.

== Industry awards and recognition ==
Yusupov has received industry recognitions including a Tribeca Disruptive Innovation Award (2013), Variety Magazine Breakthrough of the Year Award (2014), PGA Digital VIP Award (2014), UJA Lydia Vareljan Leadership Award (2015) and the Webby Award's Webby 50 (2015).

HQ Trivia won the A-Train Award for Best Mobile Game at the New York Game Awards 2018. It was also nominated for a Primetime Emmy Award for Outstanding Interactive Program in 2019.

Intermedia Labs was one of Fast Company's World's Most Innovative Companies in 2018. HQ Trivia became a finalist in the Apps and Games category for Fast Company's 2018 Innovation By Design Award.
