= Scott Rogowsky =

American television host (born 1984)

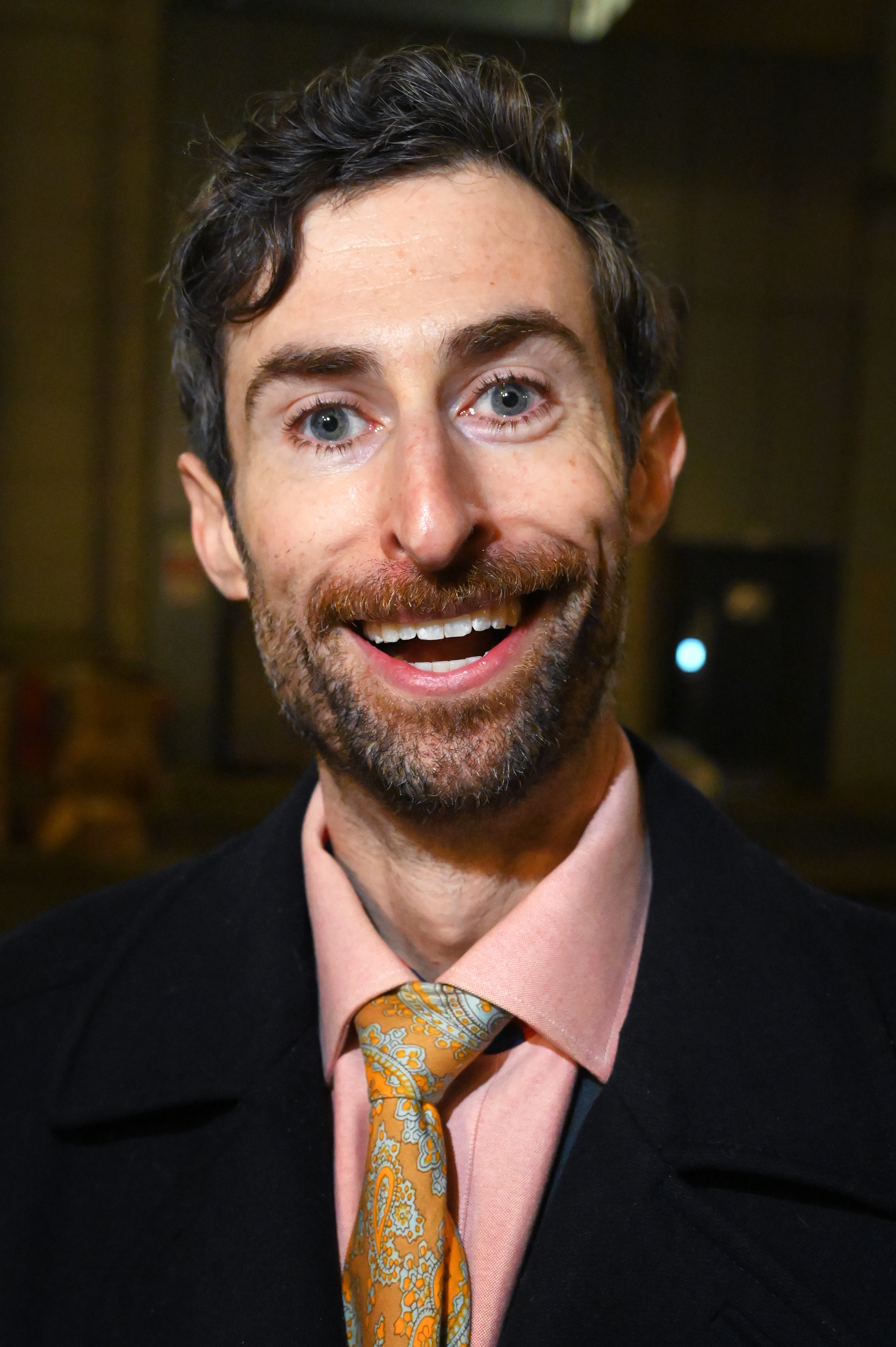
- Rogowsky in 2026
- Born: December 4, 1984 (age 41); Manhattan, New York, U.S.
- Education: Johns Hopkins University
- Occupations: Comedian; game show host
- Known for: HQ Trivia; Running Late with Scott Rogowsky
- Employer: DAZN

Comedy career
- Medium: Stand-up
- Website: www.scottrogowsky.com

Scott Rogowsky (born December 4, 1984) is an American comedian and television personality. He is best known for his time hosting HQ Trivia, a mobile game show.

== Early life ==
Rogowsky was born in Manhattan and raised in Harrison, New York. He graduated from Johns Hopkins University in 2007 with a degree in political science.

== Career ==
=== Beginnings ===
Since 2011, Rogowsky has hosted Running Late with Scott Rogowsky, a live talk show held at various venues around New York City (such as the Gramercy Theater) and Los Angeles. Guests have included comedians, musicians, authors, and actors.

Rogowsky gained notoriety as the creator of several viral videos, including 10 Hours of Walking in NYC as a Jew, and Taking Fake Book Covers on the Subway. In 2017, he hosted a "pop-up" talk show, Start T@lkin, which streamed on Go90 for one season.

=== HQ Trivia ===
In August 2017, Rogowsky began as the primary host of HQ Trivia, an app and trivia game. Following its launch, Rogowsky gained a significant cult following among the game's players. Rogowsky's catchphrase, "let's get down to the nitty-gritty," was spoken at least once each episode of HQ Trivia, and is a quote from the song "AC/DC Bag" by Phish. In 2019, Rogowsky joined DAZN and began hosting a sports program. A month later, it was confirmed that Scott had stopped hosting HQ Trivia.

=== Later broadcasting career ===
In March 2019, Rogowsky began co-hosting ChangeUp, a baseball program broadcast on the subscription video streaming network DAZN. A month later, it was confirmed that he had stopped hosting HQ Trivia due to an inability to organize a scheduling agreement around the two shows. ChangeUp was cancelled in July 2020.

During the COVID-19 pandemic, Rogowsky hosted a livestreamed comedy show called "IsoLateNight" in which he interviewed other comedians in isolation. He sold some of his collection of vintage shirts to raise money for charities. Rogowsky was selected to host a web-based trivia game for the antacid brand TUMS during the broadcast of Super Bowl LVI. The show took place via the brand's Twitter account as the game was in progress.

=== Vintage clothing sales ===
Rogowsky started collecting and selling vintage clothing in 2003. He started an Instagram account called Quiz Daddy's Closet in 2019 and sold some items to raise money for charity. In January 2022, he opened a physical storefront, also called "Quiz Daddy’s Closet", in Santa Monica, California. After Jeopardy! host Alex Trebek died of pancreatic cancer, Rogowsky bought many of Trebek's garments, which he auctioned to raise funds for the Lustgarten Foundation for Pancreatic Cancer Research.

=== Savvy ===
In January 2026, Rogowsky started hosting the flagship show of TextSavvy, Savvy, an app and live version Wordle.

== Personal life ==
Rogowsky is a Phish fan. He is Jewish. He is a brother of the Alpha Epsilon Pi fraternity. Rogowsky also enjoys baseball and is a fan of the New York Mets. His favorite player is Tim Teufel.
